= 2009 Australian Open – Wheelchair women's singles =

Wheelchair women's singles
- 2009 Australian Open

Final
- Champion: (Netherlands) Esther Vergeer
- Runner-up: (Netherlands) Korie Homan
- Score: 6–4, 6–2

Events
Singles	men	women		boys	girls
Doubles	men	women	mixed	boys	girls
WC Singles	men	women	quad
WC Doubles	men	women	quad
Legends	men	women	mixed
← 2008 ·	Australian Open	· 2010 →

Three-time defending champion Esther Vergeer defeated Korie Homan in a rematch of the previous year's final, 6–4, 6–2 to win the women's singles wheelchair tennis title at the 2009 Australian Open.

== Seeds ==
1. (Netherlands) Esther Vergeer (champion)
2. (Netherlands) Korie Homan (final)

== Draw ==
=== Key ===
- Q = Qualifier
- WC = Wild card
- LL = Lucky loser
- Alt = Alternate
- ITF = ITF entry
- PR = Protected ranking
- SR = Special ranking
- SE = Special exempt
- JE = Junior exempt
- JR = Junior Accelerator Programme entrant
- CO = College Accelerator Programme entrant
- NG = Next Gen Accelerator Program entrant
- w/o = Walkover
- r = Retired
- d = Defaulted

=== Finals ===
First round
1	(Netherlands) Esther Vergeer	6	6
(United Kingdom) Lucy Shuker	1	2
(Australia) Daniela Di Toro	6	7
(Netherlands) Jiske Griffioen	3	6^{7}
(Poland) Agnieszka Bartczak	3	3
(France) Florence Gravellier	6	6
(Germany) Katharina Krüger	0	2
2	(Netherlands) Korie Homan	6	6

Semifinals
1	(Netherlands) Esther Vergeer	6	6
(Australia) Daniela Di Toro	1	3
(France) Florence Gravellier	5	1
2	(Netherlands) Korie Homan	7	6

Final
1	(Netherlands) Esther Vergeer	6	6
2	(Netherlands) Korie Homan	4	2
