= David Wagner (tennis) =

American wheelchair tennis player

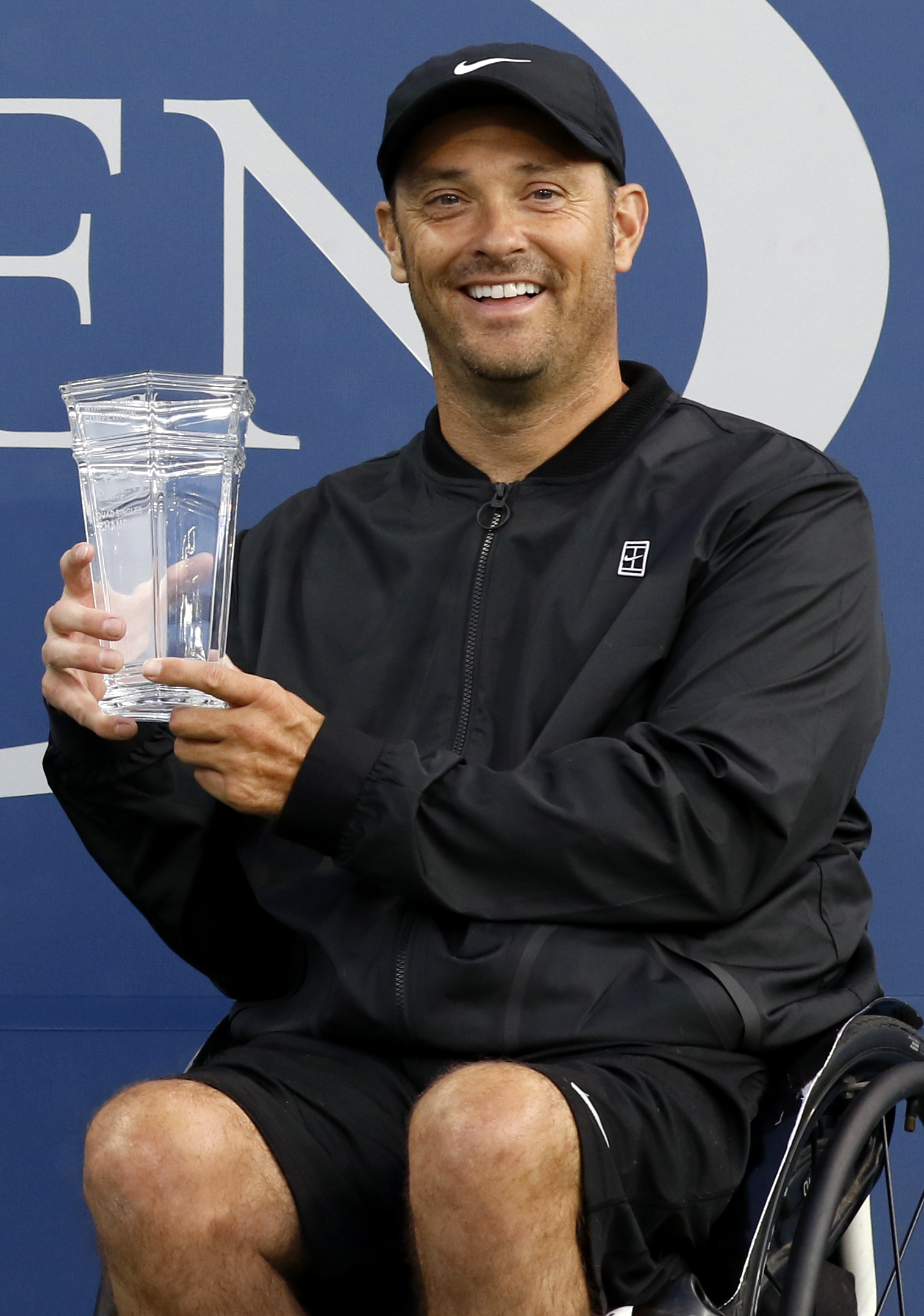
- Wagner at the 2017 US Open
- Country (sports): United States
- Residence: Chula Vista, California, U.S.
- Born: March 4, 1974 (age 52) Fullerton, California, U.S.
- Plays: Right Handed

Singles
- Career record: 892–198
- Career titles: 166
- Highest ranking: No. 1 (April 7, 2003)
- Current ranking: No. 3 (July 11, 2022)

Grand Slam singles results
- Australian Open: W (2011, 2013, 2014)
- French Open: F (2019)
- Wimbledon: SF (2019, 2021, 2022)
- US Open: W (2010, 2011, 2017)

Other tournaments
- Masters: W (2004, 2005, 2007, 2008, 2012, 2013, 2014, 2015, 2016, 2017, 2019)
- Paralympic Games: F (2004, 2012)

Doubles
- Career record: 570–122
- Career titles: 187
- Highest ranking: No. 1 (October 14, 2002)
- Current ranking: No. 3 (July 11, 2022)

Grand Slam doubles results
- Australian Open: W (2008, 2009, 2010, 2013, 2014, 2015, 2016, 2017, 2022, 2024)
- French Open: W (2019, 2020, 2021)
- Wimbledon: W (2021)
- US Open: W (2007, 2009, 2010, 2011, 2013, 2014, 2015, 2017, 2018)

Other doubles tournaments
- Masters Doubles: W (2005, 2006, 2007, 2009, 2011, 2012, 2013, 2014, 2015, 2017, 2018)
- Paralympic Games: W (2004, 2008, 2012)
Medal record
Men's wheelchair tennis
Representing the United States
Paralympic Games
Gold medal – first place	2004 Athens	Quad doubles
Gold medal – first place	2008 Beijing	Quad doubles
Gold medal – first place	2012 London	Quad doubles
Silver medal – second place	2004 Athens	Quad singles
Silver medal – second place	2012 London	Quad singles
Silver medal – second place	2016 Rio de Janeiro	Quad doubles
Bronze medal – third place	2008 Beijing	Quad singles
Bronze medal – third place	2016 Rio de Janeiro	Quad singles
Parapan American Games
Silver medal – second place	2019 Lima	Quad singles
Bronze medal – third place	2023 Santiago	Quad doubles
- Last updated on: September 10, 2021.

David Wagner (born March 4, 1974) is an American wheelchair tennis player. Paralyzed from the mid-chest down and with thirty percent function in his hands, he competes in the quad division. He plays by taping the tennis racket to his hand. He is currently ranked number three in the world in singles and number two in doubles.

== Early life ==
Wagner was born in Fullerton, California, and grew up in Walla Walla, Washington. He played basketball in high school and tennis in college. He became a quadriplegic at age 21 while visiting a friend in Redondo Beach, California, during summer break. He and his friends were playing frisbee on the beach and Wagner began chasing after the frisbee through shallow water. He attempted to jump over a wave, but the wave caught his feet, spun him around, and he landed head-first in the sand, leaving him paralyzed. He took a year off of college and began practicing table tennis as part of his rehabilitation. He won a national competition in that sport three years in a row, from 1997 to 1999.

== Tennis career ==
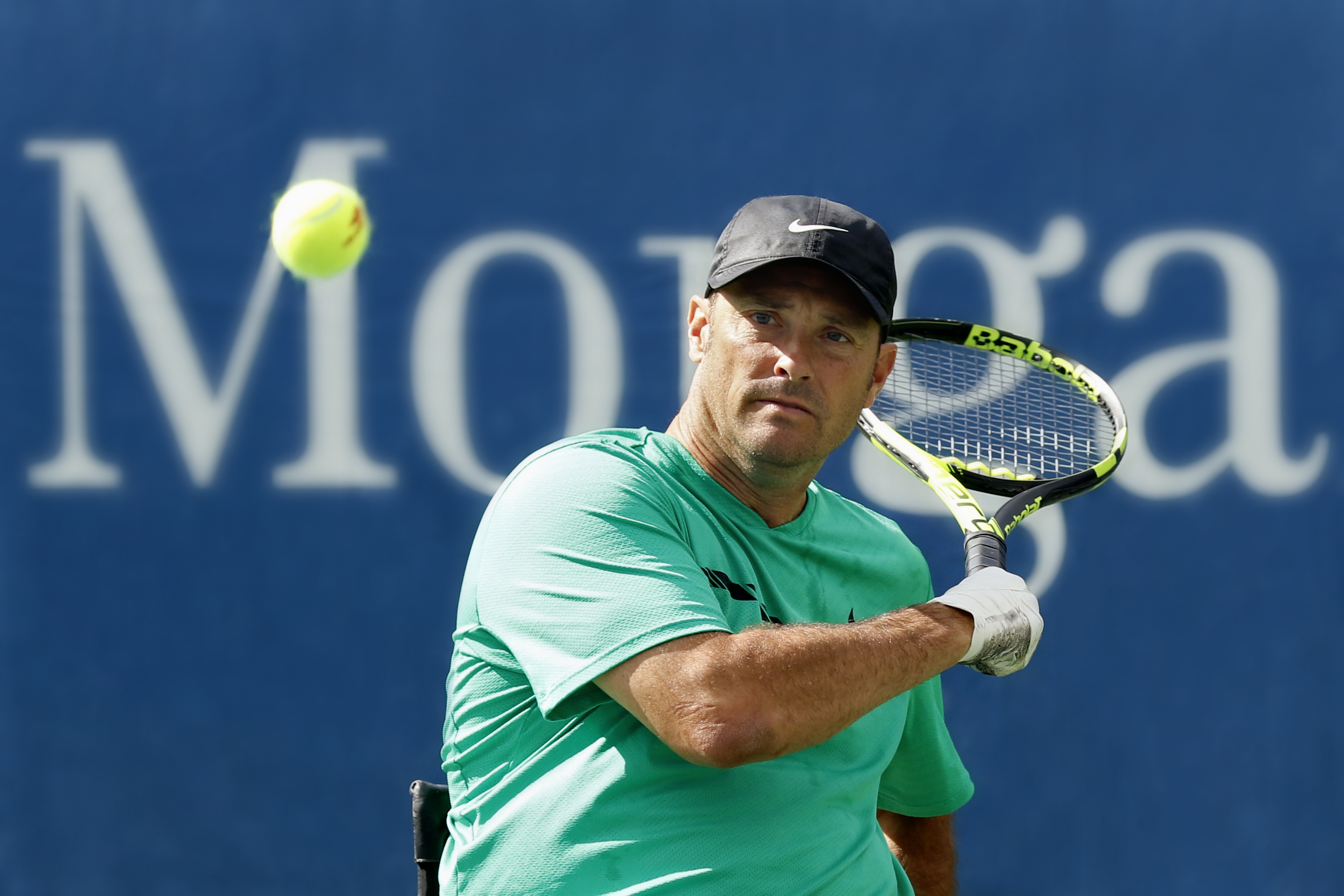
Wagner at the 2017 US Open

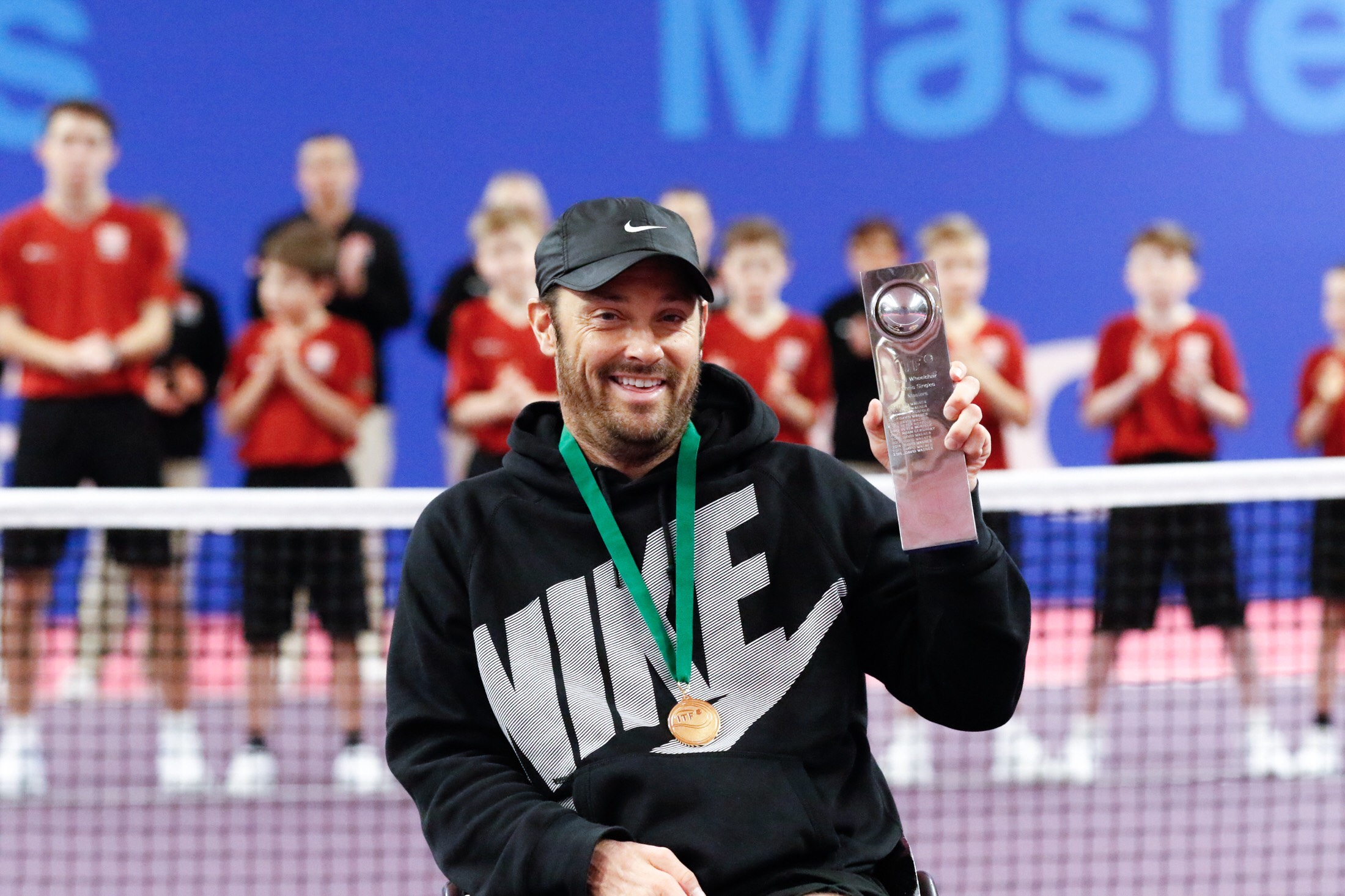
Wagner at the 2017 NEC Wheelchair Tennis Masters

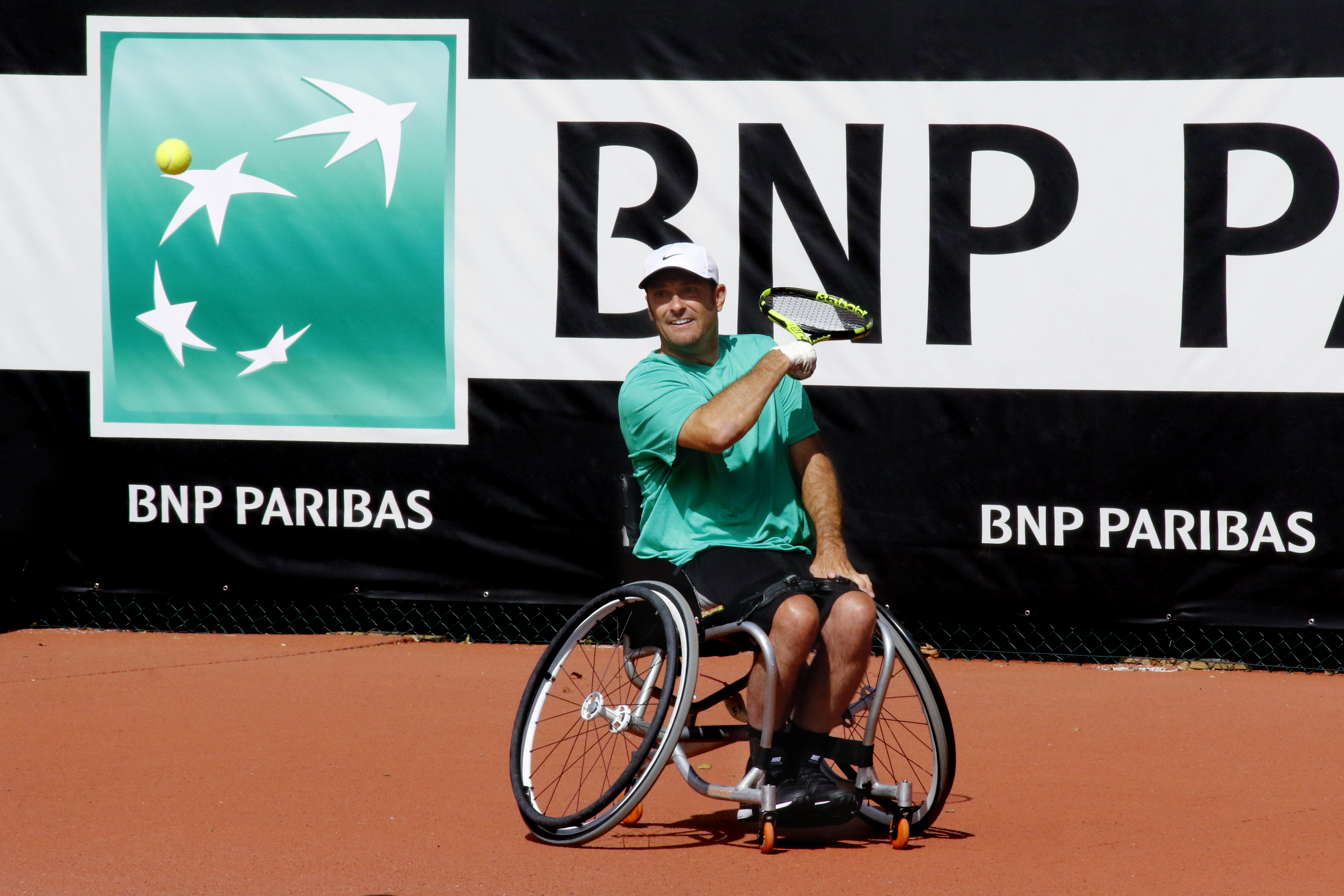
Wagner at the 2017 BNP Open de France

In 1999, at age 25, he attended a wheelchair tennis training camp set up by Rick Draney, then the top-ranked quadriplegic tennis player in the world. Wagner immediately loved the sport and by 2002 was the number one ranked U.S. quadriplegic player.

In 2002, Wagner reached number one in the ITF world rankings in quad doubles, and in 2003, he reached number one in the quad singles world rankings as well. The 2004 Summer Paralympics were the first Paralympic Games to include the quad division. Wagner won the gold medal in Quad Doubles with partner Nick Taylor and the silver medal in singles.

In 2007, he participated in the first Quad competition held at the U.S. Open, winning doubles with Taylor and taking second place in singles behind Peter Norfolk. Wagner had urged the United States Tennis Association to include a quadriplegic division at the event; the U.S. Open was the first of the Grand Slam tournaments to do so. The Australian Open followed suit the next year, with Wagner finishing runner-up in singles, and winning doubles with Taylor. The US Open and the Australian Open were the only Grand Slams to offer a Quad wheelchair tennis draw, until 2019. The first Quad Wheelchair Doubles exhibition event was held at Wimbledon in 2018. Wagner won the event, partnering Andy Lapthorne. Later that year, Wimbledon announced that they would offer a singles and doubles quad draw as of 2019. Roland Garros followed with a similar announcement a few months later. Wagner, partnering Alcott, won the inaugural Roland Garros Quad Doubles draw.

At the 2008 Beijing Paralympics, Wagner and Taylor won gold in doubles and competed against each other in the bronze medal match of the singles event, with Wagner taking the match and the medal. At the 2012 London Paralympics, Wagner and Taylor won one more gold medal in doubles, defeating the British team of Andy Lapthorne and Peter Norfolk in the final. Wagner also won a silver medal in singles. At the final, he played against Israel's Noam Gershony. At the 2016 Summer Paralympics, Wagner clinched two more medals, a Silver in Quad Doubles and a Bronze in Quad Singles.

According to ITF world rankings, Wagner had been consistently ranked in the top three of the quad division, in both singles and doubles, from 2002 until 2020. He has finished as Year-End Number 1 a total of eight times in singles, as well as fourteen times in doubles, as of December 2017. Wagner had been crowned doubles champion at every U.S. Open Quad Doubles draw, since the Grand Slam started offering a Quad Draw, in 2007, until 2019, when Wagner with partner Bryan Barten lost to Alcott and Lapthorne. He has also been crowned doubles champion in all editions of the French Open Quad Doubles draw so far, playing with three different partners.

Besides competing, Wagner is often invited to teach in wheelchair camps and clinics in the United States, where he encourages both kids and adults to become involved with the sport.

== Personal life ==
Wagner graduated with an elementary education degree in 2000. In 2001, when he had to choose between teaching and playing tennis, he decided to become a full time wheelchair tennis player. From 2006 until 2014 he lived in Hillsboro, Oregon, and then moved to Chula Vista, California. He trains at the Chula Vista Elite Athlete Training Center, (formerly Chula Vista Olympic Training Center) where he is the only tennis player in residence.

== Tennis career statistics ==
=== Grand Slam performance timelines ===
Key
W	F	SF	QF	#R	RR	Q#	DNQ	A	NH

(W) winner; (F) finalist; (SF) semifinalist; (QF) quarterfinalist; (#R) rounds 4, 3, 2, 1; (RR) round-robin stage; (Q#) qualification round; (DNQ) did not qualify; (A) absent; (NH) not held; (SR) strike rate (events won / competed); (W–L) win–loss record.
To avoid confusion and double counting, these charts are updated at the conclusion of a tournament or when the player's participation has ended.

Current through the 2026 French Open.

==== Quad singles ====
Tournament	2007	2008	2009	2010	2011	2012	2013	2014	2015	2016	2017	2018	2019	2020	2021	2022	2023	2024	2025	2026	SR
Australian Open	NH	F	F	F	W	F	W	W	F	F	RR	F	F	RR	QF	QF	SF	1R	1R	A	3 / 18
French Open	Not held												F	SF	SF	SF	SF	QF	A	A	0 / 6
Wimbledon	Not held												SF	NH	SF	SF	QF	QF	A		0 / 5
US Open	F	NH	F	W	W	NH	F	F	F	NH	W	F	RR	RR	QF	SF	QF	NH	1R		3 / 14

==== Quad doubles ====
Tournament	2007	2008	2009	2010	2011	2012	2013	2014	2015	2016	2017	2018	2019	2020	2021	2022	2023	2024	2025	2026	SR
Australian Open	NH	W	W	W	F	F	W	W	W	W	W	F	F	F	F	W	SF	W	QF	A	10 / 18
French Open	Not held												W	W	W	SF	SF	SF	A	A	3 / 6
Wimbledon	Not held											W (Note: Exhibition match.)	F	NH	W	F	SF	SF	A		1 / 5
US Open	W	NH	W	W	W	NH	W	W	W	NH	W	W	F	F	SF	SF	QF	NH	QF		9 / 14

===== Quad doubles: 31 (23 titles, 8 runner-ups) =====
Result	Year	Tournament	Surface	Partner	Opponents	Score
Win	2007	US Open	Hard	(United States) Nick Taylor	(Canada) Sarah Hunter (United Kingdom) Peter Norfolk	6–1, 4–6, 6–0
Win	2008	Australian Open	Hard	(United States) Nick Taylor	(Canada) Sarah Hunter (United Kingdom) Peter Norfolk	5–7, 6–0, [10–3]
Win	2009	Australian Open (2)	Hard	(United States) Nick Taylor	(United Kingdom) Peter Norfolk (Sweden) Johan Andersson	6–2, 6–3
Win	2009	US Open (2)	Hard	(United States) Nick Taylor	(Sweden) Johan Andersson (United Kingdom) Peter Norfolk	6–1, 6–7^{(5–7)}, 6–3
Win	2010	Australian Open (3)	Hard	(United States) Nick Taylor	(United Kingdom) Peter Norfolk (Sweden) Johan Andersson	6–2, 7–6^{(7–5)}
Win	2010	US Open (3)	Hard	(United States) Nick Taylor	(Sweden) Johan Andersson (United Kingdom) Peter Norfolk	6–1, 7–5, 7–6^{(7–4)}
Loss	2011	Australian Open	Hard	(United States) Nick Taylor	(United Kingdom) Andy Lapthorne (United Kingdom) Peter Norfolk	3–6, 3–6
Win	2011	US Open (4)	Hard	(United States) Nick Taylor	(United Kingdom) Peter Norfolk (Israel) Noam Gershony	Walkover
Loss	2012	Australian Open	Hard	(Israel) Noam Gershony	(United Kingdom) Andy Lapthorne (United Kingdom) Peter Norfolk	4–6, 2–6
Win	2013	Australian Open (4)	Hard	(United States) Nick Taylor	(United Kingdom) Andy Lapthorne (Sweden) Anders Hard	6–2, 6–3
Win	2013	US Open (5)	Hard	(United States) Nick Taylor	(United Kingdom) Andy Lapthorne (South Africa) Lucas Sithole	6–0, 2–6, 6–3
Win	2014	Australian Open (5)	Hard	(United Kingdom) Andy Lapthorne	(Australia) Dylan Alcott (South Africa) Lucas Sithole	6–4, 6–4
Win	2014	US Open (6)	Hard	(United States) Nick Taylor	(United Kingdom) Andy Lapthorne (South Africa) Lucas Sithole	6–3, 7–5
Win	2015	Australian Open (6)	Hard	(United Kingdom) Andy Lapthorne	(Australia) Dylan Alcott (South Africa) Lucas Sithole	6–0, 3–6, 6–2
Win	2015	US Open (7)	Hard	(United States) Nick Taylor	(Australia) Dylan Alcott (United Kingdom) Andy Lapthorne	4–6, 6–2, [10–7]
Win	2016	Australian Open (7)	Hard	(South Africa) Lucas Sithole	(Australia) Dylan Alcott (United Kingdom) Andy Lapthorne	6–1, 6–3
Win	2017	Australian Open (8)	Hard	(United Kingdom) Andy Lapthorne	(Australia) Dylan Alcott (Australia) Heath Davidson	6–3, 6–3
Win	2017	US Open (8)	Hard	(United Kingdom) Andy Lapthorne	(Australia) Dylan Alcott (United States) Bryan Barten	7–5, 6–2
Loss	2018	Australian Open	Hard	(United Kingdom) Andy Lapthorne	(Australia) Dylan Alcott (Australia) Heath Davidson	0–6, 7–6^{(7–5)}, [6–10]
Win	2018	US Open (9)	Hard	(United Kingdom) Andy Lapthorne	(Australia) Dylan Alcott (United States) Bryan Barten	3–6, 6–0, [10–4]
Loss	2019	Australian Open	Hard	(United Kingdom) Andy Lapthorne	(Australia) Dylan Alcott (Australia) Heath Davidson	3–6, 7–6^{(8–6)}, [10–12]
Win	2019	French Open	Clay	(Australia) Dylan Alcott	(Brazil) Ymanitu Silva (Japan) Koji Sugeno	6–3, 6–3
Loss	2019	Wimbledon	Grass	(Japan) Koji Sugeno	(Australia) Dylan Alcott (United Kingdom) Andy Lapthorne	2–6, 6–7^{(4–7)}
Loss	2019	US Open	Hard	(United States) Bryan Barten	(Australia) Dylan Alcott (United Kingdom) Andy Lapthorne	7–6^{(7–5)}, 1–6, [6–10]
Loss	2020	Australian Open	Hard	(United Kingdom) Andy Lapthorne	(Australia) Dylan Alcott (Australia) Heath Davidson	4–6, 3–6
Loss	2020	US Open	Hard	(Netherlands) Sam Schroder	(Australia) Dylan Alcott (United Kingdom) Andy Lapthorne	6–3, 4–6, [8–10]
Win	2020	French Open (2)	Clay	(Netherlands) Sam Schroder	(Australia) Dylan Alcott (United Kingdom) Andy Lapthorne	4–6, 7–5, [10–8]
Loss	2021	Australian Open	Hard	(United Kingdom) Andy Lapthorne	(Australia) Dylan Alcott (Australia) Heath Davidson	2–6, 6–3, [7–10]
Win	2021	French Open (3)	Clay	(United Kingdom) Andy Lapthorne	(Australia) Dylan Alcott (Netherlands) Sam Schröder	7–6^{(7–1)}, 4–6, [10–7]
Win	2021	Wimbledon (2)	Grass	(United Kingdom) Andy Lapthorne	(Australia) Dylan Alcott (Netherlands) Sam Schröder	6–1, 3–6, 6–4
Win	2022	Australian Open (9)	Hard	(United Kingdom) Andy Lapthorne	(Netherlands) Niels Vink (Netherlands) Sam Schröder	2–6, 6–4, [10–7]
Loss	2022	Wimbledon	Grass	(United Kingdom) Andy Lapthorne	(Netherlands) Niels Vink (Netherlands) Sam Schröder	7–6^{(7–4)}, 2–6, 3–6
Win	2024	Australian Open (10)	Hard	(United Kingdom) Andy Lapthorne	(South Africa) Donald Ramphadi (Israel) Guy Sasson	6–4, 3–6, [10–2]

== See also ==
- List of quad wheelchair tennis champions

Preceded by Peter Norfolk; Peter Norfolk; Peter Norfolk; Dylan Alcott	Year End Number 1 – Quad singles 2005; 2007; 2010–2014; 2017	Succeeded by Peter Norfolk; Peter Norfolk; Dylan Alcott; Dylan Alcott
Preceded by Shraga Weinberg	Year End Number 1 – Quad doubles 2004–2018	Succeeded by Incumbent
