= 2021 French Open – Wheelchair women's doubles =

Wheelchair women's doubles
- 2021 French Open

Final
- Champions: (Netherlands) Diede de Groot (Netherlands) Aniek van Koot
- Runners-up: (Japan) Yui Kamiji (United Kingdom) Jordanne Whiley
- Score: 6–3, 6–4

Events
Singles	men	women		boys	girls
Doubles	men	women	mixed	boys	girls
WC Singles	men	women	quad
WC Doubles	men	women	quad
Legends	−45	45+	women
- French Open

Three-time defending champions Diede de Groot and Aniek van Koot defeated Yui Kamiji and Jordanne Whiley in the final, 6–3, 6–4 to win the women's doubles wheelchair tennis title at the 2021 French Open.

== Seeds ==
1. (Netherlands) Diede de Groot / (Netherlands) Aniek van Koot (champions)
2. (Japan) Yui Kamiji / (United Kingdom) Jordanne Whiley (final)

== Draw ==
Key

- Q = Qualifier
- WC = Wild card
- LL = Lucky loser
- Alt = Alternate
- ITF = ITF entry
- PR = Protected ranking
- SR = Special ranking
- SE = Special exempt
- JE = Junior exempt
- JR = Junior Accelerator Programme entrant
- CO = College Accelerator Programme entrant
- NG = Next Gen Accelerator Program entrant
- w/o = Walkover
- r = Retired
- d = Defaulted

=== Finals ===
Semifinals
1	(Netherlands) Diede de Groot (Netherlands) Aniek van Koot	6	6
(United States) Dana Mathewson (South Africa) Kgothatso Montjane	4	3
(Colombia) Angélica Bernal (France) Emmanuelle Mörch	0	3
2	(Japan) Yui Kamiji (United Kingdom) Jordanne Whiley	6	6

Final
1	(Netherlands) Diede de Groot (Netherlands) Aniek van Koot	6	6
2	(Japan) Yui Kamiji (United Kingdom) Jordanne Whiley	3	4
