= 2021 French Open – Wheelchair quad singles =

Wheelchair quad singles
- 2021 French Open

Final
- Champion: (Australia) Dylan Alcott
- Runner-up: (Netherlands) Sam Schröder
- Score: 6–4, 6–2

Events
Singles	men	women		boys	girls
Doubles	men	women	mixed	boys	girls
WC Singles	men	women	quad
WC Doubles	men	women	quad
Legends	−45	45+	women
- French Open

Two-time defending champion Dylan Alcott defeated Sam Schröder in the final, 6–4, 6–2 to win the quad singles wheelchair tennis title at the 2021 French Open. It was the second step towards an eventual Golden Slam for Alcott.

== Seeds ==
1. (Australia) Dylan Alcott (champion)
2. (United Kingdom) Andy Lapthorne (semifinals)

== Draw ==
Key

- Q = Qualifier
- WC = Wild card
- LL = Lucky loser
- Alt = Alternate
- ITF = ITF entry
- PR = Protected ranking
- SR = Special ranking
- SE = Special exempt
- JE = Junior exempt
- JR = Junior Accelerator Programme entrant
- CO = College Accelerator Programme entrant
- NG = Next Gen Accelerator Program entrant
- w/o = Walkover
- r = Retired
- d = Defaulted

=== Finals ===
Semifinals
1	(Australia) Dylan Alcott	6	6
WC	(United States) David Wagner	3	3
(Netherlands) Sam Schröder	6	6
2	(United Kingdom) Andy Lapthorne	1	4

Final
1	(Australia) Dylan Alcott	6	6
(Netherlands) Sam Schröder	4	2
3rd place playoff
WC	(United States) David Wagner	2	6^{5}
2	(United Kingdom) Andy Lapthorne	6	7^{7}
