= 2011 US Open – Wheelchair quad doubles =

Wheelchair quad doubles
- 2011 US Open

Final
- Champions: (United States) David Wagner (United States) Nick Taylor
- Runners-up: (United Kingdom) Peter Norfolk (Israel) Noam Gershony
- Score: walkover

Events
Singles	men	women		boys	girls
Doubles	men	women	mixed	boys	girls
WC Singles	men	women	quad
WC Doubles	men	women	quad
Legends	men	women	mixed
← 2010 ·	US Open	· 2013 →

Three-time defending champions David Wagner and Nick Taylor won the quad doubles wheelchair tennis title at the 2011 US Open following the withdrawal of Peter Norfolk and Noam Gershony from the final.

== Main draw ==
=== Key ===
- Q = Qualifier
- WC = Wild card
- LL = Lucky loser
- Alt = Alternate
- SE = Special exempt
- PR = Protected ranking
- ITF = ITF entry
- JE = Junior exempt
- w/o = Walkover
- r = Retired
- d = Defaulted
- SR = Special ranking

=== Final ===
Finals
(United States) David Wagner (United States) Nick Taylor	w/o
(United Kingdom) Peter Norfolk (Israel) Noam Gershony
