= 2010 US Open – Wheelchair women's doubles =

Wheelchair women's doubles
- 2010 US Open

Final
- Champions: (Netherlands) Esther Vergeer (Netherlands) Sharon Walraven
- Runners-up: (Australia) Daniela Di Toro (Netherlands) Aniek van Koot
- Score: 6–3, 6–3

Events
| Singles | men | women | | boys | girls |
| Doubles | men | women | mixed | boys | girls |
| WC Singles | men | women | quad |
| WC Doubles | men | women | quad |
| Legends | men | women | mixed |
| ← 2009 · | US Open | · 2011 → |

Four-time defending champion Esther Vergeer and her partner Sharon Walraven defeated Daniela Di Toro and Aniek van Koot in the final, 6–3, 6–3 to win the women's doubles wheelchair tennis title at the 2010 US Open.

Korie Homan and Vergeer were the reigning champions, but Homan did not participate.

== Seeds ==
1. (Australia) Daniela Di Toro / (Netherlands) Aniek van Koot (final)
2. (Netherlands) Esther Vergeer / (Netherlands) Sharon Walraven (champions)

== Doubles ==
=== Key ===
- Q = Qualifier
- WC = Wild card
- LL = Lucky loser
- Alt = Alternate
- ITF = ITF entry
- PR = Protected ranking
- SR = Special ranking
- SE = Special exempt
- JE = Junior exempt
- JR = Junior Accelerator Programme entrant
- CO = College Accelerator Programme entrant
- NG = Next Gen Accelerator Program entrant
- w/o = Walkover
- r = Retired
- d = Defaulted

=== Finals ===
Semifinals
1 | (Australia) Daniela Di Toro (Netherlands) Aniek van Koot | 6 | 6
(Belgium) Annick Sevenans (United States) Mackenzie Soldan | 2 | 3
(France) Florence Alix-Gravellier (Netherlands) Jiske Griffioen | 4 | 4
2 | (Netherlands) Esther Vergeer (Netherlands) Sharon Walraven | 6 | 6

Finals
1 | (Australia) Daniela Di Toro (Netherlands) Aniek van Koot | 3 | 3
2 | (Netherlands) Esther Vergeer (Netherlands) Sharon Walraven | 6 | 6
