= 2021 French Open – Boys' singles =

Boys' singles
- 2021 French Open

Final
- Champion: (France) Luca Van Assche
- Runner-up: (France) Arthur Fils
- Score: 6–4, 6–2

Events
Singles	men	women		boys	girls
Doubles	men	women	mixed	boys	girls
WC Singles	men	women	quad
WC Doubles	men	women	quad
Legends	−45	45+	women
- French Open

Luca Van Assche won the title, defeating Arthur Fils in an all-French final, 6–4, 6–2. This was the first Grand Slam junior tournament with all-French semifinalists.

Dominic Stricker was the defending champion, but was no longer eligible to participate in junior events.

== Seeds ==
1. (China) Shang Juncheng (quarterfinals)
2. (United States) Bruno Kuzuhara (third round)
3. (Brazil) Pedro Boscardin Dias (third round)
4. (United Kingdom) Jack Pinnington Jones (first round)
5. (France) Giovanni Mpetshi Perricard (semifinals)
6. (Switzerland) Jérôme Kym (second round)
7. (United States) Dali Blanch (second round)
8. (Spain) Daniel Rincón (quarterfinals)

9. (France) Sean Cuenin (semifinals)
10. (United States) Alexander Bernard (first round)
11. (Belgium) Pierre Yves Bailly (second round)
12. (Estonia) Mark Lajal (first round)
13. (France) Luca Van Assche (champion)
14. (France) Arthur Fils (final)
15. (United States) Samir Banerjee (first round)
16. (Ukraine) Viacheslav Bielinskyi (quarterfinals)

Click on the seed number of a player to go to their draw section.

== Draw ==
Key

- Q = Qualifier
- WC = Wild card
- LL = Lucky loser
- Alt = Alternate
- ITF = ITF entry
- PR = Protected ranking
- SR = Special ranking
- SE = Special exempt
- JE = Junior exempt
- JR = Junior Accelerator Programme entrant
- CO = College Accelerator Programme entrant
- NG = Next Gen Accelerator Program entrant
- w/o = Walkover
- r = Retired
- d = Defaulted

=== Finals ===
Quarterfinals
1	(China) Shang Juncheng	4	5
9	(France) Sean Cuenin	6	7
13	(France) Luca Van Assche	7^{10}	6
(Spain) Daniel Mérida	6^{8}	4
5	(France) Giovanni Mpetshi Perricard	6	6
16	(Ukraine) Viacheslav Bielinskyi	2	1
8	(Spain) Daniel Rincón	2	3
14	(France) Arthur Fils	6	6

Semifinals
9	(France) Sean Cuenin	5	4
13	(France) Luca Van Assche	7	6
5	(France) Giovanni Mpetshi Perricard	6	3	6^{5}
14	(France) Arthur Fils	3	6	7^{7}

Final
13	(France) Luca Van Assche	6	6
14	(France) Arthur Fils	4	2

=== Top half ===
==== Section 1 ====
First round
1	(China) Shang Juncheng	6	5	7
(Australia) Philip Sekulic	4	7	5
WC	(France) Arthur Géa	2	6	6
(Denmark) Elmer Møller	6	2	1
(France) Max Westphal	6	3	4
(Sweden) Leo Borg	3	6	6
(Germany) Max Hans Rehberg	6	7
15	(United States) Samir Banerjee	4	5
9	(France) Sean Cuenin	6	6
(United Kingdom) Lui Maxted	4	3
(United States) Ozan Colak	7^{7}	1	3
(Ukraine) German Samofalov	6^{5}	6	6
(Austria) Marko Andrejic	3	0
WC	(France) Gabriel Debru	6	6
(Jordan) Abedallah Shelbayh	4	1
6	(Switzerland) Jérôme Kym	6	6

Second round
1	(China) J Shang	4	6	6
WC	(France) A Géa	6	3	2
(Sweden) L Borg	1	7^{7}	6
(Germany) MH Rehberg	6	6^{5}	3
9	(France) S Cuenin	7^{7}	6
(Ukraine) G Samofalov	6^{2}	1
WC	(France) G Debru	6	7
6	(Switzerland) J Kym	2	5

Third round
1	(China) J Shang	7^{7}	3	7^{7}
(Sweden) L Borg	6^{5}	6	6^{4}
9	(France) S Cuenin	7^{7}	6
WC	(France) G Debru	6^{4}	4

Quarterfinals
1	(China) J Shang	4	5
9	(France) S Cuenin	6	7

==== Section 2 ====
First round
3	(Brazil) Pedro Boscardin Dias	6	6
WC	(France) Joshua Dous Karpenschif	3	3
(Poland) Aleksander Orlikowski	5	3
(Serbia) Hamad Međedović	7	6
(United States) Aidan Mayo	6^{0}	6	6
(Czech Republic) Matthew William Donald	7^{7}	4	2
(Bulgaria) Petr Nesterov	2	3
13	(France) Luca Van Assche	6	6
11	(Belgium) Pierre Yves Bailly	6	6
(United States) Jack Anthrop	1	3
(France) Sascha Gueymard Wayenburg	3	6	7
(Russia) Igor Kudriashov	6	3	5
(Peru) Gonzalo Bueno	2	2
(Spain) Daniel Mérida	6	6
(France) Mehdi Sadaoui	6^{1}	3
7	(United States) Dali Blanch	7^{7}	6

Second round
3	(Brazil) P Boscardin Dias	6^{7}	6	6
(Serbia) H Međedović	7^{9}	3	4
(United States) A Mayo	2	3
13	(France) L Van Assche	6	6
11	(Belgium) PY Bailly	6	2	4
(France) S Gueymard Wayenburg	2	6	6
(Spain) D Mérida	6	6
7	(United States) Dal Blanch	3	4

Third round
3	(Brazil) P Boscardin Dias	2	4
13	(France) L Van Assche	6	6
(France) S Gueymard Wayenburg	6	2	3
(Spain) D Mérida	3	6	6

Quarterfinals
13	(France) L Van Assche	7^{10}	6
(Spain) D Mérida	6^{8}	4

=== Bottom half ===
==== Section 3 ====
First round
5	(France) Giovanni Mpetshi Perricard	6	6
(Sweden) Måns Dahlberg	3	4
(Serbia) Marko Topo	6	7^{9}
(Colombia) Johan Alexander Rodríguez Rodríguez	1	6^{7}
(Slovakia) Peter Benjamín Privara	6	6
(Belgium) Martin Katz	0	2
WC	(France) Charlélie Cosnet	7^{7}	7
10	(United States) Alexander Bernard	6^{5}	5
16	(Ukraine) Viacheslav Bielinskyi	3	6	6
(United States) Ethan Quinn	6	3	3
WC	(France) Thibault Verdier	2	6	6
(Germany) Mika Lipp	6	2	3
(Hong Kong) Coleman Wong	6	6
WC	(France) Théo Papamalamis	2	1
(Poland) Maks Kaśnikowski	6	6
4	(United Kingdom) Jack Pinnington Jones	3	4

Second round
5	(France) G Mpetshi Perricard	6	1	7
(Serbia) M Topo	4	6	5
(Slovakia) PB Privara	7^{12}	6
WC	(France) C Cosnet	6^{10}	3
16	(Ukraine) V Bielinskyi	6	6
WC	(France) T Verdier	2	3
(Hong Kong) C Wong	3	6	3
(Poland) M Kaśnikowski	6	3	6

Third round
5	(France) G Mpetshi Perricard	6	6
(Slovakia) PB Privara	2	0
16	(Ukraine) V Bielinskyi	2	6	6
(Poland) M Kaśnikowski	6	3	1

Quarterfinals
5	(France) G Mpetshi Perricard	6	6
16	(Ukraine) V Bielinskyi	2	1

==== Section 4 ====
First round
8	(Spain) Daniel Rincón	6	6
(Paraguay) Adolfo Daniel Vallejo	3	3
(Portugal) Miguel Gomes	3	6	6^{5}
WC	(France) Robin Bertrand	6	3	7^{7}
(United States) Victor Lilov	6	6
WC	(France) Antoine Ghibaudo	2	2
(Italy) Luca Nardi	7	4	6
12	(Estonia) Mark Lajal	5	6	0
14	(France) Arthur Fils	6	6
(Japan) Kokoro Isomura	4	3
(Brazil) João Victor Couto Loureiro	7^{7}	3	6
(Ecuador) Álvaro Guillén Meza	6^{1}	6	2
(Russia) Konstantin Zhzhenov	4	7^{9}	6^{3}
(Croatia) Mili Poljičak	6	6^{7}	7^{7}
(Czech Republic) Adam Jurajda	6^{2}	0
2	(United States) Bruno Kuzuhara	7^{7}	6

Second round
8	(Spain) D Rincón	6	6
WC	(France) R Bertrand	2	3
(United States) V Lilov	6	2
(Italy) L Nardi	2	2^{r}
14	(France) A Fils	6	6
(Brazil) JV Couto Loureiro	3	4
(Croatia) M Poljičak	4	3
2	(United States) B Kuzuhara	6	6

Third round
8	(Spain) D Rincón	6	6
(United States) V Lilov	3	3
14	(France) A Fils	6	7^{7}
2	(United States) B Kuzuhara	4	6^{2}

Quarterfinals
8	(Spain) D Rincón	2	3
14	(France) A Fils	6	6
