= 2009 Australian Open – Wheelchair quad doubles =

Wheelchair quad doubles
- 2009 Australian Open

Final
- Champion: (United States) Nicholas Taylor (United States) David Wagner
- Runner-up: (Sweden) Johan Andersson (United Kingdom) Peter Norfolk
- Score: 6–2, 6–3

Events
Singles	men	women		boys	girls
Doubles	men	women	mixed	boys	girls
WC Singles	men	women	quad
WC Doubles	men	women	quad
Legends	men	women	mixed
- Australian Open

Defending champions Nicholas Taylor and David Wagner defeated Johan Andersson and Peter Norfolk in the final, 6–2, 6–3 to win the quad doubles wheelchair tennis title at the 2009 Australian Open.

== Main draw ==
Key

- Q = Qualifier
- WC = Wild card
- LL = Lucky loser
- Alt = Alternate
- ITF = ITF entry
- PR = Protected ranking
- SR = Special ranking
- SE = Special exempt
- JE = Junior exempt
- JR = Junior Accelerator Programme entrant
- CO = College Accelerator Programme entrant
- NG = Next Gen Accelerator Program entrant
- w/o = Walkover
- r = Retired
- d = Defaulted

=== Finals ===
Finals
(United States) Nicholas Taylor (United States) David Wagner	6	6
(Sweden) Johan Andersson (United Kingdom) Peter Norfolk	2	3
