= 2011 US Open – Girls' doubles =

Girls' doubles
- 2011 US Open

Final
- Champions: (Russia) Irina Khromacheva (Netherlands) Demi Schuurs
- Runners-up: (United States) Gabrielle Andrews (United States) Taylor Townsend
- Score: 6–4, 5–7, [10–5]

Events
Singles	men	women		boys	girls
Doubles	men	women	mixed	boys	girls
WC Singles	men	women	quad
WC Doubles	men	women	quad
Legends	men	women	mixed
- US Open

Tímea Babos and Sloane Stephens were the defending champions; however, they didn't participate this year.

Irina Khromacheva and Demi Schuurs won the tournament, defeating Gabrielle Andrews and Taylor Townsend in the final, 6–4, 5–7, [10–5].

== Seeds ==
1. (Netherlands) Indy de Vroome / (Russia) Yulia Putintseva (first round, withdrew)
2. (Argentina) Victoria Bosio / (Paraguay) Montserrat González (quarterfinals)
3. (Australia) Ashleigh Barty / (Ecuador) Doménica González (second round)
4. (United States) Victoria Duval / (Estonia) Anett Kontaveit (first round)
5. (United States) Madison Keys / (United States) Grace Min (quarterfinals)
6. (Russia) Irina Khromacheva / (Netherlands) Demi Schuurs (champions)
7. (Czech Republic) Klára Fabíková / (Slovakia) Anna Karolína Schmiedlová (second round)
8. (Czech Republic) Jesika Malečková / (Belarus) Aliaksandra Sasnovich (semifinals)

== Draw ==
Key

- Q = Qualifier
- WC = Wild card
- LL = Lucky loser
- Alt = Alternate
- ITF = ITF entry
- PR = Protected ranking
- SR = Special ranking
- SE = Special exempt
- JE = Junior exempt
- JR = Junior Accelerator Programme entrant
- CO = College Accelerator Programme entrant
- NG = Next Gen Accelerator Program entrant
- w/o = Walkover
- r = Retired
- d = Defaulted

=== Finals ===
Semifinals
8	(Czech Republic) Jesika Malečková (Belarus) Aliaksandra Sasnovich	1	4
WC	(United States) Gabrielle Andrews (United States) Taylor Townsend	6	6
6	(Russia) Irina Khromacheva (Netherlands) Demi Schuurs	6	6
(United States) Nicole Gibbs (United States) Kyle McPhillips	3	3

Final
WC	(United States) Gabrielle Andrews (United States) Taylor Townsend	4	7	[5]
6	(Russia) Irina Khromacheva (Netherlands) Demi Schuurs	6	5	[10]

=== Top half ===
First round
1	(Netherlands) Indy de Vroome (Russia) Yulia Putintseva
WC	(United States) Samantha Crawford (United States) Catherine Harrison	w/o
(Ecuador) Marie Elise Casares (Israel) Valeria Patiuk	7^{7}	1	[10]
(Japan) Makoto Ninomiya (Japan) Risa Ozaki	6^{5}	6	[5]
(United States) Stephanie Nauta (United States) Blair Shankle	6	5	[10]
(Romania) Elena-Teodora Cadar (Japan) Nao Hibino	3	7	[3]
(Austria) Barbara Haas (Czech Republic) Petra Rohanová	3	0
8	(Czech Republic) Jesika Malečková (Belarus) Aliaksandra Sasnovich	6	6
4	(United States) Victoria Duval (Estonia) Anett Kontaveit	3	6	[7]
WC	(United States) Gabrielle Andrews (United States) Taylor Townsend	6	3	[10]
(Bolivia) María Inés Deheza (Bolivia) María Paula Deheza	6	6
(Turkey) Başak Eraydın (New Zealand) Emily Fanning	3	2
(Russia) Daria Gavrilova (Ukraine) Ganna Poznikhirenko	6	6^{5}	[8]
(South Korea) Jang Su-jeong (South Korea) Lee So-ra	3	7^{7}	[10]
(Sweden) Ellen Allgurin (Kazakhstan) Anna Danilina	6	1	[8]
5	(United States) Madison Keys (United States) Grace Min	4	6	[10]

Second round
WC	(United States) S Crawford (United States) C Harrison	6	6
(Ecuador) ME Casares (Israel) V Patiuk	3	4
(United States) S Nauta (United States) B Shankle	2	7^{8}	[6]
8	(Czech Republic) J Malečková (Belarus) A Sasnovich	6	6^{6}	[10]
WC	(United States) G Andrews (United States) T Townsend	6	6
(Bolivia) MI Deheza (Bolivia) MP Deheza	2	4
(South Korea) S-j Jang (South Korea) S-r Lee	6	4	[2]
5	(United States) M Keys (United States) G Min	2	6	[10]

Quarterfinals
WC	(United States) S Crawford (United States) C Harrison	3	4
8	(Czech Republic) J Malečková (Belarus) A Sasnovich	6	6
WC	(United States) G Andrews (United States) T Townsend	6	4	[10]
5	(United States) M Keys (United States) G Min	3	6	[5]

Semifinals
8	(Czech Republic) J Malečková (Belarus) A Sasnovich	1	4
WC	(United States) G Andrews (United States) T Townsend	6	6

=== Bottom half ===
First round
6	(Russia) Irina Khromacheva (Netherlands) Demi Schuurs	6	3
(Serbia) Natalija Kostić (Japan) Ayaka Okuno	1	0^{r}
WC	(United States) Hayley Carter (United States) Julia Elbaba
(Madagascar) Zarah Razafimahatratra (Canada) Carol Zhao	w/o
(Canada) Françoise Abanda (United States) Christina Makarova	3	4
(Germany) Annika Beck (United States) Krista Hardebeck	6	6
WC	(United States) Jennifer Brady (United States) Anne-Liz Jeukeng
3	(Australia) Ashleigh Barty (Ecuador) Doménica González	w/o
7	(Czech Republic) Klára Fabíková (Slovakia) Anna Karolína Schmiedlová	7^{7}	6
(Croatia) Iva Mekovec (Croatia) Donna Vekić	6^{3}	1
(Canada) Eugenie Bouchard (United States) Lauren Herring
(United States) Nicole Gibbs (United States) Kyle McPhillips	w/o
(Brazil) Beatriz Haddad Maia (Peru) Patricia Kú Flores	4	3
(United States) Alexandra Kiick (United States) Hannah King	6	6
(Mexico) Ana Sofía Sánchez (Mexico) Marcela Zacarías
2	(Argentina) Victoria Bosio (Paraguay) Montserrat González	w/o

Second round
6	(Russia) I Khromacheva (Netherlands) D Schuurs	7^{7}	6
(Madagascar) Z Razafimahatratra (Canada) C Zhao	6^{2}	2
(Germany) A Beck (United States) K Hardebeck	6	7
3	(Australia) A Barty (Ecuador) D González	4	5
7	(Czech Republic) K Fabíková (Slovakia) AK Schmiedlová	4	2
(United States) N Gibbs (United States) K McPhillips	6	6
(United States) A Kiick (United States) H King
2	(Argentina) V Bosio (Paraguay) M González	w/o

Quarterfinals
6	(Russia) I Khromacheva (Netherlands) D Schuurs	7^{7}	6
(Germany) A Beck (United States) K Hardebeck	6^{5}	3
(United States) N Gibbs (United States) K McPhillips	6	6
2	(Argentina) V Bosio (Paraguay) M González	1	4

Semifinals
6	(Russia) I Khromacheva (Netherlands) D Schuurs	6	6
(United States) N Gibbs (United States) K McPhillips	3	3
