= 2009 Australian Open – Wheelchair women's doubles =

Wheelchair women's doubles
- 2009 Australian Open

Final
- Champion: (Netherlands) Korie Homan (Netherlands) Esther Vergeer
- Runner-up: (Poland) Agnieszka Bartczak (Germany) Katharina Krüger
- Score: 6–1, 6–0

Events
Singles	men	women		boys	girls
Doubles	men	women	mixed	boys	girls
WC Singles	men	women	quad
WC Doubles	men	women	quad
Legends	men	women	mixed
← 2008 ·	Australian Open	· 2010 →

Three-time defending champion Esther Vergeer and her partner Korie Homan defeated Agnieszka Bartczak and Katharina Krüger in the final, 6–1, 6–0 to win the women's doubles wheelchair tennis title at the 2009 Australian Open. It was their first step towards an eventual Grand Slam.

Although Jiske Griffioen and Vergeer were the three-time defending champions, they did not compete together. Griffioen partnered Florence Gravellier, but was defeated in the semifinals by Bartczak and Krüger.

== Seeds ==
1. (Netherlands) Korie Homan / (Netherlands) Esther Vergeer (champion)
2. (France) Florence Gravellier / (Netherlands) Jiske Griffioen (semifinals)

== Draw ==
=== Key ===
- Q = Qualifier
- WC = Wild card
- LL = Lucky loser
- Alt = Alternate
- ITF = ITF entry
- PR = Protected ranking
- SR = Special ranking
- SE = Special exempt
- JE = Junior exempt
- JR = Junior Accelerator Programme entrant
- CO = College Accelerator Programme entrant
- NG = Next Gen Accelerator Program entrant
- w/o = Walkover
- r = Retired
- d = Defaulted

=== Finals ===
Semifinals
1	(Netherlands) Korie Homan (Netherlands) Esther Vergeer	6	6
(Australia) Daniela Di Toro (United Kingdom) Lucy Shuker	1	3
(Poland) Agnieszka Bartczak (Germany) Katharina Krüger	7	3	[10]
2	(France) Florence Gravellier (Netherlands) Jiske Griffioen	5	6	[7]

Final
1	(Netherlands) Korie Homan (Netherlands) Esther Vergeer	6	6
(Poland) Agnieszka Bartczak (Germany) Katharina Krüger	1	0
