= 2021 French Open – Wheelchair quad doubles =

Wheelchair quad doubles
- 2021 French Open

Final
- Champions: (United Kingdom) Andy Lapthorne (United States) David Wagner
- Runners-up: (Australia) Dylan Alcott (Netherlands) Sam Schröder
- Score: 7–6^{(7–1)}, 4–6, [10–7]

Events
Singles	men	women		boys	girls
Doubles	men	women	mixed	boys	girls
WC Singles	men	women	quad
WC Doubles	men	women	quad
Legends	−45	45+	women
- French Open

Two-time defending champion David Wagner and his partner Andy Lapthorne defeated the other defending champion Sam Schröder and his partner Dylan Alcott in the final, 7–6^{(7–1)}, 4–6, [10–7] to win the quad doubles wheelchair tennis title at the 2021 French Open. With the win, Lapthorne completed the career Grand Slam.

Schröder and Wagner were the defending champions, but did not participate together.

== Draw ==
Key

- Q = Qualifier
- WC = Wild card
- LL = Lucky loser
- Alt = Alternate
- ITF = ITF entry
- PR = Protected ranking
- SR = Special ranking
- SE = Special exempt
- JE = Junior exempt
- JR = Junior Accelerator Programme entrant
- CO = College Accelerator Programme entrant
- NG = Next Gen Accelerator Program entrant
- w/o = Walkover
- r = Retired
- d = Defaulted

=== Finals ===
Final
(Australia) Dylan Alcott (Netherlands) Sam Schröder	6^{1}	6	[7]
(United Kingdom) Andy Lapthorne (United States) David Wagner	7^{7}	4	[10]
