= 2013 US Open – Wheelchair men's singles =

Wheelchair men's singles
- 2013 US Open

Final
- Champion: (France) Stéphane Houdet
- Runner-up: (Japan) Shingo Kunieda
- Score: 6–2, 6–4

Events
Singles	men	women		boys	girls
Doubles	men	women	mixed	boys	girls
WC Singles	men	women	quad
WC Doubles	men	women	quad
Legends	men	women	mixed
← 2011 ·	US Open	· 2014 →

Stéphane Houdet defeated the four-time defending champion Shingo Kunieda in the final, 6–2, 6–4 to win the men's singles wheelchair tennis title at the 2013 US Open. It was his first US Open singles title and third major singles title overall.

The event was not held in 2012 due to a scheduling conflict with the 2012 Summer Paralympics.

== Seeds ==
1. (Japan) Shingo Kunieda (final)
2. (France) Stéphane Houdet (champion)

== Draw ==
=== Key ===
- Q = Qualifier
- WC = Wild card
- LL = Lucky loser
- Alt = Alternate
- ITF = ITF entry
- PR = Protected ranking
- SR = Special ranking
- SE = Special exempt
- JE = Junior exempt
- JR = Junior Accelerator Programme entrant
- CO = College Accelerator Programme entrant
- NG = Next Gen Accelerator Program entrant
- w/o = Walkover
- r = Retired
- d = Defaulted

=== Finals ===
Quarterfinals
1	(Japan) Shingo Kunieda	6	6
(Argentina) Gustavo Fernández	1	2
(Netherlands) Ronald Vink	2	4
(France) Michaël Jérémiasz	6	6
(Belgium) Joachim Gérard	2	6	4
(United Kingdom) Gordon Reid	6	4	6
(Netherlands) Maikel Scheffers	0	2
2	(France) Stéphane Houdet	6	6

Semifinals
1	(Japan) Shingo Kunieda	7	7
(France) Michaël Jérémiasz	5	5
(United Kingdom) Gordon Reid	6	2	4
2	(France) Stéphane Houdet	1	6	6

Finals
1	(Japan) Shingo Kunieda	2	4
2	(France) Stéphane Houdet	6	6

Preceded by 2011 US Open – Wheelchair men's singles	Grand Slams	Succeeded by 2014 US Open – Wheelchair men's singles
