= 2009 Australian Open – Wheelchair quad singles =

Wheelchair quad singles
- 2009 Australian Open

Final
- Champion: (United Kingdom) Peter Norfolk
- Runner-up: (United States) David Wagner
- Score: 7–6^{(7–5)}, 6–1

Events
Singles	men	women		boys	girls
Doubles	men	women	mixed	boys	girls
WC Singles	men	women	quad
WC Doubles	men	women	quad
Legends	men	women	mixed
- Australian Open

Defending champion Peter Norfolk defeated David Wagner in the final, 7–6^{(7–5)}, 6–1 to win the quad singles wheelchair tennis title at the 2009 Australian Open.

== Draw ==
Key

- Q = Qualifier
- WC = Wild card
- LL = Lucky loser
- Alt = Alternate
- ITF = ITF entry
- PR = Protected ranking
- SR = Special ranking
- SE = Special exempt
- JE = Junior exempt
- JR = Junior Accelerator Programme entrant
- CO = College Accelerator Programme entrant
- NG = Next Gen Accelerator Program entrant
- w/o = Walkover
- r = Retired
- d = Defaulted

=== Final ===
Final
(United Kingdom) Peter Norfolk	7	6
(United States) David Wagner	6^{5}	1

=== Round robin ===
	(United Kingdom) Norfolk	(Sweden) Andersson	(United States) Wagner	(United States) Taylor	RR; W–L	Set; W–L	Game; W–L	Standings
(United Kingdom) Peter Norfolk		6–4, 6–1	2–6, 6–2, 4–6	7–5, 6–1	2-1	5-2	37-25	2
(Sweden) Johan Andersson	4–6, 1–6		0–6, 6–7(4)	3–6, 3–6	0-3	0-6	17-37	4
(United States) David Wagner	6–2, 2–6, 6–4	6–0, 7–6(4)		6–1, 6–1	3-0	6-1	39-20	1
(United States) Nicholas Taylor	5–7, 1–6	6–3, 6–3	1–6, 1–6		1-2	2-4	20-31	3

Standings are determined by: 1. number of wins; 2. number of matches; 3. in two-players-ties, head-to-head records; 4. in three-players-ties, percentage of sets won, or of games won; 5. steering-committee decision.
