= 2021 French Open – Wheelchair men's doubles =

Wheelchair men's doubles
- 2021 French Open

Final
- Champions: (United Kingdom) Alfie Hewett (United Kingdom) Gordon Reid
- Runners-up: (France) Stéphane Houdet (France) Nicolas Peifer
- Score: 6–3, 6–0

Events
Singles	men	women		boys	girls
Doubles	men	women	mixed	boys	girls
WC Singles	men	women	quad
WC Doubles	men	women	quad
Legends	−45	45+	women
- French Open

Defending champions Alfie Hewett and Gordon Reid defeated Stéphane Houdet and Nicolas Peifer in the final, 6–3, 6–0 to win the men's doubles wheelchair tennis title at the 2021 French Open. It was their second step towards a Grand Slam.

== Seeds ==
1. (United Kingdom) Alfie Hewett / (United Kingdom) Gordon Reid (champions)
2. (France) Stéphane Houdet / (France) Nicolas Peifer (final)

== Draw ==
Key

- Q = Qualifier
- WC = Wild card
- LL = Lucky loser
- Alt = Alternate
- ITF = ITF entry
- PR = Protected ranking
- SR = Special ranking
- SE = Special exempt
- JE = Junior exempt
- JR = Junior Accelerator Programme entrant
- CO = College Accelerator Programme entrant
- NG = Next Gen Accelerator Program entrant
- w/o = Walkover
- r = Retired
- d = Defaulted

=== Finals ===
Semifinals
1	(United Kingdom) Alfie Hewett (United Kingdom) Gordon Reid	2	6	[10]
(Argentina) Gustavo Fernández (Japan) Shingo Kunieda	6	2	[8]
(France) Frédéric Cattanéo (Belgium) Joachim Gérard	1	4
2	(France) Stéphane Houdet (France) Nicolas Peifer	6	6

Final
1	(United Kingdom) Alfie Hewett (United Kingdom) Gordon Reid	6	6
2	(France) Stéphane Houdet (France) Nicolas Peifer	3	0
