= 2013 US Open – Wheelchair men's doubles =

Wheelchair men's doubles
- 2013 US Open

Final
- Champion: (France) Michaël Jérémiasz (Netherlands) Maikel Scheffers
- Runner-up: (Argentina) Gustavo Fernández (Belgium) Joachim Gérard
- Score: 6–0, 4–6, 6–3

Events
Singles	men	women		boys	girls
Doubles	men	women	mixed	boys	girls
WC Singles	men	women	quad
WC Doubles	men	women	quad
Legends	men	women	mixed
← 2011 ·	US Open	· 2014 →

Michaël Jérémiasz and Maikel Scheffers defeated Gustavo Fernández and Joachim Gérard in the final, 6–0, 4–6, 6–3 to win the men's doubles wheelchair tennis title at the 2013 US Open.

Stéphane Houdet and Nicolas Peifer were the reigning champions from when the event was last held in 2011, but Peifer did not participate. Houdet partnered Shingo Kunieda, but was defeated by Jérémiasz and Scheffers in the semifinals.

There was no edition of the event in 2012, due to a scheduling conflict with the 2012 Summer Paralympics.

== Seeds ==
1. (France) Stéphane Houdet / (Japan) Shingo Kunieda (semifinals)
2. (United Kingdom) Gordon Reid / (Netherlands) Ronald Vink (semifinals)

== Doubles ==
=== Key ===
- Q = Qualifier
- WC = Wild card
- LL = Lucky loser
- Alt = Alternate
- ITF = ITF entry
- PR = Protected ranking
- SR = Special ranking
- SE = Special exempt
- JE = Junior exempt
- JR = Junior Accelerator Programme entrant
- CO = College Accelerator Programme entrant
- NG = Next Gen Accelerator Program entrant
- w/o = Walkover
- r = Retired
- d = Defaulted

=== Finals ===
Semifinals
1	(France) Stéphane Houdet (Japan) Shingo Kunieda	6	0	4
(France) Michaël Jérémiasz (Netherlands) Maikel Scheffers	2	6	6
(Argentina) Gustavo Fernández (Belgium) Joachim Gérard	7^{7}	6^{5}	7
2	(United Kingdom) Gordon Reid (Netherlands) Ronald Vink	6^{5}	7^{7}	5

Finals
(France) Michaël Jérémiasz (Netherlands) Maikel Scheffers	6	4	6
(Argentina) Gustavo Fernández (Belgium) Joachim Gérard	0	6	3
