= 2021 French Open – Wheelchair men's singles =

Wheelchair men's singles
- 2021 French Open

Final
- Champion: (United Kingdom) Alfie Hewett
- Runner-up: (Japan) Shingo Kunieda
- Score: 6–3, 6–4

Events
Singles	men	women		boys	girls
Doubles	men	women	mixed	boys	girls
WC Singles	men	women	quad
WC Doubles	men	women	quad
Legends	−45	45+	women
- French Open

Defending champion Alfie Hewett defeated Shingo Kunieda in the final, 6–3, 6–4 to win the men's singles wheelchair tennis title at the 2021 French Open. It was his third French Open singles title and fifth major singles title overall.

== Seeds ==
1. (Japan) Shingo Kunieda (final)
2. (Argentina) Gustavo Fernández (semifinals)

== Draw ==
Key

- Q = Qualifier
- WC = Wild card
- LL = Lucky loser
- Alt = Alternate
- ITF = ITF entry
- PR = Protected ranking
- SR = Special ranking
- SE = Special exempt
- JE = Junior exempt
- JR = Junior Accelerator Programme entrant
- CO = College Accelerator Programme entrant
- NG = Next Gen Accelerator Program entrant
- w/o = Walkover
- r = Retired
- d = Defaulted

=== Finals ===
Quarterfinals
1	(Japan) Shingo Kunieda	7^{7}	6
(United Kingdom) Gordon Reid	6^{3}	2
WC	(France) Frédéric Cattanéo	2	1
(France) Stéphane Houdet	6	6
(Belgium) Joachim Gérard	1	4
(United Kingdom) Alfie Hewett	6	6
(France) Nicolas Peifer	0	4
2	(Argentina) Gustavo Fernández	6	6

Semifinals
1	(Japan) Shingo Kunieda	5	6	6
(France) Stéphane Houdet	7	0	4
(United Kingdom) Alfie Hewett	1	7	7^{8}
2	(Argentina) Gustavo Fernández	6	5	6^{6}

Final
1	(Japan) Shingo Kunieda	3	4
(United Kingdom) Alfie Hewett	6	6
