= 2021 French Open – Wheelchair women's singles =

Wheelchair women's singles
- 2021 French Open

Final
- Champion: (Netherlands) Diede de Groot
- Runner-up: (Japan) Yui Kamiji
- Score: 6–4, 6–3

Events
Singles	men	women		boys	girls
Doubles	men	women	mixed	boys	girls
WC Singles	men	women	quad
WC Doubles	men	women	quad
Legends	−45	45+	women
- French Open

Diede de Groot defeated the defending champion Yui Kamiji in the final, 6–4, 6–3 to win the women's singles wheelchair tennis title at the 2021 French Open. It was the second step in an eventual Super Slam for de Groot, and she completed the double career Grand Slam with the win.

== Seeds ==
1. (Netherlands) Diede de Groot (champion)
2. (Japan) Yui Kamiji (final)

== Draw ==
Key

- Q = Qualifier
- WC = Wild card
- LL = Lucky loser
- Alt = Alternate
- ITF = ITF entry
- PR = Protected ranking
- SR = Special ranking
- SE = Special exempt
- JE = Junior exempt
- JR = Junior Accelerator Programme entrant
- CO = College Accelerator Programme entrant
- NG = Next Gen Accelerator Program entrant
- w/o = Walkover
- r = Retired
- d = Defaulted

=== Finals ===
Quarterfinals
1	(Netherlands) Diede de Groot	6	6
(Colombia) Angélica Bernal	0	0
(Netherlands) Aniek van Koot	6	6
WC	(France) Emmanuelle Mörch	1	2
(United States) Dana Mathewson	3	4
(South Africa) Kgothatso Montjane	6	6
(United Kingdom) Jordanne Whiley	2	1
2	(Japan) Yui Kamiji	6	6

Semifinals
1	(Netherlands) Diede de Groot	6	6
(Netherlands) Aniek van Koot	1	1
(South Africa) Kgothatso Montjane	0	4
2	(Japan) Yui Kamiji	6	6

Final
1	(Netherlands) Diede de Groot	6	6
2	(Japan) Yui Kamiji	4	3
