= 2011 US Open – Wheelchair men's doubles =

Wheelchair men's doubles
- 2011 US Open

Final
- Champion: (France) Stéphane Houdet (France) Nicolas Peifer
- Runner-up: (Netherlands) Maikel Scheffers (Netherlands) Ronald Vink
- Score: 6–3, 6–1

Events
Singles	men	women		boys	girls
Doubles	men	women	mixed	boys	girls
WC Singles	men	women	quad
WC Doubles	men	women	quad
Legends	men	women	mixed
← 2010 ·	US Open	· 2013 →

Stéphane Houdet and Nicolas Peifer defeated the defending champions Maikel Scheffers and Ronald Vink in the final, 6–3, 6–1 to win the men's doubles wheelchair tennis title at the 2011 US Open.

== Seeds ==
1. (Netherlands) Maikel Scheffers / (Netherlands) Ronald Vink (final)
2. (France) Stéphane Houdet / (France) Nicolas Peifer (champions)

== Doubles ==
=== Key ===
- Q = Qualifier
- WC = Wild card
- LL = Lucky loser
- Alt = Alternate
- ITF = ITF entry
- PR = Protected ranking
- SR = Special ranking
- SE = Special exempt
- JE = Junior exempt
- JR = Junior Accelerator Programme entrant
- CO = College Accelerator Programme entrant
- NG = Next Gen Accelerator Program entrant
- w/o = Walkover
- r = Retired
- d = Defaulted

=== Finals ===
Semifinals
1	(Netherlands) Maikel Scheffers (Netherlands) Ronald Vink	6	1	6
(Japan) Shingo Kunieda (United States) Stephen Welch	4	6	2
(Netherlands) Robin Ammerlaan (Sweden) Stefan Olsson	3	3
2	(France) Stéphane Houdet (France) Nicolas Peifer	6	6

Finals
1	(Netherlands) Maikel Scheffers (Netherlands) Ronald Vink	3	1
2	(France) Stéphane Houdet (France) Nicolas Peifer	6	6
