= 2011 US Open – Wheelchair quad singles =

Wheelchair quad singles
- 2011 US Open

Final
- Champion: (United States) David Wagner
- Runner-up: (United Kingdom) Peter Norfolk
- Score: 7–5, 3–1 retired

Events
Singles	men	women		boys	girls
Doubles	men	women	mixed	boys	girls
WC Singles	men	women	quad
WC Doubles	men	women	quad
Legends	men	women	mixed
- US Open

Defending champion David Wagner won the quad singles wheelchair tennis title at the 2011 US Open when Peter Norfolk retired from the final, with the score at 7–5, 3–1.

== Draw ==
Key

- Q = Qualifier
- WC = Wild card
- LL = Lucky loser
- Alt = Alternate
- ITF = ITF entry
- PR = Protected ranking
- SR = Special ranking
- SE = Special exempt
- JE = Junior exempt
- JR = Junior Accelerator Programme entrant
- CO = College Accelerator Programme entrant
- NG = Next Gen Accelerator Program entrant
- w/o = Walkover
- r = Retired
- d = Defaulted

=== Final ===
Final
1	(United States) David Wagner	7	3
2	(United Kingdom) Peter Norfolk	5	1	r

=== Round robin ===
		(United States) Wagner	(Israel) Gershony	(United States) Taylor	(United Kingdom) Norfolk	RR W–L	Set W–L	Game W–L	Standings
1	(United States) David Wagner		3–6, 1–6	6–0, 6–2	6–4, 6–2	2–1	4–2	28–20	1
	(Israel) Noam Gershony	6–3, 6–1		7–5, 4–6, 6–7^{(3–7)}	5–7, 2–6	1–2	3–4	36–35	3
	(United States) Nick Taylor	0–6, 2–6	5–7, 6–4, 7–6^{(7–3)}		2–6, 5–7	1–2	2–5	27–42	4
2	(United Kingdom) Peter Norfolk	4–6, 2–6	7–5, 6–2	6–2, 7–5		2–1	4–2	32–26	2

Standings are determined by: 1. number of wins; 2. number of matches; 3. in two-players-ties, head-to-head records; 4. in three-players-ties, percentage of sets won, or of games won; 5. steering-committee decision.
