= Annick Sevenans =

Belgian wheelchair tennis player

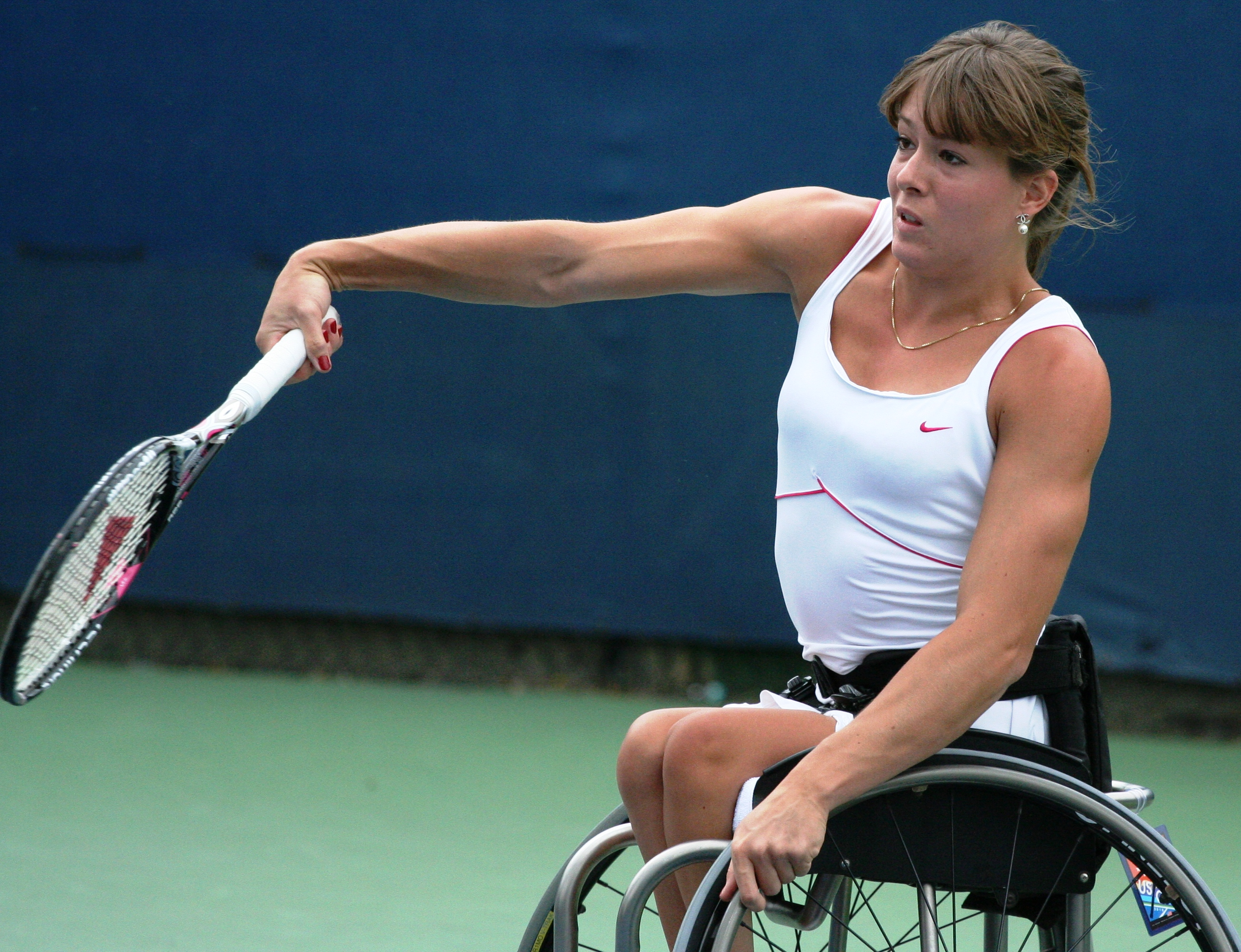
- Sevenan at the 2010 US Open
- Country (sports): Belgium
- Born: 10 December 1986 (age 39) Athens, Greece
- Turned pro: 2001
- Retired: 2013
- Plays: Right-handed (one-handed backhand)

Singles
- Highest ranking: No. 5 (25 April 2011)

Grand Slam singles results
- Australian Open: QF (2010, 2011, 2012)
- French Open: QF (2009, 2011, 2012)
- US Open: SF (2011)

Other tournaments
- Paralympic Games: 2R (2012)

Doubles
- Highest ranking: No. 6 (1 August 2011)

Grand Slam doubles results
- Australian Open: SF (2010, 2011, 2012)
- French Open: F (2009)
- Wimbledon: SF (2010, 2011, 2012)
- US Open: SF (2010, 2011)

Annick Sevenans (born 10 December 1986 in Athens) is a retired Belgian wheelchair tennis player who competed in international level events. She was a runner-up at the 2009 French Open where she partnered with Aniek Van Koot and lost to Korie Homan and Esther Vergeer.
