= Marko Osmakcic =

Swiss tennis player

- Full name: Marko Osmakcic
- Country (sports): Switzerland
- Residence: Rafz, Switzerland
- Born: 10 August 1998 (age 27) Winterthur, Switzerland
- Height: 1.93 m (6 ft 4 in)
- Plays: Right-handed (two handed-backhand)
- Prize money: $7,197

Singles
- Highest ranking: No. 1,027 (20 October 2014)

Grand Slam singles results
- Australian Open Junior: 3R (2015)
- French Open Junior: Q2 (2015)
- Wimbledon Junior: 1R (2015)
- US Open Junior: 1R (2015)

Doubles
- Career record: 0–0
- Highest ranking: No. 1,567 (27 August 2018)

Grand Slam doubles results
- Australian Open Junior: 1R (2015)
- French Open Junior: 1R (2015)
- Wimbledon Junior: 2R (2015)
- US Open Junior: 2R (2015)

Marko Osmakcic (Serbo-Croatian: Osmakčić; born 10 August 1998) is a retired Swiss tennis player. Marko has a career high junior ranking of 41. He made the third round of the 2015 Australian Open boys singles. In 2015 Osmakcic was invited to the Switzerland Davis Cup team. In 2020, he participated in the Swiss version of The Bachelorette, where he finished in third place. Later, he also participated in Serbian reality show Zadruga 5, which he left self willingly after 9 months, before it finished.
