= 2011 US Open – Wheelchair men's singles =

Wheelchair men's singles
- 2011 US Open

Final
- Champion: (Japan) Shingo Kunieda
- Runner-up: (France) Stéphane Houdet
- Score: 3–6, 6–1, 6–0

Events
Singles	men	women		boys	girls
Doubles	men	women	mixed	boys	girls
WC Singles	men	women	quad
WC Doubles	men	women	quad
Legends	men	women	mixed
← 2010 ·	US Open	· 2013 →

Three-time defending champion Shingo Kunieda defeated Stéphane Houdet in the final, 3–6, 6–1, 6–0 to win the men's singles wheelchair tennis title at the 2011 US Open. It was his fourth US Open singles title and 13th major singles title overall.

== Seeds ==
1. (Japan) Shingo Kunieda (champion)
2. (Netherlands) Maikel Scheffers (semifinals)

== Draw ==
=== Key ===
- Q = Qualifier
- WC = Wild card
- LL = Lucky loser
- Alt = Alternate
- ITF = ITF entry
- PR = Protected ranking
- SR = Special ranking
- SE = Special exempt
- JE = Junior exempt
- JR = Junior Accelerator Programme entrant
- CO = College Accelerator Programme entrant
- NG = Next Gen Accelerator Program entrant
- w/o = Walkover
- r = Retired
- d = Defaulted

=== Finals ===
Quarterfinals
1	(Japan) Shingo Kunieda	6	6
(France) Nicolas Peifer	2	1
(Sweden) Stefan Olsson	5	4
(Netherlands) Ronald Vink	7	6
(France) Stéphane Houdet	6	6
WC	(United States) Stephen Welch	1	1
(Netherlands) Robin Ammerlaan	5	6	2
2	(Netherlands) Maikel Scheffers	7	3	6

Semifinals
1	(Japan) Shingo Kunieda	6	6
(Netherlands) Ronald Vink	2	0
(France) Stéphane Houdet	6	6
2	(Netherlands) Maikel Scheffers	4	0

Finals
1	(Japan) Shingo Kunieda	3	6	6
(France) Stéphane Houdet	6	1	0

Preceded by 2010 US Open – Wheelchair men's singles	Grand Slams	Succeeded by 2013 US Open – Wheelchair men's singles
