= 2013 US Open – Wheelchair women's singles =

Wheelchair women's singles
- 2013 US Open

Final
- Champion: (Netherlands) Aniek van Koot
- Runner-up: (Germany) Sabine Ellerbrock
- Score: 3–6, 6–2, 7–6^{(7–3)}

Events
Singles	men	women		boys	girls
Doubles	men	women	mixed	boys	girls
WC Singles	men	women	quad
WC Doubles	men	women	quad
Legends	men	women	mixed
← 2011 ·	US Open	· 2014 →

Aniek van Koot defeated Sabine Ellerbrock in the final, 3–6, 6–2, 7–6 ^{(7–3)} to win the women's singles wheelchair tennis title at the 2013 US Open.

Esther Vergeer was the six-time reigning champion from when the event was last held in 2011, not being held in 2012 due to a schedule conflict with the 2012 Summer Paralympics. However, Vergeer retired from professional wheelchair tennis in February 2013. Since Vergeer had won every edition of the event since its creation in 2005, a new US Open singles champion was guaranteed.

== Seeds ==
1. (Germany) Sabine Ellerbrock (final)
2. (Netherlands) Aniek van Koot (champion)

== Draw ==
=== Key ===
- Q = Qualifier
- WC = Wild card
- LL = Lucky loser
- Alt = Alternate
- ITF = ITF entry
- PR = Protected ranking
- SR = Special ranking
- SE = Special exempt
- JE = Junior exempt
- JR = Junior Accelerator Programme entrant
- CO = College Accelerator Programme entrant
- NG = Next Gen Accelerator Program entrant
- w/o = Walkover
- r = Retired
- d = Defaulted

=== Finals ===
Quarterfinals
1	(Germany) Sabine Ellerbrock	6	6
(United Kingdom) Jordanne Whiley	2	4
(United Kingdom) Lucy Shuker	5	4
(Netherlands) Marjolein Buis	7	6
(Japan) Yui Kamiji	6	6
(South Africa) Kgothatso Montjane	3	3
(Netherlands) Jiske Griffioen	2	2
2	(Netherlands) Aniek van Koot	6	6

Semifinals
1	(Germany) Sabine Ellerbrock	7	6
(Netherlands) Marjolein Buis	5	1
(Japan) Yui Kamiji	7	5	2
2	(Netherlands) Aniek van Koot	5	7	6

Finals
1	(Germany) Sabine Ellerbrock	6	2	6^{3}
2	(Netherlands) Aniek van Koot	3	6	7^{7}
