= 2011 US Open – Wheelchair women's singles =

Wheelchair women's singles
- 2011 US Open

Final
- Champion: (Netherlands) Esther Vergeer
- Runner-up: (Netherlands) Aniek van Koot
- Score: 6–2, 6–1

Events
Singles	men	women		boys	girls
Doubles	men	women	mixed	boys	girls
WC Singles	men	women	quad
WC Doubles	men	women	quad
Legends	men	women	mixed
← 2010 ·	US Open	· 2013 →

Five-time defending champion Esther Vergeer defeated Aniek van Koot in the final, 6–2, 6–1 to win the women's singles wheelchair tennis title at the 2011 US Open.

== Seeds ==
1. (Netherlands) Esther Vergeer (champion)
2. (Netherlands) Jiske Griffioen (semifinals)

== Draw ==
=== Key ===
- Q = Qualifier
- WC = Wild card
- LL = Lucky loser
- Alt = Alternate
- ITF = ITF entry
- PR = Protected ranking
- SR = Special ranking
- SE = Special exempt
- JE = Junior exempt
- JR = Junior Accelerator Programme entrant
- CO = College Accelerator Programme entrant
- NG = Next Gen Accelerator Program entrant
- w/o = Walkover
- r = Retired
- d = Defaulted

=== Finals ===
Quarterfinals
1	(Netherlands) Esther Vergeer	6	6
(Netherlands) Marjolein Buis	1	0
(Australia) Daniela di Toro	3	3
(Belgium) Annick Sevenans	6	6
(Netherlands) Aniek van Koot	7	6
(Netherlands) Sharon Walraven	5	1
WC	(United States) Emmy Kaiser	2	2
2	(Netherlands) Jiske Griffioen	6	6

Semifinals
1	(Netherlands) Esther Vergeer	6	6
(Belgium) Annick Sevenans	2	3
(Netherlands) Aniek van Koot	6	6
2	(Netherlands) Jiske Griffioen	3	2

Finals
1	(Netherlands) Esther Vergeer	6	6
(Netherlands) Aniek van Koot	2	1
