= 2010 US Open – Wheelchair men's doubles =

Wheelchair men's doubles
- 2010 US Open

Final
- Champion: (Netherlands) Maikel Scheffers (Netherlands) Ronald Vink
- Runner-up: (France) Nicolas Peifer (United States) Jon Rydberg
- Score: 6–0, 6–0

Events
Singles	men	women		boys	girls
Doubles	men	women	mixed	boys	girls
WC Singles	men	women	quad
WC Doubles	men	women	quad
Legends	men	women	mixed
← 2009 ·	US Open	· 2011 →

Maikel Scheffers and Ronald Vink defeated Nicolas Peifer and Jon Rydberg in the final, 6–0, 6–0 to win the men's doubles wheelchair tennis title at the 2010 US Open.

Stéphane Houdet and Stefan Olsson were the defending champions, but were defeated by Scheffers and Vink in the semifinals.

== Seeds ==
1. (Netherlands) Robin Ammerlaan / (Japan) Shingo Kunieda (first round, withdrew)
2. (France) Stéphane Houdet / (Sweden) Stefan Olsson (first round)

== Doubles ==
=== Key ===
- Q = Qualifier
- WC = Wild card
- LL = Lucky loser
- Alt = Alternate
- ITF = ITF entry
- PR = Protected ranking
- SR = Special ranking
- SE = Special exempt
- JE = Junior exempt
- JR = Junior Accelerator Programme entrant
- CO = College Accelerator Programme entrant
- NG = Next Gen Accelerator Program entrant
- w/o = Walkover
- r = Retired
- d = Defaulted

=== Finals ===
Semifinals
1	(Netherlands) Robin Ammerlaan (Japan) Shingo Kunieda
(France) Nicolas Peifer (United States) Jon Rydberg	w/o
(Netherlands) Maikel Scheffers (Netherlands) Ronald Vink	6	6
2	(France) Stéphane Houdet (Sweden) Stefan Olsson	2	1

Finals
(France) Nicolas Peifer (United States) Jon Rydberg	0	0
(Netherlands) Maikel Scheffers (Netherlands) Ronald Vink	6	6
