= 2009 Australian Open – Wheelchair men's singles =

Wheelchair men's singles
- 2009 Australian Open

Final
- Champion: (Japan) Shingo Kunieda
- Runner-up: (France) Stéphane Houdet
- Score: 6–2, 6–4

Events
Singles	men	women		boys	girls
Doubles	men	women	mixed	boys	girls
WC Singles	men	women	quad
WC Doubles	men	women	quad
Legends	men	women	mixed
- Australian Open

Two-time defending champion Shingo Kunieda defeated Stéphane Houdet in the final, 6–2, 6–4 to win the men's singles wheelchair tennis title at the 2009 Australian Open. It was his third Australian Open singles title and sixth major singles title overall.

== Seeds ==
1. (Japan) Shingo Kunieda (champion)
2. (Netherlands) Robin Ammerlaan (first round)

== Draw ==
Key

- Q = Qualifier
- WC = Wild card
- LL = Lucky loser
- Alt = Alternate
- ITF = ITF entry
- PR = Protected ranking
- SR = Special ranking
- SE = Special exempt
- JE = Junior exempt
- JR = Junior Accelerator Programme entrant
- CO = College Accelerator Programme entrant
- NG = Next Gen Accelerator Program entrant
- w/o = Walkover
- r = Retired
- d = Defaulted

=== Finals ===
Quarterfinals
1	(Japan) Shingo Kunieda	6	6
(Austria) Martin Legner	3	3
(France) Michaël Jérémiasz	6	6
(Sweden) Stefan Olsson	4	2
(Netherlands) Maikel Scheffers	6	6
(Australia) Ben Weekes	1	1
(France) Stéphane Houdet	6	4
2	(Netherlands) Robin Ammerlaan	4	1^{r}

Semifinals
1	(Japan) Shingo Kunieda	3	6	6
(France) Michaël Jérémiasz	6	2	4
(Netherlands) Maikel Scheffers	0	2
(France) Stéphane Houdet	6	6

Final
1	(Japan) Shingo Kunieda	6	6
(France) Stéphane Houdet	2	4
