= 2021 French Open – Girls' doubles =

Girls' doubles
- 2021 French Open

Final
- Champions: (Philippines) Alex Eala (Russia) Oksana Selekhmeteva
- Runners-up: (Russia) Maria Bondarenko (Hungary) Amarissa Tóth
- Score: 6–0, 7–5

Events
Singles	men	women		boys	girls
Doubles	men	women	mixed	boys	girls
WC Singles	men	women	quad
WC Doubles	men	women	quad
Legends	−45	45+	women
- French Open

Eleonora Alvisi and Lisa Pigato were the defending champions, but they lost in the semifinals to Alex Eala and Oksana Selekhmeteva.

Eala and Selekhmeteva went on to win the title, defeating Maria Bondarenko and Amarissa Tóth in the final, 6–0, 7–5.

== Seeds ==
1. (Philippines) Alex Eala / (Russia) Oksana Selekhmeteva (champions)
2. (Czech Republic) Linda Fruhvirtová / (Russia) Polina Kudermetova (quarterfinals)
3. (Andorra) Victoria Jiménez Kasintseva / (Czech Republic) Linda Nosková (semifinals)
4. (United Kingdom) Matilda Mutavdzic / (Russia) Diana Shnaider (second round)
5. (Croatia) Petra Marčinko / (Hungary) Natália Szabanin (quarterfinals)
6. (Belarus) Kristina Dmitruk / (Czech Republic) Darja Viďmanová (first round)
7. (France) Océane Babel / (Argentina) Solana Sierra (first round)
8. (Russia) Maria Bondarenko / (Hungary) Amarissa Tóth (final)

== Draw ==
Key

- Q = Qualifier
- WC = Wild card
- LL = Lucky loser
- Alt = Alternate
- ITF = ITF entry
- PR = Protected ranking
- SR = Special ranking
- SE = Special exempt
- JE = Junior exempt
- JR = Junior Accelerator Programme entrant
- CO = College Accelerator Programme entrant
- NG = Next Gen Accelerator Program entrant
- w/o = Walkover
- r = Retired
- d = Defaulted

=== Finals ===
Semifinals
1	(Philippines) Alex Eala (Russia) Oksana Selekhmeteva	6	6
(Italy) Eleonora Alvisi (Italy) Lisa Pigato	2	1
3	(Andorra) Victoria Jiménez Kasintseva (Czech Republic) Linda Nosková	7^{7}	2	[4]
8	(Russia) Maria Bondarenko (Hungary) Amarissa Tóth	6^{2}	6	[10]

Final
1	(Philippines) Alex Eala (Russia) Oksana Selekhmeteva	6	7
8	(Russia) Maria Bondarenko (Hungary) Amarissa Tóth	0	5

=== Top half ===
First round
1	(Philippines) Alex Eala (Russia) Oksana Selekhmeteva	6	6
(Belarus) Evialina Laskevich (Russia) Alina Shcherbinina	4	4
(Russia) Ekaterina Maklakova (Russia) Maria Sholokhova	5	3
(Belgium) Sofia Costoulas (Finland) Laura Hietaranta	7	6
WC	(United States) Qavia Lopez (France) Mathilde Ngijol-Carré	6	2	[8]
(Czech Republic) Barbora Palicová (Canada) Annabelle Xu	2	6	[10]
(United States) Robin Montgomery (United States) Clervie Ngounoue	6^{3}	6	[10]
5	(Croatia) Petra Marčinko (Hungary) Natália Szabanin	7^{7}	2	[12]
4	(United Kingdom) Matilda Mutavdzic (Russia) Diana Shnaider	5	6	[10]
(Peru) Dana Guzmán (Denmark) Johanne Svendsen	7	2	[6]
(Russia) Tatiana Barkova (Belarus) Aliona Falei	6	7
(Switzerland) Chelsea Fontenel (Spain) Ane Mintegi del Olmo	4	5
(Russia) Polina Iatcenko (Ukraine) Sabina Zeynalova	4	7	[10]
WC	(France) Anaëlle Leclercq (France) Lucie Nguyen Tan	6	5	[6]
(Italy) Eleonora Alvisi (Italy) Lisa Pigato	6	6
6	(Belarus) Kristina Dmitruk (Czech Republic) Darja Viďmanová	2	4

Second round
1	(Philippines) A Eala (Russia) O Selekhmeteva	6	6
(Belgium) S Costoulas (Finland) L Hietaranta	3	1
(Czech Republic) B Palicová (Canada) A Xu	3	6^{5}
5	(Croatia) P Marčinko (Hungary) N Szabanin	6	7^{7}
4	(United Kingdom) M Mutavdzic (Russia) D Shnaider	6	4	[7]
(Russia) T Barkova (Belarus) A Falei	4	6	[10]
(Russia) P Iatcenko (Ukraine) S Zeynalova	2	4
(Italy) E Alvisi (Italy) L Pigato	6	6

Quarterfinals
1	(Philippines) A Eala (Russia) O Selekhmeteva	7^{9}	7^{7}
5	(Croatia) P Marčinko (Hungary) N Szabanin	6^{7}	6^{5}
(Russia) T Barkova (Belarus) A Falei	3	0
(Italy) E Alvisi (Italy) L Pigato	6	6

Semifinals
1	(Philippines) A Eala (Russia) O Selekhmeteva	6	6
(Italy) E Alvisi (Italy) L Pigato	2	1

=== Bottom half ===
First round
7	(France) Océane Babel (Argentina) Solana Sierra	3	4
(Japan) Mei Hasegawa (United States) Valencia Xu	6	6
(United States) Ashlyn Krueger (United States) Madison Sieg	6	6
WC	(France) Nahia Berecoechea (France) Maëlie Monfils	0	2
(Russia) Erika Andreeva (Indonesia) Priska Madelyn Nugroho	4	4
(Mexico) Julia García (France) Laïa Petretic	6	6
(Germany) Nicole Rivkin (Belgium) Hanne Vandewinkel	6	1	[9]
3	(Andorra) Victoria Jiménez Kasintseva (Czech Republic) Linda Nosková	3	6	[11]
8	(Russia) Maria Bondarenko (Hungary) Amarissa Tóth	6	2	[10]
(Russia) Anastasiia Gureva (Serbia) Lola Radivojević	3	6	[8]
(United States) Elizabeth Coleman (Greece) Michaela Laki	6	6
WC	(France) Loïs Boisson (France) Sarah Iliev	4	2
(Switzerland) Sebastianna Scilipoti (Slovakia) Radka Zelníčková	6	2	[10]
(Germany) Mara Guth (Germany) Julia Middendorf	4	6	[12]
(United States) Reese Brantmeier (United States) Elvina Kalieva	6^{9}	4
2	(Czech Republic) Linda Fruhvirtová (Russia) Polina Kudermetova	7^{11}	6

Second round
(Japan) M Hasegawa (United States) V Xu	6	6^{5}	[10]
(United States) A Krueger (United States) M Sieg	1	7^{7}	[4]
(Mexico) J García (France) L Petretic	6	3	[8]
3	(Andorra) V Jiménez Kasintseva (Czech Republic) L Nosková	4	6	[10]
8	(Russia) M Bondarenko (Hungary) AK Tóth	6	6
(United States) E Coleman (Greece) M Laki	3	1
(Germany) M Guth (Germany) J Middendorf	6	2	[5]
2	(Czech Republic) L Fruhvirtová (Russia) P Kudermetova	3	6	[10]

Quarterfinals
(Japan) M Hasegawa (United States) V Xu	1	0
3	(Andorra) V Jiménez Kasintseva (Czech Republic) L Nosková	6	6
8	(Russia) M Bondarenko (Hungary) AK Tóth	5	6	[11]
2	(Czech Republic) L Fruhvirtová (Russia) P Kudermetova	7	4	[9]

Semifinals
3	(Andorra) V Jiménez Kasintseva (Czech Republic) L Nosková	7^{7}	2	[4]
8	(Russia) M Bondarenko (Hungary) A Tóth	6^{2}	6	[10]
