= 2011 US Open – Boys' singles =

Boys' singles
- 2011 US Open

Final
- Champion: (United Kingdom) Oliver Golding
- Runner-up: (Czech Republic) Jiří Veselý
- Score: 5–7, 6–3, 6–4

Events
Singles	men	women		boys	girls
Doubles	men	women	mixed	boys	girls
WC Singles	men	women	quad
WC Doubles	men	women	quad
Legends	men	women	mixed
- US Open

Jack Sock was the defending champion, but participated in the men's main draw, as he was ineligible to defend his title.

Oliver Golding claimed the title by defeating Jiří Veselý 5–7, 6–3, 6–4 in the final.

== Seeds ==
1. (Czech Republic) Jiří Veselý (final)
2. (Australia) Luke Saville (first round)
3. (United States) Bjorn Fratangelo (third round)
4. (Bolivia) Hugo Dellien (third round)
5. (Brazil) Thiago Moura Monteiro (first round)
6. (Slovakia) Filip Horanský (quarterfinals)
7. (Austria) Dominic Thiem (first round)
8. (Croatia) Mate Pavić (first round)
9. (United Kingdom) Liam Broady (third round)
10. (United Kingdom) George Morgan (semifinals)
11. (Australia) Andrew Whittington (first round)
12. (Austria) Patrick Ofner (first round)
13. (United Kingdom) Oliver Golding (champion)
14. (Brazil) João Pedro Sorgi (second round)
15. (Chile) Matías Sborowitz (second round)
16. (Philippines) Jeson Patrombon (first round)

== Main draw ==
Key

- Q = Qualifier
- WC = Wild card
- LL = Lucky loser
- Alt = Alternate
- ITF = ITF entry
- PR = Protected ranking
- SR = Special ranking
- SE = Special exempt
- JE = Junior exempt
- JR = Junior Accelerator Programme entrant
- CO = College Accelerator Programme entrant
- NG = Next Gen Accelerator Program entrant
- w/o = Walkover
- r = Retired
- d = Defaulted

=== Finals ===
Quarterfinals
1	(Czech Republic) Jiří Veselý	7	6
(United States) Alexios Halebian	5	2
(Egypt) Karim Hossam	2	4
(United Kingdom) Kyle Edmund	6	6
6	(Slovakia) Filip Horanský	7	4	1
13	(United Kingdom) Oliver Golding	5	6	6
10	(United Kingdom) George Morgan	6^{3}	6	6
(Czech Republic) Adam Pavlásek	7^{7}	4	4

Semifinals
1	(Czech Republic) Jiří Veselý	6	6
(United Kingdom) Kyle Edmund	4	2
13	(United Kingdom) Oliver Golding	6	7^{7}
10	(United Kingdom) George Morgan	0	6^{2}

Final
1	(Czech Republic) Jiří Veselý	7	3	4
13	(United Kingdom) Oliver Golding	5	6	6

=== Top half ===
==== Section 1 ====
First round
1	(Czech Republic) Jiří Veselý	6	6
(Ukraine) Vladyslav Manafov	3	1
(United States) Marcos Giron	7^{7}	6
Q	(France) Enzo Couacaud	6^{1}	4
(United States) Shane Vinsant	6	4	2
(Serbia) Nikola Milojević	3	6	6
(Mexico) Marco Aurei Núñez	6	3	6^{6}
15	(Chile) Matías Sborowitz	3	6	7^{8}
9	(United Kingdom) Liam Broady	6	6
Q	(Italy) Stefano Napolitano	1	1
WC	(United States) Gage Brymer	3	2
(Croatia) Mate Delić	6	6
(Germany) Julian Lenz	6	6
(Belarus) Yaraslau Shyla	0	2
(United States) Alexios Halebian	6	6^{4}	7
5	(Brazil) Thiago Moura Monteiro	3	7^{7}	5

Second round
1	(Czech Republic) J Veselý	6	6
(United States) M Giron	1	3
(Serbia) N Milojević	6	6
15	(Chile) M Sborowitz	2	0
9	(United Kingdom) L Broady	6	6
(Croatia) M Delić	3	1
(Germany) J Lenz	2	2
(United States) A Halebian	6	6

Third round
1	(Czech Republic) J Veselý	6	6
(Serbia) N Milojević	1	2
9	(United Kingdom) L Broady	6	4	3
(United States) A Halebian	3	6	6

Quarterfinals
1	(Czech Republic) J Veselý	7	6
(United States) A Halebian	5	2

==== Section 2 ====
First round
4	(Bolivia) Hugo Dellien	7	6
WC	(United States) Dennis Novikov	5	4
Q	(Israel) Bar Botzer	6	4	2
(Japan) Kaichi Uchida	4	6	6
WC	(United States) Ronnie Schneider	1	4
(Egypt) Karim Hossam	6	6
(Portugal) Frederico Ferreira Silva	3	6	7^{8}
16	(Philippines) Jeson Patrombon	6	3	6^{6}
11	(Australia) Andrew Whittington	5	2
Q	(Canada) Filip Peliwo	7	6
(United States) Sean Berman	4	6^{2}
Q	(South Korea) Kim Jae-hwan	6	7^{7}
(Belgium) Joris De Loore	1	7	1
(United Kingdom) Kyle Edmund	6	5	6
(United States) Mitchell Krueger	6	6
7	(Austria) Dominic Thiem	2	2

Second round
4	(Bolivia) H Dellien	6	5	6
(Japan) K Uchida	3	7	1
(Egypt) K Hossam	2	7^{7}	6
(Portugal) F Ferreira Silva	6	6^{2}	4
Q	(Canada) F Peliwo	6	6
Q	(South Korea) J-h Kim	3	2
(United Kingdom) K Edmund	7^{7}	2	6
(United States) M Krueger	6^{4}	6	1

Third round
4	(Bolivia) H Dellien	5	4
(Egypt) K Hossam	7	6
Q	(Canada) F Peliwo	2	6	1
(United Kingdom) K Edmund	6	3	6

Quarterfinals
(Egypt) K Hossam	2	4
(United Kingdom) K Edmund	6	6

=== Bottom half ===
==== Section 3 ====
First round
6	(Slovakia) Filip Horanský	6	1	6
(United States) Mac Styslinger	4	6	3
(Russia) Aslan Karatsev	6	3	7
(Moldova) Maxim Dubarenco	4	6	5
WC	(United States) Luca Corinteli	4	6	3
(Japan) Yoshihito Nishioka	6	3	6
(Serbia) Peđa Krstin	6	2	6
12	(Austria) Patrick Ofner	2	6	3
13	(United Kingdom) Oliver Golding	6	6
WC	(United States) Brett Clark	3	4
Q	(Germany) Constantin Christ	2	6^{5}
(Australia) Ben Wagland	6	7^{7}
(Brazil) Bruno Sant'anna	6	6
(Belgium) Kimmer Coppejans	4	4
(Chile) Benjamin Ugarte	1	3
3	(United States) Bjorn Fratangelo	6	6

Second round
6	(Slovakia) F Horanský	6	6
(Russia) A Karatsev	3	2
(Japan) Y Nishioka	4	1
(Serbia) P Krstin	6	6
13	(United Kingdom) O Golding	7	6
(Australia) B Wagland	5	3
(Brazil) B Sant'anna	3	3
3	(United States) B Frantangelo	6	6

Third round
6	(Slovakia) F Horanský	6	6
(Serbia) P Krstin	4	2
13	(United Kingdom) O Golding	7	3	6
3	(United States) B Frantangelo	5	6	3

Quarterfinals
6	(Slovakia) F Horanský	7	4	1
13	(United Kingdom) O Golding	5	6	6

==== Section 4 ====
First round
8	(Croatia) Mate Pavić	6	1	3
WC	(United States) JC Aragone	2	6	6
(South Africa) Wayne Montgomery	1	4
(Germany) Robin Kern	6	6
(Ecuador) Diego Hidalgo	4	4
(United States) Connor Farren	6	6
(Belgium) Julien Cagnina	7^{7}	4	2
10	(United Kingdom) George Morgan	6^{4}	6	6
14	(Brazil) João Pedro Sorgi	6	7^{7}
WC	(United States) Thai-Son Kwiatkowski	2	6^{3}
(Austria) Dennis Novak	6^{6}	6	3
Q	(Israel) Or Ram-Harel	7^{8}	3	6
(Chile) Gonzalo Lama	6	6
Q	(United States) Michael Redlicki	4	4
(Czech Republic) Adam Pavlásek	6	7
2	(Australia) Luke Saville	4	5

Second round
WC	(United States) J Aragone	6^{5}	3
(Germany) R Kern	7^{7}	6
(United States) C Farren	6^{3}	6^{8}
10	(United Kingdom) G Morgan	7^{7}	7^{10}
14	(Brazil) JP Sorgi	3	4
Q	(Israel) O Ram-Harel	6	6
(Chile) G Lama	0	0
(Czech Republic) A Pavlásek	6	6

Third round
(Germany) R Kern	2	2
10	(United Kingdom) G Morgan	6	6
Q	(Israel) O Ram-Harel	7^{7}	3	2
(Czech Republic) A Pavlásek	6^{3}	6	6

Quarterfinals
10	(United Kingdom) G Morgan	6^{3}	6	6
(Czech Republic) A Pavlásek	7^{7}	4	4
