= 2021 French Open – Mixed doubles =

Tennis tournament

Mixed doubles
- 2021 French Open

Final
- Champions: (United States) Desirae Krawczyk (United Kingdom) Joe Salisbury
- Runners-up: (Russia) Elena Vesnina (Russia) Aslan Karatsev
- Score: 2–6, 6–4, [10–5]

Details
- Draw: 16
- Seeds: 4

Events
Singles	men	women		boys	girls
Doubles	men	women	mixed	boys	girls
WC Singles	men	women	quad
WC Doubles	men	women	quad
Legends	−45	45+	women
- French Open

Desirae Krawczyk and Joe Salisbury defeated Elena Vesnina and Aslan Karatsev in the final, 2–6, 6–4, [10–5] to win the mixed doubles title at the 2021 French Open. It was Krawczyk's first major title, and was Salisbury's first major title in mixed doubles. Additionally, this was Vesnina's first major final since returning from pregnancy, and Karatsev's first major final in any discipline. Vesnina and Karatsev were the first Russian team to reach the French Open mixed doubles final.

Latisha Chan and Ivan Dodig were the two-time defending champions, but lost in the first round to Demi Schuurs and Wesley Koolhof.

This was the first edition of this event since 2019, as the 2020 edition was cancelled due to the COVID-19 pandemic. The tournament featured only 16 teams, instead of the usual 32 teams.

== Seeds ==
1. (Czech Republic) Barbora Krejčíková / (Slovakia) Filip Polášek (quarterfinals)
2. (United States) Nicole Melichar / (United States) Rajeev Ram (quarterfinals)
3. (Netherlands) Demi Schuurs / (Netherlands) Wesley Koolhof (semifinals)
4. (China) Xu Yifan / (Brazil) Bruno Soares (first round)

== Draw ==
Key

- Q = Qualifier
- WC = Wild card
- LL = Lucky loser
- Alt = Alternate
- ITF = ITF entry
- PR = Protected ranking
- SR = Special ranking
- SE = Special exempt
- JE = Junior exempt
- JR = Junior Accelerator Programme entrant
- CO = College Accelerator Programme entrant
- NG = Next Gen Accelerator Program entrant
- w/o = Walkover
- r = Retired
- d = Defaulted

=== Draw ===
First round
1	(Czech Republic) B Krejčíková (Slovakia) F Polášek	6	6
WC	(France) A Cornet (France) É Roger-Vasselin	2	2
(United States) B Mattek-Sands (United Kingdom) J Murray	6^{4}	7^{7}	[6]
(Mexico) G Olmos (Colombia) JS Cabal	7^{7}	6^{3}	[10]
4	(China) Y Xu (Brazil) B Soares	4	3
(United States) D Krawczyk (United Kingdom) J Salisbury	6	6
(Croatia) D Jurak (Colombia) R Farah	1	6	[10]
Alt	(Germany) L Siegemund (Belgium) S Gillé	6	4	[8]
(Chile) A Guarachi (United Kingdom) N Skupski	6	1	[10]
(Chinese Taipei) H-c Chan (Australia) J Peers	4	6	[5]
(Chinese Taipei) L Chan (Croatia) I Dodig	3	1
3	(Netherlands) D Schuurs (Netherlands) W Koolhof	6	6
PR	(Russia) E Vesnina (Russia) A Karatsev	6	6
(Canada) G Dabrowski (Australia) L Saville	4	2
WC	(France) C Garcia (France) N Mahut	6^{4}	4
2	(United States) N Melichar (United States) R Ram	7^{7}	6

Quarterfinals
1	(Czech Republic) B Krejčíková (Slovakia) F Polášek	2	7	[10]
(Mexico) G Olmos (Colombia) JS Cabal	6	5	[12]
(United States) D Krawczyk (United Kingdom) J Salisbury	6	7^{7}
(Croatia) D Jurak (Colombia) R Farah	2	6^{3}
(Chile) A Guarachi (United Kingdom) N Skupski	6	3	[5]
3	(Netherlands) D Schuurs (Netherlands) W Koolhof	4	6	[10]
PR	(Russia) E Vesnina (Russia) A Karatsev	6^{3}	6	[10]
2	(United States) N Melichar (United States) R Ram	7^{7}	2	[8]

Semifinals
(Mexico) G Olmos (Colombia) JS Cabal
(United States) D Krawczyk (United Kingdom) J Salisbury	w/o
3	(Netherlands) D Schuurs (Netherlands) W Koolhof	4	1
PR	(Russia) E Vesnina (Russia) A Karatsev	6	6

Final
(United States) D Krawczyk (United Kingdom) J Salisbury	2	6	[10]
PR	(Russia) E Vesnina (Russia) A Karatsev	6	4	[5]

== Other entry information ==
=== Wild cards ===
- (France) Alizé Cornet / (France) Édouard Roger-Vasselin
- (France) Caroline Garcia / (France) Nicolas Mahut

=== Protected ranking ===
- (Russia) Elena Vesnina / (Russia) Aslan Karatsev

=== Alternate pair ===
- (Germany) Laura Siegemund / (Belgium) Sander Gillé

=== Withdrawals ===
Before the tournament

- (Canada) Gabriela Dabrowski / (Croatia) Mate Pavić → replaced by (Canada) Gabriela Dabrowski / (Australia) Luke Saville
- (United States) CoCo Vandeweghe / (Austria) Jürgen Melzer → replaced by (Germany) Laura Siegemund / (Belgium) Sander Gillé
