= Matías Sborowitz =

Chilean tennis player

- Country (sports): Chile
- Born: 9 July 1993 (age 32) Santiago, Chile
- Height: 1.75 m (5 ft 9 in)
- Turned pro: 2008
- Retired: 2014
- Plays: Right-handed
- College: Pepperdine University
- Prize money: $25,396

Singles
- Career record: 0–0 (at ATP Tour level, Grand Slam level, and in Davis Cup)
- Career titles: 2 ITF
- Highest ranking: No. 456 (5 January 2015)

Grand Slam singles results
- French Open Junior: 1R (2011)
- Wimbledon Junior: 1R (2011)
- US Open Junior: 2R (2011)

Doubles
- Career record: 0–1 (at ATP Tour level, Grand Slam level, and in Davis Cup)
- Career titles: 0 ITF
- Highest ranking: No. 1528 (21 September 2015)

Grand Slam doubles results
- French Open Junior: 1R (2011)
- Wimbledon Junior: 1R (2011)
- US Open Junior: 1R (2011)
- Last updated on: 10 March 2023.

Matías Sborowitz (born 9 July 1993) is a Chilean former tennis player.

As a junior, he achieved a career high ranking of 25. Sborowitz played college tennis at Pepperdine University. Sborowitz made his ATP main draw debut at the 2012 VTR Open in the doubles draw, partnering Gonzalo Lama, losing in the first round. It would be the only ATP match of his career.

Sborowitz had a career high ATP singles ranking of 456, and a career high ATP doubles ranking of 1528, achieved on 21 September 2015. He retired in 2014.
