= 2021 French Open – Girls' singles =

Girls' singles
- 2021 French Open

Final
- Champion: (Czech Republic) Linda Nosková
- Runner-up: (Russia) Erika Andreeva
- Score: 7–6^{(7–3)}, 6–3

Events
Singles	men	women		boys	girls
Doubles	men	women	mixed	boys	girls
WC Singles	men	women	quad
WC Doubles	men	women	quad
Legends	−45	45+	women
← 2020 ·	French Open	· 2022 →

Linda Nosková won the title, defeating Erika Andreeva in the final, 7–6^{(7–3)}, 6–3.

Elsa Jacquemot was the defending champion, but received a wildcard into the women's singles event, losing to 21st seed Elena Rybakina in the first round.

== Seeds ==
1. (Andorra) Victoria Jiménez Kasintseva (quarterfinals)
2. (Philippines) Alex Eala (first round)
3. (Russia) Polina Kudermetova (quarterfinals)
4. (Russia) Diana Shnaider (semifinals)
5. (United States) Robin Montgomery (quarterfinals)
6. (France) Océane Babel (third round)
7. (Belarus) Kristina Dmitruk (third round)
8. (Hungary) Natália Szabanin (second round)

9. (Russia) Oksana Selekhmeteva (semifinals)
10. (Russia) Maria Bondarenko (second round)
11. (Czech Republic) Linda Fruhvirtová (second round)
12. (Belgium) Sofia Costoulas (second round)
13. (United States) Madison Sieg (third round)
14. (United States) Elvina Kalieva (first round)
15. (Indonesia) Priska Madelyn Nugroho (first round)
16. (Peru) Dana Guzmán (first round)

Click on the seed number of a player to go to their draw section.

== Draw ==
=== Key ===
- Q = Qualifier
- WC = Wild card
- LL = Lucky loser
- Alt = Alternate
- ITF = ITF entry
- PR = Protected ranking
- SR = Special ranking
- SE = Special exempt
- JE = Junior exempt
- JR = Junior Accelerator Programme entrant
- CO = College Accelerator Programme entrant
- NG = Next Gen Accelerator Program entrant
- w/o = Walkover
- r = Retired
- d = Defaulted

=== Finals ===
Quarterfinals
1	(Andorra) Victoria Jiménez Kasintseva	5	6	3
(Czech Republic) Linda Nosková	7	2	6
4	(Russia) Diana Shnaider	6	6
5	(United States) Robin Montgomery	3	1
(Russia) Erika Andreeva	6	1	6
3	(Russia) Polina Kudermetova	4	6	1
9	(Russia) Oksana Selekhmeteva	6	6
(Germany) Mara Guth	3	1

Semifinals
(Czech Republic) Linda Nosková	1	6	6
4	(Russia) Diana Shnaider	6	3	3
(Russia) Erika Andreeva	2	7	7^{7}
9	(Russia) Oksana Selekhmeteva	6	5	6^{0}

Final
(Czech Republic) Linda Nosková	7^{7}	6
(Russia) Erika Andreeva	6^{3}	3

=== Top half ===
==== Section 1 ====
First round
1	(Andorra) Victoria Jiménez Kasintseva	6	6
(Belarus) Evialina Laskevich	3	0
(France) Lucie Nguyen Tan	6	3	3
(Mexico) Julia García	3	6	6
(Russia) Anastasiia Gureva	6^{1}	4
(United States) Alexis Blokhina	7^{7}	6
(Switzerland) Sebastianna Scilipoti	6	6
16	(Peru) Dana Guzmán	4	4
10	(Russia) Maria Bondarenko	2	6	6
(United States) Elizabeth Coleman	6	4	2
(Italy) Eleonora Alvisi	2	1
(Czech Republic) Linda Nosková	6	6
(Spain) Ane Mintegi del Olmo	3	6	6
WC	(France) Flavie Brugnone	6	3	4
(Germany) Nicole Rivkin	3	2
8	(Hungary) Natália Szabanin	6	6

Second round
1	(Andorra) V Jiménez Kasintseva	6	6
(Mexico) J García	2	2
(United States) A Blokhina	4	2
(Switzerland) S Scilipoti	6	6
10	(Russia) M Bondarenko	3	0
(Czech Republic) L Nosková	6	6
(Spain) A Mintegi del Olmo	6	6
8	(Hungary) N Szabanin	1	4

Third round
1	(Andorra) V Jiménez Kasintseva	6	6
(Switzerland) S Scilipoti	3	2
(Czech Republic) L Nosková	6	6
(Spain) A Mintegi del Olmo	0	2

Quarterfinals
1	(Andorra) V Jiménez Kasintseva	5	6	3
(Czech Republic) L Nosková	7	2	6

==== Section 2 ====
First round
4	(Russia) Diana Shnaider	4	6	6
WC	(France) Loïs Boisson	6	1	4
(Croatia) Petra Marčinko	4	4
WC	(United States) Clervie Ngounoue	6	6
(Belarus) Aliona Falei	7	6
WC	(France) Nahia Berecoechea	5	2
(Czech Republic) Darja Viďmanová	6	6^{10}	6
15	(Indonesia) Priska Madelyn Nugroho	4	7^{12}	2
12	(Belgium) Sofia Costoulas	6	7
(Germany) Julia Middendorf	2	5
(Greece) Michaela Laki	7	5	6
(Russia) Alina Shcherbinina	5	7	3
(Japan) Mei Hasegawa	6	1	2
(Russia) Ekaterina Maklakova	2	6	6
WC	(France) Sarah Iliev	0	6	3
5	(United States) Robin Montgomery	6	3	6

Second round
4	(Russia) D Shnaider	7	7^{7}
WC	(United States) C Ngounoue	5	6^{5}
(Belarus) A Falei	4	1
(Czech Republic) D Viďmanová	6	6
12	(Belgium) S Costoulas	6	2	6^{1}
(Greece) M Laki	4	6	7^{7}
(Russia) E Maklakova	2	3
5	(United States) R Montgomery	6	6

Third round
4	(Russia) D Shnaider	6	6
(Czech Republic) D Viďmanová	2	1
(Greece) M Laki	2	0
5	(United States) R Montgomery	6	6

Quarterfinals
4	(Russia) D Shnaider	6	6
5	(United States) R Montgomery	3	1

=== Bottom half ===
==== Section 3 ====
First round
6	(France) Océane Babel	6	6
(United States) Reese Brantmeier	2	1
(Russia) Tatiana Barkova	4	3
(Belgium) Hanne Vandewinkel	6	6
(Russia) Erika Andreeva	6	6
(United States) Valencia Xu	0	2
(Argentina) Solana Sierra	4	2
11	(Czech Republic) Linda Fruhvirtová	6	6
13	(United States) Madison Sieg	3	6	6
(Finland) Laura Hietaranta	6	1	2
(Canada) Annabelle Xu	6	6
(Italy) Lisa Pigato	0	2
(Ukraine) Sabina Zeynalova	6	4	4
(Switzerland) Chelsea Fontenel	4	6	6
WC	(France) Laïa Petretic	4	6	5
3	(Russia) Polina Kudermetova	6	4	7

Second round
6	(France) O Babel	4	7	6
(Belgium) H Vandewinkel	6	5	4
(Russia) E Andreeva	6	7^{7}
11	(Czech Republic) L Fruhvirtová	1	6^{4}
13	(United States) M Sieg	6	4	6
(Canada) A Xu	3	6	3
(Switzerland) C Fontenel	2	6	5
3	(Russia) P Kudermetova	6	4	7

Third round
6	(France) O Babel	2	3
(Russia) E Andreeva	6	6
13	(United States) M Sieg	6	1	2
3	(Russia) P Kudermetova	3	6	6

Quarterfinals
(Russia) E Andreeva	6	1	6
3	(Russia) P Kudermetova	4	6	1

==== Section 4 ====
First round
7	(Belarus) Kristina Dmitruk	2	6	6
(Hungary) Amarissa Kiara Tóth	6	3	4
(Slovakia) Radka Zelníčková	5	2
(United States) Ashlyn Krueger	7	6
(Czech Republic) Barbora Palicová	1	6	6
(Serbia) Lola Radivojević	6	0	3
WC	(France) Mathilde Ngijol-Carré	0	3
9	(Russia) Oksana Selekhmeteva	6	6
14	(United States) Elvina Kalieva	3	4
(Germany) Mara Guth	6	6
(Denmark) Johanne Svendsen	6	4	6
(Russia) Maria Sholokhova	4	6	4
WC	(France) Maëlie Monfils	6^{3}	0
(Russia) Polina Iatcenko	7^{7}	6
(United Kingdom) Matilda Mutavdzic	6	6^{4}	6
2	(Philippines) Alex Eala	4	7^{7}	1

Second round
7	(Belarus) K Dmitruk	6	6
(United States) A Krueger	1	4
(Czech Republic) B Palicová	1	2
9	(Russia) O Selekhmeteva	6	6
(Germany) M Guth	7	6
(Denmark) J Svendsen	5	0
(Russia) P Iatcenko	6^{6}	7^{7}	6
(United Kingdom) M Mutavdzic	7^{8}	6^{1}	3

Third round
7	(Belarus) K Dmitruk	6	3	5
9	(Russia) O Selekhmeteva	2	6	7
(Germany) M Guth	6	6
(Russia) P Iatcenko	1	2

Quarterfinals
9	(Russia) O Selekhmeteva	6	6
(Germany) M Guth	3	1
