= 2011 US Open – Wheelchair women's doubles =

Wheelchair women's doubles
- 2011 US Open

Final
- Champions: (Netherlands) Esther Vergeer (Netherlands) Sharon Walraven
- Runners-up: (Netherlands) Jiske Griffioen (Netherlands) Aniek van Koot
- Score: 7–5, 6–7^{(8–10)}, 6–4

Events
Singles	men	women		boys	girls
Doubles	men	women	mixed	boys	girls
WC Singles	men	women	quad
WC Doubles	men	women	quad
Legends	men	women	mixed
← 2010 ·	US Open	· 2013 →

Defending champions Esther Vergeer and Sharon Walraven defeated Jiske Griffioen and Aniek van Koot in the final, 7–5, 6–7^{(8–10)}, 6–4 to win the women's doubles wheelchair tennis title at the 2011 US Open. With the win, they completed the Grand Slam.

== Seeds ==
1. (Netherlands) Esther Vergeer / (Netherlands) Sharon Walraven (champions)
2. (Netherlands) Jiske Griffioen / (Netherlands) Aniek van Koot (final)

== Doubles ==
=== Key ===
- Q = Qualifier
- WC = Wild card
- LL = Lucky loser
- Alt = Alternate
- ITF = ITF entry
- PR = Protected ranking
- SR = Special ranking
- SE = Special exempt
- JE = Junior exempt
- JR = Junior Accelerator Programme entrant
- CO = College Accelerator Programme entrant
- NG = Next Gen Accelerator Program entrant
- w/o = Walkover
- r = Retired
- d = Defaulted

=== Finals ===
Semifinals
1	(Netherlands) Esther Vergeer (Netherlands) Sharon Walraven	6	7
(Australia) Daniela di Toro (United States) Emmy Kaiser	2	5
(Netherlands) Marjolein Buis (Belgium) Annick Sevenans	4	6^{8}
2	(Netherlands) Jiske Griffioen (Netherlands) Aniek van Koot	6	7^{10}

Finals
1	(Netherlands) Esther Vergeer (Netherlands) Sharon Walraven	7	6^{8}	6
2	(Netherlands) Jiske Griffioen (Netherlands) Aniek van Koot	5	7^{10}	4
