= 2009 Australian Open – Wheelchair men's doubles =

Wheelchair men's doubles
- 2009 Australian Open

Final
- Champion: (Netherlands) Robin Ammerlaan (Japan) Shingo Kunieda
- Runner-up: (Sweden) Stefan Olsson (Netherlands) Maikel Scheffers
- Score: 7–5, 6–1

Events
Singles	men	women		boys	girls
Doubles	men	women	mixed	boys	girls
WC Singles	men	women	quad
WC Doubles	men	women	quad
Legends	men	women	mixed
- Australian Open

Two-time defending champion Shingo Kunieda and his partner Robin Ammerlaan defeated Stefan Olsson and Maikel Scheffers in the final, 7–5, 6–1 to win the men's doubles wheelchair tennis title at the 2009 Australian Open.

Kunieda and Satoshi Saida were the reigning champions, but Saida did not participate this year.

== Seeds ==
1. (France) Stéphane Houdet / (France) Michaël Jérémiasz (semifinals)
2. (Netherlands) Robin Ammerlaan / (Japan) Shingo Kunieda (champions)

== Draw ==
Key

- Q = Qualifier
- WC = Wild card
- LL = Lucky loser
- Alt = Alternate
- ITF = ITF entry
- PR = Protected ranking
- SR = Special ranking
- SE = Special exempt
- JE = Junior exempt
- JR = Junior Accelerator Programme entrant
- CO = College Accelerator Programme entrant
- NG = Next Gen Accelerator Program entrant
- w/o = Walkover
- r = Retired
- d = Defaulted

=== Finals ===
Semifinals
1	(France) Stéphane Houdet (France) Michaël Jérémiasz
(Sweden) Stefan Olsson (Netherlands) Maikel Scheffers	w/o
(Austria) Martin Legner (Australia) Ben Weekes	1	2
2	(Netherlands) Robin Ammerlaan (Japan) Shingo Kunieda	6	6

Final
(Sweden) Stefan Olsson (Netherlands) Maikel Scheffers	5	1
2	(Netherlands) Robin Ammerlaan (Japan) Shingo Kunieda	7	6
