= 2011 US Open – Boys' doubles =

Boys' doubles
- 2011 US Open

Final
- Champion: (Germany) Robin Kern (Germany) Julian Lenz
- Runner-up: (Moldova) Maxim Dubarenco (Ukraine) Vladyslav Manafov
- Score: 7–5, 6–4

Events
Singles	men	women		boys	girls
Doubles	men	women	mixed	boys	girls
WC Singles	men	women	quad
WC Doubles	men	women	quad
Legends	men	women	mixed
- US Open

Duilio Beretta and Oliver Golding were the defending champions but did not enter this year.

Robin Kern and Julian Lenz won the title, defeating Maxim Dubarenco and Vladyslav Manafov 7–5, 6–4 in the final.

== Seeds ==
1. (Slovakia) Filip Horanský / (Czech Republic) Jiří Veselý (semifinals)
2. (Australia) Luke Saville / (Australia) Andrew Whittington (quarterfinals)
3. (United Kingdom) George Morgan / (Austria) Dominic Thiem (semifinals)
4. (United Kingdom) Liam Broady / (United Kingdom) Oliver Golding (quarterfinals)
5. (Croatia) Mate Pavić / (Brazil) João Pedro Sorgi (quarterfinals)
6. (Bolivia) Hugo Dellien / (Ecuador) Diego Hidalgo (quarterfinals)
7. (Brazil) Thiago Moura Monteiro / (Brazil) Bruno Sant'Anna (second round)
8. (Austria) Patrick Ofner / (Chile) Matias Sborowitz (first round)

== Draw ==
Key

- Q = Qualifier
- WC = Wild card
- LL = Lucky loser
- Alt = Alternate
- ITF = ITF entry
- PR = Protected ranking
- SR = Special ranking
- SE = Special exempt
- JE = Junior exempt
- JR = Junior Accelerator Programme entrant
- CO = College Accelerator Programme entrant
- NG = Next Gen Accelerator Program entrant
- w/o = Walkover
- r = Retired
- d = Defaulted

=== Finals ===
Semifinals
1	(Slovakia) Filip Horanský (Czech Republic) Jiří Veselý	3	4
(Germany) Robin Kern (Germany) Julian Lenz	6	6
3	(United Kingdom) George Morgan (Austria) Dominic Thiem	6^{8}	4
(Moldova) Maxim Dubarenco (Ukraine) Vladyslav Manafov	7^{10}	6

Final
(Germany) Robin Kern (Germany) Julian Lenz	7	6
(Moldova) Maxim Dubarenco (Ukraine) Vladyslav Manafov	5	4

=== Top half ===
First round
1	(Slovakia) Filip Horanský (Czech Republic) Jiří Veselý	6	6
WC	(United States) Luca Corinteli (United States) Thai-Son Kwiatkowski	3	2
(United Kingdom) Luke Bambridge (Canada) Filip Peliwo	3	1
(Belgium) Kimmer Coppejans (Czech Republic) Adam Pavlásek	6	6
(Egypt) Karim Hossam (United States) Dennis Novikov	6^{9}	6	[0]
(United States) Bjorn Fratangelo (United States) Alexios Halebian	7^{11}	4	[10]
(South Korea) Jae Hwan-kim (Japan) Yoshihito Nishioka	1	2
6	(Bolivia) Hugo Dellien (Ecuador) Diego Hidalgo	6	6
4	(United Kingdom) Liam Broady (United Kingdom) Oliver Golding	7	6
(Belgium) Joris De Loore (Croatia) Mate Delić	5	2
(United States) Connor Farren (United States) Mac Styslinger	4	6	[11]
(Chile) Gonzalo Lama (Chile) Benjamin Ugarte	6	3	[9]
(Mexico) Marco Aurei Núñez (Japan) Kaichi Uchida	2	3
(Germany) Robin Kern (Germany) Julian Lenz	6	6
WC	(United States) JC Aragone (United States) Ronnie Schneider	5	3
7	(Brazil) Thiago Moura Monteiro (Brazil) Bruno Sant'anna	7	6

Second round
1	(Slovakia) F Horanský (Czech Republic) J Veselý	6	2	[10]
(Belgium) K Coppejans (Czech Republic) A Pavlásek	4	6	[8]
(United States) B Fratangelo (United States) A Halebian	4	2
6	(Bolivia) H Dellien (Ecuador) D Hidalgo	6	6
4	(United Kingdom) L Broady (United Kingdom) O Golding	6	7
(United States) C Farren (United States) M Styslinger	4	5
(Germany) R Kern (Germany) J Lenz	4	7	[10]
7	(Brazil) TM Monteiro (Brazil) B Sant'anna	6	5	[7]

Quarterfinals
1	(Slovakia) F Horanský (Czech Republic) J Veselý	6	6
6	(Bolivia) H Dellien (Ecuador) D Hidalgo	4	4
4	(United Kingdom) L Broady (United Kingdom) O Golding	6^{4}	4
(Germany) R Kern (Germany) J Lenz	7^{7}	6

Semifinals
1	(Slovakia) F Horanský (Czech Republic) J Veselý	3	4
(Germany) R Kern (Germany) J Lenz	6	6

=== Bottom half ===
First round
5	(Croatia) Mate Pavić (Brazil) João Pedro Sorgi	6	6
(Israel) Bar Botzer (Serbia) Peđa Krstin	1	3
(South Africa) Wayne Montgomery (Portugal) Frederico Ferreira Silva	2	6	[5]
(United States) Mitchell Krueger (United States) Shane Vinsant	6	3	[10]
(Russia) Aslan Karatsev (Russia) Evengy Karlovskiy	6	0	[10]
(New Zealand) Jaden Grinter (Philippines) Jeson Patrombon	4	6	[6]
WC	(United States) Brett Clark (United States) Martin Redlicki	4	5
3	(United Kingdom) George Morgan (Austria) Dominic Thiem	6	7
8	(Austria) Patrick Ofner (Chile) Matías Sborowitz	2	3
(United States) Marcos Giron (Australia) Ben Wagland	6	6
WC	(United States) Gage Brymer (United States) Noah Rubin	1	2
(Moldova) Maxim Dubarenco (Ukraine) V Manafov	6	6
(United Kingdom) Kyle Edmund (Serbia) Nikola Milojević	4	2
(Belgium) Julian Cagnina (France) Enzo Couacaud	6	6
(Austria) Dennis Novak (Belarus) Yaraslau Shyla	7	3	[8]
2	(Australia) Luke Saville (Australia) Andrew Whittington	5	6	[10]

Second round
5	(Croatia) M Pavić (Brazil) JP Sorgi	6	6
(United States) M Kruger (United States) S Vinsant	4	4
(Russia) A Karatsev (Russia) E Karlovskiy	3	6	[6]
3	(United Kingdom) G Morgan (Austria) D Thiem	6	4	[10]
(United States) M Giron (Australia) B Wagland	2	1
(Moldova) M Dubarenco (Ukraine) V Manafov	6	6
(Belgium) J Cagnina (France) E Couacaud	2	4
2	(Australia) L Saville (Australia) A Whittington	6	6

Quarterfinals
5	(Croatia) M Pavić (Brazil) JP Sorgi	6^{1}	2
3	(United Kingdom) G Morgan (Austria) D Thiem	7^{7}	6
(Moldova) M Dubarenco (Ukraine) V Manafov	6	2	[10]
2	(Australia) L Saville (Australia) A Whittington	4	6	[8]

Semifinals
3	(United Kingdom) G Morgan (Austria) D Thiem	6^{8}	4
(Moldova) M Dubarenco (Ukraine) V Manafov	7^{10}	6
