= 2011 US Open – Girls' singles =

Girls' singles
- 2011 US Open

Final
- Champion: (United States) Grace Min
- Runner-up: (France) Caroline Garcia
- Score: 7–5, 7–6^{(7–3)}

Events
Singles	men	women		boys	girls
Doubles	men	women	mixed	boys	girls
WC Singles	men	women	quad
WC Doubles	men	women	quad
Legends	men	women	mixed
- US Open

Daria Gavrilova was the defending champion, but lost to Victoria Duval in the second round.

Unseeded Grace Min defeated first seed Caroline Garcia in the final 7–5, 7–6^{(7–3)} to win the tournament.

== Seeds ==
1. (France) Caroline Garcia (final)
2. (Russia) Irina Khromacheva (first round)
3. (Australia) Ashleigh Barty (semifinals)
4. (Canada) Eugenie Bouchard (second round)
5. (Russia) Daria Gavrilova (second round)
6. (Russia) Yulia Putintseva (quarterfinals)
7. (Paraguay) Montserrat González (first round)
8. (Serbia) Natalija Kostić (first round)
9. (Netherlands) Indy de Vroome (first round)
10. (Germany) Annika Beck (second round)
11. (Argentina) Victoria Bosio (second round)
12. (United States) Madison Keys (second round)
13. (Estonia) Anett Kontaveit (second round)
14. (United States) Jessica Pegula (second round, retired)
15. (Czech Republic) Jesika Malečková (first round)
16. (Slovakia) Anna Karolína Schmiedlová (second round)

== Main draw ==
Key

- Q = Qualifier
- WC = Wild card
- LL = Lucky loser
- Alt = Alternate
- ITF = ITF entry
- PR = Protected ranking
- SR = Special ranking
- SE = Special exempt
- JE = Junior exempt
- JR = Junior Accelerator Programme entrant
- CO = College Accelerator Programme entrant
- NG = Next Gen Accelerator Program entrant
- w/o = Walkover
- r = Retired
- d = Defaulted

=== Finals ===
Quarterfinals
1	(France) Caroline Garcia	6	6
(United States) Victoria Duval	3	4
3	(Australia) Ashleigh Barty	6	7
WC	(United States) Krista Hardebeck	0	5
6	(Russia) Yulia Putintseva	6	4	2
Q	(United States) Nicole Gibbs	1	6	6
(Sweden) Ellen Allgurin	6^{1}	2
(United States) Grace Min	7^{7}	6

Semifinals
1	(France) Caroline Garcia	6	6
3	(Australia) Ashleigh Barty	3	2
Q	(United States) Nicole Gibbs	3	3
(United States) Grace Min	6	6

Final
1	(France) Caroline Garcia	5	6^{3}
(United States) Grace Min	7	7^{7}

=== Top half ===
==== Section 1 ====
First round
1	(France) Caroline Garcia	6	6
(South Korea) Lee So-ra	3	2
WC	(United States) Peggy Porter	6^{3}	6^{1}
(Austria) Barbara Haas	7^{7}	7^{7}
WC	(United States) Sachia Vickery	6	6
(Croatia) Iva Mekovec	0	1
(United States) Alexandra Kiick	1	6	2
13	(Estonia) Anett Kontaveit	6	1	6
12	(United States) Madison Keys	6	6^{1}	6
(New Zealand) Emily Fanning	1	7^{7}	3
(Canada) Françoise Abanda	6	6
(Madagascar) Zarah Razafimahatratra	3	1
(United States) Victoria Duval	4	6	6
Q	(Mexico) Ana Sofía Sánchez	6	1	3
(Japan) Ayaka Okuno	1	2
5	(Russia) Daria Gavrilova	6	6

Second round
1	(France) C Garcia	5	6	6
(Austria) B Haas	7	1	1
WC	(United States) S Vickery	6	6
13	(Estonia) A Kontaveit	2	1
12	(United States) M Keys	5	1
(Canada) F Abanda	7	6
(United States) V Duval	6	6^{3}	6
5	(Russia) D Gavrilova	3	7^{7}	3

Third round
1	(France) C Garcia	6	6
WC	(United States) S Vickery	4	4
(Canada) F Abanda	1	1
(United States) V Duval	6	6

Quarterfinals
1	(France) C Garcia	6	6
(United States) V Duval	3	4

==== Section 2 ====
First round
3	(Australia) Ashleigh Barty	6	6
(Canada) Carol Zhao	2	2
(Kazakhstan) Anna Danilina	3	4
(United States) Gabrielle Andrews	6	6
(Romania) Elena-Teodora Cadar	6	6^{4}	6^{7}
(United States) Kyle McPhillips	1	7^{7}	7^{9}
(Ecuador) Doménica González	2	6^{3}
16	(Slovakia) Anna Karolína Schmiedlová	6	7^{7}
10	(Germany) Annika Beck	6	6
(Czech Republic) Klára Fabíková	2	2
Q	(United States) Julia Elbaba	3	1
(Japan) Risa Ozaki	6	6
(Netherlands) Demi Schuurs	2	2
(United States) Stephanie Nauta	6	6
WC	(United States) Krista Hardebeck	6	6
8	(Serbia) Natalija Kostić	1	1

Second round
3	(Australia) A Barty	6	6
(United States) G Andrews	4	0
(United States) K McPhillips	6	1	7
16	(Slovakia) AK Schmiedlová	4	6	5
10	(Germany) A Beck	7	4	4
(Japan) R Ozaki	5	6	6
(United States) S Nauta	3	2
WC	(United States) K Hardebeck	6	6

Third round
3	(Australia) A Barty	6	6
(United States) K McPhillips	4	3
(Japan) R Ozaki	1	2
WC	(United States) K Hardebeck	6	6

Quarterfinals
3	(Australia) A Barty	6	7
WC	(United States) K Hardebeck	0	5

=== Bottom half ===
==== Section 3 ====
First round
6	(Russia) Yulia Putintseva	3	6	6
Q	(Mexico) Marcela Zacarías	6	4	2
(Slovakia) Viktória Maľová	3	3
WC	(United States) Samantha Crawford	6	6
(Croatia) Donna Vekić	6	6
(United States) Christina Makarova	1	2
(Japan) Nao Hibino	6	1	6^{5}
11	(Argentina) Victoria Bosio	4	6	7^{7}
15	(Czech Republic) Jesika Malečková	1	4
WC	(United States) Taylor Townsend	6	6
WC	(United States) Anne-Liz Jeukeng	6^{10}	3
(Ecuador) Marie Elise Casares	7^{12}	6
Q	(United States) Nicole Gibbs	6	6
(Peru) Patricia Kú Flores	1	1
(Bolivia) María Paula Deheza	0	1
4	(Canada) Eugenie Bouchard	6	6

Second round
6	(Russia) Y Putintseva	6	6
WC	(United States) S Crawford	2	1
(Croatia) D Vekić	6	6
11	(Argentina) V Bosio	2	3
WC	(United States) T Townsend	7^{7}	6
(Ecuador) ME Casares	6^{3}	1
Q	(United States) N Gibbs	6	6^{7}	6
4	(Canada) E Bouchard	0	7^{9}	3

Third round
6	(Russia) Y Putintseva	6	6
(Croatia) D Vekić	0	2
WC	(United States) T Townsend	6	3	4
Q	(United States) N Gibbs	3	6	6

Quarterfinals
6	(Russia) Y Putintseva	6	4	2
Q	(United States) N Gibbs	1	6	6

==== Section 4 ====
First round
7	(Paraguay) Montserrat González	4	6	5
WC	(United States) Hayley Carter	6	3	7
WC	(United States) Hannah King	5	3
(Belarus) Aliaksandra Sasnovich	7	6
Q	(Turkey) Başak Eraydın	3	4
Q	(United States) Kimberly Yee	6	6
(Sweden) Ellen Allgurin	7^{8}	6
9	(Netherlands) Indy de Vroome	6^{6}	2
14	(United States) Jessica Pegula	6	6
(Czech Republic) Petra Rohanová	1	1
(Japan) Makoto Ninomiya	6^{3}	5
Q	(South Korea) Jang Su-jeong	7^{7}	7
Q	(Israel) Valeria Patiuk	6	6
(Ukraine) Ganna Poznikhirenko	4	3
(United States) Grace Min	7^{7}	6
2	(Russia) Irina Khromacheva	6^{5}	4

Second round
WC	(United States) H Carter	2	4
(Belarus) A Sasnovich	6	6
Q	(United States) K Yee	6^{6}	0
(Sweden) E Allgurin	7^{8}	6
14	(United States) J Pegula	6	3	0^{r}
Q	(South Korea) S-j Jang	0	6	1
Q	(Israel) V Patiuk	3	0
(United States) G Min	6	6

Third round
(Belarus) A Sasnovich	0	1
(Sweden) E Allgurin	6	6
Q	(South Korea) S-j Jang	4	3
(United States) G Min	6	6

Quarterfinals
(Sweden) E Allgurin	6^{1}	2
(United States) G Min	7^{7}	6
