= Katharina Krüger =

German wheelchair tennis player

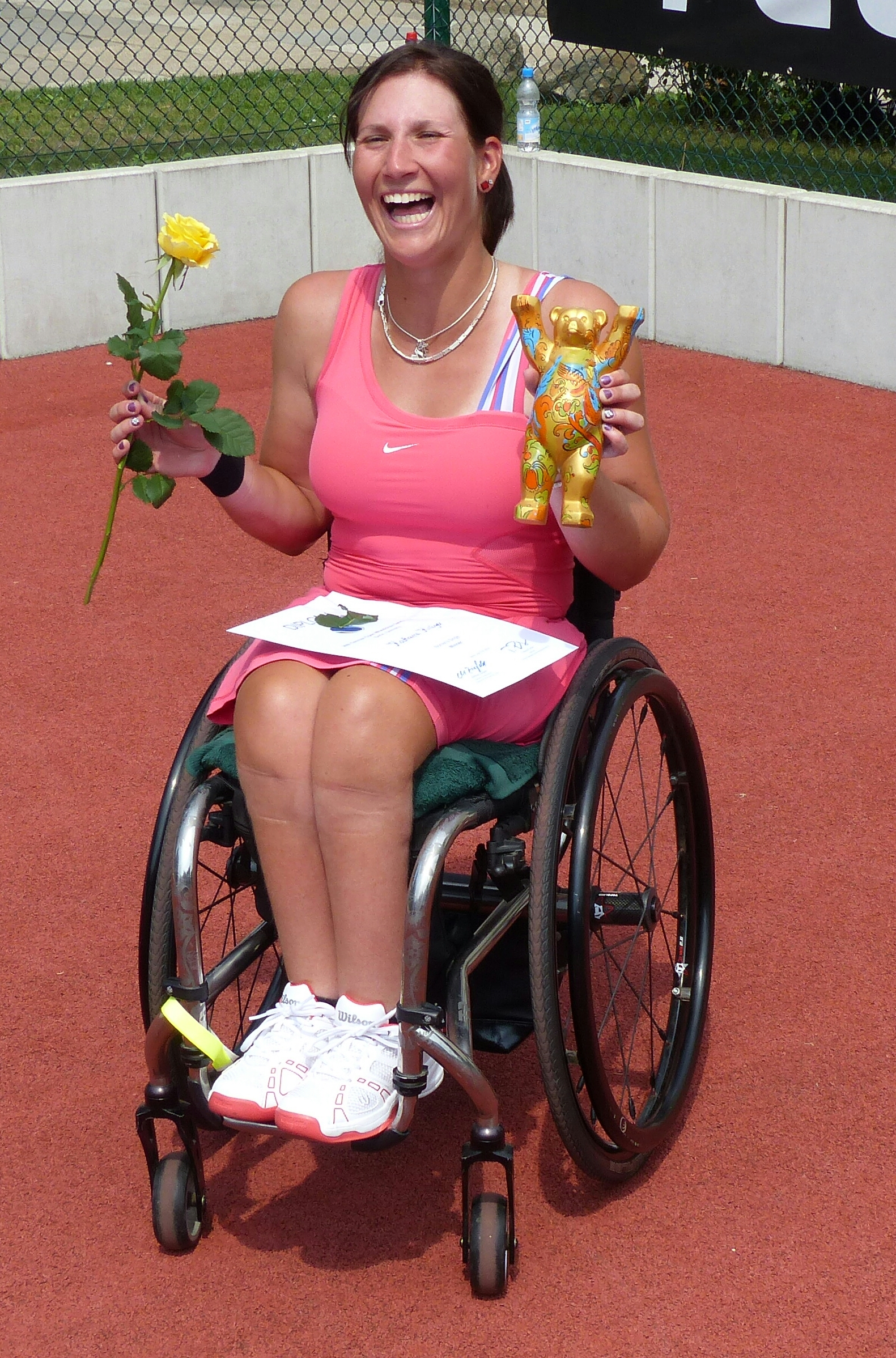
- Country (sports): Germany
- Residence: Berlin, Germany
- Born: 3 January 1990 (age 36) Zehlendorf, West Berlin, West Germany
- Turned pro: 2001
- Plays: Right-handed (one-handed backhand)

Singles
- Career record: 612–407
- Highest ranking: No. 6 (24 August 2009)
- Current ranking: No. 22 (16 March 2020)

Grand Slam singles results
- Australian Open: QF (2015, 2017, 2018)
- French Open: QF (2010, 2013, 2018, 2023)
- Wimbledon: QF (2018)
- US Open: QF (2022)

Other tournaments
- Paralympic Games: 2R (2012, 2016)

Doubles
- Career record: 436–322
- Highest ranking: No. 5 (2 February 2009)
- Current ranking: No. 14 (16 March 2020)

Grand Slam doubles results
- Australian Open: F (2009)
- French Open: SF (2010, 2013, 2018)
- Wimbledon: SF (2009, 2014, 2015, 2018)
- US Open: QF (2022, 2023)

Other doubles tournaments
- Paralympic Games: QF (2012)

Katharina Krüger (born 3 January 1990) is a German wheelchair tennis player who competes in international level events. In the singles she is a three-time quarterfinalist in the Australian Open and four-time quarterfinalist in the French Open. She has participated at three Summer Paralympic Games and reached the second round in the singles' events. In the doubles she was a runner-up in the 2009 Australian Open where she partnered with Agnieszka Wysocka and lost to Korie Homan and Esther Vergeer in the final. Krüger has used a wheelchair from an early age as she was born with spina bifida.
