= Agnieszka Bartczak =

Polish retired wheelchair tennis player

- Born: July 10, 1981 (age 43); Gądkowice, Poland
- Turned pro: 1999
- Retired: 2016
- Plays: Right-handed (one-handed backhand)

Singles
- Career titles: 16
- Highest ranking: No. 6 (26 June 2006)

Grand Slam singles results
- Australian Open: SF (2003)

Other tournaments
- Paralympic Games: 2R (2004)

Doubles
- Career titles: 7
- Highest ranking: No. 10 (2 February 2009)

Grand Slam doubles results
- Australian Open: F (2009)

Agnieszka Bartczak-Wysocka (born 10 July 1981) is a Polish retired wheelchair tennis player. She reached World number 6 in June 2006 in singles and World number 10 in doubles. She was a finalist in the 2009 Australian Open in the wheelchair women's doubles with partner Katharina Krüger. She has also competed at the 2004 and 2008 Summer Paralympics.
