= Nicholas Taylor =

Nicholas or Nick Taylor may refer to:

== Sportspeople ==
- Nick Taylor (cricketer, born 1963), English cricketer
- Nick Taylor (squash player) (born 1971), British squash player and squash coach
- Nicholas Taylor (tennis) (born 1979), American wheelchair tennis player
- Nick Taylor (basketball) (born 1980), Australian Paralympic wheelchair basketball player
- Nick Taylor (golfer) (born 1988), Canadian professional golfer
- Nick Taylor (Canadian football) (born 1988), defensive back with the Orlando Predators
- Nick Taylor (cricketer, born 1996), English cricketer
- Nick Taylor (footballer) (born 1998), American-Cambodian soccer player
- Nick Taylor (rugby league), rugby league player with the Coventry Bears

== Other people ==
- Nicholas Taylor (politician) (1927–2020), Canadian politician
- Nick Taylor (Bloodrock) (1946–2010), American hard rock and rhythm guitarist/musician for the Texas band Bloodrock
- Van Taylor (Nicholas Van Campen Taylor, born 1972), American politician

== See also ==
- Nic Taylor (born 1991), British footballer
