= 2011 US Open – Day-by-day summaries =

== Day 1 (August 29) ==
Top American Mardy Fish opened proceedings cruising past German Tobias Kamke 6–2, 6–2, 6–1. While, another American Ryan Harrison fell to 27th seed Marin Čilić 6–2, 7–5, 7–6^{(8–6)}, after wasting leads in the second and third set. No. 13 seed Richard Gasquet then played the inaugural match at the newest show court, Court 17, defeating Sergiy Stakhovsky in straight sets 6–4, 6–4, 6–0. Five-time champion and 3rd seed Roger Federer defeated Santiago Giraldo 6–4, 6–3, 6–2. Other seeds who cruised through were Gaël Monfils, Tomáš Berdych, Alexandr Dolgopolov, Radek Štěpánek and Janko Tipsarević. While 15th seed Viktor Troicki and 29th seed Michaël Llodra, were both pushed to a final set with Llodra prevailing over Victor Hănescu, while Troicki was the first upset of the tournament losing to Alejandro Falla.

On the women's side former champion Maria Sharapova was pushed by Britain's Heather Watson in three sets 3–6, 7–5, 6–3. While, the American woman had mixed results, out of 8 on court 4 of them being led by 2-time champion Venus Williams, Madison Keys, Irina Falconi, and Christina McHale. Most of the top seeds also advanced to the second round, led by last year's finalist and 2nd seed Vera Zvonareva, the Russian was joined by Marion Bartoli, Samantha Stosur, Agnieszka Radwańska, Peng Shuai and Dominika Cibulková. The major upset of the opening day saw Wimbledon Champion Petra Kvitová as she fell to Alexandra Dulgheru in straight sets 7–6^{(7–3)}, 6–3, hitting 52 unforced errors. This also marks the first time in the Open Era that a reigning Wimbledon Champion has lost in the first round of the US Open.

- Schedule of Play
- Seeds out:
  - Men's Singles: (Serbia) Viktor Troicki [15]
  - Women's Singles: (Czech Republic) Petra Kvitová [5]

Matches on main courts
Event	Winner	Loser	Score
Matches on Arthur Ashe Stadium
Men's Singles 1st Round	(United States) Mardy Fish [8]	(Germany) Tobias Kamke	6–2, 6–2, 6–1
Women's Singles 1st Round	(Russia) Maria Sharapova [3]	(United Kingdom) Heather Watson	3–6, 7–5, 6–3
2011 US Open Opening Night Ceremony
Women's Singles 1st Round	(United States) Venus Williams	(Russia) Vesna Dolonts	6–4, 6–3
Men's Singles 1st Round	(Switzerland) Roger Federer [3]	(Colombia) Santiago Giraldo	6–4, 6–3, 6–2
Matches on Louis Armstrong Stadium
Men's Singles 1st Round	(Croatia) Marin Čilić [27]	(United States) Ryan Harrison [WC]	6–2, 7–5, 7–6^{(8–6)}
Women's Singles 1st Round	(Romania) Alexandra Dulgheru	(Czech Republic) Petra Kvitová [5]	7–6^{(7–3)}, 6–3
Women's Singles 1st Round	(Russia) Vera Zvonareva [2]	(France) Stéphanie Foretz Gacon [Q]	6–3, 6–0
Women's Singles 1st Round	(France) Marion Bartoli [8]	(Russia) Alexandra Panova [Q]	7–5, 6–3
Men's Singles 1st Round	(France) Gaël Monfils [7]	(Bulgaria) Grigor Dimitrov	7–6^{(7–4)}, 6–3, 6–4
Matches on the Grandstand
Men's Singles 1st Round	(Czech Republic) Tomáš Berdych [9]	(France) Romain Jouan [Q]	6–2, 7–6^{(7–4)}, 6–1
Women's Singles 1st Round	(United States) Madison Keys [WC]	(United States) Jill Craybas [WC]	6–2, 6–4
Men's Singles 1st Round	(Colombia) Alejandro Falla	(Serbia) Victor Troicki [15]	3–6, 6–3, 4–6, 7–5, 7–5
Women's Singles 1st Round	(Slovenia) Polona Hercog	(United States) Bethanie Mattek-Sands	6–1, 6–3
Colored background indicates a night match

== Day 2 (August 30) ==
- Schedule of Play
- Seeds out:
  - Men's Singles: (Russia) Mikhail Youzhny [16], (Croatia) Ivan Dodig [32]
  - Women's Singles: (China) Li Na [6], (Slovakia) Daniela Hantuchová [21], (Spain) María José Martínez Sánchez [32]

Matches on main courts
Event	Winner	Loser	Score
Matches on Arthur Ashe Stadium
Women's Singles 1st Round	(Belarus) Victoria Azarenka [4]	(Sweden) Johanna Larsson	6–1, 6–3
Women's Singles 1st Round	(Denmark) Caroline Wozniacki [1]	(Spain) Nuria Llagostera Vives	6–3, 6–1
Men's Singles 1st Round	(Serbia) Novak Djokovic [1]	(Republic of Ireland) Conor Niland [Q]	6–0, 5–1, retired
Women's Singles 1st Round	(Serbia) Ana Ivanovic [16]	(Russia) Ksenia Pervak	6–4, 6–2
Men's Singles 1st Round	(Spain) Rafael Nadal [2]	(Kazakhstan) Andrey Golubev	6–3, 7–6^{(7–1)}, 7–5
Women's Singles 1st Round	(United States) Serena Williams [28]	(Serbia) Bojana Jovanovski	6–1, 6–1
Matches on Louis Armstrong Stadium
Men's Singles 1st Round	(Spain) David Ferrer [5]	(Russia) Igor Andreev	2–6, 6–3, 6–0, 6–4
Women's Singles 1st Round	(Italy) Francesca Schiavone [7]	(Kazakhstan) Galina Voskoboeva [Q]	6–3, 1–6, 6–4
Women's Singles 1st Round	(Romania) Simona Halep	(China) Li Na [6]	6–2, 7–5
Men's Singles 1st Round	(United States) James Blake	(Netherlands) Jesse Huta Galung [Q]	6–4, 6–2, 4–6, 6–4
Matches on the Grandstand
Men's Singles 1st Round	(France) Jo-Wilfried Tsonga [11]	(Chinese Taipei) Lu Yen-hsun	6–4, 6–4, 6–4
Women's Singles 1st Round	(Serbia) Jelena Janković [11]	(United States) Alison Riske [WC]	6–2, 6–0
Men's Singles 1st Round	(Spain) Fernando Verdasco [19]	(Finland) Jarkko Nieminen	3–6, 6–4, 6–1, 6–4
Colored background indicates a night match

== Day 3 (August 31) ==
- Schedule of Play
- Seeds out:
  - Men's Singles: (Spain) Nicolás Almagro [10]
  - Women's Singles: (France) Marion Bartoli [8], (Poland) Agnieszka Radwańska [12], (Slovakia) Dominika Cibulková [14], (Belgium) Yanina Wickmayer [20]
  - Men's Doubles: (United States) Bob Bryan / (United States) Mike Bryan [1], (Czech Republic) František Čermák / (Slovakia) Filip Polášek [11], (United States) Scott Lipsky / (United States) Rajeev Ram [16]
  - Women's Doubles: (Chinese Taipei) Chan Yung-jan / (Australia) Anastasia Rodionova [10], (Chinese Taipei) Chuang Chia-jung / (Belarus) Olga Govortsova [13]

Matches on main courts
Event	Winner	Loser	Score
Matches on Arthur Ashe Stadium
Women's Singles 2nd Round	(Russia) Vera Zvonareva [2]	(Ukraine) Kateryna Bondarenko	7–5, 3–6, 6–3
Men's Singles 1st Round	(United Kingdom) Andy Murray [4]	(India) Somdev Devvarman	7–6^{(7–5)}, 6–2, 6–3
Women's Singles 2nd Round	(Germany) Sabine Lisicki [22]	(United States) Venus Williams	walkover
Women's Singles 2nd Round	(United States) Irina Falconi	(Slovakia) Dominika Cibulková [14]	2–6, 6–3, 7–5
Men's Singles 1st Round	(United States) Andy Roddick [21]	(United States) Michael Russell	6–2, 6–4, 4–6, 7–5
Women's Singles 2nd Round	(Russia) Maria Sharapova [3]	(Belarus) Anastasiya Yakimova	6–1, 6–1
Matches on Louis Armstrong Stadium
Women's Singles 2nd Round	(Czech Republic) Lucie Šafářová [27]	(United States) Madison Keys [WC]	3–6, 7–5, 6–4
Men's Singles 1st Round	(Argentina) Juan Martín del Potro [18]	(Italy) Filippo Volandri	6–3, 6–1, 6–1
Women's Singles 2nd Round	(Australia) Samantha Stosur [9]	(United States) Coco Vandeweghe	6–3, 6–4
Men's Singles 1st Round	(United States) John Isner [28]	(Cyprus) Marcos Baghdatis	7–6^{(7–2)}, 7–6^{(13–11)}, 2–6, 6–4
Matches on the Grandstand
Men's Singles 1st Round	(Brazil) Rogério Dutra da Silva [LL]	(Republic of Ireland) Louk Sorensen [Q]	6–0, 3–6, 6–4, 1–0, retired
Women's Singles 2nd Round	(United States) Christina McHale	(France) Marion Bartoli [8]	7–6^{(7–2)}, 6–2
Men's Singles 1st Round	(United States) Robby Ginepri [WC]	(Brazil) João Souza [Q]	6–3, 6–4, 6–7^{(5–7)}, 6–1
Women's Singles 2nd Round	(Germany) Angelique Kerber	(Poland) Agnieszka Radwańska [12]	6–3, 4–6, 6–3
Colored background indicates a night match

== Day 4 (September 1) ==
- Schedule of Play
- Seeds out:
  - Men's Singles: (France) Gaël Monfils [7], (France) Richard Gasquet [13], (Czech Republic) Radek Štěpánek [23], (France) Michaël Llodra [29]
  - Women's Singles: (Israel) Shahar Pe'er [23], (Australia) Jarmila Gajdošová [29], (Estonia) Kaia Kanepi [31]
  - Men's Doubles: (Germany) Christopher Kas / (Austria) Alexander Peya [10]
  - Women's Doubles: (China) Peng Shuai / (China) Zheng Jie [7], (South Africa) Natalie Grandin / (Czech Republic) Vladimíra Uhlířová [11]
  - Mixed Doubles: (Kazakhstan) Yaroslava Shvedova / (Belarus) Max Mirnyi [3], (India) Sania Mirza / (India) Mahesh Bhupathi [6]

Matches on main courts
Event	Winner	Loser	Score
Matches on Arthur Ashe Stadium
Women's Singles 2nd Round	(Italy) Francesca Schiavone [7]	(Croatia) Mirjana Lučić	6–1, 6–1
Men's Singles 2nd Round	(Switzerland) Roger Federer [3]	(Israel) Dudi Sela	6–3, 6–2, 6–2
Women's Singles 2nd Round	(United States) Serena Williams [28]	(Netherlands) Michaëlla Krajicek [Q]	6–0, 6–1
Women's Singles 2nd Round	(Denmark) Caroline Wozniacki [1]	(Netherlands) Arantxa Rus	6–2, 6–0
Men's Singles 2nd Round	(Serbia) Novak Djokovic [1]	(Argentina) Carlos Berlocq	6–0, 6–0, 6–2
Matches on Louis Armstrong Stadium
Women's Singles 2nd Round	(Serbia) Jelena Janković [11]	(Australia) Jelena Dokić	6–3, 6–4
Men's Singles 2nd Round	(Spain) Juan Carlos Ferrero	(France) Gaël Monfils [7]	7–6^{(7–5)}, 5–7, 6–7^{(5–7)}, 6–4, 6–4
Men's Singles 2nd Round	(United States) Mardy Fish [8]	(Tunisia) Malek Jaziri [Q]	6–2, 6–2, 6–4
Women's Singles 2nd Round	(Belarus) Victoria Azarenka [4]	(Argentina) Gisela Dulko	6–4, 6–3
Matches on the Grandstand
Men's Singles 2nd Round	(Czech Republic) Tomáš Berdych [9]	(Italy) Fabio Fognini	7–5, 6–0, 6–0
Women's Singles 2nd Round	(Germany) Andrea Petkovic [10]	(China) Jie Zheng	3–6, 6–3, 6–3
Men's Singles 2nd Round	(France) Jo-Wilfried Tsonga [11]	(Ukraine) Sergei Bubka [Q]	6–3, 7–5, 6–2
Women's Singles 2nd Round	(United States) Sloane Stephens [WC]	(Israel) Shahar Pe'er [23]	6–1, 7–6^{(7–4)}
Colored background indicates a night match

== Day 5 (September 2) ==
- Schedule of Play
- Seeds out:
  - Men's Singles: (Switzerland) Stanislas Wawrinka [14], (Austria) Jürgen Melzer [17], (Croatia) Ivan Ljubičić [30]
  - Women's Singles: (Russia) Maria Sharapova [3], (Germany) Julia Görges [19], (Russia) Nadia Petrova [24], (Czech Republic) Lucie Šafářová [27], (Spain) Anabel Medina Garrigues [30]
  - Men's Doubles: (Belarus) Max Mirnyi / (Canada) Daniel Nestor [2], (Brazil) Marcelo Melo / (Brazil) Bruno Soares [12]
  - Women's Doubles: (Spain) Nuria Llagostera Vives / (Spain) Arantxa Parra Santonja [14]
  - Mixed Doubles: (United States) Vania King / (India) Rohan Bopanna [5]

Matches on main courts
Event	Winner	Loser	Score
Matches on Arthur Ashe Stadium
Women's Singles 3rd Round	(Russia) Vera Zvonareva [2]	(Spain) Anabel Medina Garrigues [30]	6–4, 7–5
Women's Singles 3rd Round	(Italy) Flavia Pennetta [26]	(Russia) Maria Sharapova [3]	6–3, 3–6, 6–4
Men's Singles 2nd Round	(Spain) Rafael Nadal [2]	(France) Nicolas Mahut	6–2, 6–2, retired
Women's Singles 3rd Round	(Russia) Maria Kirilenko [25]	(United States) Christina McHale	6–2, 6–3
Men's Singles 2nd Round	(United States) Andy Roddick [21]	(United States) Jack Sock	6–3, 6–3, 6–4
Matches on Louis Armstrong Stadium
Women's Singles 3rd Round	(Romania) Monica Niculescu	(Czech Republic) Lucie Šafářová [27]	6–0, 6–1
Men's Singles 2nd Round	(United States) John Isner [28]	(United States) Robby Ginepri [WC]	6–4, 6–3, 6–4
Men's Singles 2nd Round	(United Kingdom) Andy Murray [4]	(Netherlands) Robin Haase	6–7^{(5–7)}, 2–6, 6–2, 6–0, 6–4
Women's Singles 3rd Round	(Australia) Samantha Stosur [9]	(Russia) Nadia Petrova [24]	7–6^{(7–5)}, 6–7^{(5–7)}, 7–5
Matches on the Grandstand
Men's Singles 2nd Round	(Argentina) Juan Martín del Potro [18]	(Argentina) Diego Junqueira	6–2, 6–1, 7–5
Women's Singles 3rd Round	(China) Peng Shuai [13]	(Germany) Julia Görges [19]	6–4, 7–6^{(7–1)}
Women's Singles 3rd Round	(Germany) Sabine Lisicki [22]	(United States) Irina Falconi	6–0, 6–1
Men's Singles 2nd Round	(Spain) David Ferrer [5]	(United States) James Blake	6–4, 6–3, 6–4
Colored background indicates a night match

== Day 6 (September 3) ==
- Schedule of Play
- Seeds out:
  - Men's Singles: (Czech Republic) Tomáš Berdych [9], (Spain) Fernando Verdasco [19], (Croatia) Marin Čilić [27], (Spain) Marcel Granollers [31]
  - Women's Singles: (Belarus) Victoria Azarenka [4], (Serbia) Jelena Janković [11], (Italy) Roberta Vinci [18]
  - Men's Doubles: (United States) Eric Butorac / (Curaçao) Jean-Julien Rojer [8], (Argentina) Juan Ignacio Chela / (Argentina) Eduardo Schwank [14]
  - Mixed Doubles: (United States) Liezel Huber / (United States) Bob Bryan [1], (Slovenia) Katarina Srebotnik / (Canada) Daniel Nestor [2]

Matches on main courts
Event	Winner	Loser	Score
Matches on Arthur Ashe Stadium
Women's Singles 3rd Round	(Denmark) Caroline Wozniacki [1]	(United States) Vania King	6–2, 6–4
Men's Singles 3rd Round	(Switzerland) Roger Federer [3]	(Croatia) Marin Čilić [27]	6–3, 4–6, 6–4, 6–2
Women's Singles 3rd Round	(United States) Serena Williams [28]	(Belarus) Victoria Azarenka [4]	6–1, 7–6^{(7–5)}
Women's Singles 3rd Round	(Serbia) Ana Ivanovic [16]	(United States) Sloane Stephens [WC]	6–3, 6–4
Men's Singles 3rd Round	(Serbia) Novak Djokovic [1]	(Russia) Nikolay Davydenko	6–3, 6–4, 6–2
Matches on Louis Armstrong Stadium
Men's Singles 3rd Round	(Serbia) Janko Tipsarević [20]	(Czech Republic) Tomáš Berdych [9]	6–4, 5–0, retired
Women's Singles 3rd Round	(Russia) Anastasia Pavlyuchenkova [17]	(Serbia) Jelena Janković [11]	6–4, 6–4
Men's Singles 3rd Round	(United States) Mardy Fish [8]	(South Africa) Kevin Anderson	6–4, 7–6^{(7–4)}, 7–6^{(7–3)}
Women's Singles 3rd Round	(Russia) Svetlana Kuznetsova [15]	(Uzbekistan) Akgul Amanmuradova	6–4, 6–2
Matches on the Grandstand
Women's Singles 3rd Round	(Italy) Francesca Schiavone [7]	(South Africa) Chanelle Scheepers	5–7, 7–6^{(7–5)}, 6–3
Women's Singles 3rd Round	(Germany) Andrea Petkovic [10]	(Italy) Roberta Vinci [18]	6–4, 6–0
Men's Singles 3rd Round	(Argentina) Juan Mónaco	(Germany) Tommy Haas [PR]	6–7^{(3–7)}, 6–3, 6–2, 6–3
Men's Singles 3rd Round	(France) Jo-Wilfried Tsonga [11]	(Spain) Fernando Verdasco [19]	6–3, 7–5, 6–4
Colored background indicates a night match

== Day 7 (September 4) ==
- Schedule of Play
- Seeds out:
  - Men's Singles: (Argentina) Juan Martín del Potro [18], (Argentina) Juan Ignacio Chela [24], (Spain) Feliciano López [25], (Germany) Florian Mayer [26]
  - Women's Singles: (China) Peng Shuai [13], (Germany) Sabine Lisicki [22], (Russia) Maria Kirilenko [25]
  - Men's Doubles: (Spain) Marcel Granollers / (Spain) Marc López [13] (withdrew), (The Bahamas) Mark Knowles / (Belgium) Xavier Malisse [15]
  - Women's Doubles: (India) Sania Mirza / (Russia) Elena Vesnina [6], (Australia) Jarmila Gajdošová / (United States) Bethanie Mattek-Sands [16]

Matches on main courts
Event	Winner	Loser	Score
Matches on Arthur Ashe Stadium
Men's Singles 3rd Round	(Spain) Rafael Nadal [2]	(Argentina) David Nalbandian	7–6^{(7–5)}, 6–1, 7–5
Men's Singles 3rd Round	(United States) Andy Roddick [21]	(France) Julien Benneteau [WC]	6–1, 6–4, 7–6^{(7–5)}
Men's Singles 3rd Round	(United Kingdom) Andy Murray [4]	(Spain) Feliciano López [25]	6–1, 6–4, 6–2
Women's Singles 4th Round	(Russia) Vera Zvonareva [2]	(Germany) Sabine Lisicki [22]	6–2, 6–3
Matches on Louis Armstrong Stadium
Women's Singles 4th Round	(Italy) Flavia Pennetta [26]	(China) Peng Shuai [13]	6–4, 7–6^{(8–6)}
Men's Singles 3rd Round	(France) Gilles Simon [12]	(Argentina) Juan Martín del Potro [18]	4–6, 7–6^{(7–5)}, 6–2, 7–6^{(7–3)}
Men's Singles 3rd Round	(United States) John Isner [28]	(United States) Alex Bogomolov, Jr.	7–6^{(11–9)}, 6–4, 6–4
Matches on the Grandstand
Men's Singles 3rd Round	(Luxembourg) Gilles Müller	(Russia) Igor Kunitsyn	6–1, 6–4, 6–4
Men's Singles 3rd Round	(United States) Donald Young [WC]	(Argentina) Juan Ignacio Chela [24]	7–5, 6–4, 6–3
Women's Doubles 3rd Round	(United States) Liezel Huber [4] (United States) Lisa Raymond [4]	(Australia) Jarmila Gajdošová [16] (United States) Bethanie Mattek-Sands [16]	6–2, 7–6^{(7–5)}
Women's Singles 4th Round	(Australia) Samantha Stosur [9]	(Russia) Maria Kirilenko [25]	6–2, 6–7^{(15–17)}, 6–3
Colored background indicates a night match

== Day 8 (September 5) ==
- Schedule of Play
- Seeds out:
  - Men's Singles: (United States) Mardy Fish [8], (Ukraine) Alexandr Dolgopolov [22]
  - Women's Singles: (Italy) Francesca Schiavone [7], (Russia) Svetlana Kuznetsova [15], (Serbia) Ana Ivanovic [16]
  - Men's Doubles: (France) Michaël Llodra / (Serbia) Nenad Zimonjić [3]
  - Women's Doubles: (Argentina) Gisela Dulko / (Italy) Flavia Pennetta [2], (Spain) María José Martínez Sánchez / (Spain) Anabel Medina Garrigues [12]

Matches on main courts
Event	Winner	Loser	Score
Matches on Arthur Ashe Stadium
Women's Singles 4th Round	(Russia) Anastasia Pavlyuchenkova [17]	(Italy) Francesca Schiavone [7]	5–7, 6–3, 6–4
Women's Singles 4th Round	(United States) Serena Williams [28]	(Serbia) Ana Ivanovic [16]	6–3, 6–4
Men's Singles 4th Round	(France) Jo-Wilfried Tsonga [11]	(United States) Mardy Fish [8]	6–4, 6–7^{(5–7)}, 3–6, 6–4, 6–2
Women's Singles 4th Round	(Denmark) Caroline Wozniacki [1]	(Russia) Svetlana Kuznetsova [15]	6–7^{(6–8)}, 7–5, 6–1
Men's Singles 4th Round	(Switzerland) Roger Federer [3]	(Argentina) Juan Mónaco	6–1, 6–2, 6–0
Matches on Louis Armstrong Stadium
Men's Singles 4th Round	(Serbia) Janko Tipsarević [20]	(Spain) Juan Carlos Ferrero	7–5, 6–7^{(3–7)}, 7–5, 6–2
Men's Singles 4th Round	(Serbia) Novak Djokovic [1]	(Ukraine) Alexandr Dolgopolov [22]	7–6^{(16–14)}, 6–4, 6–2
Women's Singles 4th Round	(Germany) Andrea Petkovic [10]	(Spain) Carla Suárez Navarro	6–1, 6–4
Matches on the Grandstand
Women's Doubles 3rd Round	(Italy) Sara Errani [15] (Italy) Roberta Vinci [15]	(Argentina) Gisela Dulko [2] (Italy) Flavia Pennetta [2]	4–6, 7–5, 6–2
Men's Doubles 3rd Round	(India) Mahesh Bhupathi [4] (India) Leander Paes [4]	(India) Somdev Devvarman (Philippines) Treat Conrad Huey	6–4, 7–5
Mixed Doubles Quarterfinals	(Argentina) Gisela Dulko [8] (Argentina) Eduardo Schwank [8]	(Australia) Jarmila Gajdošová (Brazil) Bruno Soares	3–6, 6–3, [10–8]
Men's Doubles 3rd Round	(Spain) David Marrero (Italy) Andreas Seppi	(France) Michaël Llodra [3] (Serbia) Nenad Zimonjić [3]	7–6^{(7–4)}, 6–4
Colored background indicates a night match

== Day 9 (September 6) ==
All the matches that should have been played this day were postponed due to the continued rain.

- Schedule of Play

== Day 10 (September 7) ==
Due to the rainy weather forecast, the Day 10 day and night sessions have been cancelled. Play will resume on Day 11 (8 September), weather permitting.

- Schedule of Play

== Day 11 (September 8) ==
- Schedule of Play
- Seeds out:
  - Men's Singles: (Spain) David Ferrer [5], (France) Jo-Wilfried Tsonga [11], (France) Gilles Simon [12], (Serbia) Janko Tipsarević [20]
  - Women's Singles: (Russia) Vera Zvonareva [2], (Germany) Andrea Petkovic [10], (Russia) Anastasia Pavlyuchenkova [17], (Italy) Flavia Pennetta [26]
  - Men's Doubles: (India) Mahesh Bhupathi / (India) Leander Paes [4], (Sweden) Robert Lindstedt / (Romania) Horia Tecău [7]
  - Women's Doubles: (Czech Republic) Květa Peschke / (Slovenia) Katarina Srebotnik [1], (Czech Republic) Andrea Hlaváčková / (Czech Republic) Lucie Hradecká [8], (Czech Republic) Iveta Benešová / (Czech Republic) Barbora Záhlavová-Strýcová [9], (Italy) Sara Errani / (Italy) Roberta Vinci [15]
  - Mixed Doubles: (Russia) Elena Vesnina / (India) Leander Paes [7]

Matches on main courts
Event	Winner	Loser	Score
Matches on Arthur Ashe Stadium
Men's Singles 4th Round	(Spain) Rafael Nadal [2]	(Luxembourg) Gilles Müller	7–6^{(7–1)}, 6–1, 6–2
Women's Singles Quarterfinals	(United States) Serena Williams [28]	(Russia) Anastasia Pavlyuchenkova [17]	7–5, 6–1
Men's Singles Quarterfinals	(Serbia) Novak Djokovic [1]	(Serbia) Janko Tipsarević [20]	7–6^{(7–2)}, 6–7^{(3–7)}, 6–0, 3–0, retired
Men's Singles Quarterfinals	(Switzerland) Roger Federer [3]	(France) Jo-Wilfried Tsonga [11]	6–4, 6–3, 6–3
Matches on the Grandstand
Men's Singles 4th Round	(United Kingdom) Andy Murray [4]	(United States) Donald Young [WC]	6–2, 6–3, 6–3
Women's Singles Quarterfinals	(Australia) Samantha Stosur [9]	(Russia) Vera Zvonareva [2]	6–3, 6–3
Mixed Doubles Semifinals	(United States) Melanie Oudin [WC] (United States) Jack Sock [WC]	(Russia) Elena Vesnina [7] (India) Leander Paes [7]	walkover
Women's Doubles Quarterfinals	(Slovakia) Daniela Hantuchová (Poland) Agnieszka Radwańska	(Italy) Sara Errani [15] (Italy) Roberta Vinci [15]	6–3, 7–6^{(7–3)}
Colored background indicates a night match

== Day 12 (September 9) ==
- Schedule of Play
- Seeds out:
  - Men's Singles: (United States) John Isner [28], (United States) Andy Roddick [21]
  - Men's Doubles: (India) Rohan Bopanna / (Pakistan) Aisam-ul-Haq Qureshi [5]
  - Women's Doubles: (Russia) Maria Kirilenko / (Russia) Nadia Petrova [5]
  - Mixed Doubles: (Argentina) Gisela Dulko / (Argentina) Eduardo Schwank [8]

Matches on main courts
Event	Winner	Loser	Score
Matches on Arthur Ashe Stadium
Men's Singles Quarterfinals	(United Kingdom) Andy Murray [4]	(United States) John Isner [28]	7–5, 6–4, 3–6, 7–6^{(7–2)}
Men's Singles Quarterfinals	(Spain) Rafael Nadal [2]	(United States) Andy Roddick [21]	6–2, 6–1, 6–3
Mixed Doubles Final	(United States) Melanie Oudin [WC] (United States) Jack Sock [WC]	(Argentina) Gisela Dulko [8] (Argentina) Eduardo Schwank [8]	7–6^{(7–4)}, 4–6, [10–8]
Matches on the Grandstand
Men's Doubles Semifinals	(Austria) Jürgen Melzer [9] (Germany) Philipp Petzschner [9]	(Italy) Simone Bolelli (Italy) Fabio Fognini	6–4, 6–7^{(3–7)}, 6–1
Women's Doubles Semifinals	(United States) Liezel Huber [4] (United States) Lisa Raymond [4]	(Slovakia) Daniela Hantuchová (Poland) Agnieszka Radwańska	6–2, 6–4
Men's Doubles Semifinals	(Poland) Mariusz Fyrstenberg [6] (Poland) Marcin Matkowski [6]	(India) Rohan Bopanna [5] (Pakistan) Aisam-ul-Haq Qureshi [5]	6–2, 7–6^{(7–4)}
Women's Doubles Semifinals	(United States) Vania King [3] (Kazakhstan) Yaroslava Shvedova [3]	(Russia) Maria Kirilenko [5] (Russia) Nadia Petrova [5]	7–6^{(9–7)}, 2–6, 6–3
Colored background indicates a night match

== Day 13 (September 10) ==
- Schedule of Play
- Seeds out:
  - Men's Singles: (Switzerland) Roger Federer [3], (United Kingdom) Andy Murray [4]
  - Women's Singles: (Denmark) Caroline Wozniacki [1]
  - Men's Doubles: (Poland) Mariusz Fyrstenberg / (Poland) Marcin Matkowski [6]

Matches on main courts
Event	Winner	Loser	Score
Matches on Arthur Ashe Stadium
Men's Singles Semifinals	(Serbia) Novak Djokovic [1]	(Switzerland) Roger Federer [3]	6–7^{(7–9)}, 4–6, 6–3, 6–2, 7–5
Men's Singles Semifinals	(Spain) Rafael Nadal [2]	(United Kingdom) Andy Murray [4]	6–4, 6–2, 3–6, 6–2
Women's Singles Semifinals	(United States) Serena Williams [28]	(Denmark) Caroline Wozniacki [1]	6–2, 6–4
Men's Doubles Final	(Austria) Jürgen Melzer [9] (Germany) Philipp Petzschner [9]	(Poland) Mariusz Fyrstenberg [6] (Poland) Marcin Matkowski [6]	6–2, 6–2
Matches on the Grandstand
Women's Singles Semifinals	(Australia) Samantha Stosur [9]	(Germany) Angelique Kerber	6–3, 2–6, 6–2
Colored background indicates a night match

== Day 14 (September 11) ==
In remembrance of the September 11 attacks, the United States Tennis Association (USTA) and the US Open have, among other things, painted the digits "9/11/01" on Arthur Ashe Stadium two days in advance of Day 14's scheduled women's final. The players at the US Open have also been given a white US Open cap with the digits "9/11/01" in black block figures on the side of the cap. For the men's final originally scheduled for 11 September, the USTA had planned for the finalists to walk through a path lined by an honor guard of New York police officers, firefighters, and Port Authority police. The USTA also had planned for the men's final a moment of silence, a military flyover, and the unfurling of a court-sized U.S. flag at Arthur Ashe Stadium, and these events were remain as part of the women's final. Cyndi Lauper contributed by singing the national anthem at the Williams–Wozniacki semifinal match on September 10, and Queen Latifah did the same at the women's final, the Williams–Stosur match.

- Schedule of Play
- Seeds out:
  - Women's Singles: (United States) Serena Williams [28]
  - Women's Doubles: (United States) Vania King [3] / (Kazakhstan) Yaroslava Shvedova [3]

Matches on main courts
Event	Winner	Loser	Score
Matches on Arthur Ashe Stadium
Women's Doubles Final	(United States) Liezel Huber [4] (United States) Lisa Raymond [4]	(United States) Vania King [3] (Kazakhstan) Yaroslava Shvedova [3]	4–6, 7–6^{(7–5)}, 7–6^{(7–3)}
Women's Singles Final	(Australia) Samantha Stosur [9]	(United States) Serena Williams [28]	6–2, 6–3

== Day 15 (September 12) ==
- Schedule of Play
- Seeds out:
  - Men's Singles: (Spain) Rafael Nadal [2]

Matches on main courts
Event	Winner	Loser	Score
Matches on Arthur Ashe Stadium
Men's Singles Final	(Serbia) Novak Djokovic [1]	(Spain) Rafael Nadal [2]	6–2, 6–4, 6–7^{(3–7)}, 6–1
