= 2011 US Open (tennis) =

Tennis tournament

- Date: August 29 – September 12
- Edition: 131st
- Category: Grand Slam (ITF)
- Surface: Hardcourt
- Location: New York City, U.S.
- Venue: USTA Billie Jean King National Tennis Center

Champions

Men's singles
- (Serbia) Novak Djokovic

Women's singles
- (Australia) Samantha Stosur

Men's doubles
- (Austria) Jürgen Melzer / (Germany) Philipp Petzschner

Women's doubles
- (United States) Liezel Huber / (United States) Lisa Raymond

Mixed doubles
- (United States) Melanie Oudin / (United States) Jack Sock

Wheelchair men's singles
- (Japan) Shingo Kunieda

Wheelchair women's singles
- (Netherlands) Esther Vergeer

Wheelchair quad singles
- (United States) David Wagner

Wheelchair men's doubles
- (France) Stéphane Houdet / (France) Nicolas Peifer

Wheelchair women's doubles
- (Netherlands) Esther Vergeer / (Netherlands) Sharon Walraven

Wheelchair quad doubles
- (United States) Nick Taylor / (United States) David Wagner

Boys' singles
- (United Kingdom) Oliver Golding

Girls' singles
- (United States) Grace Min

Boys' doubles
- (Germany) Robin Kern / (Germany) Julian Lenz

Girls' doubles
- (Russia) Irina Khromacheva / (Netherlands) Demi Schuurs
- US Open

The 2011 US Open was a tennis tournament played on the outdoor hard courts at the Billie Jean King National Tennis Center in Flushing Meadows Park, of Queens, New York City, United States. It began on August 29 and was originally scheduled to end on September 11, but the men's final was postponed to September 12 due to rain.

Rafael Nadal and Kim Clijsters were the defending champions. Due to an abdominal muscle injury, Clijsters opted not to defend her title.

In the women's singles, Australia's Samantha Stosur defeated Serena Williams in straight sets 6–2, 6–3 for her first Grand Slam title. Stosur thus became the first Australian female player to win a Grand Slam since Evonne Goolagong Cawley in 1980.

In the men's singles, both Nadal and Novak Djokovic played the final for the second consecutive year. This time, Djokovic won 6–2, 6–4, 6–7^{(3–7)}, 6–1 for his first US Open title.

== Points and prize money ==
=== Point distribution ===
Below is a series of tables for each of the competitions showing the ranking points on offer for each event.

==== Seniors points ====
| Stage | Men's singles | Men's doubles | Women's singles | Women's doubles |
|---|---|---|---|---|
| Champion | 2000 | | | |
| Runner up | 1200 | | 1400 | |
| Semifinals | 720 | | 900 | |
| Quarterfinals | 360 | | 500 | |
| Round of 16 | 180 | | 280 | |
| Round of 32 | 90 | | 160 | |
| Round of 64 | 45 | 0 | 100 | 5 |
| Round of 128 | 10 | – | 5 | – |
| Qualifier | 25 | – | 60 | – |
| Qualifying 3rd round | 16 | – | 50 | – |
| Qualifying 2nd round | 8 | – | 40 | – |
| Qualifying 1st round | 0 | – | 2 | – |

==== Junior points ====
| Stage | Boys singles | Boys doubles | Girls singles | Girls doubles |
|---|---|---|---|---|
| Champion | 250 | 180 | 250 | 180 |
| Runner up | 180 | 120 | 180 | 120 |
| Semifinals | 120 | 80 | 120 | 80 |
| Quarterfinals | 80 | 50 | 80 | 50 |
| Round of 16 | 50 | 30 | 50 | 30 |
| Round of 32 | 30 | – | 30 | – |
| Qualifier who loses in first round | 25 | – | 25 | – |
| Qualifying final round | 20 | – | 20 | – |

==== Wheelchair points ====
| Stage | Men's singles | Women's singles | Quad singles | Men's doubles | Women's singles | Quad doubles |
|---|---|---|---|---|---|---|
| Champion | 800 | | | | | |
| Runner up | 500 | | | | | 100 |
| Semifinals/3rd | 375 | | | 100 | | – |
| Quarterfinals/4th | 100 | | | – | | |

=== Prize money ===
The USTA announced that the 2011 US Open purse has increased by more than one million dollars to reach a record $23.7 million. In addition to the base purse of $23.7 million, the top three men's and top three women's finishers in the Olympus US Open Series may earn up to an additional $2.6 million in bonus prize money at the US Open, providing a potential total payout of $26.3 million. Both the men's and women's US Open singles champions will earn a record $1.8 million with the ability to earn an additional $1 million in bonus prize money (for a total $2.8 million potential payout) based on their performances in the Olympus US Open Series. Below is the list of prize money given to each player in the main draw of the professional competitions; all prize money is in U.S. dollars (US$); doubles prize money is distributed per pair.

| 2011 US Open finish | Men's and women's singles | Men's and women's doubles | Mixed doubles |
|---|---|---|---|
| Champion | $1,800,000 | $420,000 | $150,000 |
| Finalist | $900,000 | $210,000 | $70,000 |
| Semifinalist | $450,000 | $105,000 | $30,000 |
| Quarterfinalist | $225,000 | $50,000 | $15,000 |
| Round of 16 | $110,000 | $25,000 | $10,000 |
| Round of 32 | $55,000 | $15,000 | $5,000 |
| Round of 64 | $31,000 | $10,000 | – |
| Round of 128 | $19,000 | – | – |
| Qualifying competition | $8,000 | – | – |
| 2nd round qualifying | $5,625 | – | – |
| 1st round qualifying | $3,000 | – | – |

=== Bonus prize money ===
| 2011 US Open finish | 2011 Olympus US Open series finish | | | | | |
| 2011 US Open finish | 1st place | | 2nd place | | 3rd place | |
|---|---|---|---|---|---|---|
| Champion | $1,000,000 | | $500,000 | | $250,000 | |
| Finalist | $500,000 | | $250,000 | | $125,000 | |
| Semifinalist | $250,000 | | $125,000 | | $62,500 | |
| Quarterfinalist | $125,000 | | $62,500 | | $31,250 | |
| Round of 16 | $70,000 | | $35,000 | | $17,500 | |
| Round of 32 | $40,000 | | $20,000 | | $10,000 | |
| Round of 64 | $25,000 | | $12,500 | | $6,250 | |
| Round of 128 | $15,000 | | $7,500 | | $3,750 | |
| Awardees | (United States) Mardy Fish | $70,000 | (Serbia) Novak Djokovic | $500,000 | (United States) John Isner | $31,250 |
| Awardees | (United States) Serena Williams | $500,000 | (Poland) Agnieszka Radwańska | $12,500 | (Russia) Maria Sharapova | $10,000 |

== Singles players ==
Men's singles

| Champion | | Runner-up | |
|---|---|---|---|
| (Serbia) Novak Djokovic [1] | | (Spain) Rafael Nadal [2] | |
Semifinals out
| (Switzerland) Roger Federer [3] | | (United Kingdom) Andy Murray [4] | |
Quarterfinals out
| (Serbia) Janko Tipsarević [20] | (France) Jo-Wilfried Tsonga [11] | (United States) John Isner [28] | (United States) Andy Roddick [21] |
4th round out
| (Ukraine) Alexandr Dolgopolov [22] | (Spain) Juan Carlos Ferrero | (United States) Mardy Fish [8] | (Argentina) Juan Mónaco |
| (France) Gilles Simon [12] | (United States) Donald Young (WC) | (Spain) David Ferrer [5] | (Luxembourg) Gilles Müller |
3rd round out
| (Russia) Nikolay Davydenko | (Croatia) Ivo Karlović (PR) | (Czech Republic) Tomáš Berdych [9] | (Spain) Marcel Granollers [31] |
| (Croatia) Marin Čilić [27] | (Germany) Tommy Haas (PR) | (Spain) Fernando Verdasco [19] | (South Africa) Kevin Anderson |
| (United States) Alex Bogomolov Jr. | (Argentina) Juan Martín del Potro [18] | (Argentina) Juan Ignacio Chela [24] | (Spain) Feliciano López [25] |
| (Germany) Florian Mayer [26] | (France) Julien Benneteau (WC) | (Russia) Igor Kunitsyn | (Argentina) David Nalbandian |
2nd round out
| (Argentina) Carlos Berlocq | (Italy) Potito Starace | (Italy) Flavio Cipolla | (France) Richard Gasquet [13] |
| (Italy) Fabio Fognini | (Germany) Philipp Petzschner | (Kazakhstan) Mikhail Kukushkin | (France) Gaël Monfils [7] |
| (Israel) Dudi Sela | (Australia) Bernard Tomic | (Czech Republic) Radek Štěpánek [23] | (Colombia) Alejandro Falla |
| (Ukraine) Sergei Bubka (Q) | (Turkey) Marsel İlhan (Q) | (France) Michaël Llodra [29] | (Tunisia) Malek Jaziri (Q) |
| (Brazil) Rogério Dutra Da Silva (LL) | (United States) Robby Ginepri (WC) | (Argentina) Diego Junqueira | (Spain) Guillermo García López |
| (Switzerland) Stanislas Wawrinka [14] | (Belgium) Steve Darcis | (Canada) Vasek Pospisil (Q) | (Netherlands) Robin Haase |
| (United States) James Blake | (Monaco) Jean-René Lisnard (Q) | (United States) Jack Sock (WC) | (Uzbekistan) Denis Istomin |
| (Latvia) Ernests Gulbis | (Austria) Jürgen Melzer [17] | (Croatia) Ivan Ljubičić [30] | (France) Nicolas Mahut |
1st round out
| (Republic of Ireland) Conor Niland (Q) | (Spain) Pere Riba | (Germany) Michael Berrer | (Croatia) Ivan Dodig [32] |
| (Portugal) Frederico Gil | (Japan) Kei Nishikori | (Chile) Fernando González (PR) | (Ukraine) Sergiy Stakhovsky |
| (France) Romain Jouan (Q) | (Argentina) Horacio Zeballos | (Spain) Albert Ramos | (France) Augustin Gensse (Q) |
| (Belgium) Xavier Malisse | (Spain) Albert Montañés | (Spain) Pablo Andújar | (Bulgaria) Grigor Dimitrov |
| (Colombia) Santiago Giraldo | (Brazil) Thomaz Bellucci | (United States) Michael Yani (Q) | (United States) Ryan Harrison (WC) |
| (Germany) Philipp Kohlschreiber | (Italy) Andreas Seppi | (France) Jonathan Dasnières de Veigy (Q) | (Serbia) Viktor Troicki [15] |
| (Chinese Taipei) Lu Yen-hsun | (Austria) Andreas Haider-Maurer | (Canada) Frank Dancevic (Q) | (Finland) Jarkko Nieminen |
| (Romania) Victor Hănescu | (Japan) Go Soeda (Q) | (Netherlands) Thiemo de Bakker | (Germany) Tobias Kamke |
| (Republic of Ireland) Louk Sorensen (Q) | (United States) Steve Johnson (WC) | (Brazil) João Souza (Q) | (Cyprus) Marcos Baghdatis |
| (Italy) Filippo Volandri | (Slovakia) Karol Beck | (Spain) Daniel Gimeno Traver | (Brazil) Ricardo Mello |
| (Argentina) Máximo González | (Slovakia) Lukáš Lacko (LL) | (Russia) Dmitry Tursunov | (Australia) Marinko Matosevic (WC) |
| (Japan) Tatsuma Ito | (Czech Republic) Lukáš Rosol | (Portugal) Rui Machado | (India) Somdev Devvarman |
| (Russia) Igor Andreev | (Netherlands) Jesse Huta Galung (Q) | (Belgium) Olivier Rochus | (France) Adrian Mannarino |
| (United States) Michael Russell | (France) Marc Gicquel | (United States) Ryan Sweeting | (Spain) Nicolás Almagro [10] |
| (Russia) Mikhail Youzhny [16] | (France) Édouard Roger-Vasselin | (Germany) Matthias Bachinger | (France) Éric Prodon |
| (Slovenia) Blaž Kavčič | (United States) Bobby Reynolds (WC) | (Colombia) Robert Farah (Q) | (Kazakhstan) Andrey Golubev |

Women's singles

| Champion | | Runner-up | |
|---|---|---|---|
| (Australia) Samantha Stosur [9] | | (United States) Serena Williams [28]/(PR) | |
Semifinals out
| (Denmark) Caroline Wozniacki [1] | | (Germany) Angelique Kerber | |
Quarterfinals out
| (Germany) Andrea Petkovic [10] | (Russia) Anastasia Pavlyuchenkova [17] | (Italy) Flavia Pennetta [26] | (Russia) Vera Zvonareva [2] |
4th round out
| (Russia) Svetlana Kuznetsova [15] | (Spain) Carla Suárez Navarro | (Serbia) Ana Ivanovic [16] | (Italy) Francesca Schiavone [7] |
| (Romania) Monica Niculescu | (China) Peng Shuai [13] | (Russia) Maria Kirilenko [25] | (Germany) Sabine Lisicki [22] |
3rd round out
| (United States) Vania King | (Uzbekistan) Akgul Amanmuradova | (Italy) Roberta Vinci [18] | (Spain) Sílvia Soler Espinosa (Q) |
| (Belarus) Victoria Azarenka [4] | (United States) Sloane Stephens (WC) | (Serbia) Jelena Janković [11] | (South Africa) Chanelle Scheepers |
| (Czech Republic) Lucie Šafářová [27] | (Russia) Alla Kudryavtseva | (Germany) Julia Görges [19] | (Russia) Maria Sharapova [3] |
| (United States) Christina McHale | (Russia) Nadia Petrova [24] | (United States) Irina Falconi | (Spain) Anabel Medina Garrigues [30] |
2nd round out
| (Netherlands) Arantxa Rus | (Australia) Jarmila Gajdošová [29] | (France) Pauline Parmentier | (United Kingdom) Elena Baltacha |
| (China) Zheng Jie | (France) Alizé Cornet | (Estonia) Kaia Kanepi [31] | (Romania) Simona Halep |
| (Argentina) Gisela Dulko | (Netherlands) Michaëlla Krajicek (Q) | (Israel) Shahar Pe'er [23] | (Czech Republic) Petra Cetkovská |
| (Australia) Jelena Dokić | (Croatia) Petra Martić | (Germany) Mona Barthel | (Croatia) Mirjana Lučić |
| (Romania) Alexandra Dulgheru | (United States) Madison Keys (WC) | (Belgium) Yanina Wickmayer [20] | (Poland) Agnieszka Radwańska [12] |
| (Bulgaria) Tsvetana Pironkova | (Spain) Laura Pous Tió | (Italy) Romina Oprandi (Q) | (Belarus) Anastasiya Yakimova |
| (France) Marion Bartoli [8] | (Russia) Vera Dushevina | (Slovenia) Polona Hercog | (United States) CoCo Vandeweghe |
| (Slovakia) Dominika Cibulková [14] | (United States) Venus Williams | (United Kingdom) Laura Robson (Q) | (Ukraine) Kateryna Bondarenko |
1st round out
| (Spain) Nuria Llagostera Vives | (Russia) Elena Vesnina | (Hungary) Gréta Arn | (Czech Republic) Iveta Benešová |
| (Slovakia) Daniela Hantuchová [21] | (Austria) Tamira Paszek | (United States) Jamie Hampton (WC) | (Italy) Sara Errani |
| (Russia) Ekaterina Bychkova (Q) | (Russia) Vitalia Diatchenko (Q) | (Australia) Casey Dellacqua (WC) | (Romania) Irina-Camelia Begu |
| (Thailand) Tamarine Tanasugarn | (Japan) Kimiko Date-Krumm | (France) Mathilde Johansson | (China) Li Na [6] |
| (Sweden) Johanna Larsson | (Canada) Rebecca Marino | (Greece) Eleni Daniilidou | (Serbia) Bojana Jovanovski |
| (India) Sania Mirza | (Hungary) Réka-Luca Jani | (Russia) Evgeniya Rodina | (Russia) Ksenia Pervak |
| (United States) Alison Riske (WC) | (Belarus) Olga Govortsova | (Czech Republic) Barbora Záhlavová-Strýcová | (Georgia (country)) Anna Tatishvili |
| (Spain) María José Martínez Sánchez [32] | (United Kingdom) Anne Keothavong | (New Zealand) Marina Erakovic (Q) | (Kazakhstan) Galina Voskoboeva (Q) |
| (Czech Republic) Petra Kvitová [5] | (Austria) Patricia Mayr-Achleitner | (United States) Jill Craybas (WC) | (Slovakia) Magdaléna Rybáriková |
| (Romania) Sorana Cîrstea | (Australia) Anastasia Rodionova | (United States) Lauren Davis (WC) | (Poland) Urszula Radwańska (Q) |
| (United States) Varvara Lepchenko | (France) Virginie Razzano | (Japan) Misaki Doi | (Germany) Kristina Barrois |
| (France) Aravane Rezaï (WC) | (United States) Melanie Oudin | (Thailand) Noppawan Lertcheewakarn (Q) | (United Kingdom) Heather Watson |
| (Russia) Alexandra Panova (Q) | (Canada) Aleksandra Wozniak (Q) | (Latvia) Anastasija Sevastova | (Russia) Ekaterina Makarova |
| (Chinese Taipei) Yung-jan Chan (Q) | (United States) Bethanie Mattek-Sands | (Italy) Alberta Brianti | (Sweden) Sofia Arvidsson |
| (China) Zhang Shuai | (Czech Republic) Klára Zakopalová | (Russia) Vesna Dolonts | (Ukraine) Alona Bondarenko (PR) |
| (Italy) Karin Knapp (Q) | (Japan) Ayumi Morita | (Czech Republic) Lucie Hradecká | (France) Stéphanie Foretz Gacon (Q) |

== Player(s) of the day ==
- Day 1: (United States) Madison Keys – The 16-year-old Keys defeated her compatriot and elder by 21 years, Jill Craybas on the Grandstand with a 6–2, 6–4 score in their first-round encounter, giving the Florida native her first-ever win at the US Open.
- Day 2: (Romania) Simona Halep – Halep, the 19-year-old world number 53, defeated the reigning French Open champion and sixth seed Li Na at Louis Armstrong Stadium with a 6–2, 7–5 score in their first round encounter.
- Day 3: (France) Julien Benneteau – The French wild-card upset tenth-seeded Spaniard Nicolás Almagro in straight sets.
- Day 4: (Spain) Juan Carlos Ferrero – The unseeded Ferrero, an experienced ATP Tour player and the second oldest man in the draw at 31 years old, defeated seventh-seeded Gaël Monfils in an extraordinary five-set match to advance into the third round.
- Day 5: (Italy) Flavia Pennetta – The twenty-sixth seed, two-time quarterfinalist, and former world number 10 upset third seed, 2006 US Open champion, and former world number 1 Maria Sharapova in three sets, 6–3, 3–6, 6–4, to advance to the fourth round.
- Day 6: (Italy) Francesca Schiavone – The 31-year-old seventh seed saved a match point in her battle against world number 81 Chanelle Scheepers, and went on to win, 5–7, 7–6, 6–3, advancing to the fourth round.
- Day 7: (United States) Donald Young – The 22-year-old American wildcard upset twenty-fourth seeded veteran Juan Ignacio Chela in the third round in straight sets with a score of 7–5, 6–4, 6–3. He made it to the fourth round of a Grand Slam for the first time in his career after upsetting Chela and the fourteenth seeded Stanislas Wawrinka in the second round.
- Day 8: (Russia) Anastasia Pavlyuchenkova – The seventeenth-seeded Russian reached her second quarterfinal this year after upsetting seventh seed Francesca Schiavone in three tight sets, 5–7, 6–3, 6–4.
- Day 9: No matches completed due to rain.
- Day 10: No matches completed due to rain.
- Day 11: (United States) John Isner – The twenty-eighth seeded American upset twelfth-seeded Frenchman Gilles Simon, 7–6, 3–6, 7–6, 7–6, to reach his first ever Grand Slam quarterfinal.
- Day 12: (Spain) Rafael Nadal – The number two seed reached his fourth consecutive US Open semifinal after defeating American Andy Roddick in straight sets, 6–2, 6–1, 6–3, in under two hours.
- Day 13: (Australia) Samantha Stosur – The number nine seed became the first Australian woman since Wendy Turnbull in 1977 to reach a US Open final, after defeating unseeded German Angelique Kerber in three sets in her semifinal match, 6–3, 2–6, 6–2.
- Day 14: (Australia) Samantha Stosur – The Australian player upset the American US Open three-time champion Serena Williams in straight sets, 6–2, 6–3, winning her first Major.
- Day 15: (Serbia) Novak Djokovic – The Serbian player continued his amazing season by winning his first US Open and his third Grand Slam of the year, defeating the defending champion Rafael Nadal for the sixth time in 2011.

== Events ==
=== Seniors ===
==== Men's singles ====
(Serbia) Novak Djokovic defeated (Spain) Rafael Nadal, 6–2, 6–4, 6–7^{(3–7)}, 6–1

- It was Djokovic's 10th title of the year and 28th of his career. It was his 3rd Grand Slam title of the year and 4th of his career. It was his first U.S. Open title.

==== Women's singles ====
(Australia) Samantha Stosur defeated (United States) Serena Williams, 6–2, 6–3

- It was Stosur's 1st title of the year and 3rd of her career. It was her first (and only) Grand Slam title.

==== Men's doubles ====
(Austria) Jürgen Melzer / (Germany) Philipp Petzschner defeated (Poland) Mariusz Fyrstenberg / (Poland) Marcin Matkowski, 6–2, 6–2

==== Women's doubles ====
(United States) Liezel Huber / (United States) Lisa Raymond defeated (United States) Vania King / (Kazakhstan) Yaroslava Shvedova, 4–6, 7–6^{(7–5)}, 7–6^{(7–3)}

- Huber and Raymond won their first US Open title as a doubles pair.

==== Mixed doubles ====
(United States) Melanie Oudin / (United States) Jack Sock defeated (Argentina) Gisela Dulko / (Argentina) Eduardo Schwank, 7–6^{(7–4)}, 4–6, [10–8]

- Oudin and Sock became the 12th unseeded team to win a title in the history of the US Open.

=== Juniors ===
==== Boys' singles ====
(United Kingdom) Oliver Golding defeated (Czech Republic) Jiří Veselý, 5–7, 6–3, 6–4

==== Girls' singles ====
(United States) Grace Min defeated (France) Caroline Garcia, 7–5, 7–6^{(7–3)}

==== Boys' doubles ====
(Germany) Robin Kern / (Germany) Julian Lenz defeated (Moldova) Maxim Dubarenco / (Ukraine) Vladyslav Manafov, 7–5, 6–4

==== Girls' doubles ====
(Russia) Irina Khromacheva / (Netherlands) Demi Schuurs defeated (United States) Gabrielle Andrews / (United States) Taylor Townsend, 6–4, 5–7, [10–5]

=== Wheelchair events ===
==== Wheelchair men's singles ====
(Japan) Shingo Kunieda defeated (France) Stéphane Houdet, 3–6, 6–1, 6–0

- Kunieda defended his title and won his fourth US Open title.

==== Wheelchair women's singles ====
(Netherlands) Esther Vergeer defeated (Netherlands) Aniek van Koot, 6–2, 6–1

- Vergeer defended her title, extended her winning streak, and earned her sixth US Open title.

==== Wheelchair quad singles ====
(United States) David Wagner defeated (United Kingdom) Peter Norfolk, 7–5, 3–1 retired

- Wagner defended his title and won his second US Open title.

==== Wheelchair men's doubles ====
(France) Stéphane Houdet / (France) Nicolas Peifer defeated (Netherlands) Maikel Scheffers / (Netherlands) Ronald Vink, 6–3, 6–1

==== Wheelchair women's doubles ====
(Netherlands) Esther Vergeer / (Netherlands) Sharon Walraven defeated (Netherlands) Jiske Griffioen / (Netherlands) Aniek van Koot, 7–5, 6–7^{(8–10)}, 6–4

==== Wheelchair quad doubles ====
(United States) David Wagner / (United States) Nick Taylor defeated (United Kingdom) Peter Norfolk / (Israel) Noam Gershony, walkover

== Singles seeds ==
The following are the seeded players and notable players who withdrew from the event. Rankings are as of August 22.

=== Men's singles ===
| Seed | Rank | Player | Points | Points defending | Points won | New points | Status |
|---|---|---|---|---|---|---|---|
| 1 | 1 | (Serbia) Novak Djokovic | 13,920 | 1,200 | 2,000 | 14,720 | Champion, defeated (Spain) Rafael Nadal [2] |
| 2 | 2 | (Spain) Rafael Nadal | 11,420 | 2,000 | 1,200 | 10,620 | Runner-up; Final lost to (Serbia) Novak Djokovic [1] |
| 3 | 3 | (Switzerland) Roger Federer | 8,380 | 720 | 720 | 8,380 | Semifinals lost to (Serbia) Novak Djokovic [1] |
| 4 | 4 | (United Kingdom) Andy Murray | 6,535 | 90 | 720 | 7,165 | Semifinals lost to (Spain) Rafael Nadal [2] |
| 5 | 5 | (Spain) David Ferrer | 4,200 | 180 | 180 | 4,200 | Fourth round lost to (United States) Andy Roddick [21] |
| ~~6~~ | ~~6~~ | (Sweden) ~~Robin Söderling~~ | 4,145 | 360 | 0 | 3,785 | Withdrew due to illness |
| 7 | 7 | (France) Gaël Monfils | 3,165 | 360 | 45 | 2,850 | Second round lost to (Spain) Juan Carlos Ferrero |
| 8 | 8 | (United States) Mardy Fish | 2,820 | 180 | 180 | 2,820 | Fourth round lost to (France) Jo-Wilfried Tsonga [11] |
| 9 | 9 | (Czech Republic) Tomáš Berdych | 2,690 | 10 | 90 | 2,770 | Third round lost to (Serbia) Janko Tipsarević [20] |
| 10 | 10 | (Spain) Nicolás Almagro | 2,380 | 90 | 10 | 2,300 | First round lost to (France) Julien Benneteau [WC] |
| 11 | 11 | (France) Jo-Wilfried Tsonga | 2,350 | 0 | 360 | 2,710 | Quarterfinals lost to (Switzerland) Roger Federer [3] |
| 12 | 12 | (France) Gilles Simon | 2,325 | 90 | 180 | 2,415 | Fourth round lost to (United States) John Isner [28] |
| 13 | 13 | (France) Richard Gasquet | 2,080 | 180 | 45 | 1,945 | Second round lost to (Croatia) Ivo Karlović [PR] |
| 14 | 14 | (Switzerland) Stanislas Wawrinka | 2,035 | 360 | 45 | 1,720 | Second round lost to (United States) Donald Young [WC] |
| 15 | 15 | (Serbia) Viktor Troicki | 1,935 | 10 | 10 | 1,935 | First round lost to (Colombia) Alejandro Falla |
| 16 | 16 | (Russia) Mikhail Youzhny | 1,955 | 720 | 10 | 1,245 | First round lost to (Latvia) Ernests Gulbis |
| 17 | 17 | (Austria) Jürgen Melzer | 1,830 | 180 | 45 | 1,695 | Second round lost to (Russia) Igor Kunitsyn |
| 18 | 18 | (Argentina) Juan Martín del Potro | 1,800 | 0 | 90 | 1,890 | Third round lost to (France) Gilles Simon [12] |
| 19 | 19 | (Spain) Fernando Verdasco | 1,785 | 360 | 90 | 1,515 | Third round lost to (France) Jo-Wilfried Tsonga [11] |
| 20 | 20 | (Serbia) Janko Tipsarević | 1,740 | 90 | 360 | 2,010 | Quarterfinals lost to (Serbia) Novak Djokovic [1] |
| 21 | 21 | (United States) Andy Roddick | 1,680 | 45 | 360 | 1,995 | Quarterfinals lost to (Spain) Rafael Nadal [2] |
| 22 | 22 | (Ukraine) Alexandr Dolgopolov | 1,530 | 10 | 180 | 1,700 | Fourth round lost to (Serbia) Novak Djokovic [1] |
| 23 | 23 | (Czech Republic) Radek Štěpánek | 1,440 | 10 | 45 | 1,475 | Second round lost to (Argentina) Juan Mónaco |
| 24 | 24 | (Argentina) Juan Ignacio Chela | 1,440 | 45 | 90 | 1,485 | Third round lost to (United States) Donald Young [WC] |
| 25 | 25 | (Spain) Feliciano López | 1,415 | 180 | 90 | 1,325 | Third round lost to (United Kingdom) Andy Murray [4] |
| 26 | 26 | (Germany) Florian Mayer | 1,405 | 10 | 90 | 1,485 | Third round lost to (Spain) David Ferrer [5] |
| 27 | 27 | (Croatia) Marin Čilić | 1,375 | 45 | 90 | 1,420 | Third round lost to (Switzerland) Roger Federer [3] |
| 28 | 28 | (United States) John Isner | 1,545 | 90 | 360 | 1,815 | Quarterfinals lost to (United Kingdom) Andy Murray [4] |
| 29 | 30 | (France) Michaël Llodra | 1,280 | 90 | 45 | 1,235 | Second round lost to (South Africa) Kevin Anderson |
| 30 | 31 | (Croatia) Ivan Ljubičić | 1,280 | 10 | 45 | 1,315 | Second round lost to (Argentina) David Nalbandian |
| 31 | 32 | (Spain) Marcel Granollers | 1,243 | 45 | 90 | 1,288 | Third round lost to (Spain) Juan Carlos Ferrero |
| 32 | 33 | (Croatia) Ivan Dodig | 1,207 | 70 | 10 | 1,147 | First round lost to (Russia) Nikolay Davydenko |

=== Withdrawals ===
| Rank | Player | Points | Points defending | Points won | New points | Withdrew due to |
|---|---|---|---|---|---|---|
| 6 | (Sweden) Robin Söderling | 4,145 | 360 | 0 | 3,785 | illness |
| 29 | (Canada) Milos Raonic | 1,312 | 35 | 0 | 1,277 | hip injury |

=== Women's singles ===
| Seed | Rank | Player | Points | Points defending | Points won | New points | Status |
|---|---|---|---|---|---|---|---|
| 1 | 1 | (Denmark) Caroline Wozniacki | 9,335 | 900 | 900 | 9,335 | Semifinals lost to (United States) Serena Williams [28] |
| 2 | 2 | (Russia) Vera Zvonareva | 6,820 | 1,400 | 500 | 5,920 | Quarterfinals lost to (Australia) Samantha Stosur [9] |
| 3 | 4 | (Russia) Maria Sharapova | 6,346 | 280 | 160 | 6,226 | Third round lost to (Italy) Flavia Pennetta [26] |
| 4 | 5 | (Belarus) Victoria Azarenka | 5,995 | 100 | 160 | 6,055 | Third round lost to (United States) Serena Williams [28] |
| 5 | 6 | (Czech Republic) Petra Kvitová | 5,685 | 160 | 5 | 5,530 | First round lost to (Romania) Alexandra Dulgheru |
| 6 | 7 | (China) Li Na | 5,870 | 5 | 5 | 5,870 | First round lost to (Romania) Simona Halep |
| 7 | 8 | (Italy) Francesca Schiavone | 4,995 | 500 | 280 | 4,775 | Fourth round lost to (Russia) Anastasia Pavlyuchenkova [17] |
| 8 | 9 | (France) Marion Bartoli | 4,225 | 100 | 100 | 4,225 | Second round lost to (United States) Christina McHale |
| 9 | 10 | (Australia) Samantha Stosur | 3,880 | 500 | 2000 | 5,380 | Champion, defeated (United States) Serena Williams [28] |
| 10 | 11 | (Germany) Andrea Petkovic | 3,805 | 280 | 500 | 4,025 | Quarterfinals lost to (Denmark) Caroline Wozniacki [1] |
| 11 | 12 | (Serbia) Jelena Janković | 3,270 | 160 | 160 | 3,270 | Third round lost to (Russia) Anastasia Pavlyuchenkova [17] |
| 12 | 13 | (Poland) Agnieszka Radwańska | 3,270 | 100 | 100 | 3,270 | Second round lost to (Germany) Angelique Kerber |
| 13 | 14 | (China) Peng Shuai | 2,705 | 160 | 280 | 2,825 | Fourth round lost to (Italy) Flavia Pennetta [26] |
| 14 | 15 | (Slovakia) Dominika Cibulková | 2,565 | 500 | 100 | 2,165 | Second round lost to (United States) Irina Falconi |
| 15 | 16 | (Russia) Svetlana Kuznetsova | 2,481 | 280 | 280 | 2,481 | Fourth round lost to (Denmark) Caroline Wozniacki [1] |
| 16 | 17 | (Serbia) Ana Ivanovic | 2,415 | 280 | 280 | 2,415 | Fourth round lost to (United States) Serena Williams [28] |
| 17 | 18 | (Russia) Anastasia Pavlyuchenkova | 2,500 | 280 | 500 | 2,720 | Quarterfinals lost to (United States) Serena Williams [28] |
| 18 | 19 | (Italy) Roberta Vinci | 2,350 | 5 | 160 | 2,505 | Third round lost to (Germany) Andrea Petkovic [10] |
| 19 | 20 | (Germany) Julia Görges | 2,335 | 100 | 160 | 2,395 | Third round lost to (China) Peng Shuai [13] |
| 20 | 21 | (Belgium) Yanina Wickmayer | 2,320 | 280 | 100 | 2,140 | Second round lost to (Russia) Alla Kudryavtseva |
| 21 | 22 | (Slovakia) Daniela Hantuchová | 2,220 | 160 | 5 | 2,065 | First round lost to (France) Pauline Parmentier |
| 22 | 23 | (Germany) Sabine Lisicki | 2,478 | 100 | 280 | 2,658 | Fourth round lost to (Russia) Vera Zvonareva [2] |
| 23 | 24 | (Israel) Shahar Pe'er | 2,115 | 280 | 100 | 1,935 | Second round lost to (United States) Sloane Stephens [WC] |
| 24 | 25 | (Russia) Nadia Petrova | 1,695 | 5 | 160 | 1,850 | Third round lost to (Australia) Samantha Stosur [9] |
| 25 | 26 | (Russia) Maria Kirilenko | 1,735 | 160 | 280 | 1,855 | Fourth round lost to (Australia) Samantha Stosur [9] |
| 26 | 27 | (Italy) Flavia Pennetta | 1,800 | 160 | 500 | 2,140 | Quarterfinals lost to (Germany) Angelique Kerber |
| 27 | 28 | (Czech Republic) Lucie Šafářová | 1,785 | 5 | 160 | 1,940 | Third round lost to (Romania) Monica Niculescu |
| 28 | 29 | (United States) Serena Williams | 1,780 | 0 | 1400 | 3,180 | Runner-up; final lost to (Australia) Samantha Stosur [9] |
| 29 | 31 | (Australia) Jarmila Gajdošová | 1,690 | 5 | 100 | 1,785 | Second round lost to (United States) Vania King |
| 30 | 32 | (Spain) Anabel Medina Garrigues | 1,610 | 5 | 160 | 1,765 | Third round lost to (Russia) Vera Zvonareva [2] |
| 31 | 33 | (Estonia) Kaia Kanepi | 1,508 | 500 | 100 | 1,108 | Second round lost to (Spain) Sílvia Soler Espinosa [Q] |
| 32 | 34 | (Spain) María José Martínez Sánchez | 1,505 | 100 | 5 | 1,410 | First round lost to (Germany) Mona Barthel |

=== Withdrawals ===
| Rank | Player | Points | Points defending | Points won | New points | Withdrew due to |
|---|---|---|---|---|---|---|
| 3 | (Belgium) Kim Clijsters | 6,501 | 2,000 | 0 | 4,501 | stomach muscle injury |
| 30 | (Russia) Alisa Kleybanova | 1,755 | 100 | 0 | 1,655 | Hodgkins Lymphoma |

== Wild card entries ==
Below are the lists of the wild card awardees entering in the main draws.

=== Men's singles wild card entries ===
1. (France) Julien Benneteau
2. (United States) Robby Ginepri
3. (United States) Ryan Harrison
4. (United States) Steve Johnson
5. (Australia) Marinko Matosevic
6. (United States) Bobby Reynolds
7. (United States) Jack Sock
8. (United States) Donald Young

=== Women's singles wild card entries ===
1. (United States) Jill Craybas
2. (United States) Lauren Davis
3. (Australia) Casey Dellacqua
4. (United States) Jamie Hampton
5. (United States) Madison Keys
6. (France) Aravane Rezaï
7. (United States) Alison Riske
8. (United States) Sloane Stephens

=== Men's doubles wild card entries ===
1. (United States) Jeff Dadamo / (United States) Austin Krajicek
2. (United States) Robby Ginepri / (United States) Rhyne Williams
3. (United States) Steve Johnson / (United States) Denis Kudla
4. (United States) Bradley Klahn / (United States) David Martin
5. (United States) Travis Parrott / (United States) Bobby Reynolds
6. (United States) Jack Sock / (United States) Jackson Withrow

=== Women's doubles wild card entries ===
1. (United States) Hilary Barte / (United States) Mallory Burdette
2. (United States) Samantha Crawford / (United States) Madison Keys
3. (United States) Lauren Davis / (United States) Nicole Gibbs
4. (United States) Alexa Glatch / (United States) Jamie Hampton
5. (United States) Melanie Oudin / (United States) Ahsha Rolle
6. (United States) Jessica Pegula / (United States) Taylor Townsend
7. (United States) Alison Riske / (United States) Sloane Stephens

=== Mixed doubles wild card entries ===
1. (United States) Irina Falconi / (United States) Steve Johnson
2. (United States) Christina Fusano / (United States) David Martin
3. (United States) Raquel Kops-Jones / (United States) Rajeev Ram
4. (United States) Melanie Oudin / (United States) Jack Sock (champions)
5. (United States) Abigail Spears / (United States) Travis Parrott
6. (United States) Taylor Townsend / (United States) Donald Young
7. (United States) CoCo Vandeweghe / (United States) Eric Butorac
8. (United States) Mashona Washington / (United States) Michael Russell

== Protected ranking ==
The following players were accepted directly into the main draw using a protected ranking:

Men's Singles

- (Chile) Fernando González
- (Germany) Tommy Haas
- (Croatia) Ivo Karlović

Women's Singles

- (Ukraine) Alona Bondarenko
- (United States) Serena Williams

== Qualifiers entries ==
=== Men's singles qualifiers entries ===
1. (Brazil) João Souza
2. (Monaco) Jean-René Lisnard
3. (Turkey) Marsel İlhan
4. (Netherlands) Jesse Huta Galung
5. (Ukraine) Sergei Bubka
6. (France) Augustin Gensse
7. (Republic of Ireland) Louk Sorensen
8. (Canada) Vasek Pospisil
9. (Japan) Go Soeda
10. (Tunisia) Malek Jaziri
11. (Republic of Ireland) Conor Niland
12. (Colombia) Robert Farah
13. (France) Romain Jouan
14. (Canada) Frank Dancevic
15. (France) Jonathan Dasnières de Veigy
16. (United States) Michael Yani

The following players received entry from a lucky loser spot:

1. (Slovakia) Lukáš Lacko
2. (Brazil) Rogério Dutra da Silva

=== Women's singles qualifiers entries ===
1. (Kazakhstan) Galina Voskoboeva
2. (New Zealand) Marina Erakovic
3. (Spain) Sílvia Soler Espinosa
4. (Italy) Romina Oprandi
5. (Hungary) Réka Luca Jani
6. (Russia) Alexandra Panova
7. (France) Stéphanie Foretz Gacon
8. (Poland) Urszula Radwańska
9. (Netherlands) Michaëlla Krajicek
10. (Thailand) Noppawan Lertcheewakarn
11. (United Kingdom) Laura Robson
12. (Russia) Vitalia Diatchenko
13. (Chinese Taipei) Chan Yung-jan
14. (Russia) Ekaterina Bychkova
15. (Italy) Karin Knapp
16. (Canada) Aleksandra Wozniak

== Withdrawn players ==
The following players were accepted directly into the main tournament, but withdrew with injuries.

Men's Singles

- (France) Jérémy Chardy → replaced by (Argentina) Horacio Zeballos
- (Uruguay) Pablo Cuevas → replaced by (Italy) Flavio Cipolla
- (Poland) Łukasz Kubot → replaced by (Slovakia) Lukáš Lacko
- (United States) Sam Querrey → replaced by (United States) Michael Russell
- (Canada) Milos Raonic → replaced by (Japan) Tatsuma Ito
- (Spain) Tommy Robredo → replaced by (Netherlands) Thiemo de Bakker
- (Sweden) Robin Söderling → replaced by (Brazil) Rogério Dutra da Silva

Women's Singles

- (Switzerland) Timea Bacsinszky → replaced by (Japan) Misaki Doi
- (Russia) Anna Chakvetadze → replaced by (Australia) Anastasia Rodionova
- (Belgium) Kim Clijsters → replaced by (Spain) Nuria Llagostera Vives
- (Spain) Lourdes Domínguez Lino → replaced by (Germany) Mona Barthel
- (Russia) Alisa Kleybanova → replaced by (United Kingdom) Heather Watson
- (Russia) Dinara Safina → replaced by (Greece) Eleni Daniilidou

| Preceded by 2011 Wimbledon Championships | Grand Slams | Succeeded by 2012 Australian Open |
