= 2011 US Open – Men's doubles =

Men's doubles
- 2011 US Open

Final
- Champion: (Austria) Jürgen Melzer (Germany) Philipp Petzschner
- Runner-up: (Poland) Mariusz Fyrstenberg (Poland) Marcin Matkowski
- Score: 6–2, 6–2

Details
- Draw: 64
- Seeds: 16

Events
Singles	men	women		boys	girls
Doubles	men	women	mixed	boys	girls
WC Singles	men	women	quad
WC Doubles	men	women	quad
Legends	men	women	mixed
← 2010 ·	US Open	· 2012 →

Bob and Mike Bryan were the defending champions, but lost in the first round to Ivo Karlović and Frank Moser. It marked the first time the Bryan brothers lost in the first round of a Grand Slam tournament since the 2001 Australian Open, a span of 42 Grand Slam tournaments, and their first opening round loss at the US Open since 1999.

Jürgen Melzer and Philipp Petzschner won the title, defeating the Polish team of Mariusz Fyrstenberg and Marcin Matkowski in the final, 6–2, 6–2.

== Seeds ==
1. (United States) Bob Bryan / (United States) Mike Bryan (first round)
2. (Belarus) Max Mirnyi / (Canada) Daniel Nestor (second round)
3. (France) Michaël Llodra / (Serbia) Nenad Zimonjić (third round)
4. (India) Mahesh Bhupathi / (India) Leander Paes (quarterfinals)
5. (India) Rohan Bopanna / (Pakistan) Aisam-ul-Haq Qureshi (semifinals)
6. (Poland) Mariusz Fyrstenberg / (Poland) Marcin Matkowski (final)
7. (Sweden) Robert Lindstedt / (Romania) Horia Tecău (quarterfinals)
8. (United States) Eric Butorac / (Curaçao) Jean-Julien Rojer (second round)
9. (Austria) Jürgen Melzer / (Germany) Philipp Petzschner (champions)
10. (Germany) Christopher Kas / (Austria) Alexander Peya (first round)
11. (Czech Republic) František Čermák / (Slovakia) Filip Polášek (first round)
12. (Brazil) Marcelo Melo / (Brazil) Bruno Soares (second round)
13. (Spain) Marcel Granollers / (Spain) Marc López (third round, withdrew)
14. (Argentina) Eduardo Schwank / (Argentina) Juan Ignacio Chela (second round)
15. (The Bahamas) Mark Knowles / (Belgium) Xavier Malisse (third round)
16. (United States) Scott Lipsky / (United States) Rajeev Ram (first round)

== Draw ==
=== Key ===
- Q = Qualifier
- WC = Wild card
- LL = Lucky loser
- Alt = Alternate
- ITF = ITF entry
- PR = Protected ranking
- SR = Special ranking
- SE = Special exempt
- JE = Junior exempt
- JR = Junior Accelerator Programme entrant
- CO = College Accelerator Programme entrant
- NG = Next Gen Accelerator Program entrant
- w/o = Walkover
- r = Retired
- d = Defaulted

=== Finals ===
Quarterfinals
(Italy) Simone Bolelli (Italy) Fabio Fognini	1	7^{9}	6
7	(Sweden) Robert Lindstedt (Romania) Horia Tecău	6	6^{7}	4
(Spain) David Marrero (Italy) Andreas Seppi	1	2
9	(Austria) Jürgen Melzer (Germany) Philipp Petzschner	6	6
6	(Poland) Mariusz Fyrstenberg (Poland) Marcin Matkowski	6	7^{7}
4	(India) Mahesh Bhupathi (India) Leander Paes	4	6^{4}
5	(India) Rohan Bopanna (Pakistan) Aisam-ul-Haq Qureshi	7	2	7
(United Kingdom) Colin Fleming (United Kingdom) Ross Hutchins	5	6	5

Semifinals
(Italy) Simone Bolelli (Italy) Fabio Fognini	4	7^{7}	1
9	(Austria) Jürgen Melzer (Germany) Philipp Petzschner	6	6^{3}	6
6	(Poland) Mariusz Fyrstenberg (Poland) Marcin Matkowski	6	7^{7}
5	(India) Rohan Bopanna (Pakistan) Aisam-ul-Haq Qureshi	2	6^{4}

Final
9	(Austria) Jürgen Melzer (Germany) Philipp Petzschner	6	6
6	(Poland) Mariusz Fyrstenberg (Poland) Marcin Matkowski	2	2

=== Top half ===
==== Section 1 ====
First round
1	(United States) B Bryan (United States) M Bryan	4	6	2
(Croatia) I Karlović (Germany) F Moser	6	2	6
(Argentina) C Berlocq (Czech Republic) L Rosol	6^{3}	6	4
(Italy) S Bolelli (Italy) F Fognini	7^{7}	4	6
(Australia) A Fisher (Australia) S Huss	6	3	5
Alt	(Germany) M Emmrich (Sweden) A Siljeström	3	6	7
WC	(United States) J Sock (United States) J Withrow	3	7^{7}	1
15	(The Bahamas) M Knowles (Belgium) X Malisse	6	6^{5}	6
11	(Czech Republic) F Čermák (Slovakia) F Polášek	4	4
(Italy) D Bracciali (Italy) P Starace	6	6
(Uzbekistan) D Istomin (Kazakhstan) M Kukushkin	3	6	7^{8}
(Sweden) J Brunström (Finland) J Nieminen	6	2	6^{6}
(Croatia) I Dodig (Australia) B Tomic	2	5
(Spain) P Andújar (Spain) D Gimeno-Traver	6	7
WC	(United States) B Klahn (United States) D Martin	4	4
7	(Sweden) R Lindstedt (Romania) H Tecău	6	6

Second round
(Croatia) I Karlović (Germany) F Moser	6^{3}	3
(Italy) S Bolelli (Italy) F Fognini	7^{7}	6
Alt	(Germany) M Emmrich (Sweden) A Siljeström	3	3
15	(The Bahamas) M Knowles (Belgium) X Malisse	6	6
(Italy) D Bracciali (Italy) P Starace	6	6
(Uzbekistan) D Istomin (Kazakhstan) M Kukushkin	3	4
(Spain) P Andújar (Spain) D Gimeno-Traver	5	6	2
7	(Sweden) R Lindstedt (Romania) H Tecău	7	3	6

Third round
(Italy) S Bolelli (Italy) F Fognini	7	6
15	(The Bahamas) M Knowles (Belgium) X Malisse	5	4
(Italy) D Bracciali (Italy) P Starace	6^{4}	6^{3}
7	(Sweden) R Lindstedt (Romania) H Tecău	7^{7}	7^{7}

Quarterfinals
(Italy) S Bolelli (Italy) F Fognini	1	7^{9}	6
7	(Sweden) R Lindstedt (Romania) H Tecău	6	6^{7}	4

==== Section 2 ====
First round
3	(France) M Llodra (Serbia) N Zimonjić	7^{7}	7^{11}
(United States) M Russell (United States) D Young	6^{5}	6^{9}
(Austria) A Haider-Maurer (Slovenia) B Kavčič	2	5
(Spain) N Almagro (Argentina) M González	6	7
(France) A Clément (Czech Republic) L Dlouhý	4	6^{7}
(Spain) D Marrero (Italy) A Seppi	6	7^{9}
(Germany) M Kohlmann (Germany) A Waske	5	7^{8}	7^{7}
16	(United States) S Lipsky (United States) R Ram	7	6^{6}	6^{5}
9	(Austria) J Melzer (Germany) P Petzschner	6	6
(Mexico) S González (United Kingdom) J Murray	3	0
(Israel) J Erlich (Israel) A Ram	4	7^{7}	6
(Argentina) L Arnold Ker (Argentina) J Mónaco	6	6^{5}	3
(Ukraine) S Stakhovsky (Russia) M Youzhny	6	6
(Netherlands) R Haase (Romania) V Hănescu	1	2
(Bulgaria) G Dimitrov (Russia) D Tursunov	7^{7}	2	0
8	(United States) E Butorac (Curaçao) J-J Rojer	6^{3}	6	6

Second round
3	(France) M Llodra (Serbia) N Zimonjić	6	6
(Spain) N Almagro (Argentina) M González	3	4
(Spain) D Marrero (Italy) A Seppi	6	7
(Germany) M Kohlmann (Germany) A Waske	4	5
9	(Austria) J Melzer (Germany) P Petzschner	7^{7}	6
(Israel) J Erlich (Israel) A Ram	6^{2}	2
(Ukraine) S Stakhovsky (Russia) M Youzhny	6	1	7
8	(United States) E Butorac (Curaçao) J-J Rojer	3	6	5

Third round
3	(France) M Llodra (Serbia) N Zimonjić	6^{4}	4
(Spain) D Marrero (Italy) A Seppi	7^{7}	6
9	(Austria) J Melzer (Germany) P Petzschner	7^{7}	6
(Ukraine) S Stakhovsky (Russia) M Youzhny	6^{3}	3

Quarterfinals
(Spain) D Marrero (Italy) A Seppi	1	2
9	(Austria) J Melzer (Germany) P Petzschner	6	6

=== Bottom half ===
==== Section 3 ====
First round
6	(Poland) M Fyrstenberg (Poland) M Matkowski	4	6	6
WC	(United States) M Shabaz (United States) R Sweeting	6	2	1
(Belgium) O Rochus (Brazil) A Sá	4	6	5
(Argentina) H Zeballos (Austria) J Knowle	6	3	7
(Germany) M Bachinger (Germany) P Kohlschreiber	3	7^{7}	4
(United Kingdom) J Delgado (United Kingdom) J Marray	6	6^{5}	6
WC	(United States) S Johnson (United States) D Kudla	2	1
12	(Brazil) M Melo (Brazil) B Soares	6	6
14	(Argentina) E Schwank (Argentina) JI Chela	6	4	6
(Canada) A Shamasdin (Slovakia) I Zelenay	3	6	1
(Russia) I Andreev (Russia) I Kunitsyn	3	4
(India) S Devvarman (Philippines) TC Huey	6	6
(Germany) F Mayer (Netherlands) R Wassen	7	6
(France) M Gicquel (France) G Monfils	5	2
(Ukraine) A Dolgopolov (Spain) A Ramos	6^{8}	4
4	(India) M Bhupathi (India) L Paes	7^{10}	6

Second round
6	(Poland) M Fyrstenberg (Poland) M Matkowski	6	6
(Argentina) H Zeballos (Austria) J Knowle	4	1
(United Kingdom) J Delgado (United Kingdom) J Marray	6	6^{8}	7^{7}
12	(Brazil) M Melo (Brazil) B Soares	3	7^{10}	6^{2}
14	(Argentina) E Schwank (Argentina) JI Chela	3	4
(India) S Devvarman (Philippines) TC Huey	6	6
(Germany) F Mayer (Netherlands) R Wassen	6^{5}	2
4	(India) M Bhupathi (India) L Paes	7^{7}	6

Third round
6	(Poland) M Fyrstenberg (Poland) M Matkowski	6^{5}	6	6
(United Kingdom) J Delgado (United Kingdom) J Marray	7^{7}	2	3
(India) S Devvarman (Philippines) TC Huey	4	5
4	(India) M Bhupathi (India) L Paes	6	7

Quarterfinals
6	(Poland) M Fyrstenberg (Poland) M Matkowski	6	7^{7}
4	(India) M Bhupathi (India) L Paes	4	6^{4}

==== Section 4 ====
First round
5	(India) R Bopanna (Pakistan) A-u-H Qureshi	6	2	6
WC	(United States) R Ginepri (United States) R Williams	1	6	2
WC	(United States) T Parrott (United States) B Reynolds	3	6^{6}
(United States) J Cerretani (Germany) P Marx	6	7^{8}
WC	(United States) J Dadamo (United States) A Krajicek	6^{2}	4
(Colombia) JS Cabal (Colombia) R Farah	7^{7}	6
(Australia) P Hanley (Belgium) D Norman	7^{7}	7
10	(Germany) C Kas (Austria) A Peya	6^{5}	5
13	(Spain) M Granollers (Spain) M López	3
(Spain) G García-López (Spain) A Montañés	0	r
(United States) A Bogomolov Jr. (Australia) M Ebden	6	4	4
(Brazil) F Ferreiro (Portugal) R Machado	2	6	6
(Czech Republic) M Damm (Czech Republic) R Štěpánek	3	3
(United Kingdom) C Fleming (United Kingdom) R Hutchins	6	6
(Colombia) S Giraldo (Spain) P Riba	3	2
2	(Belarus) M Mirnyi (Canada) D Nestor	6	6

Second round
5	(India) R Bopanna (Pakistan) A-u-H Qureshi	7^{7}	7^{7}
(United States) J Cerretani (Germany) P Marx	6^{3}	6^{4}
(Colombia) JS Cabal (Colombia) R Farah	2	3
(Australia) P Hanley (Belgium) D Norman	6	6
13	(Spain) M Granollers (Spain) M López	6	3	6
(Brazil) F Ferreiro (Portugal) R Machado	3	6	4
(United Kingdom) C Fleming (United Kingdom) R Hutchins	6	7
2	(Belarus) M Mirnyi (Canada) D Nestor	3	5

Third round
5	(India) R Bopanna (Pakistan) A-u-H Qureshi	6	6
(Australia) P Hanley (Belgium) D Norman	2	3
13	(Spain) M Granollers (Spain) M López
(United Kingdom) C Fleming (United Kingdom) R Hutchins	w/o

Quarterfinals
5	(India) R Bopanna (Pakistan) A-u-H Qureshi	7	2	7
(United Kingdom) C Fleming (United Kingdom) R Hutchins	5	6	5
