= 2011 US Open – Men's singles =

Tennis tournament

Men's singles
- 2011 US Open

Final
- Champion: (Serbia) Novak Djokovic
- Runner-up: (Spain) Rafael Nadal
- Score: 6–2, 6–4, 6–7^{(3–7)}, 6–1

Details
- Draw: 128
- Seeds: 32

Events
Singles	men	women		boys	girls
Doubles	men	women	mixed	boys	girls
WC Singles	men	women	quad
WC Doubles	men	women	quad
Legends	men	women	mixed
← 2010 ·	US Open	· 2012 →

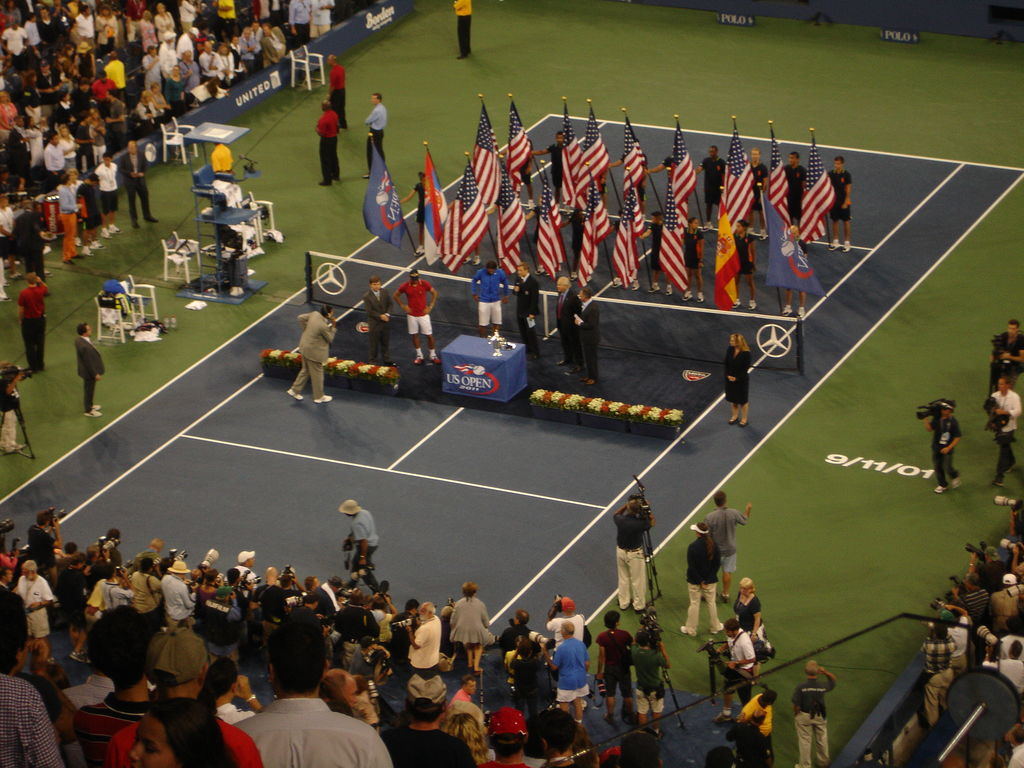
The trophy presentation

Novak Djokovic defeated defending champion Rafael Nadal in a rematch of the previous year's final, 6–2, 6–4, 6–7^{(3–7)}, 6–1 to win the men's singles tennis title at the 2011 US Open. It was his first US Open title and fourth major title overall. Djokovic saved two match points en route to the title, against Roger Federer in the semifinals. This was the second consecutive US Open where Djokovic saved two match points against Federer to reach the final, and the fifth consecutive US Open where the pair played each other. Federer's defeat meant that he did not win a major in a calendar year for the first time since 2002.

Andy Roddick and John Isner, who both lost in the quarterfinals, remained the last American men to reach a major quarterfinal until Sam Querrey at the 2016 Wimbledon Championships, a span of 22 events.

This marked the last US Open appearance of 2003 finalist and former world No. 1 Juan Carlos Ferrero.

== Seeds ==
1. (Serbia) Novak Djokovic (champion)
2. (Spain) Rafael Nadal (final)
3. (Switzerland) Roger Federer (semifinals)
4. (United Kingdom) Andy Murray (semifinals)
5. (Spain) David Ferrer (fourth round)
6. (Sweden) Robin Söderling (withdrew)
7. (France) Gaël Monfils (second round)
8. (United States) Mardy Fish (fourth round)
9. (Czech Republic) Tomáš Berdych (third round, retired)
10. (Spain) Nicolás Almagro (first round)
11. (France) Jo-Wilfried Tsonga (quarterfinals)
12. (France) Gilles Simon (fourth round)
13. (France) Richard Gasquet (second round)
14. (Switzerland) Stanislas Wawrinka (second round)
15. (Serbia) Viktor Troicki (first round)
16. (Russia) Mikhail Youzhny (first round)

17. (Austria) Jürgen Melzer (second round)
18. (Argentina) Juan Martín del Potro (third round)
19. (Spain) Fernando Verdasco (third round)
20. (Serbia) Janko Tipsarević (quarterfinals, retired)
21. (United States) Andy Roddick (quarterfinals)
22. (Ukraine) Alexandr Dolgopolov (fourth round)
23. (Czech Republic) Radek Štěpánek (second round, retired)
24. (Argentina) Juan Ignacio Chela (third round)
25. (Spain) Feliciano López (third round)
26. (Germany) Florian Mayer (third round)
27. (Croatia) Marin Čilić (third round)
28. (United States) John Isner (quarterfinals)
29. (France) Michaël Llodra (second round)
30. (Croatia) Ivan Ljubičić (second round)
31. (Spain) Marcel Granollers (third round, retired)
32. (Croatia) Ivan Dodig (first round)

Click on the seed number of a player to go to their draw section.

== Main draw ==
=== Key ===
- Q = Qualifier
- WC = Wild card
- LL = Lucky loser
- Alt = Alternate
- ITF = ITF entry
- PR = Protected ranking
- SR = Special ranking
- SE = Special exempt
- JE = Junior exempt
- JR = Junior Accelerator Programme entrant
- CO = College Accelerator Programme entrant
- NG = Next Gen Accelerator Program entrant
- w/o = Walkover
- r = Retired
- d = Defaulted

=== Finals ===
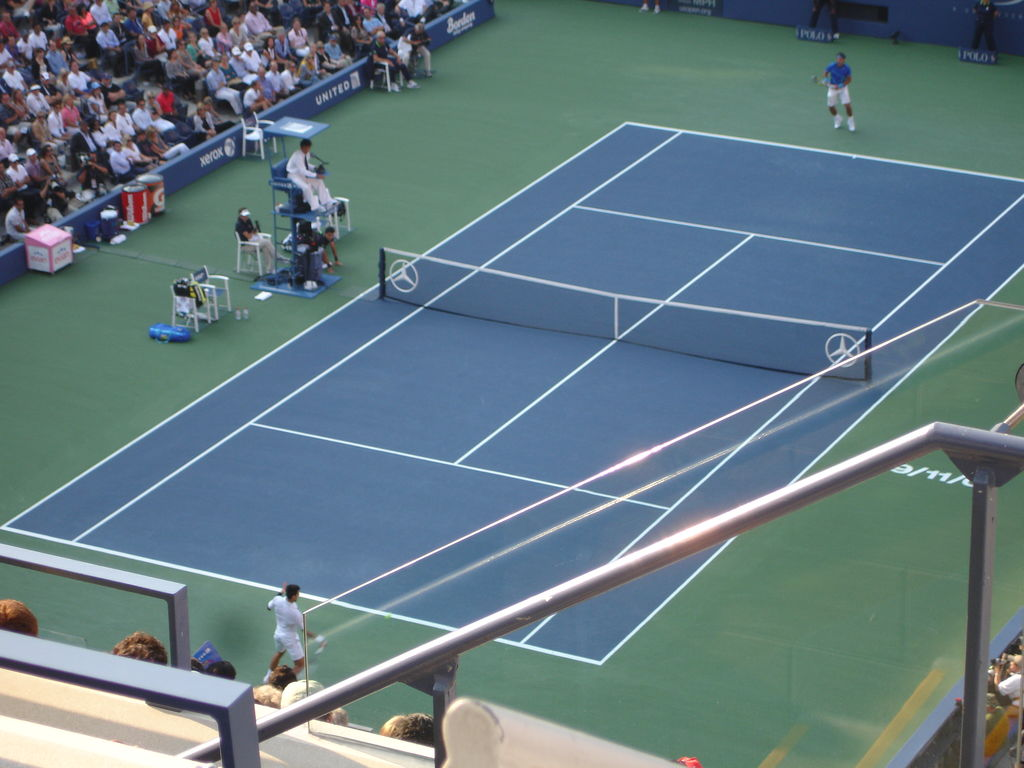
Detail from final (Novak Djokovic vs. Rafael Nadal)

Quarterfinals
1	(Serbia) Novak Djokovic	7^{7}	6^{3}	6	3
20	(Serbia) Janko Tipsarević	6^{2}	7^{7}	0	0^{r}
3	(Switzerland) Roger Federer	6	6	6
11	(France) Jo-Wilfried Tsonga	4	3	3
28	(United States) John Isner	5	4	6	6^{2}
4	(United Kingdom) Andy Murray	7	6	3	7^{7}
21	(United States) Andy Roddick	2	1	3
2	(Spain) Rafael Nadal	6	6	6

Semifinals
1	(Serbia) Novak Djokovic	6^{7}	4	6	6	7
3	(Switzerland) Roger Federer	7^{9}	6	3	2	5
4	(United Kingdom) Andy Murray	4	2	6	2
2	(Spain) Rafael Nadal	6	6	3	6

Final
1	(Serbia) Novak Djokovic	6	6	6^{3}	6
2	(Spain) Rafael Nadal	2	4	7^{7}	1

=== Top half ===
==== Section 1 ====
First round
1	(Serbia) N Djokovic	6	5
Q	(Republic of Ireland) C Niland	0	1^{r}
(Spain) P Riba	5	0	1
(Argentina) C Berlocq	7	6	6
(Italy) P Starace	6	4	6	6
(Germany) M Berrer	4	6	3	2
(Russia) N Davydenko	6^{6}	6	6	2	6
32	(Croatia) I Dodig	7^{8}	3	0	6	2
22	(Ukraine) A Dolgopolov	6	6	7
(Portugal) F Gil	4	2	5
(Japan) K Nishikori	4	2	0^{r}
(Italy) F Cipolla	6	6	0
PR	(Croatia) I Karlović	6	6	7^{7}
PR	(Chile) F González	4	4	6^{3}
(Ukraine) S Stakhovsky	4	4	0
13	(France) R Gasquet	6	6	6

Second round
1	(Serbia) N Djokovic	6	6	6
(Argentina) C Berlocq	0	0	2
(Italy) P Starace	2	4	5
(Russia) N Davydenko	6	6	7
22	(Ukraine) A Dolgopolov	6	7	2	5	6
(Italy) F Cipolla	0	5	6	7	4
PR	(Croatia) I Karlović	6	6	2	7^{7}
13	(France) R Gasquet	4	2	6	6^{4}

Third round
1	(Serbia) N Djokovic	6	6	6
(Russia) N Davydenko	3	4	2
22	(Ukraine) A Dolgopolov	6^{4}	6	6	6
PR	(Croatia) I Karlović	7^{7}	2	4	4

Fourth round
1	(Serbia) N Djokovic	7^{16}	6	6
22	(Ukraine) A Dolgopolov	6^{14}	4	2

==== Section 2 ====
First round
9	(Czech Republic) T Berdych	6	7^{7}	6
Q	(France) R Jouan	2	6^{4}	1
(Italy) F Fognini	5	6	7^{7}	6
(Argentina) H Zeballos	7	4	6^{5}	4
(Germany) P Petzschner	7	6^{2}	6	6^{5}	6
(Spain) A Ramos	5	7^{7}	3	7^{7}	3
Q	(France) A Gensse	2	5	0
20	(Serbia) J Tipsarević	6	7	6
31	(Spain) M Granollers	6	6	6
(Belgium) X Malisse	4	4	4
(Kazakhstan) M Kukushkin	7	6	3	7^{7}
(Spain) A Montañés	5	2	6	6^{5}
(Spain) P Andújar	6	5	7	1	3
(Spain) JC Ferrero	1	7	5	6	6
(Bulgaria) G Dimitrov	6^{4}	3	4
7	(France) G Monfils	7^{7}	6	6

Second round
9	(Czech Republic) T Berdych	7	6	6
(Italy) F Fognini	5	0	0
(Germany) P Petzschner	0	3	6	3
20	(Serbia) J Tipsarević	6	6	3	6
31	(Spain) M Granollers	7	6	6
(Kazakhstan) M Kukushkin	5	3	4
(Spain) JC Ferrero	7^{7}	5	6^{5}	6	6
7	(France) G Monfils	6^{5}	7	7^{7}	4	4

Third round
9	(Czech Republic) T Berdych	4	0^{r}
20	(Serbia) J Tipsarević	6	5
31	(Spain) M Granollers	1	3^{r}
(Spain) JC Ferrero	6	4

Fourth round
20	(Serbia) J Tipsarević	7	6^{3}	7	6
(Spain) JC Ferrero	5	7^{7}	5	2

==== Section 3 ====
First round
3	(Switzerland) R Federer	6	6	6
(Colombia) S Giraldo	4	3	2
(Israel) D Sela	4	2	6	6	6
(Brazil) T Bellucci	6	6	4	3	0
Q	(United States) M Yani	3	4	4
(Australia) B Tomic	6	6	6
WC	(United States) R Harrison	2	5	6^{6}
27	(Croatia) M Čilić	6	7	7^{8}
23	(Czech Republic) R Štěpánek	6	6	6
(Germany) P Kohlschreiber	4	1	3
(Argentina) J Mónaco	7^{7}	6	6
(Italy) A Seppi	6^{1}	2	2
PR	(Germany) T Haas	6	6	6^{5}	6
Q	(France) J Dasnières de Veigy	3	4	7^{7}	1
(Colombia) A Falla	3	6	4	7	7
15	(Serbia) V Troicki	6	3	6	5	5

Second round
3	(Switzerland) R Federer	6	6	6
(Israel) D Sela	3	2	2
(Australia) B Tomic	1	0	2
27	(Croatia) M Čilić	6	6	6
23	(Czech Republic) R Štěpánek	4	1	0^{r}
(Argentina) J Mónaco	6	6	2
PR	(Germany) T Haas	7^{7}	6	7
(Colombia) A Falla	6^{5}	1	5

Third round
3	(Switzerland) R Federer	6	4	6	6
27	(Croatia) M Čilić	3	6	4	2
(Argentina) J Mónaco	6^{3}	6	6	6
PR	(Germany) T Haas	7^{7}	3	2	3

Fourth round
3	(Switzerland) R Federer	6	6	6
(Argentina) J Mónaco	1	2	0

==== Section 4 ====
First round
11	(France) J-W Tsonga	6	6	6
(Chinese Taipei) Y-h Lu	4	4	4
(Austria) A Haider-Maurer	3	2	6	4
Q	(Ukraine) S Bubka	6	6	3	6
Q	(Turkey) M İlhan	6	6	1
Q	(Canada) F Dancevic	3	2	0^{r}
(Finland) J Nieminen	6	4	1	4
19	(Spain) F Verdasco	3	6	6	6
29	(France) M Llodra	6	4	4	6	6
(Romania) V Hănescu	2	6	6	3	2
(South Africa) K Anderson	6	6	6
Q	(Japan) G Soeda	1	3	0
Q	(Tunisia) M Jaziri	4	6	6	6
(Netherlands) T de Bakker	6	1	4	2
(Germany) T Kamke	2	2	1
8	(United States) M Fish	6	6	6

Second round
11	(France) J-W Tsonga	6	7	6
Q	(Ukraine) S Bubka	3	5	2
Q	(Turkey) M İlhan	4	3	1
19	(Spain) F Verdasco	6	6	6
29	(France) M Llodra	1	2	2
(South Africa) K Anderson	6	6	6
Q	(Tunisia) M Jaziri	2	2	4
8	(United States) M Fish	6	6	6

Third round
11	(France) J-W Tsonga	6	7	6
19	(Spain) F Verdasco	3	5	4
(South Africa) K Anderson	4	6^{4}	6^{3}
8	(United States) M Fish	6	7^{7}	7^{7}

Fourth round
11	(France) J-W Tsonga	6	6^{5}	3	6	6
8	(United States) M Fish	4	7^{7}	6	4	2

=== Bottom half ===
==== Section 5 ====
First round
LL	(Brazil) R Dutra da Silva	6	3	6	1
Q	(Republic of Ireland) L Sorensen	0	6	4	0^{r}
(United States) A Bogomolov Jr.	4	4	6	7^{7}	6
WC	(United States) S Johnson	6	6	3	6^{3}	3
WC	(United States) R Ginepri	6	6	6^{5}	6
Q	(Brazil) J Souza	3	4	7^{7}	1
(Cyprus) M Baghdatis	6^{2}	6^{11}	6	4
28	(United States) J Isner	7^{7}	7^{13}	2	6
18	(Argentina) JM del Potro	6	6	6
(Italy) F Volandri	3	1	1
(Argentina) D Junqueira	6	0
(Slovakia) K Beck	2	0^{r}
(Spain) G García-López	6	1	7^{7}	4	7^{7}
(Spain) D Gimeno-Traver	3	6	6^{1}	6	6^{4}
(Brazil) R Mello	6	3	4	6	4
12	(France) G Simon	3	6	6	3	6

Second round
LL	(Brazil) R Dutra da Silva	4	3	5
(United States) A Bogomolov Jr.	6	6	7
WC	(United States) R Ginepri	4	3	4
28	(United States) J Isner	6	6	6
18	(Argentina) JM del Potro	6	6	7
(Argentina) D Junqueira	2	1	5
(Spain) G García-López	4	7^{7}	5	3
12	(France) G Simon	6	6^{4}	7	6

Third round
(United States) A Bogomolov Jr.	6^{9}	4	4
28	(United States) J Isner	7^{11}	6	6
18	(Argentina) JM del Potro	6	6^{5}	2	6^{3}
12	(France) G Simon	4	7^{7}	6	7^{7}

Fourth round
28	(United States) J Isner	7^{7}	3	7^{7}	7^{7}
12	(France) G Simon	6^{2}	6	6^{2}	6^{4}

==== Section 6 ====
First round
14	(Switzerland) S Wawrinka	3	6	6	6
(Argentina) M González	6	4	1	3
WC	(United States) D Young	6	6	6
LL	(Slovakia) L Lacko	4	2	4
(Russia) D Tursunov	7^{7}	6	5	1	6^{0}
(Belgium) S Darcis	6^{4}	4	7	6	7^{7}
WC	(Australia) M Matosevic	1^{r}
24	(Argentina) JI Chela	3
25	(Spain) F López	6	6	6
(Japan) T Ito	2	4	4
Q	(Canada) V Pospisil	6	6	6
(Czech Republic) L Rosol	1	2	1
(Portugal) R Machado	0	4	4
(Netherlands) R Haase	6	6	6
(India) S Devvarman	6^{5}	2	3
4	(United Kingdom) A Murray	7^{7}	6	6

Second round
14	(Switzerland) S Wawrinka	6^{7}	6	6	3	6^{1}
WC	(United States) D Young	7^{9}	3	2	6	7^{7}
(Belgium) S Darcis	2	4	4
24	(Argentina) JI Chela	6	6	6
25	(Spain) F López	5	6	7^{7}	7^{7}
Q	(Canada) V Pospisil	7	4	6^{3}	6^{5}
(Netherlands) R Haase	7^{7}	6	2	0	4
4	(United Kingdom) A Murray	6^{5}	2	6	6	6

Third round
WC	(United States) D Young	7	6	6
24	(Argentina) JI Chela	5	4	3
25	(Spain) F López	1	4	2
4	(United Kingdom) A Murray	6	6	6

Fourth round
WC	(United States) D Young	2	3	3
4	(United Kingdom) A Murray	6	6	6

==== Section 7 ====
First round
5	(Spain) D Ferrer	2	6	6	6
(Russia) I Andreev	6	3	0	4
(United States) J Blake	6	6	4	6
Q	(Netherlands) J Huta Galung	4	2	6	4
(Belgium) O Rochus	6^{5}	2	4
Q	(Monaco) J-R Lisnard	7^{7}	6	6
(France) A Mannarino	2	0	1
26	(Germany) F Mayer	6	6	6
21	(United States) A Roddick	6	6	4	7
(United States) M Russell	2	4	6	5
WC	(United States) J Sock	6	6	1	6
(France) M Gicquel	4	3	6	4
(Uzbekistan) D Istomin	3	7	6	7^{7}
(United States) R Sweeting	6	5	4	6^{4}
WC	(France) J Benneteau	6	6	6
10	(Spain) N Almagro	2	4	3

Second round
5	(Spain) D Ferrer	6	6	6
(United States) J Blake	4	3	4
Q	(Monaco) J-R Lisnard	2	5	2
26	(Germany) F Mayer	6	7	6
21	(United States) A Roddick	6	6	6
WC	(United States) J Sock	3	3	4
(Uzbekistan) D Istomin	4	4	4
WC	(France) J Benneteau	6	6	6

Third round
5	(Spain) D Ferrer	6	6	7^{7}
26	(Germany) F Mayer	1	2	6^{2}
21	(United States) A Roddick	6	6	7^{7}
WC	(France) J Benneteau	1	4	6^{5}

Fourth round
5	(Spain) D Ferrer	3	4	6	3
21	(United States) A Roddick	6	6	3	6

==== Section 8 ====
First round
16	(Russia) M Youzhny	2	4	4
(Latvia) E Gulbis	6	6	6
(France) É Roger-Vasselin	6^{5}	4	4
(Luxembourg) G Müller	7^{7}	6	6
(Germany) M Bachinger	6	6	1	4	4
(Russia) I Kunitsyn	2	1	6	6	6
(France) É Prodon	2	6^{4}	2
17	(Austria) J Melzer	6	7^{7}	6
30	(Croatia) I Ljubičić	7^{7}	3	6	7
(Slovenia) B Kavčič	6^{5}	6	1	5
WC	(United States) B Reynolds	6	3	4	3
(Argentina) D Nalbandian	4	6	6	6
(France) N Mahut	3	6^{4}	6	6	6
Q	(Colombia) R Farah	6	7^{7}	2	4	0
(Kazakhstan) A Golubev	3	6^{1}	5
2	(Spain) R Nadal	6	7^{7}	7

Second round
(Latvia) E Gulbis	6	6^{4}	4	6^{5}
(Luxembourg) G Müller	3	7^{7}	6	7^{7}
(Russia) I Kunitsyn	3	6	1	6	7^{7}
17	(Austria) J Melzer	6	3	6	2	6^{5}
30	(Croatia) I Ljubičić	4	6	3	2
(Argentina) D Nalbandian	6	1	6	6
(France) N Mahut	2	2	0^{r}
2	(Spain) R Nadal	6	6	0

Third round
(Luxembourg) G Müller	6	6	6
(Russia) I Kunitsyn	1	4	4
(Argentina) D Nalbandian	6^{5}	1	5
2	(Spain) R Nadal	7^{7}	6	7

Fourth round
(Luxembourg) G Müller	6^{1}	1	2
2	(Spain) R Nadal	7^{7}	6	6

Preceded by 2011 Wimbledon Championships – Men's singles	Grand Slam men's singles	Succeeded by 2012 Australian Open – Men's singles
