= 2011 US Open – Mixed doubles =

Mixed doubles
- 2011 US Open

Final
- Champions: (United States) Melanie Oudin (United States) Jack Sock
- Runners-up: (Argentina) Gisela Dulko (Argentina) Eduardo Schwank
- Score: 7–6^{(7–4)}, 4–6, [10–8]

Details
- Draw: 32
- Seeds: 8

Events
Singles	men	women		boys	girls
Doubles	men	women	mixed	boys	girls
WC Singles	men	women	quad
WC Doubles	men	women	quad
Legends	men	women	mixed
- US Open

Liezel Huber and Bob Bryan were the defending champions, but they lost to Melanie Oudin and Jack Sock in the second round.

Oudin and Sock went on to win the title, defeating Gisela Dulko and Eduardo Schwank in the final 7–6^{(7–4)}, 4–6, [10–8].

== Seeds ==
1. (United States) Liezel Huber / (United States) Bob Bryan (second round)
2. (Slovenia) Katarina Srebotnik / (Canada) Daniel Nestor (second round)
3. (Kazakhstan) Yaroslava Shvedova / (Belarus) Max Mirnyi (first round)
4. (Czech Republic) Květa Peschke / (Pakistan) Aisam-ul-Haq Qureshi (withdrew)
5. (United States) Vania King / (India) Rohan Bopanna (first round)
6. (India) Sania Mirza / (India) Mahesh Bhupathi (first round)
7. (Russia) Elena Vesnina / (India) Leander Paes (semifinals, withdrew)
8. (Argentina) Gisela Dulko / (Argentina) Eduardo Schwank (final)

== Draw ==
Key

- Q = Qualifier
- WC = Wild card
- LL = Lucky loser
- Alt = Alternate
- ITF = ITF entry
- PR = Protected ranking
- SR = Special ranking
- SE = Special exempt
- JE = Junior exempt
- JR = Junior Accelerator Programme entrant
- CO = College Accelerator Programme entrant
- NG = Next Gen Accelerator Program entrant
- w/o = Walkover
- r = Retired
- d = Defaulted

=== Finals ===
Semifinals
WC	(United States) Melanie Oudin (United States) Jack Sock	w/o
7	(Russia) Elena Vesnina (India) Leander Paes
8	(Argentina) Gisela Dulko (Argentina) Eduardo Schwank	6	6
(Czech Republic) Lucie Hradecká (Czech Republic) František Čermák	4	4

Final
WC	(United States) Melanie Oudin (United States) Jack Sock	7^{7}	4	[10]
8	(Argentina) Gisela Dulko (Argentina) Eduardo Schwank	6^{4}	6	[8]

=== Top half ===
First round
1	(United States) L Huber (United States) B Bryan	7	6
(Australia) A Rodionova (Germany) C Kas	5	4
WC	(United States) M Oudin (United States) J Sock	6	0	[11]
(Czech Republic) V Uhlířová (Slovakia) F Polášek	4	6	[9]
(Slovakia) D Hantuchová (The Bahamas) M Knowles	6	7
WC	(United States) C Fusano (United States) D Martin	2	5
(Czech Republic) B Záhlavová-Strýcová (Germany) P Petzschner	7^{7}	4	[10]
5	(United States) V King (India) R Bopanna	6^{1}	6	[7]
3	(Kazakhstan) Y Shvedova (Belarus) M Mirnyi	6	3	[7]
(Belarus) O Govortsova (Poland) M Matkowski	4	6	[10]
(South Africa) N Grandin (Curaçao) J-J Rojer	6^{6}	6	[10]
WC	(United States) T Townsend (United States) D Young	7^{8}	2	[8]
(Chinese Taipei) Y-J Chan (Poland) M Fyrstenberg	6	6
(Serbia) A Ivanovic (Serbia) N Zimonjić	3	4
(Russia) N Petrova (United Kingdom) J Murray	2	7^{9}	[6]
7	(Russia) E Vesnina (India) L Paes	6	6^{7}	[10]

Second round
1	(United States) L Huber (United States) B Bryan	6	3	[6]
WC	(United States) M Oudin (United States) J Sock	2	6	[10]
(Slovakia) D Hantuchová (The Bahamas) M Knowles	4	3
(Czech Republic) B Záhlavová-Strýcová (Germany) P Petzschner	6	6
(Belarus) O Govortsova (Poland) M Matkowski	7^{7}	6
(South Africa) N Grandin (Curaçao) J-J Rojer	6^{4}	2
(Chinese Taipei) Y-J Chan (Poland) M Fyrstenberg	2	7^{9}	[4]
7	(Russia) E Vesnina (India) L Paes	6	6^{7}	[10]

Quarterfinals
WC	(United States) M Oudin (United States) J Sock	6	7^{7}
(Czech Republic) B Záhlavová-Strýcová (Germany) P Petzschner	3	6^{3}
(Belarus) O Govortsova (Poland) M Matkowski	2	4
7	(Russia) E Vesnina (India) L Paes	6	6

Semifinals
WC	(United States) M Oudin (United States) J Sock	w/o
7	(Russia) E Vesnina (India) L Paes

=== Bottom half ===
First round
8	(Argentina) G Dulko (Argentina) E Schwank	6	5	[10]
WC	(United States) C Vandeweghe (United States) E Butorac	4	7	[5]
WC	(United States) M Washington (United States) M Russell	6^{4}	1
(Spain) N Llagostera Vives (Austria) O Marach	7^{7}	6
(Italy) F Pennetta (Italy) D Bracciali	0	1
(United States) L Raymond (United States) S Lipsky	6	6
(Australia) J Gajdošová (Brazil) B Soares	6	6
Alt	(Austria) T Paszek (Austria) A Peya	3	4
6	(India) S Mirza (India) M Bhupathi	3	6^{5}
(Czech Republic) L Hradecká (Czech Republic) F Čermák	6	7^{7}
WC	(United States) R Kops-Jones (United States) R Ram	3	6	[10]
WC	(United States) A Spears (United States) T Parrott	6	3	[6]
(Czech Republic) A Hlaváčková (Romania) H Tecău	3	2
WC	(United States) I Falconi (United States) S Johnson	6	6
(Czech Republic) I Benešová (Austria) J Melzer	1	6	[7]
2	(Slovenia) K Srebotnik (Canada) D Nestor	6	3	[10]

Second round
8	(Argentina) G Dulko (Argentina) E Schwank	6	6
(Spain) N Llagostera Vives (Austria) O Marach	4	3
(United States) L Raymond (United States) S Lipsky	4	6^{3}
(Australia) J Gajdošová (Brazil) B Soares	6	7^{7}
(Czech Republic) L Hradecká (Czech Republic) F Čermák	7	7
WC	(United States) R Kops-Jones (United States) R Ram	5	5
WC	(United States) I Falconi (United States) S Johnson	6	3	[10]
2	(Slovenia) K Srebotnik (Canada) D Nestor	4	6	[8]

Quarterfinals
8	(Argentina) G Dulko (Argentina) E Schwank	3	6	[10]
(Australia) J Gajdošová (Brazil) B Soares	6	3	[8]
(Czech Republic) L Hradecká (Czech Republic) F Čermák	7	7
WC	(United States) I Falconi (United States) S Johnson	5	5

Semifinals
8	(Argentina) G Dulko (Argentina) E Schwank	6	6
(Czech Republic) L Hradecká (Czech Republic) F Čermák	4	4
