= 2011 US Open – Women's singles =

Women's singles
- 2011 US Open

Final
- Champion: (Australia) Samantha Stosur
- Runner-up: (United States) Serena Williams
- Score: 6–2, 6–3

Details
- Draw: 128
- Seeds: 32

Events
Singles	men	women		boys	girls
Doubles	men	women	mixed	boys	girls
WC Singles	men	women	quad
WC Doubles	men	women	quad
Legends	men	women	mixed
← 2010 ·	US Open	· 2012 →

Samantha Stosur defeated Serena Williams in the final, 6–2, 6–3 to win the women's singles tennis title at the 2011 US Open. It was her first and only major singles title. Stosur was the first Australian woman to win a major since Evonne Goolagong Cawley at the 1980 Wimbledon Championships, and the first to win the US Open since Margaret Court in 1973.

Kim Clijsters was the two-time reigning champion, but withdrew due to an abdominal injury.

This was the first time in the tournament's history where no Americans were among the top ten seeds.

This tournament marked the first major appearance of future Australian Open champion Madison Keys, who was awarded a wildcard; she lost to Lucie Šafářová in the second round.

== Seeds ==
1. (Denmark) Caroline Wozniacki (semifinals)
2. (Russia) Vera Zvonareva (quarterfinals)
3. (Russia) Maria Sharapova (third round)
4. (Belarus) Victoria Azarenka (third round)
5. (Czech Republic) Petra Kvitová (first round)
6. (China) Li Na (first round)
7. (Italy) Francesca Schiavone (fourth round)
8. (France) Marion Bartoli (second round)
9. (Australia) Samantha Stosur (champion)
10. (Germany) Andrea Petkovic (quarterfinals)
11. (Serbia) Jelena Janković (third round)
12. (Poland) Agnieszka Radwańska (second round)
13. (China) Peng Shuai (fourth round)
14. (Slovakia) Dominika Cibulková (second round)
15. (Russia) Svetlana Kuznetsova (fourth round)
16. (Serbia) Ana Ivanovic (fourth round)
17. (Russia) Anastasia Pavlyuchenkova (quarterfinals)
18. (Italy) Roberta Vinci (third round)
19. (Germany) Julia Görges (third round)
20. (Belgium) Yanina Wickmayer (second round, retired because of a back injury)
21. (Slovakia) Daniela Hantuchová (first round)
22. (Germany) Sabine Lisicki (fourth round)
23. (Israel) Shahar Pe'er (second round)
24. (Russia) Nadia Petrova (third round)
25. (Russia) Maria Kirilenko (fourth round)
26. (Italy) Flavia Pennetta (quarterfinals)
27. (Czech Republic) Lucie Šafářová (third round)
28. (United States) Serena Williams (final)
29. (Australia) Jarmila Gajdošová (second round)
30. (Spain) Anabel Medina Garrigues (third round)
31. (Estonia) Kaia Kanepi (second round)
32. (Spain) María José Martínez Sánchez (first round)

== Main draw ==
=== Key ===
- Q = Qualifier
- WC = Wild card
- LL = Lucky loser
- Alt = Alternate
- ITF = ITF entry
- PR = Protected ranking
- SR = Special ranking
- SE = Special exempt
- JE = Junior exempt
- JR = Junior Accelerator Programme entrant
- CO = College Accelerator Programme entrant
- NG = Next Gen Accelerator Program entrant
- w/o = Walkover
- r = Retired
- d = Defaulted

=== Finals ===
Quarterfinals
1	(Denmark) Caroline Wozniacki	6	7^{7}
10	(Germany) Andrea Petkovic	1	6^{5}
28/PR	(United States) Serena Williams	7	6
17	(Russia) Anastasia Pavlyuchenkova	5	1
(Germany) Angelique Kerber	6	4	6
26	(Italy) Flavia Pennetta	4	6	3
9	(Australia) Samantha Stosur	6	6
2	(Russia) Vera Zvonareva	3	3

Semifinals
1	(Denmark) Caroline Wozniacki	2	4
28/PR	(United States) Serena Williams	6	6
(Germany) Angelique Kerber	3	6	2
9	(Australia) Samantha Stosur	6	2	6

Final
28/PR	(United States) Serena Williams	2	3
9	(Australia) Samantha Stosur	6	6

=== Top half ===
==== Section 1 ====
First round
1	(Denmark) C Wozniacki	6	6
(Spain) N Llagostera Vives	3	1
(Netherlands) A Rus	6	6
(Russia) E Vesnina	2	4
(United States) V King	6	6
(Hungary) G Arn	1	4
(Czech Republic) I Benešová	6^{5}	5
29	(Australia) J Gajdošová	7^{7}	7
21	(Slovakia) D Hantuchová	2	3
(France) P Parmentier	6	6
(Uzbekistan) A Amanmuradova	6	6
(Austria) T Paszek	4	2
WC	(United States) J Hampton	6	2	1^{r}
(United Kingdom) E Baltacha	2	6	5
(Italy) S Errani	5	1
15	(Russia) S Kuznetsova	7	6

Second round
1	(Denmark) C Wozniacki	6	6
(Netherlands) A Rus	2	0
(United States) V King	6	6
29	(Australia) J Gajdošová	2	0
(France) P Parmentier	3	5
(Uzbekistan) A Amanmuradova	6	7
(United Kingdom) E Baltacha	4	3
15	(Russia) S Kuznetsova	6	6

Third round
1	(Denmark) C Wozniacki	6	6
(United States) V King	2	4
(Uzbekistan) A Amanmuradova	4	2
15	(Russia) S Kuznetsova	6	6

Fourth round
1	(Denmark) C Wozniacki	6^{6}	7	6
15	(Russia) S Kuznetsova	7^{8}	5	1

==== Section 2 ====
First round
10	(Germany) A Petkovic	6	6
Q	(Russia) E Bychkova	2	2
Q	(Russia) V Diatchenko	6	5	2
(China) J Zheng	4	7	6
WC	(Australia) C Dellacqua	5	0
(France) A Cornet	7	6
(Romania) I-C Begu	3	4
18	(Italy) R Vinci	6	6
31	(Estonia) K Kanepi	6	6
(Thailand) T Tanasugarn	4	3
(Japan) K Date-Krumm	6^{5}	6^{2}
Q	(Spain) S Soler Espinosa	7^{7}	7^{7}
(France) M Johansson	2	6	5
(Spain) C Suárez Navarro	6	4	7
(Romania) S Halep	6	7
6	(China) N Li	2	5

Second round
10	(Germany) A Petkovic	3	6	6
(China) J Zheng	6	3	3
(France) A Cornet	2	3
18	(Italy) R Vinci	6	6
31	(Estonia) K Kanepi	4	2
Q	(Spain) S Soler Espinosa	6	6
(Spain) C Suárez Navarro	3	6	6
(Romania) S Halep	6	2	2

Third round
10	(Germany) A Petkovic	6	6
18	(Italy) R Vinci	4	0
Q	(Spain) S Soler Espinosa	0	4
(Spain) C Suárez Navarro	6	6

Fourth round
10	(Germany) A Petkovic	6	6
(Spain) C Suárez Navarro	1	4

==== Section 3 ====
First round
4	(Belarus) V Azarenka	6	6
(Sweden) J Larsson	1	3
(Canada) R Marino	3	3
(Argentina) G Dulko	6	6
Q	(Netherlands) M Krajicek	3	7^{7}	6
(Greece) E Daniilidou	6	6^{4}	1
(Serbia) B Jovanovski	1	1
28/PR	(United States) S Williams	6	6
23	(Israel) S Pe'er	6^{5}	6	6
(India) S Mirza	7^{7}	3	1
Q	(Hungary) RL Jani	2	6	6^{3}
WC	(United States) S Stephens	6	3	7^{7}
(Russia) E Rodina	6	1	2
(Czech Republic) P Cetkovská	1	6	6
(Russia) K Pervak	4	2
16	(Serbia) A Ivanovic	6	6

Second round
4	(Belarus) V Azarenka	6	6
(Argentina) G Dulko	4	3
Q	(Netherlands) M Krajicek	0	1
28/PR	(United States) S Williams	6	6
23	(Israel) S Pe'er	1	6^{4}
WC	(United States) S Stephens	6	7^{7}
(Czech Republic) P Cetkovská
16	(Serbia) A Ivanovic	w/o

Third round
4	(Belarus) V Azarenka	1	6^{5}
28/PR	(United States) S Williams	6	7^{7}
WC	(United States) S Stephens	3	4
16	(Serbia) A Ivanovic	6	6

Fourth round
28/PR	(United States) S Williams	6	6
16	(Serbia) A Ivanovic	3	4

==== Section 4 ====
First round
11	(Serbia) J Janković	6	6
WC	(United States) A Riske	2	0
(Australia) J Dokić	6	6
(Belarus) O Govortsova	3	1
(Croatia) P Martić	5	6	6
(Czech Republic) B Záhlavová-Strýcová	7	3	4
(Georgia (country)) A Tatishvili	2	2
17	(Russia) A Pavlyuchenkova	6	6
32	(Spain) MJ Martínez Sánchez	3	4
(Germany) M Barthel	6	6
(South Africa) C Scheepers	7	6
(United Kingdom) A Keothavong	5	3
(Croatia) M Lučić	6	2	6
Q	(New Zealand) M Erakovic	4	6	4
Q	(Kazakhstan) G Voskoboeva	3	6	4
7	(Italy) F Schiavone	6	1	6

Second round
11	(Serbia) J Janković	6	6
(Australia) J Dokić	3	4
(Croatia) P Martić	4	6	4
17	(Russia) A Pavlyuchenkova	6	2	6
(Germany) M Barthel	4	5
(South Africa) C Scheepers	6	7
(Croatia) M Lučić	1	1
7	(Italy) F Schiavone	6	6

Third round
11	(Serbia) J Janković	4	4
17	(Russia) A Pavlyuchenkova	6	6
(South Africa) C Scheepers	7	6^{5}	3
7	(Italy) F Schiavone	5	7^{7}	6

Fourth round
17	(Russia) A Pavlyuchenkova	5	6	6
7	(Italy) F Schiavone	7	3	4

=== Bottom half ===
==== Section 5 ====
First round
5	(Czech Republic) P Kvitová	6^{3}	3
(Romania) A Dulgheru	7^{7}	6
(Austria) P Mayr-Achleitner	3	3
(Romania) M Niculescu	6	6
WC	(United States) J Craybas	2	4
WC	(United States) M Keys	6	6
(Slovakia) M Rybáriková	6	3	2
27	(Czech Republic) L Šafářová	2	6	6
20	(Belgium) Y Wickmayer	6	7
(Romania) S Cîrstea	1	5
(Russia) A Kudryavtseva	7^{7}	7
(Australia) An Rodionova	6^{1}	5
WC	(United States) L Davis	6^{3}	3
(Germany) A Kerber	7^{7}	6
Q	(Poland) U Radwańska	2	3
12	(Poland) A Radwańska	6	6

Second round
(Romania) A Dulgheru	3	0
(Romania) M Niculescu	6	6
WC	(United States) M Keys	6	5	4
27	(Czech Republic) L Šafářová	3	7	6
20	(Belgium) Y Wickmayer	1	0^{r}
(Russia) A Kudryavtseva	6	3
(Germany) A Kerber	6	4	6
12	(Poland) A Radwańska	3	6	3

Third round
(Romania) M Niculescu	6	6
27	(Czech Republic) L Šafářová	0	1
(Russia) A Kudryavtseva	3	1
(Germany) A Kerber	6	6

Fourth round
(Romania) M Niculescu	4	3
(Germany) A Kerber	6	6

==== Section 6 ====
First round
13	(China) S Peng	6	6
(United States) V Lepchenko	3	4
(France) V Razzano	2	3
(Bulgaria) T Pironkova	6	6
(Japan) M Doi	2	7^{14}	2^{r}
(Spain) L Pous Tió	6	6^{12}	5
(Germany) K Barrois	3	2
19	(Germany) J Görges	6	6
26	(Italy) F Pennetta	6	6
WC	(France) A Rezaï	1	4
(United States) M Oudin	0	6^{7}
Q	(Italy) R Oprandi	6	7^{9}
(Belarus) A Yakimova	6	4	6
Q	(Thailand) N Lertcheewakarn	0	6	3
(United Kingdom) H Watson	6	5	3
3	(Russia) M Sharapova	3	7	6

Second round
13	(China) S Peng	6	6
(Bulgaria) T Pironkova	2	4
(Spain) L Pous Tió	3	1
19	(Germany) J Görges	6	6
26	(Italy) F Pennetta	6	6
Q	(Italy) R Oprandi	0	3
(Belarus) A Yakimova	1	1
3	(Russia) M Sharapova	6	6

Third round
13	(China) S Peng	6	7^{7}
19	(Germany) J Görges	4	6^{1}
26	(Italy) F Pennetta	6	3	6
3	(Russia) M Sharapova	3	6	4

Fourth round
13	(China) S Peng	4	6^{6}
26	(Italy) F Pennetta	6	7^{8}

==== Section 7 ====
First round
8	(France) M Bartoli	7	6
Q	(Russia) A Panova	5	3
(United States) C McHale	6	6^{5}	6
Q	(Canada) A Wozniak	3	7^{7}	4
(Russia) V Dushevina	6	6
(Latvia) A Sevastova	3	4
(Russia) E Makarova	6	1	6^{3}
25	(Russia) M Kirilenko	4	6	7^{7}
24	(Russia) N Petrova	6	1	6
Q	(Chinese Taipei) Y-j Chan	3	6	4
(United States) B Mattek-Sands	1	3
(Slovenia) P Hercog	6	6
(United States) C Vandeweghe	7	6
(Italy) A Brianti	5	3
(Sweden) S Arvidsson	2	3
9	(Australia) S Stosur	6	6

Second round
8	(France) M Bartoli	6^{2}	2
(United States) C McHale	7^{7}	6
(Russia) V Dushevina	1	2
25	(Russia) M Kirilenko	6	6
24	(Russia) N Petrova	6	6
(Slovenia) P Hercog	2	4
(United States) C Vandeweghe	3	4
9	(Australia) S Stosur	6	6

Third round
(United States) C McHale	2	3
25	(Russia) M Kirilenko	6	6
24	(Russia) N Petrova	6^{5}	7^{7}	5
9	(Australia) S Stosur	7^{7}	6^{5}	7

Fourth round
25	(Russia) M Kirilenko	2	7^{17}	3
9	(Australia) S Stosur	6	6^{15}	6

==== Section 8 ====
First round
14	(Slovakia) D Cibulková	6	6
(China) S Zhang	3	4
(Czech Republic) K Zakopalová	6	4	2
(United States) I Falconi	3	6	6
(Russia) V Dolonc	4	3
(United States) V Williams	6	6
PR	(Ukraine) A Bondarenko	3	3
22	(Germany) S Lisicki	6	6
30	(Spain) A Medina Garrigues	6^{4}	6	6
Q	(Italy) K Knapp	7^{7}	4	3
Q	(United Kingdom) L Robson	7^{7}	1
(Japan) A Morita	6^{5}	0^{r}
(Czech Republic) L Hradecká	3	0
(Ukraine) K Bondarenko	6	6
Q	(France) S Foretz Gacon	3	0
2	(Russia) V Zvonareva	6	6

Second round
14	(Slovakia) D Cibulková	6	3	5
(United States) I Falconi	2	6	7
(United States) V Williams	w/o
22	(Germany) S Lisicki
30	(Spain) A Medina Garrigues	6	6
Q	(United Kingdom) L Robson	2	3
(Ukraine) K Bondarenko	5	6	3
2	(Russia) V Zvonareva	7	3	6

Third round
(United States) I Falconi	0	1
22	(Germany) S Lisicki	6	6
30	(Spain) A Medina Garrigues	4	5
2	(Russia) V Zvonareva	6	7

Fourth round
22	(Germany) S Lisicki	2	3
2	(Russia) V Zvonareva	6	6

== Championship match statistics ==
Category	(Australia) Stosur	(United States) S. Williams
1st serve %	29/46 (63%)	31/56 (55%)
1st serve points won	22 of 29 = 76%	20 of 31 = 65%
2nd serve points won	10 of 17 = 59%	7 of 25 = 28%
Total service points won	32 of 46 = 69.57%	27 of 56 = 48.21%
Aces	2	5
Double faults	1	2
Winners	20	19
Unforced errors	12	25
Net points won	9 of 13 = 69%	6 of 11 = 55%
Break points converted	5 of 9 = 56%	1 of 5 = 20%
Return points won	29 of 56 = 52%	14 of 46 = 30%
Total points won	61	41

Preceded by 2011 Wimbledon Championships – Women's singles	Grand Slam women's singles	Succeeded by 2012 Australian Open – Women's singles
