= 2011 US Open – Women's doubles =

Women's doubles
- 2011 US Open

Final
- Champion: (United States) Liezel Huber (United States) Lisa Raymond
- Runner-up: (United States) Vania King (Kazakhstan) Yaroslava Shvedova
- Score: 4–6, 7–6^{(7–5)}, 7–6^{(7–3)}

Details
- Draw: 64 (7 WC )
- Seeds: 16

Events
Singles	men	women		boys	girls
Doubles	men	women	mixed	boys	girls
WC Singles	men	women	quad
WC Doubles	men	women	quad
Legends	men	women	mixed
← 2010 ·	US Open	· 2012 →

Vania King and Yaroslava Shvedova were the defending champions and they reached the final. Liezel Huber and Lisa Raymond defeated them 4–6, 7–6^{(7–5)}, 7–6^{(7–3)} to win the title.

== Seeds ==
1. (Czech Republic) Květa Peschke / (Slovenia) Katarina Srebotnik (quarterfinals)
2. (Argentina) Gisela Dulko / (Italy) Flavia Pennetta (third round)
3. (United States) Vania King / (Kazakhstan) Yaroslava Shvedova (final)
4. (United States) Liezel Huber / (United States) Lisa Raymond (champions)
5. (Russia) Maria Kirilenko / (Russia) Nadia Petrova (semifinals)
6. (India) Sania Mirza / (Russia) Elena Vesnina (third round)
7. (China) Peng Shuai / (China) Zheng Jie (first round)
8. (Czech Republic) Andrea Hlaváčková / (Czech Republic) Lucie Hradecká (quarterfinals)
9. (Czech Republic) Iveta Benešová / (Czech Republic) Barbora Záhlavová-Strýcová (quarterfinals)
10. (Chinese Taipei) Chan Yung-jan / (Australia) Anastasia Rodionova (first round)
11. (South Africa) Natalie Grandin / (Czech Republic) Vladimíra Uhlířová (first round)
12. (Spain) María José Martínez Sánchez / (Spain) Anabel Medina Garrigues (third round)
13. (Chinese Taipei) Chuang Chia-jung / (Belarus) Olga Govortsova (first round)
14. (Spain) Nuria Llagostera Vives / (Spain) Arantxa Parra Santonja (second round)
15. (Italy) Sara Errani / (Italy) Roberta Vinci (quarterfinals)
16. (Australia) Jarmila Gajdošová / (United States) Bethanie Mattek-Sands (third round)

== Draw ==
=== Key ===
- Q = Qualifier
- WC = Wild card
- LL = Lucky loser
- Alt = Alternate
- ITF = ITF entry
- PR = Protected ranking
- SR = Special ranking
- SE = Special exempt
- JE = Junior exempt
- JR = Junior Accelerator Programme entrant
- CO = College Accelerator Programme entrant
- NG = Next Gen Accelerator Program entrant
- w/o = Walkover
- r = Retired
- d = Defaulted

=== Finals ===
Quarterfinals
1	(Czech Republic) Květa Peschke (Slovenia) Katarina Srebotnik	2	3
5	(Russia) Maria Kirilenko (Russia) Nadia Petrova	6	6
3	(United States) Vania King (Kazakhstan) Yaroslava Shvedova	6	7
8	(Czech Republic) Andrea Hlaváčková (Czech Republic) Lucie Hradecká	4	5
9	(Czech Republic) Iveta Benešová (Czech Republic) Barbora Záhlavová-Strýcová	1	4
4	(United States) Liezel Huber (United States) Lisa Raymond	6	6
(Slovakia) Daniela Hantuchová (Poland) Agnieszka Radwańska	6	7^{7}
15	(Italy) Sara Errani (Italy) Roberta Vinci	3	6^{3}

Semifinals
5	(Russia) Maria Kirilenko (Russia) Nadia Petrova	6^{7}	6	3
3	(United States) Vania King (Kazakhstan) Yaroslava Shvedova	7^{9}	2	6
4	(United States) Liezel Huber (United States) Lisa Raymond	6	6
(Slovakia) Daniela Hantuchová (Poland) Agnieszka Radwańska	2	4

Final
3	(United States) Vania King (Kazakhstan) Yaroslava Shvedova	6	6^{5}	6^{3}
4	(United States) Liezel Huber (United States) Lisa Raymond	4	7^{7}	7^{7}

=== Top half ===
==== Section 1 ====
First round
1	(Czech Republic) K Peschke (Slovenia) K Srebotnik	6	6
(Italy) A Brianti (Russia) M Kondratieva	1	3
(United States) I Falconi (Romania) E Gallovits-Hall	1	0
(Ukraine) A Bondarenko (Ukraine) K Bondarenko	6	6
(Chinese Taipei) S-w Hsieh (Kazakhstan) G Voskoboeva	6	7^{7}
(Hungary) G Arn (Netherlands) A Rus	4	6^{3}
(Bulgaria) T Pironkova (South Africa) C Scheepers	3	1
14	(Spain) N Llagostera Vives (Spain) A Parra Santonja	6	6
12	(Spain) MJ Martínez Sánchez (Spain) A Medina Garrigues	6	6
(France) M Johansson (France) P Parmentier	1	3
(Romania) S Cîrstea (Japan) A Morita	7	4	6
(Australia) C Dellacqua (Australia) R Stubbs	5	6	2
(Russia) A Pavlyuchenkova (Russia) V Zvonareva	6	6
(Croatia) M Lučić (Austria) T Paszek	1	2
(Canada) R Marino (United States) C McHale	1	1
5	(Russia) M Kirilenko (Russia) N Petrova	6	6

Second round
1	(Czech Republic) K Peschke (Slovenia) K Srebotnik	6	6
(Ukraine) A Bondarenko (Ukraine) K Bondarenko	1	2
(Chinese Taipei) S-w Hsieh (Kazakhstan) G Voskoboeva	6	6
14	(Spain) N Llagostera Vives (Spain) A Parra Santonja	2	2
12	(Spain) MJ Martínez Sánchez (Spain) A Medina Garrigues	5	6	6
(Romania) S Cîrstea (Japan) A Morita	7	3	4
(Russia) A Pavlyuchenkova (Russia) V Zvonareva
5	(Russia) M Kirilenko (Russia) N Petrova	w/o

Third round
1	(Czech Republic) K Peschke (Slovenia) K Srebotnik	6	6
(Chinese Taipei) S-w Hsieh (Kazakhstan) G Voskoboeva	3	1
12	(Spain) MJ Martínez Sánchez (Spain) A Medina Garrigues	2	3
5	(Russia) M Kirilenko (Russia) N Petrova	6	6

Quarterfinals
1	(Czech Republic) K Peschke (Slovenia) K Srebotnik	2	3
5	(Russia) M Kirilenko (Russia) N Petrova	6	6

==== Section 2 ====
First round
3	(United States) V King (Kazakhstan) Y Shvedova	6	6
(Czech Republic) P Cetkovská (Czech Republic) R Voráčová	1	2
(Greece) E Daniilidou (Slovenia) P Hercog	6^{5}	6	6
(Germany) S Lisicki (Australia) S Stosur	7^{7}	3	3
WC	(United States) J Pegula (United States) T Townsend	6	6
(Poland) K Jans-Ignacik (Poland) A Rosolska	2	3
(Latvia) L Dekmeijere (Serbia) J Janković	6	6
13	(Chinese Taipei) C-J Chuang (Belarus) O Govortsova	2	2
10	(Chinese Taipei) Y-J Chan (Australia) A Rodionova	6	4	6^{7}
(Slovenia) A Klepač (Georgia (country)) A Tatishvili	4	6	7^{9}
WC	(United States) A Glatch (United States) J Hampton	4	4
WC	(United States) H Barte (United States) M Burdette	6	6
WC	(United States) L Davis (United States) N Gibbs	4	1
(Germany) J Görges (Germany) A Petkovic	6	6
(Serbia) B Jovanovski (United States) V Lepchenko	0	5
8	(Czech Republic) A Hlaváčková (Czech Republic) L Hradecká	6	7

Second round
3	(United States) V King (Kazakhstan) Y Shvedova	6	6
(Greece) E Daniilidou (Slovenia) P Hercog	2	2
WC	(United States) J Pegula (United States) T Townsend	6	6
(Latvia) L Dekmeijere (Serbia) J Janković	3	3
(Slovenia) A Klepač (Georgia (country)) A Tatishvili	6	3	6
WC	(United States) H Barte (United States) M Burdette	2	6	3
(Germany) J Görges (Germany) A Petkovic	4	7^{7}	4
8	(Czech Republic) A Hlaváčková (Czech Republic) L Hradecká	6	6^{3}	6

Third round
3	(United States) V King (Kazakhstan) Y Shvedova	6	6
WC	(United States) J Pegula (United States) T Townsend	4	2
(Slovenia) A Klepač (Georgia (country)) A Tatishvili	6	3	3
8	(Czech Republic) A Hlaváčková (Czech Republic) L Hradecká	3	6	6

Quarterfinals
3	(United States) V King (Kazakhstan) Y Shvedova	6	7
8	(Czech Republic) A Hlaváčková (Czech Republic) L Hradecká	4	5

=== Bottom half ===
==== Section 3 ====
First round
6	(India) S Mirza (Russia) E Vesnina	6	6
WC	(United States) S Crawford (United States) M Keys	2	0
(Croatia) P Martić (Russia) K Pervak	3	6	2
(Russia) V Diatchenko (Ukraine) O Savchuk	6	1	6
(Czech Republic) E Birnerová (Czech Republic) K Zakopalová	6^{5}	3
(Romania) I-C Begu (Romania) S Halep	7^{7}	6
(Romania) M Niculescu (Israel) S Pe'er	7	4	5
9	(Czech Republic) I Benešová (Czech Republic) B Záhlavová-Strýcová	5	6	7
16	(Australia) J Gajdošová (United States) B Mattek-Sands	6	6
(Australia) J Dokić (France) V Razzano	2	4
(Romania) A Dulgheru (Slovakia) M Rybáriková	4	4
(Ukraine) M Koryttseva (Belarus) T Poutchek	6	6
(New Zealand) M Erakovic (Thailand) T Tanasugarn	4	6	4
Alt	(Uzbekistan) A Amanmuradova (Russia) A Panova	6	3	6
(United States) R Kops-Jones (United States) A Spears	2	2
4	(United States) L Huber (United States) L Raymond	6	6

Second round
6	(India) S Mirza (Russia) E Vesnina	6	7^{7}
(Russia) V Diatchenko (Ukraine) O Savchuk	1	6^{5}
(Romania) I-C Begu (Romania) S Halep	7^{7}	0	2^{r}
9	(Czech Republic) I Benešová (Czech Republic) B Záhlavová-Strýcová	6^{5}	6	4
16	(Australia) J Gajdošová (United States) B Mattek-Sands	5	6	6
(Ukraine) M Koryttseva (Belarus) T Poutchek	7	1	4
Alt	(Uzbekistan) A Amanmuradova (Russia) A Panova	2	1
4	(United States) L Huber (United States) L Raymond	6	6

Third round
6	(India) S Mirza (Russia) E Vesnina	6^{4}	6^{5}
9	(Czech Republic) I Benešová (Czech Republic) B Záhlavová-Strýcová	7^{7}	7^{7}
16	(Australia) J Gajdošová (United States) B Mattek-Sands	2	6^{5}
4	(United States) L Huber (United States) L Raymond	6	7^{7}

Quarterfinals
9	(Czech Republic) I Benešová (Czech Republic) B Záhlavová-Strýcová	1	4
4	(United States) L Huber (United States) L Raymond	6	6

==== Section 4 ====
First round
7	(China) S Peng (China) J Zheng	0	6	4
(Slovakia) D Hantuchová (Poland) A Radwańska	6	4	6
(Netherlands) M Krajicek (Czech Republic) L Šafářová	6	4	2
(Germany) K Barrois (Germany) A-L Grönefeld	4	6	6
(Slovakia) D Cibulková (Italy) F Schiavone	6	7
(Sweden) J Larsson (Germany) J Wöhr	1	5
(Russia) A Kudryavtseva (Russia) E Makarova	6	3	6
11	(South Africa) N Grandin (Czech Republic) V Uhlířová	4	6	3
15	(Italy) S Errani (Italy) R Vinci	6	6
(Japan) S Aoyama (Belarus) A Yakimova	2	1
(Spain) L Pous Tió (Spain) C Suárez Navarro	0	r
(Latvia) A Sevastova (China) S Zhang	3
WC	(United States) M Oudin (United States) A Rolle	2	1
(Sweden) S Arvidsson (Russia) V Dushevina	6	6
WC	(United States) A Riske (United States) S Stephens	3	0
2	(Argentina) G Dulko (Italy) F Pennetta	6	6

Second round
(Slovakia) D Hantuchová (Poland) A Radwańska	3	6	6
(Germany) K Barrois (Germany) A-L Grönefeld	6	2	0
(Slovakia) D Cibulková (Italy) F Schiavone
(Russia) A Kudryavtseva (Russia) E Makarova	w/o
15	(Italy) S Errani (Italy) R Vinci	6	6
(Latvia) A Sevastova (China) S Zhang	0	4
(Sweden) S Arvidsson (Russia) V Dushevina	4	1
2	(Argentina) G Dulko (Italy) F Pennetta	6	6

Third round
(Slovakia) D Hantuchová (Poland) A Radwańska	6	4	6
(Russia) A Kudryavtseva (Russia) E Makarova	3	6	2
15	(Italy) S Errani (Italy) R Vinci	4	7	6
2	(Argentina) G Dulko (Italy) F Pennetta	6	5	2

Quarterfinals
(Slovakia) D Hantuchová (Poland) A Radwańska	6	7^{7}
15	(Italy) S Errani (Italy) R Vinci	3	6^{3}
