= Melbourne Park =

Sports complex in Melbourne, Australia

Coordinates: 37°49′22″S 144°58′48″E

Melbourne Park is a sporting venue in the Melbourne Sports and Entertainment Precinct in Melbourne, Victoria, Australia. Since 1988, Melbourne Park has been home of the Australian Open tennis tournament played annually in January. The park has multiple venues where the Australian Open matches take place. Rod Laver Arena is the largest venue with a capacity of 15,000, while John Cain Arena seats 10,500 and Margaret Court Arena 7,500. The three venues feature retractable roofs, allowing events to be played indoors or outdoors. Other venues include Show Court 3 and 1573 Arena which both have a 3,000 seating capacity, and the new 5,000-seat Kia Arena, which opened in 2022. In total there are 35 outdoor Greenset tennis courts at Melbourne Park.

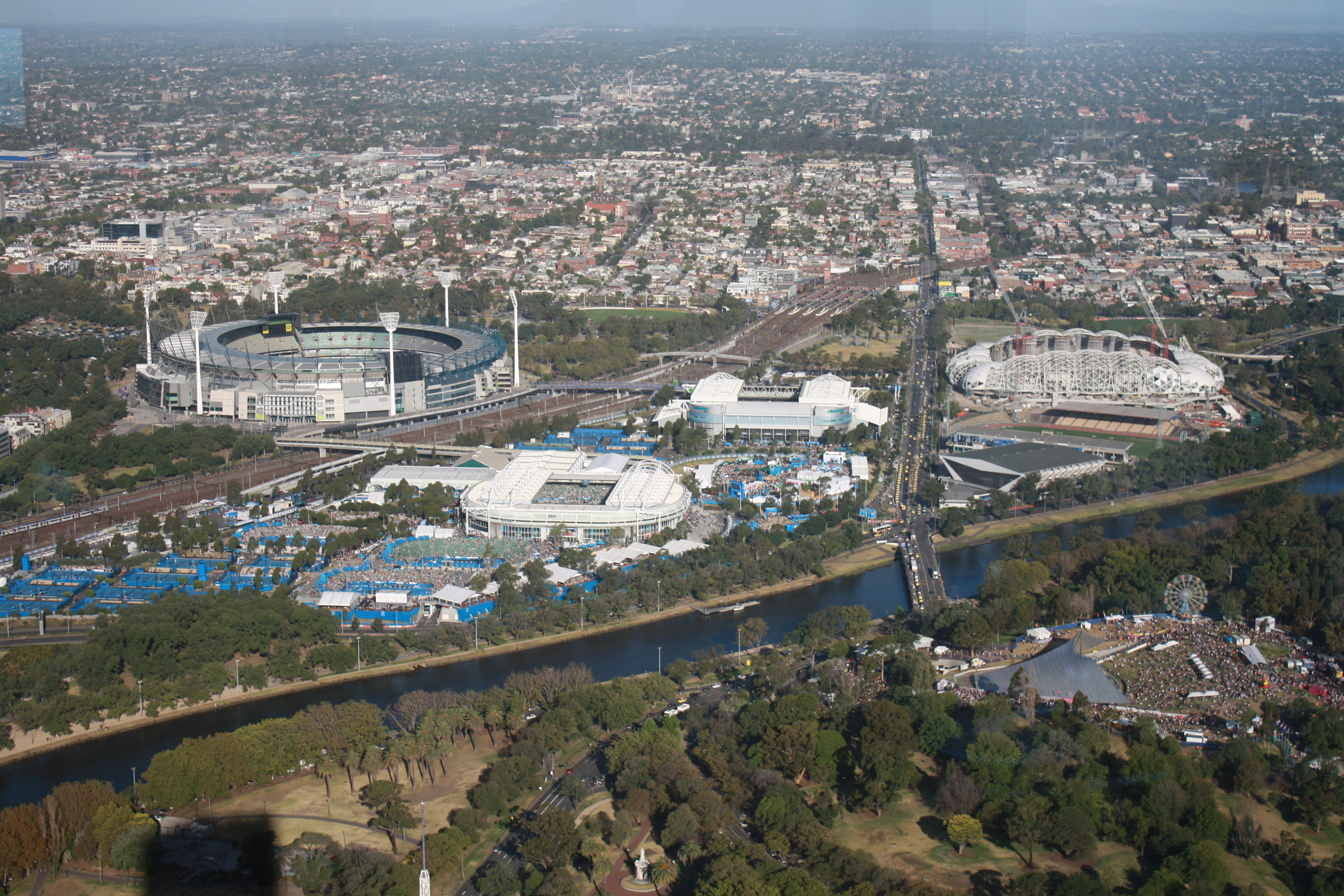
The Melbourne Sports and Entertainment Precinct with Melbourne Park being situated between Yarra Park and the MCG to the left and AAMI Park and Olympic Park to the right

Melbourne Park is owned by the Victorian Government and managed by the Melbourne & Olympic Parks Trust, which also runs the adjacent Melbourne Rectangular Stadium. The Yarra Park section of the Sports and Entertainment Precinct is run separately.

== History ==
The park was originally known as Flinders Park until 1996, when then-premier Jeff Kennett decided to change the name to Melbourne Park, mainly to advertise the name "Melbourne" to a wide international audience during events held there. The decision was met with opposition, and was compared by some to renaming Stade Roland Garros (home to the French Open in Paris) "Paris Park". However, over the years, the name has become accepted by Melburnians.

Melbourne Park was developed in 1988 beside the Jolimont Yard as a new precinct to host the Australian Open. The previous venue, Kooyong Lawn Tennis Club, had become too small for the burgeoning tournament. Construction of the park was completed in 1988 at a cost of at least $94 million. The unveiling of the new precinct was met with incredibly positive reviews by players and spectators, with some labelling the facilities and amenities the best of the four Grand Slams. Another expansion of the precinct occurred in 1996, when a further $23 million was invested to create two fully seated and larger show courts and eight new courts, as well as a large grassy space, now known as Grand Slam Oval.

The organisation responsible for managing the precinct is the Melbourne and Olympic Parks Trust, which was established in October 1995 in accordance with the provisions of the amended Melbourne and Olympic Parks Act 1985 (No. 10206). In April 2018, Tennis Australia revealed it harboured ambitions to take over management rights of the entire precinct, with the hope of maximising its use for other sporting and cultural events outside of the Australian Open.

== Events ==
While it is best known for being a tennis venue, Melbourne Park also plays host to a number of other sports and musical events throughout the year. The venue tends to be used by more popular international performers, as it is the largest the city has to offer, excluding the Docklands Stadium in the Docklands and the nearby Melbourne Cricket Ground. All three stadium courts/arenas are multi-purpose, being used for a variety of events, including the Australian Open commitments in January, but the Rod Laver Arena and Margaret Court Arena venues are most commonly used for music concerts.

Aside from the tennis tournament, which typically attracts crowds in excess of 800,000, the park has facilities that allows other sports to be played regularly at Melbourne Park's arenas, such as netball (Super Netball teams, Melbourne Vixens and Collingwood Magpies play home matches at John Cain Arena and Margaret Court Arena) and basketball (National Basketball League team Melbourne United play home matches at John Cain Arena). In the past Melbourne Park has hosted ice skating, track cycling, international swimming and motorsport events.

The Australian Open presented pickleball for the first time at the 2025 Australian Open. From January 24 to the 26th the AO Pickleball Slam tournament was held on Court 3. One hundred thousand dollars in prize money was awarded to some of Australia's top professional pickleball players.

== Arenas and facilities ==
Melbourne Park is the only Grand Slam tennis venue to have three courts installed with a retractable roof, allowing play to continue in the event of rain or extreme heat. The courts were Plexicushion from 2008 to 2019.

Court	Picture	Opened	Capacity	Arena Roof	Ref.
Rod Laver Arena		1988	14,820	Retractable	
John Cain Arena		2000	10,300	Retractable	
Margaret Court Arena (Formerly Show Court 1)		1988	7,500	Retractable	
Show Court Arena (Kia Arena)		2021	5,000	No	
Show Court 2 (1573 Arena)		1988	3,000	No	
Court 3 (ANZ Arena)		1988	3,000	No	

=== Rod Laver Arena ===
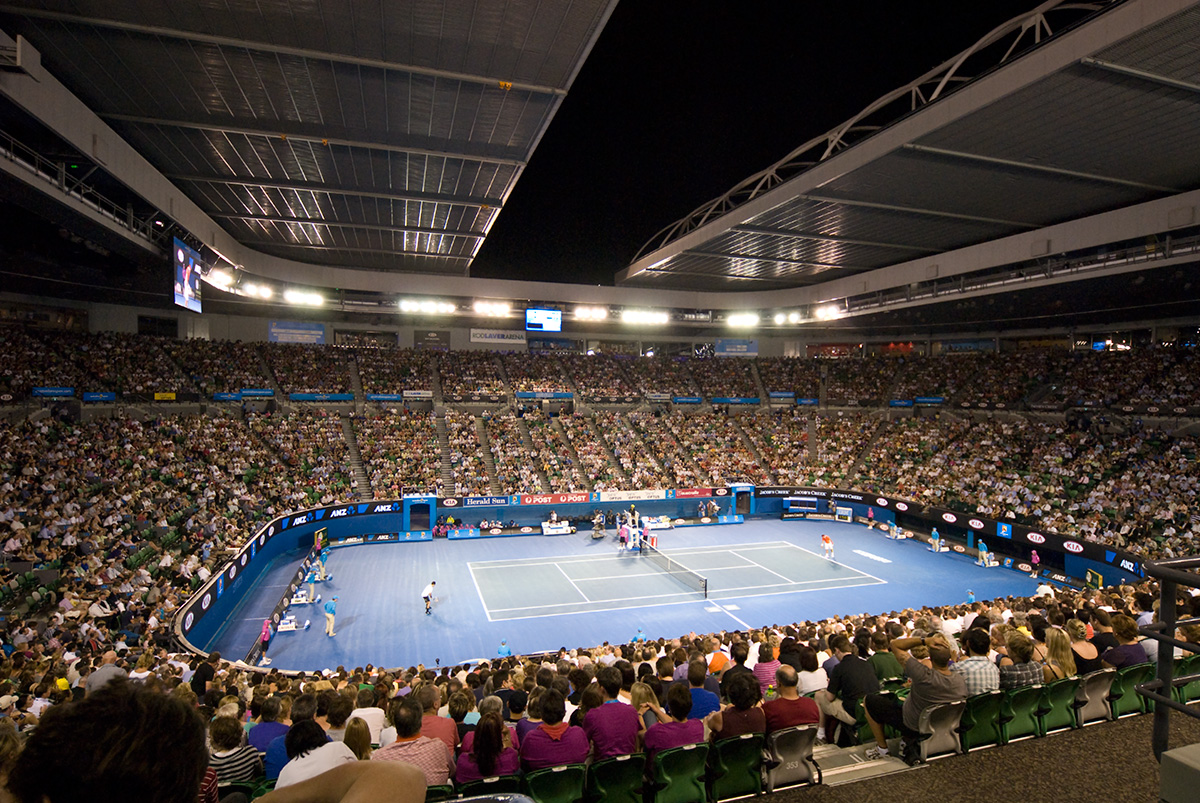
Rod Laver Arena

Formerly known as Centre Court, Rod Laver Arena has a capacity of nearly 15,000 and has a retractable roof. The arena was opened in 1988 prior to that year's championships and was originally known as the National Tennis Centre at Flinders Park. It was not until January 2000 that the arena was named after one of the greatest Australian tennis players, Rod Laver.

Rod Laver Arena has played host to some of the most memorable tennis matches, such as:

- Rafael Nadal vs. Roger Federer (2009 & 2017 finals) – The Federer-Nadal rivalry includes two finals at the Australian Open, each eight years apart and shared equally between the pair. Both went to five sets and are considered classics. The 2009 final was particularly noteworthy for Federer's tears during the post-match presentation.
- Novak Djokovic vs. Rafael Nadal (2012 final) – Considered one of the greatest matches ever, Djokovic clinched his third Australian Open title in a near-six hour epic, defeating Nadal 7–5 in the fifth set. It was the longest final in Grand Slam history, lasting 5 hours 53 minutes and eclipsing the previous record set by Mats Wilander and Ivan Lendl at the 1988 US Open final.
- Lleyton Hewitt vs. Roger Federer (2003 Davis Cup semi-final) – Labelled "one of the greatest comebacks in Australia's long Davis Cup history," Hewitt defeated a still rising Federer, 5–7 2–6 7–6 (7–4) 7–5 6–1 before a raucous Melbourne crowd and booked Australia's place in the final.

=== John Cain Arena ===
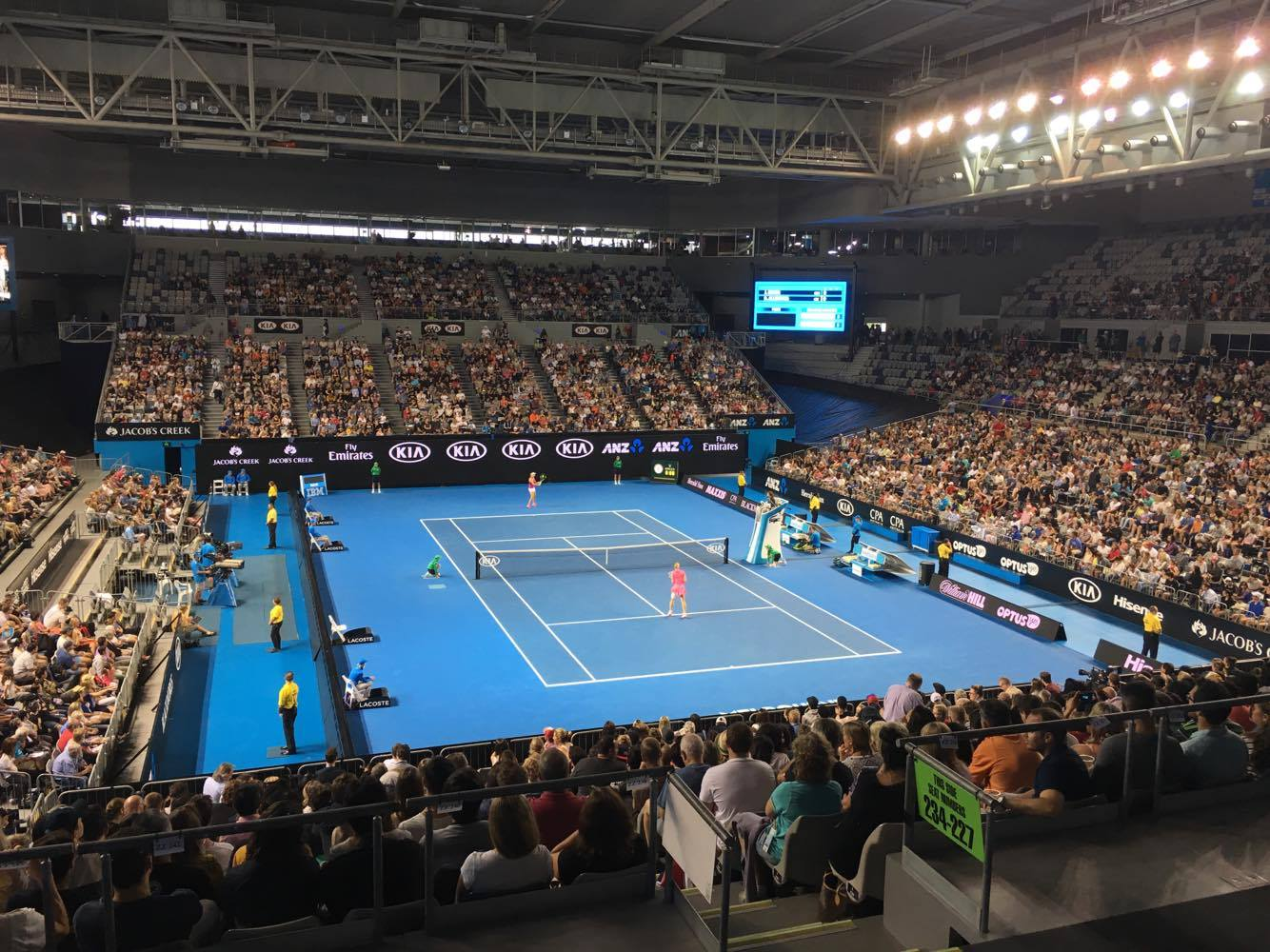
John Cain Arena

The second largest court is John Cain Arena (originally known as the Multi-Purpose Venue, as it was referred to during the 2006 Commonwealth Games, Vodafone Arena, Hisense Arena and Melbourne Arena) which was opened in 2000. It has a capacity of 10,500, and also has a retractable roof. Completed in 2000 for a cost of $65 million, the arena has hosted a wide variety of sporting and other events since its inception including boxing bouts such as Anthony Mundine vs. Lester Ellis, as well as Grand Finals in netball and basketball and concerts performed by Scissor Sisters, B. B. King, Nicki Minaj and One Direction.

During the Australian Open, John Cain Arena hosts numerous day and night matches up to the end of the fourth round. Most notably it is the venue of the longest women's singles match in a Grand Slam. Francesca Schiavone defeated Svetlana Kuznetsova 6–4 1–6 16–14 in four hours and forty-four minutes at the fourth round of the 2011 Australian Open.

=== Margaret Court Arena ===
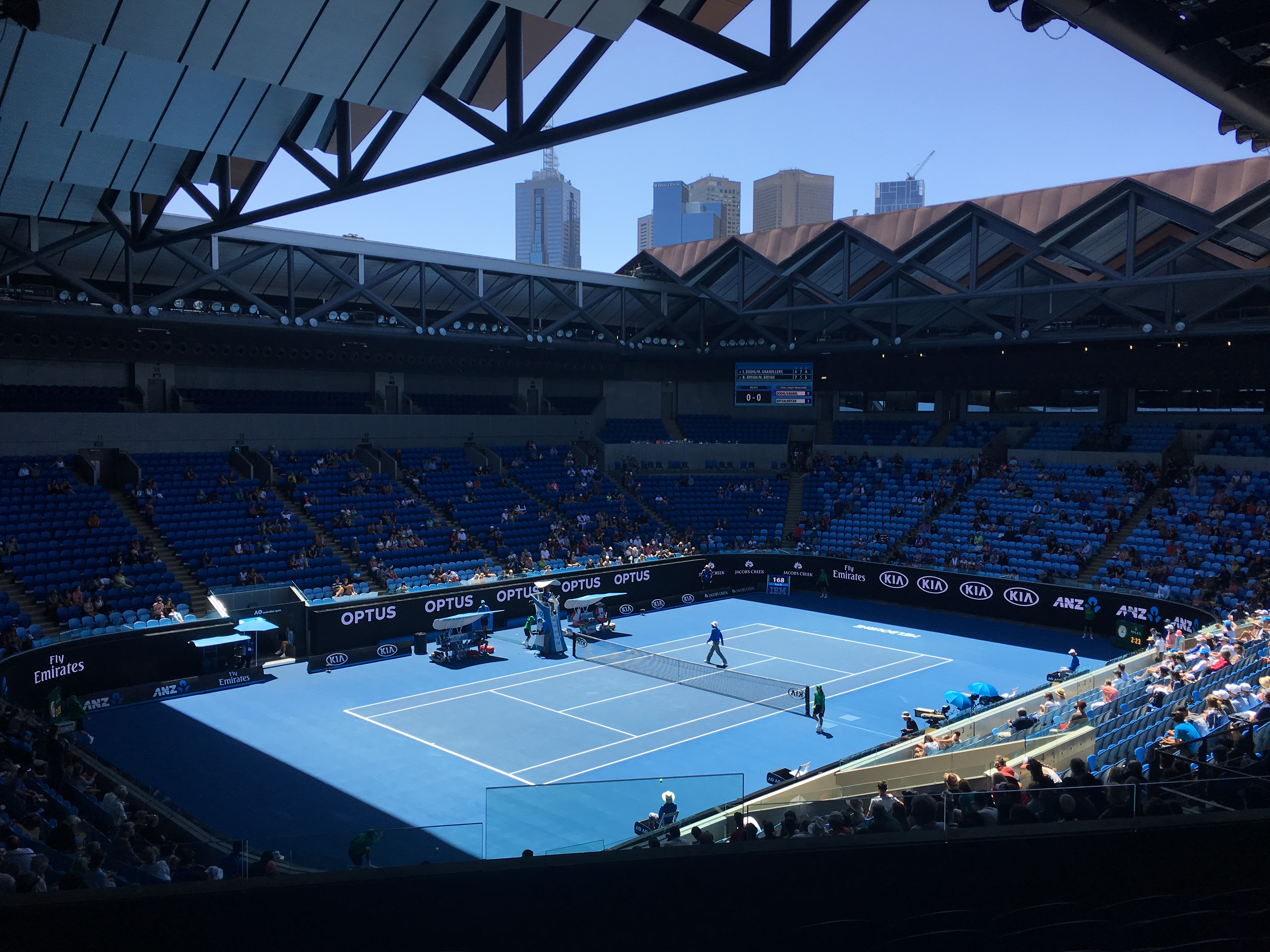
Margaret Court Arena

Formerly known as Show Court 1, Margaret Court Arena was opened in 1988 along with the Melbourne Park precinct. Originally seating 6,000 spectators, the arena underwent a renovation which increased the capacity to 7,500 and added a retractable roof – the fastest of its kind in the world, opening or closing in just five minutes. The redevelopment was completed prior to the 2015 Australian Open. The arena is also used for regular music concerts and is one of the two home courts of Super Netball team the Melbourne Vixens.

Conjecture over the name of the arena has caused significant debate in Australian society. Named in honour of Margaret Court, statistically Australia's greatest Grand Slam singles player, Court has sparked controversy over her public views on LGBT issues. As recently as 2017 there were calls from several public figures for the arena's name to be changed. Venue management has previously stated that it does not support Court's comments and "embrace[s] equality, diversity and inclusion".

=== Show Court Arena ===
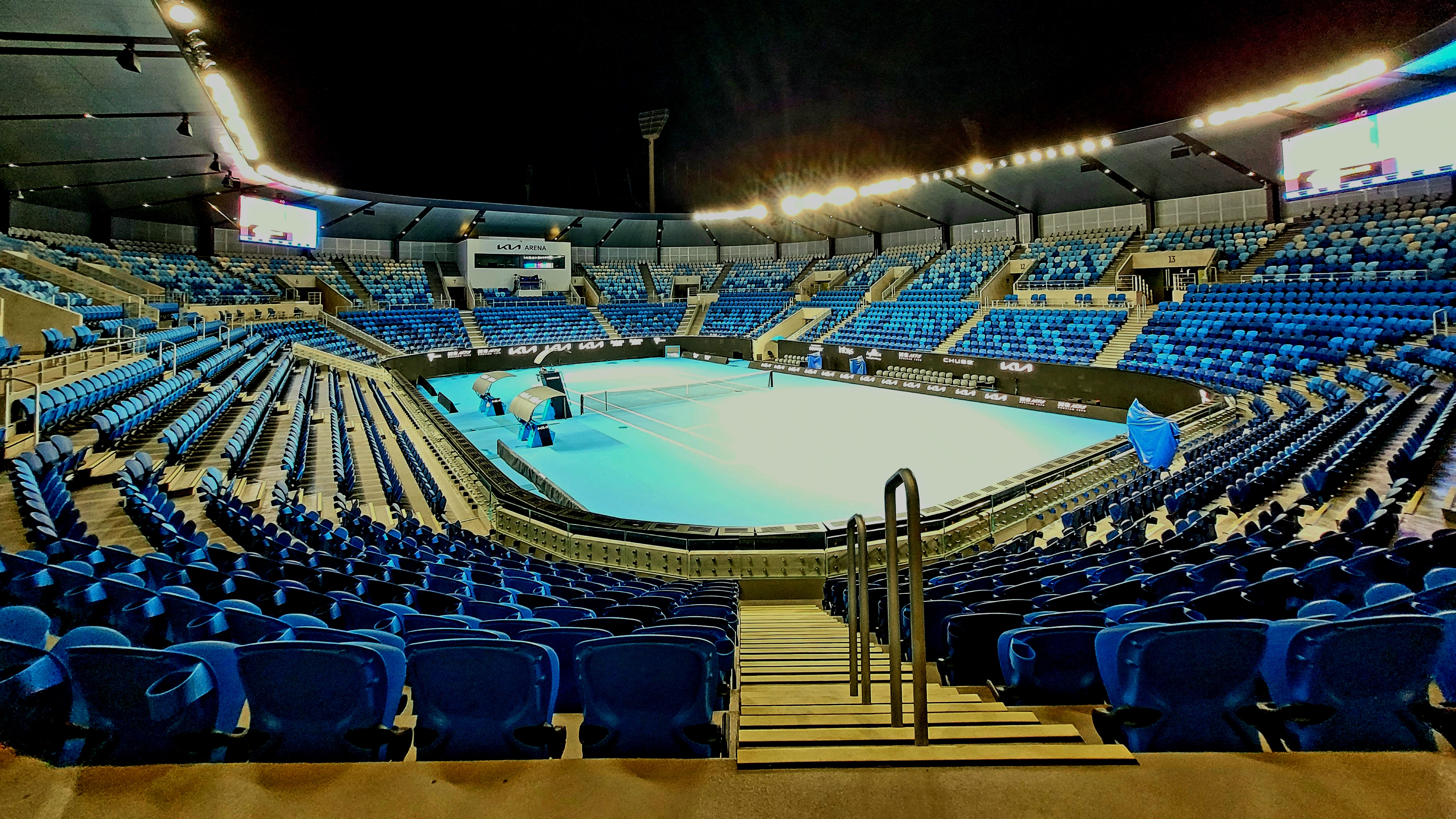
Show Court Arena in January 2022

In April 2019 construction of the Show Court Arena (known commercially as Kia Arena) commenced on the site of the old Eastern Courts 16–23, between Rod Laver and John Cain Arenas. The open-air arena is partially sunken into the ground and has a roof structure capable of protecting most of the spectators from the extremities, however unlike the larger arenas it does not have a retractable roof capable of being shut during inclement weather. Construction of the arena was the signature element of the $271.5 million third stage of redevelopments of Melbourne Park and was completed prior to the 2022 Australian Open. The arena seats 5,000 spectators.

=== Show Courts ===
Aside from a further 35 match day and practice courts, many of which have temporary standing of up to 2,500 capacity attached to them for the Australian Open, there are two Show Courts at Melbourne Park, Show Court 2 (known for commercial purposes as 1573 Arena) and Court 3 (known for commercial purposes as ANZ Arena), each with a permanent seating capacity of approximately 3,000.

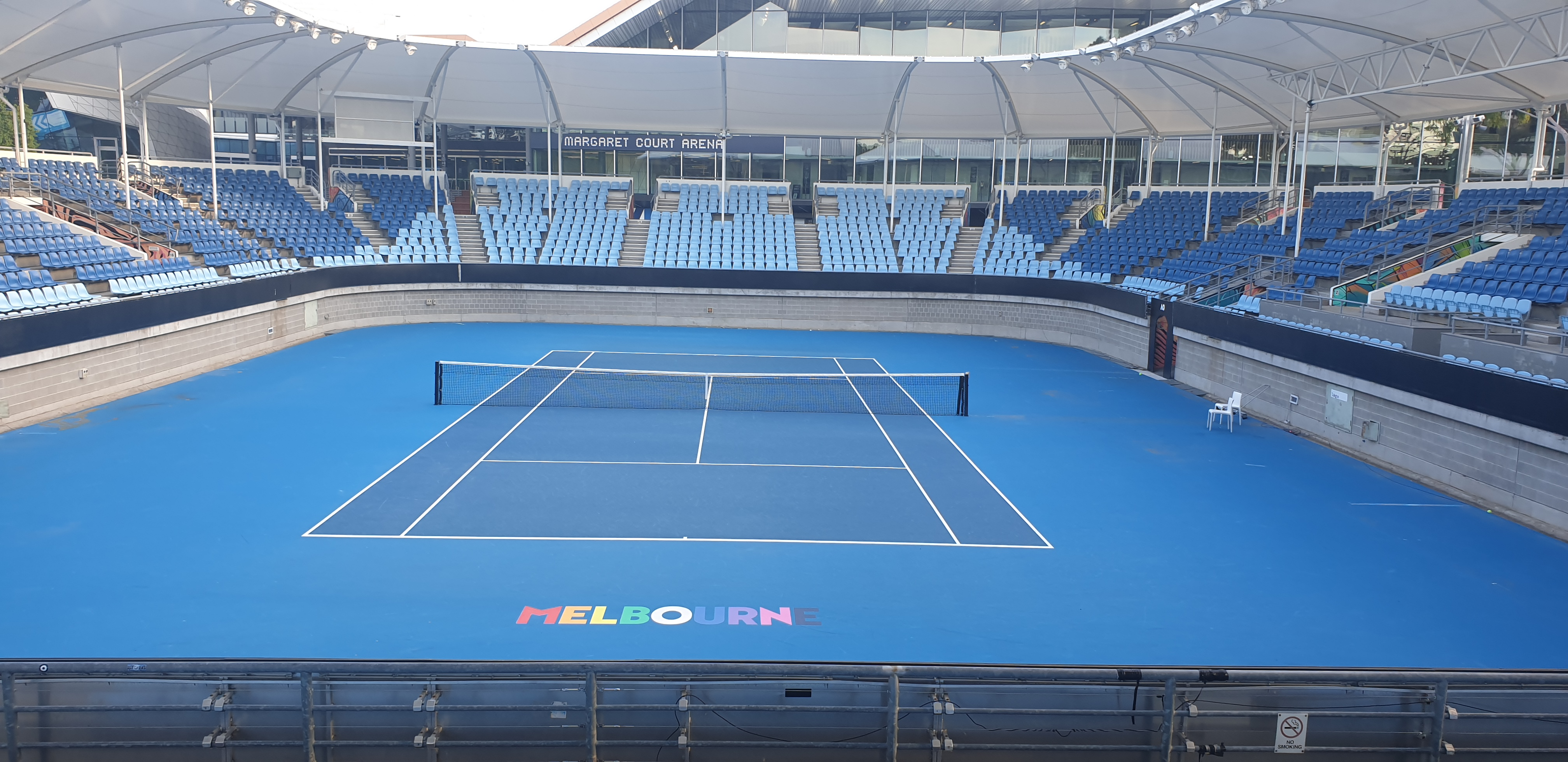
View of Show Court 3 in March 2021

Like all the other tennis courts at Melbourne Park, these show courts remain as tennis courts throughout the year and are available for use by the general public. The remaining courts at Melbourne Park are outdoor courts located mostly on the western side of the precinct closer to Birrarung Marr. They have seating of anywhere from 50 to 2,500 installed for the Australian Open.

=== Centrepiece ===
Opened in September 2021, Centrepiece replaced the old function and media centre, is located near Garden Square and Rod Laver Arena. The building is capable of hosting large events and banquets of varying capacity inside the grand ballroom, and is also equipped with media and television broadcast facilities, studios and meeting rooms, and a 250-seat auditorium.

== Redevelopment (2010–2022) ==
A view of Melbourne Park from the Melbourne Cricket Ground

The Melbourne Park Redevelopment was the process by which the precinct underwent three significant stages of redevelopment between 2010 and 2022. The Stage 1 redevelopment included the construction of a new Eastern Plaza to host an elite tennis training facility and a new bridge linking Melbourne Park to the nearby AAMI Park stadium and Olympic Park Oval, as well as an upgrade to Margaret Court Arena. The Eastern Plaza Tennis Training Facility, which was later renamed the National Tennis Centre, features eight indoor and 13 outdoor courts, eight of which are European-style clay courts. It was unveiled in January 2013. Margaret Court Arena had its seating capacity expanded to 7,500 and a retractable roof installed, and was opened ahead of the 2015 Australian Open. The cost of the Stage 1 redevelopment was $366 million.

Stage 2 of the redevelopment began in June 2015, when it was announced that Rod Laver Arena would undergo a redevelopment of its exterior facade and interior features, such as bars and other player and spectator facilities. The broader second stage upgrade included a new footbridge linking Melbourne Park and Birrarung Marr and an Administration and Media Building, to house Tennis Australia and Melbourne & Olympic Parks Trust headquarters. The new footbridge, named Tanderrum Bridge, was unveiled in December 2016 and the Administration and Media Building was completed two months earlier. The Rod Laver Arena refurbishment included a new four-level training, leisure and multi-dining facility for athletes at the Australian Open and the general public at other times; this was completed in December 2018. Rod Laver Arena's retractable roof was also upgraded to allow for it to be closed for inclement weather in five minutes, dropping from the 30 minutes it took to close beforehand. The Stage 2 redevelopment cost $338 million and was fully completed in September 2019.

The final phase of redevelopment (Stage 3) was announced in April 2017 by the Victorian Government; a further $271.3 million was invested to complete upgrades for Melbourne Park. Construction of Stage 3 began in April 2019. The signature elements of this phase of redevelopment was the construction of a new 5,000-seat sunken show court arena located between Rod Laver and John Cain arenas, and the construction of a double-storey function and media centre named Centrepiece, on the site of the old function centre. The Centrepiece building features a Grand Hall capable of seating up to 1400 people at a banquet, a press conference-style auditorium for up to 250 people and several broadcast studios capable of being converted into meeting rooms, boardrooms or cocktail events. Other upgrades to the park as part of this stage was the installation of a central logistics hub which included a kitchen and loading dock, additional grassed public spaces, and two match tennis courts with seating for several hundred spectators. Construction of the Centrepiece facility was completed in August 2021. Overall, a total of $972 million was spent on the multi-year redevelopment of the Melbourne Park precinct. Completion of all works at the precinct was achieved in December 2021, shortly prior to the 2022 Australian Open in January.

== Transport and access ==
Melbourne Park is adjacent to the Melbourne Cricket Ground in Yarra Park, and there are several pedestrian bridges linking the two across the separating railway lines. The park is five minutes walk from Richmond and Jolimont railway stations, and five minutes from the city centre by tram (route 70) or ten minutes on foot.

== See also ==
- Australian Open
- Melbourne Sports and Entertainment Precinct
- List of tennis stadiums by capacity
