= 2009 Australian Open =

- Date: 19 January – 1 February 2009
- Edition: 97th
- Category: Grand Slam (ITF)
- Surface: Hardcourt (Plexicushion)
- Location: Melbourne, Australia
- Venue: Melbourne Park

Champions

Men's singles
- (Spain) Rafael Nadal

Women's singles
- (United States) Serena Williams

Men's doubles
- (United States) Bob Bryan / (United States) Mike Bryan

Women's doubles
- (United States) Serena Williams / (United States) Venus Williams

Mixed doubles
- (India) Sania Mirza / (India) Mahesh Bhupathi

Wheelchair men's singles
- (Japan) Shingo Kunieda

Wheelchair women's singles
- (Netherlands) Esther Vergeer

Wheelchair quad singles
- (United Kingdom) Peter Norfolk

Wheelchair men's doubles
- (Netherlands) Robin Ammerlaan / (Japan) Shingo Kunieda

Wheelchair women's doubles
- (Netherlands) Korie Homan / (Netherlands) Esther Vergeer

Wheelchair quad doubles
- (United States) Nick Taylor / (United States) David Wagner

Boys' singles
- (India) Yuki Bhambri

Girls' singles
- (Russia) Ksenia Pervak

Boys' doubles
- (Philippines) Francis Casey Alcantara / (Chinese Taipei) Hsieh Cheng-peng

Girls' doubles
- (United States) Christina McHale / (Croatia) Ajla Tomljanović
- Australian Open

The 2009 Australian Open was a tennis tournament played on outdoor hard courts. It was the 97th edition of the Australian Open, and the first Grand Slam event of the year. It took place at the Melbourne Park in Melbourne, Australia, from 19 January through 1 February 2009. The tournament is remembered for containing many notable matches of the 2009 year, including the Nadal v Verdasco semi final and the Nadal v Federer final. It was the first hard court Grand Slam in which Nadal made the final or won.

Novak Djokovic and Maria Sharapova were the defending champions. Djokovic was forced to retire in his quarter-final match against Andy Roddick due to heat stress, ending his title defence, whilst Sharapova chose not to defend her title due to long lasting shoulder surgery; the withdrawal subsequently dropped her out of the WTA's Top 10 for the first time since July 2004.

Second seeded Serena Williams regained the women's singles title and recorded her fourth Australian Open title and tenth Grand Slam title overall after defeating third seed Dinara Safina in straight sets. Serena, partnering with her sister Venus, also won the women's doubles tournament.

First seeded Rafael Nadal defeated Roger Federer in five sets to win the men's singles title. This was Nadal's first hard court grand slam title, having previously only won on clay at Roland Garros four times and grass at Wimbledon once. He also became the first Spaniard to ever win the Australian Open. This tournament featured 23 five-set men's singles matches, the most since 1988. In men's doubles, another sibling pair took the title as Bob and Mike Bryan defeated Mahesh Bhupathi and Mark Knowles.

This tournament was notable for being the warmest tournament weather-wise; the average daily maximum temperature throughout the tournament was 34.7 degrees Celsius, nine degrees above normal. The coolest Australian Open was in 1986, when the maximum temperature averaged just 22.5 degrees Celsius, 3.5 degrees below normal.

== Day-by-day summaries ==
=== Day 1 (19 January) ===
Day one's play began with 7th seeded Andy Roddick easing through to the 2nd round in Rod Laver Arena in straight sets. Later defending champion and 3rd seeded Novak Djokovic also made it to the second round, as well as seeded players Juan Martín del Potro, Marat Safin, Tomáš Berdych, Mardy Fish, Philipp Kohlschreiber, Robin Söderling, Paul-Henri Mathieu, Tommy Robredo, Stanislas Wawrinka, Marin Čilić, while 11th seeded David Ferrer was made to work hard before prevailing in five sets over Denis Gremelmayr. 2006 finalist Marcos Baghdatis also progressed in straight sets, while Australia's defending boy's champion Bernard Tomic won a four set encounter on his debut. Later in the evening, 10th seeded David Nalbandian dropped a set but eventually defeated Frenchman Marc Gicquel, while three-time champion 2nd seed Roger Federer won the first set easily, but was made to work hard in the next two sets, before defeating Italian Andreas Seppi on his fifth match point. 27th seed Feliciano López was the only seed to fall, losing to 2008 US Open quarterfinalist, Luxembourg's Gilles Müller in a five set thriller that ended 16–14 in the fifth. The match was originally thought to be the longest in the history of the Australian Open, spanning over 5 hours and 34 minutes. However, it was later discovered that a timing error had added over an hour to the match, that in reality lasted 4 hours and 24 minutes. The semifinal match between Rafael Nadal and Fernando Verdasco did become the longest, however, at 5 hours and 14 minutes.

In the women's singles, last year's finalist and 5th seeded Ana Ivanovic began her campaign with a hard earned straight sets victory, while compatriot and top seed Jelena Janković was an easy winner over Yvonne Meusburger. Other players following the Serbian duo into the second round include 3rd seed Dinara Safina, 7th seed Vera Zvonareva, Caroline Wozniacki, Alizé Cornet, Nadia Petrova, Marion Bartoli, Anna Chakvetadze, Alisa Kleybanova and Ai Sugiyama. 25th seeded Estonian Kaia Kanepi halted the progress of former world number four Kimiko Date-Krumm, playing in the main draw of a Grand Slam for the first time in 13 years, in three tight sets, while last year's semifinalist Daniela Hantuchová defeated local hope Casey Dellacqua in straight sets. Another former world number four, unseeded Australian Jelena Dokić also moved into the second round for the first time in ten years with a hard-fought victory over Tamira Paszek. Meanwhile, 23rd seed Ágnes Szávay's poor form in Grand Slams continued as she crashed out to Galina Voskoboeva, 24th seed Sybille Bammer lost to Lucie Šafářová, while Sara Errani defeated 27th seed Maria Kirilenko.

- Seeds out:
  - Men's Singles: (Spain) Feliciano López
  - Women's Singles: (Hungary) Ágnes Szávay, (Austria) Sybille Bammer, (Russia) Maria Kirilenko
- Schedule of Play

Matches on main courts
Matches on Rod Laver Arena
Event	Winner	Loser	Score
Men's singles – 1st round	(United States) Andy Roddick [7]	(Sweden) Björn Rehnquist	6–0, 6–2, 6–2
Women's singles – 1st round	(Serbia) Jelena Janković [1]	(Austria) Yvonne Meusburger	6–1, 6–3
Men's singles – 1st round	(Serbia) Novak Djokovic [3]	(Italy) Andrea Stoppini	6–2, 6–3, 7–5
Women's singles – 1st round	(Slovakia) Daniela Hantuchová [19]	(Australia) Casey Dellacqua	7–6(11), 6–4
Men's singles – 1st round	(Switzerland) Roger Federer [2]	(Italy) Andreas Seppi	6–1, 7–6^{(7–4)}, 7–5
Matches on Hisense Arena
Event	Winner	Loser	Score
Women's singles – 1st round	(Serbia) Ana Ivanovic [5]	(Germany) Julia Görges	7–5, 6–3
Men's singles – 1st round	(Argentina) Juan Martín del Potro [8]	(Germany) Mischa Zverev	6–3, 6–4, 6–2
Women's singles – 1st round	(Australia) Jelena Dokić	(Austria) Tamira Paszek	6–2, 3–6, 6–4
Men's singles – 1st round	(Russia) Marat Safin [26]	(Spain) Iván Navarro	6–3, 6–3, 6–4
Matches on Margaret Court Arena
Event	Winner	Loser	Score
Women's singles – 1st round	(Russia) Vera Zvonareva [7]	(Slovakia) Magdaléna Rybáriková	7–6^{(7–2)}, 6–0
Men's singles – 1st round	(Australia) Bernard Tomic	(Italy) Potito Starace	7–6(5), 1–6, 7–6^{(7–5)}, 7–6^{(8–6)}
Women's singles – 1st round	(Denmark) Caroline Wozniacki [11]	(Israel) Shahar Pe'er	6–3, 6–2
Women's singles – 1st round	(Russia) Dinara Safina [3]	(Russia) Alla Kudryavtseva	6–3, 6–4
Men's singles – 1st round	(Argentina) David Nalbandian [10]	(France) Marc Gicquel	6–1, 4–6, 6–2, 6–3
Colored background means night matches

=== Day 2 (20 January) ===
With temperatures soaring in Melbourne, Andy Murray had life made easy in his first round match when opponent Andrei Pavel was forced to concede with a back injury early in the second set, having lost the first. Other top-ten seeds such as last year's finalist Jo-Wilfried Tsonga, Gilles Simon and James Blake also progressed comfortably, along with Gaël Monfils, Fernando Verdasco, Richard Gasquet, Jürgen Melzer, Ivo Karlović and Radek Štěpánek, while Igor Andreev and Nicolás Almagro both won through in five sets. In a five-set thriller that lasted three hours and seven minutes, former finalist and 13th seed Fernando González overcame home-crowd favorite Lleyton Hewitt. Later on, top-seed Rafael Nadal posted a 6–0, 6–2, 6–2 win against Christophe Rochus that tied with Andy Roddick's first-round score, establishing himself and Roddick as the most dominant male performers of the first round. Two more seeds fell in the first round, with Russian 29th seed Dmitry Tursunov losing to Flavio Cipolla, while another former finalist, 30th seed Rainer Schüttler was defeated by Israel's Dudi Sela.

In the women's draw, Polish 9th seed Agnieszka Radwańska became the first top ten seed on either side to lose, as she was upset in three sets by Kateryna Bondarenko. 4th seed Elena Dementieva, on a ten-match winning streak this season, pulled through in three tough sets while the Williams sisters, 6th seeded Venus and second seed Serena, comfortably won their first-round matches, as did former women's champion Amélie Mauresmo, along with Svetlana Kuznetsova, Anabel Medina Garrigues, Patty Schnyder, Flavia Pennetta, Alona Bondarenko and Zheng Jie, while teenagers Victoria Azarenka and Dominika Cibulková recorded crushing victories over their respective opponents. 30th seeded Canadian Aleksandra Wozniak suffered defeat at the hands of Sabine Lisicki, while Francesca Schiavone lost to Peng Shuai and Tamarine Tanasugarn was defeated by María José Martínez Sánchez.

- Seeds out:
  - Men's Singles: (Russia) Dmitry Tursunov, (Germany) Rainer Schüttler
  - Women's Singles: (Poland) Agnieszka Radwańska, (Italy) Francesca Schiavone, (Canada) Aleksandra Wozniak, (Thailand) Tamarine Tanasugarn
- Schedule of Play

Matches on main courts
Matches on Rod Laver Arena
Event	Winner	Loser	Score
Men's singles – 1st round	(United Kingdom) Andy Murray [4]	(Romania) Andrei Pavel	6–2, 3–1, RET
Women's singles – 1st round	(United States) Serena Williams [2]	(China) Meng Yuan	6–3, 6–2
Men's singles – 1st round	(Chile) Fernando González [13]	(Australia) Lleyton Hewitt	5–7, 6–2, 6–2, 3–6, 6–3
Women's singles – 1st round	(Australia) Samantha Stosur	(Czech Republic) Klára Zakopalová	7–6(5), 7–6(0)
Men's singles – 1st round	(Spain) Rafael Nadal [1]	(Belgium) Christophe Rochus	6–0, 6–2, 6–2
Matches on Hisense Arena
Event	Winner	Loser	Score
Women's singles – 1st round	(Russia) Elena Dementieva [4]	(Germany) Kristina Barrois	7–6^{(7–4)}, 2–6, 6–1
Men's singles – 1st round	(France) Gilles Simon [6]	(Spain) Pablo Andújar	6–4, 6–1, 6–1
Women's singles – 1st round	(United States) Venus Williams [3]	(Germany) Angelique Kerber	6–3, 6–3
Men's singles – 1st round	(France) Jo-Wilfried Tsonga [5]	(Argentina) Juan Mónaco	6–4, 6–4, 6–0
Matches on Margaret Court Arena
Event	Winner	Loser	Score
Women's singles – 1st round	(France) Virginie Razzano	(Australia) Jarmila Gajdošová	6–1, 6–7^{(2–7)}, 6–4
Men's singles – 1st round	(Australia) Chris Guccione	(France) Nicolas Devilder	6–4, 6–2, 6–4
Women's singles – 1st round	(Spain) Anabel Medina Garrigues [21]	(Australia) Isabella Holland	6–1, 7–5
Women's singles – 1st round	(Russia) Svetlana Kuznetsova [8]	(Australia) Anastasia Rodionova	6–2, 3–6, 6–3
Men's singles – 1st round	(United States) James Blake [9]	(Canada) Frank Dancevic	6–4, 6–3, 7–5
Colored background means night matches

=== Day 3 (21 January) ===
Day three saw the second round matches getting underway in Melbourne Park. Defending champion and 3rd seed Novak Djokovic progressed with a straight sets victory over Jérémy Chardy, while second seed Roger Federer breezed past 118th-ranked Russian Evgeny Korolev 6–2, 6–3, 6–1 at Rod Laver Arena, which sets up a third-round match with Marat Safin, who recovered from a slow start to beat Guillermo García López 7–5, 6–2, 6–2. Andy Roddick also needed four sets to get past Xavier Malisse, while Juan Martín del Potro eased into the third round, along with Marin Čilić, David Ferrer, Stanislas Wawrinka, Mardy Fish, Tomáš Berdych and Tommy Robredo. In the biggest upset in the men's tournament up to this point, unseeded Yen-hsun Lu defeated 10th-seeded David Nalbandian in five sets. 16th-seeded Robin Söderling was also upset by unseeded former finalist Marcos Baghdatis in four, while lucky loser Amer Delić prevailed in five sets against 28th seed Paul-Henri Mathieu and French veteran Fabrice Santoro came from behind to defeat Philipp Kohlschreiber. In the feature night match at Rod Laver Arena, sixteen-year-old Bernard Tomic took the first set against Gilles Müller but eventually lost 3–6, 6–1, 6–4, 6–2 to the more experienced Luxembourger.

In the women's draw, it was a perfect day for the seeds, with the exception of 17th-seeded Anna Chakvetadze, who lost a sensational 3-set encounter to Jelena Dokić, the latter continuing with her comeback and set up a third round clash with Danish teenager, 11th seed Caroline Wozniacki after some questionable decisions by Fred Mather. Top seed Jelena Janković encountered resistance against Kirsten Flipkens but eventually won 6–4, 7–5, while Ana Ivanovic had an easier time against qualifier Alberta Brianti. Third seed Dinara Safina also needed to come back from one set down to beat Ekaterina Makarova, while Vera Zvonareva crushed Edina Gallovits 6–0, 6–0, and Nadia Petrova defeat Sania Mirza in straight sets. Also through to the third round are Alizé Cornet, Daniela Hantuchová, Marion Bartoli, Ai Sugiyama, Kaia Kanepi and Alisa Kleybanova.

- Seeds out:
  - Men's Singles: (Argentina) David Nalbandian, (Sweden) Robin Söderling, (France) Paul-Henri Mathieu, (Germany) Philipp Kohlschreiber
  - Women's Singles: (Russia) Anna Chakvetadze

The doubles matches also began, with most of the seeds in action passing their first tests, including Bob and Mike Bryan, Jeff Coetzee/Wesley Moodie, Mariusz Fyrstenberg/Marcin Matkowski, Bruno Soares/Kevin Ullyett, Max Mirnyi/Andy Ram, Travis Parrott/Filip Polášek, František Čermák/Michal Mertiňák and Christopher Kas/Rogier Wassen, as well as Yan Zi/Zheng Jie, Samantha Stosur/Rennae Stubbs, Maria Kirilenko/Flavia Pennetta, Casey Dellacqua/Francesca Schiavone, Hsieh Su-wei/Peng Shuai and Tatiana Poutchek/Anastasia Rodionova in the women's side. In the three sister pairings in action, 10th seeds Venus and Serena Williams swept aside Svetlana Kuznetsova and Nadia Petrova, unseeded Agnieszka and Urszula Radwańska defeat Jill Craybas and Tamarine Tanasugarn, but 4th seeds and defending champions Alona and Kateryna Bondarenko became the highest seeds to fall in the women doubles competition so far, losing in straight sets to Gisela Dulko/Roberta Vinci.

  - Men's Doubles: (France) Arnaud Clément / (France) Marc Gicquel
  - Women's Doubles: (Ukraine) Alona Bondarenko / (Ukraine) Kateryna Bondarenko, (China) Sun Tiantian / (Chinese Taipei) Chuang Chia-jung
- Schedule of Play

Matches on main courts
Matches on Rod Laver Arena
Event	Winner	Loser	Score
Women's singles – 2nd round	(Serbia) Ana Ivanovic [5]	(Italy) Alberta Brianti	6–3, 6–2
Men's singles – 2nd round	(Serbia) Novak Djokovic [3]	(France) Jérémy Chardy	7–5, 6–1, 6–3
Men's singles – 2nd round	(Switzerland) Roger Federer [2]	(Russia) Evgeny Korolev	6–2, 6–3, 6–1
Women's singles – 2nd round	(Australia) Jelena Dokić	(Russia) Anna Chakvetadze [17]	6–4, 6–7^{(4–7)}, 6–3
Men's singles – 2nd round	(Luxembourg) Gilles Müller	(Australia) Bernard Tomic	3–6, 6–1, 6–4, 6–2
Matches on Hisense Arena
Event	Winner	Loser	Score
Women's singles – 2nd round	(Russia) Dinara Safina [3]	(Russia) Ekaterina Makarova	6–7^{(3–7)}, 6–3, 6–0
Women's singles – 2nd round	(Serbia) Jelena Janković [1]	(Belgium) Kirsten Flipkens	6–4, 7–5
Men's singles – 2nd round	(Chinese Taipei) Yen-Hsun Lu	(Argentina) David Nalbandian [10]	6–4, 5–7, 4–6, 6–4, 6–2
Men's singles – 2nd round	(United States) Andy Roddick [7]	(Belgium) Xavier Malisse	4–6, 6–2, 7–6^{(7–1)}, 6–2
Matches on Margaret Court Arena
Event	Winner	Loser	Score
Women's singles – 2nd round	(Russia) Nadia Petrova [10]	(India) Sania Mirza	6–3, 6–2
Men's singles – 2nd round	(Russia) Marat Safin [26]	(Spain) Guillermo García López	7–5, 6–2, 6–2
Women's singles – 2nd round	(Russia) Vera Zvonareva [7]	(Romania) Edina Gallovits	6–0, 6–0
Women's singles – 2nd round	(Denmark) Caroline Wozniacki [11]	(Spain) Virginia Ruano Pascual	6–3, 6–3
Men's singles – 1st round	(Argentina) Juan Martín del Potro [8]	(Germany) Florian Mayer	6–1, 7–5, 6–2
Colored background means night matches

=== Day 4 (22 January) ===
Day four saw the conclusion of all second round matches in the singles competition. In the men's draw, top seed Rafael Nadal continued on his quest for a first Australian Open crown without too much trouble from Roko Karanušić, winning through in straight sets 6–2, 6–3, 6–2. Likewise, an in-form 4th seed Andy Murray eased into the 3rd round by defeating Marcel Granollers 6–4, 6–2, 6–2. Other top ten seeds that moved on included 5th seed Jo-Wilfried Tsonga and 6th seed Gilles Simon, both dropping a first set tiebreak but went on to win the next three sets, and 9th seed James Blake, who cruised past Sébastien de Chaunac. Gaël Monfils, Fernando González, Fernando Verdasco, Richard Gasquet, Nicolás Almagro, Radek Štěpánek, Jürgen Melzer and Igor Andreev all won through, while Ivo Karlović was the only seed to fall in the men's draw, losing to compatriot Mario Ančić after surrendering a two sets to one lead.

Unseeded Spaniard Carla Suárez Navarro scored the biggest upset to date in women's singles, defeating one of the pre-tournament favourites, 6th seeded Venus Williams 2–6, 6–3, 7–5, after coming back from 5–2 down and saving one match point while serving at 5–4 down in the third set. Venus' younger sister, second seeded Serena Williams had to work hard to dispatch Argentina's Gisela Dulko, saving six set points, while Dulko served for the second set at 5–3 in a game that featured 12 deuces, then fought through six more deuces to lead 6–5 and eventually won 6–3, 7–5. 4th seed Elena Dementieva extended her winning streak in the new season to 12 matches with a win over Iveta Benešová, and Svetlana Kuznetsova, Amélie Mauresmo, Victoria Azarenka, Dominika Cibulková, Zheng Jie, Flavia Pennetta, Anabel Medina Garrigues and Alona Bondarenko all moved on to the third round, while Swiss 14th seed Patty Schnyder fell to Virginie Razzano. Unseeded local hope Samantha Stosur also won.

- Seeds out:
  - Men's Singles: (Croatia) Ivo Karlović
  - Women's Singles: (United States) Venus Williams, (Switzerland) Patty Schnyder

Majority of the first round matches in the doubles competition also ended. Top seeds Daniel Nestor/Nenad Zimonjić led a charge of seeded pairs to the second round, including Mahesh Bhupathi/Mark Knowles, Leander Paes/Lukáš Dlouhý, Marcelo Melo/André Sá and Martin Damm/Robert Lindstedt, while in the women's competition co-world number ones Cara Black and Liezel Huber eased into the second round, along with seeds Anabel Medina Garrigues/Virginia Ruano Pascual, Květa Peschke/Lisa Raymond, Daniela Hantuchová/Ai Sugiyama, Victoria Azarenka/Vera Zvonareva, Nuria Llagostera Vives/María José Martínez Sánchez and Sorana Cîrstea/Monica Niculescu, meaning no seeds fell in the women's doubles that day.

  - Men's Doubles: (Sweden) Simon Aspelin / (Czech Republic) Pavel Vízner, (United States) Eric Butorac / (United Kingdom) Jamie Murray.
- Schedule of Play

Matches on main courts
Matches on Rod Laver Arena
Event	Winner	Loser	Score
Men's singles – 2nd round	(France) Gilles Simon [6]	(Australia) Chris Guccione	6–7^{(5–7)}, 6–4, 6–1, 6–2
Men's singles – 2nd round	(Spain) Rafael Nadal [1]	(Croatia) Roko Karanušić	6–2, 6–3, 6–2
Women's singles – 2nd round	(Australia) Samantha Stosur	(Germany) Sabine Lisicki	6–3, 6–4
Women's singles – 2nd round	(Spain) Carla Suárez Navarro	(United States) Venus Williams [6]	2–6, 6–3, 7–5
Men's singles – 2nd round	(United Kingdom) Andy Murray [4]	(Spain) Marcel Granollers	6–4, 6–2, 6–2
Matches on Hisense Arena
Event	Winner	Loser	Score
Women's singles – 2nd round	(Russia) Elena Dementieva [4]	(Czech Republic) Iveta Benešová	6–4, 6–1
Women's singles – 2nd round	(United States) Serena Williams [2]	(Argentina) Gisela Dulko	6–3, 7–5
Men's singles – 2nd round	(France) Gaël Monfils [12]	(Austria) Stefan Koubek	6–4, 6–4, 3–6, 6–2
Men's singles – 2nd round	(France) Jo-Wilfried Tsonga [5]	(Croatia) Ivan Ljubičić	6–7^{(4–7)}, 7–6^{(10–8)}, 7–6^{(9–7)}, 6–2
Matches on Margaret Court Arena
Event	Winner	Loser	Score
Men's singles – 2nd round	(Chile) Fernando González [13]	(Argentina) Guillermo Cañas	7–5, 6–3, 6–4
Women's singles – 2nd round	(Italy) Flavia Pennetta [12]	(Australia) Jessica Moore	6–4, 6–1
Women's singles – 2nd round	(Russia) Svetlana Kuznetsova [8]	(Germany) Tatjana Malek	6–2, 6–2
Men's doubles – 1st round	(Australia) Adam Feeney (Australia) Robert Smeets	(Argentina) Guillermo Cañas (Russia) Marat Safin	6–4, 6–1
Men's singles – 2nd round	(United States) James Blake [9]	(France) Sébastien de Chaunac	6–3, 6–2, 6–3
Colored background means night matches

=== Day 5 (23 January) ===
Day five of the tournament saw the commencement of third round matches in the singles event, where seed started playing against each other. In men's singles, defending champion Novak Djokovic was made to work hard against his Bosnian-born American opponent, lucky loser Amer Delić, but eventually saw off his opponent in four tough sets. 8th seeded Juan Martín del Potro was heavily tested by unseeded Gilles Müller as well, but prevailed in four sets as well, while 7th seed Andy Roddick continued on a collision course with Djokovic with an easier passage against Fabrice Santoro, winning in straight sets and firing 22 aces along his way to just four by the Frenchman. Marin Čilić continued his fine form by defeating last year's quarterfinalist, 11th seed David Ferrer, while Tommy Robredo ended the journey of Yen-hsun Lu with an easy victory, and Tomáš Berdych created a minor upset by defeating 15th seed Stanislas Wawrinka in four. Later at night, Roger Federer clashed with Marat Safin in a repeat of the 2004 finals and 2005 semifinals in an exciting matchup in Rod Laver Arena. The second seed was on form and sent out a strong signal to his rivals with a convincing 6–3, 6–2, 7–6(5) victory. 2006 finalist Marcos Baghdatis also sent 23rd seed Mardy Fish packing with a straight sets victory and set up a fourth round clash with Djokovic.

In the women's draw, following Venus William's exit the day before, Ana Ivanovic replaced her as the highest seed to fall so far, losing 5–7, 7–6(5), 2–6 to 29th seed Alisa Kleybanova. Ivanovic, finalist last year broke Kleybanova in 10th game of the second set when the latter was serving for the match, and brought the match to the decider by winning a tiebreak, but ultimately conceded the match to her younger Russian opponent as Kleybanova ran away with a 6–2 victory in the third. Earlier in the night session, Jelena Dokić continued her fairytale comeback to Grand Slam tennis by upsetting 11th seeded Danish teenager Caroline Wozniacki, despite losing the first set she bounced back strongly to take the next two 6–1, 6–2, and will meet Kleybanova next. Elsewhere, earlier in the day, it was business as usual for the top 16 seeds. Top seed Jelena Janković was once again tested but overcame the heat and Ai Sugiyama in straight sets, and will face Marion Bartoli next, the Frenchwoman coming back from one set down to beat Lucie Šafářová. Dinara Safina also displayed her form and cruise past Kaia Kanepi with the loss of just four games, playing 15th seed Alizé Cornet next, after Cornet recovered from one set down to knock out last year's semifinalist Daniela Hantuchová. 10th seed Nadia Petrova was the first to advance after winning one set against Galina Voskoboeva, after which the latter retired with an injury, and set up a last 16 clash with Vera Zvonareva, who eased past Sara Errani.

- Seeds out:
  - Men's Singles: (Spain) David Ferrer, (Switzerland) Stanislas Wawrinka, (Russia) Marat Safin, (United States) Mardy Fish
  - Women's Singles: (Slovakia) Daniela Hantuchová, (Estonia) Kaia Kanepi, (Japan) Ai Sugiyama, (Denmark) Caroline Wozniacki, (Serbia) Ana Ivanovic

In men's doubles action, the upset of the day was created by unseeded Łukasz Kubot and Oliver Marach, when they knocked out the top seeds Daniel Nestor and Nenad Zimonjić in straight sets, in a day of upsets for the men's doubles which saw a total of five seeds being knocked out of the competition, including defending champion Andy Ram, partnering Max Mirnyi this year, crashing out to Spanish Davis Cup winning pair of Feliciano López and Fernando Verdasco. Seeds moved on in the women's doubles, with the exception of Tatiana Poutchek and Anastasia Rodionova, who lost to Anna-Lena Grönefeld and Patty Schnyder. Mixed doubles competition also began, but none of the seeds in action made it to the second round, with Alona Bondarenko/André Sá losing a match tie-break to Alizé Cornet/Marcelo Melo, Květa Peschke/Pavel Vízner losing to last year's finalists Sania Mirza/Mahesh Bhupathi, and Kateryna Bondarenko/Jordan Kerr defeated by Jarmila Gajdošová/Samuel Groth.

  - Men's Doubles: (Canada) Daniel Nestor/ (Serbia) Nenad Zimonjić, (Brazil) Marcelo Melo/André Sá, (Belarus) Max Mirnyi/ (Israel) Andy Ram, (Germany) Christopher Kas/ (Netherlands) Rogier Wassen, (Slovakia) Travis Parrott/Filip Polášek
  - Women's Doubles: (Belarus) Tatiana Poutchek/ (Russia) Anastasia Rodionova
  - Mixed Doubles: (Ukraine) Kateryna Bondarenko/ (Australia) Jordan Kerr; (Ukraine) Alona Bondarenko/ (Brazil) André Sá, (Czech Republic) Květa Peschke/Pavel Vízner.
- Schedule of Play

Matches on main courts
Matches on Rod Laver Arena
Event	Winner	Loser	Score
Women's singles – 3rd round	(Russia) Dinara Safina [3]	(Estonia) Kaia Kanepi [25]	6–2, 6–2
Men's singles – 3rd round	(Serbia) Novak Djokovic [3]	(United States) Amer Delić	6–2, 4–6, 6–3, 7–6^{(7–4)}
Women's singles – 3rd round	(Serbia) Jelena Janković [1]	(Japan) Ai Sugiyama [26]	6–4, 6–4
Women's singles – 3rd round	(Australia) Jelena Dokić	(Denmark) Caroline Wozniacki [11]	3–6, 6–1, 6–2
Men's singles – 3rd round	(Switzerland) Roger Federer [2]	(Russia) Marat Safin [26]	6–3, 6–2, 7–6^{(7–5)}
Matches on Hisense Arena
Event	Winner	Loser	Score
Men's singles – 3rd round	(Argentina) Juan Martín del Potro [8]	(Luxembourg) Gilles Müller	6–7^{(5–7)}, 7–5, 6–3, 7–5
Women's singles – 3rd round	(France) Alizé Cornet [15]	(Slovakia) Daniela Hantuchová [19]	4–6, 6–4, 6–2
Men's singles – 3rd round	(United States) Andy Roddick [7]	(France) Fabrice Santoro	6–3, 6–4, 6–2
Women's singles – 3rd round	(Russia) Alisa Kleybanova [29]	(Serbia) Ana Ivanovic [5]	7–5, 6–7^{(5–7)}, 6–2
Men's singles – 3rd round	(Cyprus) Marcos Baghdatis	(United States) Mardy Fish [23]	6–2, 6–4, 6–4
Matches on Margaret Court Arena
Event	Winner	Loser	Score
Women's singles – 3rd round	(Russia) Nadia Petrova [10]	(Kazakhstan) Galina Voskoboeva	6–1, RET
Men's singles – 3rd round	(Croatia) Marin Čilić [19]	(Spain) David Ferrer [11]	7–6^{(7–5)}, 6–3, 6–4
Women's singles – 3rd round	(France) Marion Bartoli [16]	(Czech Republic) Lucie Šafářová	3–6, 6–2, 6–1
Women's doubles – 2nd round	(Australia) Samantha Stosur [5] (Australia) Rennae Stubbs [5]	(Poland) Agnieszka Radwańska (Poland) Urszula Radwańska	6–1, 6–4
Men's singles – 3rd round	(Czech Republic) Tomáš Berdych [20]	(Switzerland) Stanislas Wawrinka [15]	4–6, 6–1, 6–3, 6–4
Colored background means night matches

=== Day 6 (24 January) ===
The top seeds in the upper half of the men's draw did not have much trouble in progressing into the last 16. Rafael Nadal made it to the next round with a solid 6–4, 6–2, 6–2 victory over former World No. 2 Tommy Haas, producing over 50 winners and just eight unforced errors. 13th seed Fernando González is up next for the Spaniard, after the latter came back from the dead against 24th seeded Frenchman Richard Gasquet in a 249-minute thriller, in which both players exhibit barrages of winners, and a gripping third set tiebreak in which both had opportunities to take the set, or the match for Gasquet, and eventually it was González who prevailed 12–10 in the decider. Andy Murray comfortably won his match against Jürgen Melzer as well, 7–5, 6–0, 6–3, and set up a tie with 14th seed Fernando Verdasco. The Spaniard was clearly on form as he completed a 6–4, 6–0, 6–0 thrashing of Radek Štěpánek, the same player who beat him in the Brisbane International final just two weeks before. Gilles Simon and Gaël Monfils set up an all-French fourth round encounter after powering past their opponents, unseeded Croat Mario Ančić and 17th seed Nicolás Almagro. In contrast, Jo-Wilfried Tsonga need to overcome a third set lapse before defeating Dudi Sela in four and will play James Blake in the last 16, who dropped one set against Igor Andreev as well.

Serena Williams was the first among the women seeds to progress to the last 16 in Day Six, firing 10 aces on her way to a 6–1, 6–4 win over Chinese Peng Shuai. Belarusian teenager Victoria Azarenka awaits her in the next round, the 13th seed sending the only other former champion in the draw, 20th seed Amélie Mauresmo packing in a closely fought contest. Elena Dementieva continued on her excellent form this season, this time edging local hope Samantha Stosur in two tight sets, 7–6(6), 6–4, to set up a tie with another teenage star, 18th seed Dominika Cibulková, who defeat Virginie Razzano in straight sets to progress to the last 16 of a Grand Slam for the first time. Svetlana Kuznetsova is also through to the next round, overcoming 68 unforced errors from her racket to beat Alona Bondarenko. Alona's sister Kateryna also lost, crushed 6–2, 6–2 by Wimbledon semifinalist Zheng Jie, who will now play Kuznetsova. Elsewhere, Anabel Medina Garrigues posted a minor upset by powering past 12th seed Flavia Pennetta, and will now play unseeded Carla Suárez Navarro, Venus Williams' victor who cruised past compatriot María José Martínez Sánchez.

- Seeds out
  - Men's Singles: (Spain) Nicolás Almagro, (Russia) Igor Andreev, (Czech Republic) Radek Štěpánek, (France) Richard Gasquet, (Austria) Jürgen Melzer
  - Women's Singles: (Italy) Flavia Pennetta, (France) Amélie Mauresmo, (Ukraine) Alona Bondarenko

Seeds continued to tumble in the second round of the men's doubles, including 5th seeds Wesley Moodie and Jeff Coetzee, who lost to local wildcards Joseph Sirianni and Andrew Coelho, František Čermák/Michal Mertiňák losing to another local pairing in Paul Hanley/Jordan Kerr, and Martin Damm/Robert Lindstedt, who were upset by Mardy Fish/John Isner, while former champions Bob and Mike Bryan are safely through. Women's top seeds Cara Black and Liezel Huber went through to the next round as well, along with Victoria Azarenka/Vera Zvonareva, Daniela Hantuchová/Ai Sugiyama, Květa Peschke/Lisa Raymond while Sorana Cîrstea/Monica Niculescu fell to Nathalie Dechy/Mara Santangelo.

The seeds also went 1–1 in the first round of mixed doubles competition, with second seeds Yan Zi/Mark Knowles defeating Nadia Petrova/Max Mirnyi while third seeds Lisa Raymond/Marcin Matkowski losing to Iveta Benešová/Lukáš Dlouhý.

  - Men's Doubles: (Czech Republic) František Čermák/ (Slovakia) Michal Mertiňák, (South Africa) Wesley Moodie/Jeff Coetzee, (Czech Republic) Martin Damm/ (Sweden) Robert Lindstedt
  - Women's Doubles: (Romania) Sorana Cîrstea/Monica Niculescu
  - Mixed Doubles: (United States) Lisa Raymond/ (Poland) Marcin Matkowski.
- Schedule of Play

Matches on main courts
Matches on Rod Laver Arena
Event	Winner	Loser	Score
Women's singles – 3rd round	(United States) Serena Williams [2]	(China) Peng Shuai	6–1, 6–4
Women's singles – 3rd round	(Belarus) Victoria Azarenka [13]	(France) Amélie Mauresmo [20]	6–4, 6–2
Men's singles – 3rd round	(France) Jo-Wilfried Tsonga [5]	(Israel) Dudi Sela	6–4, 6–2, 1–6, 6–1
Women's singles – 3rd round	(Russia) Elena Dementieva [4]	(Australia) Samantha Stosur	7–6(6), 6–4
Men's singles – 3rd round	(Spain) Rafael Nadal [1]	(Germany) Tommy Haas	6–4, 6–2, 6–2
Matches on Hisense Arena
Event	Winner	Loser	Score
Men's singles – 3rd round	(France) Gaël Monfils [12]	(Spain) Nicolás Almagro [17]	6–4, 6–3, 7–5
Women's singles – 3rd round	(Russia) Svetlana Kuznetsova [8]	(Ukraine) Alona Bondarenko [31]	7–6(7), 6–4
Men's singles – 3rd round	(United States) James Blake [9]	(Russia) Igor Andreev [18]	6–3, 6–2, 3–6, 6–1
Men's singles – 3rd round	(United Kingdom) Andy Murray [4]	(Austria) Jürgen Melzer [31]	7–5, 6–0, 6–3
Women's doubles – 2nd round	(Australia) Casey Dellacqua [12] (Italy) Francesca Schiavone [12]	(Russia) Alla Kudryavtseva (Russia) Ekaterina Makarova	6–4, 6–3
Matches on Margaret Court Arena
Event	Winner	Loser	Score
Women's singles – 3rd round	(Spain) Anabel Medina Garrigues [21]	(Italy) Flavia Pennetta [12]	6–4, 6–1
Men's singles – 3rd round	(France) Gilles Simon [6]	(Croatia) Mario Ančić	7–6(2), 6–4, 6–2
Women's singles – 3rd round	(Slovakia) Dominika Cibulková [18]	(France) Virginie Razzano	7–5, 7–5
Mixed doubles – 1st round	(Canada) Aleksandra Wozniak (Canada) Daniel Nestor	(Australia) Monika Wejnert (Australia) Bernard Tomic	6–3, 6–2
Men's singles – 3rd round	(Chile) Fernando González [13]	(France) Richard Gasquet [24]	3–6, 3–6, 7–6(10), 6–2, 12–10
Colored background means night matches

=== Day 7 (25 January) ===
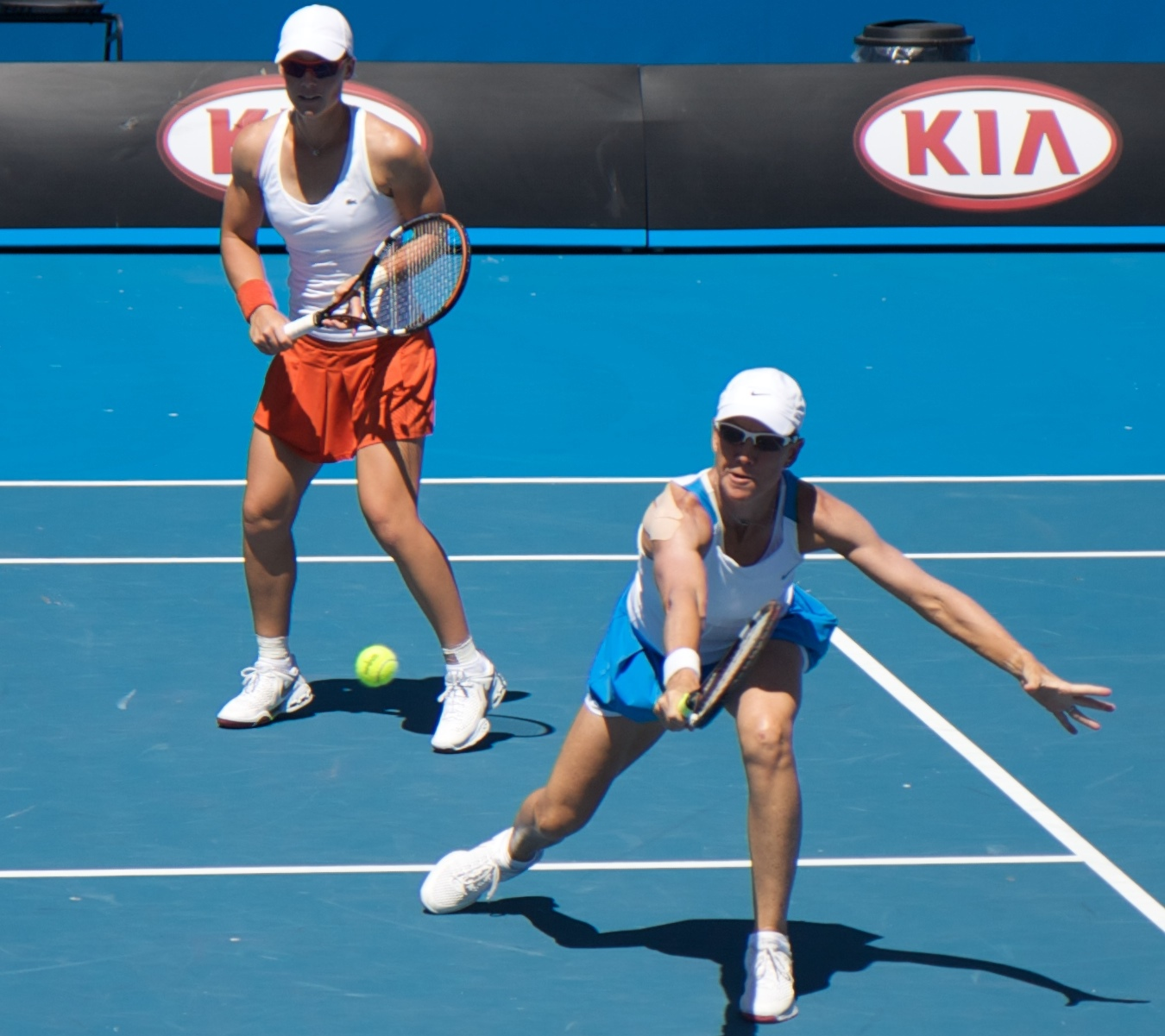
Samantha Stosur/Rennae Stubbs.

4th round matches begin with 8th seed Juan Martín del Potro advancing into his first Australian Open quarterfinals after recovering from a one set deficit to beat 19th seeded Marin Čilić. Both players were tipped to be highly successful in the future, but it was del Potro who stood firm with less error count as he prevailed 5–7, 6–4, 6–4, 6–2 and will play three-time champion, world no. 2 Roger Federer. Federer himself survived the challenge from 20th seeded Tomáš Berdych, who have not beaten him since their first encounter in the 2004 Athens Olympic Games. Berdych looked sharper of the two, showing little nerves as he went two sets up, but Federer came out firing from the third set onwards, and eventually came through safely, winning 4–6, 6–7(4), 6–4, 6–4, 6–2. 7th seed Andy Roddick also moved on to the quarterfinals with a comprehensive 7–5, 6–1, 6–3 victory over Tommy Robredo, and will play defending champion Novak Djokovic for a place in his 4th Australian Open semifinals. Djokovic looked impressive early on against former finalist Marcos Baghdatis, racing to a 6–1 first set victory, but the Cypriot gave him a much harder time, though giving up a one-break lead in the second set to lose a tiebreak and winning another third set tiebreak. However, the defending champion was too hot to handle and eventually by 2.30 am, Djokovic has sealed a 6–1, 7–6(1), 6–7(5), 6–2 victory in over three hours.

In the women's draw, top seeded Jelena Janković's quest for a maiden Grand Slam title came to a premature end in one of the shocks of the day, as 16th seed Marion Bartoli displayed her best tennis in two sets to dump the Serbian 6–1, 6–4, meaning Janković's world number one crown could be in danger. 7th seeded Vera Zvonareva also made it to her first Australian Open semifinals, after coming through in two tough sets against compatriot and 10th seeded Nadia Petrova, 7–5, 6–4. 3rd seed Dinara Safina almost followed Janković's path out of the tournament, as she survived two match points against Alizé Cornet, who was serving for the match while 2–6, 6–2, 5–4 up, but eventually lost the decider 7–5. Safina's opponent in the quarterfinals would be a resurgent Jelena Dokić, who, in the first match of the night session in Rod Laver Arena, defeated 29th seed Alisa Kleybanova in a three-hour match, 7–5, 5–7, 8–6, despite needing a medical time out towards the end of the decider. The Australian hang tough to break Kleybanova to love in the final game, sealing a famous win.

- Seeded players out: Marin Čilić, Tomáš Berdych, Tommy Robredo; Jelena Janković, Nadia Petrova, Alizé Cornet, Alisa Kleybanova

Doubles play continue with 2nd seeds Bob and Mike Bryan progressing to a quarterfinal clash against compatriots Mardy Fish and John Isner, who sent 7th seeds Bruno Soares/Kevin Ullyett out of the tournament. 6th seeded Mariusz Fyrstenberg and Marcin Matkowski and unseeded Feliciano López/Fernando Verdasco also advanced to the quarterfinals. The top women seeds were not as lucky as four of the top eight pairs were sent crashing out, with Anabel Medina Garrigues/Virginia Ruano Pascual suffering a heavy defeat at the hands of 16th seeds Peng Shuai/Hsieh Su-wei, 3rd seeds Květa Peschke/Lisa Raymond losing to Nathalie Dechy/Mara Santangelo, 5th seeds Rennae Stubbs/Samantha Stosur defeated by Venus and Serena Williams while 6th seeds Yan Zi/Zheng Jie lost to Nuria Llagostera Vives/María José Martínez Sánchez.

- Seeded players out: Bruno Soares/Kevin Ullyett; Anabel Medina Garrigues/Virginia Ruano Pascual, Yan Zi/Zheng Jie, Samantha Stosur/Rennae Stubbs, Květa Peschke/Lisa Raymond
- Schedule of Play

Matches on main courts
Matches on Rod Laver Arena
Event	Winner	Loser	Score
Women's singles – 4th round	(France) Marion Bartoli [16]	(Serbia) Jelena Janković [1]	6–1, 6–4
Women's singles – 4th round	(Russia) Dinara Safina [3]	(France) Alizé Cornet [15]	6–2, 2–6, 7–5
Men's singles – 4th round	(Switzerland) Roger Federer [2]	(Czech Republic) Tomáš Berdych	4–6, 6–7(4), 6–4, 6–4, 6–2
Women's singles – 4th round	(Australia) Jelena Dokić	(Russia) Alisa Kleybanova [29]	7–5, 5–7, 8–6
Men's singles – 4th round	(Serbia) Novak Djokovic [3]	(Cyprus) Marcos Baghdatis	6–1, 7–6(1), 6–7(5), 6–2
Matches on Hisense Arena
Event	Winner	Loser	Score
Men's singles – 4th round	(Argentina) Juan Martín del Potro [8]	(Croatia) Marin Čilić [19]	5–7, 6–4, 6–4, 6–2
Women's singles – 4th round	(Russia) Vera Zvonareva [7]	(Russia) Nadia Petrova [10]	7–5, 6–4
Men's singles – 4th round	(United States) Andy Roddick [7]	(Spain) Tommy Robredo [21]	7–5, 6–1, 6–3
Matches on Margaret Court Arena
Event	Winner	Loser	Score
Mixed doubles – 2nd round	(India) Sania Mirza (India) Mahesh Bhupathi	(Australia) Anastasia Rodionova (Australia) Stephen Huss	6–1, 6–2
Men's doubles – 3rd round	(United States) Mardy Fish (United States) John Isner	(Brazil) Bruno Soares [7] (Zimbabwe) Kevin Ullyett [7]	6–2, 7–6(7)
Women's doubles – 3rd round	(United States) Serena Williams [10] (United States) Venus Williams [10]	(Australia) Samantha Stosur [5] (Australia) Rennae Stubbs [5]	6–4, 6–2
Mixed doubles – 1st round	(United States) Liezel Huber [4] (United Kingdom) Jamie Murray [4]	(Australia) Sophie Ferguson (Australia) Chris Guccione	6–2, 7–5
Legends' doubles	(Australia) Wayne Arthurs (Australia) Pat Cash	(Australia) Wally Masur (Australia) Patrick Rafter	6–2, 6–4
Colored background means night matches

=== Day 8 (26 January) ===
Day eight saw the remaining fourth round men's matches with a warm forecast to complement Australia Day. However it was quite a disappointing day with three seeded players from both men and women's draw retiring due to various reasons. In Rod Laver Arena, 6th seeded Gilles Simon battled against his in-form countrymen, 12th seed Gaël Monfils, with Simon taking the first set 6–4 only for Monfils to hit back 6–2. However, he began to show signs of suffering in the third set and after a medical timeout while 4–1 down and eventually losing the set, Monfils retired citing a wrist injury, sending Simon to his first Grand Slam quarterfinals, where he will face top seed Rafael Nadal. Nadal appeared to be in complete control over Fernando González, easily winning the first two sets and coming through the third set with heavier resistance from the Chilean, but the Spaniard never looked in doubt in his quest for a first Australian Open title. However, the surprise of the day came when 4th seeded Andy Murray, tipped by many as a favourite to win the title, crashed out to an in-form Fernando Verdasco, despite leading by 2 sets to 1. Verdasco, who had only lost twelve games on his way to the fourth round, came out firing in the last two sets, serving with astonishing accuracy, and won 85% of his first serves to outlast the Scot 2–6, 6–1, 1–6, 6–3, 6–4, and set up a quarterfinal tie with Jo-Wilfried Tsonga, who sent James Blake packing with a straight sets victory, meaning Murray was the only top eight seed to not make it to the quarterfinals.

In the women's draw, following Monfils' withdrawal earlier on, Victoria Azarenka and Serena Williams took the court earlier than expected, and it was the young Belarusian who made the better start, breaking the three-time champion twice to take the first set 6–3. However, after a missing chances to go 2–0 up in the second, Azarenka started to show signs of discomfort and was broken instead to trail 3–2, and a medical timeout couldn't do the wonders as the youngster retired in tears after another game. Azarenka later explained that she had been throwing up all morning and was feeling weak, but thought she could play after feeling better before her game, but ultimately succumbed. Williams went through to the quarterfinals, where she will play 8th seeded Svetlana Kuznetsova, who benefited from yet another withdrawal, in the form of 22nd seed Zheng Jie, who retired after five games with a wrist injury she picked up in the third game after falling and landing awkwardly on her hand. Elena Dementieva advanced with her fourteenth win of the season, this time dominating Slovakia's 18th seed Dominika Cibulková, 6–2, 6–2, and will play another giantkiller, unseeded Carla Suárez Navarro in the quarterfinals, the latter easily dispatching compatriot and 21st seed Anabel Medina Garrigues 6–3, 6–2 earlier in the day.

- Seeded players out: Andy Murray, Gaël Monfils, Fernando González, James Blake; Victoria Azarenka, Dominika Cibulková, Anabel Medina Garrigues, Zheng Jie.

In men's doubles, 4th seeds Lukáš Dlouhý and Leander Paes advanced into the quarterfinals after defeating local pairing of Paul Hanley/Jordan Kerr, while Joseph Sirianni/Andrew Coelho also lost to Simone Bolelli/Andreas Seppi. 3rd seeds Mahesh Bhupathi/Mark Knowles and unseeded Łukasz Kubot/Oliver Marach filled in the remaining quarterfinal slots with straight sets victory over their respective opponents. In the women's side, top seeded Cara Black and Liezel Huber advanced after Victoria Azarenka, partnering Vera Zvonareva pulled out with an illness, and 7th seeds Flavia Pennetta/Maria Kirilenko also conceded a walkover to Casey Dellacqua/Francesca Schiavone due to Pennetta suffering from right foot bursitis. 9th seeds Daniela Hantuchová/Ai Sugiyama won through easily against Ágnes Szávay/Elena Vesnina, and Anna-Lena Grönefeld/Patty Schnyder also won. In mixed doubles second seeds Yan Zi/Mark Knowles were also shown the exit in the second round by Canadians Aleksandra Wozniak/Daniel Nestor, while 7th seeds Anabel Medina Garrigues/Tommy Robredo won their first round match.

- Seeded players out: Victoria Azarenka/Vera Zvonareva, Maria Kirilenko/Flavia Pennetta; Yan Zi/Mark Knowles.
- Schedule of Play

Matches on main courts
Matches on Rod Laver Arena
Event	Winner	Loser	Score
Men's singles – 4th round	(France) Gilles Simon [6]	(France) Gaël Monfils [12]	6–4, 2–6, 6–1 Ret.
Women's singles – 4th round	(United States) Serena Williams [2]	(Belarus) Victoria Azarenka [13]	3–6, 4–2 Ret.
Men's singles – 4th round	(Spain) Rafael Nadal [1]	(Chile) Fernando González	6–3, 6–2, 6–4
Men's singles – 4th round	(France) Jo-Wilfried Tsonga [5]	(United States) James Blake [9]	6–4, 6–4, 7–6(3)
Men's doubles – 3rd round	(Czech Republic) Lukáš Dlouhý [4] (India) Leander Paes [4]	(Australia) Paul Hanley (Australia) Jordan Kerr	6–2, 7–5
Matches on Hisense Arena
Event	Winner	Loser	Score
Women's singles – 4th round	(Spain) Carla Suárez Navarro	(Spain) Anabel Medina Garrigues [21]	6–3, 6–2
Women's singles – 4th round	(Russia) Elena Dementieva [4]	(Slovakia) Dominika Cibulková [18]	6–2, 6–2
Women's singles – 4th round	(Russia) Svetlana Kuznetsova [8]	(China) Zheng Jie [22]	4–1 Ret.
Men's singles – 4th round	(Spain) Fernando Verdasco [14]	(United Kingdom) Andy Murray [4]	2–6, 6–1, 1–6, 6–3, 6–4
Matches on Margaret Court Arena
Event	Winner	Loser	Score
Women's doubles – 3rd round	(Slovakia) Daniela Hantuchová [9] (Japan) Ai Sugiyama [9]	(Hungary) Ágnes Szávay (Russia) Elena Vesnina	6–1, 6–2
Legends' doubles	(France) Henri Leconte (Australia) Mark Philippoussis	(Sweden) Mats Wilander (Sweden) Joakim Nyström	6–7(6), 6–3, [10–5]
Men's doubles – 3rd round	(Poland) Łukasz Kubot (Austria) Oliver Marach	(Australia) Carsten Bell (Australia) Chris Guccione	6–2, 6–4
Women's doubles – 3rd round	(Zimbabwe) Cara Black [1] (United States) Liezel Huber [1]	(Belarus) Victoria Azarenka [13] (Russia) Vera Zvonareva [13]	Walkover
Mixed doubles – 2nd round	(Canada) Aleksandra Wozniak (Canada) Daniel Nestor	(China) Yan Zi [2] (The Bahamas) Mark Knowles [2]	7–6(8), 6–4
Colored background means night matches

=== Day 9 (27 January) ===
In the first quarterfinal match of the day, women's 7th seed Vera Zvonareva was at her best, despite falling behind 3–1 in the first set as 16th seed Marion Bartoli seemed to have set up the decisive break. Zvonareva, who have yet to concede a set throughout the tournament, hit back strongly, moving her opponent around the court and hitting clean winners while errors started to flow from Bartoli's racket with alarming regularity as her game started to beak apart. In the end, it was Zvonareva who reeled off eleven straight games as she routed the Frenchwoman 6–3, 6–0, advancing to her maiden Grand Slam semifinal. 3rd seed Dinara Safina had a tough opponent in the form of Jelena Dokić, who had defeated three seeded players on her way to the quarterfinals and had won all her matches in three sets so far. The two players traded breaks regularly as they shared the first two sets, Safina taking the first 6–4 but losing the second by the same scoreline. Dokić, with strong local support behind her, continued to battle bravely, breaking Safina to level things at 4–4 in the decider but in the end, Safina's stamina and speed prevailed as she wrapped up the match 6–4, 4–6, 6–4, and progress to the semifinals, while Dokić exited the tournament, but can be assured of a return to the top 100 in the post-tournament rankings.

In the men's draw, Novak Djokovic's reign as the defending champion came to an abrupt end after he forfeited his match against Andy Roddick while 7–6(3), 4–6, 2–6, 1–2 down, due to heat stress. Djokovic had started shakily, winning a tiebreak after both players failed to force a break point on their opponent's serve, but some inspired play by Djokovic saw him taking the tiebreak. Roddick, however, was too strong on his own serve in the second set, dropping just two points and eventually taking the second set 6–4. Djokovic was clearly not himself from the beginning of the third set, and laboured for the final eleven games of the match battling cramps and heat stress before finally decided to give up after he was broken to love in the third game of the 4th set, handing Roddick a 4th semifinal appearance in Melbourne Park. Roddick will face a familiar foe in second seed Roger Federer next, after the Swiss recorded an astonishingly easy victory over Juan Martín del Potro, who is playing in just his second Grand Slam quarterfinal. After losing the first set 6–3, del Potro seemed to have given up while Federer only appeared more devastating as the match progressed, before recording a 6–3, 6–0, 6–0 victory, after which the Argentine admitted that there was little he could do against Federer if he was not playing well.

- Seeded players out: Novak Djokovic, Juan Martín del Potro; Marion Bartoli.

The women doubles semifinals lineup was also completed. 9th seeded Daniela Hantuchová and Ai Sugiyama reached the semifinals after ending the dreams of co-world number ones Cara Black and Liezel Huber in three sets, winning a third set tiebreak 12–10, and will be up against unseeded Nathalie Dechy and Mara Santangelo next, the French-Italian pairing coming from behind to send Spanish 11th seeds Nuria Llagostera Vives/María José Martínez Sánchez packing. The other semifinal match will be between French Open runners-up Casey Dellacqua/Francesca Schiavone against the Williams sisters, Venus and Serena, with the 12th seeded Australian-Italian pair coming back from a first set bagel to defeat Anna-Lena Grönefeld/Patty Schnyder while the 10th seeds needed 3 sets to get past Hsieh Su-wei/Peng Shuai as well. In men's doubles, giantkillers Łukasz Kubot/Oliver Marach defeated another seeded team, 6th seeds Mariusz Fyrstenberg/Marcin Matkowski and will play 3rd seeds Mahesh Bhupathi/Mark Knowles in the semifinals.

In mixed doubles, it was a bad day for Black and Huber as well as the top seeded Cara Black and Leander Paes crashed out to the unseeded pairing of Patty Schnyder/Wesley Moodie, while Liezel Huber and Jamie Murray lost to Nathalie Dechy/Andy Ram. 7th seeds Anabel Medina Garrigues/Tommy Robredo and unseeded Iveta Benešová/Lukáš Dlouhý made it to the quarterfinals, both with wins in a match tie-break against their respective opponents, leaving Medina Garrigues and Robredo as the only seeded team left.

- Seeded players out: Mariusz Fyrstenberg/Marcin Matkowski; Cara Black/Liezel Huber, Nuria Llagostera Vives/María José Martínez Sánchez, Hsieh Su-wei/Peng Shuai; Liezel Huber/Jamie Murray, Cara Black/Leander Paes.
- Schedule of Play

Matches on main courts
Matches on Rod Laver Arena
Event	Winner	Loser	Score
Women's doubles – Quarterfinals	(Australia) Casey Dellacqua [12] (Italy) Francesca Schiavone [12]	(Germany) Anna-Lena Grönefeld (Switzerland) Patty Schnyder	0–6, 7–5, 6–1
Women's singles – Quarterfinals	(Russia) Vera Zvonareva [7]	(France) Marion Bartoli [16]	6–3, 6–0
Men's singles – Quarterfinals	(United States) Andy Roddick [7]	(Serbia) Novak Djokovic [3]	6–7(3), 6–4, 6–2, 2–1 Ret.
Women's singles – Quarterfinals	(Russia) Dinara Safina [3]	(Australia) Jelena Dokić	6–4, 4–6, 6–4
Men's singles – Quarterfinals	(Switzerland) Roger Federer [2]	(Argentina) Juan Martín del Potro [8]	6–3, 6–0, 6–0
Matches on Margaret Court Arena
Event	Winner	Loser	Score
Women's doubles – Quarterfinals	(Slovakia) Daniela Hantuchová [9] (Japan) Ai Sugiyama [9]	(Zimbabwe) Cara Black [1] (United States) Liezel Huber [1]	6–7(0), 6–3, 7–6(10)
Women's doubles – Quarterfinals	(United States) Serena Williams [10] (United States) Venus Williams [10]	(Chinese Taipei) Su-Wei Hsieh [16] (China) Peng Shuai [16]	6–2, 4–6, 6–3
Legends' doubles	(Australia) Wally Masur (Australia) Patrick Rafter	(Australia) Peter McNamara (Australia) Paul McNamee	6–4, 6–4
Mixed doubles – 2nd round	(France) Nathalie Dechy (Israel) Andy Ram	(United States) Liezel Huber [4] (United Kingdom) Jamie Murray [4]	6–7(6), 6–2, [10–4]
Colored background means night matches

=== Day 10 (28 January) ===
Day ten of the competition saw temperatures reaching as high as 43 degrees Celsius, causing the extreme heat policy (EHP) to be implemented for the first time this year. As part of the policy, all outdoor matches were suspended and eventually cancelled, affecting many junior matches, and also legends and wheelchair tournaments. Play continued in the main stadiums, with Svetlana Kuznetsova, apparently more comfortable than her opponent Serena Williams in the blistering heat, taking the first set 7–5 despite failing to close the set while serving at 5–4 up. However, the momentum swung over to Williams' side, after the match was interrupted for closing the roof of the stadium due to the implementation of the EHP. Kuznetsova, visibly unhappy at the interruption, hang in tough to break Williams again and went 5–3 up, but will rue missing a golden opportunity to make her first Australian Open semifinal as Williams won 4 games in a row to take the second set 7–5, and blasted her way through the third 6–1, winning ten out of the last eleven games to destroy the Russian's dream of an all-Russian semifinal, following Elena Dementieva's 15th win of the season. The 4th seeded Russian proved too good for surprise package Carla Suárez Navarro, playing in her second Grand Slam quarterfinal in just four Grand Slam main draw appearances, though the 6–2, 6–2 scoreline did not clearly reflect the closeness of the match, as the young Canary Island resident had numerous chances to break back against Dementieva, only to be saved by the in-form Russian each time.

The second semifinal match in the men's singles has also been decided when top seed Rafael Nadal set up an all-Spanish encounter with compatriot, 14th seed Fernando Verdasco. Nadal experienced momentum swings against 6th seeded Gilles Simon, winning the first set 6–2 with ease, but had to come from behind in the next two sets, including saving a set point in the second set, but eventually breaking Simon to win both sets 7–5, and continued his march to a first Australian Open crown after advancing to a second straight semifinals without dropping a set. Hopes of a rematch of last year's semifinals were dashed after Jo-Wilfried Tsonga was sent out of the tournament in four sets against a fired up Fernando Verdasco, who had been on song since winning the Davis Cup for Spain at the end of last year. Tsonga's serve appeared impenetrable early on, while Verdasco was forced to save break points but raced to a 5–2 lead in the tiebreaker before eventually winning 7–2. Tsonga hit back with his first break which sealed the second set, but Verdasco's serve once again proved to be the deciding factor as Tsonga's falter, Verdasco racing to a 4–0 lead in the third and converting all four break opportunities he has, in contrast to Tsonga's two out of thirteen, and powered into his maiden Grand Slam semifinals 7–6(2), 3–6, 6–3, 6–2.

- Seeded players out: Jo-Wilfried Tsonga, Gilles Simon; Svetlana Kuznetsova

In men's doubles, second seeds Bob and Mike Bryan advanced to the semifinals with a hard-fought win over compatriots Mardy Fish/John Isner, where they will take on 4th seeds Lukáš Dlouhý/Leander Paes in a rematch of last year's US Open final, who ended the journey of Italians Simone Bolelli/Andreas Seppi. The mixed doubles semifinals lineup is also completed with 7th seeds Anabel Medina Garrigues/Tommy Robredo defeating Patty Schnyder/Wesley Moodie in a match tie-break, and will play Nathalie Dechy/Andy Ram after the unseeded pair defeat Dominika Cibulková/Jürgen Melzer in straight sets. Last year's finalists Sania Mirza/Mahesh Bhupathi also won through against Aleksandra Wozniak/Daniel Nestor, and will play Czechs Iveta Benešová/Lukáš Dlouhý, who received a walkover from Alizé Cornet/Marcelo Melo.

- Seeded players out: None
- Schedule of Play

Matches on main courts
Matches on Rod Laver Arena
Event	Winner	Loser	Score
Women's singles – quarterfinals	(Russia) Elena Dementieva [4]	(Spain) Carla Suárez Navarro	6–2, 6–2
Women's singles – quarterfinals	(United States) Serena Williams [2]	(Russia) Svetlana Kuznetsova [8]	5–7, 7–5, 6–1
Men's singles – quarterfinals	(Spain) Fernando Verdasco [14]	(France) Jo-Wilfried Tsonga	7–6(2), 3–6, 6–3, 6–2
Men's singles – quarterfinals	(Spain) Rafael Nadal [1]	(France) Gilles Simon [6]	6–2, 7–5, 7–5
Men's doubles – quarterfinals	(United States) Bob Bryan [2] (United States) Mike Bryan(2)	(United States) Mardy Fish (United States) John Isner	7–5, 7–6(6)
Matches on Hisense Arena
Event	Winner	Loser	Score
Mixed doubles – quarterfinals	(France) Nathalie Dechy (Israel) Andy Ram	(Slovakia) Dominika Cibulková (Austria) Jürgen Melzer	7–5, 6–1
Men's doubles – quarterfinals	(Czech Republic) Lukáš Dlouhý [4] (India) Leander Paes [4]	(Italy) Simone Bolelli (Italy) Andreas Seppi	6–1, 7–6(5)
Junior boys' singles – 3rd round	(Germany) Richard Becker	(Japan) Yasutaka Uchiyama	6–7(8), 6–4, 6–3
Men's Wheelchair singles – Quarterfinals	(France) Michaël Jérémiasz	(Sweden) Stefan Olsson	6–4, 6–2
Matches on Margaret Court Arena
Event	Winner	Loser	Score
Mixed doubles – quarterfinals	(India) Sania Mirza (India) Mahesh Bhupathi	(Canada) Aleksandra Wozniak (Canada) Daniel Nestor	3–6, 6–4, [10–5]
Legends' doubles	(Australia) Wally Masur (Australia) Patrick Rafter	(Australia) Darren Cahill (Iran) Mansour Bahrami	4–6, 6–3, [10–7]
Legends doubles	(France) Henri Leconte (Australia) Mark Philippoussis	(Iran) Mansour Bahrami (Australia) John Fitzgerald	Canceled
Colored background means night matches

=== Day 11 (29 January) ===
The women's semifinals were played at Rod Laver Arena with the roof closed due to high temperatures, which eventually caused the Extreme Heat Policy to be invoked for the second day in a row with outdoor matches suspended until evening. Play continued inside with Serena Williams against Elena Dementieva, whom she had lost three matches against. The first two games saw multiple deuces and a couple of break points for both players but ultimately managed to hold serve, and the game proceeded on serve until Williams broke the deadlock in the eighth game and subsequently served out the first set 6–3. Dementieva bounced back strongly to break Williams at the early stages of the second set to open up a 3–0 lead, but her serve began to falter as well, recording a series of double faults as Williams broke back twice to lead 4–3. A series of blistering forehands saw Dementieva getting back into the match but in the end, her serve failed her again and Serena Williams soon served for the match, winning 6–3, 6–4 in 98 minutes, ending Dementieva's unbeaten start to the season and advancing to the women's final for the fourth time. Her opponent will be Dinara Safina, who broke a three-match losing streak as well against Vera Zvonareva. Zvonareva, in her first Grand Slam semifinals, appeared to be more shaky of the two, quickly falling behind against Safina's dictating baseline rallies. Even though Zvonareva managed to break back, she appeared to be troubled by her own serve, until Safina broke again in the 7th game and went on to seal the set 6–3. The second set was a closer affair as Safina began to make unforced errors, trading a break with Zvonareva, until Zvonareva appeared to have the upper hand while serving for the second set at 6–5. Safina, however, broke her opponent to love and from that point onwards she was in control, sealing her second Grand Slam final by winning the tiebreak. Victories for both Williams and Safina ensured that Jelena Janković will surrender her world number one status in the post-tournament rankings to the winner of the finals, and is projected to fall to number 3 in the world.

In the first men's semifinals, Roger Federer was back to his best as he dismantled American Andy Roddick 6–2, 7–5, 7–5 to move on to his fourth Australian Open final, having won the previous three in 2004, 2006 and 2007. Federer was in complete control in the first set, quickly breaking Roddick twice to open up a 5–1 lead, but had to stave off a late Roddick charge to secure the first set 6–2. The second set was much closer, Roddick relying on his big serves and constantly charging to the net to stay in the set, even though Federer looked comfortable and broke the American in the eleventh game, serving out with ease. The third set was similar to the second set, and as Federer sealed the decisive break to lead 6–5, there was no stopping the Swiss as he advanced to the finals, where he awaits the winner between Rafael Nadal and Fernando Verdasco.

- Seeded players out: Andy Roddick; Elena Dementieva, Vera Zvonareva.

The men's and women's doubles semifinals were also concluded, with Bob and Mike Bryan easing past Lukáš Dlouhý and Leander Paes 6–3, 6–3 in just 54 minutes, advancing to their fifth final in six years, while Mahesh Bhupathi and Mark Knowles needed just four more minutes to defeat surprise package Łukasz Kubot and Oliver Marach 6–3, 6–1. The women's doubles finals will be between 9th seeded Daniela Hantuchová/Ai Sugiyama and 10th seeded Venus Williams/Serena Williams. The Slovak-Japanese pairing looked sharp on the way to a 6–4, 6–3 victory over Nathalie Dechy and Mara Santangelo, while the Williams sisters, with Serena fresh from her singles semifinals, crushing 12th seeds Casey Dellacqua/Francesca Schiavone 6–0, 6–2. Nathalie Dechy and Andy Ram were the first to advance to the mixed doubles final, sending the last seeded pair Anabel Medina Garrigues and Tommy Robredo out of the tournament with a 7–6(7), 6–4 win.

- Seeded players out: Lukáš Dlouhý/Leander Paes; Casey Dellacqua/Francesca Schiavone; Anabel Medina Garrigues/Tommy Robredo.
- Schedule of Play

Matches on main courts
Matches on Rod Laver Arena
Event	Winner	Loser	Score
Men's doubles – Semifinals	(India) Mahesh Bhupathi [3] (The Bahamas) Mark Knowles [3]	(Poland) Łukasz Kubot (Austria) Oliver Marach	6–3, 6–1
Legends' doubles	(Republic of Ireland) Mansour Bahrami (Australia) John Fitzgerald	(France) Henri Leconte (Australia) Mark Philippoussis	4–3 Ret.
Women's singles – Semifinals	(United States) Serena Williams [2]	(Russia) Elena Dementieva [4]	6–3, 6–4
Women's singles – Semifinals	(Russia) Dinara Safina [3]	(Russia) Vera Zvonareva [7]	6–3, 7–6(4)
Men's singles – Semifinals	(Switzerland) Roger Federer [2]	(United States) Andy Roddick [7]	6–2, 7–5, 7–5
Exhibition singles	(Australia) Pat Cash	(Sweden) Mats Wilander	6–4, 6–3
Matches on Hisense Arena
Event	Winner	Loser	Score
Women's doubles – Semifinals	(Slovakia) Daniela Hantuchová [9] (Japan) Ai Sugiyama [9]	(France) Nathalie Dechy (Italy) Mara Santangelo	6–4, 6–3
Junior boys' singles – quarterfinals	(Germany) Alexandros Georgoudas	(Chinese Taipei) Hsieh Cheng-peng [15]	7–6(8), 4–6, 6–4
Mixed doubles – semifinals	(France) Nathalie Dechy (Israel) Andy Ram	(Spain) Anabel Medina Garrigues [7] (Spain) Tommy Robredo [7]	7–6(7), 6–4
Junior girls' singles – quarterfinals	(Romania) Ana Bogdan [2]	(France) Kristina Mladenovic [7]	6–4, 6–2
Women's doubles – semifinals	(United States) Serena Williams [10] (United States) Venus Williams [10]	(Australia) Casey Dellacqua [12] (Italy) Francesca Schiavone [12]	6–0, 6–2
Men's doubles – semifinals	(United States) Bob Bryan [2] (United States) Mike Bryan [2]	(Czech Republic) Lukáš Dlouhý [4] (India) Leander Paes [4]	6–3, 6–3
Matches on Margaret Court Arena
Event	Winner	Loser	Score
Junior boys' singles – quarterfinals	(India) Yuki Bhambri [1]	(Germany) Richard Becker	6–1, 7–5
Junior girls' doubles – quarterfinals	(Australia) Isabella Holland (Australia) Sally Peers	(Romania) Elena Bogdan [1] (France) Kristina Mladenovic[1]	Walkover
Women's wheelchair doubles – semifinals	(Poland) Agnieszka Bartczak (Germany) Katharina Krüger	(France) Florence Gravellier [2] (Netherlands) Jiske Griffioen[2]	7–5, 3–6 [10–7]
Colored background means night matches

=== Day 12 (30 January) ===
In the second men's singles semifinals, top seeded Rafael Nadal took on his countrymen, 14th seed Fernando Verdasco, in the first ever all-Spanish semifinal in Australian Open. Nadal was the favourite to advance, only losing one set to his older opponent in 6 meetings and is yet to drop a set this year in Melbourne Park, however Verdasco had been on his peak form, upsetting favourites like Andy Murray and Jo-Wilfried Tsonga on his way to his maiden Grand Slam semifinal. With Roger Federer waiting in the final, both players carried their form into the match, holding on to their own serve as they entered a first set tiebreak, where Nadal had the initial advantage, but Verdasco's big serves comes to his rescue again and earned two set points after a lucky net cord, which he duly converted to take the first set. Nadal was heavily tested on his own serve in the second set while Verdasco powered to several love service games, but Nadal hung on and with some astonishing play, saved two game points in the 10th game and broke Verdasco, levelling things at one sets all. The momentum appeared to swing to Nadal's side as he broke Verdasco twice in the third set, only for Verdasco to break back immediately each time, bringing the third set into a tiebreaker which Nadal won handily. Verdasco's huge forehands and serve continued to pose a problem for Nadal, even though he had to call on a trainer at changeovers to tend to what appeared as a problem to his left calf. Another tiebreak was needed to settle the 4th set, and Verdasco sprinted away with a 7–1 victory, bringing the match to a decider. By then the match had already lasted more than 4 hours – but neither player showed signs of tiredness, even though Nadal appeared to be more at ease. Having come down from 0–30 down to lead 5–4 in the decider, Nadal gained 3 match points courtesy of only a 3rd double fault from Verdasco, and even though Verdasco managed to save two of them, a second double fault of the game – 4th overall – handed Nadal the match and a place in the finals. Nadal only managed to win one more point than Verdasco (193 to 192), who blasted 95 winners past Nadal, in a match that broke the Australian Open record as the longest men's singles match at 5 hours and 14 minutes (previous record by Boris Becker and Omar Camporese in 1991 at 5 hours and 11 minutes).

- Seeded player out: Fernando Verdasco

In an earlier match, the women's doubles final was played out between Daniela Hantuchová/Ai Sugiyama and Serena Williams/Venus Williams. Playing beneath the roof of the Rod Laver Arena as temperatures hit 43 degrees Celsius outdoors, the Slovak—Japanese pairing appeared to have the upper hand at first, breaking Venus to take the opening game. But it did not take the sisters too long to find their rhythm as Sugiyama was broken for 2–2. Sugiyama's serve was under pressure again by some heavy returns and the sisters break again, serving out the first set 6–3. All four players failed to hold serve at 1–1 in the second set, with Sugiyama's first to go, but eventually the Williamses get the decisive break to lead 4–3. Two games later, Hantuchová was left serving to stay in the match, but the sisters combined power proved too much, as they eased to a 6–3, 6–3 victory, for their 8th Grand Slam doubles title together, meaning they are now the joint 3rd most successful doubles pairings in the Open Era, together with Virginia Ruano Pascual and Paola Suárez, and behind Martina Navratilova/Pam Shriver (21) and Gigi Fernández/Natasha Zvereva (14).

Last year's mixed doubles finalist, India's Sania Mirza and Mahesh Bhupathi also earned the opportunity for another shot at the title, cruising past Iveta Benešová/Lukáš Dlouhý 6–1, 6–4 to advance to the finals against Nathalie Dechy and Andy Ram.

- Seeded players out: Daniela Hantuchová/Ai Sugiyama
- Schedule of Play

Matches on main courts
Matches on Rod Laver Arena
Event	Winner	Loser	Score
Women's doubles – Finals	(United States) Serena Williams [10] (United States) Venus Williams [10]	(Slovakia) Daniela Hantuchová [9] (Japan) Ai Sugiyama [9]	6–3, 6–3
Mixed doubles – Semifinals	(India) Sania Mirza (India) Mahesh Bhupathi	(Czech Republic) Iveta Benešová (Czech Republic) Lukáš Dlouhý	6–4, 6–1
Men's singles – Semifinals	(Spain) Rafael Nadal [1]	(Spain) Fernando Verdasco [14]	6–7(4), 6–4, 7–6(2), 6–7(1), 6–4
Matches on Margaret Court Arena
Event	Winner	Loser	Score
Junior Girls' singles – Semifinals	(United Kingdom) Laura Robson [5]	(Thailand) Noppawan Lertcheewakarn [1]	6–4, 6–3
Junior Boys' singles – Semifinals	(Germany) Alexandros Georgoudas	(Guatemala) Julen Urigüen [2]	6–4, 6–2
Colored background means night matches

=== Day 13 (31 January) ===
The women's singles final saw second seed Serena Williams clash against third seed Dinara Safina, with the winner ascending to the top spot in the WTA rankings, replacing Jelena Janković, in the post-tournament rankings. Safina was also aiming to be just the second Russian to ascend to the position with her maiden Grand Slam title, while it would be the 10th for Williams. Having won the women's doubles title a day earlier, Williams settled down quickly, comfortably holding serve and built up a 2–0 lead following multiple double faults from Safina. A hope for a Safina comeback was quickly extinguished as Williams looked sharp, blasting winners and heavy returns past her younger opponent, and sealed the first set 6–0 in just 22 minutes. Safina regrouped and proceeded to break Williams in the opening game of the second set, her first lead of any kind in the match, but the advantage was short-lived as Williams broke back immediately, and after easily holding to love, two more double faults and errors from Safina allowed her opponent to seal the decisive break. Safina could do nothing more than fighting to hold her own serves, forcing Williams to serve out, but another dominant service game saw Williams clinched her 4th Australian Open title after wins in 2003, 2005 and 2007. Safina admitted later during the prize giving ceremony that she felt like a ball boy on court against her opponent, promising to return the following year, while Williams will spend her 62nd non-consecutive week on top of the rankings next week.

- Seeded player out: Dinara Safina

Following the women's singles final, the men's doubles final took place in the Rod Laver Arena. Second seeds, American twins Bob and Mike Bryan overcame the third seeds Mahesh Bhupathi and Mark Knowles to take home their third Australian Open title together. Bhupathi and Knowles came out firing first, playing a near flawless first set to take the first set 6–2 after just 27 minutes, with a series of clever play that wrong-footed the twins on various occasions. They continued to pressure the 30-year-old Americans in the second set, forcing numerous break points but unable to convert each time, as the momentum shifted over and with Knowles' serve starting to falter, the Bryans were able to put away some smashes and volleys to take the second set 7–5. From there, they looked comfortable, steamrolling past the decider 6–0 to regain the title they last won in 2007, and dash Bhupathi's hope of winning two titles (he made it to the finals of the mixed doubles as well).

- Seeded players out: Mahesh Bhupathi/Mark Knowles
- Schedule of Play

Matches on main courts
Matches on Rod Laver Arena
Event	Winner	Loser	Score
Junior Girls' singles – Finals	(Russia) Ksenia Pervak [3]	(United Kingdom) Laura Robson [5]	6–3, 6–1
Junior Boys' singles – Finals	(India) Yuki Bhambri [1]	(Germany) Alexandros Georgoudas	6–3, 6–1
Women's singles – Finals	(United States) Serena Williams [2]	(Russia) Dinara Safina [3]	6–0, 6–3
Men's doubles – Finals	(United States) Bob Bryan [2] (United States) Mike Bryan [2]	(India) Mahesh Bhupathi [3] (The Bahamas) Mark Knowles [3]	2–6, 7–5, 6–0
Matches on Margaret Court Arena
Event	Winner	Loser	Score
Junior Girls' doubles – Finals	(United States) Christina McHale [6] (Croatia) Ajla Tomljanović [6]	(Serbia) Alexandra Krunić (Poland) Sandra Zaniewska	6–1, 2–6, [10–4]
Junior Boys' doubles – Finals	(Philippines) Francis Casey Alcantara [7] (Chinese Taipei) Hsieh Cheng-peng [7]	(Russia) Mikhail Biryukov (Japan) Yasutaka Uchiyama	6–4, 6–2
Colored background means night matches

=== Day 14 (1 February) ===
Nadal and Federer's first encounter for the year resulted in a five-set epic—lasting 4 hours and 23 minutes—with Nadal prevailing, 7–5, 3–6, 7–6(3), 3–6, 6–2 for his sixth Grand Slam title and his first on hard courts. Nadal is the first Spaniard in history to win the Australian Open and the fourth male tennis player – after Jimmy Connors, Mats Wilander and Andre Agassi — to win Grand Slam titles on three different surfaces. Later in 2009, Roger Federer would become the fifth player to accomplish this feat upon winning his 14th grand slam title at the 2009 French Open. Federer, who was pursuing a record-tying fourteenth Grand Slam title, was unable to hold back tears during the trophy presentation.

- Seeded players out: Roger Federer
- Schedule of Play

Matches on main courts
Matches on Rod Laver Arena
Event	Winner	Loser	Score
Mixed doubles – Finals	(India) Sania Mirza (India) Mahesh Bhupathi	(France) Nathalie Dechy (Israel) Andy Ram	6–3, 6–1
Men's singles – Finals	(Spain) Rafael Nadal [1]	(Switzerland) Roger Federer [2]	7–5, 3–6, 7–6(3), 3–6, 6–2
Colored background means night matches

== Champions ==
=== Seniors ===
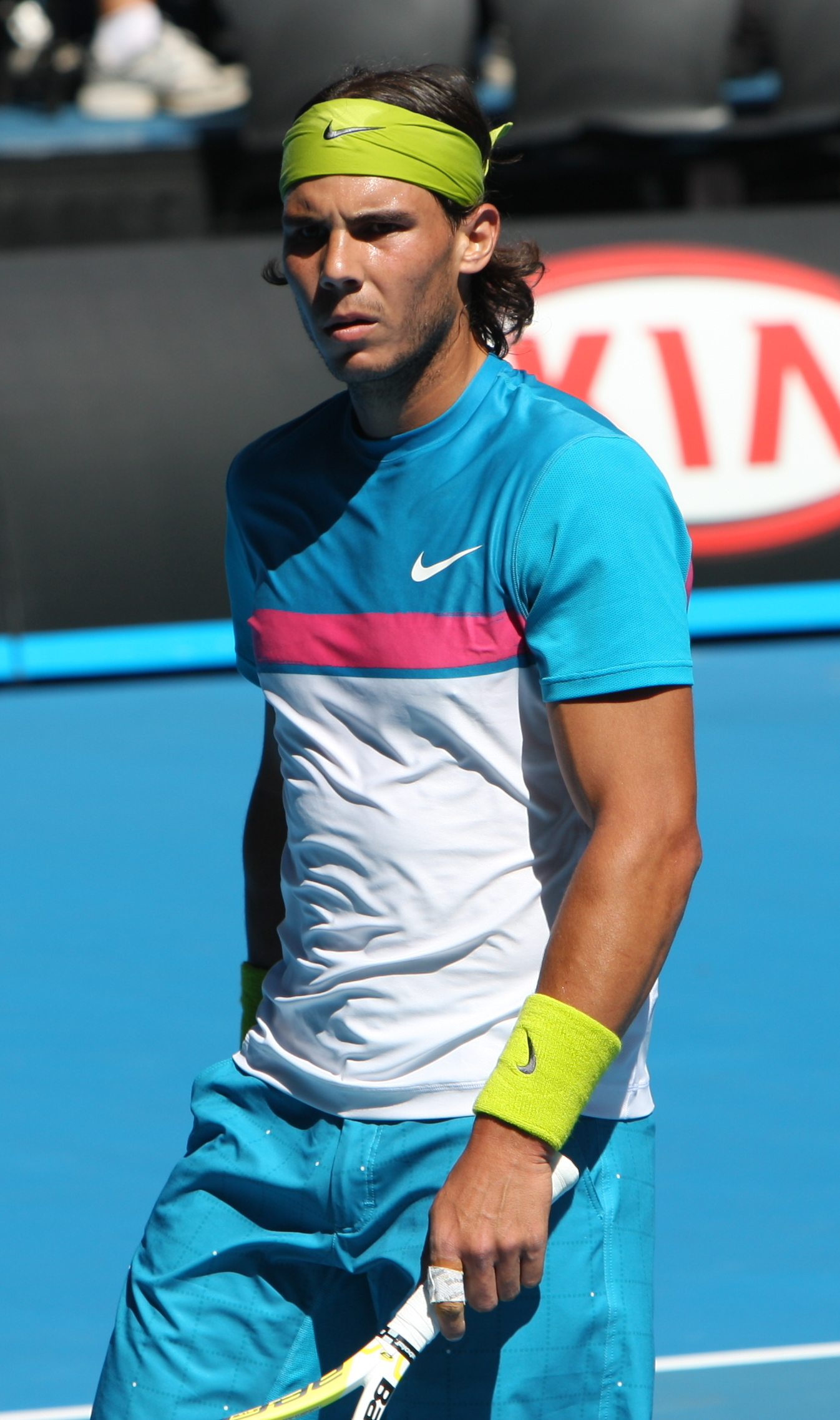
Rafael Nadal won his first Australian Open and sixth slam in his career.

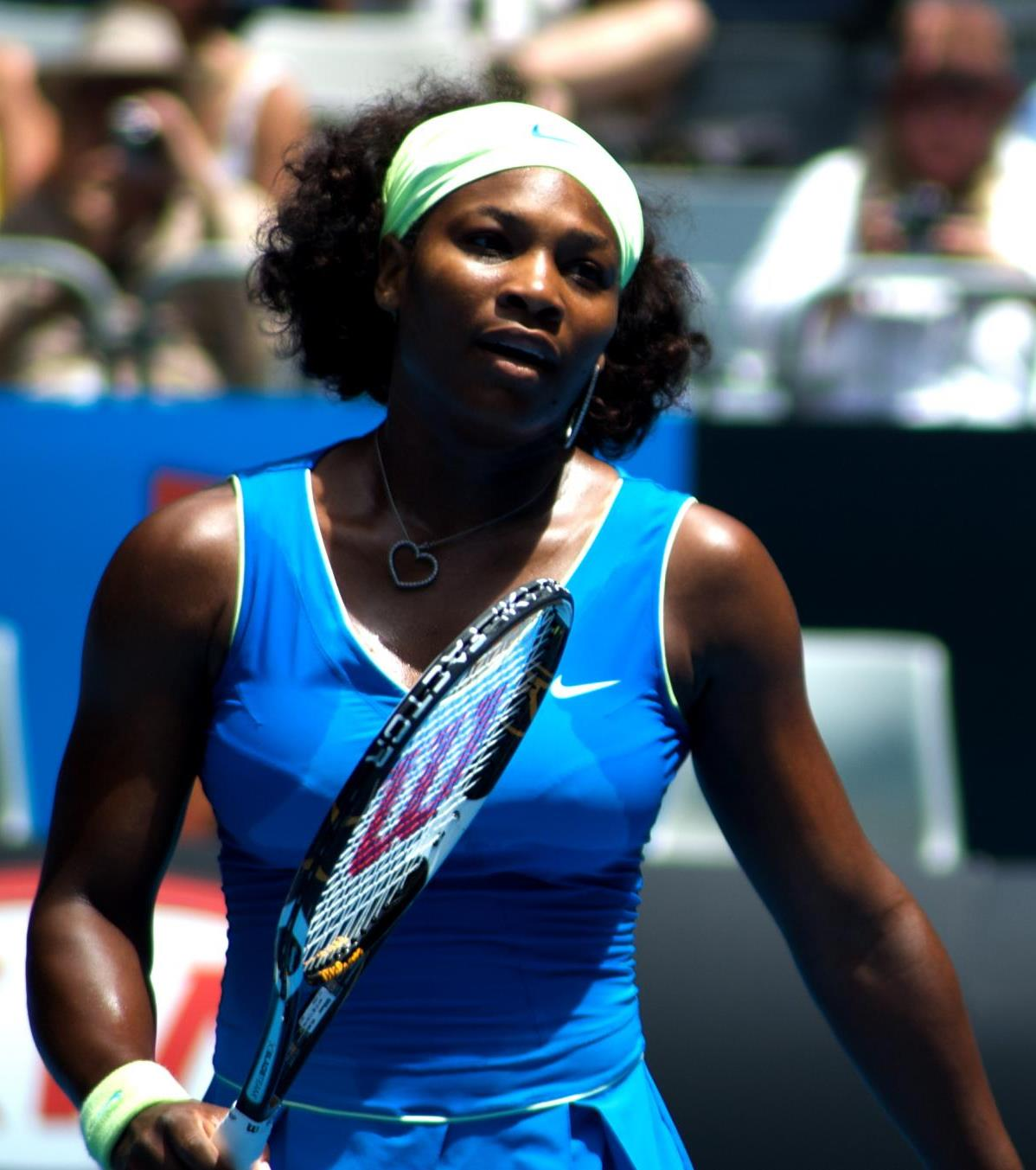
Serena Williams won the event for the fourth time, to tie the all-time open era record.

==== Men's singles ====
(Spain) Rafael Nadal defeated (Switzerland) Roger Federer, 7–5, 3–6, 7–6^{(7–3)}, 3–6, 6–2

- It was Nadal's 1st title of the year, and his 32nd overall. It was his 6th Grand Slam title, and his 1st at the Australian Open.

==== Women's singles ====
(United States) Serena Williams defeated (Russia) Dinara Safina, 6–0, 6–3

- It was Serena's 1st title of the year, and her 33rd overall. It was her 10th Grand Slam title, and her 4th at the Australian Open.

==== Men's doubles ====
(United States) Bob Bryan / (United States) Mike Bryan defeated (India) Mahesh Bhupathi / (The Bahamas) Mark Knowles, 2–6, 7–5, 6–0

==== Women's doubles ====
(United States) Serena Williams / (United States) Venus Williams defeated (Slovakia) Daniela Hantuchová / (Japan) Ai Sugiyama, 6–3, 6–3

==== Mixed doubles ====
(India) Sania Mirza / (India) Mahesh Bhupathi defeated (France) Nathalie Dechy / (Israel) Andy Ram, 6–3, 6–1

=== Juniors ===
==== Boys' singles ====
(India) Yuki Bhambri defeated (Germany) Alexandros Georgoudas, 6–3, 6–1

==== Girls' singles ====
(Russia) Ksenia Pervak defeated (United Kingdom) Laura Robson 6–3, 6–1

==== Boys' doubles ====
(Philippines) Francis Casey Alcantara / (Chinese Taipei) Hsieh Cheng-peng defeated (Russia) Mikhail Biryukov / (Japan) Yasutaka Uchiyama, 6–4, 6–2

==== Girls' doubles ====
(United States) Christina McHale / (Croatia) Ajla Tomljanović defeated (Serbia) Aleksandra Krunić / (Poland) Sandra Zaniewska, 6–1, 2–6, [10–4]

=== Wheelchair events ===
==== Wheelchair men's singles ====
(Japan) Shingo Kunieda defeated (France) Stéphane Houdet, 6–2, 6–4

==== Wheelchair women's singles ====
(Netherlands) Esther Vergeer defeated (Netherlands) Korie Homan, 6–4, 6–2

==== Wheelchair quad singles ====
(United Kingdom) Peter Norfolk defeated (United States) David Wagner, 7–6^{(7–5)}, 6–1

==== Wheelchair men's doubles ====
(Netherlands) Robin Ammerlaan / (Japan) Shingo Kunieda defeated (Sweden) Stefan Olsson / (Netherlands) Maikel Scheffers, 7–5, 6–1

==== Wheelchair women's doubles ====
(Netherlands) Korie Homan / (Netherlands) Esther Vergeer defeated (Poland) Agnieszka Bartczak / (Germany) Katharina Krüger, 6–1, 6–0

==== Wheelchair quad doubles ====
(United States) Nick Taylor / (United States) David Wagner defeated (Sweden) Johan Andersson / (United Kingdom) Peter Norfolk, 6–2, 6–3

== Singles seeds ==
Withdrawals: Lindsay Davenport, Katarina Srebotnik, Nikolay Davydenko, Maria Sharapova, Li Na, Nicolas Kiefer

=== Men's singles ===
1. (Spain) Rafael Nadal (champion)
2. (Switzerland) Roger Federer (finals, lost to Rafael Nadal)
3. (Serbia) Novak Djokovic (quarterfinals, retired against Andy Roddick)
4. (United Kingdom) Andy Murray (fourth round, lost to Fernando Verdasco)
5. (France) Jo-Wilfried Tsonga (quarterfinals, lost to Fernando Verdasco)
6. (France) Gilles Simon (quarterfinals, lost to Rafael Nadal)
7. (United States) Andy Roddick (semifinals, lost to Roger Federer)
8. (Argentina) Juan Martín del Potro (quarterfinals, lost to Roger Federer)
9. (United States) James Blake (fourth round, lost to Jo-Wilfried Tsonga)
10. (Argentina) David Nalbandian (second round, lost to Lu Yen-hsun)
11. (Spain) David Ferrer (third round, lost to Marin Čilić)
12. (France) Gaël Monfils (fourth round, retired against Gilles Simon)
13. (Chile) Fernando González (fourth round, lost to Rafael Nadal)
14. (Spain) Fernando Verdasco (semifinals, lost to Rafael Nadal)
15. (Switzerland) Stanislas Wawrinka (third round, lost to Tomáš Berdych)
16. (Sweden) Robin Söderling (second round, lost to Marcos Baghdatis)
17. (Spain) Nicolás Almagro (third round, lost to Gaël Monfils)
18. (Russia) Igor Andreev (third round, lost to James Blake)
19. (Croatia) Marin Čilić (fourth round, lost to Juan Martín del Potro)
20. (Czech Republic) Tomáš Berdych (fourth round, lost to Roger Federer)
21. (Spain) Tommy Robredo (fourth round, lost to Andy Roddick)
22. (Czech Republic) Radek Štěpánek (third round, lost to Fernando Verdasco)
23. (United States) Mardy Fish (third round, lost to Marcos Baghdatis)
24. (France) Richard Gasquet (third round, lost to Fernando González)
25. (Croatia) Ivo Karlović (second round, lost to Mario Ančić)
26. (Russia) Marat Safin (third round, lost to Roger Federer)
27. (Spain) Feliciano López (first round, lost to Gilles Müller)
28. (France) Paul-Henri Mathieu (second round, lost to Amer Delić)
29. (Russia) Dmitry Tursunov (first round, lost to Flavio Cipolla)
30. (Germany) Rainer Schüttler (first round, lost to Dudi Sela)
31. (Austria) Jürgen Melzer (third round, lost to Andy Murray)
32. (Germany) Philipp Kohlschreiber (second round, lost to Fabrice Santoro)

=== Women's singles ===
1. (Serbia) Jelena Janković (fourth round, lost to Marion Bartoli)
2. (United States) Serena Williams (champion)
3. (Russia) Dinara Safina (finals, lost to Serena Williams)
4. (Russia) Elena Dementieva (semifinals, lost to Serena Williams)
5. (Serbia) Ana Ivanovic (third round, lost to Alisa Kleybanova)
6. (United States) Venus Williams (second round, lost to Carla Suárez Navarro)
7. (Russia) Vera Zvonareva (semifinals, lost to Dinara Safina)
8. (Russia) Svetlana Kuznetsova (quarterfinals, lost to Serena Williams)
9. (Poland) Agnieszka Radwańska (first round, lost to Kateryna Bondarenko)
10. (Russia) Nadia Petrova (fourth round, lost to Vera Zvonareva)
11. (Denmark) Caroline Wozniacki (third round, lost to Jelena Dokić)
12. (Italy) Flavia Pennetta (third round, lost to Anabel Medina Garrigues)
13. (Belarus) Victoria Azarenka (fourth round, retired against Serena Williams)
14. (Switzerland) Patty Schnyder (second round, lost to Virginie Razzano)
15. (France) Alizé Cornet (fourth round, lost to Dinara Safina)
16. (France) Marion Bartoli (quarterfinals, lost to Vera Zvonareva)
17. (Russia) Anna Chakvetadze (second round, lost to Jelena Dokić)
18. (Slovakia) Dominika Cibulková (fourth round, lost to Elena Dementieva)
19. (Slovakia) Daniela Hantuchová (third round, lost to Alizé Cornet)
20. (France) Amélie Mauresmo (third round, lost to Victoria Azarenka)
21. (Spain) Anabel Medina Garrigues (fourth round, lost to Carla Suárez Navarro)
22. (China) Zheng Jie (fourth round, retired against Svetlana Kuznetsova)
23. (Hungary) Ágnes Szávay (first round, lost to Galina Voskoboeva)
24. (Austria) Sybille Bammer (first round, lost to Lucie Šafářová)
25. (Estonia) Kaia Kanepi (third round, lost to Dinara Safina)
26. (Japan) Ai Sugiyama (third round, lost to Jelena Janković)
27. (Russia) Maria Kirilenko (first round, lost to Sara Errani)
28. (Italy) Francesca Schiavone (first round, lost to Peng Shuai)
29. (Russia) Alisa Kleybanova (fourth round, lost to Jelena Dokić)
30. (Canada) Aleksandra Wozniak (first round, lost to Sabine Lisicki)
31. (Ukraine) Alona Bondarenko (third round, lost to Svetlana Kuznetsova)
32. (Thailand) Tamarine Tanasugarn (first round, lost to María José Martínez Sánchez)

== Wildcard entries ==
=== Men's singles wildcard entries ===
1. (Uzbekistan) Denis Istomin
2. (Australia) Colin Ebelthite
3. (Australia) Carsten Ball
4. (France) Adrian Mannarino
5. (Australia) Samuel Groth
6. (Australia) Bernard Tomic
7. (United States) John Isner
8. (Australia) Brydan Klein

=== Women's singles wildcard entries ===
1. (Australia) Monika Wejnert
2. (Australia) Jelena Dokić
3. (Australia) Isabella Holland
4. (United States) Christina McHale
5. (Australia) Olivia Rogowska
6. (China) Yuan Meng
7. (France) Kristina Mladenovic
8. (Australia) Jessica Moore

== Qualifier entries ==
=== Men's qualifiers entries ===
1. (Italy) Flavio Cipolla
2. (Germany) Andreas Beck
3. (Israel) Dudi Sela
4. (Germany) Björn Phau
5. (Germany) Dieter Kindlmann
6. (Algeria) Lamine Ouahab
7. (Sweden) Björn Rehnquist
8. (United States) Wayne Odesnik
9. (France) Sébastien de Chaunac
10. (Russia) Evgeny Korolev
11. (Slovakia) Dominik Hrbatý
12. (Germany) Florian Mayer
13. (Canada) Peter Polansky
14. (Belgium) Xavier Malisse
15. (Germany) Michael Berrer
16. (Italy) Andrea Stoppini

==== Lucky losers ====
1. (United States) Amer Delić
2. (Canada) Frank Dancevic

=== Women's qualifiers entries ===
1. (United Kingdom) Elena Baltacha
2. (Ukraine) Viktoriya Kutuzova
3. (United Kingdom) Katie O'Brien
4. (United States) Melanie Oudin
5. (Japan) Kimiko Date-Krumm
6. (Bulgaria) Sesil Karatantcheva
7. (Croatia) Karolina Šprem
8. (Germany) Julia Schruff
9. (Germany) Kathrin Wörle
10. (Italy) Alberta Brianti
11. (Canada) Stéphanie Dubois
12. (South Africa) Chanelle Scheepers

== Withdrawals ==
Men's Singles

- (Argentina) José Acasuso → replaced by (Argentina) Brian Dabul
- (Argentina) Juan Ignacio Chela → replaced by (South Africa) Kevin Anderson
- (Russia) Nikolay Davydenko → replaced by (Spain) Pablo Andújar
- (Germany) Nicolas Kiefer → replaced by (Canada) Frank Dancevic
- (France) Nicolas Mahut → replaced by (United States) Amer Delić

Women's Singles

- (Switzerland) Timea Bacsinszky → replaced by (Russia) Ekaterina Bychkova
- (United States) Lindsay Davenport → replaced by (France) Stéphanie Cohen-Aloro
- (China) Li Na → replaced by (Germany) Julia Görges
- (United States) Bethanie Mattek-Sands → replaced by (Hungary) Melinda Czink
- (France) Pauline Parmentier → replaced by (Austria) Patricia Mayr
- (Ukraine) Tatiana Perebiynis → replaced by (Spain) Virginia Ruano Pascual
- (Russia) Maria Sharapova → replaced by (United Kingdom) Melanie South
- (United States) Meghann Shaughnessy → replaced by (Belgium) Kirsten Flipkens
- (Slovenia) Katarina Srebotnik → replaced by (Colombia) Mariana Duque Mariño

Preceded by 2008 US Open	Grand Slam events	Succeeded by 2009 French Open
