= Australian Open extreme heat policy =

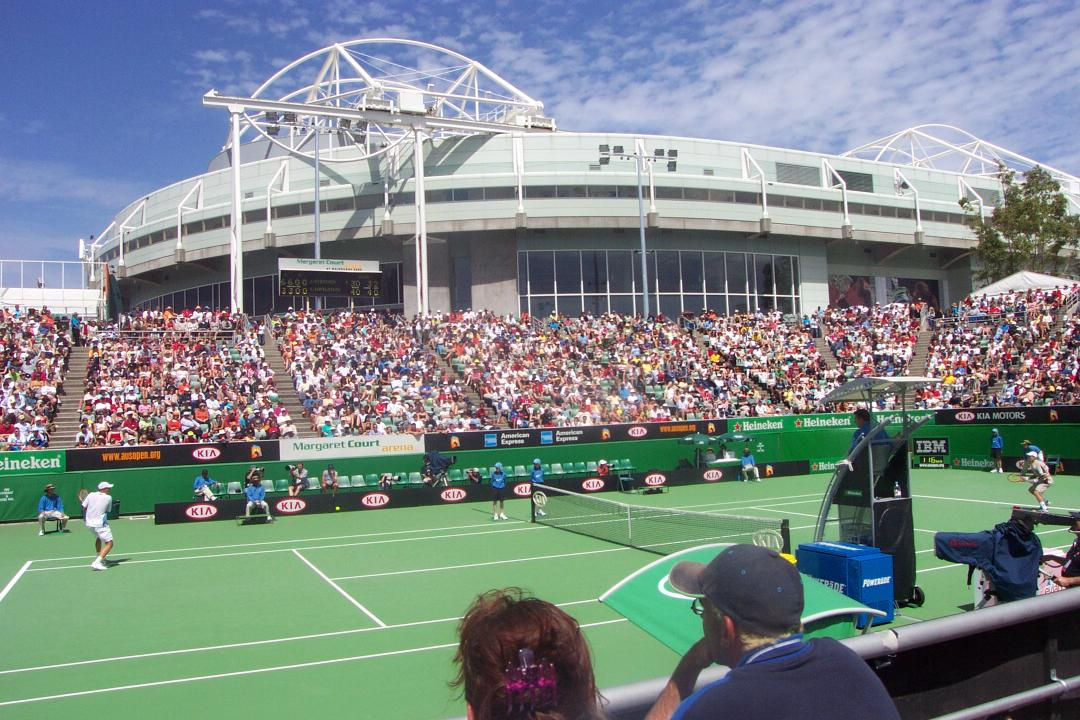
Margaret Court Arena in 2005 at the Australian Open before its renovation and change of court surface. Rod Laver Arena, the centre court, in the background.

The Extreme Heat Policy is a rule pertaining to the Australian Open (tennis). It was introduced in 1998 after consultation with a number of tennis players. Its current iteration was first implemented in 2019 and uses a scale of 1 to 5 that accounts for the physiological variances between adults, wheelchair and junior athletes while also taking into account the four climate factors–air temperature, radiant heat or the strength of the sun, humidity and wind speed–which affect a player’s ability to disperse heat from their body.

== Changes for 2015 ==
Following severe criticism of the handling of the 2014 Australian Open, organisers increased the temperature threshold from the 2003 level of 35 to 40 °C (95 to 104 °F) and increased the wet-bulb globe temperature (WBGT) threshold from the 2003 level of 28 to 32.5 °C (82 to 91 °F) to allow for more continuous play and fewer stoppages in the future.

WBGT charts show that the new threshold may not be triggered even if the temperature reaches 50 °C (122 °F) when there is no humidity.

When the policy is implemented, matches will now be halted after an even number of games in the set, rather than at the conclusion of the set.

There will also be a retractable roof available on Margaret Court Arena for the first time.

== History ==
In 1988, Rod Laver Arena opened making the Australian Open the first Grand Slam to feature a retractable roof. The initial heat policy allowed for the roof to be closed when the temperature rose above 39 °C (102 °F) or at the referee's discretion when the temperature rose above 35 °C (95 °F), but only for daytime matches and only once all singles matches could be scheduled inside Rod Laver Arena. This effectively meant that the heat policy could only go in effect in the quarterfinals or later in the tournament.

Officials considered closing the roof for the final in 1993 due to a temperature of 40 °C (104 °F), but Jim Courier threatened to boycott the match unless the roof remained open.

The heat rule was first invoked during the quarterfinal round in 1997.

In 1998, a new policy was implemented calling for play on all courts to be stopped if the temperature reached 40 °C (104 °F). This was later changed in 2002 to 38 °C (100 °F).

The 2002 women's final was played in 35 °C (95 °F) heat, which triggered a 10-minute break between the 2nd and 3rd sets but no halt in play.

Beginning with the 2003 tournament the policy was changed to 35 °C (95 °F) and a WBGT of 28 °C (82 °F).

The new policy was invoked on January 20, 2003 on a day when the temperature reached 37 °C (99 °F) and the WBGT reached the 28 °C (82 °F) mark. Play was halted for the minimum 2 hours.

After the extreme heat policy was invoked in consecutive years in 2006 and 2007, the policy was again changed starting in 2008 to allow matches in progress to be halted at the conclusion of the set. Prior to that a match already underway had to be completed. The policy was further changed in 2008 to allow play to be stopped only at the discretion of the tournament referee, rather than relying solely on temperature and WBGT calculations.

The policy was invoked several times in 2009, the hottest tournament to date with an average temperature of 34.7 °C (94.5 °F).

The policy was invoked on day 2 of the 2023 tournament was temperatures reached 98 degrees Fahrenheit with a feel of 101 degrees Fahrenheit. Play was suspended on all courts that did not have a roof.

== Criticism ==
=== 2014 ===
The extreme heat policy came under criticism during the 2014 Australian Open after ballboys, attendants in the stands, and players were suffering various heat-related illnesses due to four consecutive days with highs between 41.5 and 43.9 °C (106.7 and 111.0 °F), but organizers claimed the humidity remained low enough on all but one day for the policy not to be enforced; tournament referee Wayne McKewen said that "While conditions were hot and uncomfortable, the relatively low level of humidity ensured that conditions never deteriorated to a point where it was necessary to invoke the extreme heat policy". Frank Dancevic, who began to hallucinate and collapse during his 6–7^{(12–14)}, 3–6, 4–6 loss to Benoît Paire, described the conditions as "inhumane" while severely criticising the policy, and Andy Murray voiced his concerns about people's safety, stating that "it only takes one bad thing to happen". Ivan Dodig, who also collapsed and was forced to retire, said afterwards that he feared he might die in the extreme conditions. Nine players retired during the second day, while Daniel Gimeno-Traver carried off a ball boy who fainted during his match and Peng Shuai was amongst many throughout the tournament that required medical attention. Jo-Wilfried Tsonga and Caroline Wozniacki noted that their shoes and water bottles were beginning to melt in the conditions, while Serena Williams and Victoria Azarenka said that the heat was affecting their play.

Roger Federer, however, agreed with the referee's decision, saying that adequate training and preparation should be enough to cope with the weather. Gilles Simon, who was injured prior to the tournament, took a similar view and said that the heat improved his game.

On the second day of the tournament the temperature reached 42.2 °C (108.0 °F). On the third day it reached 41.5 °C (106.7 °F). On the fourth day it reached 43.3 °C (109.9 °F). On the fifth day it reached 43.9 °C (111.0 °F) with 6% humidity. Play continued uninterrupted for the second, third, and fifth days and was stopped for 4 hours on the fourth day. For many players the stoppage was closer to 3 hours because they had to complete the set in progress even after the policy went into effect. On Rod Laver Arena, Maria Sharapova and Karin Knapp had to complete a 3rd set that lasted nearly 2 hours and 18 games. On the third day 970 fans had been treated for heat exhaustion.

While the exact WBGT on these days has not been revealed by the organizers, it is clear that had the earlier 1998 policy been still in effect play would have been halted all 4 days once the temperature exceeded 40 degrees Celsius.

The extreme heat resulted in a record number of 9 withdraws in the first round.

=== Spectator lawsuit ===
On January 24, 2015, the Herald Sun reported that Susan Carman sued the Melbourne & Olympic Parks Trust for failing to close the roof at Hisense Arena during Andy Murray's second round match in the 2013 Australian Open. The temperature that day reached 40 °C (104 °F). Carman says she fell down the stairs while seeking shade.

== See also ==
- Australian Open
- Climate change in Australia
