= 2009 Australian Open – Men's singles qualifying =

Men's singles qualifying
- 2009 Australian Open

Events
Singles	men	women		boys	girls
Doubles	men	women	mixed	boys	girls
WC Singles	men	women	quad
WC Doubles	men	women	quad
Legends	men	women	mixed

Qualification
Singles	men	women
- Australian Open

== Seeds ==
1. (Chile) Paul Capdeville (first round)
2. (Germany) Andreas Beck (qualified)
3. (Israel) Dudi Sela (qualified)
4. (Germany) Björn Phau (qualified)
5. (Japan) Go Soeda (first round)
6. (United States) Kevin Kim (first round)
7. (South Korea) Lee Hyung-taik (first round)
8. (United States) Wayne Odesnik (qualified)
9. (Spain) Santiago Ventura (qualifying competition)
10. (Russia) Evgeny Korolev (qualified)
11. (Germany) Simon Greul (first round)
12. (United States) Amer Delić (qualifying competition, lucky loser)
13. (Romania) Victor Crivoi (first round)
14. (Canada) Frank Dancevic (qualifying competition, lucky loser)
15. (Germany) Michael Berrer (qualified)
16. (Switzerland) Stéphane Bohli (first round)
17. (Serbia) Ilija Bozoljac (first round)
18. (Italy) Flavio Cipolla (qualified)
19. (Slovakia) Karol Beck (second round)
20. (France) Olivier Patience (qualifying competition)
21. (Austria) Alexander Peya (first round)
22. (France) Mathieu Montcourt (second round)
23. (Germany) Simon Stadler (qualifying competition)
24. (Kazakhstan) Mikhail Kukushkin (first round)
25. (Russia) Mikhail Elgin (second round)
26. (Germany) Daniel Brands (second round)
27. (Thailand) Danai Udomchoke (qualifying competition)
28. (India) Somdev Devvarman (second round)
29. (United States) Brendan Evans (first round)
30. (Spain) Pere Riba (first round)
31. (Australia) Peter Luczak (qualifying competition)
32. (South Africa) Rik de Voest (second round)

== Qualifiers ==
1. (Italy) Flavio Cipolla
2. (Germany) Andreas Beck
3. (Israel) Dudi Sela
4. (Germany) Björn Phau
5. (Germany) Dieter Kindlmann
6. (Algeria) Lamine Ouahab
7. (Sweden) Björn Rehnquist
8. (United States) Wayne Odesnik
9. (France) Sébastien de Chaunac
10. (Russia) Evgeny Korolev
11. (Slovakia) Dominik Hrbatý
12. (Germany) Florian Mayer
13. (Canada) Peter Polansky
14. (Belgium) Xavier Malisse
15. (Germany) Michael Berrer
16. (Italy) Andrea Stoppini

== Lucky losers ==
1. (United States) Amer Delić
2. (Canada) Frank Dancevic

== Qualifying draw ==
Key

- Q = Qualifier
- WC = Wild card
- LL = Lucky loser
- Alt = Alternate
- ITF = ITF entry
- PR = Protected ranking
- SR = Special ranking
- SE = Special exempt
- JE = Junior exempt
- JR = Junior Accelerator Programme entrant
- CO = College Accelerator Programme entrant
- NG = Next Gen Accelerator Program entrant
- w/o = Walkover
- r = Retired
- d = Defaulted

=== First qualifier ===
First round
1	(Chile) Paul Capdeville	3	6	4
(Netherlands) Matwé Middelkoop	6	2	6
(United Kingdom) Alexander Slabinsky	4	0
(Russia) Alexander Kudryavtsev	6	6
(Republic of Ireland) Conor Niland	1	3
(France) Éric Prodon	6	6
(Poland) Dawid Olejniczak	0	1
18	(Italy) Flavio Cipolla	6	6

Second round
(Netherlands) Matwé Middelkoop	3	6	2
(Russia) Alexander Kudryavtsev	6	2	6
(France) Éric Prodon	0	4
18	(Italy) Flavio Cipolla	6	6

Qualifying competition
(Russia) Alexander Kudryavtsev	3	3
18	(Italy) Flavio Cipolla	6	6

=== Second qualifier ===
First round
2	(Germany) Andreas Beck	6	6
WC	(Australia) Brendan McKenzie	1	2
(Austria) Martin Fischer	6	3	4
(South Korea) Im Kyu-tae	4	6	6
(France) Édouard Roger-Vasselin	6	3	1
(Poland) Łukasz Kubot	3	6	6
(India) Prakash Amritraj	4	6	4
28	(India) Somdev Devvarman	6	3	6

Second round
2	(Germany) Andreas Beck	3	7^{7}	6
(South Korea) Im Kyu-tae	6	6^{3}	3
(Poland) Łukasz Kubot	4	6	7
28	(India) Somdev Devvarman	6	4	5

Qualifying competition
2	(Germany) Andreas Beck	6	6
(Poland) Łukasz Kubot	4	3

=== Third qualifier ===
First round
3	(Israel) Dudi Sela	6	6
(Czech Republic) Jaroslav Pospíšil	3	0
(Australia) Marinko Matosevic	5	6^{6}
(Ecuador) Giovanni Lapentti	7	7^{8}
WC	(Australia) John Millman	4	6	6
(Ukraine) Illya Marchenko	6	0	4
(Slovenia) Grega Žemlja	6	6
29	(United States) Brendan Evans	3	1

Second round
3	(Israel) Dudi Sela	6	6
(Ecuador) Giovanni Lapentti	3	4
WC	(Australia) John Millman	3	4
(Slovenia) Grega Žemlja	6	6

Qualifying competition
3	(Israel) Dudi Sela	6	2	8
(Slovenia) Grega Žemlja	0	6	6

=== Fourth qualifier ===
First round
4	(Germany) Björn Phau	6	6
(Australia) Robert Smeets	3	3
(Italy) Marco Crugnola	6	6
(Romania) Victor Ioniță	1	3
(Germany) Alexander Satschko	6	6
WC	(Australia) Matt Reid	4	4
(Germany) Matthias Bachinger	5	6	6
30	(Spain) Pere Riba	7	3	4

Second round
4	(Germany) Björn Phau	7	6
(Italy) Marco Crugnola	5	2
(Germany) Alexander Satschko	3	2
(Germany) Matthias Bachinger	6	6

Qualifying competition
4	(Germany) Björn Phau	4	7^{7}	6
(Germany) Matthias Bachinger	6	6^{2}	1

=== Fifth qualifier ===
First round
5	(Japan) Go Soeda	6	3	6
(Australia) Joseph Sirianni	3	6	8
(Italy) Gianluca Naso	7	6
(United Kingdom) James Ward	5	4
(Germany) Dieter Kindlmann	6	6
(Australia) Nick Lindahl	2	1
(France) Laurent Recouderc	6	4	10
26	(Germany) Daniel Brands	4	6	12

Second round
(Australia) Joseph Sirianni	4	6	2
(Italy) Gianluca Naso	6	4	6
(Germany) Dieter Kindlmann	6	6^{5}	6
26	(Germany) Daniel Brands	2	7^{7}	3

Qualifying competition
(Italy) Gianluca Naso	1	6	2
(Germany) Dieter Kindlmann	6	4	6

=== Sixth qualifier ===
First round
6	(United States) Kevin Kim	6^{5}	6	3
(France) Josselin Ouanna	7^{7}	2	6
(Kazakhstan) Yuri Schukin	6	3	2
(United States) Ryan Sweeting	4	6	6
(France) David Guez	3	6	3
(Algeria) Lamine Ouahab	6	4	6
(Spain) Miguel Ángel López Jaén	7^{8}	2	6
22	(France) Mathieu Montcourt	6^{6}	6	8

Second round
(France) Josselin Ouanna	2	7	4
(United States) Ryan Sweeting	6	5	6
(Algeria) Lamine Ouahab	4	7^{7}	9
22	(France) Mathieu Montcourt	6	6^{1}	7

Qualifying competition
(United States) Ryan Sweeting	4	6	6
(Algeria) Lamine Ouahab	6	3	8

=== Seventh qualifier ===
First round
7	(South Korea) Lee Hyung-taik	4	6	3
(Spain) Marc López	6	1	6
(Belgium) Niels Desein	6	7^{8}
(Serbia) Dušan Vemić	1	6^{6}
(Sweden) Björn Rehnquist	6	6
(Italy) Paolo Lorenzi	1	4
(Switzerland) George Bastl	3	6^{0}
32	(South Africa) Rik de Voest	6	7^{7}

Second round
(Spain) Marc López	6	6
(Belgium) Niels Desein	3	2
(Sweden) Björn Rehnquist	6	2	6
32	(South Africa) Rik de Voest	4	6	4

Qualifying competition
(Spain) Marc López	1	7^{7}	6
(Sweden) Björn Rehnquist	6	6^{3}	8

=== Eighth qualifier ===
First round
8	(United States) Wayne Odesnik	6	6
(Mexico) Santiago González	0	2
(Argentina) Diego Álvarez	1	2
(Monaco) Jean-René Lisnard	6	6
(France) Thierry Ascione	6^{1}	6	6
WC	(Australia) Greg Jones	7^{7}	4	3
WC	(Australia) Andrew Coelho	3	6	3
31	(Australia) Peter Luczak	6	4	6

Second round
8	(United States) Wayne Odesnik	7	6
(Monaco) Jean-René Lisnard	5	2
(France) Thierry Ascione	6	2	4
31	(Australia) Peter Luczak	4	6	6

Qualifying competition
8	(United States) Wayne Odesnik	1	6	6
31	(Australia) Peter Luczak	6	2	3

=== Ninth qualifier ===
First round
9	(Spain) Santiago Ventura	7	6
(Netherlands) Jesse Huta Galung	5	3
(Ukraine) Oleksandr Dolgopolov Jr.	6	6
(Turkey) Marsel İlhan	3	3
(France) Sébastien de Chaunac	6	6
(France) Gary Lugassy	3	4
(United Kingdom) Alex Bogdanovic	6	4	6
24	(Kazakhstan) Mikhail Kukushkin	2	6	4

Second round
9	(Spain) Santiago Ventura	2	7^{7}	6
(Ukraine) Oleksandr Dolgopolov Jr.	6	6^{1}	3
(France) Sébastien de Chaunac	6	6
(United Kingdom) Alex Bogdanovic	3	2

Qualifying competition
9	(Spain) Santiago Ventura	4	1
(France) Sébastien de Chaunac	6	6

=== Tenth qualifier ===
First round
10	(Russia) Evgeny Korolev	6	6
(Denmark) Frederik Nielsen	4	1
(France) Alexandre Sidorenko	6	6
WC	(Australia) Andrew Thomas	1	2
(Slovakia) Pavol Červenák	7^{7}	3	6
(United Kingdom) Josh Goodall	6^{5}	6	4
(Serbia) Boris Pašanski	1	3
27	(Thailand) Danai Udomchoke	6	6

Second round
10	(Russia) Evgeny Korolev	3	6	6
(France) Alexandre Sidorenko	6	4	0
(Slovakia) Pavol Červenák	6	2	1
27	(Thailand) Danai Udomchoke	3	6	6

Qualifying competition
10	(Russia) Evgeny Korolev	6	7
27	(Thailand) Danai Udomchoke	3	5

=== Eleventh qualifier ===
First round
11	(Germany) Simon Greul	6	4	4
(Italy) Riccardo Ghedin	2	6	6
(Slovakia) Dominik Hrbatý	6	6
(United States) Michael Yani	1	4
PR	(Switzerland) Marco Chiudinelli	6	6
(United States) Scoville Jenkins	3	1
(Slovenia) Luka Gregorc	4	1
19	(Slovakia) Karol Beck	6	6

Second round
(Italy) Riccardo Ghedin	4	1
(Slovakia) Dominik Hrbatý	6	6
PR	(Switzerland) Marco Chiudinelli	6	7^{8}
19	(Slovakia) Karol Beck	2	6^{6}

Qualifying competition
(Slovakia) Dominik Hrbatý	6	6
PR	(Switzerland) Marco Chiudinelli	1	3

=== Twelfth qualifier ===
First round
12	(United States) Amer Delić	7^{8}	6
(Italy) Matteo Marrai	6^{6}	2
(Czech Republic) Lukáš Dlouhý	6	6
PR	(United States) Zack Fleishman	3	0
(Ukraine) Sergei Bubka	0	3
PR	(Germany) Florian Mayer	6	6
(Slovenia) Blaž Kavčič	6	6
17	(Serbia) Ilija Bozoljac	1	3

Second round
12	(United States) Amer Delić	6	7
(Czech Republic) Lukáš Dlouhý	3	5
PR	(Germany) Florian Mayer	7^{8}	6
(Slovenia) Blaž Kavčič	6^{6}	0

Qualifying competition
12	(United States) Amer Delić	0	7^{7}	0
PR	(Germany) Florian Mayer	6	6^{3}	6

=== Thirteenth qualifier ===
First round
13	(Romania) Victor Crivoi	6	6^{3}	3
(Republic of Ireland) Louk Sorensen	4	7^{7}	6
(Austria) Rainer Eitzinger	1	6^{4}
(Canada) Peter Polansky	6	7^{7}
(Japan) Tatsuma Ito	2	6^{2}
(Spain) Carles Poch-Gradin	6	7^{7}
PR	(Poland) Michał Przysiężny	3	4
20	(France) Olivier Patience	6	6

Second round
(Republic of Ireland) Louk Sorensen	6	1	3
(Canada) Peter Polansky	4	6	6
(Spain) Carles Poch-Gradin	7^{8}	4	4
20	(France) Olivier Patience	6^{6}	6	6

Qualifying competition
(Canada) Peter Polansky	2	6	6
20	(France) Olivier Patience	6	4	2

=== Fourteenth qualifier ===
First round
14	(Canada) Frank Dancevic	6	6
(Netherlands) Michel Koning	3	3
WC	(Australia) Dane Propoggia	6^{4}	3
(Italy) Simone Vagnozzi	7^{7}	6
(Belgium) Xavier Malisse	7^{7}	7^{7}
(United States) Rajeev Ram	6^{3}	6^{4}
(Switzerland) Michael Lammer	6	6
21	(Austria) Alexander Peya	3	2

Second round
14	(Canada) Frank Dancevic	6	6
(Italy) Simone Vagnozzi	1	4
(Belgium) Xavier Malisse	6	6
(Switzerland) Michael Lammer	2	2

Qualifying competition
14	(Canada) Frank Dancevic	6	5	1
(Belgium) Xavier Malisse	3	7	6

=== Fifteenth qualifier ===
First round
15	(Germany) Michael Berrer	3	6	6
(Germany) Tobias Kamke	6	4	4
WC	(Australia) Matthew Ebden	6	6
(Italy) Giancarlo Petrazzuolo	3	3
(Germany) Benedikt Dorsch	6	6
(Germany) Alexander Flock	3	4
(South Korea) Jun Woong-sun	6	6^{5}	2
25	(Russia) Mikhail Elgin	2	7^{7}	6

Second round
15	(Germany) Michael Berrer	6	3	6
WC	(Australia) Matthew Ebden	4	6	1
(Germany) Benedikt Dorsch	6	6
25	(Russia) Mikhail Elgin	1	0

Qualifying competition
15	(Germany) Michael Berrer	6	6
(Germany) Benedikt Dorsch	1	2

=== Sixteenth qualifier ===
First round
16	(Switzerland) Stéphane Bohli	1	3
(Italy) Andrea Stoppini	6	6
WC	(Australia) Mark Verryth	6^{5}	1
(Croatia) Antonio Veić	7^{7}	6
(Belgium) Ruben Bemelmans	2	6^{3}
(Czech Republic) Pavel Šnobel	6	7^{7}
(France) Jean-Christophe Faurel	3	3
23	(Germany) Simon Stadler	6	6

Second round
(Italy) Andrea Stoppini	6	6
(Croatia) Antonio Veić	1	1
(Czech Republic) Pavel Šnobel	2	1
23	(Germany) Simon Stadler	6	6

Qualifying competition
(Italy) Andrea Stoppini	7^{7}	1	6
23	(Germany) Simon Stadler	6^{4}	6	3
