= 2009 Australian Open – Women's singles qualifying =

Women's singles qualifying
- 2009 Australian Open

Events
Singles	men	women		boys	girls
Doubles	men	women	mixed	boys	girls
WC Singles	men	women	quad
WC Doubles	men	women	quad
Legends	men	women	mixed

Qualification
Singles	men	women
- Australian Open

This article displays the qualifying draw for the Women's singles at the 2009 Australian Open.

== Seeds ==
1. (Croatia) Jelena Kostanić Tošić (qualifying competition)
2. (France) Stéphanie Foretz (first round)
3. (United States) Julie Ditty (second round)
4. (Czech Republic) Lucie Hradecká (first round)
5. (Estonia) Maret Ani (second round)
6. (United States) Varvara Lepchenko (qualifying competition)
7. (Slovenia) Andreja Klepač (second round)
8. (China) Yan Zi (second round)
9. (Russia) Anna Lapushchenkova (qualifying competition)
10. (United States) Vania King (qualifying competition)
11. (Canada) Stéphanie Dubois (qualified)
12. (Switzerland) Stefanie Vögele (qualifying competition)
13. (Poland) Urszula Radwańska (qualifying competition)
14. (Portugal) Michelle Larcher de Brito (second round)
15. (Slovenia) Maša Zec Peškirič (first round)
16. (Romania) Raluca Olaru (second round)
17. (Russia) Vesna Manasieva (first round)
18. (France) Émilie Loit (first round)
19. (United Kingdom) Elena Baltacha (qualified)
20. (Kazakhstan) Sesil Karatantcheva (qualified)
21. (Argentina) Betina Jozami (qualifying competition)
22. (Colombia) Catalina Castaño (second round)
23. (Japan) Aiko Nakamura (first round)
24. (Russia) Evgeniya Rodina (first round)

== Qualifiers ==
1. (United Kingdom) Elena Baltacha
2. (Ukraine) Viktoriya Kutuzova
3. (United Kingdom) Katie O'Brien
4. (United States) Melanie Oudin
5. (Japan) Kimiko Date-Krumm
6. (Kazakhstan) Sesil Karatantcheva
7. (Croatia) Karolina Šprem
8. (Germany) Julia Schruff
9. (Germany) Kathrin Wörle
10. (Italy) Alberta Brianti
11. (Canada) Stéphanie Dubois
12. (South Africa) Chanelle Scheepers

== Qualifying draw ==
Key

- Q = Qualifier
- WC = Wild card
- LL = Lucky loser
- Alt = Alternate
- ITF = ITF entry
- PR = Protected ranking
- SR = Special ranking
- SE = Special exempt
- JE = Junior exempt
- JR = Junior Accelerator Programme entrant
- CO = College Accelerator Programme entrant
- NG = Next Gen Accelerator Program entrant
- w/o = Walkover
- r = Retired
- d = Defaulted

=== First qualifier ===
First round
1	(Croatia) Jelena Kostanić Tošić	6	6
(South Korea) Lee Ye-ra	4	4
(Germany) Anne Schäfer	6	6
WC	(Australia) Emelyn Starr	4	3
(Spain) Estrella Cabeza Candela	6	6^{4}	2
(United States) Carly Gullickson	2	7^{7}	6
(Latvia) Anastasija Sevastova	3	4
19	(United Kingdom) Elena Baltacha	6	6

Second round
1	(Croatia) Jelena Kostanić Tošić	6	6
(Germany) Anne Schäfer	3	4
(United States) Carly Gullickson	7	0	0
19	(United Kingdom) Elena Baltacha	5	6	6

Qualifying competition
1	(Croatia) Jelena Kostanić Tošić	1	3
19	(United Kingdom) Elena Baltacha	6	6

=== Second qualifier ===
First round
2	(France) Stéphanie Foretz	6^{5}	6^{7}
(United States) Alexandra Stevenson	7^{7}	7^{9}
(Croatia) Sanda Mamić	0	3
(Ukraine) Viktoriya Kutuzova	6	6
(Russia) Olga Puchkova	6	6
(Russia) Nina Bratchikova	3	4
(Portugal) Neuza Silva	6	6^{7}	14
17	(Russia) Vesna Manasieva	4	7^{9}	12

Second round
(United States) Alexandra Stevenson	3	2
(Ukraine) Viktoriya Kutuzova	6	6
(Russia) Olga Puchkova	6	6
(Portugal) Neuza Silva	4	4

Qualifying competition
(Ukraine) Viktoriya Kutuzova	7	7
(Russia) Olga Puchkova	5	5

=== Third qualifier ===
First round
3	(United States) Julie Ditty	2	7	6
(Belarus) Ekaterina Dzehalevich	6	5	4
(Czech Republic) Sandra Záhlavová	5	3
(United Kingdom) Katie O'Brien	7	6
(Italy) Corinna Dentoni	5	4
(Kyrgyzstan) Ksenia Palkina	7	6
WC	(Australia) Anna Wishink	3	0
21	(Argentina) Betina Jozami	6	6

Second round
3	(United States) Julie Ditty	6	3	3
(United Kingdom) Katie O'Brien	3	6	6
(Kyrgyzstan) Ksenia Palkina	6	4	4
21	(Argentina) Betina Jozami	2	6	6

Qualifying competition
(United Kingdom) Katie O'Brien	6	7^{7}
21	(Argentina) Betina Jozami	0	6^{2}

=== Fourth qualifier ===
First round
4	(Czech Republic) Lucie Hradecká	7	1	3
(Russia) Ekaterina Ivanova	5	6	6
(Czech Republic) Eva Hrdinová	4	3
(Slovakia) Lenka Wienerová	6	6
(United States) Sunitha Rao	3	4
(United States) Melanie Oudin	6	6
(Croatia) Petra Martić	6	4	4
22	(Colombia) Catalina Castaño	3	6	6

Second round
(Russia) Ekaterina Ivanova	6	3	4
(Slovakia) Lenka Wienerová	2	6	6
(United States) Melanie Oudin	7	7
22	(Colombia) Catalina Castaño	5	5

Qualifying competition
(Slovakia) Lenka Wienerová	1	2
(United States) Melanie Oudin	6	6

=== Fifth qualifier ===
First round
5	(Estonia) Maret Ani	6	6
(Chinese Taipei) Chan Chin-wei	3	2
(Japan) Kimiko Date-Krumm	6	6
(Russia) Ksenia Pervak	3	3
WC	(Australia) Marija Mirkovic	4	6	6
(Georgia (country)) Margalita Chakhnashvili	6	4	4
(France) Olivia Sanchez	4	5
16	(Romania) Raluca Olaru	6	7

Second round
5	(Estonia) Maret Ani	4	6	0
(Japan) Kimiko Date-Krumm	6	4	6
WC	(Australia) Marija Mirkovic	6	6
16	(Romania) Raluca Olaru	3	4

Qualifying competition
(Japan) Kimiko Date-Krumm	7	6
WC	(Australia) Marija Mirkovic	5	1

=== Sixth qualifier ===
First round
6	(United States) Varvara Lepchenko	6	6
(Czech Republic) Renata Voráčová	3	1
(Germany) Martina Müller	6	6
WC	(Australia) Brittany Sheed	0	0
(Argentina) Jorgelina Cravero	6	2	4
(United States) Madison Brengle	2	6	6
WC	(Australia) Monique Adamczak	6	3	1
20	(Bulgaria) Sesil Karatantcheva	4	6	6

Second round
6	(United States) Varvara Lepchenko	6	6
(Germany) Martina Müller	4	2
(United States) Madison Brengle	6	5	2
20	(Bulgaria) Sesil Karatantcheva	1	7	6

Qualifying competition
6	(United States) Varvara Lepchenko	4	0
20	(Bulgaria) Sesil Karatantcheva	6	6

=== Seventh qualifier ===
First round
7	(Slovenia) Andreja Klepač	6	4	6
(Ukraine) Oxana Lyubtsova	1	6	3
(Georgia (country)) Anna Tatishvili	2	3
(Croatia) Karolina Šprem	6	6
(Belarus) Tatiana Poutchek	6	6
(Tunisia) Selima Sfar	4	3
(Hungary) Katalin Marosi	7^{7}	6
23	(Japan) Aiko Nakamura	6^{5}	3

Second round
7	(Slovenia) Andreja Klepač	1	3
(Croatia) Karolina Šprem	6	6
(Belarus) Tatiana Poutchek	4	6	3
(Hungary) Katalin Marosi	6	3	6

Qualifying competition
(Croatia) Karolina Šprem	6	6
(Hungary) Katalin Marosi	1	2

=== Eighth qualifier ===
First round
8	(China) Yan Zi	6	7
WC	(Australia) Sally Peers	3	5
(Czech Republic) Tereza Hladíková	2	3
(Russia) Alexandra Panova	6	6
(Netherlands) Arantxa Rus	6	6
WC	(Australia) Shannon Golds	3	1
(Germany) Julia Schruff	7	6
24	(Russia) Evgeniya Rodina	5	2

Second round
8	(China) Yan Zi	6^{2}	6	7
(Russia) Alexandra Panova	7^{7}	2	9
(Netherlands) Arantxa Rus	0	3
(Germany) Julia Schruff	6	6

Qualifying competition
(Russia) Alexandra Panova	6^{2}	4
(Germany) Julia Schruff	7^{7}	6

=== Ninth qualifier ===
First round
9	(Russia) Anna Lapushchenkova	6	6
(Germany) Carmen Klaschka	0	2
(Croatia) Ivana Lisjak	6	4	1
(Bosnia and Herzegovina) Mervana Jugić-Salkić	1	6	6
(United States) Alexa Glatch	0	6^{5}
(United Kingdom) Georgie Stoop	6	7^{7}
(Germany) Kathrin Wörle	5	6	8
15	(Slovenia) Maša Zec Peškirič	7	2	6

Second round
9	(Russia) Anna Lapushchenkova	5	6	6
(Bosnia and Herzegovina) Mervana Jugić-Salkić	7	4	3
(United Kingdom) Georgie Stoop	3	7	12
(Germany) Kathrin Wörle	6	5	14

Qualifying competition
9	(Russia) Anna Lapushchenkova	3	6^{3}
(Germany) Kathrin Wörle	6	7^{7}

=== Tenth qualifier ===
First round
10	(United States) Vania King	6^{4}	6	6
(Croatia) Jelena Pandžić	7^{7}	1	1
(Russia) Elena Bovina	4	6^{2}
(Greece) Eleni Daniilidou	6	7^{7}
(Italy) Alberta Brianti	6	6
(Sweden) Johanna Larsson	4	0
(Estonia) Margit Rüütel	2	3
14	(Portugal) Michelle Larcher de Brito	6	6

Second round
10	(United States) Vania King	6^{5}	6	6
(Greece) Eleni Daniilidou	7^{7}	2	1
(Italy) Alberta Brianti	6	6
14	(Portugal) Michelle Larcher de Brito	2	3

Qualifying competition
10	(United States) Vania King	3	6^{4}
(Italy) Alberta Brianti	6	7^{7}

=== Eleventh qualifier ===
First round
11	(Canada) Stéphanie Dubois	4	7	6
WC	(Australia) Sophie Ferguson	6	5	3
(Japan) Kumiko Iijima	6^{5}	3
(Slovakia) Zuzana Kučová	7^{7}	6
(Israel) Tzipora Obziler	6	6
(Czech Republic) Zuzana Ondrášková	1	0
(Italy) Nathalie Viérin	0	1
13	(Poland) Urszula Radwańska	6	6

Second round
11	(Canada) Stéphanie Dubois	6	4	6
(Slovakia) Zuzana Kučová	1	6	0
(Israel) Tzipora Obziler	6^{0}	4
13	(Poland) Urszula Radwańska	7^{7}	6

Qualifying competition
11	(Canada) Stéphanie Dubois	6	6
13	(Poland) Urszula Radwańska	4	4

=== Twelfth qualifier ===
First round
12	(Switzerland) Stefanie Vögele	6	6
(Japan) Rika Fujiwara	1	1
(Japan) Tomoko Yonemura	7	6^{4}	4
(Spain) Sílvia Soler Espinosa	5	7^{7}	6
(Ukraine) Yevgenia Savranska	3	6	4
(South Africa) Chanelle Scheepers	6	3	6
(Ukraine) Yuliana Fedak	6	3	8
18	(France) Émilie Loit	3	6	6

Second round
12	(Switzerland) Stefanie Vögele	6	7
(Spain) Sílvia Soler Espinosa	3	5
(South Africa) Chanelle Scheepers	6	6
(Ukraine) Yuliana Fedak	2	3

Qualifying competition
12	(Switzerland) Stefanie Vögele	6	3	4
(South Africa) Chanelle Scheepers	3	6	6
