= 2009 Australian Open – Girls' singles =

Girls' singles
- 2009 Australian Open

Final
- Champion: (Russia) Ksenia Pervak
- Runner-up: (United Kingdom) Laura Robson
- Score: 6–3, 6–1

Events
Singles	men	women		boys	girls
Doubles	men	women	mixed	boys	girls
WC Singles	men	women	quad
WC Doubles	men	women	quad
Legends	men	women	mixed
- Australian Open

Ksenia Pervak won the title, defeating Laura Robson in the final 6–3, 6–1.

Arantxa Rus was the defending champion, but was no longer eligible to participate in junior events. She competed in the women's singles qualifying competition where she lost to Julia Schruff in the second round.

== Seeds ==
1. (Thailand) Noppawan Lertcheewakarn (semifinals)
2. (Romania) Ana Bogdan (semifinals)
3. (Russia) Ksenia Pervak (champion)
4. (Romania) Elena Bogdan (quarterfinals)
5. (United Kingdom) Laura Robson (final)
6. (Croatia) Ajla Tomljanović (first round)
7. (France) Kristina Mladenovic (quarterfinals)
8. (United States) Lauren Embree (third round)
9. (United Kingdom) Heather Watson (quarterfinals)
10. (Japan) Aki Yamasoto (second round)
11. (Kazakhstan) Zarina Diyas (first round)
12. (Germany) Linda Berlinecke (first round)
13. (Russia) Yana Buchina (third round)
14. (Russia) Ksenia Kirillova (third round)
15. (Indonesia) Beatrice Gumulya (third round)
16. (Ukraine) Nadiya Kichenok (first round)

== Draw ==
Key

- Q = Qualifier
- WC = Wild card
- LL = Lucky loser
- Alt = Alternate
- ITF = ITF entry
- PR = Protected ranking
- SR = Special ranking
- SE = Special exempt
- JE = Junior exempt
- JR = Junior Accelerator Programme entrant
- CO = College Accelerator Programme entrant
- NG = Next Gen Accelerator Program entrant
- w/o = Walkover
- r = Retired
- d = Defaulted

=== Finals ===
Quarterfinals
1	(Thailand) Noppawan Lertcheewakarn	6	6
(Belarus) Anna Orlik	1	0
4	(Romania) Elena Bogdan	3	5^{r}
5	(United Kingdom) Laura Robson	6	2
9	(United Kingdom) Heather Watson	3	5
3	(Russia) Ksenia Pervak	6	7
7	(France) Kristina Mladenovic	4	2
2	(Romania) Ana Bogdan	6	6

Semifinals
1	(Thailand) Noppawan Lertcheewakarn	4	3
5	(United Kingdom) Laura Robson	6	6
3	(Russia) Ksenia Pervak	6	6
2	(Romania) Ana Bogdan	1	3

Final
5	(United Kingdom) Laura Robson	3	1
3	(Russia) Ksenia Pervak	6	6

=== Top half ===
==== Section 1 ====
First round
1	(Thailand) N Lertcheewakarn	6	6
Q	(Brazil) F Faria	0	0
(Netherlands) Q Lemoine	4	7	6
(Australia) S Peers	6	5	3
WC	(Australia) O Rogowska	6	6
Q	(Chinese Taipei) T-f Juan	4	4
(Poland) S Zaniewska	7	6
16	(Ukraine) N Kichenok	5	3
10	(Japan) A Yamasoto	6	6^{4}	7
(South Africa) B Swanepoel	1	7^{7}	5
(Belarus) A Orlik	6	6
(Russia) K Pimkina	4	2
WC	(Australia) S Letcher	6	6
(Czech Republic) M Kubičíková	3	3
Q	(Thailand) L Kumkhum	4	0
8	(United States) L Embree	6	6

Second round
1	(Thailand) N Lertcheewakarn	6	6
(Netherlands) Q Lemoine	3	2
WC	(Australia) O Rogowska	6	7^{7}
(Poland) S Zaniewska	1	6^{3}
10	(Japan) A Yamasoto	0	3
(Belarus) A Orlik	6	6
WC	(Australia) S Letcher	6	5	0
8	(United States) L Embree	3	7	6

Third round
1	(Thailand) N Lertcheewakarn	6	6
WC	(Australia) O Rogowska	3	1
(Belarus) A Orlik	6	6
8	(United States) L Embree	2	4

Quarterfinals
1	(Thailand) N Lertcheewakarn	6	6
(Belarus) A Orlik	1	0

==== Section 2 ====
First round
4	(Romania) E Bogdan	6	6
Q	(Ukraine) M Zanevska	2	1
(Australia) I Holland	6	7
(Oman) F Al-Nabhani	1	5
(Czech Republic) M Tůmová	6	6
(India) K Shroff	0	3
WC	(Australia) V Rajicic	2	4
13	(Russia) Y Buchina	6	6
12	(Germany) L Berlinecke	3	2
(Croatia) S Njirić	6	6
(Russia) P Rodionova	7	6
WC	(Australia) M Wejnert	5	2
(Thailand) K Narattana	6	6
(Sweden) A Brazhnikova	3	4
(United States) C McHale	5	3
5	(United Kingdom) L Robson	7	6

Second round
4	(Romania) E Bogdan	6	5	6
(Australia) I Holland	1	7	1
(Czech Republic) M Tůmová	2	4
13	(Russia) Y Buchina	6	6
(Croatia) S Njirić	6	6
(Russia) P Rodionova	1	1
(Thailand) K Narattana	3	6^{0}
5	(United Kingdom) L Robson	6	7^{7}

Third round
4	(Romania) E Bogdan	4
13	(Russia) Y Buchina	3^{r}
(Croatia) S Njirić	4	2
5	(United Kingdom) L Robson	6	6

Quarterfinals
4	(Romania) E Bogdan	3	5^{r}
5	(United Kingdom) L Robson	6	2

=== Bottom half ===
==== Section 3 ====
First round
6	(Croatia) A Tomljanović	3	4
WC	(Australia) B Sheed	6	6
(Japan) M Inoue	2	6	6
Q	(Russia) AA Marenko	6	3	0
(South Africa) C Simmonds	6	6
(Thailand) N Saenyaukhot	0	1
WC	(Australia) H Sheahan	2	1
9	(United Kingdom) H Watson	6	6
15	(Indonesia) B Gumulya	3	6	6
(United States) E Goldfeld	6	1	4
(Czech Republic) M Borecká	4	6^{3}
(Slovakia) Z Luknárová	6	7^{7}
Q	(Canada) E Bouchard	6	6
WC	(Australia) O Rich	3	1
(Netherlands) R Hogenkamp	4	4
3	(Russia) K Pervak	6	6

Second round
WC	(Australia) B Sheed	3	5
(Japan) M Inoue	6	7
(South Africa) C Simmonds	2	1
9	(United Kingdom) H Watson	6	6
15	(Indonesia) B Gumulya	7^{8}	4	6
(Slovakia) Z Luknárová	6^{6}	6	2
Q	(Canada) E Bouchard	2	3
3	(Russia) K Pervak	6	6

Third round
(Japan) M Inoue	6^{1}	6	4
9	(United Kingdom) H Watson	7^{7}	4	6
15	(Indonesia) B Gumulya	2	1
3	(Russia) K Pervak	6	6

Quarterfinals
9	(United Kingdom) H Watson	3	5
3	(Russia) K Pervak	6	7

==== Section 4 ====
First round
7	(France) K Mladenovic	6	6
(Croatia) A Konjuh	3	1
(Australia) M Vriens	6	6
(United States) B Capra	3	3
(India) R Teltumbde	2	2
Q	(Thailand) N Lertpitaksinchai	6	6
(Russia) V Kamenskaya	6	4	7
11	(Kazakhstan) Z Diyas	3	6	5
14	(Russia) K Kirillova	6	6
(Thailand) K Issara	1	4
Q	(United States) A Cercone	7^{7}	6
(Ukraine) L Kichenok	6^{3}	0
(United Kingdom) H James	6	4	5
(Serbia) A Krunić	2	6	7
WC	(Australia) A Sumner	2	1
2	(Romania) A Bogdan	6	6

Second round
7	(France) K Mladenovic	6	6
(Australia) M Vriens	2	1
Q	(Thailand) N Lertpitaksinchai	4	1
(Russia) V Kamenskaya	6	6
14	(Russia) K Kirillova	6	3	6
Q	(United States) A Cercone	3	6	4
(Serbia) A Krunić	4	6	3
2	(Romania) A Bogdan	6	2	6

Third round
7	(France) K Mladenovic	4	6	6
(Russia) V Kamenskaya	6	1	2
14	(Russia) K Kirillova	3	1^{r}
2	(Romania) A Bogdan	6	4

Quarterfinals
7	(France) K Mladenovic	4	2
2	(Romania) A Bogdan	6	6
