= Julen Urigüen =

Guatemalan tennis player

- Country (sports): Guatemala
- Residence: Guatemala
- Born: July 22, 1991 (age 34) Guatemala City, Guatemala
- Height: 1.85 m (6 ft 1 in)
- Plays: Right-handed (two-handed backhand)
- College: University of Virginia
- Prize money: $1,811

Singles
- Career record: 2-3
- Career titles: 0
- Highest ranking: No. 1063 (22 November 2010)

Grand Slam singles results
- Australian Open Junior: SF (2009)
- French Open Junior: 1R (2009)
- Wimbledon Junior: 1R (2009)
- US Open Junior: 1R (2009)

Doubles
- Career record: 0–0
- Highest ranking: No. 959 (23 August 2010)

Grand Slam doubles results
- Australian Open Junior: 1R (2009)
- French Open Junior: 1R (2009)
- Wimbledon Junior: 1R (2009)
- US Open Junior: 1R (2009)
- Last updated on: 3 July 2017.

Julen Urigüen Sieveking (born July 22, 1991 in Guatemala City, Guatemala) is a former professional tennis player who lives in the United States. He has competed for the Guatemala Davis Cup team.

== Early life ==
Urigüen started to play tennis when he was 9 years old, choosing to focus on it when he was 11. He became part of the all-Guatemalan junior tennis team in every category.

== Junior career ==
Urigüen competed at the 2009 Australian Open in the Boys Singles, where he made it to the semi-finals after being seeded second. He lost in the first round at Roland Garros, where he had been seeded fifth.

Urigüen also plays doubles, with Harry Fowler in Australia (seeded 4th, eliminated in the first round) and with Tennys Sandgren at the French Open (seeded 3rd, eliminated first round).

== College career ==
It was announced in April 2009 that he had signed to play with the University of Virginia Cavaliers men's tennis team. He graduated in 2013.
