= Viktoria Kamenskaya =

Russian tennis player (born 1991)

Viktoria Kamenskaya Виктория Каменская
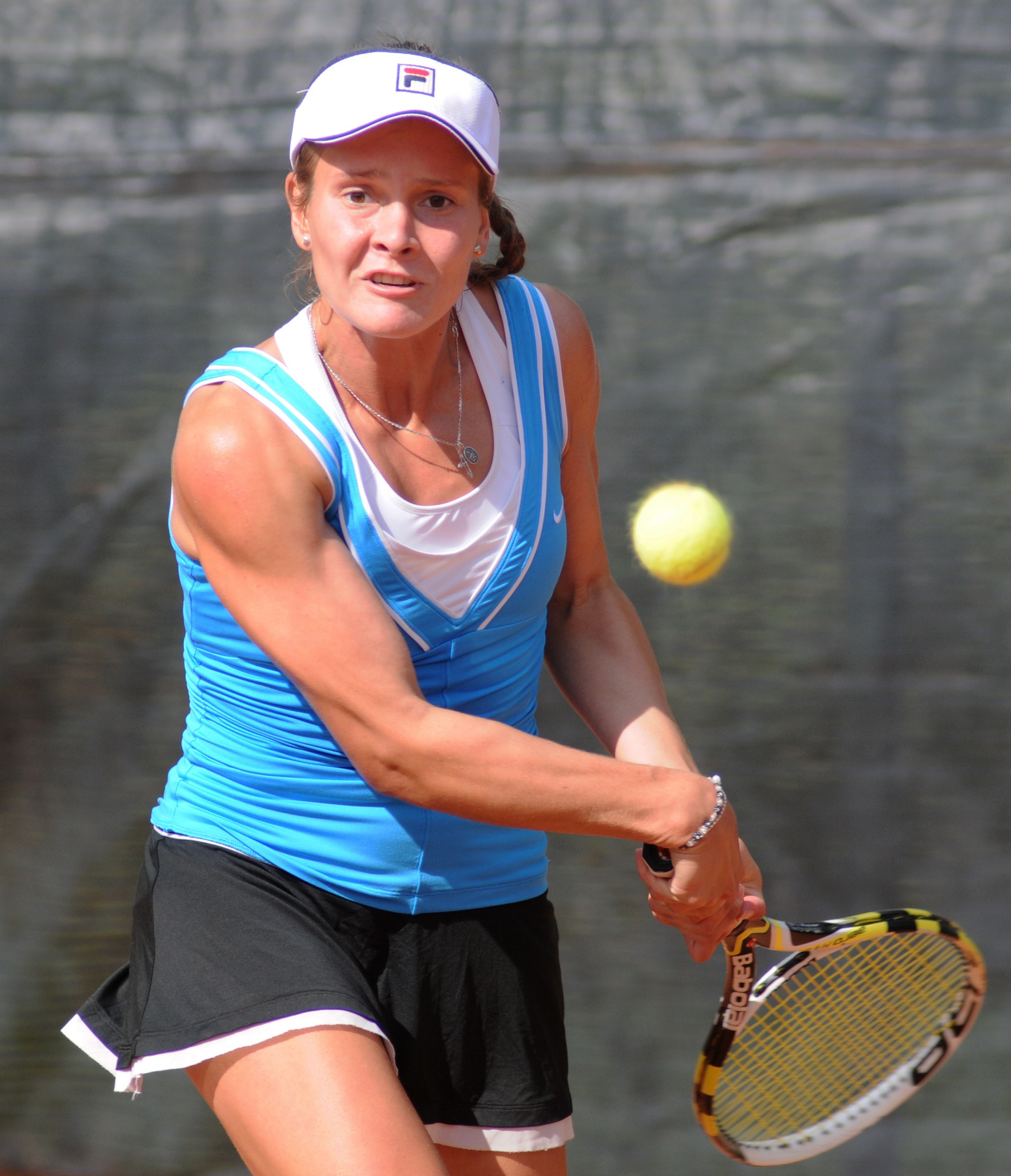
- Full name: Viktoria Vladimirovna Kamenskaya
- Country (sports): Russia
- Residence: Moscow, Russia
- Born: 26 November 1991 (age 33); Moscow, Russian SFSR, Soviet Union
- Retired: Jan 2019 (last match)
- Plays: Right (two-handed backhand)
- Prize money: $127,318

Singles
- Career record: 185–107
- Career titles: 8 ITF
- Highest ranking: No. 182 (17 July 2017)

Grand Slam singles results
- Australian Open: Q1 (2017)
- French Open: Q2 (2017)
- Wimbledon: Q1 (2017)
- US Open: Q3 (2017)

Doubles
- Career record: 19–23
- Career titles: 3 ITF
- Highest ranking: No. 648 (25 October 2010)

Viktoria Vladimirovna Kamenskaya (Russian: Виктория Владимировна Каменская; born 26 November 1991) is a Russian former tennis player.

She has career-high WTA rankings of 182 in singles, achieved on 17 July 2017, and 648 in doubles, reached on 25 October 2010. Kamenskaya won eight singles titles and three doubles titles on tournaments of the ITF Women's Circuit.

On the ITF Junior Circuit, she had a career-high combined ranking of 14, achieved in October 2008. She reached the quarterfinals of both the 2009 Australian Open girls' doubles events.

Kamenskaya made her WTA Tour main-draw debut at the 2017 İstanbul Cup, going through the qualifying.

== ITF finals ==
=== Singles (8–4) ===
Legend $25,000 tournaments $10,000 tournaments	Finals by surface Hard (0–1) Clay (8–3)

Result	No.	Date	Tournament	Surface	Opponent	Score
Win	1.	7 February 2010	ITF Mallorca, Spain	Clay	(Spain) Garbiñe Muguruza	7–6^{(4)}, 3–6, 6–2
Loss	2.	27 June 2010	ITF Davos, Switzerland	Clay	(Switzerland) Myriam Casanova	3–6, 6–4, 4–6
Win	3.	3 October 2010	ITF Antalya, Turkey	Clay	(Czech Republic) Zuzana Zálabská	6–3, 6–0
Win	4.	10 October 2010	ITF Antalya, Turkey	Clay	(Slovakia) Karin Morgošová	6–4, 6–0
Win	5.	9 August 2015	ITF Moscow, Russia	Clay	(Turkey) Başak Eraydın	6–2, 6–2
Win	6.	15 August 2015	Tatarstan Open, Russia	Clay	(Russia) Alena Tarasova	6–1, 6–3
Loss	7.	13 September 2015	Sofia Cup, Bulgaria	Clay	(Romania) Ana Bogdan	2–6, 6–3, 5–7
Loss	8.	26 December 2015	Pune Championships, India	Hard	(Belarus) Aryna Sabalenka	3–6, 4–6
Win	9.	13 August 2016	ITF Moscow, Russia	Clay	(Russia) Alena Tarasova	6–3, 6–2
Loss	10.	20 August 2016	ITF Moscow, Russia	Clay	(Russia) Anastasiya Komardina	4–6, 2–6
Win	11.	3 September 2016	ITF Almaty, Kazakhstan	Clay	(Russia) Anna Blinkova	1–6, 6–3, 6–2
Win	12.	11 September 2016	ITF Sofia, Bulgaria	Clay	(Bulgaria) Viktoriya Tomova	6–4, 6–7^{(5)}, 6–0

=== Doubles (3–0) ===
Legend $25,000 tournaments $10,000 tournaments	Finals by surface Hard (0–0) Clay (3–0)

Result	No.	Date	Tournament	Surface	Partner	Opponents	Score
Win	1.	6 February 2010	ITF Mallorca, Spain	Clay	(Russia) Daria Kuchmina	(Morocco) Fatima El Allami (Morocco) Nadia Lalami	7–5, 6–4
Win	2.	2 October 2010	ITF Antalya, Turkey	Clay	(Russia) Ksenia Kirillova	(Italy) Giulia Gasparri (Italy) Verdiana Verardi	6–7^{(10)}, 6–3, [10–3]
Win	3.	9 October 2010	ITF Antalya, Turkey	Clay	(Belarus) Anna Orlik	(Slovakia) Chantal Škamlová (Czech Republic) Monika Tůmová	7–6^{(7)}, 6–4
