= Sandra Zaniewska =

Polish tennis player and coach (born 1992)

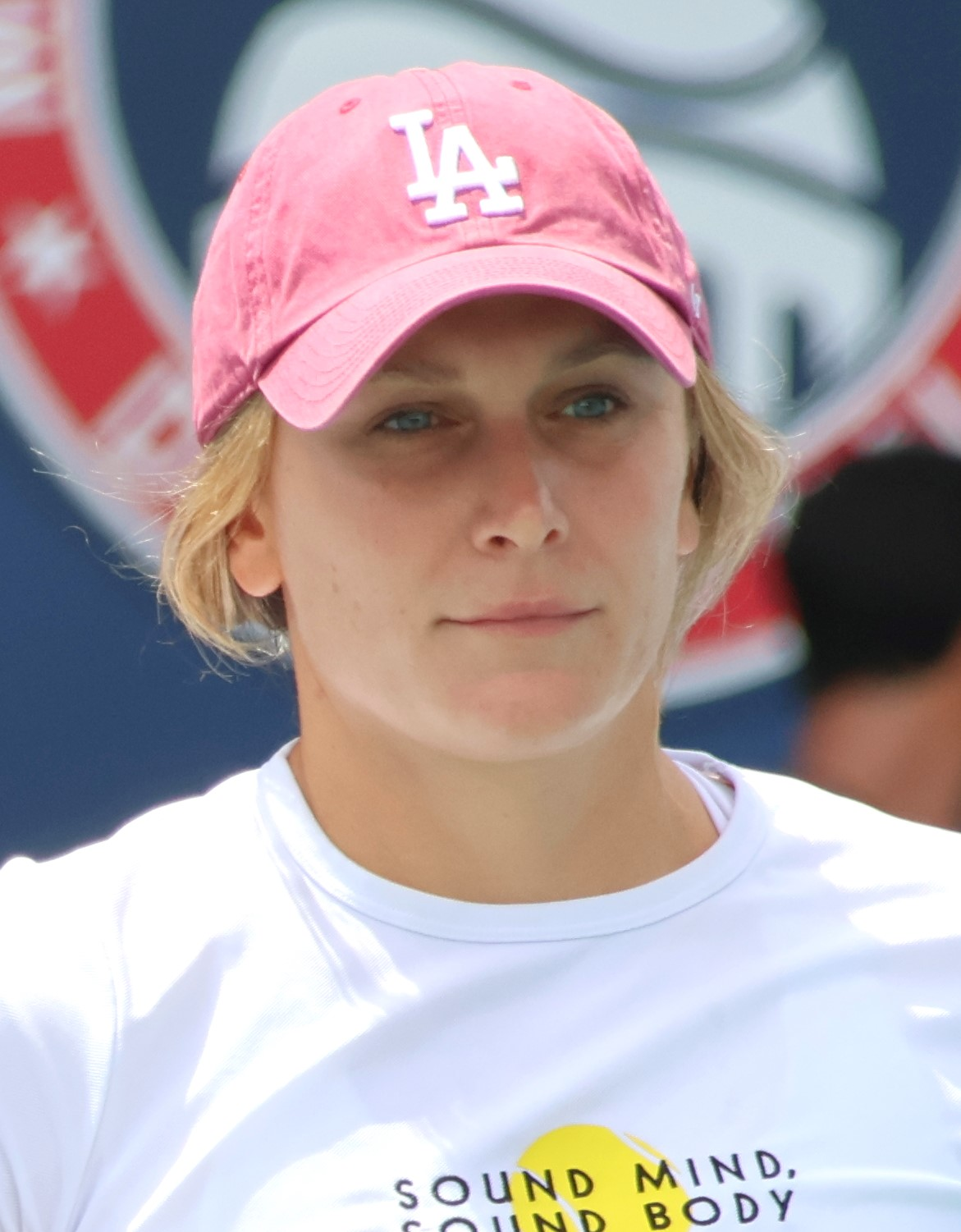
- Zaniewska in 2025
- Country (sports): Poland
- Residence: Katowice, Poland
- Born: 3 January 1992 (age 34) Katowice
- Height: 1.72 m (5 ft 8 in)
- Turned pro: 2009
- Retired: (last match 2017)
- Plays: Right (two-handed backhand)
- Prize money: $139,683

Singles
- Career record: 244–133
- Career titles: 10 ITF
- Highest ranking: No. 142 (27 August 2012)

Grand Slam singles results
- French Open: Q3 (2012)
- Wimbledon: 1R (2012)
- US Open: Q1 (2012)

Doubles
- Career record: 117–81
- Career titles: 7 ITF
- Highest ranking: No. 203 (29 October 2012)

Sandra Zaniewska (born 3 January 1992) is a Polish tennis coach and former professional player.

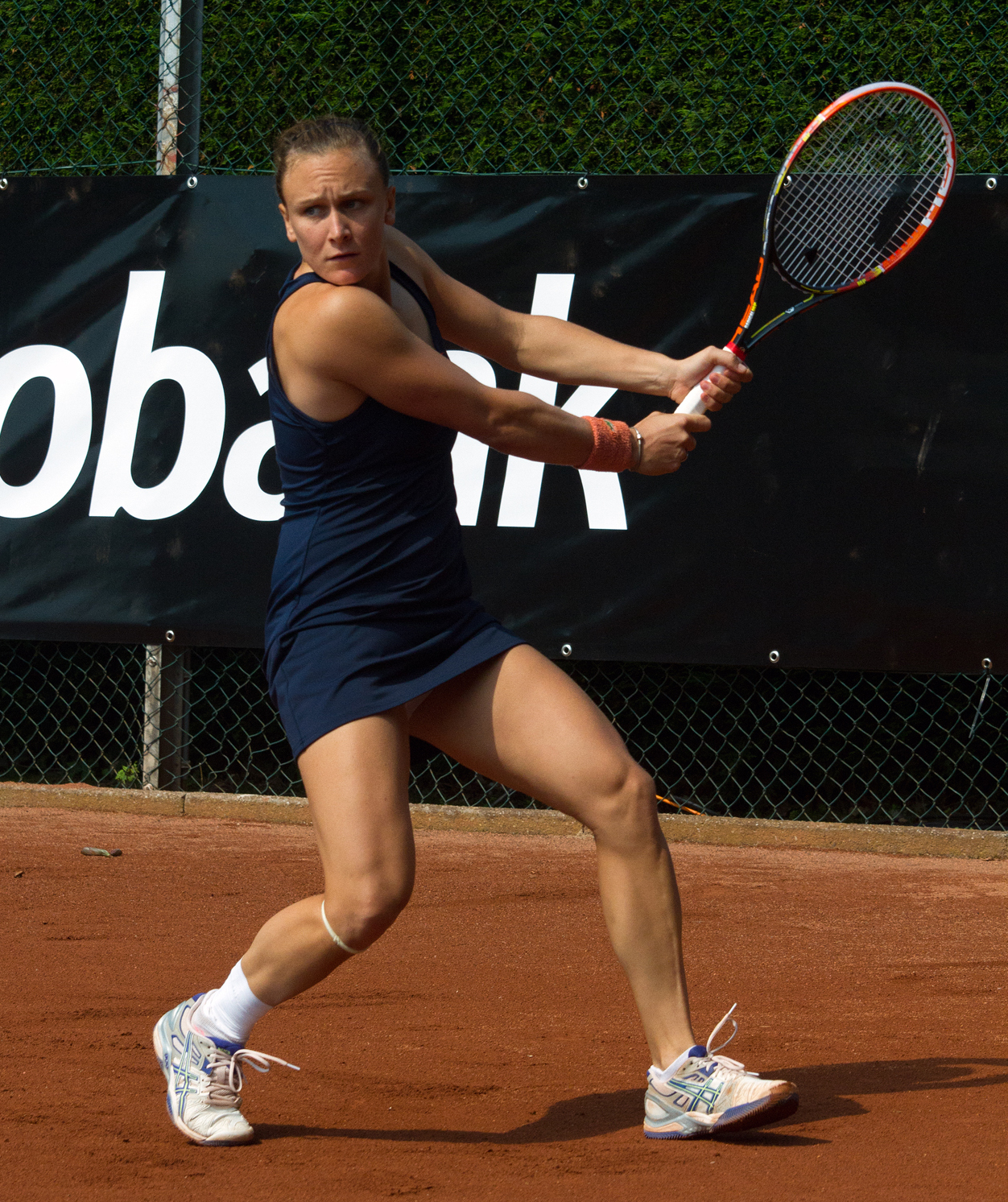
Zaniewska playing in 2015

In her career, she won 10 singles tournaments and seven in doubles on the ITF Circuit, and she was the runner-up of the 2009 Australian Open in girls' doubles, with partner Aleksandra Krunić.

Zaniewska, who competed on the pro tour until June 2017, began coaching Ukrainian professional tennis player Marta Kostyuk in July 2023. She previously coached Alizé Cornet and Petra Martić.

== Personal life ==
Sandra Zaniewska was born to Maciej Zaniewski and Teresa Zaniewska on 3 January 1992 in Katowice. She has one brother, Bartek. Sandra began playing tennis at age 10.

== ITF finals ==
=== Singles: 20 (10–10) ===
Legend $25,000 tournaments $15,000 tournaments $10,000 tournaments	Finals by surface Hard (2–2) Clay (8–8)

Result	No.	Date	Tournament	Surface	Opponent	Score
Loss	1.	19 July 2009	ITF Izmir, Turkey	Clay	(Turkey) Pemra Özgen	0–6, 4–6
Win	1.	9 August 2009	ITF Iława, Poland	Clay	(Slovakia) Zuzana Zlochová	6–4, 6–4
Loss	2.	2 May 2010	ITF Antalya, Turkey	Clay	(Tunisia) Ons Jabeur	1–2 ret.
Win	2.	20 June 2010	ITF Cologne, Germany	Clay	(Germany) Julia Babilon	6–4, 6–4
Win	3.	19 June 2011	ITF Cologne, Germany	Clay	(Germany) Lena-Marie Hofmann	6–4, 6–2
Loss	3.	18 September 2011	ITF Cairns, Australia	Hard	(Australia) Casey Dellacqua	4–6, 6–7^{(3)}
Loss	4.	4 March 2012	ITF Wellington, New Zealand	Hard	(China) Duan Yingying	1–6, 4–6
Win	4.	25 March 2012	ITF Ipswich, Australia	Clay	(Australia) Ashleigh Barty	7–6^{(5)}, 6–1
Win	5.	1 April 2012	ITF Bundaberg, Australia	Clay	(Japan) Shuko Aoyama	6–3, 6–2
Win	6.	28 April 2012	Nana Trophy, Tunisia	Clay	(Tunisia) Ons Jabeur	6–4, 4–6, 6–2
Loss	5.	24 May 2013	ITF Casablanca, Morocco	Clay	(Spain) Laura Pous Tió	3–6, 0–6
Win	7.	3 November 2013	ITF Sharm El Sheikh, Egypt	Hard	(Italy) Valeria Prosperi	6–4, 6–1
Win	8.	6 April 2014	ITF Sharm El Sheikh, Egypt	Hard	(Romania) Elena-Teodora Cadar	6–2, 6–1
Loss	6.	21 June 2014	ITF Ystad, Sweden	Clay	(Slovenia) Nastja Kolar	4–6, 4–6
Loss	7.	29 March 2015	ITF Mornington, Australia	Clay	(Australia) Priscilla Hon	7–5, 3–6, 6–7^{(4)}
Loss	8.	28 June 2015	ITF Breda, Netherlands	Clay	(Czech Republic) Jesika Malečková	3–6, 7–5, 5–7
Win	9.	24 April 2016	ITF Hammamet, Tunisia	Clay	(Italy) Angelica Moratelli	7–6^{(4)}, 6–2
Win	10.	1 May 2016	ITF Hammamet, Tunisia	Clay	(Algeria) Inès Ibbou	6–1, 6–4
Loss	9.	30 July 2016	ITF Maaseik, Belgium	Clay	(Belgium) Déborah Kerfs	2–6, 5–7
Loss	10.	12 March 2017	ITF Hammamet, Tunisia	Clay	(Italy) Camilla Scala	6–1, 3–6, 3–6

=== Doubles: 22 (7–15) ===
Legend $100,000 tournaments $50,000 tournaments $25,000 tournaments $15,000 tournaments $10,000 tournaments	Finals by surface Hard (3–6) Clay (4–9)

Result	No.	Date	Tournament	Surface	Partner	Opponents	Score
Loss	1.	9 November 2008	ITF Krakow, Poland	Hard (i)	(Poland) Olga Brózda	(Germany) Angelique Kerber (Poland) Urszula Radwańska	3–6, 2–6
Loss	2.	15 March 2009	ITF Giza, Egypt	Clay	(Netherlands) Bibiane Schoofs	(Russia) Galina Fokina (Ukraine) Alyona Sotnikova	4–6, 6–3, [8–10]
Loss	3.	18 July 2009	ITF Izmir, Turkey	Clay	(Czech Republic) Zuzana Linhová	(Georgia (country)) Sofia Kvatsabaia (Russia) Avgusta Tsybysheva	0–6, 6–3, [5–10]
Win	1.	2 May 2010	ITF Antalya, Turkey	Clay	(Turkey) Pemra Özgen	(Croatia) Indire Akiki (Czech Republic) Martina Kubičíková	6–1, 6–2
Loss	4.	16 October 2010	ITF Mount Gambier, Australia	Hard	(Australia) Daniella Dominikovic	(Australia) Alison Bai (Brazil) Ana-Clara Duarte	w/o
Loss	5.	12 February 2011	ITF Rancho Mirage, United States	Hard	(Russia) Nadejda Guskova	(Czech Republic) Karolína Plíšková (Czech Republic) Kristýna Plíšková	7–6^{(6)}, 1–6, [5–10]
Win	2.	19 March 2011	ITF Antalya, Turkey	Clay	(Turkey) Pemra Özgen	(Hungary) Réka Luca Jani (Czech Republic) Martina Kubičíková	2–6, 7–5, [10–7]
Loss	6.	9 April 2011	ITF Bundaberg, Australia	Clay	(Australia) Daniella Dominikovic	(Australia) Casey Dellacqua (Australia) Olivia Rogowska	5–7, 4–6
Loss	7.	9 October 2011	ITF Esperance, Australıa	Hard	(Australia) Monique Adamczak	(Australia) Casey Dellacqua (Australia) Olivia Rogowska]	3–6, 2–6
Win	3.	24 March 2012	ITF Ipswich, Australia	Clay	(Australia) Monique Adamczak	(Japan) Shuko Aoyama (Japan) Junri Namigata	7–5, 6–4
Win	4.	20 October 2012	Open de Limoges, France	Hard (i)	(Poland) Magda Linette	(France) Irena Pavlovic (Switzerland) Stefanie Vögele	6–1, 5–7, [10–5]
Loss	8.	24 May 2013	ITF Casablanca, Morocco	Clay	(Bulgaria) Elitsa Kostova	(Germany) Justine Ozga (Germany) Anna Zaja	4–6, 2–6
Loss	9.	30 June 2013	ITF Stuttgart, Germany	Clay	(Liechtenstein) Stephanie Vogt	(Germany) Kristina Barrois (Germany) Laura Siegemund	6–7^{(1)}, 4–6
Win	5.	26 October 2013	ITF Sharm El Sheikh, Egypt	Hard	(Belgium) Elise Mertens	(Ukraine) Valeriya Strakhova (Brazil) Karina Venditti	6–4, 6–7^{(5)}, [12–10]
Loss	10.	28 June 2014	ITF Kristinehamn, Sweden	Clay	(Belgium) Ysaline Bonaventure	(Ukraine) Kateryna Bondarenko (Sweden) Cornelia Lister	w/o
Win	6.	13 September 2014	Batumi Ladies Open, Georgia	Hard	(Belgium) An-Sophie Mestach	(Bulgaria) Aleksandrina Naydenova (Ukraine) Valeriya Strakhova	6–1, 6–1
Loss	11.	3 April 2015	ITF Melbourne, Australia	Clay	(Poland) Agata Barańska	(Australia) Priscilla Hon (Australia) Tammi Patterson	6–2, 4–6, [10–12]
Win	7.	20 June 2015	ITF Alkmaar, Netherlands	Clay	(Australia) Sally Peers	(Germany) Anna Klasen (Germany) Charlotte Klasen	6–3, 6–4
Loss	12.	29 January 2016	ITF Bertioga, Brazil	Hard	(Poland) Katarzyna Kawa	(Romania) Cristina Dinu (Netherlands) Indy de Vroome	3–6, 3–6
Loss	13.	14 October 2016	ITF Cairns, Australia	Hard	(Poland) Katarzyna Kawa	(Australia) Alison Bai (Australia) Lizette Cabrera	5–7, 7–5, [10–12]
Loss	14.	4 March 2017	ITF Hammamet, Tunisia	Clay	(Netherlands) Dominique Karregat	(Italy) Natasha Piludu (Italy) Gaia Sanesi	3–6, 2–6
Loss	15.	8 April 2017	ITF Pula, Italy	Clay	(Netherlands) Bibiane Schoofs	(Italy) Alice Matteucci (Italy) Camilla Rosatello	1–6, 3–6

== Junior Grand Slam finals ==
=== Girls' doubles ===
Outcome	Year	Tournament	Surface	Partner	Opponents	Score
Runner-up	2009	Australian Open	Hard	(Serbia) Aleksandra Krunić	(United States) Christina McHale (Croatia) Ajla Tomljanović	1–6, 6–2, [4–10]
