= 2009 Australian Open – Mixed doubles =

Mixed doubles
- 2009 Australian Open

Final
- Champions: (India) Sania Mirza (India) Mahesh Bhupathi
- Runners-up: (France) Nathalie Dechy (Israel) Andy Ram
- Score: 6–3, 6–1

Details
- Draw: 32
- Seeds: 8

Events
Singles	men	women		boys	girls
Doubles	men	women	mixed	boys	girls
WC Singles	men	women	quad
WC Doubles	men	women	quad
Legends	men	women	mixed
- Australian Open

Sun Tiantian and Nenad Zimonjić were the defending champions, but Sun chose not to participate. Zimonjić partnered with Anna-Lena Grönefeld, but lost in the first round to Cara Black and Leander Paes.

Sania Mirza and Mahesh Bhupathi won the title, defeating Nathalie Dechy and Andy Ram in the final 6–3, 6–1.

== Seeds ==
1. (Zimbabwe) Cara Black / (India) Leander Paes (second round)
2. (China) Yan Zi / (The Bahamas) Mark Knowles (second round)
3. (United States) Lisa Raymond / (Poland) Marcin Matkowski (first round)
4. (United States) Liezel Huber / (United Kingdom) Jamie Murray (second round)
5. (Ukraine) Alona Bondarenko / (Brazil) André Sá (first round)
6. (Czech Republic) Květa Peschke / (Czech Republic) Pavel Vízner (first round)
7. (Spain) Anabel Medina Garrigues / (Spain) Tommy Robredo (semifinals)
8. (Ukraine) Kateryna Bondarenko / (Australia) Jordan Kerr (first round)

== Draw ==
Key

- Q = Qualifier
- WC = Wild card
- LL = Lucky loser
- Alt = Alternate
- ITF = ITF entry
- PR = Protected ranking
- SR = Special ranking
- SE = Special exempt
- JE = Junior exempt
- JR = Junior Accelerator Programme entrant
- CO = College Accelerator Programme entrant
- NG = Next Gen Accelerator Program entrant
- w/o = Walkover
- r = Retired
- d = Defaulted

=== Finals ===
Semifinals
7	(Spain) Anabel Medina Garrigues (Spain) Tommy Robredo	6^{7}	4
(France) Nathalie Dechy (Israel) Andy Ram	7	6
(Czech Republic) Iveta Benešová (Czech Republic) Lukáš Dlouhý	4	1
WC	(India) Sania Mirza (India) Mahesh Bhupathi	6	6

Final
(France) Nathalie Dechy (Israel) Andy Ram	3	1
WC	(India) Sania Mirza (India) Mahesh Bhupathi	6	6

=== Top half ===
First round
1	(Zimbabwe) C Black (India) L Paes	6	4	[10]
(Germany) A-L Grönefeld (Serbia) N Zimonjić	4	6	[7]
Alt	(Russia) A Kleybanova (Brazil) B Soares	3	4
(Switzerland) P Schnyder (South Africa) W Moodie	6	6
(Kazakhstan) G Voskoboeva (Zimbabwe) K Ullyett	6^{5}	7	[10]
(Chinese Taipei) C-j Chuang (Germany) C Kas	7	5	[12]
(Russia) E Vesnina (Czech Republic) M Damm	4	3
7	(Spain) A Medina Garrigues (Spain) T Robredo	6	6
4	(United States) L Huber (United Kingdom) J Murray	6	7
WC	(Australia) S Ferguson (Australia) C Guccione	2	5
(France) N Dechy (Israel) A Ram	6	6
(Australia) R Stubbs (Czech Republic) F Čermák	1	4
(Israel) S Pe'er (Sweden) R Lindstedt	6^{0}	5
(Slovakia) D Cibulková (Austria) J Melzer	7	7
WC	(Australia) J Gajdošová (Australia) S Groth	6	6
8	(Ukraine) K Bondarenko (Australia) J Kerr	4	3

Second round
1	(Zimbabwe) C Black (India) L Paes	1	5
(Switzerland) P Schnyder (South Africa) W Moodie	6	7
(Chinese Taipei) C-j Chuang (Germany) C Kas	6	1	[8]
7	(Spain) A Medina Garrigues (Spain) T Robredo	4	6	[10]
4	(United States) L Huber (United Kingdom) J Murray	7	2	[4]
(France) N Dechy (Israel) A Ram	6^{6}	6	[10]
(Slovakia) D Cibulková (Austria) J Melzer	6^{2}	6	[10]
WC	(Australia) J Gajdošová (Australia) S Groth	7	2	[5]

Quarterfinals
(Switzerland) P Schnyder (South Africa) W Moodie	7	4	[10]
7	(Spain) A Medina Garrigues (Spain) T Robredo	5	6	[12]
(France) N Dechy (Israel) A Ram	7	6
(Slovakia) D Cibulková (Austria) J Melzer	5	1

Semifinals
7	(Spain) A Medina Garrigues (Spain) Tommy Robredo	6^{7}	4
(France) N Dechy (Israel) A Ram	7	6

=== Bottom half ===
First round
5	(Ukraine) A Bondarenko (Brazil) A Sá	6	4	[6]
(France) A Cornet (Brazil) M Melo	3	6	[10]
(Italy) F Pennetta (Serbia) D Vemić	6	6
(Czech Republic) V Uhlířová (Poland) M Fyrstenberg	4	4
(Italy) M Santangelo (Sweden) S Aspelin	7	6
(Italy) F Schiavone (South Africa) J Coetzee	5	3
(Czech Republic) I Benešová (Czech Republic) L Dlouhý	7	4	[10]
3	(United States) L Raymond (Poland) M Matkowski	6^{4}	6	[5]
6	(Czech Republic) K Peschke (Czech Republic) P Vízner	2	4
WC	(India) S Mirza (India) M Bhupathi	6	6
WC	(Australia) A Rodionova (Australia) S Huss	7	7
WC	(Australia) J Moore (Australia) C Ball	5	5
WC	(Australia) M Wejnert (Australia) B Tomic	3	2
(Canada) A Wozniak (Canada) D Nestor	6	6
(Russia) N Petrova (Belarus) M Mirnyi	3	3
2	(China) Z Yan (The Bahamas) M Knowles	6	6

Second round
(France) A Cornet (Brazil) M Melo	6	4	[10]
(Italy) F Pennetta (Serbia) D Vemić	3	6	[4]
(Italy) M Santangelo (Sweden) S Aspelin	6	2	[10]
(Czech Republic) I Benešová (Czech Republic) L Dlouhý	3	6	[12]
WC	(India) S Mirza (India) M Bhupathi	6	6
WC	(Australia) A Rodionova (Australia) S Huss	1	2
(Canada) A Wozniak (Canada) D Nestor	7^{10}	6
2	(China) Z Yan (The Bahamas) M Knowles	6^{8}	4

Quarterfinals
(France) A Cornet (Brazil) M Melo
(Czech Republic) I Benešová (Czech Republic) L Dlouhý	w/o
WC	(India) S Mirza (India) M Bhupathi	3	6	[10]
(Canada) A Wozniak (Canada) D Nestor	6	4	[5]

Semifinals
(Czech Republic) I Benešová (Czech Republic) L Dlouhý	4	1
WC	(India) S Mirza (India) M Bhupathi	6	6
