= 2009 Australian Open – Men's doubles =

Men's doubles
- 2009 Australian Open

Final
- Champion: (United States) Bob Bryan (United States) Mike Bryan
- Runner-up: (India) Mahesh Bhupathi (The Bahamas) Mark Knowles
- Score: 2–6, 7–5, 6–0

Details
- Draw: 64
- Seeds: 16

Events
Singles	men	women		boys	girls
Doubles	men	women	mixed	boys	girls
WC Singles	men	women	quad
WC Doubles	men	women	quad
Legends	men	women	mixed
- Australian Open

Jonathan Erlich and Andy Ram were the defending champions, but Erlich chose not to participate due to an elbow injury, and only Ram competed that year.
Ram partnered with Max Mirnyi, but lost to Feliciano López and Fernando Verdasco in the second round.

Bob Bryan and Mike Bryan won in the final, 2–6, 7–5, 6–0, against Mahesh Bhupathi and Mark Knowles. Bhupathi was vying to complete the career Grand Slam.

== Seeds ==
1. (Canada) Daniel Nestor / (Serbia) Nenad Zimonjić (second round)
2. (United States) Bob Bryan / (United States) Mike Bryan (champions)
3. (India) Mahesh Bhupathi / (The Bahamas) Mark Knowles (final)
4. (Czech Republic) Lukáš Dlouhý / (India) Leander Paes (semifinals)
5. (South Africa) Jeff Coetzee / (South Africa) Wesley Moodie (second round)
6. (Poland) Mariusz Fyrstenberg / (Poland) Marcin Matkowski (quarterfinals)
7. (Brazil) Bruno Soares / (Zimbabwe) Kevin Ullyett (third round)
8. (Brazil) Marcelo Melo / (Brazil) André Sá (second round)
9. (Belarus) Max Mirnyi / (Israel) Andy Ram (second round)
10. (Sweden) Simon Aspelin / (Czech Republic) Pavel Vízner (first round)
11. (Czech Republic) Martin Damm / (Sweden) Robert Lindstedt (second round)
12. (France) Arnaud Clément / (France) Marc Gicquel (first round)
13. (Germany) Christopher Kas / (Netherlands) Rogier Wassen (second round)
14. (Czech Republic) František Čermák / (Slovakia) Michal Mertiňák (second round)
15. (United States) Travis Parrott / (Slovakia) Filip Polášek (second round)
16. (United States) Eric Butorac / (United Kingdom) Jamie Murray (first round)

== Draw ==
Key

- Q = Qualifier
- WC = Wild card
- LL = Lucky loser
- Alt = Alternate
- ITF = ITF entry
- PR = Protected ranking
- SR = Special ranking
- SE = Special exempt
- JE = Junior exempt
- JR = Junior Accelerator Programme entrant
- CO = College Accelerator Programme entrant
- NG = Next Gen Accelerator Program entrant
- w/o = Walkover
- r = Retired
- d = Defaulted

=== Finals ===
Quarterfinals
(Poland) Łukasz Kubot (Austria) Oliver Marach	6	6
6	(Poland) Mariusz Fyrstenberg (Poland) Marcin Matkowski	2	2
3	(India) Mahesh Bhupathi (The Bahamas) Mark Knowles	6	2	6
(Spain) Feliciano López (Spain) Fernando Verdasco	1	6	4
(Italy) Simone Bolelli (Italy) Andreas Seppi	1	6^{5}
4	(Czech Republic) Lukáš Dlouhý (India) Leander Paes	6	7
(United States) Mardy Fish (United States) John Isner	5	6^{6}
2	(United States) Bob Bryan (United States) Mike Bryan	7	7

Semifinals
(Poland) Łukasz Kubot (Austria) Oliver Marach	3	1
3	(India) Mahesh Bhupathi (The Bahamas) Mark Knowles	6	6
4	(Czech Republic) Lukáš Dlouhý (India) Leander Paes	3	3
2	(United States) Bob Bryan (United States) Mike Bryan	6	6

Final
3	(India) Mahesh Bhupathi (The Bahamas) Mark Knowles	6	5	0
2	(United States) Bob Bryan (United States) Mike Bryan	2	7	6

=== Top half ===
==== Section 1 ====
First round
1	(Canada) D Nestor (Serbia) N Zimonjić	6	6
(France) J Chardy (France) G Simon	3	2
(Chinese Taipei) Y-h Lu (Germany) R Schüttler	2	1
(Poland) Ł Kubot (Austria) O Marach	6	6
(United States) S Lipsky (United States) D Martin	6^{5}	6^{4}
WC	(Australia) C Ball (Australia) C Guccione	7	7
(South Africa) C Haggard (United States) S Querrey	4	5
13	(Germany) C Kas (Netherlands) R Wassen	6	7
10	(Sweden) S Aspelin (Czech Republic) P Vízner	1	6^{3}
(Romania) A Pavel (Romania) H Tecău	6	7
(Argentina) S Prieto (Argentina) M Vassallo Argüello	6	1	6^{4}
(Croatia) I Karlović (Switzerland) J-C Scherrer	1	6	7
(Argentina) A Calleri (Argentina) E Schwank	5	5
(Australia) S Huss (United Kingdom) R Hutchins	7	7
WC	(Australia) C Ebelthite (Australia) S Groth	7	6^{4}	4
6	(Poland) M Fyrstenberg (Poland) M Matkowski	5	7	6

Second round
1	(Canada) D Nestor (Serbia) N Zimonjić	5	4
(Poland) Ł Kubot (Austria) O Marach	7	6
WC	(Australia) C Ball (Australia) C Guccione	7	3	6
13	(Germany) C Kas (Netherlands) R Wassen	6^{3}	6	3
(Romania) A Pavel (Romania) H Tecău	6	7
(Croatia) I Karlović (Switzerland) J-C Scherrer	2	6^{1}
(Australia) S Huss (United Kingdom) R Hutchins	4	6	3
6	(Poland) M Fyrstenberg (Poland) M Matkowski	6	3	6

Third round
(Poland) Ł Kubot (Austria) O Marach	6	6
WC	(Australia) C Ball (Australia) C Guccione	2	4
(Romania) A Pavel (Romania) H Tecău	2	2
6	(Poland) M Fyrstenberg (Poland) M Matkowski	6	6

Quarterfinals
(Poland) Ł Kubot (Austria) O Marach	6	6
6	(Poland) M Fyrstenberg (Poland) M Matkowski	2	2

==== Section 2 ====
First round
3	(India) M Bhupathi (The Bahamas) M Knowles	6	6
(Russia) M Youzhny (Germany) M Zverev	3	2
(Russia) I Kunitsyn (Russia) D Tursunov	6	6
WC	(Australia) D Propoggia (Australia) M Reid	4	4
(Spain) M Granollers (Spain) S Ventura	6	4	1
(India) R Bopanna (Finland) J Nieminen	3	6	6
(Ecuador) N Lapentti (Spain) T Robredo	6	6
16	(United States) E Butorac (United Kingdom) J Murray	4	4
9	(Belarus) M Mirnyi (Israel) A Ram	6^{5}	6	7
WC	(Australia) G Jones (Australia) P Luczak	7	3	6^{8}
(Spain) F López (Spain) F Verdasco	7	3	7
(United States) J Cerretani (Italy) P Starace	6^{7}	6	5
(Argentina) L Arnold Ker (Argentina) J Mónaco	6	7
(Serbia) J Tipsarević (Serbia) V Troicki	3	6^{4}
WC	(Australia) M Ebden (Australia) B Klein	2	6^{5}
8	(Brazil) M Melo (Brazil) A Sá	6	7

Second round
3	(India) M Bhupathi (The Bahamas) M Knowles	7	7
(Russia) I Kunitsyn (Russia) D Tursunov	5	5
(India) R Bopanna (Finland) J Nieminen	4	4
(Ecuador) N Lapentti (Spain) T Robredo	6	6
9	(Belarus) M Mirnyi (Israel) A Ram	2	4
(Spain) F López (Spain) F Verdasco	6	6
(Argentina) L Arnold Ker (Argentina) J Mónaco	7	7
8	(Brazil) M Melo (Brazil) A Sá	6^{7}	6^{5}

Third round
3	(India) M Bhupathi (The Bahamas) M Knowles	6	6
(Ecuador) N Lapentti (Spain) T Robredo	3	4
(Spain) F López (Spain) F Verdasco	6	7
(Argentina) L Arnold Ker (Argentina) J Mónaco	2	5

Quarterfinals
3	(India) M Bhupathi (The Bahamas) M Knowles	6	2	6
(Spain) F López (Spain) F Verdasco	1	6	4

=== Bottom half ===
==== Section 3 ====
First round
5	(South Africa) J Coetzee (South Africa) W Moodie	6	6
(United States) R Ginepri (United States) V Spadea	4	3
WC	(Australia) A Coelho (Australia) J Sirianni	6^{5}	6	6
(Spain) G García-López (Romania) V Hănescu	7	1	4
(Italy) S Bolelli (Italy) A Seppi	7	7
(Germany) M Kohlmann (Belgium) K Vliegen	6^{5}	5
(Germany) P Petzschner (Austria) A Peya	7	7
12	(France) A Clément (France) M Gicquel	6^{3}	6^{11}
14	(Czech Republic) F Čermák (Slovakia) M Mertiňák	6	6
(Spain) N Almagro (Spain) I Navarro	2	4
(Spain) Ó Hernández (Spain) A Montañés	3	4
(Australia) P Hanley (Australia) J Kerr	6	6
(Italy) F Fognini (Croatia) I Ljubičić	6	6
(Belgium) S Darcis (Belgium) C Rochus	4	3
(Switzerland) Y Allegro (France) F Santoro	6	1	2
4	(Czech Republic) L Dlouhý (India) L Paes	4	6	6

Second round
5	(South Africa) J Coetzee (South Africa) W Moodie	1	5
WC	(Australia) A Coelho (Australia) J Sirianni	6	7
(Italy) S Bolelli (Italy) A Seppi	6	3	6
(Germany) P Petzschner (Austria) A Peya	3	6	4
14	(Czech Republic) F Čermák (Slovakia) M Mertiňák	3	6^{4}
(Australia) P Hanley (Australia) J Kerr	6	7
(Italy) F Fognini (Croatia) I Ljubičić	3	4
4	(Czech Republic) L Dlouhý (India) L Paes	6	6

Third round
WC	(Australia) A Coelho (Australia) J Sirianni	6	1	4
(Italy) S Bolelli (Italy) A Seppi	3	6	6
(Australia) P Hanley (Australia) J Kerr	2	5
4	(Czech Republic) L Dlouhý (India) L Paes	6	7

Quarterfinals
(Italy) S Bolelli (Italy) A Seppi	1	6^{5}
4	(Czech Republic) L Dlouhý (India) L Paes	6	7

==== Section 4 ====
First round
7	(Brazil) B Soares (Zimbabwe) K Ullyett	6	6
(France) J Benneteau (France) F Serra	3	0
(South Africa) R de Voest (Australia) A Fisher	6	6
(France) N Devilder (France) P-H Mathieu	3	2
(Austria) J Knowle (Austria) J Melzer	6^{5}	6^{6}
(United States) M Fish (United States) J Isner	7	7
(Spain) D Ferrer (Spain) D Gimeno-Traver	6	3	4
11	(Czech Republic) M Damm (Sweden) R Lindstedt	2	6	6
15	(United States) T Parrott (Slovakia) F Polášek	6	6
(Russia) I Andreev (Ukraine) S Stakhovsky	3	4
(United States) R Ram (United States) B Reynolds	4	6	6
(Serbia) D Vemić (Croatia) L Zovko	6	4	2
(Argentina) G Cañas (Russia) M Safin	4	1
WC	(Australia) A Feeney (Australia) R Smeets	6	6
(Chile) F González (Argentina) M Hood	5	3
2	(United States) B Bryan (United States) M Bryan	7	6

Second round
7	(Brazil) B Soares (Zimbabwe) K Ullyett	7	7
(South Africa) R de Voest (Australia) A Fisher	6^{7}	6^{6}
(United States) M Fish (United States) J Isner	6	3	6
11	(Czech Republic) M Damm (Sweden) R Lindstedt	4	6	3
15	(United States) T Parrott (Slovakia) F Polášek	6^{5}	6	4
(United States) R Ram (United States) B Reynolds	7	4	6
WC	(Australia) A Feeney (Australia) R Smeets	3	1
2	(United States) B Bryan (United States) M Bryan	6	6

Third round
7	(Brazil) B Soares (Zimbabwe) K Ullyett	2	6^{7}
(United States) M Fish (United States) J Isner	6	7
(United States) R Ram (United States) B Reynolds	3	7	3
2	(United States) B Bryan (United States) M Bryan	6	6^{5}	6

Quarterfinals
(United States) M Fish (United States) J Isner	5	6^{6}
2	(United States) B Bryan (United States) M Bryan	7	7
