= 2009 Australian Open – Women's doubles =

Women's doubles

Women's doubles
- 2009 Australian Open

Final
- Champions: (United States) Serena Williams (United States) Venus Williams
- Runners-up: (Slovakia) Daniela Hantuchová (Japan) Ai Sugiyama
- Score: 6–3, 6–3

Details
- Draw: 64
- Seeds: 16

Events
Singles	men	women		boys	girls
Doubles	men	women	mixed	boys	girls
WC Singles	men	women	quad
WC Doubles	men	women	quad
Legends	men	women	mixed
- Australian Open

Serena and Venus Williams defeated Daniela Hantuchová and Ai Sugiyama in the final, 6–3, 6–3 to win the women's doubles tennis title at the 2009 Australian Open. It was their third Australian Open doubles title together and eighth major title together overall.

Alona Bondarenko and Kateryna Bondarenko were the defending champions, but were defeated in the first round by Gisela Dulko and Roberta Vinci.

== Seeds ==
1. (Zimbabwe) Cara Black / (United States) Liezel Huber (quarterfinals)
2. (Spain) Anabel Medina Garrigues / (Spain) Virginia Ruano Pascual (third round)
3. (Czech Republic) Květa Peschke / (United States) Lisa Raymond (third round)
4. (Ukraine) Alona Bondarenko / (Ukraine) Kateryna Bondarenko (first round)
5. (Australia) Samantha Stosur / (Australia) Rennae Stubbs (third round)
6. (China) Yan Zi / (China) Zheng Jie (third round)
7. (Russia) Maria Kirilenko / (Italy) Flavia Pennetta (third round, withdrew)
8. (Chinese Taipei) Chuang Chia-jung / (China) Sun Tiantian (first round)
9. (Slovakia) Daniela Hantuchová / (Japan) Ai Sugiyama (final)
10. (United States) Serena Williams / (United States) Venus Williams (champions)
11. (Spain) Nuria Llagostera Vives / (Spain) María José Martínez Sánchez (quarterfinals)
12. (Australia) Casey Dellacqua / (Italy) Francesca Schiavone (semifinals)
13. (Belarus) Victoria Azarenka / (Russia) Vera Zvonareva (third round, withdrew)
14. (Romania) Sorana Cîrstea / (Romania) Monica Niculescu (second round)
15. (Belarus) Tatiana Poutchek / (Russia) Anastasia Rodionova (second round)
16. (Chinese Taipei) Hsieh Su-wei / (China) Peng Shuai (quarterfinals)

== Draw ==
Key

- Q = Qualifier
- WC = Wild card
- LL = Lucky loser
- Alt = Alternate
- ITF = ITF entry
- PR = Protected ranking
- SR = Special ranking
- SE = Special exempt
- JE = Junior exempt
- JR = Junior Accelerator Programme entrant
- CO = College Accelerator Programme entrant
- NG = Next Gen Accelerator Program entrant
- w/o = Walkover
- r = Retired
- d = Defaulted

=== Finals ===
Quarterfinals
1	(Zimbabwe) Cara Black (United States) Liezel Huber	7	3	6^{10}
9	(Slovakia) Daniela Hantuchová (Japan) Ai Sugiyama	6^{0}	6	7
(France) Nathalie Dechy (Italy) Mara Santangelo	3	7	7
11	(Spain) Nuria Llagostera Vives (Spain) María José Martínez Sánchez	6	6^{7}	6^{6}
12	(Australia) Casey Dellacqua (Italy) Francesca Schiavone	0	7	6
(Germany) Anna-Lena Grönefeld (Switzerland) Patty Schnyder	6	5	1
10	(United States) Serena Williams (United States) Venus Williams	6	4	6
16	(Chinese Taipei) Hsieh Su-wei (China) Peng Shuai	2	6	3

Semifinals
9	(Slovakia) Daniela Hantuchová (Japan) Ai Sugiyama	6	6
(France) Nathalie Dechy (Italy) Mara Santangelo	4	3
12	(Australia) Casey Dellacqua (Italy) Francesca Schiavone	0	2
10	(United States) Serena Williams (United States) Venus Williams	6	6

Final
9	(Slovakia) Daniela Hantuchová (Japan) Ai Sugiyama	3	3
10	(United States) Serena Williams (United States) Venus Williams	6	6

=== Top half ===
==== Section 1 ====
First round
1	(Zimbabwe) C Black (United States) L Huber	6	6
(Russia) A Chakvetadze (Russia) A Kleybanova	2	3
WC	(Australia) M Adamczak (Australia) O Rogowska	7	2	4
(Romania) E Gallovits (Spain) A Parra Santonja	5	6	6
WC	(Australia) N Kriz (Australia) A Wishink	1	2
(France) A Cornet (France) C Pin	6	6
WC	(Australia) B Sheed (Australia) B Stewart	2	1
13	(Belarus) V Azarenka (Russia) V Zvonareva	6	6
9	(Slovakia) D Hantuchová (Japan) A Sugiyama	6	6
WC	(Australia) I Holland (Australia) S Peers	1	1
(Russia) V Dushevina (Ukraine) O Savchuk	4	6	6
(United States) V King (India) S Mirza	6	1	1
(Czech Republic) I Benešová (Czech Republic) B Záhlavová-Strýcová	6	6
(Chinese Taipei) Y-j Chan (Russia) A Pavlyuchenkova	4	4
(Hungary) Á Szávay (Russia) E Vesnina	3	6	6
8	(Chinese Taipei) C-j Chuang (China) T Sun	6	3	4

Second round
1	(Zimbabwe) C Black (United States) L Huber	6	6
(Romania) E Gallovits (Spain) A Parra Santonja	1	2
(France) A Cornet (France) C Pin	3	0
13	(Belarus) V Azarenka (Russia) V Zvonareva	6	6
9	(Slovakia) D Hantuchová (Japan) A Sugiyama	6	6
(Russia) V Dushevina (Ukraine) O Savchuk	4	1
(Czech Republic) I Benešová (Czech Republic) B Záhlavová-Strýcová	6	4	3
(Hungary) Á Szávay (Russia) E Vesnina	4	6	6

Third round
1	(Zimbabwe) C Black (United States) L Huber	w/o
13	(Belarus) V Azarenka (Russia) V Zvonareva
9	(Slovakia) D Hantuchová (Japan) A Sugiyama	6	6
(Hungary) Á Szávay (Russia) E Vesnina	1	2

Quarterfinals
1	(Zimbabwe) C Black (United States) L Huber	7	3	6^{10}
9	(Slovakia) D Hantuchová (Japan) A Sugiyama	6^{0}	6	7

==== Section 2 ====
First round
3	(Czech Republic) K Peschke (United States) L Raymond	7	6
(Italy) S Errani (Italy) K Knapp	6^{0}	3
WC	(Australia) A Bai (Australia) E Starr	5	2
(Sweden) S Arvidsson (South Africa) N Grandin	7	6
(France) S Brémond (Belarus) O Govortsova	1	0
(France) N Dechy (Italy) M Santangelo	6	6
(United States) J Ditty (United States) C Gullickson	3	6	3
14	(Romania) S Cîrstea (Romania) M Niculescu	6	2	6
11	(Spain) N Llagostera Vives (Spain) MJ Martínez Sánchez	6	6
WC	(Australia) T Calderwood (Australia) S Golds	1	1
(France) M Johansson (Tunisia) S Sfar	4	3
(Uzbekistan) A Amanmuradova (Bulgaria) T Pironkova	6	6
(Austria) T Paszek (Turkey) İ Şenoğlu	2	1	r
(Poland) K Jans (Poland) A Rosolska	6	2
(Czech Republic) E Hrdinová (Czech Republic) K Zakopalová	1	4
6	(China) Z Yan (China) J Zheng	6	6

Second round
3	(Czech Republic) K Peschke (United States) L Raymond	6	6
(Sweden) S Arvidsson (South Africa) N Grandin	2	4
(France) N Dechy (Italy) M Santangelo	6	6
14	(Romania) S Cîrstea (Romania) M Niculescu	3	3
11	(Spain) N Llagostera Vives (Spain) MJ Martínez Sánchez	6	6
(Uzbekistan) A Amanmuradova (Bulgaria) T Pironkova	4	2
(Poland) K Jans (Poland) A Rosolska	2	2
6	(China) Z Yan (China) J Zheng	6	6

Third round
3	(Czech Republic) K Peschke (United States) L Raymond	5	3
(France) N Dechy (Italy) M Santangelo	7	6
11	(Spain) N Llagostera Vives (Spain) MJ Martínez Sánchez	7	6
6	(China) Z Yan (China) J Zheng	5	4

Quarterfinals
(France) N Dechy (Italy) M Santangelo	3	7	7
11	(Spain) N Llagostera Vives (Spain) MJ Martínez Sánchez	6	6^{7}	6^{6}

=== Bottom half ===
==== Section 3 ====
First round
7	(Russia) M Kirilenko (Italy) F Pennetta	3	6	6
(Latvia) L Dekmeijere (Canada) A Wozniak	6	2	1
WC	(Australia) S Ferguson (Australia) J Moore	3	2
(Bosnia and Herzegovina) M Jugić-Salkić (United Kingdom) A Keothavong	6	6
(Israel) S Pe'er (Denmark) C Wozniacki	2	3
(Russia) A Kudryavtseva (Russia) E Makarova	6	6
(Czech Republic) P Cetkovská (Spain) C Suárez Navarro	2	1
12	(Australia) C Dellacqua (Italy) F Schiavone	6	6
15	(Belarus) T Poutchek (Russia) A Rodionova	6	6
(Poland) M Domachowska (Belgium) Y Wickmayer	1	1
(Germany) A-L Grönefeld (Switzerland) P Schnyder	6	6
(Germany) K Barrois (Italy) T Garbin	2	1
(New Zealand) M Erakovic (Croatia) J Kostanić Tošić	2	2
(Czech Republic) L Šafářová (Kazakhstan) G Voskoboeva	6	6
(Argentina) G Dulko (Italy) R Vinci	6	7
4	(Ukraine) A Bondarenko (Ukraine) K Bondarenko	2	5

Second round
7	(Russia) M Kirilenko (Italy) F Pennetta	6	6
(Bosnia and Herzegovina) M Jugić-Salkić (United Kingdom) A Keothavong	1	2
(Russia) A Kudryavtseva (Russia) E Makarova	4	3
12	(Australia) C Dellacqua (Italy) F Schiavone	6	6
15	(Belarus) T Poutchek (Russia) A Rodionova	7	3	0
(Germany) A-L Grönefeld (Switzerland) P Schnyder	5	6	6
(Czech Republic) L Šafářová (Kazakhstan) G Voskoboeva	6	6
(Argentina) G Dulko (Italy) R Vinci	2	4

Third round
7	(Russia) M Kirilenko (Italy) F Pennetta
12	(Australia) C Dellacqua (Italy) F Schiavone	w/o
(Germany) A-L Grönefeld (Switzerland) P Schnyder	6	6^{5}	6
(Czech Republic) L Šafářová (Kazakhstan) G Voskoboeva	4	7	3

Quarterfinals
12	(Australia) C Dellacqua (Italy) F Schiavone	0	7	6
(Germany) A-L Grönefeld (Switzerland) P Schnyder	6	5	1

==== Section 4 ====
First round
5	(Australia) S Stosur (Australia) R Stubbs	6	6
(Slovakia) J Gajdošová (Estonia) K Kanepi	1	4
(United States) J Craybas (Thailand) T Tanasugarn	3	5
(Poland) A Radwańska (Poland) U Radwańska	6	7
(Czech Republic) P Kvitová (Slovakia) M Rybáriková	4	6^{5}
Alt	(Japan) A Morita (Germany) M Müller	6	7
(Russia) S Kuznetsova (Russia) N Petrova	3	1
10	(United States) S Williams (United States) V Williams	6	6
16	(Chinese Taipei) S-w Hsieh (China) S Peng	6	2	6
(Estonia) M Ani (Czech Republic) R Voráčová	1	6	4
(Belarus) E Dzehalevich (Czech Republic) V Uhlířová	3	5
(Czech Republic) A Hlaváčková (Czech Republic) L Hradecká	6	7
(Ukraine) M Koryttseva (Kazakhstan) Y Shvedova	6	2
(United States) R Kops-Jones (United States) A Spears	7	6
(Slovakia) D Cibulková (France) V Razzano	1	3
2	(Spain) A Medina Garrigues (Spain) V Ruano Pascual	6	6

Second round
5	(Australia) S Stosur (Australia) R Stubbs	6	6
(Poland) A Radwańska (Poland) U Radwańska	1	4
Alt	(Japan) A Morita (Germany) M Müller	3	3
10	(United States) S Williams (United States) V Williams	6	6
16	(Chinese Taipei) S-w Hsieh (China) S Peng	6	6^{1}	6
(Czech Republic) A Hlaváčková (Czech Republic) L Hradecká	4	7	3
(United States) R Kops-Jones (United States) A Spears	2	7	3
2	(Spain) A Medina Garrigues (Spain) V Ruano Pascual	6	6^{6}	6

Third round
5	(Australia) S Stosur (Australia) R Stubbs	4	2
10	(United States) S Williams (United States) V Williams	6	6
16	(Chinese Taipei) S-w Hsieh (China) S Peng	6	6
2	(Spain) A Medina Garrigues (Spain) V Ruano Pascual	0	1

Quarterfinals
10	(United States) S Williams (United States) V Williams	6	4	6
16	(Chinese Taipei) S-w Hsieh (China) S Peng	2	6	3
