= 2009 Australian Open – Boys' singles =

Boys' singles
- 2009 Australian Open

Final
- Champion: (India) Yuki Bhambri
- Runner-up: (Germany) Alexandros Georgoudas
- Score: 6–3, 6–1

Events
Singles	men	women		boys	girls
Doubles	men	women	mixed	boys	girls
WC Singles	men	women	quad
WC Doubles	men	women	quad
Legends	men	women	mixed
- Australian Open

In the boys' singles tournament of the 2009 Australian Open, Yuki Bhambri won in the final 6–3, 6–1, against Alexandros Georgoudas.

Bernard Tomic was the defending champion, but chose to compete in the men's singles this year.

== Seeds ==
1. (India) Yuki Bhambri (champion)
2. (Guatemala) Julen Urigüen (semifinals)
3. (Croatia) Marin Draganja (first round)
4. (Spain) Pablo Carreño-Busta (first round)
5. (France) Julien Obry (quarterfinals)
6. (Australia) James Duckworth (third round)
7. (France) Adrien Puget (semifinals)
8. (Chinese Taipei) Huang Liang-chi (first round)
9. (Japan) Hiroyasu Ehara (first round)
10. (Philippines) Francis Casey Alcantara (first round)
11. (Spain) Carlos Boluda-Purkiss (second round)
12. (South Africa) Nikala Scholtz (first round)
13. (Croatia) Dino Marcan (third round)
14. (Japan) Shuichi Sekiguchi (second round)
15. (Chinese Taipei) Hsieh Cheng-peng (quarterfinals)
16. (Egypt) Karim-Mohamed Maamoun (first round)

== Draw ==
Key

- Q = Qualifier
- WC = Wild card
- LL = Lucky loser
- Alt = Alternate
- ITF = ITF entry
- PR = Protected ranking
- SR = Special ranking
- SE = Special exempt
- JE = Junior exempt
- JR = Junior Accelerator Programme entrant
- CO = College Accelerator Programme entrant
- NG = Next Gen Accelerator Program entrant
- w/o = Walkover
- r = Retired
- d = Defaulted

=== Finals ===
Quarterfinals
1	(India) Yuki Bhambri	6	7
(Germany) Richard Becker	1	5
(Russia) Mikhail Biryukov	4	2
7	(France) Adrien Puget	6	6
(Germany) Alexandros Georgoudas	7	4	6
15	(Chinese Taipei) Hsieh Cheng-peng	6^{8}	6	4
5	(France) Julien Obry	4	0
2	(Guatemala) Julen Urigüen	6	6

Semifinals
1	(India) Yuki Bhambri	6	6
7	(France) Adrien Puget	4	4
(Germany) Alexandros Georgoudas	6	6
2	(Guatemala) Julen Urigüen	4	4

Final
1	(India) Yuki Bhambri	6	6
(Germany) Alexandros Georgoudas	3	1

=== Top half ===
==== Section 1 ====
First round
1	(India) Y Bhambri	4	6	8
Q	(Mexico) Germán Sánchez Delfín	6	1	6
(United States) Harry Fowler	6	3	2
WC	(Australia) Stephen Hoh	4	6	6
WC	(Australia) L Saville	6	6
(Belarus) Vladzimir Kruk	2	1
(Hong Kong) Dino Dell'orto	1	3
13	(Croatia) D Marcan	6	6
12	(South Africa) N Scholtz	3	6
Q	(Japan) Y Uchiyama	6	7
(Australia) Nat Maraga	5	5
Q	(Austria) M Neuchrist	7	7
Q	(South Korea) Na Jung-woong	2	6	9
WC	(Australia) Todd Volmari	6	3	7
(Germany) R Becker	4	6	6
8	(Chinese Taipei) L-c Huang	6	2	4

Second round
1	(India) Y Bhambri	7	6
WC	(Australia) S Hoh	6	0
WC	(Australia) L Saville	3	6	2
13	(Croatia) D Marcan	6	3	6
Q	(Japan) Y Uchiyama	6	6
Q	(Austria) M Neuchrist	3	3
Q	(South Korea) J-w Na	4	2
(Germany) R Becker	6	6

Third round
1	(India) Y Bhambri	6	6
13	(Croatia) D Marcan	3	1
Q	(Japan) Y Uchiyama	7	4	3
(Germany) R Becker	6^{8}	6	6

Quarterfinals
1	(India) Y Bhambri	6	7
(Germany) R Becker	1	5

==== Section 2 ====
First round
4	(Spain) P Carreño-Busta	4	4
(Russia) M Biryukov	6	6
WC	(Australia) Joey Swaysland	4	3
(Germany) K Krawietz	6	6
(Australia) Alex Sanders	7	7
Q	(Republic of Ireland) John Morrissey	5	6
(Portugal) Miguel Almeida	7	6
16	(Egypt) K-M Maamoun	5	3
9	(Japan) Hiroyasu Ehara	7	3	4
(Netherlands) J Eleveld	6	6	6
(Sweden) P Brydolf	4	2
(India) Kaza Vinayak Sharma	6	6
(New Zealand) Ben McLachlan	2	4
(Finland) H Laaksonen	6	6
(Australia) Jarryd Chaplin	1	2
7	(France) Adrien Puget	6	6

Second round
(Russia) M Biryukov	6	6
(Germany) K Krawietz	2	4
(Australia) A Sanders	6	2	1
(Portugal) M Almeida	2	6	6
(Netherlands) J Eleveld	6	6
(India) KV Sharma	1	1
(Finland) H Laaksonen	6	2	5
7	(France) A Puget	4	6	7

Third round
(Russia) M Biryukov	6	6
(Portugal) M Almeida	2	2
(Netherlands) J Eleveld	3	4
7	(France) A Puget	6	6

Quarterfinals
(Russia) M Biryukov	4	2
7	(France) A Puget	6	6

=== Bottom half ===
==== Section 3 ====
First round
6	(Australia) J Duckworth	7	6
(Austria) T-S Weissborn	5	2
(Brazil) Gabriel Dias	7	6
(South Africa) Grant Ive	6	2
WC	(Australia) A Whittington	3	1
(Germany) Alexandros Georgoudas	6	6
(Zimbabwe) Mbonisi Ndimande	2	1
11	(Spain) Carlos Boluda-Purkiss	6	6
15	(Chinese Taipei) C-p Hsieh	6	2	6
Q	(United Kingdom) James Chaudry	1	6	3
WC	(Australia) Andrew McLeod	6	4	4
(New Zealand) Riki McLachlan	4	6	6
(France) P-H Herbert	6	6
(India) Sudarwa Sitaram	3	4
(Australia) Mark Verryth	7	6
3	(Croatia) M Draganja	6	4

Second round
6	(Australia) J Duckworth	6	6
(Brazil) G Dias	4	1
(Germany) A Georgoudas	6	5	7
11	(Spain) C Boluda-Purkiss	3	7	5
15	(Chinese Taipei) C-p Hsieh	6	6
(New Zealand) R McLachlan	3	1
(France) P-H Herbert	6	4
(Australia) M Verryth	7	6

Third round
6	(Australia) J Duckworth	4	4
(Germany) A Georgoudas	6	6
15	(Chinese Taipei) C-p Hsieh	6	7
(Australia) M Verryth	4	5

Quarterfinals
(Germany) A Georgoudas	7	4	6
15	(Chinese Taipei) C-p Hsieh	6^{8}	6	4

==== Section 4 ====
First round
5	(France) Julien Obry	6	6
(Australia) David Sofaer	4	3
(Italy) Federico Gaio	6	3	6
(Belarus) A Vasilevski	4	6	3
WC	(Australia) J Kubler	1	1
(Germany) Dominik Schulz	6	6
(Sweden) D Berta	6	6
10	(Philippines) FC Alcantara	3	4
14	(Japan) Shuichi Sekiguchi	6	6
(New Zealand) Jordan Kelly-Houston	2	1
Q	(Australia) Jordan Szabo	7	1	13
(India) Ronak Manuja	6	6	11
(Germany) Marko Krickovic	6	6
WC	(Australia) Jack Schipanski	4	3
Q	(Croatia) T Androić	5	4
2	(Guatemala) J Urigüen	7	6

Second round
5	(France) J Obry	7	6
(Italy) F Gaio	5	4
(Germany) D Schulz	2	3
(Sweden) D Berta	6	6
14	(Japan) S Sekiguchi	6	7	4
Q	(Australia) J Szabo	7	5	6
(Germany) M Krickovic	6	6	4
2	(Guatemala) J Urigüen	7	3	6

Third round
5	(France) J Obry	4	7	6
(Sweden) D Berta	6	6^{6}	4
Q	(Australia) J Szabo	2	4
2	(Guatemala) J Urigüen	6	6

Quarterfinals
5	(France) J Obry	4	0
2	(Guatemala) J Urigüen	6	6
