= 2009 Australian Open – Women's singles =

Women's singles
- 2009 Australian Open

Final
- Champion: (United States) Serena Williams
- Runner-up: (Russia) Dinara Safina
- Score: 6–0, 6–3

Details
- Draw: 128 (12Q / 8WC)
- Seeds: 32

Events
Singles	men	women		boys	girls
Doubles	men	women	mixed	boys	girls
WC Singles	men	women	quad
WC Doubles	men	women	quad
Legends	men	women	mixed
- Australian Open

Serena Williams defeated Dinara Safina in the final, 6–0, 6–3 to win the women's singles tennis title at the 2009 Australian Open. It was her fourth Australian Open singles title and tenth major singles title overall. With the win, Williams regained the world No. 1 ranking.

Maria Sharapova was the reigning champion, but withdrew from the tournament due to a recurring shoulder injury.

This was also the first Australian Open to feature three Russian semifinalists, those being Safina, Vera Zvonareva and Elena Dementieva.

== Seeds ==
1. (Serbia) Jelena Janković (fourth round)
2. (United States) Serena Williams (champion)
3. (Russia) Dinara Safina (final)
4. (Russia) Elena Dementieva (semifinals)
5. (Serbia) Ana Ivanovic (third round)
6. (United States) Venus Williams (second round)
7. (Russia) Vera Zvonareva (semifinals)
8. (Russia) Svetlana Kuznetsova (quarterfinals)
9. (Poland) Agnieszka Radwańska (first round)
10. (Russia) Nadia Petrova (fourth round)
11. (Denmark) Caroline Wozniacki (third round)
12. (Italy) Flavia Pennetta (third round)
13. (Belarus) Victoria Azarenka (fourth round, retired due to dizziness and gastrointestinal illness)
14. (Switzerland) Patty Schnyder (second round)
15. (France) Alizé Cornet (fourth round)
16. (France) Marion Bartoli (quarterfinals)

17. (Russia) Anna Chakvetadze (second round)
18. (Slovakia) Dominika Cibulková (fourth round)
19. (Slovakia) Daniela Hantuchová (third round)
20. (France) Amélie Mauresmo (third round)
21. (Spain) Anabel Medina Garrigues (fourth round)
22. (China) Zheng Jie (fourth round, retired due to a left wrist sprain)
23. (Hungary) Ágnes Szávay (first round)
24. (Austria) Sybille Bammer (first round)
25. (Estonia) Kaia Kanepi (third round)
26. (Japan) Ai Sugiyama (third round)
27. (Russia) Maria Kirilenko (first round)
28. (Italy) Francesca Schiavone (first round)
29. (Russia) Alisa Kleybanova (fourth round)
30. (Canada) Aleksandra Wozniak (first round)
31. (Ukraine) Alona Bondarenko (third round)
32. (Thailand) Tamarine Tanasugarn (first round)

Click on the seed number of a player to go to their draw section.

== Draw ==
Key

- Q = Qualifier
- WC = Wild card
- LL = Lucky loser
- Alt = Alternate
- ITF = ITF entry
- PR = Protected ranking
- SR = Special ranking
- SE = Special exempt
- JE = Junior exempt
- JR = Junior Accelerator Programme entrant
- CO = College Accelerator Programme entrant
- NG = Next Gen Accelerator Program entrant
- w/o = Walkover
- r = Retired
- d = Defaulted

=== Finals ===
Quarterfinals
16	(France) Marion Bartoli	3	0
7	(Russia) Vera Zvonareva	6	6
3	(Russia) Dinara Safina	6	4	6
WC	(Australia) Jelena Dokić	4	6	4
(Spain) Carla Suárez Navarro	2	2
4	(Russia) Elena Dementieva	6	6
8	(Russia) Svetlana Kuznetsova	7	5	1
2	(United States) Serena Williams	5	7	6

Semifinals
7	(Russia) Vera Zvonareva	3	6^{4}
3	(Russia) Dinara Safina	6	7^{7}
4	(Russia) Elena Dementieva	3	4
2	(United States) Serena Williams	6	6

Final
3	(Russia) Dinara Safina	0	3
2	(United States) Serena Williams	6	6

=== Top half ===
==== Section 1 ====
First round
1	(Serbia) J Janković	6	6
(Austria) Y Meusburger	1	3
(Belgium) K Flipkens	6	6
(Paraguay) R de los Ríos	3	2
(France) N Dechy	6	6
Q	(Ukraine) V Kutuzova	3	0
Q	(Canada) S Dubois	0	6^{5}
26	(Japan) A Sugiyama	6	7^{7}
24	(Austria) S Bammer	3	1
(Czech Republic) L Šafářová	6	6
(Czech Republic) P Cetkovská	4	5
(New Zealand) M Erakovic	6	7
Q	(Croatia) K Šprem	0	4
(Bulgaria) T Pironkova	6	6
(United Kingdom) M South	2	4
16	(France) M Bartoli	6	6

Second round
1	(Serbia) J Janković	6	7
(Belgium) K Flipkens	4	5
(France) N Dechy	6	1	3
26	(Japan) A Sugiyama	1	6	6
(Czech Republic) L Šafářová	6	3	9
(New Zealand) M Erakovic	1	6	7
(Bulgaria) T Pironkova	5	2
16	(France) M Bartoli	7	6

Third round
1	(Serbia) J Janković	6	6
26	(Japan) A Sugiyama	4	4
(Czech Republic) L Šafářová	6	2	1
16	(France) M Bartoli	3	6	6

Fourth round
1	(Serbia) J Janković	1	4
16	(France) M Bartoli	6	6

==== Section 2 ====
First round
10	(Russia) N Petrova	6	7^{7}
(Kazakhstan) Y Shvedova	3	6^{3}
(India) S Mirza	6	6
(Poland) M Domachowska	1	4
(Italy) K Knapp	7^{8}	6
WC	(Australia) M Wejnert	6^{6}	4
(Kazakhstan) G Voskoboeva	6	3	6
23	(Hungary) Á Szávay	3	6	4
27	(Russia) M Kirilenko	0	4
(Italy) S Errani	6	6
(Romania) M Niculescu	6	6
Q	(United Kingdom) K O'Brien	4	4
(Italy) ME Camerin	3	6	3
(Romania) E Gallovits	6	2	6
(Slovakia) M Rybáriková	6^{2}	0
7	(Russia) V Zvonareva	7^{7}	6

Second round
10	(Russia) N Petrova	6	6
(India) S Mirza	3	2
(Italy) K Knapp	4	1
(Kazakhstan) G Voskoboeva	6	6
(Italy) S Errani	6	6
(Romania) M Niculescu	2	3
(Romania) E Gallovits	0	0
7	(Russia) V Zvonareva	6	6

Third round
10	(Russia) N Petrova	6	0
(Kazakhstan) G Voskoboeva	1	0^{r}
(Italy) S Errani	4	1
7	(Russia) V Zvonareva	6	6

Fourth round
10	(Russia) N Petrova	5	4
7	(Russia) V Zvonareva	7	6

==== Section 3 ====
First round
3	(Russia) D Safina	6	6
(Russia) A Kudryavtseva	3	4
(Russia) E Makarova	1	7	6
(France) A Rezaï	6	5	4
Q	(Germany) J Schruff	4	1
(Austria) P Mayr	6	6
Q	(Japan) K Date-Krumm	4	6	6
25	(Estonia) K Kanepi	6	4	8
19	(Slovakia) D Hantuchová	7^{13}	6
(Australia) C Dellacqua	6^{11}	4
(United States) J Craybas	2	6	5
(France) M Johansson	6	1	7
PR	(Germany) A Petkovic	5	7^{7}	4
Q	(Germany) K Wörle	7	6^{0}	0^{r}
(Ukraine) M Koryttseva	3	4
15	(France) A Cornet	6	6

Second round
3	(Russia) D Safina	6^{3}	6	6
(Russia) E Makarova	7^{7}	3	0
(Austria) P Mayr	3	1
25	(Estonia) K Kanepi	6	6
19	(Slovakia) D Hantuchová	6	4	6
(France) M Johansson	3	6	3
PR	(Germany) A Petkovic	1	0
15	(France) A Cornet	6	6

Third round
3	(Russia) D Safina	6	6
25	(Estonia) K Kanepi	2	2
19	(Slovakia) D Hantuchová	6	4	2
15	(France) A Cornet	4	6	6

Fourth round
3	(Russia) D Safina	6	2	7
15	(France) A Cornet	2	6	5

==== Section 4 ====
First round
11	(Denmark) C Wozniacki	6	6
(Israel) S Pe'er	3	2
(Spain) V Ruano Pascual	6	6
(Colombia) M Duque Marino	3	2
WC	(Australia) J Dokić	6	3	6
(Austria) T Paszek	2	6	4
(United Kingdom) A Keothavong	1	7^{7}	1
17	(Russia) A Chakvetadze	6	6^{4}	6
29	(Russia) A Kleybanova	7	7
(Sweden) S Arvidsson	5	5
(France) S Cohen-Aloro	6	6
(Czech Republic) B Záhlavová-Strýcová	3	4
(Belgium) Y Wickmayer	4	2
Q	(Italy) A Brianti	6	6
(Germany) J Görges	5	3
5	(Serbia) A Ivanovic	7	6

Second round
11	(Denmark) C Wozniacki	6	6
(Spain) V Ruano Pascual	3	3
WC	(Australia) J Dokić	6	6^{4}	6
17	(Russia) A Chakvetadze	4	7^{7}	3
29	(Russia) A Kleybanova	6	3	6
(France) S Cohen-Aloro	1	6	2
Q	(Italy) A Brianti	3	2
5	(Serbia) A Ivanovic	6	6

Third round
11	(Denmark) C Wozniacki	6	1	2
WC	(Australia) J Dokić	3	6	6
29	(Russia) A Kleybanova	7	6^{5}	6
5	(Serbia) A Ivanovic	5	7^{7}	2

Fourth round
WC	(Australia) J Dokić	7	5	8
29	(Russia) A Kleybanova	5	7	6

=== Bottom half ===
==== Section 5 ====
First round
6	(United States) V Williams	6	6
(Germany) A Kerber	3	3
(Spain) C Suárez Navarro	7	6
(Italy) R Vinci	5	4
Q	(United States) M Oudin	1	4
(Uzbekistan) A Amanmuradova	6	6
(Spain) MJ Martínez Sánchez	7	6
32	(Thailand) T Tanasugarn	5	3
21	(Spain) A Medina Garrigues	6	7
WC	(Australia) I Holland	1	5
(Russia) E Vesnina	4	6	1
(France) J Coin	6	4	6
WC	(Australia) J Moore	1	6	9
WC	(United States) C McHale	6	3	7
PR	(Italy) M Santangelo	2	7	2
12	(Italy) F Pennetta	6	5	6

Second round
6	(United States) V Williams	6	3	5
(Spain) C Suárez Navarro	2	6	7
(Uzbekistan) A Amanmuradova	2	4
(Spain) MJ Martínez Sánchez	6	6
21	(Spain) A Medina Garrigues	6	6
(France) J Coin	1	4
WC	(Australia) J Moore	4	1
12	(Italy) F Pennetta	6	6

Third round
(Spain) C Suárez Navarro	6	6
(Spain) MJ Martínez Sánchez	1	4
21	(Spain) A Medina Garrigues	6	6
12	(Italy) F Pennetta	4	1

Fourth round
(Spain) C Suárez Navarro	6	6
21	(Spain) A Medina Garrigues	3	2

==== Section 6 ====
First round
14	(Switzerland) P Schnyder	2	6	6
WC	(France) K Mladenovic	6	4	2
(Australia) J Gajdošová	1	7^{7}	4
(France) V Razzano	6	6^{2}	6
(Chinese Taipei) S-w Hsieh	3	3
(Chinese Taipei) Y-j Chan	6	6
Q	(South Africa) C Scheepers	0	0
18	(Slovakia) D Cibulková	6	6
30	(Canada) A Wozniak	4	3
(Germany) S Lisicki	6	6
(Australia) S Stosur	7^{7}	7^{7}
(Czech Republic) K Zakopalová	6^{5}	6^{0}
(Russia) V Dushevina	4	6	2
(Czech Republic) I Benešová	6	0	6
(Germany) K Barrois	6^{4}	6	1
4	(Russia) E Dementieva	7^{7}	2	6

Second round
14	(Switzerland) P Schnyder	3	1
(France) V Razzano	6	6
(Chinese Taipei) Y-j Chan	0	2
18	(Slovakia) D Cibulková	6	6
(Germany) S Lisicki	3	4
(Australia) S Stosur	6	6
(Czech Republic) I Benešová	4	1
4	(Russia) E Dementieva	6	6

Third round
(France) V Razzano	5	5
18	(Slovakia) D Cibulková	7	7
(Australia) S Stosur	6^{6}	4
4	(Russia) E Dementieva	7^{7}	6

Fourth round
18	(Slovakia) D Cibulková	2	2
4	(Russia) E Dementieva	6	6

==== Section 7 ====
First round
8	(Russia) S Kuznetsova	6	3	6
(Australia) An Rodionova	2	6	3
PR	(Germany) T Malek	7^{7}	6
(Japan) A Morita	6^{4}	2
(Czech Republic) N Vaidišová	2	1
(France) S Brémond	6	6
WC	(Australia) O Rogowska	7	3	2
31	(Ukraine) A Bondarenko	5	6	6
22	(China) J Zheng	6	6
(France) C Pin	3	3
(Romania) S Cîrstea	2	2
(Hungary) M Czink	6	6
(Russia) E Bychkova	3	0
(Spain) L Domínguez Lino	6	6
(Ukraine) K Bondarenko	7^{9}	4	6
9	(Poland) A Radwańska	6^{7}	6	1

Second round
8	(Russia) S Kuznetsova	6	6
PR	(Germany) T Malek	2	2
(France) S Brémond	6^{1}	6	2
31	(Ukraine) A Bondarenko	7^{7}	1	6
22	(China) J Zheng	7^{7}	5	6
(Hungary) M Czink	6^{0}	7	3
(Spain) L Domínguez Lino	5	5
(Ukraine) K Bondarenko	7	7

Third round
8	(Russia) S Kuznetsova	7^{9}	6
31	(Ukraine) A Bondarenko	6^{7}	4
22	(China) J Zheng	6	6
(Ukraine) K Bondarenko	2	2

Fourth round
8	(Russia) S Kuznetsova	4
22	(China) J Zheng	1^{r}

==== Section 8 ====
First round
13	(Belarus) V Azarenka	6	6
(Czech Republic) P Kvitová	2	1
(Italy) T Garbin	6	2	7
(Russia) A Pavlyuchenkova	4	6	5
Q	(United Kingdom) E Baltacha	6	6
(Germany) A-L Grönefeld	1	4
(Belarus) O Govortsova	4	3
20	(France) A Mauresmo	6	6
28	(Italy) F Schiavone	6^{4}	1
(China) S Peng	7^{7}	6
(Spain) N Llagostera Vives	6	1	2
Q	(Bulgaria) S Karatantcheva	2	6	6
(Belarus) A Yakimova	3	7	3
(Argentina) G Dulko	6	5	6
WC	(China) M Yuan	3	2
2	(United States) S Williams	6	6

Second round
13	(Belarus) V Azarenka	4
(Italy) T Garbin	1^{r}
Q	(United Kingdom) E Baltacha	6	3	2
20	(France) A Mauresmo	4	6	6
(China) S Peng	6	6
Q	(Bulgaria) S Karatantcheva	4	0
(Argentina) G Dulko	3	5
2	(United States) S Williams	6	7

Third round
13	(Belarus) V Azarenka	6	6
20	(France) A Mauresmo	4	2
(China) S Peng	1	4
2	(United States) S Williams	6	6

Fourth round
13	(Belarus) V Azarenka	6	2^{r}
2	(United States) S Williams	3	4

== Championship match statistics ==
Category	(United States) S. Williams	(Russia) Safina
1st serve %	21/37 (57%)	29/49 (59%)
1st serve points won	20 of 21 = 95%	15 of 29 = 52%
2nd serve points won	10 of 16 = 63%	6 of 20 = 30%
Total service points won	30 of 37 = 81.08%	21 of 49 = 42.86%
Aces	4	3
Double faults	0	5
Winners	23	14
Unforced errors	7	21
Net points won	4 of 5 = 80%	2 of 3 = 67%
Break points converted	5 of 6 = 83%	1 of 1 = 100%
Return points won	28 of 49 = 57%	7 of 37 = 19%
Total points won	58	28

Preceded by 2008 US Open – Women's singles	Grand Slam women's singles	Succeeded by 2009 French Open – Women's singles
