= 2009 Australian Open – Girls' doubles =

Girls' doubles
- 2009 Australian Open

Final
- Champions: (United States) Christina McHale (Croatia) Ajla Tomljanović
- Runners-up: (Serbia) Aleksandra Krunić (Poland) Sandra Zaniewska
- Score: 6–1, 2–6, [10–4]

Events
Singles	men	women		boys	girls
Doubles	men	women	mixed	boys	girls
WC Singles	men	women	quad
WC Doubles	men	women	quad
Legends	men	women	mixed
- Australian Open

Ksenia Lykina and Anastasia Pavlyuchenkova were the defending champions, but chose not to participate that year.

Christina McHale and Ajla Tomljanović won the tournament, defeating Aleksandra Krunić and Sandra Zaniewska in the final, 6–1, 2–6, [10–4].

== Seeds ==
1. (Romania) Elena Bogdan / (France) Kristina Mladenovic (quarterfinals)
2. (Indonesia) Beatrice Gumulya / (Thailand) Noppawan Lertcheewakarn (semifinals)
3. (Romania) Ana Bogdan / (United States) Alexandra Cercone (second round)
4. (Russia) Ksenia Kirillova / (Russia) Ksenia Pervak (quarterfinals)
5. (Belarus) Anna Orlik / (United Kingdom) Laura Robson (quarterfinals)
6. (United States) Christina McHale / (Croatia) Ajla Tomljanović (champions)
7. (Russia) Yana Buchina / (United Kingdom) Heather Watson (first round)
8. (United States) Beatrice Capra / (United States) Lauren Embree (first round)

== Draw ==
Key

- Q = Qualifier
- WC = Wild card
- LL = Lucky loser
- Alt = Alternate
- ITF = ITF entry
- PR = Protected ranking
- SR = Special ranking
- SE = Special exempt
- JE = Junior exempt
- JR = Junior Accelerator Programme entrant
- CO = College Accelerator Programme entrant
- NG = Next Gen Accelerator Program entrant
- w/o = Walkover
- r = Retired
- d = Defaulted

=== Finals ===
Semifinals
(Australia) Isabella Holland (Australia) Sally Peers	4	6	[8]
6	(United States) Christina McHale (Croatia) Ajla Tomljanović	6	4	[10]
(Serbia) Aleksandra Krunić (Poland) Sandra Zaniewska	6	7^{7}
2	(Indonesia) Beatrice Gumulya (Thailand) Noppawan Lertcheewakarn	2	6^{2}

Final
6	(United States) Christina McHale (Croatia) Ajla Tomljanović	6	2	[10]
(Serbia) Aleksandra Krunić (Poland) Sandra Zaniewska	1	6	[4]

=== Top half ===
First round
1	(Romania) E Bogdan (France) K Mladenovic	6	6
(Chinese Taipei) T-f Juan (Thailand) N Saenyaukhot	1	1
(Netherlands) R Hogenkamp (Netherlands) Q Lemoine	6	4	[9]
(Czech Republic) M Borecká (Czech Republic) M Kubičíková	3	6	[11]
(Australia) I Holland (Australia) S Peers	4	6	[10]
(Ukraine) L Kichenok (Ukraine) N Kichenok	6	1	[5]
(South Africa) C Potgieter (South Africa) B Swanepoel	7	7^{8}
8	(United States) B Capra (United States) L Embree	5	6^{6}
4	(Russia) K Kirillova (Russia) K Pervak	6	6
(Thailand) K Issara (Thailand) K Narattana	2	3
WC	(Australia) O Rogowska (Australia) B Sheed	6	5	[8]
(Germany) L Berlinecke (Czech Republic) M Tůmová	4	7	[10]
(Canada) E Bouchard (India) K Shroff	6	0
(Bosnia and Herzegovina) E Burgić (South Africa) C Simmonds	1	0^{r}
WC	(Australia) A Nancarrow (Australia) V Rajicic	2	2
6	(United States) C McHale (Croatia) A Tomljanović	6	6

Second round
1	(Romania) E Bogdan (France) K Mladenovic	6	2	[10]
(Czech Republic) M Borecká (Czech Republic) M Kubičíková	4	6	[6]
(Australia) I Holland (Australia) S Peers	6	6
(South Africa) C Potgieter (South Africa) B Swanepoel	3	2
4	(Russia) K Kirillova (Russia) K Pervak	3	6	[10]
(Germany) L Berlinecke (Czech Republic) M Tůmová	6	3	[3]
(Canada) E Bouchard (India) K Shroff	4	1
6	(United States) C McHale (Croatia) A Tomljanović	6	6

Quarterfinals
1	(Romania) E Bogdan (France) K Mladenovic
(Australia) I Holland (Australia) S Peers	w/o
4	(Russia) K Kirillova (Russia) K Pervak	4	4
6	(United States) C McHale (Croatia) A Tomljanović	6	6

Semifinals
(Australia) I Holland (Australia) S Peers	4	6	[8]
6	(United States) C McHale (Croatia) A Tomljanović	6	4	[10]

=== Bottom half ===
First round
7	(Russia) Y Buchina (United Kingdom) H Watson	5	4
(Russia) V Kamenskaya (Russia) K Pimkina	6	6
(Thailand) L Kumkhum (Thailand) N Lertpitaksinchai	6	6
Alt	(Croatia) A Konjuh (Russia) AA Marenko	1	0
(Kazakhstan) Z Diyas (Croatia) S Njirić	7^{7}	4	[6]
(Serbia) A Krunić (Poland) S Zaniewska	6^{3}	6	[10]
WC	(Australia) A Sumner (Australia) M Vriens	6	4	[4]
3	(Romania) A Bogdan (United States) A Cercone	4	6	[10]
5	(Belarus) A Orlik (United Kingdom) L Robson	6	6
(Oman) F Al-Nabhani (Slovakia) Z Luknárová	4	3
(India) T Shah (India) R Teltumbde	4	6^{5}
(United States) E Goldfeld (United Kingdom) H James	6	7^{7}
(Sweden) A Brazhnikova (Ukraine) M Zanevska	6	2	[6]
(Japan) M Inoue (Japan) A Yamasoto	1	6	[10]
WC	(Australia) S Letcher (Australia) O Rich	1	3
2	(Indonesia) B Gumulya (Thailand) N Lertcheewakarn	6	6

Second round
(Russia) V Kamenskaya (Russia) K Pimkina	6	4	[12]
(Thailand) L Kumkhum (Thailand) N Lertpitaksinchai	1	6	[10]
(Serbia) A Krunić (Poland) S Zaniewska	6	6
3	(Romania) A Bogdan (United States) A Cercone	1	2
5	(Belarus) A Orlik (United Kingdom) L Robson	6	6
(United States) E Goldfeld (United Kingdom) H James	1	0
(Japan) M Inoue (Japan) A Yamasoto	6	5	[5]
2	(Indonesia) B Gumulya (Thailand) N Lertcheewakarn	4	7	[10]

Quarterfinals
(Russia) V Kamenskaya (Russia) K Pimkina	4	7^{8}	[8]
(Serbia) A Krunić (Poland) S Zaniewska	6	6^{6}	[10]
5	(Belarus) A Orlik (United Kingdom) L Robson
2	(Indonesia) B Gumulya (Thailand) N Lertcheewakarn	w/o

Semifinals
(Serbia) A Krunić (Poland) S Zaniewska	6	7^{7}
2	(Indonesia) B Gumulya (Thailand) N Lertcheewakarn	2	6^{2}
