= 2009 Australian Open – Boys' doubles =

Boys' doubles
- 2009 Australian Open

Final
- Champion: (Philippines) Francis Casey Alcantara (Chinese Taipei) Hsieh Cheng-peng
- Runner-up: (Russia) Mikhail Biryukov (Japan) Yasutaka Uchiyama
- Score: 6–4, 6–2

Events
Singles	men	women		boys	girls
Doubles	men	women	mixed	boys	girls
WC Singles	men	women	quad
WC Doubles	men	women	quad
Legends	men	women	mixed
- Australian Open

Hsieh Cheng-peng and Yang Tsung-hua were the defending champions, but only Cheng-peng participated this year. He partnered with Francis Casey Alcantara and won the final 6–4, 6–2, over Mikhail Biryukov and Yasutaka Uchiyama.

== Seeds ==
1. (India) Yuki Bhambri / (Chinese Taipei) Huang Liang-chi (semifinals)
2. (Croatia) Marin Draganja / (Croatia) Dino Marcan (quarterfinals)
3. (Spain) Carlos Boluda-Purkiss / (Spain) Pablo Carreño Busta (first round)
4. (United States) Harry Fowler / (Guatemala) Julen Urigüen (first round)
5. (France) Julien Obry / (France) Adrien Puget (quarterfinals)
6. (Japan) Hiroyasu Ehara / (Japan) Shuichi Sekiguchi (first round)
7. (Philippines) Francis Casey Alcantara / (Chinese Taipei) Hsieh Cheng-peng (champions)
8. (Portugal) Miguel Almeida / (Egypt) Karim-Mohamed Maamoun (first round)

== Draw ==
Key

- Q = Qualifier
- WC = Wild card
- LL = Lucky loser
- Alt = Alternate
- ITF = ITF entry
- PR = Protected ranking
- SR = Special ranking
- SE = Special exempt
- JE = Junior exempt
- JR = Junior Accelerator Programme entrant
- CO = College Accelerator Programme entrant
- NG = Next Gen Accelerator Program entrant
- w/o = Walkover
- r = Retired
- d = Defaulted

=== Finals ===
Semifinals
1	(India) Yuki Bhambri (Chinese Taipei) Huang Liang-chi	3	1
(Russia) Mikhail Biryukov (Japan) Yasutaka Uchiyama	6	6
7	(Philippines) Francis Casey Alcantara (Chinese Taipei) Hsieh Cheng-peng	7	6
(Austria) Maximilian Neuchrist (Austria) Tristan-Samuel Weissborn	6^{4}	4

Final
(Russia) Mikhail Biryukov (Japan) Yasutaka Uchiyama	4	2
7	(Philippines) Francis Casey Alcantara (Chinese Taipei) Hsieh Cheng-peng	6	6

=== Top half ===
First round
1	(India) Yuki Bhambri (Chinese Taipei) Huang Liang-chi	7	6
(Brazil) Gabriel Dias (Mexico) Germán Sánchez Delfín	5	3
(Italy) Marco Bortolotti (Belarus) Vladzimir Kruk	6	0	[10]
WC	(Australia) Jordan Szabo (Australia) Andrew Whittington	3	6	[7]
(Italy) Alessandro Colella (Italy) Federico Gaio	6	6
WC	(Australia) Jason Kubler (Australia) Nat Maraga	2	3
(South Africa) Grant Ive (Zimbabwe) Mbonisi Ndimande	4	5
5	(France) Julien Obry (France) Adrien Puget	6	7
4	(United States) Harry Fowler (Guatemala) Julen Urigüen	1	2
(Russia) Mikhail Biryukov (Japan) Yasutaka Uchiyama	6	6
(Australia) Jarryd Chaplin (Australia) James Duckworth	6	7
(Germany) Richard Becker (Germany) Alexandros Georgoudas	4	5
WC	(Australia) Luke Saville (Australia) Jack Schipanski	7	6
(India) Ronak Manuja (India) Kaza Vinayak	6^{1}	0
(France) Pierre-Hugues Herbert (Germany) Marko Krickovic	3	6	[10]
8	(Portugal) Miguel Almeida (Egypt) Karim-Mohamed Maamoun	6	3	[7]

Second round
1	(India) Y Bhambri (Chinese Taipei) L-c Huang	6	6
(Italy) M Bortolotti (Belarus) V Kruk	3	4
(Italy) A Colella (Italy) F Gaio	6	3	[11]
5	(France) J Obry (France) A Puget	3	6	[13]
(Russia) M Biryukov (Japan) Y Uchiyama	6	6
(Australia) J Chaplin (Australia) J Duckworth	3	4
WC	(Australia) L Saville (Australia) J Schipanski	3	2
(France) P-H Herbert (Germany) M Krickovic	6	6

Quarterfinals
1	(India) Y Bhambri (Chinese Taipei) L-c Huang	7	6
5	(France) J Obry (France) A Puget	6^{4}	4
(Russia) M Biryukov (Japan) Y Uchiyama	6	6
(France) P-H Herbert (Germany) M Krickovic	3	4

Semifinals
1	(India) Y Bhambri (Chinese Taipei) L-c Huang	3	1
(Russia) M Biryukov (Japan) Y Uchiyama	6	6

=== Bottom half ===
First round
7	(Philippines) Francis Casey Alcantara (Chinese Taipei) Hsieh Cheng-peng	6	6
(Croatia) Toni Androić (India) Sudarwa Sitaram	3	4
WC	(Australia) Andrew McLeod (Australia) Todd Volmari	3	0
(United Kingdom) James Chaudry (Republic of Ireland) John Morrissey	6	6
(Germany) Kevin Krawietz (Germany) Dominik Schulz	7	7
(Australia) Alex Sanders (Australia) Mark Verryth	6^{9}	5
(Sweden) Daniel Berta (Finland) Henri Laaksonen	6^{4}	6	[11]
3	(Spain) Carlos Boluda-Purkiss (Spain) Pablo Carreño Busta	7	3	[9]
6	(Japan) Hiroyasu Ehara (Japan) Shuichi Sekiguchi	7	6^{4}	[5]
(Sweden) Patrik Brydolf (Belarus) Andrei Vasilevski	6^{8}	7	[10]
(New Zealand) Jordan Kelly-Houston (South Africa) Nikala Scholtz	2	6	[3]
(Austria) Maximilian Neuchrist (Austria) Tristan-Samuel Weissborn	6	3	[10]
(Hong Kong) Dino Dell'orto (Australia) Stephen Hoh	6	3	[6]
(Australia) David Sofaer (Australia) Joey Swaysland	3	6	[10]
(New Zealand) Ben McLachlan (New Zealand) Riki McLachlan	2	4
2	(Croatia) Marin Draganja (Croatia) Dino Marcan	6	6

Second round
7	(Philippines) FC Alcantara (Chinese Taipei) C-p Hsieh	6	6
(United Kingdom) J Chaudry (Republic of Ireland) J Morrissey	0	3
(Germany) K Krawietz (Germany) D Schulz	w/o
(Sweden) D Berta (Finland) H Laaksonen
(Sweden) P Brydolf (Belarus) A Vasilevski	3	4
(Austria) M Neuchrist (Austria) T-S Weissborn	6	6
(Australia) D Sofaer (Australia) J Swaysland	3	2
2	(Croatia) M Draganja (Croatia) D Marcan	6	6

Quarterfinals
7	(Philippines) FC Alcantara (Chinese Taipei) C-p Hsieh	6	7
(Germany) K Krawietz (Germany) D Schulz	4	6^{5}
(Austria) M Neuchrist (Austria) T-S Weissborn	6	7
2	(Croatia) M Draganja (Croatia) D Marcan	3	5

Semifinals
7	(Philippines) FC Alcantara (Chinese Taipei) C-p Hsieh	7	6
(Austria) M Neuchrist (Austria) T-S Weissborn	6^{4}	4
