= 2013 Internationaux de Nouvelle-Calédonie – Singles =

Tennis contest held in New Caledonia

Singles
- 2013 Internationaux de Nouvelle-Calédonie

Final
- Champion: (France) Adrian Mannarino
- Runner-up: (Slovakia) Andrej Martin
- Score: 6–4, 6–3

Events
| Singles | Doubles |
| ← 2012 · | Internationaux de Nouvelle-Calédonie | · 2014 → |

Jérémy Chardy was the defending champion but decided not to participate.
Adrian Mannarino defeated Andrej Martin 6–4, 6–3 in the final to win the title.

== Seeds ==
1. (Belgium) Steve Darcis (second round)
2. (France) Florent Serra (first round)
3. (France) Marc Gicquel (semifinals)
4. (France) Jonathan Dasnières de Veigy (semifinals)
5. (Canada) Peter Polansky (second round)
6. (Spain) Adrián Menéndez (second round)
7. (France) Adrian Mannarino (champion)
8. (Israel) Amir Weintraub (first round)

== Draw ==
=== Key ===
- Q = Qualifier
- WC = Wild card
- LL = Lucky loser
- Alt = Alternate
- ITF = ITF entry
- PR = Protected ranking
- SR = Special ranking
- SE = Special exempt
- JE = Junior exempt
- JR = Junior Accelerator Programme entrant
- CO = College Accelerator Programme entrant
- NG = Next Gen Accelerator Program entrant
- w/o = Walkover
- r = Retired
- d = Defaulted

=== Finals ===
Semifinals
(Slovakia) Andrej Martin | 6 | 6
4 | (France) Jonathan Dasnières de Veigy | 2 | 2
3 | (France) Marc Gicquel | 6 | 3 | 6^{1}
7 | (France) Adrian Mannarino | 3 | 6 | 7^{7}

Final
(Slovakia) Andrej Martin | 4 | 3
7 | (France) Adrian Mannarino | 6 | 6

=== Top half ===
First round
1 | (Belgium) S Darcis | 7^{7} | 6
(Australia) Isaac Frost | 6^{4} | 3
(Japan) T Matsui | 2 | 4
(Slovakia) A Martin | 6 | 6
(Australia) Leon Frost | 3 | 0
(France) M Teixeira | 6 | 6
(Canada) S Diez | 3 | 7^{7} | 6^{5}
6 | (Spain) A Menéndez | 6 | 6^{5} | 7^{7}
4 | (France) J Dasnières de Veigy | 0 | 6 | 6
(Denmark) F Nielsen | 6 | 4 | 3
(New Zealand) A Sitak | 6 | 6
(Italy) R Ghedin | 3 | 2
(Australia) S Groth | 7 | 4 | 7
WC | (France) L Pouille | 5 | 6 | 5
(France) S Robert | 6 | 0 | 6
8 | (Israel) A Weintraub | 4 | 6 | 4

Second round
1 | (Belgium) S Darcis | 2 | 3
(Slovakia) A Martin | 6 | 6
(France) M Teixeira | 6 | 6
6 | (Spain) A Menéndez | 3 | 1
4 | (France) J Dasnières de Veigy | 6 | 1 | 7^{7}
(New Zealand) A Sitak | 2 | 6 | 6^{5}
(Australia) S Groth | 2 | 7 | 6
(France) S Robert | 6 | 6^{4} | 2

Quarterfinals
(Slovakia) A Martin | 6 | 6
(France) M Teixeira | 3 | 2
4 | (France) J Dasnières de Veigy | 6 | 6
(Australia) S Groth | 3 | 3

Semifinals
(Slovakia) A Martin | 6 | 6
4 | (France) J Dasnières de Veigy | 2 | 2

=== Bottom half ===
First round
5 | (Canada) P Polansky | 6 | 7
(Czech Republic) L Dlouhý | 3 | 5
(Chinese Taipei) T Chen | 6^{5} | 7^{7} | 3
(Italy) A Giannessi | 7^{7} | 6^{3} | 6
(France) G Burquier | 7^{7} | 5 | 6
Q | (Australia) D Propoggia | 6^{2} | 7 | 3
(France) N Devilder | 2 | 4
3 | (France) M Gicquel | 6 | 6
7 | (France) A Mannarino | 6 | 6
Q | (Germany) Nicolas Ernst | 2 | 1
(Slovakia) I Klec | 6 | 6^{6} | 6^{6}
WC | (New Zealand) J Statham | 2 | 7^{8} | 7^{8}
Q | (France) N N'Godrela | 5 | 6^{4}
Q | (France) M Chazal | 7 | 7^{7}
(Ukraine) D Molchanov | 6 | 7
2 | (France) F Serra | 4 | 5

Second round
5 | (Canada) P Polansky | 3 | 6 | 2
(Italy) A Giannessi | 6 | 2 | 6
(France) G Burquier | 0 | 4
3 | (France) M Gicquel | 6 | 6
7 | (France) A Mannarino | 7 | 6
WC | (New Zealand) J Statham | 5 | 2
Q | (France) M Chazal | 3 | 4
(Ukraine) D Molchanov | 6 | 6

Quarterfinals
(Italy) A Giannessi | 2 | 2
3 | (France) M Gicquel | 6 | 6
7 | (France) A Mannarino | 6 | 6
(Ukraine) D Molchanov | 2 | 0

Semifinals
3 | (France) M Gicquel | 6 | 3 | 6^{1}
7 | (France) A Mannarino | 3 | 6 | 7^{7}
