= 2011 Internationaux de Nouvelle-Calédonie – Doubles =

Doubles
- 2011 Internationaux de Nouvelle-Calédonie

Final
- Champions: (Germany) Dominik Meffert (Denmark) Frederik Nielsen
- Runners-up: (Italy) Flavio Cipolla (Italy) Simone Vagnozzi
- Score: 7–6^{(7–4)}, 5–7, [10–5]

Events
Singles	Doubles
← 2010 ·	Internationaux de Nouvelle-Calédonie	· 2012 →

Édouard Roger-Vasselin and Nicolas Devilder were the defending champions but did not participate.
No 2 seeds Dominik Meffert and Frederik Nielsen won the final against the No. 1 seeds Flavio Cipolla and Simone Vagnozzi, 7–6^{(7–4)}, 5–7, [10–5].

== Seeds ==
1. (Italy) Flavio Cipolla / (Italy) Simone Vagnozzi (Runner up)
2. (Germany) Dominik Meffert / (Denmark) Frederik Nielsen (champion)
3. (Netherlands) Jesse Huta Galung / (Netherlands) Igor Sijsling (semifinals, withdrew)
4. (Slovakia) Pavol Červenák / (Slovakia) Ivo Klec (semifinals)

== Draw ==
=== Key ===
- Q = Qualifier
- WC = Wild card
- LL = Lucky loser
- Alt = Alternate
- SE = Special exempt
- PR = Protected ranking
- ITF = ITF entry
- JE = Junior exempt
- w/o = Walkover
- r = Retired
- d = Defaulted
- SR = Special ranking

=== Draw ===
Preliminaries
1	(Italy) Flavio Cipolla (Italy) Simone Vagnozzi	6	6
(South Africa) Rik de Voest (United States) Michael Yani	2	4
(France) Augustin Gensse (France) Vincent Millot	6	6
WC	(France) Julien Delaplane (France) Nicolas N'Godrela	2	2
4	(Slovakia) Pavol Červenák (Slovakia) Ivo Klec	3	6	[10]
(France) Jonathan Dasnières de Veigy (France) Benoît Paire	6	2	[5]
(France) Marc Gicquel (France) Olivier Patience	6	6
WC	(France) Florian Reynet (France) Laurent Rochette	4	3
(Luxembourg) Gilles Müller (France) Clément Reix	6	3	[10]
(France) David Guez (France) Josselin Ouanna	3	6	[7]
(United States) Kevin Kim (Thailand) Danai Udomchoke	3	0
3	(Netherlands) Jesse Huta Galung (Netherlands) Igor Sijsling	6	6
WC	(France) Charles-Antoine Brézac (France) Ludovic Walter	4	1
(Italy) Matteo Viola (Israel) Amir Weintraub	6	6
(France) Grégoire Burquier (Germany) Sebastian Rieschick	1	5
2	(Germany) Dominik Meffert (Denmark) Frederik Nielsen	6	7

Quarterfinals
1	(Italy) F Cipolla (Italy) S Vagnozzi	6	6
(France) A Gensse (France) V Millot	1	3
4	(Slovakia) P Červenák (Slovakia) I Klec	7^{7}	6
(France) M Gicquel (France) O Patience	6^{4}	4
(Luxembourg) G Müller (France) C Reix	w/o
3	(Netherlands) J Huta Galung (Netherlands) I Sijsling
(Italy) M Viola (Israel) A Weintraub	5	6^{6}
2	(Germany) D Meffert (Denmark) F Nielsen	7	7^{8}

Semifinals
1	(Italy) F Cipolla (Italy) S Vagnozzi	6	6
4	(Slovakia) P Červenák (Slovakia) I Klec	3	3
3	(Netherlands) J Huta Galung (Netherlands) I Sijsling	w/o
2	(Germany) D Meffert (Denmark) F Nielsen

Finals
1	(Italy) F Cipolla (Italy) S Vagnozzi	6^{4}	7	[5]
2	(Germany) D Meffert (Denmark) F Nielsen	7^{7}	5	[10]
