= 2013 Internationaux de Nouvelle-Calédonie – Doubles =

Doubles
- 2013 Internationaux de Nouvelle-Calédonie

Final
- Champions: (Australia) Samuel Groth (Japan) Toshihide Matsui
- Runners-up: (New Zealand) Artem Sitak (New Zealand) Jose Statham
- Score: 7–6^{(8–6)}, 1–6, [10–4]

Events
| Singles | Doubles |
| ← 2012 · | Internationaux de Nouvelle-Calédonie | · 2014 → |

Sanchai Ratiwatana and Sonchat Ratiwatana were the defending champions but decided not to participate.
Samuel Groth and Toshihide Matsui won the final 7–6^{(8–6)}, 1–6, [10–4] against Artem Sitak and Jose Statham.

== Seeds ==
1. (Czech Republic) Lukáš Dlouhý / (Australia) Jordan Kerr (semifinals)
2. (Spain) Adrián Menéndez / (Ukraine) Denys Molchanov (second round)
3. (Australia) Dane Propoggia / (Israel) Amir Weintraub (semifinals)
4. (New Zealand) Artem Sitak / (New Zealand) Jose Statham (final)

== Draw ==
=== Key ===
- Q = Qualifier
- WC = Wild card
- LL = Lucky loser
- Alt = Alternate
- SE = Special exempt
- PR = Protected ranking
- ITF = ITF entry
- JE = Junior exempt
- w/o = Walkover
- r = Retired
- d = Defaulted
- SR = Special ranking

=== Draw ===
First round
1 | (Czech Republic) L Dlouhý (Australia) J Kerr | w/o
(Italy) R Ghedin (Italy) A Giannessi
(France) G Burquier (France) M Teixeira | 6 | 6
(France) N Devilder (France) L Pouille | 2 | 4
4 | (New Zealand) A Sitak (New Zealand) J Statham | 6 | 6
(France) J Dasnières de Veigy (France) M Gicquel | 4 | 3
(Chinese Taipei) T Chen (Slovakia) A Martin | 6 | 6
WC | (France) M Chazal (Germany) Nicolas Ernst | 2 | 2
(Canada) S Diez (Canada) P Polansky | w/o
WC | (Australia) Isaac Frost (Australia) Leon Frost
WC | (France) Julien Delaplane (France) N N'Godrela | 6^{6} | 3
3 | (Australia) D Propoggia (Israel) A Weintraub | 7^{8} | 6
(Slovakia) I Klec (France) S Robert
(Australia) S Groth (Japan) T Matsui | w/o
(France) A Mannarino (France) F Serra
2 | (Spain) A Menéndez (Ukraine) D Molchanov | w/o

Quarterfinals
1 | (Czech Republic) L Dlouhý (Australia) J Kerr | 6 | 6
(France) G Burquier (France) M Teixeira | 2 | 0
4 | (New Zealand) A Sitak (New Zealand) J Statham | 6 | 6
(Chinese Taipei) T Chen (Slovakia) A Martin | 2 | 1
(Canada) S Diez (Canada) P Polansky | 4 | 0
3 | (Australia) D Propoggia (Israel) A Weintraub | 6 | 6
(Australia) S Groth (Japan) T Matsui | 6 | 6
2 | (Spain) A Menéndez (Ukraine) D Molchanov | 3 | 3

Semifinals
1 | (Czech Republic) L Dlouhý (Australia) J Kerr | 6 | 3 | [9]
4 | (New Zealand) A Sitak (New Zealand) J Statham | 3 | 6 | [11]
3 | (Australia) D Propoggia (Israel) A Weintraub | 2 | 2
(Australia) S Groth (Japan) T Matsui | 6 | 6

Final
4 | (New Zealand) A Sitak (New Zealand) J Statham | 6^{6} | 6 | 4
(Australia) S Groth (Japan) T Matsui | 7^{8} | 1 | [10]
