= 2010 Internationaux de Nouvelle-Calédonie – Singles =

Singles
- 2010 Internationaux de Nouvelle-Calédonie

Final
- Champion: (Germany) Florian Mayer
- Runner-up: (Italy) Flavio Cipolla
- Score: 6-3, 6-0

Events
Singles	Doubles
← 2009 ·	Internationaux de Nouvelle-Calédonie	· 2011 →

Brendan Evans was the defending champion, but he lost in the first round against Kyu-tae Im.
Florian Mayer won in the final 6-3, 6-0, against Flavio Cipolla.

== Seeds ==
1. (Germany) Florian Mayer (champion)
2. (France) Josselin Ouanna (second round)
3. (United States) Brendan Evans (first round)
4. (France) David Guez (semifinals)
5. (France) Édouard Roger-Vasselin (first round)
6. (Italy) Flavio Cipolla (final)
7. (South Africa) Kevin Anderson (semifinals)
8. (United States) Michael Yani (second round)

== Draw ==
=== Key ===
- Q = Qualifier
- WC = Wild card
- LL = Lucky loser
- Alt = Alternate
- SE = Special exempt
- PR = Protected ranking
- ITF = ITF entry
- JE = Junior exempt
- w/o = Walkover
- r = Retired
- d = Defaulted
- SR = Special ranking

=== Finals ===
Semifinals
1	(Germany) Florian Mayer	0	6	7
7	(South Africa) Kevin Anderson	6	2	5
4	(France) David Guez	4	1
6	(Italy) Flavio Cipolla	6	6

Final
1	(Germany) Florian Mayer	6	6
6	(Italy) Flavio Cipolla	3	0

=== Top half ===
First round
1	(Germany) Florian Mayer	6	6
Q	(Australia) Leon Frost	0	2
(France) Alexandre Sidorenko	5	7	6
(France) Jonathan Dasnières de Veigy	7	5	1
Q	(Italy) Simone Vagnozzi	4	6	3
(Belgium) Ruben Bemelmans	6	4	3
(Slovenia) Grega Žemlja	2	6	7
5	(France) Édouard Roger-Vasselin	6	3	5
3	(United States) Brendan Evans	7^{7}	5	r
(South Korea) Kyu-tae Im	6^{5}	5
(Serbia) Ilija Bozoljac	6	7
(Slovakia) Martin Kližan	4	5
(Italy) Marco Crugnola	3	6	7^{7}
(United States) Lester Cook	6	2	6^{2}
(Croatia) Roko Karanušić	3	1
7	(South Africa) Kevin Andersom	6	6

Second round
1	(Germany) F Mayer	6	6
(France) A Sidorenko	3	1
Q	(Italy) S Vagnozzi	6	2	6
(Slovenia) G Žemlja	2	6	3
(South Korea) K-t Im	2	2
(Serbia) I Bozoljac	6	6
(Italy) M Crugnola	2	2
7	(South Africa) K Anderson	6	6

Quarterfinals
1	(Germany) F Mayer	6	2	6
Q	(Italy) S Vagnozzi	3	6	3
(Serbia) I Bozoljac	5	5
7	(South Africa) K Anderson	7	7

Semifinals
1	(Germany) F Mayer	0	6	7
7	(South Africa) K Anderson	6	2	5

=== Bottom half ===
First round
8	(United States) Michael Yani	7	6
(Czech Republic) Dušan Lojda	5	3
WC	(Bulgaria) Grigor Dimitrov	7	6
(United States) Alex Kuznetsov	5	4
WC	(United States) Ryan Harrison	6	6
WC	(New Zealand) Daniel King-Turner	3	4
WC	(France) Nicolas N'Godrela	1	3
4	(France) David Guez	6	6
6	(Italy) Flavio Cipolla	4	6	6
(France) Nicolas Devilder	6	4	2
(France) Vincent Millot	6	6
(Slovakia) Pavol Červenák	3	4
(Germany) Simon Stadler	7^{7}	6
Q	(Australia) Dane Propoggia	6^{3}	1
Q	(Austria) Martin Slanar	6^{4}	3
2	(France) Josselin Ouanna	7^{7}	6

Second round
8	(United States) M Yani	3	6	3
WC	(Bulgaria) G Dimitrov	6	3	6
WC	(United States) R Harrison	2	3
4	(France) D Guez	6	6
6	(Italy) F Cipolla	6	6
(France) V Millot	4	2
(Germany) S Stadler	0	6	6
2	(France) J Ouanna	6	4	4

Quarterfinals
WC	(Bulgaria) G Dimitrov	3	2
4	(France) D Guez	6	6
6	(Italy) F Cipolla	3	6	6
(Germany) S Stadler	6	1	2

Semifinals
4	(France) D Guez	4	1
6	(Italy) F Cipolla	6	6
