= 2012 Internationaux de Nouvelle-Calédonie – Doubles =

Doubles
- 2012 Internationaux de Nouvelle-Calédonie

Final
- Champions: (Thailand) Sanchai Ratiwatana; (Thailand) Sonchat Ratiwatana
- Runners-up: (France) Axel Michon; (France) Guillaume Rufin
- Score: 6–0, 6–4

Events
Singles	Doubles
← 2011 ·	Internationaux de Nouvelle-Calédonie	· 2013 →

Dominik Meffert and Frederik Nielsen were the defending champions, but decided not to participate.
Sanchai Ratiwatana and Sonchat Ratiwatana won the title, beating Axel Michon and Guillaume Rufin 6–0, 6–4 in the final.

== Seeds ==
1. (Spain) Adrián Menéndez Maceiras / (Italy) Simone Vagnozzi (first round)
2. (Thailand) Sanchai Ratiwatana / (Thailand) Sonchat Ratiwatana (champions)
3. (Belgium) Ruben Bemelmans / (Belarus) Uladzimir Ignatik (quarterfinals)
4. (Spain) Daniel Muñoz de la Nava / (Canada) Peter Polansky (semifinals)

== Draw ==
=== Key ===
- Q = Qualifier
- WC = Wild card
- LL = Lucky loser
- Alt = Alternate
- SE = Special exempt
- PR = Protected ranking
- ITF = ITF entry
- JE = Junior exempt
- w/o = Walkover
- r = Retired
- d = Defaulted
- SR = Special ranking

=== Draw ===
First round

Quarterfinals

Semifinals

Finals

1
- (Spain) A Menéndez
- (Italy) S Vagnozzi
7^{7}
4
[5]

- (France) Axel Michon
- (France) G Rufin
6^{3}
6
[10]

- (France) Axel Michon
- (France) G Rufin
6
6

- (France) R Jouan
- (France) M Rodrigues
6
6

- (France) R Jouan
- (France) M Rodrigues
4
1

WC
(France) Cyprien Partridge
(France) David Pateau
2
2

- (France) Axel Michon
- (France) G Rufin
6
6

4
- (Spain) D Muñoz de la Nava
- (Canada) P Polansky
w/o

4
- (Spain) D Muñoz de la Nava
- (Canada) P Polansky
4
0

- (France) Grégoire Burquier
- (France) F Serra

4
- (Spain) D Muñoz de la Nava
- (Canada) P Polansky
6
6

WC
(France) Christophe Godot
(France) Nicolas N'Godrela
2
3

- (United States) M Russell
- (United States) M Yani
2
1

- (United States) M Russell
- (United States) M Yani
6
6

- (France) Axel Michon
- (France) G Rufin
0
4

- (Thailand) D Udomchoke
- (France) L Walter
6
4
[10]

2
- (Thailand) Sa Ratiwatana
- (Thailand) So Ratiwatana
6
6

- (France) A Gensse
- (Germany) S Rieschick
4
6
[4]

- (Thailand) D Udomchoke
- (France) L Walter
7^{7}
4
[10]

- (Czech Republic) D Lojda
- (Czech Republic) J Mertl
3
4

3
- (Belgium) R Bemelmans
- (Belarus) U Ignatik
6^{4}
6
[6]

3
- (Belgium) R Bemelmans
- (Belarus) U Ignatik
6
6

- (Thailand) D Udomchoke
- (France) L Walter
2
5

- (Italy) M Viola
- (Israel) A Weintraub
6
7

2
- (Thailand) Sa Ratiwatana
- (Thailand) So Ratiwatana
6
7

(Australia) Matthew Barton
(Australia) Leon Frost
2
5

- (Italy) M Viola
- (Israel) A Weintraub
3
3

- (France) J Dasnières de Veigy
- (France) D Guez
3
4

2
- (Thailand) Sa Ratiwatana
- (Thailand) So Ratiwatana
6
6

2
- (Thailand) Sa Ratiwatana
- (Thailand) So Ratiwatana
6
6
