= 2008 BNP Paribas Masters – Singles =

Singles
- 2008 BNP Paribas Masters

Final
- Champion: (France) Jo-Wilfried Tsonga
- Runner-up: (Argentina) David Nalbandian
- Score: 6–3, 4–6, 6–4

Details
- Draw: 48 (3WC/6Q/2LL)
- Seeds: 16

Events
Singles	Doubles
- Paris Masters

Jo-Wilfried Tsonga defeated defending champion David Nalbandian in the final, 6–3, 4–6, 6–4 to win the singles tennis title at the 2008 Paris Masters. It was his first Masters title.

== Seeds ==
All seeds receive a bye into the second round.

1. (Spain) Rafael Nadal (quarterfinals, retired due to a right knee injury)
2. (Switzerland) Roger Federer (quarterfinals, withdrew due to a back injury)
3. (Serbia) Novak Djokovic (third round)
4. (United Kingdom) Andy Murray (quarterfinals)
5. (Spain) David Ferrer (second round)
6. (Russia) Nikolay Davydenko (semifinals)
7. (United States) Andy Roddick (quarterfinals)
8. (Argentina) David Nalbandian (final)
9. (Argentina) Juan Martín del Potro (third round)
10. (France) Gilles Simon (third round)
11. (United States) James Blake (semifinals)
12. (Switzerland) Stanislas Wawrinka (second round)
13. (France) Jo-Wilfried Tsonga (champion)
14. (France) ~~Richard Gasquet~~ (withdrew due to an elbow injury)
15. (Spain) Fernando Verdasco (third round)
16. (France) Gaël Monfils (third round)

== Draw ==
Key

- Q = Qualifier
- WC = Wild card
- LL = Lucky loser
- Alt = Alternate
- ITF = ITF entry
- PR = Protected ranking
- SR = Special ranking
- SE = Special exempt
- JE = Junior exempt
- JR = Junior Accelerator Programme entrant
- CO = College Accelerator Programme entrant
- NG = Next Gen Accelerator Program entrant
- w/o = Walkover
- r = Retired
- d = Defaulted

=== Finals ===
Quarterfinals
1	(Spain) Rafael Nadal	1	0^{r}
6	(Russia) Nikolay Davydenko	6	0
4	(United Kingdom) Andy Murray	6^{3}	3
8	(Argentina) David Nalbandian	7	6
7	(United States) Andy Roddick	7	4	6^{5}
13	(France) Jo-Wilfried Tsonga	5	6	7
11	(United States) James Blake	w/o
2	(Switzerland) Roger Federer

Semifinals
6	(Russia) Nikolay Davydenko	1	7	4
8	(Argentina) David Nalbandian	6	5	6
13	(France) Jo-Wilfried Tsonga	6	6
11	(United States) James Blake	4	3

Final
8	(Argentina) David Nalbandian	3	6	4
13	(France) Jo-Wilfried Tsonga	6	4	6

=== Top half ===
==== Section 1 ====
First round
LL	(Argentina) G Cañas	6	5	3
LL	(France) F Serra	4	7	6
(Russia) M Safin	0	6^{4}
Q	(Argentina) J Mónaco	6	7
Q	(United States) R Ginepri	4	5
(Czech Republic) T Berdych	6	7
Q	(Croatia) I Ljubičić	6	6
Q	(Serbia) V Troicki	3	4

Second round
1	(Spain) R Nadal	6	6
LL	(France) F Serra	2	4
Q	(Argentina) J Mónaco	4	4
16	(France) G Monfils	6	6
12	(Switzerland) S Wawrinka	3	5
(Czech Republic) T Berdych	6	7
Q	(Croatia) I Ljubičić	6^{5}	5
6	(Russia) N Davydenko	7	7

Third round
1	(Spain) R Nadal	6	6
16	(France) G Monfils	3	2
(Czech Republic) T Berdych	1	1
6	(Russia) N Davydenko	6	6

Quarterfinals
1	(Spain) R Nadal	1	0^{r}
6	(Russia) N Davydenko	6	0

==== Section 2 ====
First round
(Cyprus) M Baghdatis	5	7	2^{r}
(United States) S Querrey	7	6^{5}	3
(Spain) T Robredo	7	7
WC	(France) J Chardy	6^{4}	6^{5}
(Croatia) M Ančić	6	3	6
(Germany) R Schüttler	4	6	1
(Germany) N Kiefer	6	7
(Croatia) I Karlović	4	5

Second round
4	(United Kingdom) A Murray	6	6
(United States) S Querrey	2	4
(Spain) T Robredo	2	7	2
15	(Spain) F Verdasco	6	6^{6}	6
9	(Argentina) JM del Potro	6	6
(Croatia) M Ančić	0	4
(Germany) N Kiefer	6^{5}	3
8	(Argentina) D Nalbandian	7	6

Third round
4	(United Kingdom) A Murray	6	7
15	(Spain) F Verdasco	3	6^{6}
9	(Argentina) JM del Potro	4	0
8	(Argentina) D Nalbandian	6	6

Quarterfinals
4	(United Kingdom) A Murray	6^{3}	3
8	(Argentina) D Nalbandian	7	6

=== Bottom half ===
==== Section 3 ====
First round
(Serbia) J Tipsarević	3	4
(Spain) F López	6	6
(France) P-H Mathieu	6^{6}	3
(Russia) I Andreev	7	6
(France) M Gicquel	4	6	4
(Czech Republic) R Štěpánek	6	3	6
WC	(France) A Mannarino	3	2
(Russia) D Tursunov	6	6

Second round
7	(United States) A Roddick	6	6
(Spain) F López	3	4
(Russia) I Andreev	3	5
10	(France) G Simon	6	7
13	(France) J-W Tsonga	3	6	6
(Czech Republic) R Štěpánek	6	4	4
(Russia) D Tursunov	2	3^{r}
3	(Serbia) N Djokovic	6	4

Third round
7	(United States) A Roddick	6	7
10	(France) G Simon	3	5
13	(France) J-W Tsonga	6	1	6
3	(Serbia) N Djokovic	4	6	3

Quarterfinals
7	(United States) A Roddick	7	4	6^{5}
13	(France) J-W Tsonga	5	6	7

==== Section 4 ====
First round
(Germany) P Kohlschreiber	6	6
(Russia) M Youzhny	1	4
Q	(Italy) S Bolelli	7	6
(Finland) J Nieminen	5	4
(Croatia) M Čilić	7	6
(Italy) A Seppi	6^{5}	2
WC	(France) J Ouanna	3	4
(Sweden) R Söderling	6	6

Second round
5	(Spain) D Ferrer	3	2
(Germany) P Kohlschreiber	6	6
Q	(Italy) S Bolelli	7	3	4
11	(United States) J Blake	6^{10}	6	6
Q	(Spain) M Granollers	4	6^{2}
(Croatia) M Čilić	6	7
(Sweden) R Söderling	4	6^{7}
2	(Switzerland) R Federer	6	7

Third round
(Germany) P Kohlschreiber	4	4
11	(United States) J Blake	6	6
(Croatia) M Čilić	3	4
2	(Switzerland) R Federer	6	6

Quarterfinals
11	(United States) J Blake	w/o
2	(Switzerland) R Federer

== Qualifying ==
=== Qualifying seeds ===
1. (Italy) Simone Bolelli (qualified)
2. (Croatia) Ivan Ljubičić (qualified)
3. (Argentina) Juan Mónaco (qualified)
4. (Spain) Marcel Granollers (qualified)
5. (Serbia) Viktor Troicki (qualified)
6. (United States) Robby Ginepri (qualified)
7. (Spain) Guillermo García López (first round)
8. (France) Florent Serra (qualifying competition, lucky loser)
9. (France) Nicolas Devilder (first round)
10. (Argentina) Guillermo Cañas (qualifying competition, lucky loser)
11. (Spain) Iván Navarro (qualifying competition)
12. (Ecuador) Nicolás Lapentti (qualifying competition)

=== Qualifiers ===
1. (Italy) Simone Bolelli
2. (Croatia) Ivan Ljubičić
3. (Argentina) Juan Mónaco
4. (Spain) Marcel Granollers
5. (Serbia) Viktor Troicki
6. (United States) Robby Ginepri

=== Lucky losers ===
1. (France) Florent Serra
2. (Argentina) Guillermo Cañas

=== Qualifying draw ===
==== First qualifier ====
First round
1	(Italy) Simone Bolelli	6	6^{6}	7
(Australia) Chris Guccione	4	7^{8}	5
WC	(France) David Guez	6	3	4
8	(France) Florent Serra	1	6	6

Qualifying competition
1	(Italy) Simone Bolelli	6	6
8	(France) Florent Serra	3	4

==== Second qualifier ====
First round
2	(Croatia) Ivan Ljubičić	6	7^{7}
(France) Laurent Recouderc	3	6^{3}
WC	(France) Gary Lugassy	0	1
10	(Argentina) Guillermo Cañas	6	6

Qualifying competition
2	(Croatia) Ivan Ljubičić	6	4	6
10	(Argentina) Guillermo Cañas	4	6	1

==== Third qualifier ====
First round
3	(Argentina) Juan Mónaco	6^{7}	7^{7}	2
WC	(France) Jonathan Eysseric	7^{9}	6^{1}	0^{r}
WC	(France) Mathieu Rodrigues	3	1
12	(Ecuador) Nicolás Lapentti	6	6

Qualifying competition
3	(Argentina) Juan Mónaco	6	5	6
12	(Ecuador) Nicolás Lapentti	3	7	2

==== Fourth qualifier ====
First round
4	(Spain) Marcel Granollers	3	6	6
(France) Alexandre Sidorenko	6	1	3
(France) Nicolas Mahut	6	6
9	(France) Nicolas Devilder	2	4

Qualifying competition
4	(Spain) Marcel Granollers	5	6	6
(France) Nicolas Mahut	7	4	2

==== Fifth qualifier ====
First round
5	(Serbia) Viktor Troicki	6	3
(Belgium) Kristof Vliegen	2	1^{r}
(Belgium) Olivier Rochus	1	6	7^{7}
7	(Spain) Guillermo García López	6	3	6^{3}

Qualifying competition
5	(Serbia) Viktor Troicki	7	7
(Belgium) Olivier Rochus	5	5

==== Sixth qualifier ====
First round
6	(United States) Robby Ginepri	6	6
(France) Arnaud Clément	2	2
Alt	(France) Jonathan Dasnières de Veigy	3	2
11	(Spain) Iván Navarro	6	6

Qualifying competition
6	(United States) Robby Ginepri	6	6
11	(Spain) Iván Navarro	3	2
