= 2013 Internationaux de Nouvelle-Calédonie =

- Date: 31 December 2012 – 6 January 2013
- Edition: 10th
- Draw: 32S / 16D
- Prize money: $75,000
- Surface: Hard
- Location: Nouméa, New Caledonia

Champions

Singles
- (France) Adrian Mannarino

Doubles
- (Australia) Samuel Groth / (Japan) Toshihide Matsui
← 2012 ·	Internationaux de Nouvelle-Calédonie	· 2014 →

The 2013 Internationaux de Nouvelle-Calédonie was a professional tennis tournament played on hard courts. It was the tenth edition of the tournament, which was part of the 2013 ATP Challenger Tour. It took place in Nouméa, New Caledonia between 31 December 2012 and 6 January 2013.

== Singles main-draw entrants ==
=== Seeds ===
Country	Player	Rank^{1}	Seed
BEL	Steve Darcis	93	1
FRA	Florent Serra	118	2
FRA	Marc Gicquel	152	3
FRA	Jonathan Dasnières de Veigy	154	4
CAN	Peter Polansky	180	5
ESP	Adrián Menéndez	187	6
FRA	Adrian Mannarino	191	7
ISR	Amir Weintraub	195	8

- ^{1} Rankings are as of December 24, 2012.

=== Other entrants ===
The following players received wildcards into the singles main draw:

- (France) Lucas Pouille
- (New Zealand) Jose Statham

The following players received entry from the qualifying draw:

- (France) Maxime Chazal
- (Germany) Nicolas Ernst
- (France) Nicolas N'Godrela
- (Australia) Dane Propoggia

== Doubles main-draw entrants ==
=== Seeds ===
Country	Player	Country	Player	Rank^{1}	Seed
CZE	Lukáš Dlouhý	AUS	Jordan Kerr	205	1
ESP	Adrián Menéndez	UKR	Denys Molchanov	248	2
AUS	Dane Propoggia	ISR	Amir Weintraub	458	3
NZL	Artem Sitak	NZL	Jose Statham	568	4

- ^{1} Rankings as of December 24, 2012.

=== Other entrants ===
The following pairs received wildcards into the doubles main draw:

- (France) Maxime Chazal / (Germany) Nicolas Ernst
- (France) Julien Delaplane / (France) Nicolas N'Godrela
- (Australia) Isaac Frost / (Australia) Leon Frost

== Champions ==
=== Singles ===
- (France) Adrian Mannarino def. (Slovakia) Andrej Martin, 6–4, 6–3

=== Doubles ===
- (Australia) Samuel Groth / (Japan) Toshihide Matsui def. (New Zealand) Artem Sitak / (New Zealand) Jose Statham, 7–6^{(8–6)}, 1–6, [10–4]
