= 2010 Internationaux de Nouvelle-Calédonie – Doubles =

Doubles
- 2010 Internationaux de Nouvelle-Calédonie

Final
- Champions: (France) Nicolas Devilder (France) Édouard Roger-Vasselin
- Runners-up: (Italy) Flavio Cipolla (Italy) Simone Vagnozzi
- Score: 5-7, 6-2, [10-8]

Events
Singles	Doubles
← 2009 ·	Internationaux de Nouvelle-Calédonie	· 2011 →

Nicolas Devilder and Édouard Roger-Vasselin won in the final 5-7, 6-2, [10-8], against Flavio Cipolla and Simone Vagnozzi.

== Seeds ==
1. (Italy) Flavio Cipolla / (Italy) Simone Vagnozzi (final)
2. (South Africa) Kevin Anderson / (United States) Brian Battistone (second round)
3. (Italy) Marco Crugnola / (Italy) Uros Vico (first round)
4. (Bulgaria) Grigor Dimitrov / (France) Alexandre Sidorenko (second round)

== Draw ==
=== Key ===
- Q = Qualifier
- WC = Wild card
- LL = Lucky loser
- Alt = Alternate
- SE = Special exempt
- PR = Protected ranking
- ITF = ITF entry
- JE = Junior exempt
- w/o = Walkover
- r = Retired
- d = Defaulted
- SR = Special ranking

=== Draw ===
First round
1	(Italy) Flavio Cipolla (Italy) Simone Vagnozzi	6	6
(Belgium) Ruben Bemelmans (Czech Republic) Dušan Lojda	3	2
(United States) Brendan Evans (Austria) Martin Slanar	5	7	[10]
(Serbia) Ilija Bozoljac (New Zealand) Daniel King-Turner	7	5	[3]
3/WC	(Italy) Marco Crugnola (Italy) Uros Vico	2	3
WC	(Germany) Florian Mayer (Germany) Tobias Summerer	6	6
(United States) Lester Cook (South Korea) Kyu-tae Im	6	6
(United States) Alex Kuznetsov (United States) Michael Yani	2	3
(France) Jonathan Dasnières de Veigy (France) Vincent Millot	2	3
(France) Nicolas Devilder (France) Édouard Roger-Vasselin	6	6
WC	(France) Guillaume Monot (France) Mathieu Monot	2	2
4	(Bulgaria) Grigor Dimitrov (France) Alexandre Sidorenko	6	6
(Croatia) Roko Karanušić (Netherlands) Igor Sijsling	6	1	[8]
(France) Josselin Ouanna (France) David Guez	4	6	[10]
(Germany) Simon Stadler (Slovenia) Grega Žemlja	3	3
2	(South Africa) Kevin Anderson (United States) Brian Battistone	6	6

Quarterfinals
1	(Italy) F Cipolla (Italy) S Vagnozzi	w/o
(United States) B Evans (Austria) M Slanar
WC	(Germany) F Mayer (Germany) T Summerer	7^{7}	6
(United States) L Cook (South Korea) KT Im	6^{3}	4
(France) N Devilder (France) É Roger-Vasselin	4	6	[11]
4	(Bulgaria) G Dimitrov (France) A Sidorenko	6	2	[9]
(France) J Ouanna (France) D Guez	6	3	[10]
2	(South Africa) K Anderson (United States) B Battistone	3	6	[8]

Semifinals
1	(Italy) F Cipolla (Italy) S Vagnozzi	6	6
WC	(Germany) F Mayer (Germany) T Summerer	2	1
(France) N Devilder (France) É Roger-Vasselin	7	6
(France) J Ouanna (France) D Guez	5	3

Finals
1	(Italy) F Cipolla (Italy) S Vagnozzi	7	2	[8]
(France) N Devilder (France) É Roger-Vasselin	5	6	[10]
