= 2012 French Open =

- Date: 27 May – 11 June 2012
- Edition: 111
- Category: 82nd Grand Slam (ITF)
- Surface: Clay
- Location: Paris (XVI^{e}), France
- Venue: Stade Roland Garros
- Attendance: 430,093

Champions

Men's singles
- (Spain) Rafael Nadal

Women's singles
- (Russia) Maria Sharapova

Men's doubles
- (Belarus) Max Mirnyi / (Canada) Daniel Nestor

Women's doubles
- (Italy) Sara Errani / (Italy) Roberta Vinci

Mixed doubles
- (India) Sania Mirza / (India) Mahesh Bhupathi

Wheelchair men's singles
- (France) Stéphane Houdet

Wheelchair women's singles
- (Netherlands) Esther Vergeer

Wheelchair men's doubles
- (France) Frédéric Cattanéo / (Japan) Shingo Kunieda

Wheelchair women's doubles
- (Netherlands) Marjolein Buis / (Netherlands) Esther Vergeer

Boys' singles
- (Belgium) Kimmer Coppejans

Girls' singles
- (Germany) Annika Beck

Boys' doubles
- (Australia) Andrew Harris / (Australia) Nick Kyrgios

Girls' doubles
- (Russia) Daria Gavrilova / (Russia) Irina Khromacheva

Legends under 45 doubles
- (Spain) Albert Costa / (Spain) Carlos Moyá

Women's legends doubles
- (United States) Lindsay Davenport / (Switzerland) Martina Hingis

Legends over 45 doubles
- (United States) John McEnroe / (United States) Patrick McEnroe
- French Open

The 2012 French Open (also known as Roland Garros, after the famous French aviator) was a tennis tournament played on outdoor clay courts. It was the 111th edition of the French Open, and took place at the Stade Roland Garros from 27 May until 11 June 2012.

Rafael Nadal won the tournament for the third year in succession, and the seventh time in eight years, defeating first-time Roland Garros finalist Novak Djokovic. His seventh title broke Björn Borg's record of six French Open Men's Singles titles, and equalled Chris Evert's record for most French Open titles won by a man or woman. Li Na was unsuccessful in her title defence, being defeated in the fourth round by Yaroslava Shvedova. Maria Sharapova defeated 21st seed Sara Errani in the final to win her first French Open title, to complete a career Grand Slam, and to return to the World No. 1 ranking for the first time in four years.

This championship was the second time in grand slam history that two multiple slam sets were accomplished in two different disciplines, and that was Mahesh Bhupathi won his first multiple slam in Mixed Doubles, and Esther Vergeer won her second multiple slam set in Women's Wheelchair Doubles. At the 1969 US Open, Rod Laver won his first multiple slam set in Men's Singles, and his fellow countryman Ken Rosewall did in Men's Doubles for the first time. This would occur again for the third time at the 2013 French Open.

== Tournament ==
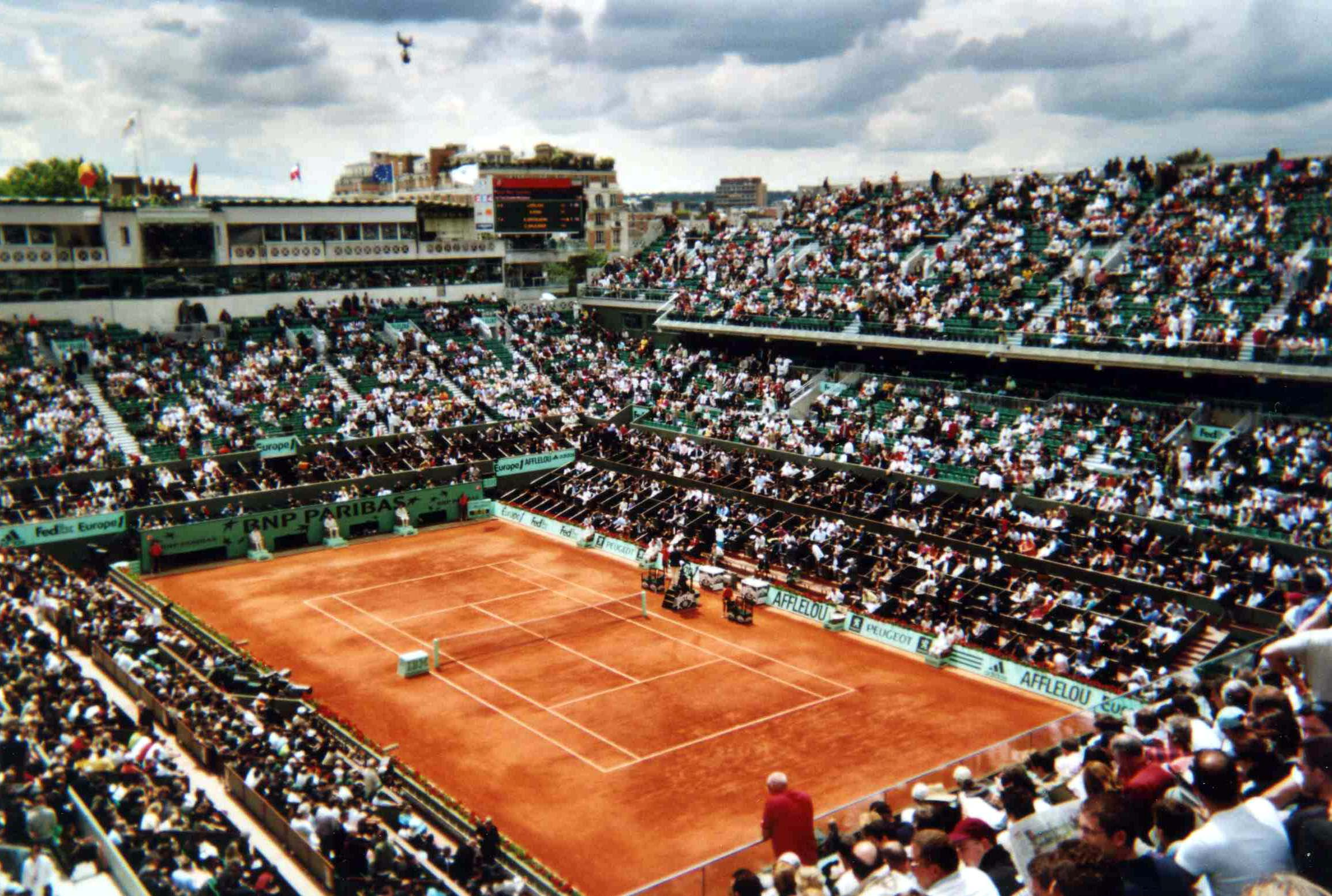
Court Philippe Chatrier where the Finals of the French Open take place.

The 2012 French Open was the one hundred and eleventh edition of the French Open and was held at Stade Roland Garros in Paris. The Men's Singles final was won by Rafael Nadal by defeating Novak Djokovic in the final. By winning his seventh title at Roland Garros, Nadal surpassed Borg's overall titles record to become the most successful tennis player in French Open history. The tournament was an event run by the International Tennis Federation (ITF) and is part of the 2012 ATP World Tour and the 2012 WTA Tour calendars under the Grand Slam category. The tournament consisted of both men's and women's singles and doubles draws as well as a mixed doubles event.

There was a singles and doubles events for both boys and girls (players under 18), which is part of the Grade A category of tournaments, and singles and doubles events for men's and women's wheelchair tennis players as part of the NEC tour under the Grand Slam category. The tournament was played on clay courts and took place over a series of twenty courts, including the three main showcourts, Court Philippe Chatrier, Court Suzanne Lenglen and Court 1.

== Prize money and ranking points ==
For 2012, the prize money purse was increased to €18,718,000 from €17,520,000 in 2011. The prize money and points breakdown is as follows:

=== Points ===
==== Seniors ====
Event	W	F	SF	QF	Round of 16	Round of 32	Round of 64	Round of 128	Q	Q3	Q2	Q1
Men's singles	2000	1200	720	360	180	90	45	10	25	16	8	0
Men's doubles	2000	1200	720	360	180	90	0	–	–	–	–	–
Women's singles	2000	1400	900	500	280	160	100	5	60	50	40	2
Women's doubles	2000	1400	900	500	280	160	5	–	–	–	–	–

==== Junior ====
Below is a table charting the points that are available to the boys and girls in boy singles and doubles play.

Stage	Boys' singles	Boys' doubles	Girls' singles	Girls' doubles
Champion	250	180	250	180
Runner up	180	120	180	120
Semifinals	120	80	120	80
Quarterfinals	80	50	80	50
Round of 16	50	30	50	30
Round of 32	30	–	30	–
Qualifier who loses in first round	25	–	25	–
Qualifying final round	20	–	20	–

==== Wheelchair ====
Stage	Men's singles	Men's doubles	Women's singles	Women's doubles
Champion	800			
Runner up	500			
Semifinals	375	100	375	100
Quarterfinals	100	–	100	–

=== Prize money ===
Event	W	F	SF	QF	Round of 16	Round of 32	Round of 64	Round of 128	Q3	Q2	Q1
Singles	€1,250,000	€625,000	€310,000	€155,000	€80,000	€47,000	€28,000	€18,000	€9,000	€4,500	€2,500
Doubles *	€340,000	€170,000	€85,000	€43,000	€23,000	€12,000	€8,000	–	–	–	–
Mixed doubles *	€100,000	€50,000	€25,000	€13,000	€7,000	€3,500	–	–	–	–	–
Wheelchair singles	€15,000	€7,500	€4,000	€2,500	–	–	–	–	–	–	–
Wheelchair doubles *	€5,000	€2,500	€1,500	–	–	–	–	–	–	–	–

_{* per team}

== Singles players ==
Men's singles

Champion		Runner-up	
(Spain) Rafael Nadal [2]		(Serbia) Novak Djokovic [1]	
Semifinals out
(Spain) David Ferrer [6]		(Switzerland) Roger Federer [3]	
Quarterfinals out
(France) Jo-Wilfried Tsonga [5]	(Argentina) Juan Martín del Potro [9]	(United Kingdom) Andy Murray [4]	(Spain) Nicolás Almagro [12]
4th round out
(Italy) Andreas Seppi [22]	(Switzerland) Stanislas Wawrinka [18]	(Belgium) David Goffin [LL]	(Czech Republic) Tomáš Berdych [7]
(Spain) Marcel Granollers [20]	(France) Richard Gasquet [17]	(Serbia) Janko Tipsarević [8]	(Argentina) Juan Mónaco [13]
3rd round out
(France) Nicolas Devilder (Q)	(Spain) Fernando Verdasco [14]	(France) Gilles Simon [11]	(Italy) Fabio Fognini
(France) Nicolas Mahut	(Poland) Łukasz Kubot	(Croatia) Marin Čilić [21]	(South Africa) Kevin Anderson [31]
(Russia) Mikhail Youzhny [27]	(France) Paul-Henri Mathieu [WC]	(Germany) Tommy Haas (Q)	(Colombia) Santiago Giraldo
(France) Julien Benneteau [29]	(Argentina) Leonardo Mayer	(Canada) Milos Raonic [19]	(Argentina) Eduardo Schwank (Q)
2nd round out
(Slovenia) Blaž Kavčič	(Germany) Michael Berrer (Q)	(Kazakhstan) Mikhail Kukushkin	(Luxembourg) Gilles Müller
(United States) Brian Baker (WC)	(Spain) Pablo Andújar	(Serbia) Victor Troicki [28]	(Germany) Cedrik-Marcel Stebe
(Romania) Adrian Ungur	(Slovakia) Martin Kližan	(France) Arnaud Clément (WC)	(France) Florent Serra (Q)
(France) Édouard Roger-Vasselin	(Spain) Juan Carlos Ferrero	(Argentina) Horacio Zeballos (Q)	(France) Michaël Llodra
(France) Benoît Paire	(Netherlands) Robin Haase	(Tunisia) Malek Jaziri	(United States) John Isner [10]
(Ukraine) Sergiy Stakhovsky	(Bulgaria) Grigor Dimitrov	(Australia) Bernard Tomic [25]	(Finland) Jarkko Nieminen
(France) Jérémy Chardy	(Russia) Dmitry Tursunov	(Germany) Philipp Kohlschreiber [24]	(Cyprus) Marcos Baghdatis
(Czech Republic) Lukáš Rosol	(United States) Jesse Levine (Q)	(Germany) Florian Mayer [32]	(Uzbekistan) Denis Istomin
1st round out
(Italy) Potito Starace	(Australia) Lleyton Hewitt (WC)	(Serbia) Filip Krajinović (Q)	(Austria) Jürgen Melzer [30]
(Russia) Nikolay Davydenko	(Latvia) Ernests Gulbis	(Netherlands) Igor Sijsling (Q)	(Belgium) Steve Darcis
(United States) Ryan Harrison	(Belgium) Xavier Malisse	(Romania) Victor Hănescu	(Italy) Flavio Cipolla
(Brazil) Thomaz Bellucci	(France) Adrian Mannarino (WC)	(Brazil) João Souza	(Russia) Andrey Kuznetsov
(Germany) Tobias Kamke	(Argentina) David Nalbandian	(Canada) Frank Dancevic	(United States) Andy Roddick [26]
(Czech Republic) Radek Štěpánek [23]	(Russia) Alex Bogomolov Jr.	(Slovakia) Karol Beck	(Spain) Feliciano López [15]
(Spain) Albert Montañés	(Canada) Vasek Pospisil	(France) Jonathan Dasnières de Veigy (WC)	(Spain) Daniel Muñoz de la Nava (Q)
(Portugal) Rui Machado	(Argentina) Éric Prodon	(Spain) Guillermo García López	(Israel) Dudi Sela
(Slovakia) Lukáš Lacko	(Spain) Albert Ramos	(Croatia) Ivan Dodig	(United States) James Blake
(Portugal) João Sousa (Q)	(Germany) Philipp Petzschner	(Germany) Björn Phau	(Brazil) Rogério Dutra da Silva
(Ukraine) Alexandr Dolgopolov [16]	(Italy) Filippo Volandri	(Estonia) Jürgen Zopp (Q)	(United States) Donald Young
(Austria) Andreas Haider-Maurer (Q)	(Colombia) Alejandro Falla	(Russia) Igor Andreev	(Japan) Tatsuma Ito
(United States) Sam Querrey	(Chinese Taipei) Lu Yen-hsun	(Japan) Go Soeda	(Germany) Mischa Zverev (Q)
(Australia) Matthew Ebden	(Belgium) Olivier Rochus	(Argentina) Juan Ignacio Chela	(Italy) Paolo Lorenzi
(France) Guillaume Rufin (WC)	(Argentina) Carlos Berlocq	(Germany) Benjamin Becker (PR)	(Spain) Rubén Ramírez Hidalgo
(Spain) Daniel Gimeno Traver	(Croatia) Ivo Karlović	(Russia) Igor Kunitsyn	(Italy) Simone Bolelli

Women's singles

Champion		Runner-up	
(Russia) Maria Sharapova [2]		(Italy) Sara Errani [21]	
Semifinals out
(Australia) Samantha Stosur [6]		(Czech Republic) Petra Kvitová [4]	
Quarterfinals out
(Slovakia) Dominika Cibulková [15]	(Germany) Angelique Kerber [10]	(Kazakhstan) Yaroslava Shvedova [Q]	(Estonia) Kaia Kanepi [23]
4th round out
(Belarus) Victoria Azarenka [1]	(United States) Sloane Stephens	(Russia) Svetlana Kuznetsova [26]	(Croatia) Petra Martić
(China) Li Na [7]	(United States) Varvara Lepchenko	(Netherlands) Arantxa Rus	(Czech Republic) Klára Zakopalová
3rd round out
(Canada) Aleksandra Wozniak	(Spain) María José Martínez Sánchez	(France) Mathilde Johansson	(Russia) Nadia Petrova [27]
(Poland) Agnieszka Radwańska [3]	(Serbia) Ana Ivanovic [13]	(Italy) Flavia Pennetta [18]	(Spain) Anabel Medina Garrigues [29]
(United States) Christina McHale	(Spain) Carla Suárez Navarro	(Italy) Francesca Schiavone [14]	(Russia) Nina Bratchikova
(Germany) Julia Görges [25]	(Denmark) Caroline Wozniacki [9]	(Russia) Anastasia Pavlyuchenkova [22]	(China) Peng Shuai [28]
2nd round out
(Germany) Dinah Pfizenmaier (Q)	(China) Zheng Jie [31]	(Czech Republic) Lucie Šafářová [20]	(United States) Vania King
(United States) Bethanie Mattek-Sands	(Czech Republic) Petra Cetkovská [24]	(South Africa) Chanelle Scheepers	(United States) Irina Falconi
(United States) Venus Williams	(Chinese Taipei) Chan Yung-jan (Q)	(United States) Melanie Oudin (WC)	(Israel) Shahar Pe'er
(Belarus) Olga Govortsova	(United States) Alexa Glatch (Q)	(France) Irena Pavlovic (WC)	(France) Marion Bartoli [8]
(France) Stéphanie Foretz Gacon	(United States) Lauren Davis (Q)	(Sweden) Sofia Arvidsson	(Kazakhstan) Sesil Karatantcheva (LL)
(Bulgaria) Tsvetana Pironkova	(Serbia) Jelena Janković [19]	(France) Claire Feuerstein (WC)	(Poland) Urszula Radwańska
(France) Virginie Razzano	(United Kingdom) Heather Watson (Q)	(Romania) Irina-Camelia Begu	(Australia) Jarmila Gajdošová
(Russia) Maria Kirilenko [16]	(Hungary) Melinda Czink	(Spain) Lourdes Domínguez Lino	(Japan) Ayumi Morita
1st round out
(Italy) Alberta Brianti	(France) Caroline Garcia (WC)	(Canada) Heidi El Tabakh (Q)	(France) Alizé Cornet
(Belarus) Anastasiya Yakimova	(Czech Republic) Eva Birnerová (Q)	(Kazakhstan) Galina Voskoboeva	(France) Kristina Mladenovic (WC)
(Germany) Sabine Lisicki [12]	(Russia) Ekaterina Makarova	(Australia) Anastasia Rodionova	(Romania) Simona Halep
(Czech Republic) Iveta Benešová	(Spain) Laura Pous Tió	(Romania) Edina Gallovits-Hall	(United Kingdom) Elena Baltacha
(Serbia) Bojana Jovanovski	(Argentina) Paula Ormaechea	(Ukraine) Kateryna Bondarenko	(Croatia) Mirjana Lučić
(Australia) Casey Dellacqua	(Sweden) Johanna Larsson	(Canada) Stéphanie Dubois	(Spain) Lara Arruabarrena Vecino (Q)
(China) Zhang Shuai	(Switzerland) Romina Oprandi	(Georgia (country)) Anna Tatishvili	(Chinese Taipei) Hsieh Su-wei
(United Kingdom) Laura Robson (LL)	(Chinese Taipei) Chang Kai-chen	(Netherlands) Michaëlla Krajicek	(Czech Republic) Karolína Plíšková (Q)
(Romania) Sorana Cîrstea	(Czech Republic) Barbora Záhlavová-Strýcová	(Netherlands) Kiki Bertens (Q)	(Germany) Mona Barthel [30]
(Italy) Roberta Vinci [17]	(Luxembourg) Mandy Minella	(Thailand) Tamarine Tanasugarn	(Hungary) Tímea Babos
(Japan) Kimiko Date-Krumm	(Belgium) Yanina Wickmayer	(Kazakhstan) Ksenia Pervak	(Austria) Patricia Mayr-Achleitner
(Romania) Monica Niculescu [32]	(Russia) Vera Dushevina	(France) Pauline Parmentier	(Australia) Ashleigh Barty (WC)
(United States) Serena Williams [5]	(United States) Jamie Hampton	(Russia) Elena Vesnina	(Czech Republic) Lucie Hradecká
(Russia) Alexandra Panova	(France) Aravane Rezaï (WC)	(Slovakia) Magdaléna Rybáriková	(Greece) Eleni Daniilidou
(France) Victoria Larrière (WC)	(Ukraine) Lesia Tsurenko	(United Kingdom) Anne Keothavong	(Hungary) Gréta Arn
(Austria) Tamira Paszek	(New Zealand) Marina Erakovic	(Slovenia) Polona Hercog	(Romania) Alexandra Cadanțu

== Events ==
=== Seniors ===
==== Men's singles ====
(Spain) Rafael Nadal defeated (Serbia) Novak Djokovic 6–4, 6–3, 2–6, 7–5

*It was Nadal's eleventh career Grand Slam title and his 7th title at French Open. It was his 4th title of the year, 50th title overall.

==== Women's singles ====
(Russia) Maria Sharapova defeated (Italy) Sara Errani, 6–3, 6–2

*It was Sharapova's fourth career Grand Slam title and her 1st title at French Open.

==== Men's doubles ====
(Belarus) Max Mirnyi / (Canada) Daniel Nestor defeated (United States) Bob Bryan / (United States) Mike Bryan, 6–4, 6–4

*It was Mirnyi's sixth career Grand Slam doubles title and his 4th title at French Open.
*It was Nestor's eighth career Grand Slam doubles title and his 4th title at French Open.

==== Women's doubles ====
(Italy) Sara Errani / (Italy) Roberta Vinci defeated (Russia) Maria Kirilenko / (Russia) Nadia Petrova, 4–6, 6–4, 6–2

*It was Errani and Vinci's first career Grand Slam doubles title.

==== Mixed doubles ====
(India) Sania Mirza / (India) Mahesh Bhupathi defeated (Poland) Klaudia Jans-Ignacik / (Mexico) Santiago González, 7–6^{(7–3)}, 6–1

*It was Mirza's second career Grand Slam mixed doubles title and her 1st title at French Open.
*It was Bhupathi's eight career Grand Slam mixed doubles title and his 3rd title at French Open.

=== Juniors ===
==== Boys' singles ====
(Belgium) Kimmer Coppejans defeated (Canada) Filip Peliwo 6–1, 6–4

==== Girls' singles ====
(Germany) Annika Beck defeated (Slovakia) Anna Karolína Schmiedlová, 3–6, 7–5, 6–3

==== Boys' doubles ====
(Australia) Andrew Harris / (Australia) Nick Kyrgios defeated (Czech Republic) Adam Pavlásek / (Czech Republic) Václav Šafránek, 6–4, 2–6, [10–7]

==== Girls' doubles ====
(Russia) Daria Gavrilova / (Russia) Irina Khromacheva defeated (Paraguay) Montserrat González / (Brazil) Beatriz Haddad Maia, 4–6, 6–4, [10–8]

=== Wheelchair events ===
==== Wheelchair men's singles ====
(France) Stéphane Houdet defeated (Japan) Shingo Kunieda, 6–2, 2–6, 7–6^{(8–6)}

==== Wheelchair women's singles ====
(Netherlands) Esther Vergeer defeated (Netherlands) Aniek van Koot, 6–0, 6–0

==== Wheelchair men's doubles ====
(France) Frédéric Cattanéo / (Japan) Shingo Kunieda defeated (France) Michaël Jérémiasz / (Sweden) Stefan Olsson, 3–6, 7–6^{(7–3)}, [10–6]

==== Wheelchair women's doubles ====
(Netherlands) Marjolein Buis / (Netherlands) Esther Vergeer defeated (Germany) Sabine Ellerbrock / (Japan) Yui Kamiji, 6–0, 6–1

=== Other events ===
==== Legends under 45 doubles ====
(Spain) Albert Costa / (Spain) Carlos Moyá defeated (Sweden) Thomas Enqvist / (Australia) Todd Woodbridge, 6–2, 6–1

==== Legends over 45 doubles ====
(United States) John McEnroe / (United States) Patrick McEnroe defeated (France) Guy Forget / (France) Henri Leconte, 7–6^{(7–5)}, 6–3

==== Women's legends doubles ====
(United States) Lindsay Davenport / (Switzerland) Martina Hingis defeated (United States) Martina Navratilova / (Czech Republic) Jana Novotná, 6–4, 6–4

== Singles seeds ==
The following are the seeded players and notable players who withdrew from the event. Seedings based on ATP and WTA rankings are as of 21 May 2012, Rankings and Points are as of 28 May 2012.

Because the tournament takes place one week later than in 2011, points defending includes results from both the 2011 French Open and tournaments from the week of 6 June 2011 (Halle and London for men; Birmingham and Copenhagen for women).

=== Men's singles ===
Seed	Rank	Player	Points before	Points defending	Points won	Points after	Status
1	1	(Serbia) Novak Djokovic	11,800	720	1,200	12,280	Runner-up, lost to (Spain) Rafael Nadal [2]
2	2	(Spain) Rafael Nadal	10,060	2,000+45	2,000+45	10,060	Champion, defeated (Serbia) Novak Djokovic [1]
3	3	(Switzerland) Roger Federer	9,790	1,200	720	9,310	Semifinals lost to (Serbia) Novak Djokovic [1]
4	4	(United Kingdom) Andy Murray	7,500	720+250	360+90	6,980	Quarterfinals lost to (Spain) David Ferrer [6]
5	5	(France) Jo-Wilfried Tsonga	4,965	90+150	360+145	5,230	Quarterfinals lost to (Serbia) Novak Djokovic [1]
6	6	(Spain) David Ferrer	4,640	180	720	5,180	Semifinals lost to (Spain) Rafael Nadal [2]
7	7	(Czech Republic) Tomáš Berdych	4,515	10+90	180+90	4,685	Fourth round lost to (Argentina) Juan Martín del Potro [9]
8	8	(Serbia) Janko Tipsarević	3,110	90+20	180+20	3,200	Fourth round lost to (Spain) Nicolás Almagro [12]
9	9	(Argentina) Juan Martín del Potro	2,910	90+20	360+20	3,180	Quarterfinals lost to (Switzerland) Roger Federer [3]
10	11	(United States) John Isner	2,620	10	45	2,655	Second round lost to (France) Paul-Henri Mathieu [WC]
11	12	(France) Gilles Simon	2,615	180+10	90+10	2,525	Third round lost to (Switzerland) Stan Wawrinka [18]
12	13	(Spain) Nicolás Almagro	2,255	10	360	2,605	Quarterfinals lost to (Spain) Rafael Nadal [2]
13	15	(Argentina) Juan Mónaco	1,945	10	180	2,115	Fourth round lost to (Spain) Rafael Nadal [2]
14	16	(Spain) Fernando Verdasco	1,765	90+45	90+45	1,765	Third round lost to (Italy) Andreas Seppi [22]
15	17	(Spain) Feliciano López	1,725	10+10	10+10	1,725	First round retired against (France) Florent Serra [Q]
16	19	(Ukraine) Alexandr Dolgopolov	1,665	90+20	10+20	1,585	First round lost to (Ukraine) Sergiy Stakhovsky
17	20	(France) Richard Gasquet	1,600	180	180	1,600	Fourth round lost to (United Kingdom) Andy Murray [4]
18	21	(Switzerland) Stan Wawrinka	1,505	180+10	180+10	1,505	Fourth round lost to (France) Jo-Wilfried Tsonga [5]
19	22	(Canada) Milos Raonic	1,460	10+45	90+45	1,540	Third round lost to (Argentina) Juan Mónaco [13]
20	23	(Spain) Marcel Granollers	1,385	45	180	1,520	Fourth round lost to (Spain) David Ferrer [6]
21	24	(Croatia) Marin Čilić	1,380	10+45	90+45	1,460	Third round lost to (Argentina) Juan Martín del Potro [9]
22	25	(Italy) Andreas Seppi	1,355	45+20	180+20	1,490	Fourth round lost to (Serbia) Novak Djokovic [1]
23	27	(Czech Republic) Radek Štěpánek	1,340	10+20	10+20	1,340	First round lost to (Belgium) David Goffin [LL]
24	26	(Germany) Philipp Kohlschreiber	1,345	10+250	45+45	1,175	Second round lost to (Argentina) Leonardo Mayer
25	29	(Australia) Bernard Tomic	1,240	10	45	1,275	Second round lost to (Colombia) Santiago Giraldo
26	30	(United States) Andy Roddick	1,225	0+90	10+45	1,190	First round lost to (France) Nicolas Mahut
27	31	(Russia) Mikhail Youzhny	1,210	90	90	1,210	Third round lost to (Spain) David Ferrer [6]
28	28	(Serbia) Viktor Troicki	1,325	180+45	45+45	1,190	Second round lost to (Italy) Fabio Fognini
29	32	(France) Julien Benneteau	1,190	45	90	1,235	Third round lost to (Serbia) Janko Tipsarević [8]
30	33	(Austria) Jürgen Melzer	1,182	45	10	1,147	First round lost to (Germany) Michael Berrer [Q]
31	34	(South Africa) Kevin Anderson	1,170	45+20	90+20	1,215	Third round lost to (Czech Republic) Tomáš Berdych [7]
32	35	(Germany) Florian Mayer	1,150	45+45	45+115	1,230	Second round lost to (Argentina) Eduardo Schwank [Q]

The following players would have been seeded, but they withdrew from the tournament.

Rank	Player	Points before	Points defending	Points won	Points after	Reason
10	(United States) Mardy Fish	2,625	90	0	2,535	Cardiac Catheter Ablation
14	(France) Gaël Monfils	2,165	360+90	0+90	1,805	Right knee injury
18	(Japan) Kei Nishikori	1,690	45	0	1,645	Stomach injury

=== Women's singles ===
Seed	Rank	Player	Points before	Points defending	Points won	Points after	Status
1	1	(Belarus) Victoria Azarenka	9,020	500	280	8,800	Fourth round lost to (Slovakia) Dominika Cibulková [15]
2	2	(Russia) Maria Sharapova	8,390	900	2,000	9,490	Champion, defeated (Italy) Sara Errani [21]
3	3	(Poland) Agnieszka Radwańska	7,350	280	160	7,230	Third round lost to (Russia) Svetlana Kuznetsova [26]
4	4	(Czech Republic) Petra Kvitová	6,275	280	900	6,895	Semifinals lost to (Russia) Maria Sharapova [2]
5	5	(United States) Serena Williams	5,695	0	5	5,700	First round lost to (France) Virginie Razzano
6	6	(Australia) Samantha Stosur	5,440	160	900	6,180	Semifinals lost to (Italy) Sara Errani [21]
7	7	(China) Li Na	4,965	2,000	280	3,245	Fourth round lost to (Kazakhstan) Yaroslava Shvedova [Q]
8	8	(France) Marion Bartoli	4,870	900	100	4,070	Second round lost to (Croatia) Petra Martić
9	9	(Denmark) Caroline Wozniacki	4,586	160+280	160+60	4,366	Third round lost to (Estonia) Kaia Kanepi [23]
10	10	(Germany) Angelique Kerber	3,560	5	500	4,055	Quarterfinals lost to (Italy) Sara Errani [21]
~~11~~	~~11~~	~~(Russia) Vera Zvonareva~~	3,440	280	0	3,160	Withdrew because of shoulder injury
12	13	(Germany) Sabine Lisicki	3,012	160+280	5+125	2,697	First round lost to (United States) Bethanie Mattek-Sands
13	14	(Serbia) Ana Ivanovic	2,975	5+130	160+75	3,070	Third round lost to (Italy) Sara Errani [21]
14	12	(Italy) Francesca Schiavone	3,160	1,400	160	1,920	Third round lost to (United States) Varvara Lepchenko
15	16	(Slovakia) Dominika Cibulková	2,685	5	500	3,180	Quarterfinals lost to (Australia) Samantha Stosur [6]
16	17	(Russia) Maria Kirilenko	2,475	280	100	2,295	Second round lost to (Czech Republic) Klára Zakopalová
17	19	(Italy) Roberta Vinci	2,320	160	5	2,165	First round lost to (Sweden) Sofia Arvidsson
18	20	(Italy) Flavia Pennetta	2,315	5	160	2,470	Third round lost to (Germany) Angelique Kerber [10]
19	21	(Serbia) Jelena Janković	2,260	280	100	2,080	Second round lost to (United States) Varvara Lepchenko
20	22	(Czech Republic) Lucie Šafářová	2,215	100+200	100+70	2,085	Second round lost to (Spain) María José Martínez Sánchez
21	24	(Italy) Sara Errani	2,050	100+30	1,400+30	3,350	Runner-up, lost to (Russia) Maria Sharapova [2]
22	25	(Russia) Anastasia Pavlyuchenkova	2,021	500	160	1,681	Third round lost to (Czech Republic) Klára Zakopalová
23	23	(Estonia) Kaia Kanepi	2,179	160	500	2,519	Quarterfinals lost to (Russia) Maria Sharapova [2]
24	26	(Czech Republic) Petra Cetkovská	1,955	70+110	100+70	1,945	Second round lost to (France) Mathilde Johansson
25	27	(Germany) Julia Görges	1,945	160	160	1,945	Third round lost to (Netherlands) Arantxa Rus
26	28	(Russia) Svetlana Kuznetsova	1,931	500	280	1,711	Fourth round lost to (Italy) Sara Errani [21]
27	29	(Russia) Nadia Petrova	1,860	5	160	2,015	Third round lost to (Australia) Samantha Stosur [6]
28	30	(China) Peng Shuai	1,800	160+130	160+60	1,730	Third round lost to (Russia) Maria Sharapova [2]
29	31	(Spain) Anabel Medina Garrigues	1,775	100	160	1,835	Third round lost to (Croatia) Petra Martić
30	32	(Germany) Mona Barthel	1,762	160+146	5+55	1,511	First round lost to (United States) Lauren Davis [Q]
31	34	(China) Zheng Jie	1,730	100	100	1,730	Second round lost to (Canada) Aleksandra Wozniak
32	33	(Romania) Monica Niculescu	1,745	5+40	5+30	1,735	First round lost to (Russia) Nina Bratchikova

The following players would have been seeded, but they withdrew from the tournament.

Rank	Player	Points before	Points defending	Points won	Points after	Reason
15	(Germany) Andrea Petkovic	2,921	500	0	2,421	Right ankle injury
18	(Slovakia) Daniela Hantuchová	2,355	280+200	0+75	1,950	Left foot injury

== Main draw wildcard entries ==
=== Men's singles ===
- (United States) Brian Baker
- (France) Arnaud Clément
- (France) Jonathan Dasnières de Veigy
- (Australia) Lleyton Hewitt
- (France) Adrian Mannarino
- (France) Paul-Henri Mathieu
- (France) Éric Prodon
- (France) Guillaume Rufin

=== Women's singles ===
- (Australia) Ashleigh Barty
- (France) Claire Feuerstein
- (France) Caroline Garcia
- (France) Victoria Larrière
- (France) Kristina Mladenovic
- (United States) Melanie Oudin
- (France) Irena Pavlovic
- (France) Aravane Rezaï

=== Men's doubles ===
- (France) Arnaud Clément / (France) Kenny de Schepper
- (France) Olivier Charroin / (France) Stéphane Robert
- (France) Paul-Henri Mathieu / (France) Florent Serra
- (France) Marc Gicquel / (France) Édouard Roger-Vasselin
- (France) Adrian Mannarino / (France) Benoît Paire
- (France) Pierre-Hugues Herbert / (France) Albano Olivetti
- (France) Jonathan Dasnières de Veigy / (France) Nicolas Renavand

=== Women's doubles ===
- (France) Irena Pavlovic / (France) Aravane Rezaï
- (France) Alizé Cornet / (France) Virginie Razzano
- (France) Caroline Garcia / (France) Mathilde Johansson
- (France) Claire Feuerstein / (France) Victoria Larrière
- (France) Iryna Brémond / (France) Sophie Lefèvre
- (France) Séverine Beltrame / (France) Laura Thorpe
- (France) Julie Coin / (France) Pauline Parmentier

=== Mixed doubles ===
- (France) Mathilde Johansson / (France) Marc Gicquel
- (France) Stéphanie Foretz Gacon / (France) Édouard Roger-Vasselin
- (France) Julie Coin / (France) Nicolas Mahut
- (France) Amandine Hesse / (France) Michaël Llodra
- (France) Virginie Razzano / (France) Nicolas Devilder
- (France) Pauline Parmentier / (France) Benoît Paire

== Qualifiers ==
=== Men's singles qualifiers ===
1. (United States) Jesse Levine
2. (Argentina) Eduardo Schwank
3. (Estonia) Jürgen Zopp
4. (Austria) Andreas Haider-Maurer
5. (Serbia) Filip Krajinović
6. (Russia) Andrey Kuznetsov
7. (Netherlands) Igor Sijsling
8. (Argentina) Horacio Zeballos
9. (Portugal) João Sousa
10. (France) Florent Serra
11. (Germany) Tommy Haas
12. (Germany) Michael Berrer
13. (Germany) Mischa Zverev
14. (Spain) Daniel Muñoz de la Nava
15. (France) Nicolas Devilder
16. (Brazil) Rogério Dutra Silva

The following player received entry as a lucky loser:

1. (Belgium) David Goffin

=== Women's singles qualifiers ===
1. (Netherlands) Kiki Bertens
2. (Chinese Taipei) Chan Yung-jan
3. (Kazakhstan) Yaroslava Shvedova
4. (United States) Alexa Glatch
5. (United Kingdom) Heather Watson
6. (Czech Republic) Eva Birnerová
7. (Germany) Dinah Pfizenmaier
8. (Canada) Heidi El Tabakh
9. (United States) Lauren Davis
10. (Spain) Lara Arruabarrena
11. (Czech Republic) Karolína Plíšková
12. (China) Zhang Shuai

The following players received entry as a lucky losers:

1. (United Kingdom) Laura Robson
2. (Kazakhstan) Sesil Karatantcheva

== Protected ranking ==
The following players were accepted directly into the main draw using a protected ranking:

Men's singles

- (Germany) Benjamin Becker

== Withdrawals ==
The following players were accepted directly into the main tournament, but withdrew with injuries or personal reasons.

Men's singles

- (Uruguay) Pablo Cuevas → replaced by (Slovenia) Blaž Kavčič
- (United States) Mardy Fish → replaced by (Canada) Frank Dancevic
- (France) Gaël Monfils → replaced by (Belgium) David Goffin
- (Japan) Kei Nishikori → replaced by (Slovakia) Karol Beck
- (Spain) Pere Riba → replaced by (Italy) Simone Bolelli
- (Sweden) Robin Söderling → replaced by (Spain) Daniel Gimeno Traver

Women's singles

- (Switzerland) Timea Bacsinszky → replaced by (Argentina) Paula Ormaechea
- (Belgium) Kim Clijsters → replaced by (Croatia) Mirjana Lučić-Baroni
- (Romania) Alexandra Dulgheru → replaced by (Russia) Nina Bratchikova
- (Slovakia) Daniela Hantuchová → replaced by (Spain) Laura Pous Tió
- (Germany) Andrea Petkovic → replaced by (Ukraine) Lesia Tsurenko
- (Spain) Sílvia Soler Espinosa → replaced by (United Kingdom) Laura Robson
- (Hungary) Ágnes Szávay → replaced by (France) Mathilde Johansson
- (Russia) Vera Zvonareva → replaced by (Kazakhstan) Sesil Karatantcheva

Preceded by 2012 Australian Open	Grand Slam Tournaments	Succeeded by 2012 Wimbledon Championships
