= 2010 Internationaux de Nouvelle-Calédonie =

- Date: January 3 – January 10
- Edition: 7th

Champions

Singles
- (Germany) Florian Mayer

Doubles
- (France) Nicolas Devilder / (France) Édouard Roger-Vasselin
← 2009 ·	Internationaux de Nouvelle-Calédonie	· 2011 →

The 2010 Internationaux de Nouvelle-Calédonie was a professional tennis tournament played on outdoor hard courts. It was part of the 2010 ATP Challenger Tour. It took place in Nouméa, New Caledonia between 3 and 10 January 2010.

== Singles main-draw entrants ==
=== Seeds ===
Country	Player	Rank^{1}	Seed
GER	Florian Mayer	61	1
FRA	Josselin Ouanna	130	2
USA	Brendan Evans	137	3
FRA	David Guez	146	4
FRA	Édouard Roger-Vasselin	153	5
ITA	Flavio Cipolla	159	6
RSA	Kevin Anderson	161	7
USA	Michael Yani	164	8

- Rankings are as of December 28, 2009

=== Other entrants ===
The following players received wildcards into the singles main draw:

- (Bulgaria) Grigor Dimitrov
- (United States) Ryan Harrison
- (New Zealand) Daniel King-Turner
- (France) Nicolas N'Godrela

The following players received entry from the qualifying draw:

- (Australia) Leon Frost
- (Italy) Simone Vagnozzi
- (Australia) Dane Propoggia
- (Austria) Martin Slanar

== Champions ==
=== Singles ===
- (Germany) Florian Mayer def. (Italy) Flavio Cipolla, 6–3, 6–0.

=== Doubles ===
- (France) Nicolas Devilder / (France) Édouard Roger-Vasselin def. (Italy) Flavio Cipolla / (Italy) Simone Vagnozzi, 5–7, 6–2, [10-8].
