= 2011 Internationaux de Nouvelle-Calédonie – Singles =

Singles
- 2011 Internationaux de Nouvelle-Calédonie

Final
- Champion: (France) Vincent Millot
- Runner-up: (Luxembourg) Gilles Müller
- Score: 7–6^{(8–6)}, 2–6, 6–4

Events
Singles	Doubles
← 2010 ·	Internationaux de Nouvelle-Calédonie	· 2012 →

Florian Mayer was the defending champion, but chose not to defend his title.
Unseeded Vincent Millot defeated No. 3 seed Gilles Müller in the final, 7–6^{(8–6)}, 2–6, 6–4.

== Seeds ==
1. (Netherlands) Igor Sijsling (first round)
2. (Netherlands) Jesse Huta Galung (semifinals, withdrew)
3. (Luxembourg) Gilles Müller (final)
4. (France) Marc Gicquel (first round)
5. (France) Benoît Paire (first round)
6. (France) Josselin Ouanna (quarterfinals)
7. (France) David Guez (second round)
8. (Italy) Simone Vagnozzi (second round)

== Draw ==
=== Key ===
- Q = Qualifier
- WC = Wild card
- LL = Lucky loser
- Alt = Alternate
- ITF = ITF entry
- PR = Protected ranking
- SR = Special ranking
- SE = Special exempt
- JE = Junior exempt
- JR = Junior Accelerator Programme entrant
- CO = College Accelerator Programme entrant
- NG = Next Gen Accelerator Program entrant
- w/o = Walkover
- r = Retired
- d = Defaulted

=== Finals ===
Semifinals
(France) Augustin Gensse	3	3
3	(Luxembourg) Gilles Müller	6	6
(France) Vincent Millot	w/o
2	(Netherlands) Jesse Huta Galung

Final
3	(Luxembourg) Gilles Müller	6^{6}	6	4
(France) Vincent Millot	7^{8}	2	6

=== Top half ===
First round
1	(Netherlands) Igor Sijsling	7	4	4
(France) Augustin Gensse	5	6	6
(United States) Kevin Kim	7^{7}	3	4
(Denmark) Frederik Nielsen	6^{4}	6	6
(France) Romain Jouan	6^{8}	3
(Slovakia) Pavol Červenák	7^{10}	6
(Germany) Sebastian Rieschick	6	6
5	(France) Benoît Paire	1	1
3	(Luxembourg) Gilles Müller	4	7	7^{7}
PR	(Thailand) Danai Udomchoke	6	5	6^{5}
WC	(France) Charles-Antoine Brézac	4	6^{2}
WC	(France) Clément Reix	6	7^{7}
(Italy) M Viola	5	4
(Italy) Flavio Cipolla	7	6
Q	(South Africa) Fritz Wolmarans	1	4
7	(France) David Guez	6	6

Second round
(France) A Gensse	6	6
(Denmark) F Nielsen	4	2
(Slovakia) P Červenák	6	7^{7}
(Germany) S Rieschick	1	6^{1}
3	(Luxembourg) G Müller	4	6	6
WC	(France) C Reix	6	1	4
(Italy) F Cipolla	6	6
7	(France) D Guez	1	0

Quarterfinals
(France) A Gensse	7^{8}	6
(Slovakia) P Červenák	6^{6}	4
3	(Luxembourg) G Müller	6	1	6
(Italy) F Cipolla	3	6	3

Semifinals
(France) A Gensse	3	4
3	(Luxembourg) G Müller	6	6

=== Bottom half ===
First round
6	(France) Josselin Ouanna	6	6
Q	(United States) Michael Yani	3	4
Q	(Germany) Dominik Meffert	6^{1}	6^{1}
(South Africa) Rik de Voest	7^{7}	7^{7}
(France) Olivier Patience	6	3	3
Q	(Israel) Amir Weintraub	1	6	6
(France) Vincent Millot	6	7
4	(France) Marc Gicquel	3	5
8	(Italy) Simone Vagnozzi	6	6
WC	(France) Nicolas N'Godrela	4	1
(France) Laurent Rochette	3	2
(France) G Burquier	6	6
(France) Laurent Recouderc	3	3
(Slovakia) Ivo Klec	6	6
WC	(France) Florian Reynet	3	4
2	(Netherlands) Jesse Huta Galung	6	6

Second round
6	(France) J Ouanna	6	6
(South Africa) R de Voest	2	4
Q	(Israel) A Weintraub	6	5	5
(France) V Millot	3	7	7
8	(Italy) S Vagnozzi	3	3
(France) G Burquier	6	6
(Slovakia) I Klec	4	4
2	(Netherlands) J Huta Galung	6	6

Quarterfinals
6	(France) J Ouanna	6	6^{0}	6^{2}
(France) V Millot	3	7^{7}	7^{7}
(France) G Burquier	4	5
2	(Netherlands) J Huta Galung	6	7

Semifinals
(France) V Millot	w/o
2	(Netherlands) J Huta Galung
