= 2012 French Open – Women's singles =

Women's singles
- 2012 French Open

Final
- Champion: (Russia) Maria Sharapova
- Runner-up: (Italy) Sara Errani
- Score: 6–3, 6–2

Events
Singles	men	women		boys	girls
Doubles	men	women	mixed	boys	girls
WC Singles	men	women	quad
WC Doubles	men	women	quad
Legends	−45	45+	women
- French Open

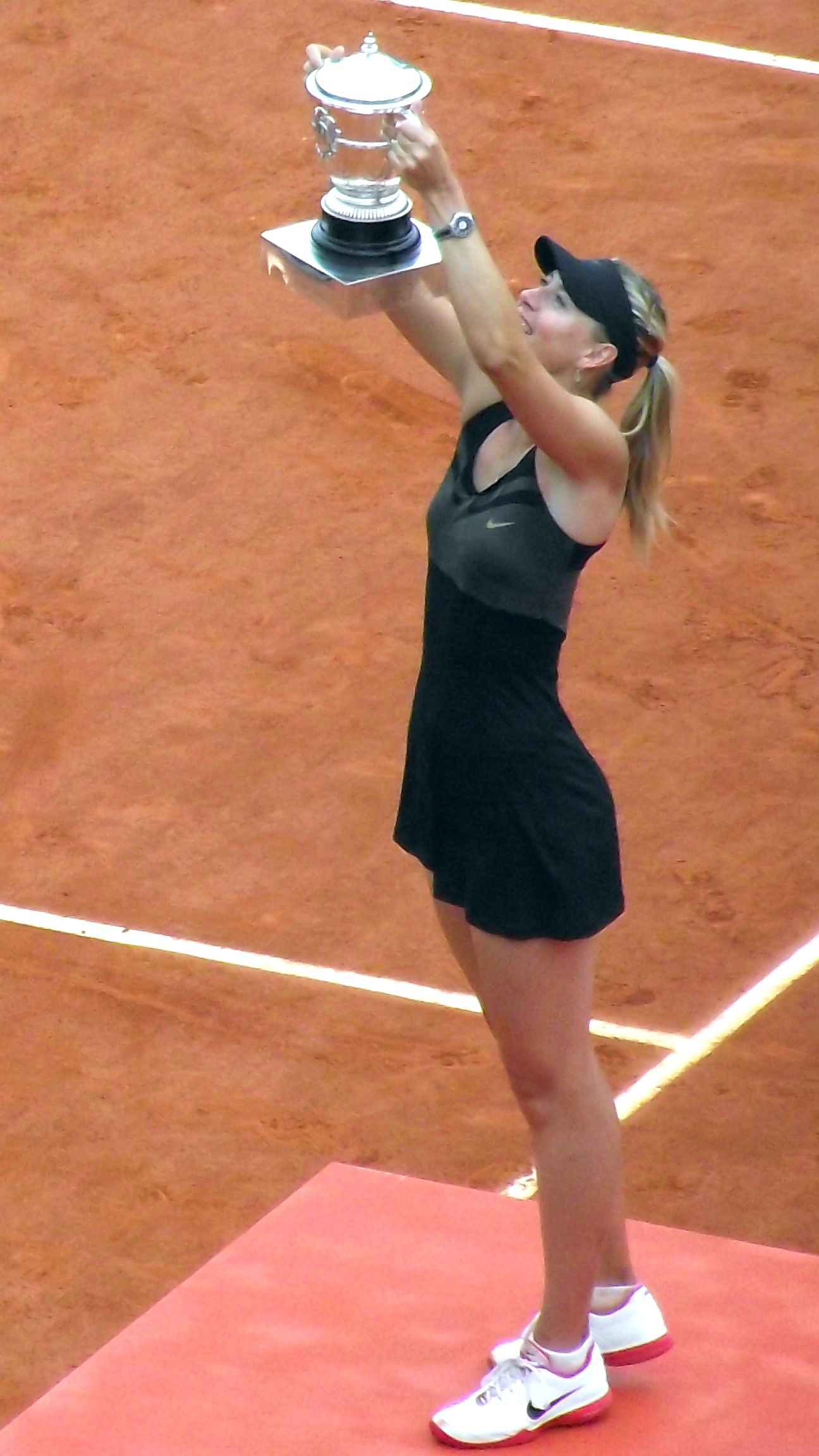
Maria Sharapova with the Suzanne-Lenglen Cup

Maria Sharapova defeated Sara Errani in the final, 6–3, 6–2 to win the women's singles tennis title at the 2012 French Open. It was her first French Open title and fourth major title overall, completing the career Grand Slam. It was her first major title since a significant shoulder surgery four years prior. Sharapova regained the world No. 1 singles ranking with the win; Victoria Azarenka and Agnieszka Radwańska were also in contention for the top position.

Li Na was the defending champion, but lost in the fourth round to qualifier Yaroslava Shvedova: the first time a defending champion was defeated by a qualifier in the tournament's history.

The tournament was notable for one of the biggest upsets in French Open history as world No. 111 Virginie Razzano defeated world No. 5 and 2002 champion Serena Williams in the first round, despite Williams being two points from victory at 5–1 in the second-set tiebreaker. Razzano was only the second player ranked outside the top 100 (after Sun Tiantian at the 2005 China Open) to defeat Williams in a WTA Tour-level main draw match. It was Williams' first loss in the first round of a major, going 46–0 heading into this match. Williams had lost in second round of a major just once, to her sister Venus Williams at the 1998 Australian Open.

This tournament marked the major main-draw debut of future world No. 1 Karolína Plíšková. She lost to Marion Bartoli in the first round.

== Seeds ==
1. (Belarus) Victoria Azarenka (fourth round)
2. (Russia) Maria Sharapova (champion)
3. (Poland) Agnieszka Radwańska (third round)
4. (Czech Republic) Petra Kvitová (semifinals)
5. (United States) Serena Williams (first round)
6. (Australia) Samantha Stosur (semifinals)
7. (China) Li Na (fourth round)
8. (France) Marion Bartoli (second round)
9. (Denmark) Caroline Wozniacki (third round)
10. (Germany) Angelique Kerber (quarterfinals)
11. (Russia) Vera Zvonareva (withdrew because of a right shoulder injury)
12. (Germany) Sabine Lisicki (first round)
13. (Serbia) Ana Ivanovic (third round)
14. (Italy) Francesca Schiavone (third round)
15. (Slovakia) Dominika Cibulková (quarterfinals)
16. (Russia) Maria Kirilenko (second round)

17. (Italy) Roberta Vinci (first round)
18. (Italy) Flavia Pennetta (third round)
19. (Serbia) Jelena Janković (second round)
20. (Czech Republic) Lucie Šafářová (second round)
21. (Italy) Sara Errani (final)
22. (Russia) Anastasia Pavlyuchenkova (third round)
23. (Estonia) Kaia Kanepi (quarterfinals)
24. (Czech Republic) Petra Cetkovská (second round)
25. (Germany) Julia Görges (third round)
26. (Russia) Svetlana Kuznetsova (fourth round)
27. (Russia) Nadia Petrova (third round)
28. (China) Peng Shuai (third round)
29. (Spain) Anabel Medina Garrigues (third round)
30. (Germany) Mona Barthel (first round)
31. (China) Zheng Jie (second round)
32. (Romania) Monica Niculescu (first round)

Click on the seed number of a player to go to their draw section.

== Draw ==
Key

- Q = Qualifier
- WC = Wild card
- LL = Lucky loser
- Alt = Alternate
- ITF = ITF entry
- PR = Protected ranking
- SR = Special ranking
- SE = Special exempt
- JE = Junior exempt
- JR = Junior Accelerator Programme entrant
- CO = College Accelerator Programme entrant
- NG = Next Gen Accelerator Program entrant
- w/o = Walkover
- r = Retired
- d = Defaulted

=== Finals ===
Quarterfinals
15	(Slovakia) Dominika Cibulková	4	1
6	(Australia) Samantha Stosur	6	6
21	(Italy) Sara Errani	6	7^{7}
10	(Germany) Angelique Kerber	3	6^{2}
Q	(Kazakhstan) Yaroslava Shvedova	6	2	4
4	(Czech Republic) Petra Kvitová	3	6	6
23	(Estonia) Kaia Kanepi	2	3
2	(Russia) Maria Sharapova	6	6

Semifinals
6	(Australia) Samantha Stosur	5	6	3
21	(Italy) Sara Errani	7	1	6
4	(Czech Republic) Petra Kvitová	3	3
2	(Russia) Maria Sharapova	6	6

Final
21	(Italy) Sara Errani	3	2
2	(Russia) Maria Sharapova	6	6

=== Top half ===
==== Section 1 ====
First round
1	(Belarus) V Azarenka	6^{6}	6	6
(Italy) A Brianti	7^{8}	4	2
WC	(France) C Garcia	6	4	3
Q	(Germany) D Pfizenmaier	3	6	6
Q	(Canada) H El Tabakh	5	2
(Canada) A Wozniak	7	6
(France) A Cornet	4	4
31	(China) J Zheng	6	6
20	(Czech Republic) L Šafářová	6	6
(Belarus) A Yakimova	2	0
(Spain) MJ Martínez Sánchez	4	6	8
Q	(Czech Republic) E Birnerová	6	4	6
(United States) V King	6	6
(Kazakhstan) G Voskoboeva	4	2
WC	(France) K Mladenovic	2	1
15	(Slovakia) D Cibulková	6	6

Second round
1	(Belarus) V Azarenka	6	6
Q	(Germany) D Pfizenmaier	1	1
(Canada) A Wozniak	6	6
31	(China) J Zheng	2	4
20	(Czech Republic) L Šafářová	4	5
(Spain) MJ Martínez Sánchez	6	7
(United States) V King	0	2
15	(Slovakia) D Cibulková	6	6

Third round
1	(Belarus) V Azarenka	6	6
(Canada) A Wozniak	4	4
(Spain) MJ Martínez Sánchez	2	1
15	(Slovakia) D Cibulková	6	6

Fourth round
1	(Belarus) V Azarenka	2	6^{4}
15	(Slovakia) D Cibulková	6	7^{7}

==== Section 2 ====
First round
12	(Germany) S Lisicki	4	3
(United States) B Mattek-Sands	6	6
(Russia) E Makarova	4	6^{6}
(United States) S Stephens	6	7^{8}
(France) M Johansson	5	7^{8}	6
(Australia) An Rodionova	7	6^{6}	4
(Romania) S Halep	1	3
24	(Czech Republic) P Cetkovská	6	6
27	(Russia) N Petrova	6	6
(Czech Republic) I Benešová	3	3
(Spain) L Pous Tió	4	6	1
(South Africa) C Scheepers	6	2	6
(United States) I Falconi	3	6	6
(Romania) E Gallovits-Hall	6	3	1
(United Kingdom) E Baltacha	4	0
6	(Australia) S Stosur	6	6

Second round
(United States) B Mattek-Sands	1	1
(United States) S Stephens	6	6
(France) M Johansson	7^{7}	6
24	(Czech Republic) P Cetkovská	6^{1}	2
27	(Russia) N Petrova	6	6
(South Africa) C Scheepers	3	3
(United States) I Falconi	1	4
6	(Australia) S Stosur	6	6

Third round
(United States) S Stephens	6	6
(France) M Johansson	3	2
27	(Russia) N Petrova	3	3
6	(Australia) S Stosur	6	6

Fourth round
(United States) S Stephens	5	4
6	(Australia) S Stosur	7	6

==== Section 3 ====
First round
3	(Poland) A Radwańska	6	6
(Serbia) B Jovanovski	1	0
(United States) V Williams	4	6	6
(Argentina) P Ormaechea	6	1	3
Q	(Chinese Taipei) Y-j Chan	6	7^{10}
(Ukraine) K Bondarenko	1	6^{8}
(Croatia) M Lučić-Baroni	1	3
26	(Russia) S Kuznetsova	6	6
21	(Italy) S Errani	4	6	6
(Australia) C Dellacqua	6	2	2
WC	(United States) M Oudin	6	6
(Sweden) J Larsson	3	3
(Canada) S Dubois	2	2
(Israel) S Pe'er	6	6
Q	(Spain) L Arruabarrena	1	1
13	(Serbia) A Ivanovic	6	6

Second round
3	(Poland) A Radwańska	6	6
(United States) V Williams	2	3
Q	(Chinese Taipei) Y-j Chan	4	6^{4}
26	(Russia) S Kuznetsova	6	7^{7}
21	(Italy) S Errani	6	6
WC	(United States) M Oudin	2	3
(Israel) S Pe'er	2	2
13	(Serbia) A Ivanovic	6	6

Third round
3	(Poland) A Radwańska	1	2
26	(Russia) S Kuznetsova	6	6
21	(Italy) S Errani	1	7	6
13	(Serbia) A Ivanovic	6	5	3

Fourth round
26	(Russia) S Kuznetsova	0	5
21	(Italy) S Errani	6	7

==== Section 4 ====
First round
10	(Germany) A Kerber	6	6
Q	(China) S Zhang	3	4
(Switzerland) R Oprandi	4	1
(Belarus) O Govortsova	6	6
(Georgia (country)) A Tatishvili	3	7	4
Q	(United States) A Glatch	6	5	6
(Chinese Taipei) S-w Hsieh	7^{7}	4	2
18	(Italy) F Pennetta	6^{3}	6	6
29	(Spain) A Medina Garrigues	6	6
LL	(United Kingdom) L Robson	2	1
(Chinese Taipei) K-c Chang	4	5
WC	(France) I Pavlovic	6	7
(Croatia) P Martić	6	7
(Netherlands) M Krajicek	2	5
Q	(Czech Republic) Ka Plíšková	3	3
8	(France) M Bartoli	6	6

Second round
10	(Germany) A Kerber	6	6
(Belarus) O Govortsova	3	2
Q	(United States) A Glatch	3	1
18	(Italy) F Pennetta	6	6
29	(Spain) A Medina Garrigues	6	6
WC	(France) I Pavlovic	3	2
(Croatia) P Martić	6	3	6
8	(France) M Bartoli	2	6	3

Third round
10	(Germany) A Kerber	4	6	6
18	(Italy) F Pennetta	6	3	2
29	(Spain) A Medina Garrigues	2	1
(Croatia) P Martić	6	6

Fourth round
10	(Germany) A Kerber	6	7
(Croatia) P Martić	3	5

=== Bottom half ===
==== Section 5 ====
First round
7	(China) N Li	6	6
(Romania) S Cîrstea	2	1
(Czech Republic) B Záhlavová-Strýcová	3	5
(France) S Foretz Gacon	6	7
(United States) C McHale	2	6	6
Q	(Netherlands) K Bertens	6	4	4
Q	(United States) L Davis	6	6
30	(Germany) M Barthel	1	1
17	(Italy) R Vinci	2	6	3
(Sweden) S Arvidsson	6	4	6
Q	(Kazakhstan) Y Shvedova	6	6
(Luxembourg) M Minella	3	4
(Thailand) T Tanasugarn	0	3
(Spain) C Suárez Navarro	6	6
(Hungary) T Babos	1	0
LL	(Kazakhstan) S Karatantcheva	6	6

Second round
7	(China) N Li	6	6
(France) S Foretz Gacon	0	2
(United States) C McHale	6	6
Q	(United States) L Davis	1	3
(Sweden) S Arvidsson	1	0
Q	(Kazakhstan) Y Shvedova	6	6
(Spain) C Suárez Navarro	4	6	6
LL	(Kazakhstan) S Karatantcheva	6	4	1

Third round
7	(China) N Li	3	6	6
(United States) C McHale	6	2	1
Q	(Kazakhstan) Y Shvedova	6	7
(Spain) C Suárez Navarro	4	5

Fourth round
7	(China) N Li	6	2	0
Q	(Kazakhstan) Y Shvedova	3	6	6

==== Section 6 ====
First round
14	(Italy) F Schiavone	6	6
(Japan) K Date-Krumm	3	1
(Bulgaria) T Pironkova	3	6	6
(Belgium) Y Wickmayer	6	0	3
(United States) V Lepchenko	6	6^{6}	6
(Kazakhstan) K Pervak	2	7^{8}	4
(Austria) P Mayr-Achleitner	6	1	5
19	(Serbia) J Janković	1	6	7
32	(Romania) M Niculescu	6	3	3
(Russia) N Bratchikova	0	6	6
(Russia) V Dushevina	4	1
WC	(France) C Feuerstein	6	6
(France) P Parmentier	4	3
(Poland) U Radwańska	6	6
WC	(Australia) A Barty	1	2
4	(Czech Republic) P Kvitová	6	6

Second round
14	(Italy) F Schiavone	2	6	6
(Bulgaria) T Pironkova	6	3	1
(United States) V Lepchenko	7^{7}	4	6
19	(Serbia) J Janković	6^{4}	6	4
(Russia) N Bratchikova	3	6	7
WC	(France) C Feuerstein	6	3	5
(Poland) U Radwańska	1	3
4	(Czech Republic) P Kvitová	6	6

Third round
14	(Italy) F Schiavone	6	3	6
(United States) V Lepchenko	3	6	8
(Russia) N Bratchikova	2	6	1
4	(Czech Republic) P Kvitová	6	4	6

Fourth round
(United States) V Lepchenko	2	1
4	(Czech Republic) P Kvitová	6	6

==== Section 7 ====
First round
5	(United States) S Williams	6	6^{5}	3
(France) V Razzano	4	7^{7}	6
(Netherlands) A Rus	6	4
(United States) J Hampton	4	3^{r}
(Russia) E Vesnina	2	4
Q	(United Kingdom) H Watson	6	6
(Czech Republic) L Hradecká	6^{1}	4
25	(Germany) J Görges	7^{7}	6
23	(Estonia) K Kanepi	6	6
(Russia) A Panova	3	3
(Romania) I-C Begu	7	5	6
WC	(France) A Rezaï	5	7	2
(Australia) J Gajdošová	6	4
(Slovakia) M Rybáriková	3	1^{r}
(Greece) E Daniilidou	0	1
9	(Denmark) C Wozniacki	6	6

Second round
(France) V Razzano	3	6^{3}
(Netherlands) A Rus	6	7^{7}
Q	(United Kingdom) H Watson	3	4
25	(Germany) J Görges	6	6
23	(Estonia) K Kanepi	6	6
(Romania) I-C Begu	4	1
(Australia) J Gajdošová	1	4
9	(Denmark) C Wozniacki	6	6

Third round
(Netherlands) A Rus	7^{7}	2	6
25	(Germany) J Görges	6^{5}	6	2
23	(Estonia) K Kanepi	6	6^{3}	6
9	(Denmark) C Wozniacki	1	7^{7}	3

Fourth round
(Netherlands) A Rus	1	6	0
23	(Estonia) K Kanepi	6	4	6

==== Section 8 ====
First round
16	(Russia) M Kirilenko	6	6
WC	(France) V Larrière	1	2
(Czech Republic) K Zakopalová	6	6
(Ukraine) L Tsurenko	2	1
(United Kingdom) A Keothavong	1	2
(Hungary) M Czink	6	6
(Hungary) G Arn	4	4
22	(Russia) A Pavlyuchenkova	6	6
28	(China) S Peng	6	6
(Austria) T Paszek	4	3
(New Zealand) M Erakovic	5	5
(Spain) L Domínguez Lino	7	7
(Slovenia) P Hercog	6	4	3
(Japan) A Morita	3	6	6
(Romania) A Cadanțu	0	0
2	(Russia) M Sharapova	6	6

Second round
16	(Russia) M Kirilenko	4	6	3
(Czech Republic) K Zakopalová	6	3	6
(Hungary) M Czink	6	3	3
22	(Russia) A Pavlyuchenkova	4	6	6
28	(China) S Peng	6	6
(Spain) L Domínguez Lino	4	3
(Japan) A Morita	1	1
2	(Russia) M Sharapova	6	6

Third round
(Czech Republic) K Zakopalová	6	7
22	(Russia) A Pavlyuchenkova	3	5
28	(China) S Peng	2	1
2	(Russia) M Sharapova	6	6

Fourth round
(Czech Republic) K Zakopalová	4	7^{7}	2
2	(Russia) M Sharapova	6	6^{5}	6

== Championship match statistics ==
Category	(Russia) Sharapova	(Italy) Errani
1st serve %	36/60 (60%)	48/61 (79%)
1st serve points won	25 of 36 = 69%	22 of 48 = 46%
2nd serve points won	12 of 24 = 50%	5 of 13 = 38%
Total service points won	37 of 60 = 61.67%	27 of 61 = 44.26%
Aces	6	0
Double faults	5	1
Winners	37	12
Unforced errors	29	11
Net points won	5 of 9 = 56%	6 of 10 = 60%
Break points converted	5 of 13 = 38%	2 of 5 = 40%
Return points won	34 of 61 = 56%	23 of 60 = 38%
Total points won	71	50

Preceded by 2012 Australian Open – Women's singles	Grand Slam women's singles	Succeeded by 2012 Wimbledon Championships – Women's singles
