= 2011 Internationaux de Nouvelle-Calédonie =

- Date: 3–9 January
- Edition: 8th
- Location: Nouméa, New Caledonia

Champions

Singles
- (France) Vincent Millot

Doubles
- (Germany) Dominik Meffert / (Denmark) Frederik Nielsen
← 2010 ·	Internationaux de Nouvelle-Calédonie	· 2012 →

The 2011 Internationaux de Nouvelle-Calédonie was a professional tennis tournament played on hard courts. It was the eighth edition of the tournament which is part of the 2011 ATP Challenger Tour. It took place in Nouméa, New Caledonia between 3 and 9 January 2011.

== Singles main-draw entrants ==
=== Seeds ===
Country	Player	Rank^{1}	Seed
NED	Igor Sijsling	126	1
NED	Jesse Huta Galung	128	2
LUX	Gilles Müller	134	3
FRA	Marc Gicquel	151	4
FRA	Benoît Paire	152	5
FRA	Josselin Ouanna	157	6
FRA	David Guez	169	7
ITA	Simone Vagnozzi	179	8

- Rankings are as of December 27, 2010.

=== Other entrants ===
The following players received wildcards into the singles main draw:

- (France) Charles-Antoine Brézac
- (France) Nicolas N'Godrela
- (France) Clément Reix
- (France) Florian Reynet

The following players received entry from the qualifying draw:

- (Germany) Dominik Meffert
- (Israel) Amir Weintraub
- (South Africa) Fritz Wolmarans
- (United States) Michael Yani

== Champions ==
=== Singles ===
(France) Vincent Millot def. (Luxembourg) Gilles Müller, 7–6^{(7–6)}, 2–6, 6–4

=== Doubles ===
(Germany) Dominik Meffert / (Denmark) Frederik Nielsen def. (Italy) Flavio Cipolla / (Italy) Simone Vagnozzi, 7–6^{(7–4)}, 5–7, [10–5]
