= 2012 French Open – Men's singles =

Men's singles
- 2012 French Open

Final
- Champion: (Spain) Rafael Nadal
- Runner-up: (Serbia) Novak Djokovic
- Score: 6–4, 6–3, 2–6, 7–5

Events
Singles	men	women		boys	girls
Doubles	men	women	mixed	boys	girls
WC Singles	men	women	quad
WC Doubles	men	women	quad
Legends	−45	45+	women
- French Open

Two-time defending champion Rafael Nadal defeated Novak Djokovic in the final, 6–4, 6–3, 2–6, 7–5 to win the men's singles tennis title at the 2012 French Open. It was his record-breaking seventh French Open title and eleventh major title overall, surpassing Björn Borg's Open Era record of six French Open men's singles titles and equaling Pete Sampras' Wimbledon record for men's singles titles at one major in the Open Era. He also equaled Chris Evert's all-gender record for the most French Open singles titles overall.

Djokovic was attempting to complete a non-calendar-year Grand Slam and to become the first man since Rod Laver in 1969 to hold all four major titles at once, having won the preceding Wimbledon Championships, US Open, and Australian Open (Djokovic would achieve the feat in 2016). Instead, it was Djokovic's fourth consecutive loss to Nadal at the French Open. Until this tournament, Djokovic had not won a set against Nadal in their three previous encounters at the French Open..

Roger Federer was attempting to become the first man in the Open Era and the third man ever to achieve a double career Grand Slam, but he lost to Djokovic in the semifinals in a rematch of the previous year's semifinal.

Due to rain, play in the final was delayed multiple times. At one point, Nadal led two sets to none and was up 2–0 in the third set. As the weather worsened, Djokovic won six straight games to take the third set and broke to lead in the fourth. The match was finally suspended until the following day, with Nadal ahead 6–4, 6–3, 2–6, 1–2 and Djokovic serving. When play resumed, Nadal won two straight games and six of the last nine.

David Goffin was the first lucky loser to reach the fourth round of a major since Dick Norman at the 1995 Wimbledon Championships.

This marked the last French Open appearance of 2003 champion and former world No. 1 Juan Carlos Ferrero.

== Seeds ==
1. (Serbia) Novak Djokovic (final)
2. (Spain) Rafael Nadal (champion)
3. (Switzerland) Roger Federer (semifinals)
4. (United Kingdom) Andy Murray (quarterfinals)
5. (France) Jo-Wilfried Tsonga (quarterfinals)
6. (Spain) David Ferrer (semifinals)
7. (Czech Republic) Tomáš Berdych (fourth round)
8. (Serbia) Janko Tipsarević (fourth round)
9. (Argentina) Juan Martín del Potro (quarterfinals)
10. (United States) John Isner (second round)
11. (France) Gilles Simon (third round)
12. (Spain) Nicolás Almagro (quarterfinals)
13. (Argentina) Juan Mónaco (fourth round)
14. (Spain) Fernando Verdasco (third round)
15. (Spain) Feliciano López (first round, retired because of a left oblique injury)
16. (Ukraine) Alexandr Dolgopolov (first round)

17. (France) Richard Gasquet (fourth round)
18. (Switzerland) Stan Wawrinka (fourth round)
19. (Canada) Milos Raonic (third round)
20. (Spain) Marcel Granollers (fourth round)
21. (Croatia) Marin Čilić (third round)
22. (Italy) Andreas Seppi (fourth round)
23. (Czech Republic) Radek Štěpánek (first round)
24. (Germany) Philipp Kohlschreiber (second round)
25. (Australia) Bernard Tomic (second round)
26. (United States) Andy Roddick (first round)
27. (Russia) Mikhail Youzhny (third round)
28. (Serbia) Viktor Troicki (second round)
29. (France) Julien Benneteau (third round)
30. (Austria) Jürgen Melzer (first round)
31. (South Africa) Kevin Anderson (third round)
32. (Germany) Florian Mayer (second round)

Click on the seed number of a player to go to their draw section.

== Draw ==
Key

- Q = Qualifier
- WC = Wild card
- LL = Lucky loser
- Alt = Alternate
- ITF = ITF entry
- PR = Protected ranking
- SR = Special ranking
- SE = Special exempt
- JE = Junior exempt
- JR = Junior Accelerator Programme entrant
- CO = College Accelerator Programme entrant
- NG = Next Gen Accelerator Program entrant
- w/o = Walkover
- r = Retired
- d = Defaulted

=== Finals ===
Quarterfinals
1	(Serbia) Novak Djokovic	6	5	5	7^{8}	6
5	(France) Jo-Wilfried Tsonga	1	7	7	6^{6}	1
3	(Switzerland) Roger Federer	3	6^{4}	6	6	6
9	(Argentina) Juan Martín del Potro	6	7^{7}	2	0	3
6	(Spain) David Ferrer	6	6^{3}	6	6
4	(United Kingdom) Andy Murray	4	7^{7}	3	2
12	(Spain) Nicolás Almagro	6^{4}	2	3
2	(Spain) Rafael Nadal	7^{7}	6	6

Semifinals
1	(Serbia) Novak Djokovic	6	7	6
3	(Switzerland) Roger Federer	4	5	3
6	(Spain) David Ferrer	2	2	1
2	(Spain) Rafael Nadal	6	6	6

Final
1	(Serbia) Novak Djokovic	4	3	6	5
2	(Spain) Rafael Nadal	6	6	2	7

=== Top half ===
==== Section 1 ====
First round
1	(Serbia) N Djokovic	7^{7}	6	6
(Italy) P Starace	6^{3}	3	1
(Slovenia) B Kavčič	7^{7}	6	6^{4}	6
WC	(Australia) L Hewitt	6^{2}	3	7^{7}	3
Q	(Serbia) F Krajinović	2	2	0
Q	(France) N Devilder	6	6	6
Q	(Germany) M Berrer	6^{5}	4	6	6	6
30	(Austria) J Melzer	7^{7}	6	2	2	3
22	(Italy) A Seppi	6	7^{7}	7
(Russia) N Davydenko	3	6^{5}	5
(Kazakhstan) M Kukushkin	6	7^{7}	5	2	6
(Latvia) E Gulbis	4	6^{4}	7	6	4
Q	(Netherlands) I Sijsling	6	5	6	4	6
(Luxembourg) G Müller	2	7	3	6	8
(Belgium) S Darcis	3	2	6^{4}
14	(Spain) F Verdasco	6	6	7^{7}

Second round
1	(Serbia) N Djokovic	6	6	6
(Slovenia) B Kavčič	0	4	4
Q	(France) N Devilder	7^{7}	6	6
Q	(Germany) M Berrer	6^{5}	4	2
22	(Italy) A Seppi	6^{5}	6	2	6	6
(Kazakhstan) M Kukushkin	7^{7}	2	6	1	2
(Luxembourg) G Müller	7^{7}	3	2	2
14	(Spain) F Verdasco	6^{5}	6	6	6

Third round
1	(Serbia) N Djokovic	6	6	6
Q	(France) N Devilder	1	2	2
22	(Italy) A Seppi	7	3	6	4	6
14	(Spain) F Verdasco	5	6	3	6	2

Fourth round
1	(Serbia) N Djokovic	4	6^{5}	6	7	6
22	(Italy) A Seppi	6	7^{7}	3	5	3

==== Section 2 ====
First round
11	(France) G Simon	3	7	6	6
(United States) R Harrison	6	5	4	1
(Belgium) X Malisse	3	6^{1}	6^{5}
WC	(United States) B Baker	6	7^{7}	7^{7}
(Spain) P Andújar	6	2	1	6	6
(Romania) V Hănescu	1	6	6	3	1
(Italy) F Cipolla	3	3	6	6	2
18	(Switzerland) S Wawrinka	6	6	4	3	6
28	(Serbia) V Troicki	4	6	5	6	6
(Brazil) T Bellucci	6	3	7	3	2
(Italy) F Fognini	6	7	6
WC	(France) A Mannarino	0	5	1
(Germany) C-M Stebe	6	2
(Brazil) J Souza	3	0^{r}
Q	(Russia) A Kuznetsov	6	3	2	4
5	(France) J-W Tsonga	1	6	6	6

Second round
11	(France) G Simon	6	6	6^{4}	1	6
WC	(United States) B Baker	4	1	7^{7}	6	0
(Spain) P Andújar	6^{3}	7^{7}	2	1
18	(Switzerland) S Wawrinka	7^{7}	6^{4}	6	6
28	(Serbia) V Troicki	2	6	6	3	6
(Italy) F Fognini	6	3	4	6	8
(Germany) C-M Stebe	2	6	2	1
5	(France) J-W Tsonga	6	4	6	6

Third round
11	(France) G Simon	5	7^{7}	7^{7}	3	2
18	(Switzerland) S Wawrinka	7	6^{5}	6^{3}	6	6
(Italy) F Fognini	5	4	4
5	(France) J-W Tsonga	7	6	6

Fourth round
18	(Switzerland) S Wawrinka	4	6^{6}	6	6	4
5	(France) J-W Tsonga	6	7^{8}	3	3	6

==== Section 3 ====
First round
3	(Switzerland) R Federer	6	7	6
(Germany) T Kamke	2	5	3
(Romania) A Ungur	6	5	6	7
(Argentina) D Nalbandian	3	7	4	5
(Canada) F Dancevic	0^{r}
(Slovakia) M Kližan	4
(France) N Mahut	6	6	4	6
26	(United States) A Roddick	3	3	6	2
23	(Czech Republic) R Štěpánek	2	6	6	4	2
LL	(Belgium) D Goffin	6	4	2	6	6
WC	(France) A Clément	6	3	4	7^{7}	5
(Russia) A Bogomolov	2	6	6	6^{2}	4^{r}
(Slovakia) K Beck	5	2	5
(Poland) Ł Kubot	7	6	7
Q	(France) F Serra	5
15	(Spain) F López	0^{r}

Second round
3	(Switzerland) R Federer	6	6	6^{6}	6
(Romania) A Ungur	3	2	7^{8}	3
(Slovakia) M Kližan	6	4	6^{5}	3
(France) N Mahut	4	6	7^{7}	6
LL	(Belgium) D Goffin	3	7^{7}	0	6	6
WC	(France) A Clément	6	6^{2}	6	2	1
(Poland) Ł Kubot	7^{7}	6	7^{7}
Q	(France) F Serra	6^{0}	2	6^{4}

Third round
3	(Switzerland) R Federer	6	4	6	7
(France) N Mahut	3	6	2	5
LL	(Belgium) D Goffin	7^{7}	7	6
(Poland) Ł Kubot	6^{4}	5	1

Fourth round
3	(Switzerland) R Federer	5	7	6	6
LL	(Belgium) D Goffin	7	5	2	4

==== Section 4 ====
First round
9	(Argentina) JM del Potro	6	6^{5}	6	6
(Spain) A Montañés	2	7^{7}	2	1
(France) É Roger-Vasselin	3	6	6	6
(Canada) V Pospisil	6	3	2	2
(Spain) JC Ferrero	6	6	6
WC	(France) J Dasnières de Veigy	1	4	3
Q	(Spain) D Muñoz de la Nava	4	4	5
21	(Croatia) M Čilić	6	6	7
31	(South Africa) K Anderson	7^{7}	6^{6}	4	6	11
(Portugal) R Machado	6^{2}	7^{8}	6	1	9
WC	(France) É Prodon	7^{10}	3	3	2
Q	(Argentina) H Zeballos	6^{8}	6	6	6
(France) M Llodra	7^{7}	6	3	6
(Spain) G García López	6^{5}	2	6	3
(Israel) D Sela	3	4	1
7	(Czech Republic) T Berdych	6	6	6

Second round
9	(Argentina) JM del Potro	6^{5}	7^{7}	6	6
(France) É Roger-Vasselin	7^{7}	6^{3}	4	4
(Spain) JC Ferrero	6^{4}	2	3
21	(Croatia) M Čilić	7^{7}	6	6
31	(South Africa) K Anderson	6	3	6	6
Q	(Argentina) H Zeballos	3	6	3	0
(France) M Llodra	2	3	3
7	(Czech Republic) T Berdych	6	6	6

Third round
9	(Argentina) JM del Potro	6	7^{9}	6
21	(Croatia) M Čilić	3	6^{7}	1
31	(South Africa) K Anderson	4	6	7^{7}	4	4
7	(Czech Republic) T Berdych	6	3	6^{4}	6	6

Fourth round
9	(Argentina) JM del Potro	7^{8}	1	6	7
7	(Czech Republic) T Berdych	6^{6}	6	3	5

=== Bottom half ===
==== Section 5 ====
First round
6	(Spain) D Ferrer	6	6	6
(Slovakia) L Lacko	3	4	1
(France) B Paire	7^{7}	6	6^{5}	6
(Spain) A Ramos	6^{3}	4	7^{7}	3
(Croatia) I Dodig	2	2	1
(Netherlands) R Haase	6	6	6
(United States) J Blake	2	1	2
27	(Russia) M Youzhny	6	6	6
20	(Spain) M Granollers	6	3	6	6
Q	(Portugal) J Sousa	2	6	3	4
(Tunisia) M Jaziri	6	7	7^{9}
(Germany) P Petzschner	3	5	6^{7}
WC	(France) P-H Mathieu	2	4	6	6	6
(Germany) B Phau	6	6	4	3	0
Q	(Brazil) R Dutra Silva	3	4	4
10	(United States) J Isner	6	6	6

Second round
6	(Spain) D Ferrer	6	6	6
(France) B Paire	3	3	2
(Netherlands) R Haase	3	6^{5}	4
27	(Russia) M Youzhny	6	7^{7}	6
20	(Spain) M Granollers	7^{7}	3	6	3	7
(Tunisia) M Jaziri	6^{1}	6	1	6	5
WC	(France) P-H Mathieu	6^{2}	6	6	3	18
10	(United States) J Isner	7^{7}	4	4	6	16

Third round
6	(Spain) D Ferrer	6	6	6
27	(Russia) M Youzhny	0	2	2
20	(Spain) M Granollers	6	6	1	4	6
WC	(France) P-H Mathieu	4	4	6	6	1

Fourth round
6	(Spain) D Ferrer	6	6	6
20	(Spain) M Granollers	3	2	0

==== Section 6 ====
First round
16	(Ukraine) A Dolgopolov	7^{7}	4	6^{4}	6	3
(Ukraine) S Stakhovsky	6^{4}	6	7^{7}	3	6
(Italy) F Volandri	3	6	4	4
Q	(Germany) T Haas	6	0	6	6
(United States) D Young	6^{3}	1	1
(Bulgaria) G Dimitrov	7^{7}	6	6
Q	(Estonia) J Zopp	3	4	6^{4}
17	(France) R Gasquet	6	6	7^{7}
25	(Australia) B Tomic	7^{7}	6	6
Q	(Austria) A Haider-Maurer	6^{5}	3	3
(Colombia) S Giraldo	5	6	6	7^{7}
(Colombia) A Falla	7	2	4	6^{4}
(Finland) J Nieminen	3	6	2
(Russia) I Andreev	6	2	1^{r}
(Japan) T Ito	1	5	0
4	(United Kingdom) A Murray	6	7	6

Second round
(Ukraine) S Stakhovsky	2	3	2
Q	(Germany) T Haas	6	6	6
(Bulgaria) G Dimitrov	7	5	2	3
17	(France) R Gasquet	5	7	6	6
25	(Australia) B Tomic	4	1	3
(Colombia) S Giraldo	6	6	6
(Finland) J Nieminen	6	4	1	2
4	(United Kingdom) A Murray	1	6	6	6

Third round
Q	(Germany) T Haas	7^{7}	3	0	0
17	(France) R Gasquet	6^{3}	6	6	6
(Colombia) S Giraldo	3	4	4
4	(United Kingdom) A Murray	6	6	6

Fourth round
17	(France) R Gasquet	6	4	1	2
4	(United Kingdom) A Murray	1	6	6	6

==== Section 7 ====
First round
8	(Serbia) J Tipsarević	2	6	7^{7}	6
(United States) S Querrey	6	4	6^{3}	3
(France) J Chardy	6	6	6^{3}	3	11
(Chinese Taipei) Y-h Lu	4	1	7^{7}	6	9
(Russia) D Tursunov	6	6	6
(Japan) G Soeda	1	4	4
Q	(Germany) M Zverev	2	7^{7}	4	4
29	(France) J Benneteau	6	6^{3}	6	6
24	(Germany) P Kohlschreiber	6	6	7^{7}
(Australia) M Ebden	4	4	6^{4}
(Belgium) O Rochus	3	4	6	4
(Argentina) L Mayer	6	6	2	6
(Argentina) JI Chela	3	3	1
(Cyprus) M Baghdatis	6	6	6
(Italy) P Lorenzi	3	5	4
12	(Spain) N Almagro	6	7	6

Second round
8	(Serbia) J Tipsarević	7^{7}	6	7
(France) J Chardy	6^{4}	1	5
(Russia) D Tursunov	4	4	4
29	(France) J Benneteau	6	6	6
24	(Germany) P Kohlschreiber	6^{5}	6^{4}	5
(Argentina) L Mayer	7^{7}	7^{7}	7
(Cyprus) M Baghdatis	4	3	5
12	(Spain) N Almagro	6	6	7

Third round
8	(Serbia) J Tipsarević	6	7	6
29	(France) J Benneteau	3	5	4
(Argentina) L Mayer	4	1	2
12	(Spain) N Almagro	6	6	6

Fourth round
8	(Serbia) J Tipsarević	4	4	4
12	(Spain) N Almagro	6	6	6

==== Section 8 ====
First round
13	(Argentina) J Mónaco	6	2	6	7^{7}
WC	(France) G Rufin	2	6	2	6^{3}
(Czech Republic) L Rosol	6	7	6^{6}	6
(Argentina) C Berlocq	4	5	7^{8}	2
Q	(United States) J Levine	7	6	6
PR	(Germany) B Becker	5	2	4
(Spain) R Ramírez Hidalgo	4	2	2
19	(Canada) M Raonic	6	6	6
32	(Germany) F Mayer	6	6	6
(Spain) D Gimeno Traver	4	2	3
Q	(Argentina) E Schwank	6	6	6
(Croatia) I Karlović	4	0	3
(Russia) I Kunitsyn	2	1	2
(Uzbekistan) D Istomin	6	6	6
(Italy) S Bolelli	2	2	1
2	(Spain) R Nadal	6	6	6

Second round
13	(Argentina) J Mónaco	7^{7}	6	7^{7}
(Czech Republic) L Rosol	6^{4}	0	6^{5}
Q	(United States) J Levine	4	5	2
19	(Canada) M Raonic	6	7	6
32	(Germany) F Mayer	6	3	4	6^{4}
Q	(Argentina) E Schwank	2	6	6	7^{7}
(Uzbekistan) D Istomin	2	2	0
2	(Spain) R Nadal	6	6	6

Third round
13	(Argentina) J Mónaco	6^{5}	6	6^{5}	6	6
19	(Canada) M Raonic	7^{7}	3	7^{7}	3	4
Q	(Argentina) E Schwank	1	3	4
2	(Spain) R Nadal	6	6	6

Fourth round
13	(Argentina) J Mónaco	2	0	0
2	(Spain) R Nadal	6	6	6

Preceded by 2012 Australian Open – Men's singles	Grand Slam men's singles	Succeeded by 2012 Wimbledon Championships – Men's singles
