= 2012 Internationaux de Nouvelle-Calédonie =

- Date: 2–7 January
- Edition: 9th
- Location: Nouméa, New Caledonia

Champions

Singles
- (France) Jérémy Chardy

Doubles
- (Thailand) Sanchai Ratiwatana / (Thailand) Sonchat Ratiwatana
← 2011 ·	Internationaux de Nouvelle-Calédonie	· 2013 →

The 2012 Internationaux de Nouvelle-Calédonie was a professional tennis tournament played on hard courts. It was the ninth edition of the tournament which is part of the 2012 ATP Challenger Tour. It took place in Nouméa, New Caledonia between 2 and 8 January 2011.

== Singles main-draw entrants ==
=== Seeds ===
Country	Player	Rank^{1}	Seed
USA	Michael Russell	99	1
FRA	Jérémy Chardy	103	2
FRA	Kenny de Schepper	139	3
ESP	Daniel Muñoz de la Nava	140	4
FRA	Augustin Gensse	150	5
FRA	Arnaud Clément	153	6
ITA	Matteo Viola	156	7
BEL	Ruben Bemelmans	160	8

- ^{1} Rankings are as of December 26, 2012.

=== Other entrants ===
The following players received wildcards into the singles main draw:

- (France) Axel Michon
- (France) Nicolas N'Godrela
- (France) Ludovic Walter

The following players received entry from the qualifying draw:

- (Australia) Matthew Barton
- (Switzerland) Loic Perret
- (Canada) Peter Polansky
- (Germany) Eric Scherer

== Champions ==
=== Singles ===
(France) Jérémy Chardy def. (Spain) Adrián Menéndez, 6–4, 6–3

=== Doubles ===
(Thailand) Sanchai Ratiwatana / (Thailand) Sonchat Ratiwatana def. (France) Axel Michon / (France) Guillaume Rufin, 6–0, 6–4
