= 2012 Internationaux de Nouvelle-Calédonie – Singles =

Tennis contest held in New Caledonia

Singles
- 2012 Internationaux de Nouvelle-Calédonie

Final
- Champion: (France) Jérémy Chardy
- Runner-up: (Spain) Adrián Menéndez
- Score: 6–4, 6–3

Events
Singles	Doubles
- Internationaux de Nouvelle-Calédonie

Vincent Millot was the defending champion but decided not to participate.
Jérémy Chardy won the title after defeating Adrián Menéndez 6–4, 6–3 in the final.

== Seeds ==
1. (United States) Michael Russell (quarterfinals)
2. (France) Jérémy Chardy (champion)
3. (France) Kenny de Schepper (quarterfinals)
4. (Spain) Daniel Muñoz-de la Nava (first round)
5. (France) Augustin Gensse (first round)
6. (France) Arnaud Clément (first round)
7. (Italy) Matteo Viola (first round)
8. (Belgium) Ruben Bemelmans (quarterfinals)

== Draw ==
Key

- Q = Qualifier
- WC = Wild card
- LL = Lucky loser
- Alt = Alternate
- ITF = ITF entry
- PR = Protected ranking
- SR = Special ranking
- SE = Special exempt
- JE = Junior exempt
- JR = Junior Accelerator Programme entrant
- CO = College Accelerator Programme entrant
- NG = Next Gen Accelerator Program entrant
- w/o = Walkover
- r = Retired
- d = Defaulted

=== Finals ===
Semifinals
(Spain) Adrián Menéndez	7^{7}	6
(France) Florent Serra	6^{4}	3
8	(Belgium) Ruben Bemelmans	5	6^{4}
2	(France) Jérémy Chardy	7	7^{7}

Final
(Spain) Adrián Menéndez	4	3
2	(France) Jérémy Chardy	6	6

=== Top half ===
First round
1	(United States) M Russell	6	2	6
(Israel) A Weintraub	4	6	4
Q	(Canada) P Polansky	6	6
(Belarus) U Ignatik	2	2
WC	(France) L Walter	6	6
Q	(Germany) Eric Scherer	2	2
(Spain) A Menéndez	6	6^{5}	7
7	(Italy) M Viola	0	7^{7}	5
3	(France) K de Schepper	6	7
(Italy) S Vagnozzi	3	5
Q	(Switzerland) Loic Perret	0	1
(United States) M Yani	6	6
(France) F Serra	6	6
(France) M Teixeira	0	3
(France) G Rufin	6	6
5	(France) A Gensse	3	4

Second round
1	(United States) M Russell	3	6	6
Q	(Canada) P Polansky	6	2	3
WC	(France) L Walter	3	6^{4}
(Spain) A Menéndez	6	7^{7}
3	(France) K de Schepper	6	3	6
(United States) M Yani	3	6	4
(France) F Serra	3	6	7^{14}
(France) G Rufin	6	3	6^{12}

Quarterfinals
1	(United States) M Russell	6^{5}	6^{4}
(Spain) A Menéndez	7^{7}	7^{7}
3	(France) K de Schepper	1	4
(France) F Serra	6	6

Semifinals
(Spain) A Menéndez	7^{7}	6
(France) F Serra	6^{4}	3

=== Bottom half ===
First round
8	(Belgium) R Bemelmans	7^{17}	6
(France) M Rodrigues	6^{15}	3
WC	(France) Axel Michon	1	2
(Germany) S Rieschick	6	6
(Thailand) D Udomchoke	6^{4}	6	6
(Czech Republic) J Mertl	7^{7}	1	4
(France) D Guez	6	1	6
4	(Spain) D Muñoz-de la Nava	3	6	3
6	(France) A Clément	6	4	5
(France) Gregoire Burquier	2	6	7
(France) J Dasnières de Veigy	6	6
WC	(France) Nicolas N'Godrela	2	1
Q	(Australia) M Barton	4	5
(France) R Jouan	6	7
(Czech Republic) D Lojda	6	6^{3}	3
2	(France) J Chardy	3	7^{7}	6

Second round
8	(Belgium) R Bemelmans	6	6
(Germany) S Rieschick	4	2
(Thailand) D Udomchoke	2	3
(France) D Guez	6	6
(France) Gregoire Burquier	6	2	5
(France) J Dasnières de Veigy	3	6	7
(France) R Jouan	4	6	6^{6}
2	(France) J Chardy	6	3	7^{8}

Quarterfinals
8	(Belgium) R Bemelmans	6	6
(France) D Guez	2	1
(France) J Dasnières de Veigy	6^{4}	1
2	(France) J Chardy	7^{7}	6

Semifinals
8	(Belgium) R Bemelmans	5	6^{4}
2	(France) J Chardy	7	7^{7}
