= Nicolas Devilder =

French tennis player

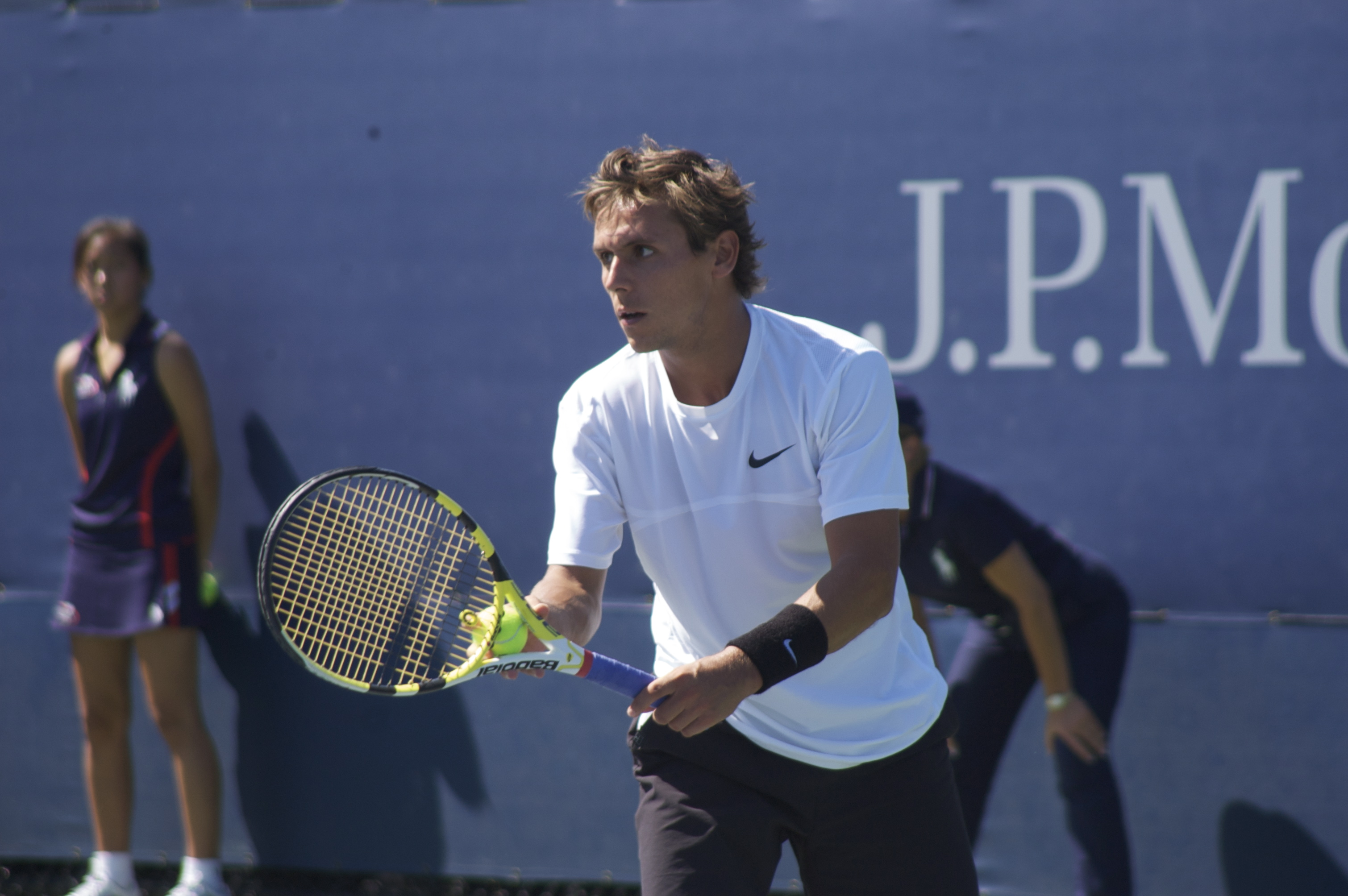
- Country (sports): France
- Residence: Boulogne-Billancourt, France
- Born: 25 March 1980 (age 45) Dax, France
- Height: 1.72 m (5 ft 8 in)
- Turned pro: 2000
- Retired: 2013
- Plays: Left-handed (two-handed backhand)
- Prize money: $959,449

Singles
- Career record: 24–47
- Career titles: 0
- Highest ranking: No. 60 (8 September 2008)

Grand Slam singles results
- Australian Open: 1R (2007, 2009)
- French Open: 3R (2012)
- Wimbledon: 2R (2007, 2009)
- US Open: 2R (2008)

Doubles
- Career record: 7–23
- Career titles: 1
- Highest ranking: No. 197 (23 March 2009)

Grand Slam doubles results
- Australian Open: 1R (2009)
- French Open: 2R (2005, 2008)
- Wimbledon: 1R (2007, 2009)
- US Open: 1R (2008)

Grand Slam mixed doubles results
- French Open: 2R (2012)
- Last updated on: 31 May 2021.

Nicolas Devilder (French: [nikɔla dəvildɛʁ]; born 25 March 1980) is a retired French tennis player.

Devilder reached a career high ATP singles ranking of World No. 60, achieved on 8 September 2008. He also reached a career high ATP doubles ranking of World No. 197, achieved on 23 March 2009.

Devilder played primarily in ATP Challenger tournaments, and has won Challenger titles in Pamplona, Monza, Bergamo, Košice, Timișoara and Poznań. He was sponsored by Nike and Babolat. At the 2012 French Open he strung together five consecutive wins all in straight sets, as he needed to come through three qualifying rounds to advance to the main draw, followed by winning his first and second round matches. He was eventually defeated in the third round by World No. 1 and eventual finalist Novak Djokovic 1–6, 2–6, 2–6.

Devilder reached 22 singles finals in his career, with a record of 14 wins and 8 losses which includes a 9–5 record in ATP Challenger finals. Additionally he reached ten career doubles finals in his career with a record of 5 wins and 5 losses which includes a 2–0 record in ATP Challenger finals. His only appearance in an ATP Tour-level final came in doubles at the 2008 Romanian Open on clay courts in Bucharest. In what was an extraordinarily even-leveled back and forth tight match lasting several hours, Devilder and compatriot partner Paul-Henri Mathieu defeated Polish pair Mariusz Fyrstenberg and Marcin Matkowski 7–6^{(7–4)}, 6–7^{(9–11)}, [22–20] to win the championship.

== ATP career finals ==
=== Doubles: 1 (1–0) ===
Legend Grand Slam Tournaments (0–0) ATP World Tour Finals (0–0) ATP World Tour Masters 1000 (0–0) ATP World Tour 500 Series (0–0) ATP World Tour 250 Series (1–0)	Finals by surface Hard (0–0) Clay (1–0) Grass (0–0) Carpet (0–0)

Result	W–L	Date	Tournament	Surface	Partner	Opponents	Score
Win	1–0	Sep 2008	Bucharest, Romania	Clay	(France) Paul-Henri Mathieu	(Poland) Mariusz Fyrstenberg (Poland) Marcin Matkowski	7–6^{(7–4)}, 6–7^{(9–11)}, [22–20]

== ATP Challenger and ITF Futures finals ==
=== Singles: 22 (14–8) ===
Legend ATP Challenger (9–5) ITF Futures (5–3)	Finals by surface Hard (2–0) Clay (12–8) Grass (0–0) Carpet (0–0)

Result	W–L	Date	Tournament	Tier	Surface	Opponent	Score
Loss	0–1	May 2000	Chile F5, Santiago	Futures	Clay	(Colombia) Mauricio Hadad	2–6, 2–6
Win	1–1	Jul 2002	France F14, Valescure	Futures	Hard	(France) Bertrand Contzler	6–4, 4–6, 6–0
Win	2–1	Apr 2004	France F6, Angers	Futures	Clay	(France) Marc Gicquel	2–6, 6–3, 6–4
Loss	2–2	Apr 2005	Monza, Italy	Challenger	Clay	(Italy) Alessio di Mauro	1–6, 6–2, 3–6
Loss	2–3	May 2005	Ostrava, Czech Republic	Challenger	Clay	(Czech Republic) Lukáš Dlouhý	4–6, 6–7^{(4–7)}
Win	3–3	Aug 2005	Pamplona, Spain	Challenger	Hard	(France) David Guez	6–2, 6–1
Win	4–3	Apr 2006	Monza, Italy	Challenger	Clay	(Italy) Flavio Cipolla	6–2, 7–5
Win	5–3	Apr 2006	Bergamo, Italy	Challenger	Clay	(Austria) Werner Eschauer	1–6, 7–5, 6–4
Win	6–3	Jun 2006	Košice, Slovakia	Challenger	Clay	(Spain) Gorka Fraile	6–0, 6–1
Win	7–3	Aug 2006	Timișoara, Romania	Challenger	Clay	(Spain) Pablo Santos González	7–6^{(7–5)}, 6–2
Loss	7–4	Sep 2006	Banja Luka, Bosnia & Herzegovina	Challenger	Clay	(Austria) Marco Mirnegg	2–6, 4–6
Win	8–4	Oct 2007	Belo Horizonte, Brazil	Challenger	Clay	(Spain) Marcel Granollers	6–2, 6–7^{(4–7)}, 7–6^{(8–6)}
Win	9–4	Jun 2008	Braunschweig, Germany	Challenger	Clay	(Argentina) Sergio Roitman	6–4, 6–4
Win	10–4	Jun 2008	Constanța, Romania	Challenger	Clay	(Romania) Adrian Ungur	6–3, 6–7^{(5–7)}, 7–6^{(12–10)}
Loss	10–5	Jul 2008	Lugano, Switzerland	Challenger	Clay	(Peru) Luis Horna	6–7^{(1–7)}, 1–6
Win	11–5	Jul 2008	Poznań, Poland	Challenger	Clay	(Germany) Björn Phau	7–5, 6–0
Win	12–5	Jul 2011	Belgium F2, Havré	Futures	Clay	(Belgium) Yannik Reuter	7–5, 6–3
Win	13–5	Jul 2011	Belgium F5, Heist	Futures	Clay	(Germany) Peter Torebko	6–3, 7–6^{(8–6)}
Loss	13–6	Aug 2011	Netherlands F5, Enschede	Futures	Clay	(Netherlands) Antal van der Duim	6–4, 4–6, 3–6
Loss	13–7	Oct 2011	Hungary F3, Budapest	Futures	Clay	(Hungary) Attila Balázs	6–7^{(4–7)}, 5–7
Win	14–7	Jan 2012	USA F2, Sunrise	Futures	Clay	(France) Olivier Patience	6–2, 6–3
Loss	14–8	Mar 2012	Casablanca, Morocco	Challenger	Clay	(Slovenia) Aljaž Bedene	6–7^{(6–8)}, 6–7^{(4–7)}

=== Doubles: 9 (4–5) ===
Legend ATP Challenger (2–0) ITF Futures (2–5)	Finals by surface Hard (2–2) Clay (2–3) Grass (0–0) Carpet (0–0)

Result	W–L	Date	Tournament	Tier	Surface	Partner	Opponents	Score
Loss	0–1	Jul 2001	France F11, Bourg-en-Bresse	Futures	Clay	(France) Christophe De Veaux	(France) Julien Benneteau (France) Nicolas Mahut	4–6, 6–7^{(4–7)}
Loss	0–2	Jul 2001	France F12, Zix-En-Provence	Futures	Clay	(France) Christophe De Veaux	(Monaco) Cyril Martin (Australia) Anthony Ross	6–7^{(5–7)}, 1–6
Loss	0–3	Jan 2002	France F1, Grasse	Futures	Clay	(France) Christophe De Veaux	(Argentina) Roberto Álvarez (France) Jordane Doble	4–6, 4–6
Win	1–3	Feb 2002	France F4, Deauville	Futures	Clay	(France) Christophe De Veaux	(Austria) Marko Neunteibl (Germany) Jan Weinzierl	7–5, 4–6, 6–1
Loss	1–4	Mar 2002	France F7, Poitiers	Futures	Hard	(France) Nicolas Tourte	(France) Benjamin Cassaigne (Belgium) Jeroen Masson	3–6, 6–7^{(3–7)}
Loss	1–5	Apr 2002	Jamaica F2, Montego Bay	Futures	Hard	(France) Thierry Guardiola	(United States) Tres Davis (Canada) Philip Gubenco	1–6, 6–4, 3–6
Win	2–5	Jul 2002	France F14, Valescure	Futures	Hard	(France) Jean-Christophe Faurel	(France) Julien Cuaz (France) Sonny Kayombo	6–4, 6–2
Win	3–5	Apr 2005	Monza, Italy	Challenger	Clay	(France) Olivier Patience	(Italy) Uros Vico (Italy) Massimo Bertolini	7–5, 6–4
Win	4–5	Jan 2010	Nouméa, New Caledonia	Challenger	Hard	(France) Édouard Roger-Vasselin	(Italy) Flavio Cipolla (Italy) Simone Vagnozzi	5–7, 6–2, [10–8]

== Performance timelines ==
Key
W	F	SF	QF	#R	RR	Q#	DNQ	A	NH

(W) winner; (F) finalist; (SF) semifinalist; (QF) quarterfinalist; (#R) rounds 4, 3, 2, 1; (RR) round-robin stage; (Q#) qualification round; (DNQ) did not qualify; (A) absent; (NH) not held; (SR) strike rate (events won / competed); (W–L) win–loss record.

=== Singles ===
Tournament	2004	2005	2006	2007	2008	2009	2010	2011	2012	2013	SR	W–L	Win %
Grand Slam tournaments
Australian Open	A	Q2	A	1R	Q2	1R	Q2	A	A	Q1	0 / 2	0–2	0%
French Open	Q1	Q3	Q1	1R	2R	1R	Q3	Q1	3R	A	0 / 4	3–4	43%
Wimbledon	Q2	Q1	Q1	2R	A	2R	A	A	A	A	0 / 2	2–2	50%
US Open	A	Q1	A	1R	2R	A	A	A	Q2	A	0 / 2	1–2	33%
Win–loss	0–0	0–0	0–0	1–4	2–2	1–3	0–0	0–0	2–1	0–0	0 / 10	6–10	25%
ATP Tour Masters 1000
Indian Wells Masters	A	A	A	Q1	A	1R	A	A	A	A	0 / 1	0–1	0%
Miami Open	A	A	A	A	A	1R	A	A	A	A	0 / 1	0–1	0%
Monte-Carlo Masters	2R	A	A	A	A	Q2	A	A	A	A	0 / 1	1–1	50%
Madrid Open	A	A	A	A	Q1	A	A	A	A	A	0 / 0	0–0	–
Paris Masters	A	A	A	A	Q1	A	A	A	A	A	0 / 0	0–0	–
Win–loss	1–1	0–0	0–0	0–0	0–0	0–2	0–0	0–0	0–0	0–0	0 / 3	1–3	25%
Year End Ranking	198	173	95	115	73	225	414	356	204	0	Earnings: $959,449		

=== Doubles ===
Tournament	2005	2006	2007	2008	2009	SR	W–L	Win %
Grand Slam tournaments
Australian Open	A	A	A	A	1R	0 / 1	0–1	0%
French Open	2R	1R	A	2R	1R	0 / 4	2–4	33%
Wimbledon	A	A	1R	A	1R	0 / 2	0–2	0%
US Open	A	A	A	1R	A	0 / 1	0–1	0%
Win–loss	1–1	0–1	0–1	1–2	0–3	0 / 8	2–8	20%
Year End Ranking	328	0	744	214	0			

== External links and references ==
- Nicolas Devilder at the Association of Tennis Professionals
- Nicolas Devilder at the International Tennis Federation
- Devilder world ranking history
