= Jonathan Dasnières de Veigy =

French tennis player (born 1987)

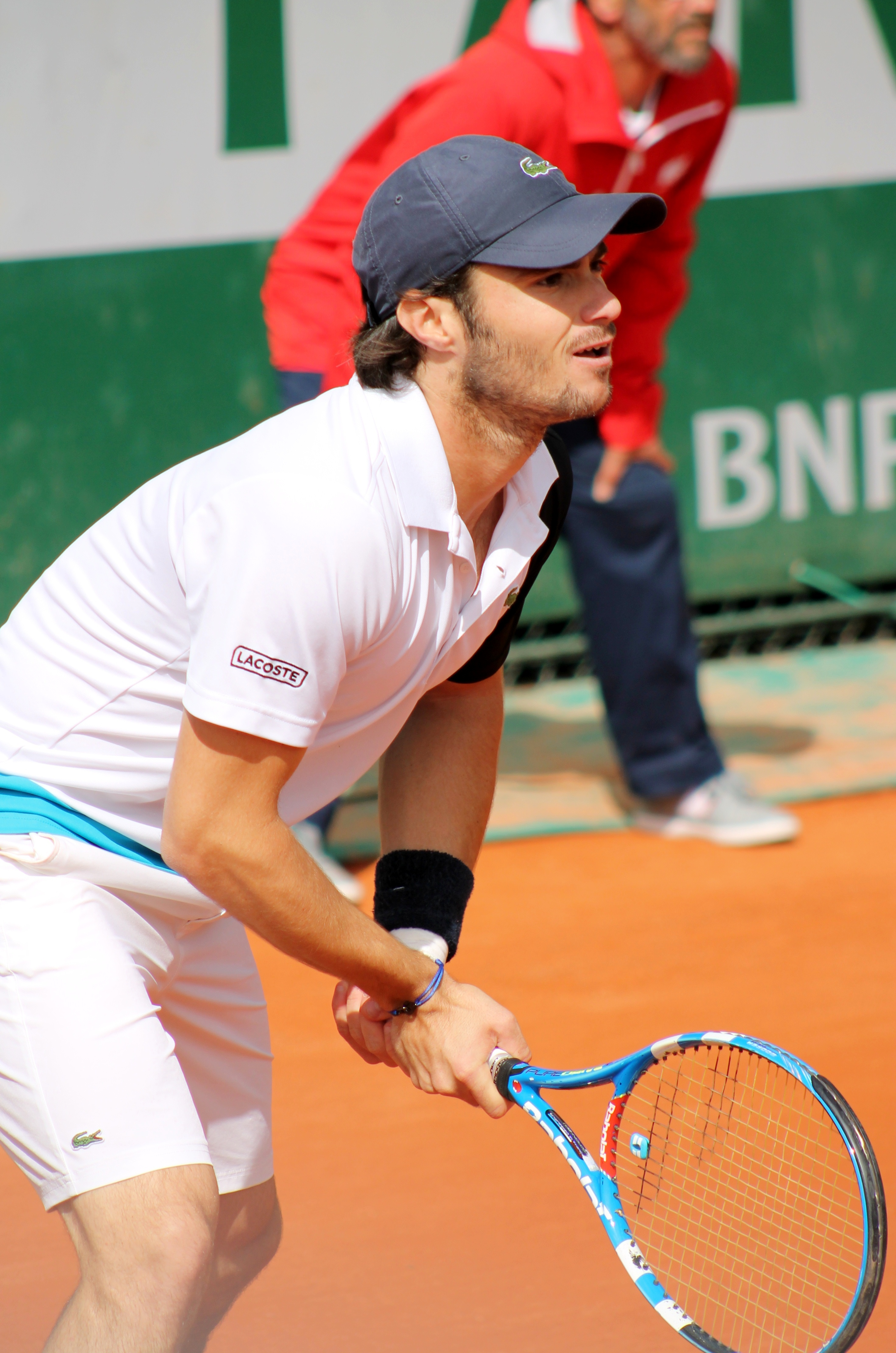
- Jonathan Dasnieres de Veigy playing at Roland Garros 2013
- Country (sports): France
- Residence: Nîmes, France
- Born: 5 January 1987 (age 39) Nîmes, France
- Height: 1.74 m (5 ft 9 in)
- Turned pro: 2004
- Retired: 2013
- Plays: Left-handed (two-handed backhand)
- Prize money: US$133,437

Singles
- Career record: 1–5
- Career titles: 0
- Highest ranking: No. 146 (25 February 2013)
- Current ranking: No. 609 (17 March 2014)

Grand Slam singles results
- Australian Open: Q2 (2012)
- French Open: 1R (2012)
- Wimbledon: Q3 (2012)
- US Open: 1R (2011)

Doubles
- Career record: 0–0
- Career titles: 0
- Highest ranking: No. 337 (12 August 2013)

Grand Slam doubles results
- French Open: 3R (2013)
- Last updated on: 26 August 2011.

Jonathan Dasnières de Veigy (born 8 January 1987 in Nîmes, France) is a former French professional tennis player. Dasnières de Veigy competes mainly on the ATP Challenger Tour, both in singles and doubles. He reached his highest ATP singles ranking, No. 146, on 25 February 2013, and his highest ATP doubles ranking, No. 337, on 12 August 2012.

== Futures and Challenger finals: 13 (8–5) ==
=== Singles: 10 (6–5) ===
Legend
Challengers (1–3)
Futures (5–2)

Outcome	No.	Date	Tournament	Surface	Opponent	Score
Winner	1.	25 May 2007	Krško, Slovenia	Clay (red)	(Slovenia) Rok Jarc	6–4, 6–3
Winner	2.	30 July 2007	Budapest, Hungary	Clay (red)	(Czech Republic) Jiří Školoudík	6–2, 6–1
Winner	3.	13 August 2007	Piešťany, Slovakia	Clay (red)	(Czech Republic) Filip Zeman	6–1, 6–2
Winner	4.	14 July 2008	Saint-Gervais, France	Hard	(France) Julien Jeanpierre	7–6^{(7–5)}, 5–7, 6–3
Runner-up	1.	13 October 2008	Casablanca, Morocco	Clay (red)	(Algeria) Lamine Ouahab	6–4, 6–3
Winner	5.	27 April 2009	Vero Beach, United States	Clay (red)	(The Bahamas) Timothy Neilly	6–7^{(6–8)}, 6–3, 6–1
Runner-up	2.	29 June 2009	Montauban, France	Clay (red)	(Austria) Andreas Haider-Maurer	6–2, 6–4
Runner-up	3.	27 July 2009	Saransk, Russia	Clay (red)	(Spain) Íñigo Cervantes-Huegún	7–5, 6–4
Runner-up	4.	10 August 2009	Samarkand, Uzbekistan	Clay (red)	(Jamaica) Dustin Brown	7–6^{(7–3)}, 6–3
Runner-up	5.	29 April 2012	Naples, Italy	Clay (red)	(Russia) Andrey Kuznetsov	7–6^{(8–6)}, 7–6^{(8–6)}
Winner	6.	6 May 2012	Ostrava, Czech Republic	Clay	(Czech Republic) Jan Hájek	7–5, 6–2

=== Doubles: 2 (2–0) ===
Legend
Challengers (1–0)
Futures (1–0)

Outcome	No.	Date	Tournament	Surface	Partner	Opponents	Score
Winner	1.	19 June 2006	Alkmaar, Netherlands	Clay (red)	(Belgium) Dominique Coene	(Netherlands) Romano Frantzen (Netherlands) Nick van der Meer	6–1, 2–6, 7–6^{(7–5)}
Winner	2.	31 July 2011	Tampere, Finland	Clay (red)	(France) David Guez	(France) Pierre-Hugues Herbert (France) Nicolas Renavand	5–7, 6–4, [10–5]
