= 2012 French Open – Men's singles qualifying =

Men's singles qualifying
- 2012 French Open

Events
Singles	men	women		boys	girls
Doubles	men	women	mixed	boys	girls
WC Singles	men	women	quad
WC Doubles	men	women	quad
Legends	−45	45+	women

Qualification
Singles	men	women
- French Open

This article displays the qualifying draw for men's singles at the 2012 French Open, a tennis tournament held .

== Seeds ==
1. (Australia) Marinko Matosevic (second round)
2. (Germany) Matthias Bachinger (qualifying competition)
3. (Estonia) Jürgen Zopp (qualified)
4. (Slovakia) Karol Beck (moved to Main Draw)
5. (Germany) Daniel Brands (qualifying competition)
6. (Chile) Paul Capdeville (first round)
7. (Portugal) Frederico Gil (first round)
8. (Argentina) Horacio Zeballos (qualified)
9. (Belgium) David Goffin (qualifying competition, lucky loser)
10. (United States) Michael Russell (second round)
11. (Germany) Tommy Haas (qualified)
12. (Germany) Michael Berrer (qualified)
13. (Spain) Roberto Bautista Agut (first round)
14. (Argentina) Federico Delbonis (second round)
15. (Croatia) Antonio Veić (first round)
16. (Brazil) Rogério Dutra Silva (qualified)
17. (Netherlands) Igor Sijsling (qualified)
18. (Turkey) Marsel İlhan (second round)
19. (Czech Republic) Jan Hájek (qualifying competition)
20. (Slovenia) Grega Žemlja (first round)
21. (Spain) Daniel Muñoz de la Nava (qualified)
22. (United States) Jesse Levine (qualified)
23. (Belgium) Ruben Bemelmans (second round)
24. (United States) Bobby Reynolds (second round)
25. (United States) Wayne Odesnik (first round)
26. (Switzerland) Marco Chiudinelli (first round)
27. (Portugal) João Sousa (qualified)
28. (Slovenia) Aljaž Bedene (second round)
29. (United Kingdom) James Ward (first round)
30. (France) Augustin Gensse (first round)
31. (South Africa) Rik de Voest (first round)
32. (Russia) Teymuraz Gabashvili (first round)

== Qualifiers ==
1. (United States) Jesse Levine
2. (Argentina) Eduardo Schwank
3. (Estonia) Jürgen Zopp
4. (Austria) Andreas Haider-Maurer
5. (Serbia) Filip Krajinović
6. (Russia) Andrey Kuznetsov
7. (Netherlands) Igor Sijsling
8. (Argentina) Horacio Zeballos
9. (Portugal) João Sousa
10. (France) Florent Serra
11. (Germany) Tommy Haas
12. (Germany) Michael Berrer
13. (Germany) Mischa Zverev
14. (Spain) Daniel Muñoz de la Nava
15. (France) Nicolas Devilder
16. (Brazil) Rogério Dutra Silva

== Lucky loser ==
1. (Belgium) David Goffin

== Qualifying draw ==
Key

- Q = Qualifier
- WC = Wild card
- LL = Lucky loser
- Alt = Alternate
- ITF = ITF entry
- PR = Protected ranking
- SR = Special ranking
- SE = Special exempt
- JE = Junior exempt
- JR = Junior Accelerator Programme entrant
- CO = College Accelerator Programme entrant
- NG = Next Gen Accelerator Program entrant
- w/o = Walkover
- r = Retired
- d = Defaulted

=== First qualifier ===
First round
1	(Australia) Marinko Matosevic	6	6
(France) Mathieu Rodrigues	1	1
(Colombia) Carlos Salamanca	6^{7}	2
(France) Marc Gicquel	7^{9}	6
(South Africa) Izak van der Merwe	6^{4}	3
(Brazil) Thiago Alves	7^{7}	6
WC	(France) Julien Obry	2	2
22	(United States) Jesse Levine	6	6

Second round
1	(Australia) Marinko Matosevic	4	3
(France) Marc Gicquel	6	6
(Brazil) Thiago Alves	6	4	2
22	(United States) Jesse Levine	4	6	6

Qualifying competition
(France) Marc Gicquel	2	4
22	(United States) Jesse Levine	6	6

=== Second qualifier ===
First round
2	(Germany) Matthias Bachinger	7	7
(Spain) Adrián Menéndez	5	5
(Canada) Érik Chvojka	3	1
(Czech Republic) Jan Mertl	6	6
(Argentina) Facundo Bagnis	6	4	3
(Argentina) Eduardo Schwank	4	6	6
(United States) Denis Kudla	6	4	6
29	(United Kingdom) James Ward	2	6	3

Second round
2	(Germany) Matthias Bachinger	6	6
(Czech Republic) Jan Mertl	3	3
(Argentina) Eduardo Schwank	6	6
(United States) Denis Kudla	3	3

Qualifying competition
2	(Germany) Matthias Bachinger	6^{2}	2
(Argentina) Eduardo Schwank	7^{7}	6

=== Third qualifier ===
First round
3	(Estonia) Jürgen Zopp	6	6
(Austria) Philipp Oswald	1	1
(Austria) Martin Fischer	3	6	8
(United States) Robby Ginepri	6	3	6
(Italy) Gianluca Naso	6	7^{7}
(Japan) Yūichi Sugita	2	6^{4}
(France) Josselin Ouanna	6	6
32	(Russia) Teymuraz Gabashvili	4	3

Second round
3	(Estonia) Jürgen Zopp	6	6
(Austria) Martin Fischer	1	3
(Italy) Gianluca Naso	3	4
(France) Josselin Ouanna	6	6

Qualifying competition
3	(Estonia) Jürgen Zopp	7^{7}	6
(France) Josselin Ouanna	6^{4}	4

=== Fourth qualifier ===
First round
Alt	(Portugal) Pedro Sousa	3	6	6
(Chinese Taipei) Jimmy Wang	6	4	1
(China) Zhang Ze	5	6	6
(Serbia) Nikola Ćirić	7	4	4
(Argentina) Agustín Velotti	3	6^{6}
(Austria) Andreas Haider-Maurer	6	7^{8}
(France) Maxime Teixeira	6	7
26	(Switzerland) Marco Chiudinelli	2	5

Second round
Alt	(Portugal) Pedro Sousa	6	4	6
(China) Zhang Ze	2	6	2
(Austria) Andreas Haider-Maurer	6	7
(France) Maxime Teixeira	4	5

Qualifying competition
Alt	(Portugal) Pedro Sousa	4	3
(Austria) Andreas Haider-Maurer	6	6

=== Fifth qualifier ===
First round
5	(Germany) Daniel Brands	6	7^{7}
(Australia) James Duckworth	4	6^{1}
(Italy) Matteo Viola	5	7^{7}	3
PR	(Croatia) Franko Škugor	7	6^{1}	6
PR	(Serbia) Filip Krajinović	6^{2}	6	6
(Czech Republic) Dušan Lojda	7^{7}	3	3
(Kazakhstan) Yuri Schukin	0	7^{7}	2
24	(United States) Bobby Reynolds	6	6^{1}	6

Second round
5	(Germany) Daniel Brands	6	6
PR	(Croatia) Franko Škugor	4	4
PR	(Serbia) Filip Krajinović	6	3	6
24	(United States) Bobby Reynolds	2	6	4

Qualifying competition
5	(Germany) Daniel Brands	2	3
PR	(Serbia) Filip Krajinović	6	6

=== Sixth qualifier ===
First round
6	(Chile) Paul Capdeville	3	0
(Belgium) Yannick Mertens	6	6
(Israel) Amir Weintraub	2	1
(Russia) Andrey Kuznetsov	6	6
WC	(France) Pierre-Hugues Herbert	3	5
WC	(France) Axel Michon	6	7
(Chinese Taipei) Yang Tsung-hua	5	6^{1}
28	(Slovenia) Aljaž Bedene	7	7^{7}

Second round
(Belgium) Yannick Mertens	3	1
(Russia) Andrey Kuznetsov	6	6
WC	(France) Axel Michon	6	7^{7}
28	(Slovenia) Aljaž Bedene	3	6^{1}

Qualifying competition
(Russia) Andrey Kuznetsov	6	6
WC	(France) Axel Michon	1	3

=== Seventh qualifier ===
First round
7	(Portugal) Frederico Gil	5	6	2
(Poland) Jerzy Janowicz	7	4	6
(Spain) Iñigo Cervantes Huegun	7^{7}	6
(Germany) Stefan Seifert	6^{4}	2
(Japan) Hiroki Moriya	6^{5}	7	7
(United Kingdom) Joshua Goodall	7^{7}	5	5
(Argentina) Diego Junqueira	6	0	6
17	(Netherlands) Igor Sijsling	4	6	8

Second round
(Poland) Jerzy Janowicz	7^{7}	6
(Spain) Iñigo Cervantes Huegun	6^{3}	2
(Japan) Hiroki Moriya	3	3
17	(Netherlands) Igor Sijsling	6	6

Qualifying competition
(Poland) Jerzy Janowicz	4	6	4
17	(Netherlands) Igor Sijsling	6	3	6

=== Eighth qualifier ===
First round
8	(Argentina) Horacio Zeballos	6	3	6
(France) Stéphane Robert	3	6	4
(Canada) Peter Polansky	7^{7}	6^{3}	6
(Netherlands) Thomas Schoorel	6^{4}	7^{7}	2
(Belgium) Maxime Authom	6	6
(Finland) Harri Heliövaara	1	1
(Germany) Peter Gojowczyk	1	6	6
25	(United States) Wayne Odesnik	6	4	1

Second round
8	(Argentina) Horacio Zeballos	3	7^{7}	6
(Canada) Peter Polansky	6	6^{3}	0
(Belgium) Maxime Authom	4	0
(Germany) Peter Gojowczyk	6	6

Qualifying competition
8	(Argentina) Horacio Zeballos	0	6	6
(Germany) Peter Gojowczyk	6	2	1

=== Ninth qualifier ===
First round
9	(Belgium) David Goffin	6	6
(France) Grégoire Burquier	2	2
(Netherlands) Jesse Huta Galung	5	4
(Italy) Simone Vagnozzi	7	6
(Czech Republic) Ivo Minář	6^{4}	6	14
(Kazakhstan) Andrey Golubev	7^{7}	4	12
(Serbia) Dušan Lajović	3	6^{8}
27	(Portugal) João Sousa	6	7^{10}

Second round
9	(Belgium) David Goffin	6	6
(Italy) Simone Vagnozzi	1	4
(Czech Republic) Ivo Minář	0	3
27	(Portugal) João Sousa	6	6

Qualifying competition
9	(Belgium) David Goffin	3	6^{3}
27	(Portugal) João Sousa	6	7^{7}

=== Tenth qualifier ===
First round
10	(United States) Michael Russell	4	6	7
(Germany) Simon Greul	6	3	5
(Argentina) Martín Alund	6	6
(Thailand) Danai Udomchoke	1	0
(United States) Alex Kuznetsov	7^{7}	7
(United States) Michael Yani	6^{3}	5
(France) Florent Serra	6	6
31	(South Africa) Rik de Voest	1	1

Second round
10	(United States) Michael Russell	2	3
(Argentina) Martín Alund	6	6
(United States) Alex Kuznetsov	6^{5}	5
(France) Florent Serra	7^{7}	7

Qualifying competition
(Argentina) Martín Alund	4	7^{10}	2
(France) Florent Serra	6	6^{8}	6

=== Eleventh qualifier ===
First round
11	(Germany) Tommy Haas	6	6
(Argentina) Guido Pella	3	3
(Colombia) Robert Farah Maksoud	6	3	6
(Argentina) Marco Trungelliti	4	6	4
(Spain) Iván Navarro	0	6	10
(Germany) Denis Gremelmayr	6	1	8
(Bosnia and Herzegovina) Amer Delić	6^{5}	2
23	(Belgium) Ruben Bemelmans	7^{7}	6

Second round
11	(Germany) Tommy Haas	6	6
(Colombia) Robert Farah Maksoud	4	3
(Spain) Iván Navarro	3	6	6
23	(Belgium) Ruben Bemelmans	6	3	4

Qualifying competition
11	(Germany) Tommy Haas	6	6
(Spain) Iván Navarro	4	1

=== Twelfth qualifier ===
First round
12	(Germany) Michael Berrer	7	6
WC	(France) Fabrice Martin	5	3
(Australia) Benjamin Mitchell	6	4	3
WC	(France) Albano Olivetti	4	6	6
(France) Romain Jouan	6	4	6
(Russia) Evgeny Donskoy	4	6	3
(Slovakia) Pavol Červenák	6	6
20	(Slovenia) Grega Žemlja	4	4

Second round
12	(Germany) Michael Berrer	7^{7}	7^{7}
WC	(France) Albano Olivetti	6^{3}	6^{1}
(France) Romain Jouan	6	3	8
(Slovakia) Pavol Červenák	3	6	6

Qualifying competition
12	(Germany) Michael Berrer	6	6
(France) Romain Jouan	3	2

=== Thirteenth qualifier ===
First round
13	(Spain) Roberto Bautista Agut	7^{7}	4	5
(Germany) Mischa Zverev	6^{5}	6	7
(Spain) Guillermo Olaso	6	5	6
(Slovakia) Kamil Čapkovič	4	7	2
WC	(France) Vincent Millot	6	7^{7}
(Ukraine) Sergei Bubka	4	6^{1}
(Spain) Arnau Brugués Davi	2	6	3
19	(Czech Republic) Jan Hájek	6	3	6

Second round
(Germany) Mischa Zverev	6	6
(Spain) Guillermo Olaso	0	0
WC	(France) Vincent Millot	4	6	4
19	(Czech Republic) Jan Hájek	6	2	6

Qualifying competition
(Germany) Mischa Zverev	6	6
19	(Czech Republic) Jan Hájek	2	4

=== Fourteenth qualifier ===
First round
14	(Argentina) Federico Delbonis	7^{7}	4	10
(United States) Tim Smyczek	6^{3}	6	8
(Argentina) Máximo González	6	3	4
(Lithuania) Laurynas Grigelis	1	6	6
(Germany) Peter Torebko	4	6^{3}
(United Kingdom) Jamie Baker	6	7^{7}
(Brazil) Júlio Silva	4	4
21	(Spain) Daniel Muñoz de la Nava	6	6

Second round
14	(Argentina) Federico Delbonis	4	6^{4}
(Lithuania) Laurynas Grigelis	6	7^{7}
(United Kingdom) Jamie Baker	4	3
21	(Spain) Daniel Muñoz de la Nava	6	6

Qualifying competition
(Lithuania) Laurynas Grigelis	1	1
21	(Spain) Daniel Muñoz de la Nava	6	6

=== Fifteenth qualifier ===
First round
15	(Croatia) Antonio Veić	3	6	4
(France) Kenny de Schepper	6	1	6
(Australia) Greg Jones	6	6
(Czech Republic) Jan Hernych	4	1
(Portugal) Gastão Elias	4	6^{5}
WC	(France) Nicolas Devilder	6	7^{7}
(Russia) Konstantin Kravchuk	4	4
18	(Turkey) Marsel İlhan	6	6

Second round
(France) Kenny de Schepper	4	6	3
(Australia) Greg Jones	6	3	6
WC	(France) Nicolas Devilder	7^{7}	7
18	(Turkey) Marsel İlhan	6^{2}	5

Qualifying competition
(Australia) Greg Jones	5	1
WC	(France) Nicolas Devilder	7	6

=== Sixteenth qualifier ===
First round
16	(Brazil) Rogério Dutra Silva	6	6
(Germany) Dustin Brown	2	1
WC	(France) Laurent Rochette	6	6
(Dominican Republic) Víctor Estrella	3	1
(Spain) Javier Martí	6	6
WC	(France) David Guez	4	3
(Italy) Stefano Galvani	6^{7}	6	6
30	(France) Augustin Gensse	7^{9}	3	2

Second round
16	(Brazil) Rogério Dutra Silva	7^{8}	4	6
WC	(France) Laurent Rochette	6^{6}	6	4
(Spain) Javier Martí	6	6
(Italy) Stefano Galvani	1	1

Qualifying competition
16	(Brazil) Rogério Dutra Silva	6	6
(Spain) Javier Martí	1	2
