= 2012 French Open – Women's singles qualifying =

Women's singles qualifying
- 2012 French Open

Events
Singles	men	women		boys	girls
Doubles	men	women	mixed	boys	girls
WC Singles	men	women	quad
WC Doubles	men	women	quad
Legends	−45	45+	women

Qualification
Singles	men	women
- French Open

== Seeds ==
1. (Netherlands) Kiki Bertens (qualified)
2. (Czech Republic) Andrea Hlaváčková (second round)
3. (Italy) Karin Knapp (first round)
4. (Uzbekistan) Akgul Amanmuradova (second round)
5. (United Kingdom) Heather Watson (qualified)
6. (Czech Republic) Eva Birnerová (qualified)
7. (Japan) Misaki Doi (second round)
8. (Colombia) Mariana Duque Mariño (first round)
9. (Switzerland) Stefanie Vögele (second round)
10. (Spain) Garbiñe Muguruza (qualifying competition)
11. (Czech Republic) Karolína Plíšková (qualified)
12. (Australia) Olivia Rogowska (first round)
13. (Russia) Yulia Putintseva (second round)
14. (Kazakhstan) Sesil Karatantcheva (qualifying competition, lucky loser)
15. (United Kingdom) Laura Robson (qualifying competition, lucky loser)
16. (Russia) Valeria Savinykh (first round)
17. (Argentina) Gisela Dulko (first round)
18. (Russia) Alla Kudryavtseva (first round)
19. (Japan) Kurumi Nara (first round)
20. (Japan) Erika Sema (second round)
21. (Spain) Lara Arruabarrena (qualified)
22. (United States) Jill Craybas (second round)
23. (United States) Alison Riske (first round)
24. (France) Iryna Brémond (second round)

== Qualifiers ==
1. (Netherlands) Kiki Bertens
2. (Chinese Taipei) Chan Yung-jan
3. (Kazakhstan) Yaroslava Shvedova
4. (United States) Alexa Glatch
5. (United Kingdom) Heather Watson
6. (Czech Republic) Eva Birnerová
7. (Germany) Dinah Pfizenmaier
8. (Canada) Heidi El Tabakh
9. (United States) Lauren Davis
10. (Spain) Lara Arruabarrena
11. (Czech Republic) Karolína Plíšková
12. (China) Zhang Shuai

=== Lucky losers ===
1. (United Kingdom) Laura Robson
2. (Kazakhstan) Sesil Karatantcheva

== Qualifying draw ==
Key

- Q = Qualifier
- WC = Wild card
- LL = Lucky loser
- Alt = Alternate
- ITF = ITF entry
- PR = Protected ranking
- SR = Special ranking
- SE = Special exempt
- JE = Junior exempt
- JR = Junior Accelerator Programme entrant
- CO = College Accelerator Programme entrant
- NG = Next Gen Accelerator Program entrant
- w/o = Walkover
- r = Retired
- d = Defaulted

=== First qualifier ===
First round
1	(Netherlands) Kiki Bertens	6	4	9
(Germany) Annika Beck	1	6	7
(Ukraine) Olga Savchuk	2	6^{2}
(Russia) Olga Puchkova	6	7^{7}
(Bulgaria) Elitsa Kostova	6	1	1
(Romania) Mădălina Gojnea	1	6	6
(United States) Gail Brodsky	1	4
22	(United States) Jill Craybas	6	6

Second round
1	(Netherlands) Kiki Bertens	6	6
(Russia) Olga Puchkova	2	0
(Romania) Mădălina Gojnea	7^{7}	6
22	(United States) Jill Craybas	6^{5}	4

Qualifying competition
1	(Netherlands) Kiki Bertens	6	6
(Romania) Mădălina Gojnea	2	1

=== Second qualifier ===
First round
2	(Czech Republic) Andrea Hlaváčková	6	7
(Poland) Marta Domachowska	0	5
(Chinese Taipei) Chan Yung-jan	7^{7}	6
(Switzerland) Amra Sadiković	6^{4}	4
PR	(Belarus) Darya Kustova	6	3	4
(Paraguay) Verónica Cepede Royg	4	6	6
(Italy) Maria Elena Camerin	7	6
23	(United States) Alison Riske	5	4

Second round
2	(Czech Republic) Andrea Hlaváčková	2	3
(Chinese Taipei) Chan Yung-jan	6	6
(Paraguay) Verónica Cepede Royg	7^{7}	6
(Italy) Maria Elena Camerin	6^{2}	2

Qualifying competition
(Chinese Taipei) Chan Yung-jan	6	6
(Paraguay) Verónica Cepede Royg	1	2

=== Third qualifier ===
First round
3	(Italy) Karin Knapp	6	2	4
(United States) Coco Vandeweghe	4	6	6
(Croatia) Ajla Tomljanović	4	4
(Kazakhstan) Yaroslava Shvedova	6	6
(United States) Madison Brengle	7	2	6
Alt	(Japan) Misa Eguchi	5	6	1
(Romania) Elena Bogdan	6	6
18	(Russia) Alla Kudryavtseva	2	2

Second round
(United States) Coco Vandeweghe	1	2
(Kazakhstan) Yaroslava Shvedova	6	6
(United States) Madison Brengle	6	4	2
(Romania) Elena Bogdan	4	6	6

Qualifying competition
(Kazakhstan) Yaroslava Shvedova	6	6
(Romania) Elena Bogdan	1	1

=== Fourth qualifier ===
First round
4	(Uzbekistan) Akgul Amanmuradova	6^{5}	7	7
(Netherlands) Bibiane Schoofs	7^{7}	5	5
(United States) Alexa Glatch	6	6^{5}	6
(Czech Republic) Renata Voráčová	3	7^{7}	0
(Italy) Nastassja Burnett	7	6
(United States) Chiara Scholl	5	0
(United Kingdom) Naomi Broady	0	1
14	(Kazakhstan) Sesil Karatantcheva	6	6

Second round
4	(Uzbekistan) Akgul Amanmuradova	6	4	1
(United States) Alexa Glatch	4	6	6
(Italy) Nastassja Burnett	6	1	1
14	(Kazakhstan) Sesil Karatantcheva	2	6	6

Qualifying competition
(United States) Alexa Glatch	6	6
14	(Kazakhstan) Sesil Karatantcheva	2	4

=== Fifth qualifier ===
First round
5	(United Kingdom) Heather Watson	6	6
(Canada) Sharon Fichman	1	2
(Serbia) Aleksandra Krunić	6	4	2
WC	(Tunisia) Ons Jabeur	3	6	6
(Spain) Leticia Costas	7	6
(Germany) Kristina Barrois	5	4
(Italy) Anna Floris	6	0	6
19	(Japan) Kurumi Nara	4	6	4

Second round
5	(United Kingdom) Heather Watson	7^{7}	6
WC	(Tunisia) Ons Jabeur	6^{5}	3
(Spain) Leticia Costas	2	0
(Italy) Anna Floris	6	6

Qualifying competition
5	(United Kingdom) Heather Watson	6	6
(Italy) Anna Floris	0	1

=== Sixth qualifier ===
First round
6	(Czech Republic) Eva Birnerová	6	6
(Russia) Ekaterina Ivanova	3	1
(Japan) Yurika Sema	2	6	6
(Georgia (country)) Margalita Chakhnashvili	6	2	1
(Poland) Sandra Zaniewska	6	6
(Australia) Sacha Jones	4	2
(Serbia) Vesna Dolonc	1	7	6
17	(Argentina) Gisela Dulko	6	5	3

Second round
6	(Czech Republic) Eva Birnerová	6	6
(Japan) Yurika Sema	2	1
(Poland) Sandra Zaniewska	7^{7}	3	6
(Serbia) Vesna Dolonc	6^{1}	6	3

Qualifying competition
6	(Czech Republic) Eva Birnerová	6	3	6
(Poland) Sandra Zaniewska	4	6	4

=== Seventh qualifier ===
First round
7	(Japan) Misaki Doi	6	3	8
PR	(Georgia (country)) Oksana Kalashnikova	3	6	6
(Czech Republic) Kristýna Plíšková	6	2	1
(Germany) Dinah Pfizenmaier	2	6	6
(Japan) Rika Fujiwara	4	2
(Puerto Rico) Monica Puig	6	6
(Australia) Isabella Holland	6^{3}	2
24	(France) Iryna Brémond	7^{7}	6

Second round
7	(Japan) Misaki Doi	4	6	2
(Germany) Dinah Pfizenmaier	6	3	6
(Puerto Rico) Monica Puig	6	6
24	(France) Iryna Brémond	1	0

Qualifying competition
(Germany) Dinah Pfizenmaier	5	7	6
(Puerto Rico) Monica Puig	7	5	2

=== Eighth qualifier ===
First round
8	(Colombia) Mariana Duque Mariño	3	4
(Italy) Camila Giorgi	6	6
(Spain) Arantxa Parra Santonja	4	6	6
WC	(France) Julie Coin	6	2	2
(Canada) Heidi El Tabakh	6	3	6
WC	(France) Amandine Hesse	4	6	2
(Slovakia) Jana Čepelová	2	4
20	(Japan) Erika Sema	6	6

Second round
(Italy) Camila Giorgi	7	6
(Spain) Arantxa Parra Santonja	5	1
(Canada) Heidi El Tabakh	6	6
20	(Japan) Erika Sema	1	1

Qualifying competition
(Italy) Camila Giorgi	7^{7}	4	2
(Canada) Heidi El Tabakh	6^{5}	6	6

=== Ninth qualifier ===
First round
9	(Switzerland) Stefanie Vögele	6	6
(Thailand) Noppawan Lertcheewakarn	0	4
(United States) Julia Cohen	6	6
(Slovenia) Petra Rampre	1	2
WC	(France) Myrtille Georges	6	2	1
(Austria) Yvonne Meusburger	2	6	6
(United States) Lauren Davis	7^{10}	6
16	(Russia) Valeria Savinykh	6^{8}	1

Second round
9	(Switzerland) Stefanie Vögele	3	3
(United States) Julia Cohen	6	6
(Austria) Yvonne Meusburger	2	2
(United States) Lauren Davis	6	6

Qualifying competition
(United States) Julia Cohen	6	4	2
(United States) Lauren Davis	1	6	6

=== Tenth qualifier ===
First round
10	(Spain) Garbiñe Muguruza	6	6
(Russia) Ekaterina Bychkova	2	2
(Ukraine) Elina Svitolina	6	6
(Hungary) Réka-Luca Jani	2	4
(Ukraine) Yuliya Beygelzimer	6	6
WC	(France) Nathalie Piquion	2	2
(Germany) Sarah Gronert	3	2
21	(Spain) Lara Arruabarrena	6	6

Second round
10	(Spain) Garbiñe Muguruza	6	7
(Ukraine) Elina Svitolina	1	5
(Ukraine) Yuliya Beygelzimer	3	2
21	(Spain) Lara Arruabarrena	6	6

Qualifying competition
10	(Spain) Garbiñe Muguruza	0	6^{7}
21	(Spain) Lara Arruabarrena	6	7^{9}

=== Eleventh qualifier ===
First round
11	(Czech Republic) Karolína Plíšková	6	7^{7}
(Bulgaria) Dia Evtimova	3	6^{4}
(Belgium) Tamaryn Hendler	3	7	6
WC	(France) Alizé Lim	6	5	4
(Argentina) Florencia Molinero	5	2
WC	(France) Laura Thorpe	7	6
(Spain) Estrella Cabeza Candela	2	6^{4}
15	(United Kingdom) Laura Robson	6	7^{7}

Second round
11	(Czech Republic) Karolína Plíšková	7	6
(Belgium) Tamaryn Hendler	5	3
WC	(France) Laura Thorpe	5	6^{5}
15	(United Kingdom) Laura Robson	7	7^{7}

Qualifying competition
11	(Czech Republic) Karolína Plíšková	4	7	6
15	(United Kingdom) Laura Robson	6	5	4

=== Twelfth qualifier ===
First round
12	(Australia) Olivia Rogowska	5	3
(China) Zhang Shuai	7	6
(Romania) Mihaela Buzărnescu	6	3	6
WC	(France) Lou Brouleau	0	6	4
(Germany) Tatjana Malek	4	6	6
(Portugal) Michelle Larcher De Brito	6	2	1
(Russia) Anastasia Pivovarova	2	3
13	(Russia) Yulia Putintseva	6	6

Second round
(China) Zhang Shuai	7	6
(Romania) Mihaela Buzărnescu	5	2
(Germany) Tatjana Malek	6	1	6
13	(Russia) Yulia Putintseva	1	6	4

Qualifying competition
(China) Zhang Shuai	7^{8}	4	6
(Germany) Tatjana Malek	6^{6}	6	4
