= 2012 French Open – Day-by-day summaries =

This list is a form of detail the day-by-day summaries:

== Day 1 (27 May) ==
- Schedule of Play
- Seeds out:
  - Men's Singles: (United States) Andy Roddick [26], (Austria) Jürgen Melzer [30]

Matches on main courts
Matches on Court Philippe Chatrier (Center Court)
Event	Winner	Loser	Score
Women's Singles 1st round	(Australia) Samantha Stosur [6]	(United Kingdom) Elena Baltacha	6–4, 6–0
Men's Singles 1st round	(Argentina) Juan Martín del Potro [9]	(Spain) Albert Montañés	6–2, 6–7^{(5–7)}, 6–2, 6–1
Men's Singles 1st round	(France) Jo-Wilfried Tsonga [5]	(Russia) Andrey Kuznetsov	1–6, 6–3, 6–2, 6–4
Women's Singles 1st round	(United States) Venus Williams	(Argentina) Paula Ormaechea	4–6, 6–1, 6–3
Matches on Court Suzanne Lenglen (Grandstand)
Event	Winner	Loser	Score
Women's Singles 1st round	(Russia) Svetlana Kuznetsova [26]	(Croatia) Mirjana Lučić	6–1, 6–3
Men's Singles 1st round	(Spain) Juan Carlos Ferrero	(France) Jonathan Dasnières de Veigy [WC]	6–1, 6–4, 6–3
Women's Singles 1st round	(Serbia) Ana Ivanovic [13]	(Spain) Lara Arruabarrena Vecino [Q]	6–1, 6–1
Men's Singles 1st round	(France) Nicolas Mahut	(United States) Andy Roddick [26]	6–3, 6–3, 4–6, 6–2

== Day 2 (28 May) ==
- Schedule of Play
- Seeds out:
  - Men's Singles: (Spain) Feliciano López [15], (Czech Republic) Radek Štěpánek [23]
  - Women's Singles: (Russia) Vera Zvonareva [11] (withdrew), (Germany) Sabine Lisicki [12], (Italy) Roberta Vinci [17], (Germany) Mona Barthel [30], (Romania) Monica Niculescu [32]

Matches on main courts
Matches on Court Philippe Chatrier (Center Court)
Event	Winner	Loser	Score
Women's Singles 1st round	(Belarus) Victoria Azarenka [1]	(Italy) Alberta Brianti	6–7^{(6–8)}, 6–4, 6–2
Women's Singles 1st round	(China) Li Na [7]	(Romania) Sorana Cîrstea	6–2, 6–1
Men's Singles 1st round	(Serbia) Novak Djokovic [1]	(Italy) Potito Starace	7–6^{(7–3)}, 6–3, 6–1
Men's Singles 1st round	(France) Gilles Simon [11]	(United States) Ryan Harrison	3–6, 7–5, 6–4, 6–1
Matches on Court Suzanne Lenglen (Grandstand)
Event	Winner	Loser	Score
Women's Singles 1st round	(Slovakia) Dominika Cibulková [15]	(France) Kristina Mladenovic [WC]	6–2, 6–1
Men's Singles 1st round	(Switzerland) Roger Federer [3]	(Germany) Tobias Kamke	6–2, 7–5, 6–3
Men's Singles 1st round	(France) Michaël Llodra	(Spain) Guillermo García-López	7–6^{(7–5)}, 6–2, 3–6, 6–3
Women's Singles 1st round	(France) Marion Bartoli [8]	(Czech Republic) Karolína Plíšková [Q]	6–3, 6–3

== Day 3 (29 May) ==
- Schedule of Play
- Seeds out:
  - Men's Singles: (Ukraine) Alexandr Dolgopolov [16]
  - Women's Singles: (United States) Serena Williams [5]
  - Women's Doubles: (Czech Republic) Iveta Benešová / (Czech Republic) Barbora Záhlavová-Strýcová [8], (United States) Bethanie Mattek-Sands / (India) Sania Mirza [15]

Matches on main courts
Matches on Court Philippe Chatrier (Center Court)
Event	Winner	Loser	Score
Women's Singles 1st round	(Italy) Francesca Schiavone [14]	(Japan) Kimiko Date-Krumm	6–3, 6–1
Men's Singles 1st round	(France) Richard Gasquet [17]	(Estonia) Jürgen Zopp [Q]	6–3, 6–4, 7–6^{(7–4)}
Men's Singles 1st round	(Spain) Rafael Nadal [2]	(Italy) Simone Bolelli	6–2, 6–2, 6–1
Women's Singles 1st round	(France) Virginie Razzano	(United States) Serena Williams [5]	4–6, 7–6^{(7–5)}, 6–3
Matches on Court Suzanne Lenglen (Grandstand)
Event	Winner	Loser	Score
Women's Singles 1st round	(Czech Republic) Petra Kvitová [4]	(Australia) Ashleigh Barty [WC]	6–1, 6–2
Women's Singles 1st round	(Russia) Maria Sharapova [2]	(Romania) Alexandra Cadanțu	6–0, 6–0
Men's Singles 1st round	(France) Julien Benneteau [29]	(Germany) Mischa Zverev [Q]	6–2, 6–7^{(3–7)}, 6–4, 6–4
Men's Singles 1st round	(United Kingdom) Andy Murray [4]	(Japan) Tatsuma Ito	6–1, 7–5, 6–0

== Day 4 (30 May) ==
- Schedule of Play
- Seeds out:
  - Women's Singles: (France) Marion Bartoli [8], (Czech Republic) Lucie Šafářová [20], (Czech Republic) Petra Cetkovská [24], (China) Zheng Jie [31]
  - Women's Doubles: (United States) Liezel Huber / (United States) Lisa Raymond [1]
  - Mixed Doubles: (United States) Lisa Raymond / (India) Rohan Bopanna [4], (Czech Republic) Andrea Hlaváčková / (Pakistan) Aisam-ul-Haq Qureshi [8]

Matches on main courts
Matches on Court Philippe Chatrier (Center Court)
Event	Winner	Loser	Score
Women's Singles 2nd round	(Belarus) Victoria Azarenka [1]	(Germany) Dinah Pfizenmaier [Q]	6–1, 6–1
Men's Singles 2nd round	(Switzerland) Roger Federer [3]	(Romania) Adrian Ungur	6–3, 6–2, 6–7^{(6–8)}, 6–3
Men's Singles 2nd round	(France) Gilles Simon [11]	(United States) Brian Baker [WC]	6–4, 6–1, 6–7^{(4–7)}, 1–6, 6–0
Women's Singles 2nd round	(Poland) Agnieszka Radwańska [3]	(United States) Venus Williams	6–2, 6–3
Matches on Court Suzanne Lenglen (Grandstand)
Event	Winner	Loser	Score
Men's Singles 2nd round	(Serbia) Novak Djokovic [1]	(Slovenia) Blaž Kavčič	6–0, 6–4, 6–4
Women's Singles 2nd round	(France) Mathilde Johansson	(Czech Republic) Petra Cetkovská [24]	7–6^{(7–1)}, 6–2
Women's Singles 2nd round	(Croatia) Petra Martić	(France) Marion Bartoli [8]	6–2, 3–6, 6–3
Men's Singles 2nd round	(Germany) Cedrik-Marcel Stebe vs (France) Jo-Wilfried Tsonga [5]		2–6, 6–4, 1–1, suspended

== Day 5 (31 May) ==
- Schedule of Play
- Seeds out:
  - Men's Singles: (United States) John Isner [10], (Germany) Philipp Kohlschreiber [24], (Australia) Bernard Tomic [25], (Serbia) Victor Troicki [28], (Germany) Florian Mayer [32]
  - Women's Singles: (Russia) Maria Kirilenko [16], (Serbia) Jelena Janković [19]
  - Men's Doubles: (India) Mahesh Bhupathi / (India) Rohan Bopanna [6]
  - Women's Doubles: (United States) Raquel Kops-Jones / (United States) Abigail Spears [10]

Matches on main courts
Matches on Court Philippe Chatrier (Center Court)
Event	Winner	Loser	Score
Men's Singles 2nd round	(United Kingdom) Andy Murray [4]	(Finland) Jarkko Nieminen	1–6, 6–4, 6–1, 6–2
Women's Singles 2nd round	(Denmark) Caroline Wozniacki [9]	(Australia) Jarmila Gajdošová	6–1, 6–4
Men's Singles 2nd round	(France) Paul-Henri Mathieu [WC]	(United States) John Isner [10]	6–7^{(2–7)}, 6–4, 6–4, 3–6, 18–16
Matches on Court Suzanne Lenglen (Grandstand)
Event	Winner	Loser	Score
Women's Singles 2nd round	(Czech Republic) Petra Kvitová [4]	(Poland) Urszula Radwańska	6–1, 6–3
Men's Singles 2nd round	(France) Jo-Wilfried Tsonga [5]	(Germany) Cedrik-Marcel Stebe	6–2, 4–6, 6–2, 6–1
Men's Singles 2nd round	(Spain) Rafael Nadal [2]	(Uzbekistan) Denis Istomin	6–2, 6–2, 6–0
Women's Singles 2nd round	(China) Li Na [7]	(France) Stéphanie Foretz Gacon	6–0, 6–2
Men's Singles 2nd round	(France) Richard Gasquet [17]	(Bulgaria) Grigor Dimitrov	5–7, 7–5, 6–2, 6–3

== Day 6 (1 June) ==
- Schedule of Play
- Seeds out:
  - Men's Singles: (France) Gilles Simon [11], (Spain) Fernando Verdasco [14], (Croatia) Marin Čilić [21], (South Africa) Kevin Anderson [31]
  - Women's Singles: (Poland) Agnieszka Radwańska [3], (Serbia) Ana Ivanovic [13], (Italy) Flavia Pennetta [18], (Russia) Nadia Petrova [27], (Spain) Anabel Medina Garrigues [29]
  - Men's Doubles: (Sweden) Robert Lindstedt / (Romania) Horia Tecău [5], (Czech Republic) František Čermák / (Slovakia) Filip Polášek [9], (Mexico) Santiago González / (Germany) Christopher Kas [11], (Israel) Jonathan Erlich / (Israel) Andy Ram [13]
  - Women's Doubles: (South Africa) Natalie Grandin / (Czech Republic) Vladimíra Uhlířová [9], (New Zealand) Marina Erakovic / (Romania) Monica Niculescu [16], (Argentina) Gisela Dulko / (Argentina) Paola Suárez [17]

Matches on main courts
Matches on Court Philippe Chatrier (Center Court)
Event	Winner	Loser	Score
Women's Singles 3rd round	(United States) Sloane Stephens	(France) Mathilde Johansson	6–3, 6–2
Women's Singles 3rd round	(Russia) Svetlana Kuznetsova [26]	(Poland) Agnieszka Radwańska [3]	6–1, 6–2
Men's Singles 3rd round	(France) Jo-Wilfried Tsonga [5]	(Italy) Fabio Fognini	7–5, 6–4, 6–4
Men's Singles 3rd round	(Switzerland) Roger Federer [3]	(France) Nicolas Mahut	6–3, 4–6, 6–2, 7–5
Matches on Court Suzanne Lenglen (Grandstand)
Event	Winner	Loser	Score
Women's Singles 3rd round	(Italy) Sara Errani [21]	(Serbia) Ana Ivanovic [13]	1–6, 7–5, 6–3
Women's Singles 2nd round	(Russia) Maria Sharapova [2]	(Japan) Ayumi Morita	6–1, 6–1
Men's Singles 3rd round	(Switzerland) Stanislas Wawrinka [18]	(France) Gilles Simon [11]	7–5, 6–7^{(5–7)}, 6–7^{(3–7)}, 6–3, 6–2
Men's Singles 3rd round	(Serbia) Novak Djokovic [1]	(France) Nicolas Devilder [Q]	6–1, 6–2, 6–2

== Day 7 (2 June) ==
- Schedule of Play
- Seeds out:
  - Men's Singles: (Canada) Milos Raonic [19], (Russia) Mikhail Youzhny [27], (France) Julien Benneteau [29]
  - Women's Singles: (Denmark) Caroline Wozniacki [9], (Italy) Francesca Schiavone [14], (Russia) Anastasia Pavlyuchenkova [22], (Germany) Julia Görges [25], (China) Peng Shuai [28]
  - Men's Doubles: (Poland) Mariusz Fyrstenberg / (Poland) Marcin Matkowski [4], (India) Leander Paes / (Austria) Alexander Peya [7], (Austria) Jürgen Melzer / (Germany) Philipp Petzschner [8]
  - Women's Doubles: (Spain) Anabel Medina Garrigues / (Spain) Arantxa Parra Santonja [11]
  - Mixed Doubles: (Slovenia) Katarina Srebotnik / (Serbia) Nenad Zimonjić [3], (Russia) Nadia Petrova / (Canada) Daniel Nestor [6]

Matches on main courts
Matches on Court Philippe Chatrier (Center Court)
Event	Winner	Loser	Score
Women's Singles 3rd round	(Czech Republic) Petra Kvitová [4]	(Russia) Nina Bratchikova	6–2, 4–6, 6–1
Men's Singles 3rd round	(Serbia) Janko Tipsarević [8]	(France) Julien Benneteau [29]	6–3, 7–5, 6–4
Women's Singles 3rd round	(Russia) Maria Sharapova [2]	(China) Peng Shuai [28]	6–2, 6–1
Men's Singles 3rd round	(Spain) Rafael Nadal [2]	(Argentina) Eduardo Schwank [Q]	6–1, 6–3, 6–4
Matches on Court Suzanne Lenglen (Grandstand)
Event	Winner	Loser	Score
Men's Singles 3rd round	(Spain) David Ferrer [6]	(Russia) Mikhail Youzhny [27]	6–0, 6–2, 6–2
Women's Singles 3rd round	(China) Li Na [7]	(United States) Christina McHale	3–6, 6–2, 6–1
Men's Singles 3rd round	(France) Richard Gasquet [17]	(Germany) Tommy Haas [Q]	6–7^{(3–7)}, 6–3, 6–0, 6–0
Women's Singles 3rd round	(Estonia) Kaia Kanepi [23]	(Denmark) Caroline Wozniacki [9]	6–1, 6–7^{(3–7)}, 6–3

== Day 8 (3 June) ==
- Schedule of Play
- Seeds out:
  - Men's Singles: (Italy) Andreas Seppi [22]
  - Women's Singles: (Belarus) Victoria Azarenka [1], (Russia) Svetlana Kuznetsova [26]
  - Men's Doubles: (United States) Eric Butorac / (Brazil) Bruno Soares [12], (United States) Scott Lipsky / (United States) Rajeev Ram [15], (Colombia) Juan Sebastián Cabal / (Colombia) Robert Farah Maksoud [16]

Matches on main courts
Matches on Court Philippe Chatrier (Center Court)
Event	Winner	Loser	Score
Women's Singles 4th round	(Italy) Sara Errani [21]	(Russia) Svetlana Kuznetsova [26]	6–0, 7–5
Men's Singles 4th round	(Serbia) Novak Djokovic [1]	(Italy) Andreas Seppi [22]	4–6, 6–7^{(5–7)}, 6–3, 7–5, 6–3
Men's Singles 4th round	(Switzerland) Stanislas Wawrinka [18] vs. (France) Jo-Wilfried Tsonga [5]		4–6, 6–7^{(6–8)}, 6–3, 6–3, 2–4, suspended
Matches on Court Suzanne Lenglen (Grandstand)
Event	Winner	Loser	Score
Women's Singles 4th round	(Germany) Angelique Kerber [10]	(Croatia) Petra Martić	6–3, 7–5
Women's Singles 4th round	(Slovakia) Dominika Cibulková [15]	(Belarus) Victoria Azarenka [1]	6–2, 7–6^{(7–4)}
Men's Singles 4th round	(Switzerland) Roger Federer [3]	(Belgium) David Goffin [LL]	5–7, 7–5, 6–2, 6–4
Men's Singles 4th round	(Argentina) Juan Martín del Potro [9] vs. (Czech Republic) Tomáš Berdych [7]		7–6^{(8–6)}, 1–6, 6–3, suspended

== Day 9 (4 June) ==
- Schedule of Play

Peschke/Bryan couple was eliminated in the quarterfinals of Mixed Doubles draw.

- Seeds out:
  - Men's Singles: (Czech Republic) Tomáš Berdych [7], (Serbia) Janko Tipsarević [8], (Argentina) Juan Mónaco [13], (France) Richard Gasquet [17], (Switzerland) Stanislas Wawrinka [18], (Spain) Marcel Granollers [20]
  - Women's Singles: (China) Li Na [7]
  - Women's Doubles: (Russia) Ekaterina Makarova / (Russia) Elena Vesnina [6], (Australia) Jarmila Gajdošová / (Australia) Anastasia Rodionova [14]
  - Mixed Doubles: (Czech Republic) Květa Peschke / (United States) Mike Bryan [2]

Matches on main courts
Matches on Court Philippe Chatrier (Center Court)
Event	Winner	Loser	Score
Men's Singles 4th round	(Spain) David Ferrer [6]	(Spain) Marcel Granollers [20]	6–3, 6–2, 6–0
Men's Singles 4th round	(France) Jo-Wilfried Tsonga [5]	(Switzerland) Stanislas Wawrinka [18]	6–4, 7–6^{(8–6)}, 3–6, 3–6, 6–4
Women's Singles 4th round	(Russia) Maria Sharapova [2]	(Czech Republic) Klára Zakopalová	6–4, 6–7^{(5–7)}, 6–2
Men's Singles 4th round	(United Kingdom) Andy Murray [4]	(France) Richard Gasquet [17]	1–6, 6–4, 6–1, 6–2
Matches on Court Suzanne Lenglen (Grandstand)
Event	Winner	Loser	Score
Men's Singles 4th round	(Spain) Nicolás Almagro [12]	(Serbia) Janko Tipsarević [8]	6–4, 6–4, 6–4
Men's Singles 4th round	(Argentina) Juan Martín del Potro [9]	(Czech Republic) Tomáš Berdych [7]	7–6^{(8–6)}, 1–6, 6–3, 7–5
Women's Singles 4th round	(Kazakhstan) Yaroslava Shvedova [Q]	(China) Li Na [7]	3–6, 6–2, 6–0
Men's Singles 4th round	(Spain) Rafael Nadal [2]	(Argentina) Juan Mónaco [13]	6–2, 6–0, 6–0
Women's Singles 4th round	(Estonia) Kaia Kanepi [23]	(Netherlands) Arantxa Rus	6–1, 4–6, 6–0

== Day 10 (5 June) ==
- Schedule of Play
- Seeds out:
  - Men's Singles: (France) Jo-Wilfried Tsonga [5], (Argentina) Juan Martín del Potro [9]
  - Women's Singles: (Germany) Angelique Kerber [10], (Slovakia) Dominika Cibulková [15]
  - Men's Doubles: (France) Michaël Llodra / (Serbia) Nenad Zimonjić [3]
  - Women's Doubles: (Czech Republic) Květa Peschke / (Slovenia) Katarina Srebotnik [2], (United States) Vania King / (Kazakhstan) Yaroslava Shvedova [3]
  - Mixed Doubles: (United States) Liezel Huber / (Belarus) Max Mirnyi [1]

Matches on main courts
Matches on Court Philippe Chatrier (Center Court)
Event	Winner	Loser	Score
Women's Singles Quarterfinals	(Australia) Samantha Stosur [6]	(Slovakia) Dominika Cibulková [15]	6–4, 6–1
Men's Singles Quarterfinals	(Serbia) Novak Djokovic [1]	(France) Jo-Wilfried Tsonga [5]	6–1, 5–7, 5–7, 7–6^{(8–6)}, 6–1
Matches on Court Suzanne Lenglen (Grandstand)
Event	Winner	Loser	Score
Women's Singles Quarterfinals	(Italy) Sara Errani [21]	(Germany) Angelique Kerber [10]	6–3, 7–6^{(7–2)}
Men's Singles Quarterfinals	(Switzerland) Roger Federer [3]	(Argentina) Juan Martín del Potro [9]	3–6, 6–7^{(4–7)}, 6–2, 6–0, 6–3

== Day 11 (6 June) ==
- Schedule of Play
- Seeds out:
  - Men's Singles: (United Kingdom) Andy Murray [4], (Spain) Nicolás Almagro [12]
  - Women's Singles: (Estonia) Kaia Kanepi [23]
  - Women's Doubles: (Spain) Nuria Llagostera Vives / (Spain) María José Martínez Sánchez [12]
  - Mixed Doubles: (Russia) Elena Vesnina / (India) Leander Paes [5]

Matches on main courts
Matches on Court Philippe Chatrier (Center Court)
Event	Winner	Loser	Score
Women's Singles Quarterfinals	(Russia) Maria Sharapova [2]	(Estonia) Kaia Kanepi [23]	6–2, 6–3
Men's Singles Quarterfinals	(Spain) Rafael Nadal [2]	(Spain) Nicolás Almagro [12]	7–6^{(7–4)}, 6–2, 6–3
Women's Doubles Semifinals	(Russia) Maria Kirilenko / (Russia) Nadia Petrova [7] vs. (Czech Republic) Andrea Hlaváčková / (Czech Republic) Lucie Hradecká [5]		4–6, 7–5, suspended
Matches on Court Suzanne Lenglen (Grandstand)
Event	Winner	Loser	Score
Women's Singles Quarterfinals	(Czech Republic) Petra Kvitová [4]	(Kazakhstan) Yaroslava Shvedova [Q]	3–6, 6–2, 6–4
Men's Singles Quarterfinals	(Spain) David Ferrer [6]	(United Kingdom) Andy Murray [4]	6–4, 6–7^{(3–7)}, 6–3, 6–2

== Day 12 (7 June) ==
- Schedule of Play
- Seeds out:
  - Women's Singles: (Czech Republic) Petra Kvitová [4], (Australia) Samantha Stosur [6]
  - Men's Doubles: (Pakistan) Aisam-ul-Haq Qureshi / (Netherlands) Jean-Julien Rojer [10], (Italy) Daniele Bracciali / (Italy) Potito Starace [14]
  - Women's Doubles: (Czech Republic) Andrea Hlaváčková / (Czech Republic) Lucie Hradecká [5]

Matches on main courts
Matches on Court Philippe Chatrier (Center Court)
Event	Winner	Loser	Score
Women's Singles Semifinals	(Italy) Sara Errani [21]	(Australia) Samantha Stosur [6]	7–5, 1–6, 6–3
Women's Singles Semifinals	(Russia) Maria Sharapova [2]	(Czech Republic) Petra Kvitová [4]	6–3, 6–3
Mixed Doubles Final	(India) Sania Mirza [7] (India) Mahesh Bhupathi [7]	(Poland) Klaudia Jans-Ignacik [Alt] (Mexico) Santiago González [Alt]	7–6^{(7–3)}, 6–1
Matches on Court Suzanne Lenglen (Grandstand)
Event	Winner	Loser	Score
Men's Legends Over 45	(France) Guy Forget (France) Henri Leconte	(Australia) Peter McNamara (Australia) Mark Woodforde	7–5, 6–4
Women's Doubles Semifinals	(Russia) Maria Kirilenko [7] (Russia) Nadia Petrova [7]	(Czech Republic) Andrea Hlaváčková [5] (Czech Republic) Lucie Hradecká [5]	4–6, 7–5, 7–5
Men's Doubles Semifinals	(Belarus) Max Mirnyi [1] (Canada) Daniel Nestor [1]	(Italy) Daniele Bracciali [14] (Italy) Potito Starace [14]	6–3, 6–4
Men's Doubles Semifinals	(United States) Bob Bryan [2] (United States) Mike Bryan [2]	(Pakistan) Aisam-ul-Haq Qureshi [10] (Netherlands) Jean-Julien Rojer [10]	6–3, 7–6^{(8–6)}

== Day 13 (8 June) ==
- Schedule of Play
- Seeds out:
  - Men's Singles: (Switzerland) Roger Federer [3], (Spain) David Ferrer [6]
  - Women's Doubles: (Russia) Maria Kirilenko / (Russia) Nadia Petrova [7]

Matches on main courts
Matches on Court Philippe Chatrier (Center Court)
Event	Winner	Loser	Score
Men's Singles Semifinals	(Spain) Rafael Nadal [2]	(Spain) David Ferrer [6]	6–2, 6–2, 6–1
Men's Singles Semifinals	(Serbia) Novak Djokovic [1]	(Switzerland) Roger Federer [3]	6–4, 7–5, 6–3
Matches on Court Suzanne Lenglen (Grandstand)
Event	Winner	Loser	Score
Legends Over 45 Doubles	(Australia) Peter McNamara (Australia) Mark Woodforde	(Iran) Mansour Bahrami (Austria) Thomas Muster	5–7, 6–2, [10–5]
Legends Under 45 Doubles	(Sweden) Thomas Enqvist (Australia) Todd Woodbridge	(Spain) Sergi Bruguera (Netherlands) Richard Krajicek	3–6, 6–3, [10–5]
Women's Doubles Final	(Italy) Sara Errani [4] (Italy) Roberta Vinci [4]	(Russia) Maria Kirilenko [7] (Russia) Nadia Petrova [7]	4–6, 6–4, 6–2

== Day 14 (9 June) ==
- Schedule of Play
- Seeds out:
  - Women's Singles: (Italy) Sara Errani [21]
  - Men's Doubles: (United States) Bob Bryan / (United States) Mike Bryan [2]

Matches on main courts
Matches on Court Philippe Chatrier (Center Court)
Event	Winner	Loser	Score
Women's Singles Final	(Russia) Maria Sharapova [2]	(Italy) Sara Errani [21]	6–3, 6–2
Men's Doubles Final	(Belarus) Max Mirnyi [1] (Canada) Daniel Nestor [1]	(United States) Bob Bryan [2] (United States) Mike Bryan [2]	6–4, 6–4
Matches on Court Suzanne Lenglen (Grandstand)
Event	Winner	Loser	Score
Women's Legends Doubles Final	(United States) Lindsay Davenport (Switzerland) Martina Hingis	(United States) Martina Navratilova (Czech Republic) Jana Novotná	6–4, 6–4
Men's Legends Over 45 Doubles	(United States) John McEnroe (United States) Patrick McEnroe	(Sweden) Mikael Pernfors (Sweden) Mats Wilander	6–7^{(5–7)}, 6–2, [10–5]

== Day 15 (10 June) ==
- Schedule of Play

Matches on main courts
Matches on Court Suzanne Lenglen (Grandstand)
Event	Winner	Loser	Score
Legends Over 45 Doubles Final	(United States) John McEnroe (United States) Patrick McEnroe	(France) Guy Forget (France) Henri Leconte	7–6^{(7–5)}, 6–3
Legends Under 45 Doubles Final	(Spain) Albert Costa (Spain) Carlos Moyá	(Sweden) Thomas Enqvist (Australia) Todd Woodbridge	6–2, 6–1

== Day 16 (11 June) ==
- Schedule of Play
- Seeds out:
  - Men's Singles: (Serbia) Novak Djokovic [1]

Matches on main courts
Matches on Court Philippe Chatrier (Center Court)
Event	Winner	Loser	Score
Men's Singles Final	(Spain) Rafael Nadal [2]	(Serbia) Novak Djokovic [1]	6–4, 6–3, 2–6, 7–5
