= Stéphane Houdet =

French wheelchair tennis player (born 1970)

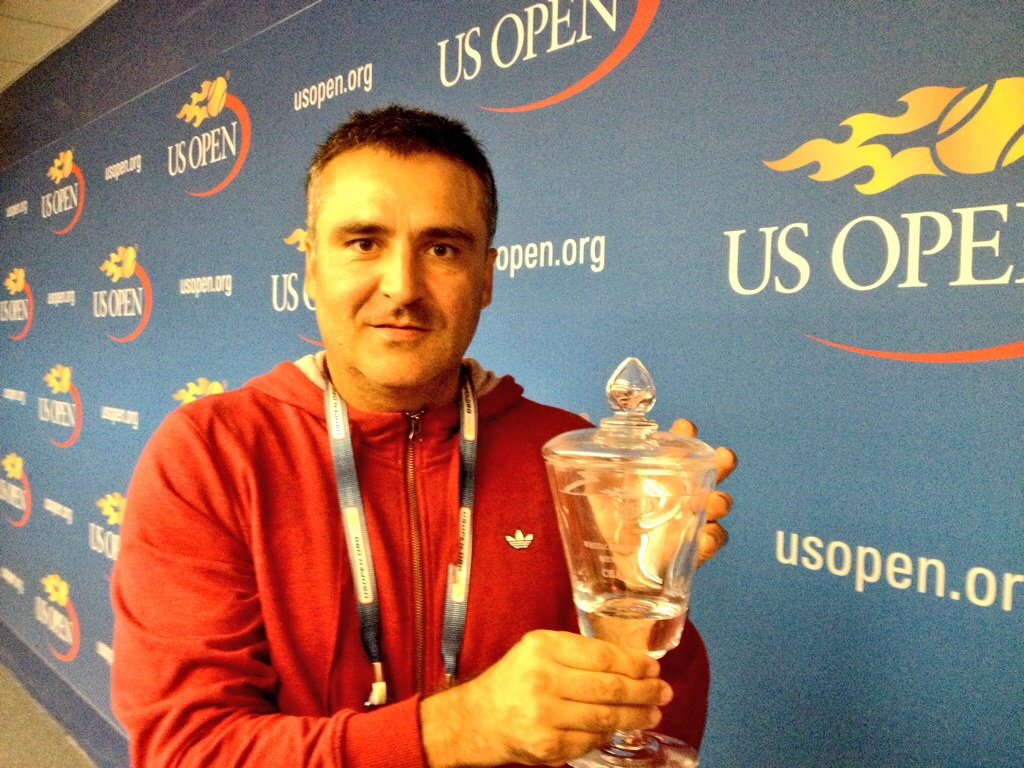
- Houdet at the 2013 US Open, New York
- Country (sports): France
- Residence: Paris
- Born: 20 November 1970 (age 55) Saint-Nazaire, Loire Atlantique
- Turned pro: 2005
- Plays: Right-handed (one-handed backhand)
- Official website: StephaneHoudet.jimdo.com/

Singles
- Career record: 544–170
- Career titles: 32
- Highest ranking: No. 1 (11 June 2012)
- Current ranking: No. 4 (3 September 2018)

Grand Slam singles results
- Australian Open: F (2009, 2010, 2011, 2013, 2015, 2018)
- French Open: W (2012, 2013)
- Wimbledon: SF (2016, 2019, 2021)
- US Open: W (2013, 2017)

Other tournaments
- Masters: W (2011)
- Paralympic Games: Silver Medal (2012)

Doubles
- Career record: 488–101
- Career titles: 60
- Highest ranking: No. 1 (26 January 2009)
- Current ranking: No. 1 (3 September 2018)

Grand Slam doubles results
- Australian Open: W (2010, 2014, 2015, 2016, 2018)
- French Open: W (2007, 2009, 2010, 2013, 2014, 2017, 2018)
- Wimbledon: W (2009, 2013, 2014)
- US Open: W (2009, 2011, 2014, 2015, 2023)

Other doubles tournaments
- Masters Doubles: W (2006, 2007, 2013, 2014, 2016, 2018)
- Paralympic Games: Gold Medal (2008, 2016, 2020); Bronze Medal (2012)

Team competitions
- World Team Cup: W (2009, 2012, 2013, 2014, 2016, 2017)

Stéphane Houdet (born 20 November 1970) is a French wheelchair tennis player. Houdet is a former singles and doubles world number one. In 2014, he became the first man in history to complete the calendar-year Grand Slam in men's wheelchair doubles.

He competed in wheelchair tennis at the 2020 Summer Paralympics.

In July 2022, Houdet was suspended from competition after missing three anti-doping tests in a 12-month window.

== 2013 ==
Houdet won two titles in the 2013 season with the victories achieved in Johannesburg and Sardinia. He was a losing finalist in Pensacola, Rome, Nottingham, St Louis and Rue. Houdet also won two Grand Slam singles titles at Roland Garros and New York and was the runner-up in Melbourne. Houdet partnered Ronald Vink to the doubles titles in Sydney and Nottingham. When Frédéric Cattanéo was his partner in doubles tournaments they won titles in Baton Rouge and Johannesburg. They were also losing finalists in Pensacola. In doubles tournaments with Martin Legner Houdet won the title in Rome and was a losing finalist in Sardinia. Shingo Kunieda partnered Houdet to doubles titles in Paris and St Louis, as well as two Grand Slam titles at Roland Garros and Wimbledon. Partnering Gordon Reid, Houdet won titles in Rotterdam, Rue, the Masters doubles.

== Grand Slam titles ==
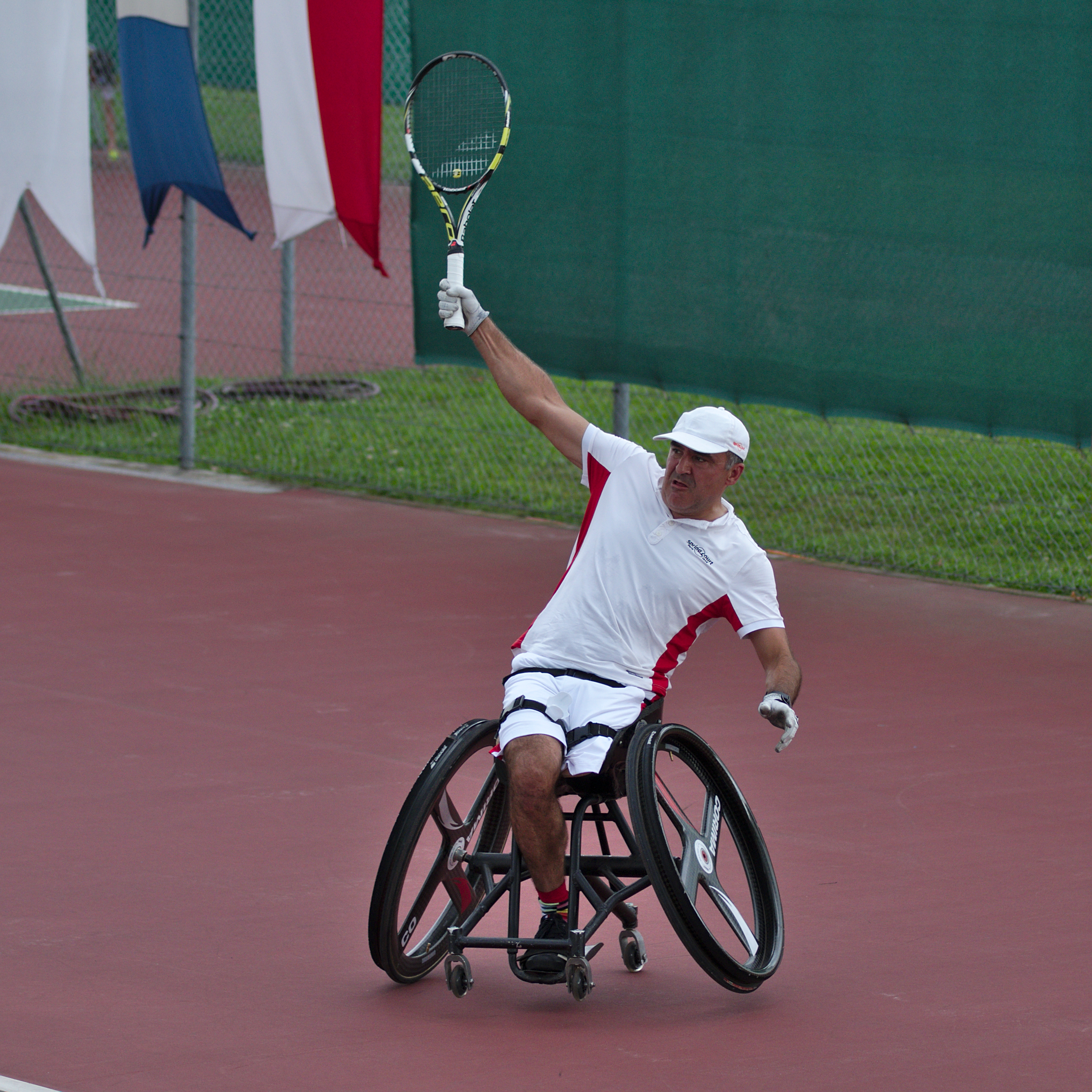
Houdet in Geneva in 2014

- 2007 French Open – Wheelchair men's doubles
- 2009 French Open – Wheelchair men's doubles
- 2009 Wimbledon Championships – Wheelchair men's doubles
- 2009 US Open – Wheelchair men's doubles
- 2010 Australian Open – Wheelchair men's doubles
- 2010 French Open – Wheelchair men's doubles
- 2011 US Open – Wheelchair men's doubles
- 2012 French Open – Wheelchair men's singles
- 2013 French Open – Wheelchair men's singles
- 2013 French Open – Wheelchair men's doubles
- 2013 Wimbledon Championships – Wheelchair men's doubles
- 2013 US Open – Wheelchair men's singles
- 2014 Australian Open – Wheelchair men's doubles
- 2014 French Open – Wheelchair men's doubles
- 2014 Wimbledon Championships – Wheelchair men's doubles
- 2014 US Open – Wheelchair men's doubles
- 2015 Australian Open – Wheelchair men's doubles
- 2017 US Open – Wheelchair men's singles

== Performance timelines ==
Key
W	F	SF	QF	#R	RR	Q#	DNQ	A	NH

(W) winner; (F) finalist; (SF) semifinalist; (QF) quarterfinalist; (#R) rounds 4, 3, 2, 1; (RR) round-robin stage; (Q#) qualification round; (DNQ) did not qualify; (A) absent; (NH) not held; (SR) strike rate (events won / competed); (W–L) win–loss record.
To avoid confusion and double counting, these charts are updated at the conclusion of a tournament or when the player's participation has ended.

=== Wheelchair singles ===
Tournament	2007	2008	2009	2010	2011	2012	2013	2014	2015	2016	2017	2018	2019	2020	2021	2022	2023	2024	2025	2026	SR	Win %
Australian Open	2R	SF	F	F	F	SF	F	SF	F	SF	SF	F	SF	QF	QF	SF	A	QF	1R		0 / 18	0%
French Open	QF	QF	F	SF	SF	W	W	F	F	SF	QF	SF	QF	QF	SF	QF	1R	1R			2 / 18	11%
Wimbledon	Not held									SF	QF	QF	SF	NH	SF	A	A	A			0 / 5	0%
US Open	SF	NH	QF	SF	F	NH	W	SF	F	NH	W	QF	F	QF	QF	A	SF	NH			2 / 13	15%

=== Wheelchair doubles ===
Tournament	2007	2008	2009	2010	2011	2012	2013	2014	2015	2016	2017	2018	2019	2020	2021	2022	2023	2024	SR	Win %
Australian Open	SF	SF	SF	W	F	F	SF	W	W	W	SF	W	F	F	F	SF	A	SF	5 / 17	29%
French Open	W	SF	W	W	SF	SF	W	W	SF	SF	W	W	F	SF	F	SF	SF	SF	7 / 18	39%
Wimbledon	A	F	W	F	F	SF	W	W	SF	F	F	SF	SF	NH	SF	A	A	A	3 / 13	23%
US Open	SF	NH	W	SF	W	NH	SF	W	W	NH	F	SF	F	F	SF	A	W		5 / 13	38%

Awards
Preceded by Maikel Scheffers	ITF Wheelchair Tennis World Champion; 2012	Succeeded by Shingo Kunieda
