= 2012 French Open – Girls' singles =

Girls' singles
- 2012 French Open

Final
- Champion: (Germany) Annika Beck
- Runner-up: (Slovakia) Anna Karolína Schmiedlová
- Score: 3–6, 7–5, 6–3

Events
Singles	men	women		boys	girls
Doubles	men	women	mixed	boys	girls
WC Singles	men	women	quad
WC Doubles	men	women	quad
Legends	−45	45+	women
← 2011 ·	French Open	· 2013 →

Annika Beck won the title, defeating Anna Karolína Schmiedlová in the final, 3–6, 7–5, 6–3.

Ons Jabeur was the defending champion, but chose not to participate. She received a wildcard into the women's singles qualifying competition where she lost to Heather Watson in the second round.

== Seeds ==
1. (United States) Taylor Townsend (third round)
2. (Germany) Annika Beck (champion)
3. (Russia) Elizaveta Kulichkova (first round)
4. (Russia) Irina Khromacheva (first round)
5. (Czech Republic) Kateřina Siniaková (quarterfinals)
6. (Kazakhstan) Anna Danilina (second round)
7. (Canada) Eugenie Bouchard (third round)
8. (Croatia) Donna Vekić (second round)
9. (United States) Chalena Scholl (quarterfinals)
10. (United States) Sachia Vickery (first round)
11. (Paraguay) Montserrat González (third round)
12. (Estonia) Anett Kontaveit (semifinals)
13. (Russia) Daria Gavrilova (first round)
14. (Bolivia) María Inés Deheza (first round)
15. (Switzerland) Belinda Bencic (first round)
16. (United States) Allie Kiick (quarterfinals)

== Main draw ==
=== Key ===
- Q = Qualifier
- WC = Wild card
- LL = Lucky loser
- Alt = Alternate
- SE = Special exempt
- PR = Protected ranking
- ITF = ITF entry
- JE = Junior exempt
- w/o = Walkover
- r = Retired
- d = Defaulted
- SR = Special ranking

=== Finals ===
Quarterfinals
(Slovakia) Anna Karolína Schmiedlová	7^{7}	3	6
5	(Czech Republic) Kateřina Siniaková	6^{5}	6	1
Q	(Germany) Antonia Lottner	6	7
WC	(France) Clothilde de Bernardi	2	5
12	(Estonia) Anett Kontaveit	6	6
16	(United States) Allie Kiick	0	3
9	(United States) Chalena Scholl	4	3
2	(Germany) Annika Beck	6	6

Semifinals
(Slovakia) Anna Karolína Schmiedlová	7	6
Q	(Germany) Antonia Lottner	5	1
12	(Estonia) Anett Kontaveit	3	3
2	(Germany) Annika Beck	6	6

Final
(Slovakia) Anna Karolína Schmiedlová	6	5	3
2	(Germany) Annika Beck	3	7	6

=== Top half ===
==== Section 1 ====
First round
1	(United States) Taylor Townsend	7	6
WC	(France) Manon Arcangioli	5	2
(Canada) Carol Zhao	6	6
LL	(Belgium) Justine De Sutter	0	1
(Romania) Ilka Csöregi	6^{6}	6	7
(Egypt) Mayar Sherif	7^{8}	3	5
(Slovakia) Anna Karolína Schmiedlová	7^{8}	6
13	(Russia) Daria Gavrilova	6^{6}	2
11	(Paraguay) Montserrat González	6	6
SE	(Mexico) Victoria Rodríguez	4	4
WC	(France) Jade Suvrijn	3	2
(United States) Jennifer Brady	6	6
(Brazil) Laura Pigossi	6	0	6
LL	(Russia) Elena Maltseva	3	6	1
Q	(Italy) Camilla Rosatello	2	2
5	(Czech Republic) Kateřina Siniaková	6	6

Second round
1	(United States) T Townsend	6^{1}	7^{7}	6
(Canada) C Zhao	7^{7}	6^{5}	4
(Romania) I Csöregi	6	0	2
(Slovakia) AK Schmiedlová	3	6	6
11	(Paraguay) M González	6	6
(United States) J Brady	4	2
(Brazil) L Pigossi	7^{7}	6^{2}	1
5	(Czech Republic) K Siniaková	6^{5}	7^{7}	6

Third round
1	(United States) T Townsend	7	2	1
(Slovakia) AK Schmiedlová	5	6	6
11	(Paraguay) M González	3	1
5	(Czech Republic) K Siniaková	6	6

Quarterfinals
(Slovakia) AK Schmiedlová	7^{7}	3	6
5	(Czech Republic) K Siniaková	6^{5}	6	1

==== Section 2 ====
First round
4	(Russia) Irina Khromacheva	2	1
Q	(Germany) Antonia Lottner	6	6
(India) Ratnika Batra	6	6
WC	(France) Estelle Cascino	0	1
(Indonesia) Aldila Sutjiadi	3	3
(United States) Kyle McPhillips	6	6
(Canada) Françoise Abanda	7^{7}	7^{7}
15	(Switzerland) Belinda Bencic	6^{4}	6^{4}
10	(United States) Sachia Vickery	4	3
Q	(Russia) Daria Salnikova	6	6
LL	(Russia) Darya Kasatkina	5	3
WC	(France) Clothilde de Bernardi	7	6
Q	(Sweden) Rebecca Peterson	0	6	7
(Argentina) Constanza Vega	6	3	5
Q	(Belarus) Ilona Kremen	2	3
8	(Croatia) Donna Vekić	6	6

Second round
Q	(Germany) A Lottner	6	6
(India) R Batra	1	2
(United States) K McPhillips	1	5
(Canada) F Abanda	6	7
Q	(Russia) D Salnikova	4	6	9
WC	(France) C de Bernardi	6	2	11
Q	(Sweden) R Peterson	6	6^{2}	6
8	(Croatia) D Vekić	3	7^{7}	4

Third round
Q	(Germany) A Lottner	2	7^{8}	6
(Canada) F Abanda	6	6^{6}	3
WC	(France) C de Bernardi	6	7^{7}
Q	(Sweden) R Peterson	2	6^{5}

Quarterfinals
Q	(Germany) A Lottner	6	7
WC	(France) C de Bernardi	2	5

=== Bottom half ===
==== Section 3 ====
First round
7	(Canada) Eugenie Bouchard	6	6
WC	(France) Fiona Ferro	4	0
(Belgium) Elise Mertens	6	6
Q	(Romania) Ioana Loredana Roșca	0	0
(United States) Krista Hardebeck	6^{2}	3
(Liechtenstein) Kathinka von Deichmann	7^{7}	6
(Russia) Varvara Flink	6	3	4
12	(Estonia) Anett Kontaveit	1	6	6
16	(United States) Allie Kiick	6	6
(New Zealand) Emily Fanning	2	1
WC	(France) Lou Brouleau	1	4
(Russia) Alina Silich	6	6
(Uzbekistan) Sabina Sharipova	7	2	5
(Slovakia) Petra Uberalová	5	6	7
(Mexico) Marcela Zacarías	6	7
3	(Russia) Elizaveta Kulichkova	4	5

Second round
7	(Canada) E Bouchard	6	7^{7}
(Belgium) E Mertens	2	6^{4}
(Liechtenstein) K von Deichmann	6	1	2
12	(Estonia) A Kontaveit	4	6	6
16	(United States) A Kiick	6	6
(Russia) A Silich	4	2
(Slovakia) P Uberalová	6	6
(Mexico) M Zacarías	2	4

Third round
7	(Canada) E Bouchard	6^{1}	2
12	(Estonia) A Kontaveit	7^{7}	6
16	(United States) A Kiick	6	5	6
(Slovakia) P Uberalová	2	7	3

Quarterfinals
12	(Estonia) A Kontaveit	6	6
16	(United States) A Kiick	0	3

==== Section 4 ====
First round
6	(Kazakhstan) Anna Danilina	7	6
(Czech Republic) Barbora Krejčíková	5	2
Q	(Russia) Olga Doroshina	6	6
(Canada) Erin Routliffe	3	0
(Croatia) Iva Mekovec	3	6^{6}
WC	(France) Océane Dodin	6	7^{8}
(Belgium) Elke Lemmens	3	4
9	(United States) Chalena Scholl	6	6
14	(Bolivia) María Inés Deheza	0	3
(Belarus) Aliaksandra Sasnovich	6	6
(Brazil) Beatriz Haddad Maia	6	6
WC	(France) Pauline Payet	1	2
(Russia) Victoria Kan	6	6
(Poland) Zuzanna Maciejewska	3	1
(Argentina) Victoria Bosio	2	1
2	(Germany) Annika Beck	6	6

Second round
6	(Kazakhstan) A Danilina	6^{4}	6	4
Q	(Russia) O Doroshina	7^{7}	4	6
WC	(France) O Dodin	0	2
9	(United States) C Scholl	6	6
(Belarus) A Sasnovich	2	4
(Brazil) B Haddad Maia	6	6
(Russia) V Kan	4	2
2	(Germany) A Beck	6	6

Third round
Q	(Russia) O Doroshina	1	2
9	(United States) C Scholl	6	6
(Brazil) B Haddad Maia	2	4
2	(Germany) A Beck	6	6

Quarterfinals
9	(United States) C Scholl	4	3
2	(Germany) A Beck	6	6
