= Frédéric Cattanéo =

French wheelchair tennis player

- Country (sports): France
- Residence: Le Mans, France
- Born: 3 December 1978 (age 46); Sale, Morocco
- Height: 1.70 m (5 ft 7 in)
- Turned pro: 2003
- Plays: Right-handed (one-handed backhand)

Singles
- Career titles: 37
- Highest ranking: No. 9 (30 May 2011)
- Current ranking: No. 19 (12 October 2020)

Grand Slam singles results
- French Open: QF (2012, 2018, 2020, 2021)

Other tournaments
- Paralympic Games: 3R (2012, 2016)

Doubles
- Career titles: 62
- Highest ranking: No. 4 (15 April 2013)
- Current ranking: No. 15 (12 October 2020)

Grand Slam doubles results
- French Open: W (2012)
- Wimbledon: F (2013)

Other doubles tournaments
- Masters Doubles: W (2006)
- Paralympic Games: F (2012)
Medal record
Paralympic Games
| Silver medal – second place | 2012 London | Men's doubles |

Frédéric Cattanéo (born 3 December 1978) is a French wheelchair tennis player who competed in international level events. He is a three-time French Open singles quarterfinalist and was the 2012 French Open wheelchair men's doubles champion with Shingo Kunieda. Amputated from both legs after a motorcycle accident, he started wheelchair tennis at the age of 23 in 2002.

He competed in wheelchair tennis at the 2020 Summer Paralympics.
