= 2012 French Open – Boys' doubles =

Boys' doubles
- 2012 French Open

Final
- Champions: (Australia) Andrew Harris (Australia) Nick Kyrgios
- Runners-up: (Czech Republic) Adam Pavlásek (Czech Republic) Václav Šafránek
- Score: 6–4, 2–6, [10–7]

Events
Singles	men	women		boys	girls
Doubles	men	women	mixed	boys	girls
WC Singles	men	women	quad
WC Doubles	men	women	quad
Legends	−45	45+	women
← 2011 ·	French Open	· 2013 →

Andrés Artuñedo and Roberto Carballés were the defending champions.
Andrew Harris and Nick Kyrgios won the title by defeating Adam Pavlásek and Václav Šafránek in the final, 6–4, 2–6, [10–7]

== Seeds ==
1. (United Kingdom) Liam Broady / (United Kingdom) Joshua Ward-Hibbert (quarterfinals)
2. (Serbia) Nikola Milojević / (Portugal) Frederico Ferreira Silva (quarterfinals)
3. (Belgium) Julien Cagnina / (Australia) Luke Saville (second round)
4. (Egypt) Karim Hossam / (Canada) Filip Peliwo (first round)
5. (Argentina) Juan Ignacio Galarza / (Argentina) Mateo Nicolás Martínez (first round)
6. (United States) Mackenzie McDonald / (United States) Spencer Papa (first round)
7. (Czech Republic) Adam Pavlásek / (Czech Republic) Václav Šafránek (final)
8. (United Kingdom) Luke Bambridge / (Japan) Kaichi Uchida (second round)

== Draw ==
=== Key ===
- Q = Qualifier
- WC = Wild card
- LL = Lucky loser
- Alt = Alternate
- SE = Special exempt
- PR = Protected ranking
- ITF = ITF entry
- JE = Junior exempt
- w/o = Walkover
- r = Retired
- d = Defaulted
- SR = Special ranking

=== Finals ===
Semifinals
(France) Enzo Couacaud (France) Alexandre Favrot	1	3
(Australia) Andrew Harris (Australia) Nick Kyrgios	6	6
(Brazil) Thiago Monteiro (Italy) Gianluigi Quinzi	5	4
7	(Czech Republic) Adam Pavlásek (Czech Republic) Václav Šafránek	7	6

Final
(Australia) Andrew Harris (Australia) Nick Kyrgios	6	2	[10]
7	(Czech Republic) Adam Pavlásek (Czech Republic) Václav Šafránek	4	6	[7]

=== Top half ===
First round
1	(United Kingdom) Liam Broady (United Kingdom) Joshua Ward-Hibbert	6	6
WC	(France) Grégoire Barrère (France) Johan Sébastien Tatlot	3	1
(Israel) Bar Tzuf Botzer (United Kingdom) Kyle Edmund	7^{7}	6
(France) Mathias Bourgue (Belgium) Kimmer Coppejans	6^{4}	4
(France) Enzo Couacaud (France) Alexandre Favrot	6	6
(Russia) Anton Desyatnik (Greece) Markos Kalovelonis	3	2
(Serbia) Laslo Djere (Italy) Pietro Licciardi	6	6
5	(Argentina) Juan Ignacio Galarza (Argentina) Mateo Nicolás Martínez	3	4
3	(Belgium) Julien Cagnina (Australia) Luke Saville	6	4	[15]
(Germany) Daniel Masur (Czech Republic) Robin Staněk	4	6	[13]
(India) Arjun Kadhe (Peru) Jorge Brian Panta	6	7^{7}
(United States) Alexios Halebian (United States) Mitchell Krueger	4	6^{3}
(Australia) Andrew Harris (Australia) Nick Kyrgios	6	7
(Spain) Albert Alcaraz Ivorra (Spain) Eduard Esteve Lobato	4	5
WC	(France) Enzo Py (France) Maxime Tchoutakian	5	2
8	(United Kingdom) Luke Bambridge (Japan) Kaichi Uchida	7	6

Second round
1	(United Kingdom) L Broady (United Kingdom) JW-Hibbert	6	6
(Israel) BT Botzer (United Kingdom) K Edmund	4	3
(France) E Couacaud (France) A Favrot	6	6
(Serbia) L Djere (Italy) P Licciardi	3	2
3	(Belgium) J Cagnina (Australia) L Saville	3	6^{4}
(India) A Kadhe (Peru) JB Panta	6	7^{7}
(Australia) A Harris (Australia) N Kyrgios	5	6	[10]
8	(United Kingdom) L Bambridge (Japan) K Uchida	7	4	[8]

Quarterfinals
1	(United Kingdom) L Broady (United Kingdom) JW-Hibbert	6	3	[8]
(France) E Couacaud (France) A Favrot	3	6	[10]
(India) A Kadhe (Peru) JB Panta	2	7	[9]
(Australia) A Harris (Australia) N Kyrgios	6	5	[11]

Semifinals
(France) E Couacaud (France) A Favrot	1	3
(Australia) A Harris (Australia) N Kyrgios	6	6

=== Bottom half ===
First round
6	(United States) Mackenzie McDonald (United States) Spencer Papa	5	4
WC	(France) Laurent Lokoli (France) Armel Rancezot	7	6
(South Korea) Chung Hyeon (Burundi) Hassan Ndayshimiye	3	1
(Mexico) Lucas Gómez (United States) Thai-Son Kwiatkowski	6	6
(Japan) Yoshihito Nishioka (Finland) Herkko Pöllänen	2	1
(Brazil) Thiago Monteiro (Italy) Gianluigi Quinzi	6	6
(Netherlands) Max de Vroome (Peru) Daniel Santos	7	6
4	(Egypt) Karim Hossam (Canada) Filip Peliwo	5	4
7	(Czech Republic) Adam Pavlásek (Czech Republic) Václav Šafránek	6	1	[12]
(Italy) Matteo Donati (Italy) Stefano Napolitano	3	6	[10]
WC	(France) Quentin Halys (France) Maxime Hamou	4	6	[7]
(Croatia) Borna Ćorić (Serbia) Peđa Krstin	6	4	[10]
(Brazil) Gabriel Friedrich (United States) Noah Rubin	6	6
(Sweden) Filip Bergevi (Denmark) Mikael Torpegaard	4	3
(Uzbekistan) Temur Ismailov (Croatia) Filip Veger	0	3
2	(Serbia) Nikola Milojević (Portugal) Frederico Ferreira Silva	6	6

Second round
WC	(France) L Lokoli (France) A Rancezot	6	6^{5}	[8]
(Mexico) L Gómez (United States) T-S Kwiatkowski	3	7^{7}	[10]
(Brazil) T Monteiro (Italy) G Quinzi	6	6^{4}	[10]
(Netherlands) M de Vroome (Peru) D Santos	2	7^{7}	[7]
7	(Czech Republic) A Pavlásek (Czech Republic) V Šafránek	6	3	[10]
(Croatia) B Ćorić (Serbia) P Krstin	3	6	[6]
(Brazil) G Friedrich (United States) N Rubin	6^{5}	3
2	(Serbia) N Milojević (Portugal) FF Silva	7^{7}	6

Quarterfinals
(Mexico) L Gómez (United States) T-S Kwiatkowski	7	1	[9]
(Brazil) T Monteiro (Italy) G Quinzi	5	6	[11]
7	(Czech Republic) A Pavlásek (Czech Republic) V Šafránek	6	6^{2}	[10]
2	(Serbia) N Milojević (Portugal) FF Silva	3	7^{7}	[8]

Semifinals
(Brazil) T Monteiro (Italy) G Quinzi	5	4
7	(Czech Republic) A Pavlásek (Czech Republic) V Šafránek	7	6
