= 2012 French Open – Girls' doubles =

Girls' doubles
- 2012 French Open

Final
- Champions: (Russia) Daria Gavrilova (Russia) Irina Khromacheva
- Runners-up: (Paraguay) Montserrat González (Brazil) Beatriz Haddad Maia
- Score: 4–6, 6–4, [10–8]

Events
Singles	men	women		boys	girls
Doubles	men	women	mixed	boys	girls
WC Singles	men	women	quad
WC Doubles	men	women	quad
Legends	−45	45+	women
← 2011 ·	French Open	· 2013 →

Irina Khromacheva and Maryna Zanevska were the defending champions. Zanevska did not compete in the event, but Khromacheva retained her title alongside new partner Daria Gavrilova, with the Russian pair defeating Montserrat González and Beatriz Haddad Maia in the final, 4–6, 6–4, [10–8].

== Seeds ==
1. (Canada) Eugenie Bouchard / (United States) Taylor Townsend (semifinals)
2. (Russia) Daria Gavrilova / (Russia) Irina Khromacheva (champions)
3. (Romania) Ilka Csöregi / (Russia) Elizaveta Kulichkova (first round)
4. (Canada) Françoise Abanda / (United States) Sachia Vickery (quarterfinals)
5. (Germany) Annika Beck / (United States) Kyle McPhillips (second round)
6. (Paraguay) Montserrat González / (Brazil) Beatriz Haddad Maia (final)
7. (United States) Krista Hardebeck / (United States) Chalena Scholl (first round)
8. (Uzbekistan) Sabina Sharipova / (Canada) Carol Zhao (first round)

== Draw ==
=== Key ===
- Q = Qualifier
- WC = Wild card
- LL = Lucky loser
- Alt = Alternate
- SE = Special exempt
- PR = Protected ranking
- ITF = ITF entry
- JE = Junior exempt
- w/o = Walkover
- r = Retired
- d = Defaulted
- SR = Special ranking

=== Finals ===
Semifinals
1	(Canada) Eugenie Bouchard (United States) Taylor Townsend	2	6^{3}
6	(Paraguay) Montserrat González (Brazil) Beatriz Haddad Maia	6	7^{7}
(Belarus) Aliaksandra Sasnovich (Croatia) Donna Vekić	6	3	[7]
2	(Russia) Daria Gavrilova (Russia) Irina Khromacheva	2	6	[10]

Final
6	(Paraguay) Montserrat González (Brazil) Beatriz Haddad Maia	6	4	[8]
2	(Russia) Daria Gavrilova (Russia) Irina Khromacheva	4	6	[10]

=== Top half ===
First round
1	(Canada) Eugenie Bouchard (United States) Taylor Townsend	6	6
Alt	(Belgium) Justine De Sutter (Russia) Darya Kasatkina	1	2
(Estonia) Anett Kontaveit (Turkey) İpek Soylu	6^{5}	6	[10]
(Romania) Irina Maria Bara (Mexico) Victoria Rodríguez	7^{7}	0	[2]
WC	(France) Manon Arcangioli (France) Clothilde de Bernardi	6	1	[10]
(Russia) Olga Doroshina (Germany) Antonia Lottner	4	6	[8]
(Italy) Camilla Rosatello (Romania) Ioana Loredana Roșca	3	7^{7}	[10]
8	(Uzbekistan) Sabina Sharipova (Canada) Carol Zhao	6	6^{5}	[8]
4	(Canada) Françoise Abanda (United States) Sachia Vickery	6	6
(Poland) Zuzanna Maciejewska (Liechtenstein) Kathinka von Deichmann	3	4
WC	(France) Estelle Cascino (France) Océane Dodin	5	2
(United States) Jennifer Brady (United States) Allie Kiick	7	6
(Bolivia) María Inés Deheza (Belgium) Elke Lemmens	6	2	[11]
(Russia) Varvara Flink (Czech Republic) Kateřina Siniaková	3	6	[9]
(Slovakia) Anna Karolína Schmiedlová (Slovakia) Petra Uberalová	3	4
6	(Paraguay) Montserrat González (Brazil) Beatriz Haddad Maia	6	6

Second round
1	(Canada) E Bouchard (United States) T Townsend	6	6
(Estonia) A Kontaveit (Turkey) İ Soylu	4	4
WC	(France) M Arcangioli (France) C de Bernardi	6^{4}	5
(Italy) C Rosatello (Romania) IL Roșca	7^{7}	7
4	(Canada) F Abanda (United States) S Vickery	6	7^{7}
(United States) J Brady (United States) A Kiick	4	6^{5}
(Bolivia) MI Deheza (Belgium) E Lemmens	2	0
6	(Paraguay) M González (Brazil) B Haddad Maia	6	6

Quarterfinals
1	(Canada) E Bouchard (United States) T Townsend	6	6
(Italy) C Rosatello (Romania) IL Roșca	0	3
4	(Canada) F Abanda (United States) S Vickery	1	6	[6]
6	(Paraguay) M González (Brazil) B Haddad Maia	6	3	[10]

Semifinals
1	(Canada) E Bouchard (United States) T Townsend	2	6^{3}
6	(Paraguay) M González (Brazil) B Haddad Maia	6	7^{7}

=== Bottom half ===
First round
5	(Germany) Annika Beck (United States) Kyle McPhillips	3	6	[10]
(Croatia) Iva Mekovec (Egypt) Mayar Sherif	6	2	[6]
(Switzerland) Belinda Bencic (Slovakia) Natália Vajdová	6	6^{6}	[10]
(Argentina) Victoria Bosio (Argentina) Constanza Vega	3	7^{8}	[8]
(Sweden) Rebecca Peterson (Indonesia) Aldila Sutjiadi	6	6
WC	(France) Fiona Ferro (France) Harmony Tan	2	3
(Belarus) Aliaksandra Sasnovich (Croatia) Donna Vekić	7	3	[10]
3	(Romania) Ilka Csöregi (Russia) Elizaveta Kulichkova	5	6	[7]
7	(United States) Krista Hardebeck (United States) Chalena Scholl	2	2
(Kazakhstan) Anna Danilina (Russia) Victoria Kan	6	6
(New Zealand) Emily Fanning (Russia) Alina Silich	6	7^{7}
WC	(France) Lou Brouleau (France) Jade Suvrijn	4	6^{2}
(Brazil) Laura Pigossi (Mexico) Marcela Zacarías	7^{7}	3	[10]
(Czech Republic) Barbora Krejčíková (Belgium) Elise Mertens	6^{4}	6	[5]
(Canada) Erin Routliffe (Russia) Daria Salnikova	4	4
2	(Russia) Daria Gavrilova (Russia) Irina Khromacheva	6	6

Second round
5	(Germany) A Beck (United States) K McPhillips	7	6^{5}	[8]
(Switzerland) B Bencic (Slovakia) N Vajdová	5	7^{7}	[10]
(Sweden) R Peterson (Indonesia) A Sutjiadi	6	4	[6]
(Belarus) A Sasnovich (Croatia) D Vekić	3	6	[10]
(Kazakhstan) A Danilina (Russia) V Kan	6	7
(New Zealand) E Fanning (Russia) A Silich	2	5
(Brazil) L Pigossi (Mexico) M Zacarías	6^{5}	4
2	(Russia) D Gavrilova (Russia) I Khromacheva	7^{7}	6

Quarterfinals
(Switzerland) B Bencic (Slovakia) N Vajdová	4	2
(Belarus) A Sasnovich (Croatia) D Vekić	6	6
(Kazakhstan) A Danilina (Russia) V Kan	1	4
2	(Russia) D Gavrilova (Russia) I Khromacheva	6	6

Semifinals
(Belarus) A Sasnovich (Croatia) D Vekić	6	3	[7]
2	(Russia) D Gavrilova (Russia) I Khromacheva	2	6	[10]
