= 2012 French Open – Wheelchair women's singles =

Wheelchair women's singles
- 2012 French Open

Final
- Champion: (Netherlands) Esther Vergeer
- Runner-up: (Netherlands) Aniek van Koot
- Score: 6–0, 6–0

Events
Singles	men	women		boys	girls
Doubles	men	women	mixed	boys	girls
WC Singles	men	women	quad
WC Doubles	men	women	quad
Legends	−45	45+	women
- French Open

Five-time defending champion Esther Vergeer defeated Aniek van Koot in the final, 6–0, 6–0 to win the women's singles wheelchair tennis title at the 2012 French Open. Vergeer lost no sets and just three games (all in the first set of her quarterfinal against Yui Kamiji) en route to the title, improving on her record from 2010.

== Seeds ==
1. (Netherlands) Esther Vergeer (champion)
2. (Netherlands) Aniek van Koot (final)

== Draw ==
Key

- Q = Qualifier
- WC = Wild card
- LL = Lucky loser
- Alt = Alternate
- ITF = ITF entry
- PR = Protected ranking
- SR = Special ranking
- SE = Special exempt
- JE = Junior exempt
- JR = Junior Accelerator Programme entrant
- CO = College Accelerator Programme entrant
- NG = Next Gen Accelerator Program entrant
- w/o = Walkover
- r = Retired
- d = Defaulted

=== Finals ===
Quarterfinals
1	(Netherlands) Esther Vergeer	6	6
(Japan) Yui Kamiji	3	0
(Netherlands) Sharon Walraven	7^{7}	6
(Netherlands) Marjolein Buis	6^{1}	3
(Germany) Sabine Ellerbrock	0	3
(Netherlands) Jiske Griffioen	6	6
(Belgium) Annick Sevenans	0	5
2	(Netherlands) Aniek van Koot	6	7

Semifinals
1	(Netherlands) Esther Vergeer	6	6
(Netherlands) Sharon Walraven	0	0
(Netherlands) Jiske Griffioen	6	2	2
2	(Netherlands) Aniek van Koot	1	6	6

Final
1	(Netherlands) Esther Vergeer	6	6
2	(Netherlands) Aniek van Koot	0	0
