= 2012 French Open – Boys' singles =

Boys' singles
- 2012 French Open

Final
- Champion: (Belgium) Kimmer Coppejans
- Runner-up: (Canada) Filip Peliwo
- Score: 6–1, 6–4

Events
Singles	men	women		boys	girls
Doubles	men	women	mixed	boys	girls
WC Singles	men	women	quad
WC Doubles	men	women	quad
Legends	−45	45+	women
← 2011 ·	French Open	· 2013 →

Bjorn Fratangelo was the defending champion, but was not eligible to participate.
Kimmer Coppejans won this event, defeating 5th-seed Filip Peliwo 6–1, 6–4 in the final.

== Seeds ==
1. (Australia) Luke Saville (quarterfinals)
2. (Italy) Gianluigi Quinzi (third round)
3. (United Kingdom) Liam Broady (third round)
4. (Japan) Kaichi Uchida (first round)
5. (Canada) Filip Peliwo (final)
6. (Belgium) Kimmer Coppejans (champion)
7. (Serbia) Nikola Milojević (first round)
8. (United States) Mitchell Krueger (semifinals)
9. (Argentina) Mateo Nicolás Martínez (third round)
10. (United Kingdom) Joshua Ward-Hibbert (first round)
11. (Czech Republic) Adam Pavlásek (semifinals)
12. (United States) Mackenzie McDonald (first round)
13. (Australia) Andrew Harris (second round)
14. (Portugal) Frederico Ferreira Silva (second round)
15. (Italy) Stefano Napolitano (second round)
16. (Germany) Daniel Masur (first round)

== Main draw ==
=== Key ===
- Q = Qualifier
- WC = Wild card
- LL = Lucky loser
- Alt = Alternate
- SE = Special exempt
- PR = Protected ranking
- ITF = ITF entry
- JE = Junior exempt
- w/o = Walkover
- r = Retired
- d = Defaulted
- SR = Special ranking

=== Finals ===
Quarterfinals
1	(Australia) Luke Saville	3	3
11	(Czech Republic) Adam Pavlásek	6	6
(United States) Noah Rubin	4	1
5	(Canada) Filip Peliwo	6	6
8	(United States) Mitchell Krueger	6	6
(Netherlands) Max de Vroome	2	1
6	(Belgium) Kimmer Coppejans	6	6
(United Kingdom) Kyle Edmund	4	3

Semifinals
11	(Czech Republic) Adam Pavlásek	6	6^{5}	0
5	(Canada) Filip Peliwo	2	7^{7}	6
8	(United States) Mitchell Krueger	3	5
6	(Belgium) Kimmer Coppejans	6	7

Final
5	(Canada) Filip Peliwo	1	4
6	(Belgium) Kimmer Coppejans	6	6

=== Top half ===
==== Section 1 ====
First round
1	(Australia) Luke Saville	5	6	6
WC	(France) Maxime Hamou	7	4	3
(United Kingdom) Luke Bambridge	7	2	6
(Croatia) Borna Ćorić	5	6	4
WC	(France) Laurent Lokoli	4	2
Q	(Italy) Matteo Donati	6	6
Q	(Burundi) Hassan Ndayshimiye	2	3
14	(Portugal) Frederico Ferreira Silva	6	6
11	(Czech Republic) Adam Pavlásek	6	6
(Spain) Albert Alcaraz Ivorra	3	4
(France) Enzo Couacaud	5	6	5
(Argentina) Juan Ignacio Galarza	7	2	7
(United States) Spencer Papa	6	6
(Mexico) Lucas Gómez	3	4
Q	(South Korea) Chung Hyeon	6	6
7	(Serbia) Nikola Milojević	2	3

Second round
1	(Australia) L Saville	6	6
(United Kingdom) L Bambridge	0	4
Q	(Italy) M Donati	1	6	9
14	(Portugal) FF Silva	6	2	7
11	(Czech Republic) A Pavlásek	6	6
(Argentina) JI Galarza	2	2
(United States) S Papa	6	6
Q	(South Korea) H Chung	4	3

Third round
1	(Australia) L Saville	6	6
Q	(Italy) M Donati	4	3
11	(Czech Republic) A Pavlásek	6	6
(United States) S Papa	4	3

Quarterfinals
1	(Australia) L Saville	3	3
11	(Czech Republic) A Pavlásek	6	6

==== Section 2 ====
First round
3	(United Kingdom) Liam Broady	6	7
(Egypt) Karim Hossam	4	5
(Russia) Anton Desyatnik	2	3
(Belgium) Julien Cagnina	6	6
(United States) Noah Rubin	3	6	6
Q	(Peru) Jorge Brian Panta	6	1	3
WC	(France) Armel Rancezot	5	3
15	(Italy) Stefano Napolitano	7	6
12	(United States) Mackenzie McDonald	3	7	8
SE	(Australia) Jordan Thompson	6	5	10
(Brazil) Thiago Monteiro	6	6^{1}	6
WC	(France) Johan Sébastien Tatlot	3	7^{7}	4
(Japan) Yoshihito Nishioka	6	6
(Sweden) Filip Bergevi	3	3
SE	(Serbia) Laslo Djere	6	3	4
5	(Canada) Filip Peliwo	4	6	6

Second round
3	(United Kingdom) L Broady	6	6
(Belgium) J Cagnina	3	3
(United States) N Rubin	6	6
15	(Italy) S Napolitano	2	3
SE	(Australia) J Thompson	2	2
(Brazil) T Monteiro	6	6
(Japan) Y Nishioka	6^{4}	4
5	(Canada) F Peliwo	7^{7}	6

Third round
3	(United Kingdom) L Broady	2	3
(United States) N Rubin	6	6
(Brazil) T Monteiro	3	2
5	(Canada) F Peliwo	6	6

Quarterfinals
(United States) N Rubin	4	1
5	(Canada) F Peliwo	6	6

=== Bottom half ===
==== Section 3 ====
First round
8	(United States) Mitchell Krueger	6	6
Q	(Italy) Pietro Licciardi	1	3
WC	(France) Alexandre Favrot	6	7^{7}
Q	(Slovakia) Patrik Fabian	1	6^{2}
Q	(Croatia) Filip Veger	4	6	6
(Serbia) Peđa Krstin	6	3	4
WC	(France) Quentin Halys	6	6
10	(United Kingdom) Joshua Ward-Hibbert	4	1
13	(Australia) Andrew Harris	6	6
(Czech Republic) Václav Šafránek	2	2
(Netherlands) Max de Vroome	6	7
(France) Mathias Bourgue	4	5
(Spain) Eduard Esteve Lobato	6	7^{8}
(Greece) Markos Kalovelonis	4	6^{6}
(Brazil) Gabriel Friedrich	6	2	10
4	(Japan) Kaichi Uchida	3	6	8

Second round
8	(United States) M Krueger	6	6
WC	(France) A Favrot	4	2
Q	(Croatia) F Veger	3	5
WC	(France) Q Halys	6	7
13	(Australia) A Harris	3	7^{7}	5
(Netherlands) M de Vroome	6	6^{5}	7
(Spain) EE Lobato	1	6^{3}
(Brazil) G Friedrich	6	7^{7}

Third round
8	(United States) M Krueger	7^{8}	6
WC	(France) Q Halys	6^{6}	4
(Netherlands) M de Vroome	6	6
(Brazil) G Friedrich	4	3

Quarterfinals
8	(United States) M Krueger	6	6
(Netherlands) M de Vroome	2	1

==== Section 4 ====
First round
6	(Belgium) Kimmer Coppejans	3	6	6
Q	(Israel) Bar Tzuf Botzer	6	3	2
(Australia) Nick Kyrgios	6	6
(India) Arjun Kadhe	3	3
WC	(France) Grégoire Barrère	6	6
Q	(United States) Thai-Son Kwiatkowski	2	3
(Peru) Daniel Santos	0	6^{4}
9	(Argentina) Mateo Nicolás Martínez	6	7^{7}
16	(Germany) Daniel Masur	3	6^{6}
(United Kingdom) Kyle Edmund	6	7^{8}
WC	(France) Maxime Tchoutakian	6	4	6
(Denmark) Mikael Torpegaard	4	6	4
(Finland) Herkko Pöllänen	4	6	8
(Czech Republic) Robin Staněk	6	4	6
(United States) Alexios Halebian	6	6^{1}	3
2	(Italy) Gianluigi Quinzi	1	7^{7}	6

Second round
6	(Belgium) K Coppejans	6	4	7
(Australia) N Kyrgios	3	6	5
WC	(France) G Barrère	3	7^{7}	2
9	(Argentina) MN Martínez	6	6^{3}	6
(United Kingdom) K Edmund	7^{7}	6
WC	(France) M Tchoutakian	6^{5}	3
(Finland) H Pöllänen	6^{5}	4
2	(Italy) G Quinzi	7^{7}	6

Third round
6	(Belgium) K Coppejans	6	6
9	(Argentina) MN Martínez	1	3
(United Kingdom) K Edmund	7^{7}	1	6
2	(Italy) G Quinzi	6^{1}	6	4

Quarterfinals
6	(Belgium) K Coppejans	6	6
(United Kingdom) K Edmund	4	3
