= 2012 French Open – Wheelchair men's singles =

Wheelchair men's singles
- 2012 French Open

Final
- Champion: (France) Stéphane Houdet
- Runner-up: (Japan) Shingo Kunieda
- Score: 6–2, 2–6, 7–6^{(8–6)}

Events
Singles	men	women		boys	girls
Doubles	men	women	mixed	boys	girls
WC Singles	men	women	quad
WC Doubles	men	women	quad
Legends	−45	45+	women
- French Open

Stéphane Houdet defeated Shingo Kunieda in the final, 6–2, 2–6, 7–6^{(8–6)} to win the men's singles wheelchair tennis title at the 2012 French Open. It was his first French Open singles title. This was Kunieda’s first major final loss, having won his first 13 grand slam finals.

Maikel Scheffers was the defending champion, but was defeated by Kunieda in the quarterfinals.

== Seeds ==
1. (Netherlands) Maikel Scheffers (quarterfinals)
2. (France) Stéphane Houdet (champion)

== Draw ==
Key

- Q = Qualifier
- WC = Wild card
- LL = Lucky loser
- Alt = Alternate
- ITF = ITF entry
- PR = Protected ranking
- SR = Special ranking
- SE = Special exempt
- JE = Junior exempt
- JR = Junior Accelerator Programme entrant
- CO = College Accelerator Programme entrant
- NG = Next Gen Accelerator Program entrant
- w/o = Walkover
- r = Retired
- d = Defaulted

=== Finals ===
Quarterfinals
1	(Netherlands) Maikel Scheffers	2	7^{7}	4
(Japan) Shingo Kunieda	6	6^{1}	6
(France) Michaël Jérémiasz	2	6	2
(Sweden) Stefan Olsson	6	3	6
(Netherlands) Robin Ammerlaan	2	2
(Netherlands) Ronald Vink	6	6
(France) Frédéric Cattaneo	1	0
2	(France) Stéphane Houdet	6	6

Semifinals
(Japan) Shingo Kunieda	6	6
(Sweden) Stefan Olsson	0	2
(Netherlands) Ronald Vink	1	3
2	(France) Stéphane Houdet	6	6

Final
(Japan) Shingo Kunieda	2	6	6^{6}
2	(France) Stéphane Houdet	6	2	7^{8}
