= 2012 French Open – Wheelchair women's doubles =

Wheelchair women's doubles
- 2012 French Open

Final
- Champion: (Netherlands) Marjolein Buis (Netherlands) Esther Vergeer
- Runner-up: (Germany) Sabine Ellerbrock (Japan) Yui Kamiji
- Score: 6–0, 6–1

Events
Singles	men	women		boys	girls
Doubles	men	women	mixed	boys	girls
WC Singles	men	women	quad
WC Doubles	men	women	quad
Legends	−45	45+	women
- French Open

Defending champion Esther Vergeer and her partner Marjolein Buis defeated Sabine Ellerbrock and Yui Kamiji in the final, 6–0, 6–1 to win the women's doubles wheelchair tennis title at the 2012 French Open.

Vergeer and Sharon Walraven were the defending champions, but did not participate together. Walraven partnered Annick Sevenans, but was defeated in the semifinals by Ellerbrock and Kamiji.

== Seeds ==
1. (Belgium) Annick Sevenans / (Netherlands) Sharon Walraven (semifinals)
2. (Netherlands) Marjolein Buis / (Netherlands) Esther Vergeer (champions)

== Draw ==
Key

- Q = Qualifier
- WC = Wild card
- LL = Lucky loser
- Alt = Alternate
- ITF = ITF entry
- PR = Protected ranking
- SR = Special ranking
- SE = Special exempt
- JE = Junior exempt
- JR = Junior Accelerator Programme entrant
- CO = College Accelerator Programme entrant
- NG = Next Gen Accelerator Program entrant
- w/o = Walkover
- r = Retired
- d = Defaulted

=== Finals ===
Semifinals
1	(Belgium) Annick Sevenans (Netherlands) Sharon Walraven	3	2
(Germany) Sabine Ellerbrock (Japan) Yui Kamiji	6	6
(Netherlands) Jiske Griffioen (Netherlands) Aniek van Koot	3	3
2	(Netherlands) Marjolein Buis (Netherlands) Esther Vergeer	6	6

Final
(Germany) Sabine Ellerbrock (Japan) Yui Kamiji	0	1
2	(Netherlands) Marjolein Buis (Netherlands) Esther Vergeer	6	6
