= 2012 French Open – Wheelchair men's doubles =

Wheelchair men's doubles
- 2012 French Open

Final
- Champion: (France) Frédéric Cattaneo (Japan) Shingo Kunieda
- Runner-up: (France) Michael Jérémiasz (Sweden) Stefan Olsson
- Score: 3–6, 7–6^{(7–3)}, [10–6]

Events
Singles	men	women		boys	girls
Doubles	men	women	mixed	boys	girls
WC Singles	men	women	quad
WC Doubles	men	women	quad
Legends	−45	45+	women
- French Open

Two-time defending champion Shingo Kunieda and his partner Frédéric Cattaneo defeated Michael Jérémiasz and Stefan Olsson in the final, 3–6, 7–6^{(7–3)}, [10–6] to win the men's doubles wheelchair tennis title at the 2012 French Open.

Kunieda and Nicolas Peifer were the reigning champions, but Peifer withdrew due to a right-hand injury.

== Seeds ==
1. (France) Stéphane Houdet / (Netherlands) Maikel Scheffers (semifinals)
2. (Netherlands) Robin Ammerlaan / (Netherlands) Ronald Vink (semifinals)

== Draw ==
Key

- Q = Qualifier
- WC = Wild card
- LL = Lucky loser
- Alt = Alternate
- ITF = ITF entry
- PR = Protected ranking
- SR = Special ranking
- SE = Special exempt
- JE = Junior exempt
- JR = Junior Accelerator Programme entrant
- CO = College Accelerator Programme entrant
- NG = Next Gen Accelerator Program entrant
- w/o = Walkover
- r = Retired
- d = Defaulted

=== Finals ===
Semifinals
1	(France) Stéphane Houdet (Netherlands) Maikel Scheffers	6^{3}	6^{5}
(France) Michaël Jérémiasz (Sweden) Stefan Olsson	7^{7}	7^{7}
(France) Frédéric Cattaneo (Japan) Shingo Kunieda	6	6
2	(Netherlands) Robin Ammerlaan (Netherlands) Ronald Vink	2	3

Final
(France) Michaël Jérémiasz (Sweden) Stefan Olsson	6	6^{3}	[6]
(France) Frédéric Cattaneo (Japan) Shingo Kunieda	3	7^{7}	[10]
