= 2012 French Open – Legends over 45 doubles =

Legends over 45 doubles
- 2012 French Open

Final
- Champions: (United States) John McEnroe (United States) Patrick McEnroe
- Runners-up: (France) Guy Forget (France) Henri Leconte
- Score: 7–6^{(7–5)}, 6–3

Events
Singles	men	women		boys	girls
Doubles	men	women	mixed	boys	girls
WC Singles	men	women	quad
WC Doubles	men	women	quad
Legends	−45	45+	women
← 2011 ·	French Open	· 2013 →

Guy Forget and Henri Leconte were the defending champions but lost the final to John McEnroe and Patrick McEnroe, 7–6^{(7–5)}, 6–3.

== Draw ==
=== Key ===
- Q = Qualifier
- WC = Wild card
- LL = Lucky loser
- Alt = Alternate
- ITF = ITF entry
- PR = Protected ranking
- SR = Special ranking
- SE = Special exempt
- JE = Junior exempt
- JR = Junior Accelerator Programme entrant
- CO = College Accelerator Programme entrant
- NG = Next Gen Accelerator Program entrant
- w/o = Walkover
- r = Retired
- d = Defaulted

=== Final ===
Final
1	(France) Guy Forget (France) Henri Leconte	6^{5}	3
2	(United States) John McEnroe (United States) Patrick McEnroe	7^{7}	6

=== Group A ===
	(France) Forget (France) Leconte	(Australia) McNamara (Australia) Woodforde	(Iran) Bahrami (Austria) Muster	RR; W–L	Set; W–L	Game; W–L	Standings
(France) Guy Forget (France) Henri Leconte		7–5, 6–4	6–3, 6–4	2–0	4–0	25–16	1
(Australia) Peter McNamara (Australia) Mark Woodforde	5–7, 4–6		5–7, 6–2, [10–5]	1–1	3–2	21–22	2
(Iran) Mansour Bahrami (Austria) Thomas Muster	3–6, 4–6	7–5, 2–6, [5–10]		0–2	1–4	16–24	3

Standings are determined by: 1. number of wins; 2. number of matches; 3. in three-players-ties, percentage of sets won, or of games won; 4. steering-committee decision.

=== Group B ===
	(Ecuador) Gómez (Spain) Sánchez	(Sweden) Pernfors (Sweden) Wilander	(United States) McEnroe (United States) McEnroe	RR; W–L	Set; W–L	Game; W–L	Standings
(Ecuador) Andrés Gómez (Spain) Emilio Sánchez		1–6, 2–6	2–6, 2–6	0–2	0–4	7–24	3
(Sweden) Mikael Pernfors (Sweden) Mats Wilander	6–1, 6–2		7–6^{(7–5)}, 2–6, [5–10]	1–1	3–2	21–16	2
(United States) John McEnroe (United States) Patrick McEnroe	6–2, 6–2	6–7^{(5–7)}, 6–2, [10–5]		2–0	4–1	25–13	1

Standings are determined by: 1. number of wins; 2. number of matches; 3. in three-players-ties, percentage of sets won, or of games won; 4. steering-committee decision.
