= 2012 French Open – Men's doubles =

Men's doubles
- 2012 French Open

Final
- Champion: (Belarus) Max Mirnyi (Canada) Daniel Nestor
- Runner-up: (United States) Bob Bryan (United States) Mike Bryan
- Score: 6–4, 6–4

Details
- Draw: 64
- Seeds: 16

Events
Singles	men	women		boys	girls
Doubles	men	women	mixed	boys	girls
WC Singles	men	women	quad
WC Doubles	men	women	quad
Legends	−45	45+	women
← 2011 ·	French Open	· 2013 →

Max Mirnyi and Daniel Nestor were the defending champions and top seeds, and Nestor came into the event as the two-time defending champion.
They successfully defended their title by defeating Bob Bryan and Mike Bryan 6–4, 6–4 in the final.

== Seeds ==
1. (Belarus) Max Mirnyi / (Canada) Daniel Nestor (champions)
2. (United States) Bob Bryan / (United States) Mike Bryan (final)
3. (France) Michaël Llodra / (Serbia) Nenad Zimonjić (quarterfinals, retired)
4. (Poland) Mariusz Fyrstenberg / (Poland) Marcin Matkowski (third round)
5. (Sweden) Robert Lindstedt / (Romania) Horia Tecău (second round)
6. (India) Mahesh Bhupathi / (India) Rohan Bopanna (first round)
7. (India) Leander Paes / (Austria) Alexander Peya (second round)
8. (Austria) Jürgen Melzer / (Germany) Philipp Petzschner (third round)
9. (Czech Republic) František Čermák / (Slovakia) Filip Polášek (second round)
10. (Pakistan) Aisam-ul-Haq Qureshi / (Netherlands) Jean-Julien Rojer (semifinals)
11. (Mexico) Santiago González / (Germany) Christopher Kas (second round)
12. (United States) Eric Butorac / (Brazil) Bruno Soares (third round)
13. (Israel) Jonathan Erlich / (Israel) Andy Ram (second round)
14. (Italy) Daniele Bracciali / (Italy) Potito Starace (semifinals)
15. (United States) Scott Lipsky / (United States) Rajeev Ram (third round)
16. (Colombia) Juan Sebastián Cabal / (Colombia) Robert Farah Maksoud (third round)

== Draw ==
=== Key ===
- Q = Qualifier
- WC = Wild card
- LL = Lucky loser
- Alt = Alternate
- ITF = ITF entry
- PR = Protected ranking
- SR = Special ranking
- SE = Special exempt
- JE = Junior exempt
- JR = Junior Accelerator Programme entrant
- CO = College Accelerator Programme entrant
- NG = Next Gen Accelerator Program entrant
- w/o = Walkover
- r = Retired
- d = Defaulted

=== Finals ===
Quarterfinals
1	(Belarus) Max Mirnyi (Canada) Daniel Nestor	6	6
(Australia) Matthew Ebden (United States) Ryan Harrison	4	4
14	(Italy) Daniele Bracciali (Italy) Potito Starace	6	6
(Croatia) Ivan Dodig (Brazil) Marcelo Melo	2	4
10	(Pakistan) Aisam-ul-Haq Qureshi (Netherlands) Jean-Julien Rojer	6	2
3	(France) Michaël Llodra (Serbia) Nenad Zimonjić	4	1^{r}
(Austria) Oliver Marach (Argentina) Horacio Zeballos	1	6	4
2	(United States) Bob Bryan (United States) Mike Bryan	6	4	6

Semifinals
1	(Belarus) Max Mirnyi (Canada) Daniel Nestor	6	6
14	(Italy) Daniele Bracciali (Italy) Potito Starace	3	4
10	(Pakistan) Aisam-ul-Haq Qureshi (Netherlands) Jean-Julien Rojer	3	6^{6}
2	(United States) Bob Bryan (United States) Mike Bryan	6	7^{8}

Final
1	(Belarus) Max Mirnyi (Canada) Daniel Nestor	6	6
2	(United States) Bob Bryan (United States) Mike Bryan	4	4

=== Top half ===
==== Section 1 ====
First round
1	(Belarus) M Mirnyi (Canada) D Nestor	6	6
(Netherlands) R Haase (Finland) J Nieminen	3	4
WC	(France) A Clément (France) K de Schepper	3	6^{5}
(Australia) P Hanley (Australia) J Kerr	6	7^{7}
(Germany) B Becker (Poland) Ł Kubot	6	6
WC	(France) O Charroin (France) S Robert	2	2
(Australia) A Fisher (Australia) M Matosevic	5	2
15	(United States) S Lipsky (United States) R Ram	7	6
12	(United States) E Butorac (Brazil) B Soares	4	7^{7}	6
(Spain) M Granollers (Spain) A Montañés	6	6^{5}	2
(Israel) D Sela (Italy) F Volandri	6	7^{7}
Alt	(United States) JP Fruttero (South Africa) R Klaasen	3	6^{3}
(Australia) M Ebden (United States) R Harrison	7	7^{7}
(Italy) F Cipolla (Italy) A Seppi	5	6^{5}
WC	(France) M Gicquel (France) É Roger-Vasselin	1	7	6
6	(India) M Bhupathi (India) R Bopanna	6	5	3

Second round
1	(Belarus) M Mirnyi (Canada) D Nestor	6	7^{7}
(Australia) P Hanley (Australia) J Kerr	1	6^{0}
(Germany) B Becker (Poland) Ł Kubot	6	4	3
15	(United States) S Lipsky (United States) R Ram	4	6	6
12	(United States) E Butorac (Brazil) B Soares	6	6
(Israel) D Sela (Italy) F Volandri	3	2
(Australia) M Ebden (United States) R Harrison	6	6^{3}	6
WC	(France) M Gicquel (France) É Roger-Vasselin	3	7^{7}	3

Third round
1	(Belarus) M Mirnyi (Canada) D Nestor	6	6
15	(United States) S Lipsky (United States) R Ram	2	4
12	(United States) E Butorac (Brazil) B Soares	6	4	4
(Australia) M Ebden (United States) R Harrison	2	6	6

Quarterfinals
1	(Belarus) M Mirnyi (Canada) D Nestor	6	6
(Australia) M Ebden (United States) R Harrison	4	4

==== Section 2 ====
First round
4	(Poland) M Fyrstenberg (Poland) M Matkowski	6	3	7
(Spain) P Andújar (Spain) G García-López	3	6	5
(Argentina) JI Chela (Argentina) E Schwank	6	7^{7}
(Slovakia) L Lacko (Italy) P Lorenzi	3	6^{5}
(Ukraine) A Dolgopolov (Ukraine) D Molchanov	3	6	6
WC	(France) A Mannarino (France) B Paire	6	4	3
(Germany) M Emmrich (Sweden) A Siljeström	6^{4}	7^{7}	1
14	(Italy) D Bracciali (Italy) P Starace	7^{7}	6^{2}	6
9	(Czech Republic) F Čermák (Slovakia) F Polášek	7^{7}	7
(Colombia) A Falla (Colombia) S Giraldo	6^{1}	5
(Croatia) I Dodig (Brazil) M Melo	6	6
(Germany) C-M Stebe (Australia) B Tomic	3	4
(Kazakhstan) M Kukushkin (Russia) I Kunitsyn	3	2
(Argentina) C Berlocq (Spain) D Marrero	6	6
(Austria) J Knowle (Argentina) L Mayer	3	4
8	(Austria) J Melzer (Germany) P Petzschner	6	6

Second round
4	(Poland) M Fyrstenberg (Poland) M Matkowski	7^{7}	6
(Argentina) JI Chela (Argentina) E Schwank	6^{4}	4
(Ukraine) A Dolgopolov (Ukraine) D Molchanov	1	7^{8}	4
14	(Italy) D Bracciali (Italy) P Starace	6	6^{6}	6
9	(Czech Republic) F Čermák (Slovakia) F Polášek	7	3	6^{4}
(Croatia) I Dodig (Brazil) M Melo	5	6	7^{7}
(Argentina) C Berlocq (Spain) D Marrero	3	6^{7}
8	(Austria) J Melzer (Germany) P Petzschner	6	7^{9}

Third round
4	(Poland) M Fyrstenberg (Poland) M Matkowski	6^{4}	3
14	(Italy) D Bracciali (Italy) P Starace	7^{7}	6
(Croatia) I Dodig (Brazil) M Melo	6	6
8	(Austria) J Melzer (Germany) P Petzschner	3	1

Quarterfinals
14	(Italy) D Bracciali (Italy) P Starace	6	6
(Croatia) I Dodig (Brazil) M Melo	2	4

=== Bottom half ===
==== Section 3 ====
First round
5	(Sweden) R Lindstedt (Romania) H Tecău	6	6
(Russia) A Bogomolov Jr. (Belgium) D Norman	4	2
(United States) M Russell (United States) D Young	5	2
(Philippines) TC Huey (United Kingdom) D Inglot	7	6
(Germany) B Phau (Canada) A Shamasdin	3	7	6
WC	(France) P-H Herbert (France) A Olivetti	6	5	1
WC	(France) J Dasnières de Veigy (France) N Renavand	3	2
10	(Pakistan) A-u-H Qureshi (Netherlands) J-J Rojer	6	6
16	(Colombia) JS Cabal (Colombia) R Farah	6	7^{7}
(Germany) D Brown (United Kingdom) J Marray	4	6^{4}
(United States) J Cerretani (Romania) V Hănescu	7^{7}	6^{9}	6
(France) J Chardy (Bulgaria) G Dimitrov	6^{5}	7^{11}	3
(Australia) C Ball (United Kingdom) J Murray	6^{5}	6	3
(Chinese Taipei) Y-H Lu (Japan) G Soeda	7^{7}	4	6
(Spain) R Ramírez Hidalgo (Spain) A Ramos	1	1
3	(France) M Llodra (Serbia) N Zimonjić	6	6

Second round
5	(Sweden) R Lindstedt (Romania) H Tecău	3	4
(Philippines) TC Huey (United Kingdom) D Inglot	6	6
(Germany) B Phau (Canada) A Shamasdin	3	6	6^{4}
10	(Pakistan) A-u-H Qureshi (Netherlands) J-J Rojer	6	3	7^{7}
16	(Colombia) JS Cabal (Colombia) R Farah	6	6
(United States) J Cerretani (Romania) V Hănescu	4	3
(Chinese Taipei) Y-H Lu (Japan) G Soeda	3	3
3	(France) M Llodra (Serbia) N Zimonjić	6	6

Third round
(Philippines) TC Huey (United Kingdom) D Inglot	1	4
10	(Pakistan) A-u-H Qureshi (Netherlands) J-J Rojer	6	6
16	(Colombia) JS Cabal (Colombia) R Farah	6^{6}	6	4
3	(France) M Llodra (Serbia) N Zimonjić	7^{8}	4	6

Quarterfinals
10	(Pakistan) A-u-H Qureshi (Netherlands) J-J Rojer	6	2
3	(France) M Llodra (Serbia) N Zimonjić	4	1	r

==== Section 4 ====
First round
7	(India) L Paes (Austria) A Peya	6	6^{2}	6
(Italy) S Bolelli (Italy) F Fognini	1	7^{7}	3
(Russia) M Elgin (Uzbekistan) D Istomin	3	6	7^{7}
(Belgium) S Darcis (Belgium) O Rochus	6	3	6^{0}
(Germany) M Kohlmann (Germany) A Waske	6	6^{5}	4
(Austria) O Marach (Argentina) H Zeballos	3	7^{7}	6
(Germany) M Bachinger (Germany) F Moser	2	6^{7}
11	(Mexico) S González (Germany) C Kas	6	7^{9}
13	(Israel) J Erlich (Israel) A Ram	6^{2}	6	7^{8}
(Sweden) J Brunström (Germany) P Marx	7^{7}	2	6^{6}
(The Bahamas) M Knowles (Belgium) X Malisse	6	6
(Slovakia) M Mertiňák (Brazil) A Sá	3	6	r
(Czech Republic) L Dlouhý (France) N Mahut	6	7
(Spain) D Gimeno-Traver (Portugal) R Machado	1	5
(Ukraine) S Stakhovsky (Russia) M Youzhny	5	3
2	(United States) B Bryan (United States) M Bryan	7	6

Second round
7	(India) L Paes (Austria) A Peya	4	1
(Russia) M Elgin (Uzbekistan) D Istomin	6	6
(Austria) O Marach (Argentina) H Zeballos	6^{4}	6	6
11	(Mexico) S González (Germany) C Kas	7^{7}	2	1
13	(Israel) J Erlich (Israel) A Ram	6^{4}	3
(The Bahamas) M Knowles (Belgium) X Malisse	7^{7}	6
(Czech Republic) L Dlouhý (France) N Mahut	0	2
2	(United States) B Bryan (United States) M Bryan	6	6

Third round
(Russia) M Elgin (Uzbekistan) D Istomin	3	4
(Austria) O Marach (Argentina) H Zeballos	6	6
(The Bahamas) M Knowles (Belgium) X Malisse	3	2
2	(United States) B Bryan (United States) M Bryan	6	6

Quarterfinals
(Austria) O Marach (Argentina) H Zeballos	1	6	4
2	(United States) B Bryan (United States) M Bryan	6	4	6
