= 2012 French Open – Women's legends doubles =

Women's legends doubles
- 2012 French Open

Final
- Champions: (United States) Lindsay Davenport (Switzerland) Martina Hingis
- Runners-up: (United States) Martina Navratilova (Czech Republic) Jana Novotná
- Score: 6–4, 6–4

Events
Singles	men	women		boys	girls
Doubles	men	women	mixed	boys	girls
WC Singles	men	women	quad
WC Doubles	men	women	quad
Legends	−45	45+	women
← 2011 ·	French Open	· 2013 →

Lindsay Davenport and Martina Hingis were the defending champions and defended their title, defeating Martina Navratilova and Jana Novotná in the final, 6–4, 6–4.

== Draw ==
=== Key ===
- Q = Qualifier
- WC = Wild card
- LL = Lucky loser
- Alt = Alternate
- ITF = ITF entry
- PR = Protected ranking
- SR = Special ranking
- SE = Special exempt
- JE = Junior exempt
- JR = Junior Accelerator Programme entrant
- CO = College Accelerator Programme entrant
- NG = Next Gen Accelerator Program entrant
- w/o = Walkover
- r = Retired
- d = Defaulted

=== Final ===
Final
1	(United States) Martina Navratilova (Czech Republic) Jana Novotná	4	4
2	(United States) Lindsay Davenport (Switzerland) Martina Hingis	6	6

=== Group A ===
	(United States) Navratilova (Czech Republic) Novotná	(France) Tauziat (France) Testud	(United States) Fernández (Belarus) Zvereva	RR; W–L	Set; W–L	Game; W–L	Standings
(United States) Martina Navratilova (Czech Republic) Jana Novotná		6–3, 2–6, [10–7]	6–2, 6–2	2–0	4–1	21–13	1
(France) Nathalie Tauziat (France) Sandrine Testud	3–6, 6–2, [7–10]		7–5, 3–6, [10–7]	1–1	3–3	20–20	2
(United States) Gigi Fernández (Belarus) Natasha Zvereva	2–6, 2–6	5–7, 6–3, [7–10]		0–2	1–4	15–23	3

Standings are determined by: 1. number of wins; 2. number of matches; 3. in three-players-ties, percentage of sets won, or of games won; 4. steering-committee decision.

=== Group B ===
	(Croatia) Majoli (Spain) Martínez	(Germany) Huber (Austria) Schett	(United States) Davenport (Switzerland) Hingis	RR; W–L	Set; W–L	Game; W–L	Standings
(Croatia) Iva Majoli (Spain) Conchita Martínez		1–6, 6–3, [7–10]	1–6, 4–6	0–2	1–4	13–22	3
(Germany) Anke Huber (Austria) Barbara Schett	6–1, 3–6, [10–7]		4–6, 3–6	1–1	2–3	17–20	2
(United States) Lindsay Davenport (Switzerland) Martina Hingis	6–1, 6–4	6–4, 6–3		2–0	4–0	24–12	1

Standings are determined by: 1. number of wins; 2. number of matches; 3. in three-players-ties, percentage of sets won, or of games won; 4. steering-committee decision.
