= 2012 French Open – Legends under 45 doubles =

Legends under 45 doubles
- 2012 French Open

Final
- Champions: (Spain) Albert Costa (Spain) Carlos Moyá
- Runners-up: (Sweden) Thomas Enqvist (Australia) Todd Woodbridge
- Score: 6–2, 6–1

Events
Singles	men	women		boys	girls
Doubles	men	women	mixed	boys	girls
WC Singles	men	women	quad
WC Doubles	men	women	quad
Legends	−45	45+	women
← 2011 ·	French Open	· 2013 →

Fabrice Santoro and Todd Woodbridge were the defending champions, but they decided not to participate together.
Santoro played alongside Cédric Pioline, while Woodbridge partnered up with Thomas Enqvist.
Albert Costa and Carlos Moyá won the event beating Enqvist and Woodbridge in the final, 6–2, 6–1

== Draw ==
=== Key ===
- Q = Qualifier
- WC = Wild card
- LL = Lucky loser
- Alt = Alternate
- ITF = ITF entry
- PR = Protected ranking
- SR = Special ranking
- SE = Special exempt
- JE = Junior exempt
- JR = Junior Accelerator Programme entrant
- CO = College Accelerator Programme entrant
- NG = Next Gen Accelerator Program entrant
- w/o = Walkover
- r = Retired
- d = Defaulted

=== Final ===
Final
1	(Sweden) Thomas Enqvist (Australia) Todd Woodbridge	2	1
2	(Spain) Albert Costa (Spain) Carlos Moyá	6	6

=== Group A ===
	(Croatia) Ivanišević (Germany) Stich	(Spain) Bruguera (Netherlands) Krajicek	(Sweden) Enqvist (Australia) Woodbridge	RR; W–L	Set; W–L	Game; W–L	Standings
(Croatia) Goran Ivanišević (Germany) Michael Stich		3–6, 4–6	6–3, 2–6. [12–14]	0–2	1–4	15–22	3
(Spain) Sergi Bruguera (Netherlands) Richard Krajicek	6–3, 6–4		6–3, 3–6, [5–10]	1–1	3–2	21–17	2
(Sweden) Thomas Enqvist (Australia) Todd Woodbridge	3–6, 6–2, [14–12]	3–6, 6–3, [10–5]		2–0	4–2	20–17	1

Standings are determined by: 1. number of wins; 2. number of matches; 3. in three-players-ties, percentage of sets won, or of games won; 4. steering-committee decision.

=== Group B ===
	(Russia) Kafelnikov (Ukraine) Medvedev	(France) Pioline (France) Santoro	(Spain) Costa (Spain) Moyá	RR; W–L	Set; W–L	Game; W–L	Standings
(Russia) Yevgeny Kafelnikov (Ukraine) Andriy Medvedev		5–7, 6–4, [5–10]	1–6, 6–4, [6–10]	0–2	2–4	18–23	3
(France) Cédric Pioline (France) Fabrice Santoro	7–5, 6–4, [10–5]		6–7^{(1–7)}, 6–3, [5–10]	1–1	3–3	23–22	2
(Spain) Albert Costa (Spain) Carlos Moyá	6–1, 4–6, [10–6]	7–6^{(7–1)}, 3–6, [10–5]		2–0	4–2	22–19	1

Standings are determined by: 1. number of wins; 2. number of matches; 3. in three-players-ties, percentage of sets won, or of games won; 4. steering-committee decision.
