= 2012 French Open – Women's doubles =

Women's doubles
- 2012 French Open

Final
- Champion: (Italy) Sara Errani (Italy) Roberta Vinci
- Runner-up: (Russia) Maria Kirilenko (Russia) Nadia Petrova
- Score: 4–6, 6–4, 6–2

Details
- Draw: 64 (7 WC )
- Seeds: 16

Events
Singles	men	women		boys	girls
Doubles	men	women	mixed	boys	girls
WC Singles	men	women	quad
WC Doubles	men	women	quad
Legends	−45	45+	women
← 2011 ·	French Open	· 2013 →

Andrea Hlaváčková and Lucie Hradecká were the defending champions, but lost in the semifinals to Maria Kirilenko and Nadia Petrova.

Sara Errani and Roberta Vinci won the tournament, defeating Kirilenko and Petrova in the final 4–6, 6–4, 6–2.

== Seeds ==
1. (United States) Liezel Huber / (United States) Lisa Raymond (first round)
2. (Czech Republic) Květa Peschke / (Slovenia) Katarina Srebotnik (quarterfinals)
3. (United States) Vania King / (Kazakhstan) Yaroslava Shvedova (quarterfinals)
4. (Italy) Sara Errani / (Italy) Roberta Vinci (champions)
5. (Czech Republic) Andrea Hlaváčková / (Czech Republic) Lucie Hradecká (semifinals)
6. (Russia) Ekaterina Makarova / (Russia) Elena Vesnina (quarterfinals)
7. (Russia) Maria Kirilenko / (Russia) Nadia Petrova (final)
8. (Czech Republic) Iveta Benešová / (Czech Republic) Barbora Záhlavová-Strýcová (first round)
9. (South Africa) Natalie Grandin / (Czech Republic) Vladimíra Uhlířová (second round)
10. (United States) Raquel Kops-Jones / (United States) Abigail Spears (second round)
11. (Spain) Anabel Medina Garrigues / (Spain) Arantxa Parra Santonja (third round)
12. (Spain) Nuria Llagostera Vives / (Spain) María José Martínez Sánchez (semifinals)
13. (Russia) Svetlana Kuznetsova / (Russia) Vera Zvonareva (withdrew)
14. (Australia) Jarmila Gajdošová / (Australia) Anastasia Rodionova (quarterfinals)
15. (United States) Bethanie Mattek-Sands / (India) Sania Mirza (first round)
16. (New Zealand) Marina Erakovic / (Romania) Monica Niculescu (second round)
17. (Argentina) Gisela Dulko / (Argentina) Paola Suárez (second round)

== Draw ==
=== Key ===
- Q = Qualifier
- WC = Wild card
- LL = Lucky loser
- Alt = Alternate
- ITF = ITF entry
- PR = Protected ranking
- SR = Special ranking
- SE = Special exempt
- JE = Junior exempt
- JR = Junior Accelerator Programme entrant
- CO = College Accelerator Programme entrant
- NG = Next Gen Accelerator Program entrant
- w/o = Walkover
- r = Retired
- d = Defaulted

=== Finals ===
Quarterfinals
14	(Australia) Jarmila Gajdošová (Australia) Anastasia Rodionova	2	3
12	(Spain) Nuria Llagostera Vives (Spain) María José Martínez Sánchez	6	6
4	(Italy) Sara Errani (Italy) Roberta Vinci	6	5	6
6	(Russia) Ekaterina Makarova (Russia) Elena Vesnina	4	7	4
7	(Russia) Maria Kirilenko (Russia) Nadia Petrova	6	6
3	(United States) Vania King (Kazakhstan) Yaroslava Shvedova	3	4
5	(Czech Republic) Andrea Hlaváčková (Czech Republic) Lucie Hradecká	6	5	7^{7}
2	(Czech Republic) Květa Peschke (Slovenia) Katarina Srebotnik	1	7	6^{4}

Semifinals
12	(Spain) Nuria Llagostera Vives (Spain) María José Martínez Sánchez	4	2
4	(Italy) Sara Errani (Italy) Roberta Vinci	6	6
7	(Russia) Maria Kirilenko (Russia) Nadia Petrova	4	7	7
5	(Czech Republic) Andrea Hlaváčková (Czech Republic) Lucie Hradecká	6	5	5

Final
4	(Italy) Sara Errani (Italy) Roberta Vinci	4	6	6
7	(Russia) Maria Kirilenko (Russia) Nadia Petrova	6	4	2

=== Top half ===
==== Section 1 ====
First round
1	(United States) L Huber (United States) L Raymond	3	5
(Estonia) K Kanepi (China) S Zhang	6	7
WC	(France) I Pavlovic (France) A Rezaï	6	1	2
(France) S Foretz Gacon (France) K Mladenovic	1	6	6
(Australia) C Dellacqua (Russia) A Panova	6	6
(Czech Republic) E Birnerová (Czech Republic) P Cetkovská	4	4
(Romania) I-C Begu (Israel) S Pe'er	2	1
14	(Australia) J Gajdošová (Australia) A Rodionova	6	6
12	(Spain) N Llagostera Vives (Spain) MJ Martínez Sánchez	1	6	6
(Poland) K Jans-Ignacik (Russia) A Kudryavtseva	6	2	3
(Slovakia) J Husárová (United States) C McHale	6	6
(Russia) A Pavlyuchenkova (Czech Republic) L Šafářová	4	4
(Italy) F Pennetta (Italy) F Schiavone	6	2
(Romania) S Cîrstea (Japan) A Morita	2	0^{r}
(Germany) A Kerber (Poland) A Radwańska	7^{7}	7
8	(Czech Republic) I Benešová (Czech Republic) B Záhlavová-Strýcová	6^{4}	5

Second round
(Estonia) K Kanepi (China) S Zhang	6	6
(France) S Foretz Gacon (France) K Mladenovic	4	3
(Australia) C Dellacqua (Russia) A Panova	6	4	1
14	(Australia) J Gajdošová (Australia) A Rodionova	3	6	6
12	(Spain) N Llagostera Vives (Spain) MJ Martínez Sánchez	7	6^{3}	7
(Slovakia) J Husárová (United States) C McHale	5	7^{7}	5
(Italy) F Pennetta (Italy) F Schiavone	3	6	6
(Germany) A Kerber (Poland) A Radwańska	6	4	2

Third round
(Estonia) K Kanepi (China) S Zhang	4	5
14	(Australia) J Gajdošová (Australia) A Rodionova	6	7
12	(Spain) N Llagostera Vives (Spain) MJ Martínez Sánchez	6	2	6
(Italy) F Pennetta (Italy) F Schiavone	3	6	2

Quarterfinals
14	(Australia) J Gajdošová (Australia) A Rodionova	2	3
12	(Spain) N Llagostera Vives (Spain) MJ Martínez Sánchez	6	6

==== Section 2 ====
First round
4	(Italy) S Errani (Italy) R Vinci	6	6
(Italy) A Brianti (Austria) P Mayr-Achleitner	1	3
(Hungary) T Babos (Chinese Taipei) S-w Hsieh	6	6
WC	(France) A Cornet (France) V Razzano	3	1
WC	(France) C Garcia (France) M Johansson	6	4	1
(Greece) E Daniilidou (Luxembourg) M Minella	0	6	6
Alt	(Russia) N Bratchikova (Romania) E Gallovits-Hall	6	4	7
15	(United States) B Mattek-Sands (India) S Mirza	3	6	5
9	(South Africa) N Grandin (Czech Republic) V Uhlířová	6	7^{7}
(Sweden) S Arvidsson (Sweden) J Larsson	3	6^{4}
(Chinese Taipei) H-c Chan (Chinese Taipei) Y-j Chan	6	6
Alt	(Netherlands) K Bertens (Hungary) K Marosi	3	2
(Slovakia) D Cibulková (China) S Zheng	6	4	6
WC	(France) C Feuerstein (France) V Larrière	3	6	2
(Germany) J Görges (Australia) S Stosur	4	2
6	(Russia) E Makarova (Russia) E Vesnina	6	6

Second round
4	(Italy) S Errani (Italy) R Vinci	6	6
(Hungary) T Babos (Chinese Taipei) S-w Hsieh	4	2
(Greece) E Daniilidou (Luxembourg) M Minella	3	2
Alt	(Russia) N Bratchikova (Romania) E Gallovits-Hall	6	6
9	(South Africa) N Grandin (Czech Republic) V Uhlířová	2	4
(Chinese Taipei) H-c Chan (Chinese Taipei) Y-j Chan	6	6
(Slovakia) D Cibulková (China) S Zheng	4	2
6	(Russia) E Makarova (Russia) E Vesnina	6	6

Third round
4	(Italy) S Errani (Italy) R Vinci	6	6
Alt	(Russia) N Bratchikova (Romania) E Gallovits-Hall	4	2
(Chinese Taipei) H-c Chan (Chinese Taipei) Y-j Chan	3	4
6	(Russia) E Makarova (Russia) E Vesnina	6	6

Quarterfinals
4	(Italy) S Errani (Italy) R Vinci	6	5	6
6	(Russia) E Makarova (Russia) E Vesnina	4	7	4

=== Bottom half ===
==== Section 3 ====
First round
7	(Russia) M Kirilenko (Russia) N Petrova	6	6
(Spain) L Domínguez Lino (Switzerland) R Oprandi	2	1
(Uzbekistan) A Amanmuradova (Ukraine) K Bondarenko	7^{7}	5	6
(Spain) C Suárez Navarro (Belarus) A Yakimova	6^{2}	7	3
(Chinese Taipei) C-j Chuang (Russia) V Dushevina	4
(Slovenia) P Hercog (Poland) U Radwańska	1	r
WC	(France) I Brémond (France) S Lefèvre	1	2
11	(Spain) A Medina Garrigues (Spain) A Parra Santonja	6	6
16	(New Zealand) M Erakovic (Romania) M Niculescu	7	6
WC	(France) S Beltrame (France) L Thorpe	5	4
(China) S Peng (China) J Zheng	6	6
(Germany) M Barthel (United States) V Lepchenko	4	1
(Romania) S Halep (Canada) A Wozniak	6	6
(Romania) A Cadanțu (United Kingdom) A Keothavong	2	3
(Austria) T Paszek (Germany) J Wöhr	4	3
3	(United States) V King (Kazakhstan) Y Shvedova	6	6

Second round
7	(Russia) M Kirilenko (Russia) N Petrova	6	6
(Uzbekistan) A Amanmuradova (Ukraine) K Bondarenko	4	2
(Chinese Taipei) C-j Chuang (Russia) V Dushevina	6	3	4
11	(Spain) A Medina Garrigues (Spain) A Parra Santonja	1	6	6
16	(New Zealand) M Erakovic (Romania) M Niculescu	2	1
(China) S Peng (China) J Zheng	6	6
(Romania) S Halep (Canada) A Wozniak
3	(United States) V King (Kazakhstan) Y Shvedova	w/o

Third round
7	(Russia) M Kirilenko (Russia) N Petrova	7	7^{7}
11	(Spain) A Medina Garrigues (Spain) A Parra Santonja	5	6^{4}
(China) S Peng (China) J Zheng	4	2
3	(United States) V King (Kazakhstan) Y Shvedova	6	6

Quarterfinals
7	(Russia) M Kirilenko (Russia) N Petrova	6	6
3	(United States) V King (Kazakhstan) Y Shvedova	3	4

==== Section 4 ====
First round
5	(Czech Republic) A Hlaváčková (Czech Republic) L Hradecká	6	6
WC	(France) J Coin (France) P Parmentier	0	1
(Hungary) G Arn (Bulgaria) T Pironkova	2	4
(Germany) A-L Grönefeld (Croatia) P Martić	6	6
(United States) S Stephens (Belgium) Y Wickmayer	7	5	4
(Latvia) L Dekmeijere (Thailand) T Tanasugarn	5	7	6
(Slovenia) A Klepač (Poland) A Rosolska	3	4
10	(United States) R Kops-Jones (United States) A Spears	6	6
17	(Argentina) G Dulko (Argentina) P Suárez	6	7^{7}
(Belarus) D Kustova (Georgia (country)) A Tatishvili	2	6^{4}
(Czech Republic) R Voráčová (Czech Republic) K Zakopalová	6	2	6
(Japan) K Date-Krumm (Japan) R Fujiwara	4	6	3
(Kazakhstan) K Pervak (Ukraine) L Tsurenko	2	3
(Belarus) O Govortsova (Kazakhstan) G Voskoboeva	6	6
(Germany) K Barrois (Croatia) D Jurak	2	5
2	(Czech Republic) K Peschke (Slovenia) K Srebotnik	6	7

Second round
5	(Czech Republic) A Hlaváčková (Czech Republic) L Hradecká	6	6
(Germany) A-L Grönefeld (Croatia) P Martić	4	3
(Latvia) L Dekmeijere (Thailand) T Tanasugarn	6	6
10	(United States) R Kops-Jones (United States) A Spears	4	4
17	(Argentina) G Dulko (Argentina) P Suárez	4	4
(Czech Republic) R Voráčová (Czech Republic) K Zakopalová	6	6
(Belarus) O Govortsova (Kazakhstan) G Voskoboeva	5	1
2	(Czech Republic) K Peschke (Slovenia) K Srebotnik	7	6

Third round
5	(Czech Republic) A Hlaváčková (Czech Republic) L Hradecká	6	6
(Latvia) L Dekmeijere (Thailand) T Tanasugarn	2	4
(Czech Republic) R Voráčová (Czech Republic) K Zakopalová	0	2
2	(Czech Republic) K Peschke (Slovenia) K Srebotnik	6	6

Quarterfinals
5	(Czech Republic) A Hlaváčková (Czech Republic) L Hradecká	6	5	7^{7}
2	(Czech Republic) K Peschke (Slovenia) K Srebotnik	1	7	6^{4}
