= 2012 French Open – Mixed doubles =

Mixed doubles
- 2012 French Open

Final
- Champions: (India) Sania Mirza (India) Mahesh Bhupathi
- Runners-up: (Poland) Klaudia Jans-Ignacik (Mexico) Santiago González
- Score: 7–6^{(7–3)}, 6–1

Details
- Draw: 32
- Seeds: 8

Events
Singles	men	women		boys	girls
Doubles	men	women	mixed	boys	girls
WC Singles	men	women	quad
WC Doubles	men	women	quad
Legends	−45	45+	women
- French Open

Casey Dellacqua and Scott Lipsky were the defending champions. Dellacqua chose not to participate this year while Lipsky partnered with Vladimíra Uhlířová, but they were defeated in the first round by Virginie Razzano and Nicolas Devilder.
Sania Mirza and Mahesh Bhupathi won the tournament defeating Klaudia Jans-Ignacik of Poland and Santiago González of Mexico 7–6^{(7–3)}, 6–1 in the final.

== Seeds ==
1. (United States) Liezel Huber / (Belarus) Max Mirnyi (quarterfinals)
2. (Czech Republic) Květa Peschke / (United States) Mike Bryan (quarterfinals)
3. (Slovenia) Katarina Srebotnik / (Serbia) Nenad Zimonjić (second round)
4. (United States) Lisa Raymond / (India) Rohan Bopanna (first round)
5. (Russia) Elena Vesnina / (India) Leander Paes (semifinals)
6. (Russia) Nadia Petrova / (Canada) Daniel Nestor (first round)
7. (India) Sania Mirza / (India) Mahesh Bhupathi (champions)
8. (Czech Republic) Andrea Hlaváčková / (Pakistan) Aisam-ul-Haq Qureshi (first round)

== Draw ==
Key

- Q = Qualifier
- WC = Wild card
- LL = Lucky loser
- Alt = Alternate
- ITF = ITF entry
- PR = Protected ranking
- SR = Special ranking
- SE = Special exempt
- JE = Junior exempt
- JR = Junior Accelerator Programme entrant
- CO = College Accelerator Programme entrant
- NG = Next Gen Accelerator Program entrant
- w/o = Walkover
- r = Retired
- d = Defaulted

=== Finals ===
Semifinals
5	(Russia) Elena Vesnina (India) Leander Paes	6^{2}	3
Alt	(Poland) Klaudia Jans-Ignacik (Mexico) Santiago González	7^{7}	6
(Kazakhstan) Galina Voskoboeva (Italy) Daniele Bracciali	4	2
7	(India) Sania Mirza (India) Mahesh Bhupathi	6	6

Final
Alt	(Poland) Klaudia Jans-Ignacik (Mexico) Santiago González	6^{3}	1
7	(India) Sania Mirza (India) Mahesh Bhupathi	7^{7}	6

=== Top half ===
First round
1	(United States) L Huber (Belarus) M Mirnyi	6	7
(Russia) V Dushevina (Colombia) JS Cabal	2	5
(Poland) A Rosolska (Austria) A Peya	3	7^{8}	[10]
Alt	(Australia) J Gajdošová (Brazil) B Soares	6	6^{6}	[8]
(United States) A Spears (Poland) M Fyrstenberg	5	3
WC	(France) M Johansson (France) M Gicquel	7	6
(Czech Republic) L Hradecká (Czech Republic) F Čermák	1	1
5	(Russia) E Vesnina (India) L Paes	6	6
4	(United States) L Raymond (India) R Bopanna	6^{6}	6	[6]
(South Africa) N Grandin (Australia) P Hanley	7^{8}	4	[10]
(Russia) A Kudryavtseva (Slovakia) F Polášek	3	4
WC	(France) S Foretz Gacon (France) É Roger-Vasselin	6	6
WC	(France) J Coin (France) N Mahut	4	1
(Germany) A-L Grönefeld (Poland) M Matkowski	6	6
Alt	(Poland) K Jans-Ignacik (Mexico) S González	3	6	[10]
6	(Russia) N Petrova (Canada) D Nestor	6	3	[8]

Second round
1	(United States) L Huber (Belarus) M Mirnyi	6	7^{7}
(Poland) A Rosolska (Austria) A Peya	1	6^{3}
WC	(France) M Johansson (France) M Gicquel	2	0
5	(Russia) E Vesnina (India) L Paes	6	6
(South Africa) N Grandin (Australia) P Hanley	6	6
WC	(France) S Foretz Gacon (France) É Roger-Vasselin	2	4
(Germany) A-L Grönefeld (Poland) M Matkowski	4	4
Alt	(Poland) K Jans-Ignacik (Mexico) S González	6	6

Quarterfinals
1	(United States) L Huber (Belarus) M Mirnyi	6	5	[5]
5	(Russia) E Vesnina (India) L Paes	4	7	[10]
(South Africa) N Grandin (Australia) P Hanley	4	6	[5]
Alt	(Poland) K Jans-Ignacik (Mexico) S González	6	3	[10]

Semifinals
5	(Russia) E Vesnina (India) L Paes	6^{2}	3
Alt	(Poland) K Jans-Ignacik (Mexico) S González	7^{7}	6

=== Bottom half ===
First round
8	(Czech Republic) A Hlaváčková (Pakistan) A-u-H Qureshi	4	2
(Kazakhstan) G Voskoboeva (Italy) D Bracciali	6	6
(United States) S Williams (United States) B Bryan	5	6	[6]
(Argentina) G Dulko (Argentina) E Schwank	7	3	[10]
WC	(France) A Hesse (France) M Llodra	6^{4}	6	[3]
(Spain) N Llagostera Vives (Austria) O Marach	7^{7}	2	[10]
(Australia) A Rodionova (Germany) C Kas	3	3
3	(Slovenia) K Srebotnik (Serbia) N Zimonjić	6	6
7	(India) S Mirza (India) M Bhupathi	6	6
(United States) R Kops-Jones (United States) E Butorac	2	4
WC	(France) V Razzano (France) N Devilder	3	7	[10]
(Czech Republic) V Uhlířová (United States) S Lipsky	6	5	[6]
(Kazakhstan) Y Shvedova (Spain) D Marrero	5	1
(United States) B Mattek-Sands (Romania) H Tecău	7	6
WC	(France) P Parmentier (France) B Paire	4	1
2	(Czech Republic) K Peschke (United States) M Bryan	6	6

Second round
(Kazakhstan) G Voskoboeva (Italy) D Bracciali	6	7
(Argentina) G Dulko (Argentina) E Schwank	4	5
(Spain) N Llagostera Vives (Austria) O Marach	6	7
3	(Slovenia) K Srebotnik (Serbia) N Zimonjić	2	5
7	(India) S Mirza (India) M Bhupathi	7^{7}	6
WC	(France) V Razzano (France) N Devilder	6^{4}	3
(United States) B Mattek-Sands (Romania) H Tecău	3^{r}
2	(Czech Republic) K Peschke (United States) M Bryan	5

Quarterfinals
(Kazakhstan) G Voskoboeva (Italy) D Bracciali	6	6
(Spain) N Llagostera Vives (Austria) O Marach	1	2
7	(India) S Mirza (India) M Bhupathi	6	6
2	(Czech Republic) K Peschke (United States) M Bryan	2	3

Semifinals
(Kazakhstan) G Voskoboeva (Italy) D Bracciali	4	2
7	(India) S Mirza (India) M Bhupathi	6	6
