= 2018 BNP Paribas de Nouvelle-Calédonie – Doubles =

Doubles
- 2018 BNP Paribas de Nouvelle-Calédonie

Final
- Champions: (France) Hugo Nys (Germany) Tim Pütz
- Runners-up: (Colombia) Alejandro González (Spain) Jaume Munar
- Score: 6–2, 6–2

Events
| Singles | Doubles |
| ← 2017 · | BNP Paribas de Nouvelle-Calédonie | · 2019 → |

Quentin Halys and Tristan Lamasine were the defending champions but chose not to defend their title.

Hugo Nys and Tim Pütz won the title after defeating Alejandro González and Jaume Munar in the final 6–2, 6–2.

== Seeds ==
1. (France) Hugo Nys / (Germany) Tim Pütz (champions)
2. (United States) Bradley Klahn / (United States) Jackson Withrow (semifinals)
3. (United States) Nathaniel Lammons / (United States) Alex Lawson (first round)
4. (United States) Mitchell Krueger / (United States) Dennis Novikov (first round)

== Draw ==
=== Key ===
- Q = Qualifier
- WC = Wild card
- LL = Lucky loser
- Alt = Alternate
- SE = Special exempt
- PR = Protected ranking
- ITF = ITF entry
- JE = Junior exempt
- w/o = Walkover
- r = Retired
- d = Defaulted
- SR = Special ranking

First round
1 | (France) H Nys (Germany) T Pütz | 7^{7} | 7
(United States) T Fritz (Norway) C Ruud | 6^{0} | 5
(United Kingdom) C Norrie (New Zealand) R Statham | 2 | 6 | [10]
(France) K de Schepper (United States) N Rubin | 6 | 3 | [5]
3 | (United States) N Lammons (United States) A Lawson | 7 | 6^{4} | [4]
PR | (Poland) H Hurkacz (Poland) M Przysiężny | 5 | 7^{7} | [10]
WC | (Switzerland) Loïc Perret (France) S Robert | 5 | 6 | [7]
(Italy) S Caruso (Italy) F Gaio | 7 | 4 | [10]
(France) M Bourgue (France) C Moutet | 1 | 7^{7} | [5]
(France) V Millot (France) G Sakharov | 6 | 6^{1} | [10]
PR | (Colombia) A González (Spain) J Munar | 6 | 6^{3} | [10]
4 | (United States) M Krueger (United States) D Novikov | 2 | 7^{7} | [6]
WC | (France) E Benchetrit (France) G Blancaneaux | 6 | 6
WC | (France) Julien Delaplane (France) N N'Godrela | 2 | 2
(France) M Janvier (Austria) D Novak | 6 | 4 | [3]
2 | (United States) B Klahn (United States) J Withrow | 2 | 6 | [10]

Quarterfinals
1 | (France) H Nys (Germany) T Pütz | 7^{11} | 6^{12} | [11]
(United Kingdom) C Norrie (New Zealand) R Statham | 6^{9} | 7^{14} | [9]
PR | (Poland) H Hurkacz (Poland) M Przysiężny | 6 | 7
(Italy) S Caruso (Italy) F Gaio | 3 | 5
(France) V Millot (France) G Sakharov | 3 | 6 | [11]
PR | (Colombia) A González (Spain) J Munar | 6 | 2 | [13]
WC | (France) E Benchetrit (France) G Blancaneaux | 3 | 5
2 | (United States) B Klahn (United States) J Withrow | 6 | 7

Semifinals
1 | (France) H Nys (Germany) T Pütz | 6 | 6
PR | (Poland) H Hurkacz (Poland) M Przysiężny | 2 | 4
PR | (Colombia) A González (Spain) J Munar | 6 | 4 | [11]
2 | (United States) B Klahn (United States) J Withrow | 4 | 6 | [9]

Final
1 | (France) H Nys (Germany) T Pütz | 6 | 6
PR | (Colombia) A González (Spain) J Munar | 2 | 2
