= 2018 BNP Paribas de Nouvelle-Calédonie =

- Date: 1–6 January
- Edition: 15th
- Draw: 32S / 8Q / 16D
- Surface: Hard
- Location: Nouméa, New Caledonia

Champions

Singles
- (United States) Noah Rubin

Doubles
- (France) Hugo Nys / (Germany) Tim Pütz
← 2017 ·	BNP Paribas de Nouvelle-Calédonie	· 2019 →

The 2018 BNP Paribas de Nouvelle-Calédonie was a professional tennis tournament played on hard courts. It was the fifteenth edition of the tournament which was part of the 2018 ATP Challenger Tour. It took place in Nouméa, New Caledonia between 1–6 January 2018.

== Singles main-draw entrants ==
=== Seeds ===
Country	Player	Rank^{1}	Seed
FRA	Julien Benneteau	56	1
USA	Taylor Fritz	104	2
GBR	Cameron Norrie	114	3
NOR	Casper Ruud	139	4
FRA	Corentin Moutet	155	5
FRA	Gleb Sakharov	156	6
FRA	Kenny de Schepper	159	7
FRA	Mathias Bourgue	161	8

- ^{1} Rankings are as of 25 December 2017.

=== Other entrants ===
The following players received wildcards into the singles main draw:

- (France) Geoffrey Blancaneaux
- (France) Julien Delaplane
- (France) Maxime Janvier
- (Switzerland) Loïc Perret

The following players received entry from the qualifying draw:

- (Italy) Liam Caruana
- (Colombia) Alejandro González
- (Hungary) Zsombor Piros
- (Germany) Tim Pütz

== Champions ==
=== Singles ===
- (United States) Noah Rubin def. (United States) Taylor Fritz 7–5, 6–4.

=== Doubles ===
- (France) Hugo Nys / (Germany) Tim Pütz def. (Colombia) Alejandro González / (Spain) Jaume Munar 6–2, 6–2.
