= 2019 BNP Paribas de Nouvelle-Calédonie – Singles =

Singles
- 2019 BNP Paribas de Nouvelle-Calédonie

Final
- Champion: (Sweden) Mikael Ymer
- Runner-up: (United States) Noah Rubin
- Score: 6–3, 6–3

Events
Singles	Doubles
← 2018 ·	BNP Paribas de Nouvelle-Calédonie	· 2020 →

Noah Rubin was the defending champion but lost in the final to Mikael Ymer.

Ymer won the title after defeating Rubin 6–3, 6–3 in the final.

== Seeds ==
All seeds receive a bye into the second round.

1. (Argentina) Federico Delbonis (semifinals)
2. (France) Quentin Halys (second round)
3. (United States) Noah Rubin (final)
4. (Japan) Yūichi Sugita (third round)
5. (Italy) Salvatore Caruso (third round)
6. (France) Grégoire Barrère (quarterfinals)
7. (Italy) Filippo Baldi (second round)
8. (Serbia) Nikola Milojević (second round)
9. (Slovenia) Blaž Rola (second round)
10. (France) Stéphane Robert (second round)
11. (France) Maxime Janvier (second round)
12. (France) Kenny de Schepper (second round)
13. (Spain) Tommy Robredo (second round)
14. (Belgium) Kimmer Coppejans (second round)
15. (Austria) Jurij Rodionov (quarterfinals)
16. (South Korea) Lee Duck-hee (second round)

== Draw ==
=== Key ===
- Q = Qualifier
- WC = Wild card
- LL = Lucky loser
- Alt = Alternate
- SE = Special exempt
- PR = Protected ranking
- ITF = ITF entry
- JE = Junior exempt
- w/o = Walkover
- r = Retired
- d = Defaulted
- SR = Special ranking

=== Finals ===
Quarterfinals
1	(Argentina) Federico Delbonis	7^{8}	6
6	(France) Grégoire Barrère	6^{6}	4
15	(Austria) Jurij Rodionov	1	4
(Sweden) Mikael Ymer	6	6
(United States) Thai-Son Kwiatkowski	5	3
3	(United States) Noah Rubin	7	6
(France) Gleb Sakharov	7	3	1
(United States) Donald Young	5	6	6

Semifinals
1	(Argentina) Federico Delbonis	2	4
(Sweden) Mikael Ymer	6	6
3	(United States) Noah Rubin	6	6
(United States) Donald Young	2	3

Final
(Sweden) Mikael Ymer	6	6
3	(United States) Noah Rubin	3	3

=== Top half ===
==== Section 1 ====
First round
ITF	(Germany) Tobias Simon	5	7	4
Q	(Netherlands) S Verbeek	7	5	6
(France) A Escoffier	5	3
(France) E Benchetrit	7	6
(Germany) D Brown	6	6
(France) H Grenier	4	4
(United States) C Harrison	3	4
(Croatia) V Galović	6	6

Second round
1	(Argentina) F Delbonis	6	7
Q	(Netherlands) S Verbeek	3	5
(France) E Benchetrit	7^{7}	6
13	(Spain) T Robredo	6^{5}	4
10	(France) S Robert	3	6	0
(Germany) D Brown	6	3	6
(Croatia) V Galović	6	2	3
6	(France) G Barrère	3	6	6

Third round
1	(Argentina) F Delbonis	6	6
(France) E Benchetrit	3	2
(Germany) D Brown	3	3
6	(France) G Barrère	6	6

Quarterfinals
1	(Argentina) F Delbonis	7^{8}	6
6	(France) G Barrère	6^{6}	4

==== Section 2 ====
First round
(Germany) D Masur	6	5	6
WC	(Denmark) F Nielsen	1	7	4
(South Korea) Y-s Chung	6	6
(Bosnia and Herzegovina) T Brkić	3	2
WC	(France) M Chazal	4	4
ITF	(Northern Mariana Islands) C Sinclair	6	6
(Sweden) M Ymer	6	4	6
(France) T Lamasine	4	6	4

Second round
4	(Japan) Y Sugita	6	1	6
(Germany) D Masur	4	6	2
(South Korea) Y-s Chung	4	1
15	(Austria) J Rodionov	6	6
9	(Slovenia) B Rola	5	4
ITF	(Northern Mariana Islands) C Sinclair	7	6
(Sweden) M Ymer	4	7	6
8	(Serbia) N Milojević	6	5	4

Third round
4	(Japan) Y Sugita	1	6^{4}
15	(Austria) J Rodionov	6	7^{7}
ITF	(Northern Mariana Islands) C Sinclair	3	2
(Sweden) M Ymer	6	6

Quarterfinals
15	(Austria) J Rodionov	1	4
(Sweden) M Ymer	6	6

=== Bottom half ===
==== Section 3 ====
First round
ITF	(Chile) MT Barrios Vera	4	6	6
(Brazil) G Clezar	6	2	3
(Italy) L Giustino	2	3
(United States) T-S Kwiatkowski	6	6
(Italy) R Marcora	4	4
WC	(France) H Nys	6	6
(Switzerland) M-A Hüsler	6	7^{7}
(United States) Roy Smith	4	6^{0}

Second round
7	(Italy) F Baldi	1	3
ITF	(Chile) MT Barrios Vera	6	6
(United States) T-S Kwiatkowski	6	6
11	(France) M Janvier	4	4
16	(South Korea) D-h Lee	6	4	2
WC	(France) H Nys	4	6	6
(Switzerland) M-A Hüsler	4	5
3	(United States) N Rubin	6	7

Third round
ITF	(Chile) MT Barrios Vera	3	2
(United States) T-S Kwiatkowski	6	6
WC	(France) H Nys	3	5
3	(United States) N Rubin	6	7

Quarterfinals
(United States) T-S Kwiatkowski	5	3
3	(United States) N Rubin	7	6

==== Section 4 ====
First round
ITF	(France) TK Wang	3	6	6
Q	(Sweden) A Göransson	6	4	3
(France) G Sakharov	6	6
(Japan) Y Takahashi	4	1
(United States) D Young	7^{7}	6
(Argentina) R Olivo	6^{3}	3
WC	(New Zealand) R Statham	3	7^{7}	7
WC	(France) G Blancaneaux	6	6^{3}	5

Second round
5	(Italy) S Caruso	7	7^{7}
ITF	(France) TK Wang	5	6^{2}
(France) G Sakharov	7^{12}	6
12	(France) K de Schepper	6^{10}	4
14	(Belgium) K Coppejans	6	1	6^{4}
(United States) D Young	3	6	7^{7}
WC	(New Zealand) R Statham	6^{5}	6	7^{7}
2	(France) Q Halys	7^{7}	4	6^{5}

Third round
5	(Italy) S Caruso	4	6	3
(France) G Sakharov	6	4	6
(United States) D Young	7	6
WC	(New Zealand) R Statham	5	1

Quarterfinals
(France) G Sakharov	7	3	1
(United States) D Young	5	6	6
