= 2019 BNP Paribas de Nouvelle-Calédonie =

- Date: 31 December – 6 January
- Edition: 16th
- Draw: 48S / 4Q / 16D
- Surface: Hard
- Location: Nouméa, New Caledonia

Champions

Singles
- (Sweden) Mikael Ymer

Doubles
- (Germany) Dustin Brown / (United States) Donald Young
← 2018 ·	BNP Paribas de Nouvelle-Calédonie	· 2020 →

The 2019 BNP Paribas de Nouvelle-Calédonie was a professional tennis tournament played on hard courts. It was the sixteenth edition of the tournament which was part of the 2019 ATP Challenger Tour. It took place in Nouméa, New Caledonia between 31 December 2018 and 6 January 2019.

== Singles main-draw entrants ==
=== Seeds ===
Country	Player	Rank^{1}	Seed
ARG	Federico Delbonis	80	1
FRA	Quentin Halys	128	2
USA	Noah Rubin	135	3
JPN	Yūichi Sugita	145	4
ITA	Salvatore Caruso	158	5
FRA	Grégoire Barrère	163	6
ITA	Filippo Baldi	165	7
SRB	Nikola Milojević	174	8
SLO	Blaž Rola	188	9
FRA	Stéphane Robert	195	10
FRA	Maxime Janvier	196	11
FRA	Kenny de Schepper	197	12
ESP	Tommy Robredo	201	13
BEL	Kimmer Coppejans	212	14
AUT	Jurij Rodionov	217	15
KOR	Lee Duck-hee	218	16

- ^{1}Rankings are as of 24 December 2018.

=== Other entrants ===
The following players received wildcards into the singles main draw:

- (France) Geoffrey Blancaneaux
- (France) Maxime Chazal
- (Denmark) Frederik Nielsen
- (France) Hugo Nys
- (New Zealand) Rubin Statham

The following players received entry into the singles main draw using their ITF World Tennis Ranking:

- (Chile) Marcelo Tomás Barrios Vera
- (Germany) Tobias Simon
- (Northern Mariana Islands) Colin Sinclair
- (France) Tak Khunn Wang

The following players received entry from the qualifying draw:

- (Sweden) André Göransson
- (Netherlands) Sem Verbeek

== Champions ==
=== Singles ===
- (Sweden) Mikael Ymer def. (United States) Noah Rubin 6–3, 6–3.

=== Doubles ===
- (Germany) Dustin Brown / (United States) Donald Young def. (Sweden) André Göransson / (Netherlands) Sem Verbeek 7–5, 6–4.
