= 2020 BNP Paribas de Nouvelle-Calédonie =

- Date: 6–12 January
- Edition: 17th
- Draw: 48S / 4Q / 16D
- Surface: Hard
- Location: Nouméa, New Caledonia

Champions

Singles
- (United States) J. J. Wolf

Doubles
- (Italy) Andrea Pellegrino / (Spain) Mario Vilella Martínez
← 2019 ·	BNP Paribas de Nouvelle-Calédonie	· 2023 →

The 2020 BNP Paribas de Nouvelle-Calédonie was a professional tennis tournament played on hard courts. It was the seventeenth edition of the tournament which was part of the 2020 ATP Challenger Tour. It took place in Nouméa, New Caledonia between 6 and 12 January 2020.

== Singles main-draw entrants ==
=== Seeds ===
Country	Player	Rank^{1}	Seed
ARG	Federico Delbonis	76	1
ESP	Roberto Carballés Baena	80	2
~~AUS~~	~~James Duckworth~~	~~100~~	~~3~~
JPN	Yūichi Sugita	103	4
ITA	Thomas Fabbiano	114	5
AUS	Christopher O'Connell	119	6
ARG	Federico Coria	120	7
ARG	Facundo Bagnis	137	8
SVK	Martin Kližan	141	9
ITA	Federico Gaio	152	10
GBR	Jay Clarke	154	11
GER	Cedrik-Marcel Stebe	165	12
DEN	Mikael Torpegaard	168	13
ESP	Pedro Martínez	170	14
GER	Yannick Hanfmann	172	15
EGY	Mohamed Safwat	175	16

- ^{1} Rankings are as of 30 December 2019.

=== Other entrants ===
The following players received wildcards into the singles main draw:

- (France) Hugo Gaston
- (France) Harold Mayot
- (France) Alexandre Müller
- (Denmark) Holger Rune
- (Northern Mariana Islands) Colin Sinclair

The following players received entry into the singles main draw using protected rankings:

- (Slovenia) Blaž Kavčič
- (Germany) Maximilian Marterer

The following player received entry into the singles main draw as an alternate:

- (Czech Republic) Zdeněk Kolář

The following players received entry from the qualifying draw:

- (United States) Thai-Son Kwiatkowski
- (South Korea) Nam Ji-sung

== Champions ==
=== Singles ===
- (United States) J. J. Wolf def. (Japan) Yūichi Sugita 6–2, 6–2.

=== Doubles ===
- (Italy) Andrea Pellegrino / (Spain) Mario Vilella Martínez def. (Switzerland) Luca Margaroli / (Italy) Andrea Vavassori 7–6^{(7–1)}, 3–6, [12–10].
