= 2018 BNP Paribas de Nouvelle-Calédonie – Singles =

Singles
- 2018 BNP Paribas de Nouvelle-Calédonie

Final
- Champion: (United States) Noah Rubin
- Runner-up: (United States) Taylor Fritz
- Score: 7–5, 6–4

Events
Singles	Doubles
← 2017 ·	BNP Paribas de Nouvelle-Calédonie	· 2019 →

Adrian Mannarino was the defending champion but chose not to defend his title.

Noah Rubin won the title after defeating Taylor Fritz 7–5, 6–4 in the final.

== Seeds ==
1. (France) Julien Benneteau (first round)
2. (United States) Taylor Fritz (final)
3. (United Kingdom) Cameron Norrie (quarterfinals)
4. (Norway) Casper Ruud (quarterfinals)
5. (France) Corentin Moutet (quarterfinals)
6. (France) Gleb Sakharov (semifinals)
7. (France) Kenny de Schepper (semifinals)
8. (France) Mathias Bourgue (first round)

== Draw ==
=== Key ===
- Q = Qualifier
- WC = Wild card
- LL = Lucky loser
- Alt = Alternate
- SE = Special exempt
- PR = Protected ranking
- ITF = ITF entry
- JE = Junior exempt
- w/o = Walkover
- r = Retired
- d = Defaulted
- SR = Special ranking

=== Finals ===
Semifinals
(United States) Noah Rubin	7	6
6	(France) Gleb Sakharov	5	3
7	(France) Kenny de Schepper	3	7^{7}	6^{2}
2	(United States) Taylor Fritz	6	6^{5}	7^{7}

Final
(United States) Noah Rubin	7	6
2	(United States) Taylor Fritz	5	4

=== Top half ===
First round
1	(France) J Benneteau	6	5	1
Q	(Hungary) Z Piros	3	7	6
(United States) N Rubin	6	6
WC	(France) M Janvier	2	4
Q	(Italy) L Caruana	6	6
(United States) M Krueger	3	4
(United States) S Kozlov	6^{4}	6	2
5	(France) C Moutet	7^{7}	3	6
4	(Norway) C Ruud	6	7
(Italy) S Caruso	4	5
WC	(France) Julien Delaplane	4	3
WC	(France) G Blancaneaux	6	6
(France) S Robert	6	6^{4}	6
(United States) C Harrison	2	7^{7}	1
(Italy) F Gaio	4	7^{7}	4
6	(France) G Sakharov	6	6^{5}	6

Second round
Q	(Hungary) Z Piros	4	3
(United States) N Rubin	6	6
Q	(Italy) L Caruana	4	2
5	(France) C Moutet	6	6
4	(Norway) C Ruud	6	6
WC	(France) G Blancaneaux	2	3
(France) S Robert	1	4
6	(France) G Sakharov	6	6

Quarterfinals
(United States) N Rubin	5	6	6
5	(France) C Moutet	7	4	2
4	(Norway) C Ruud	6^{5}	4
6	(France) G Sakharov	7^{7}	6

Semifinals
(United States) N Rubin	7	6
6	(France) G Sakharov	5	3

=== Bottom half ===
First round
7	(France) K de Schepper	6	2	6
(Spain) J Munar	1	6	4
Q	(Colombia) A González	6^{4}	6	6
(United States) D Novikov	7^{7}	3	4
WC	(Switzerland) Loïc Perret	1	1
(France) V Millot	6	6
(Italy) S Napolitano	5	6	6^{5}
3	(United Kingdom) C Norrie	7	4	7^{7}
8	(France) M Bourgue	4	6	4
Q	(Germany) T Pütz	6	1	6
(Poland) H Hurkacz	6	3	7^{7}
(United States) B Klahn	2	6	6^{2}
(New Zealand) R Statham	4	3
(United States) K King	6	6
(Austria) D Novak	3	4
2	(United States) T Fritz	6	6

Second round
7	(France) K de Schepper	6	6
Q	(Colombia) A González	1	2
(France) V Millot	7	2	0
3	(United Kingdom) C Norrie	5	6	6
Q	(Germany) T Pütz	7	6
(Poland) H Hurkacz	5	1
(United States) K King	6^{4}	7	4
2	(United States) T Fritz	7^{7}	5	6

Quarterfinals
7	(France) K de Schepper	6	6
3	(United Kingdom) C Norrie	4	4
Q	(Germany) T Pütz	3	6	2
2	(United States) T Fritz	6	3	6

Semifinals
7	(France) K de Schepper	3	7^{7}	6^{2}
2	(United States) T Fritz	6	6^{5}	7^{7}
