= 2023 Open Nouvelle-Calédonie – Singles =

Singles
- 2023 Open Nouvelle-Calédonie

Final
- Champion: (Italy) Raúl Brancaccio
- Runner-up: (France) Laurent Lokoli
- Score: 4–6, 7–5, 6–2

Events
Singles	Doubles
← 2020 ·	Open Nouvelle-Calédonie	· 2024 →

J. J. Wolf was the defending champion but chose not to defend his title.

Raúl Brancaccio won the title after defeating Laurent Lokoli 4–6, 7–5, 6–2 in the final.

== Seeds ==
1. (Chile) Cristian Garín (semifinals)
2. (France) Hugo Grenier (second round)
3. (Hungary) Zsombor Piros (second round)
4. (United Kingdom) Ryan Peniston (semifinals, withdrew)
5. (France) Geoffrey Blancaneaux (second round)
6. (France) Benoît Paire (quarterfinals)
7. (Bosnia and Herzegovina) Damir Džumhur (quarterfinals)
8. (Italy) Riccardo Bonadio (second round)

== Draw ==
=== Key ===
- Q = Qualifier
- WC = Wild card
- LL = Lucky loser
- Alt = Alternate
- SE = Special exempt
- PR = Protected ranking
- ITF = ITF entry
- JE = Junior exempt
- w/o = Walkover
- r = Retired
- d = Defaulted
- SR = Special ranking

=== Finals ===
Semifinals
1	(Chile) Cristian Garín	6	4	3
(Italy) Raúl Brancaccio	1	6	6
4	(United Kingdom) Ryan Peniston
(France) Laurent Lokoli	w/o

Final
(Italy) Raúl Brancaccio	4	7	6
(France) Laurent Lokoli	6	5	2

=== Top half ===
First round
1	(Chile) C Garín	6	6
Q	(Australia) Ja Delaney	4	2
(South Korea) S-c Hong	4	6	3
WC	(Australia) T Fancutt	6	3	6
(Argentina) F Díaz Acosta	6	6
Q	(Australia) B Walkin	3	4
WC	(Japan) T Matsui	3	3
8	(Italy) R Bonadio	6	6
3	(Hungary) Z Piros	6	6
Q	(Australia) B Mott	4	2
Q	(Australia) C Puttergill	0	3
(Italy) R Brancaccio	6	6
(United States) E Escobedo	6^{2}	6	4
Q	(Australia) B Ellis	7^{7}	2	6
WC	(France) Victor Lopes	1	3
6	(France) B Paire	6	6

Second round
1	(Chile) C Garín	6	6
WC	(Australia) T Fancutt	3	3
(Argentina) F Díaz Acosta	6	7^{7}
8	(Italy) R Bonadio	3	6^{4}
3	(Hungary) Z Piros	2	1
(Italy) R Brancaccio	6	6
Q	(Australia) B Ellis	6	1	3
6	(France) B Paire	3	6	6

Quarterfinals
1	(Chile) C Garín	7	7
(Argentina) F Díaz Acosta	5	5
(Italy) R Brancaccio	5	6	6
6	(France) B Paire	7	0	3

Semifinals
1	(Chile) C Garín	6	4	3
(Italy) R Brancaccio	1	6	6

=== Bottom half ===
First round
7	(Bosnia and Herzegovina) D Džumhur	6	6
Q	(Australia) Jeremy Jin	3	3
(France) M Chazal	6	6
(Italy) R Marcora	3	3
(Northern Mariana Islands) C Sinclair	7	6
(New Zealand) A Rai	5	4
(Japan) K Uchida	7^{9}	4	2
4	(United Kingdom) R Peniston	6^{7}	6	6
5	(France) G Blancaneaux	2	6	6
(Chile) T Barrios Vera	6	3	2
(New Zealand) R Statham	6	6
(Argentina) GA Olivieri	3	4
(France) L Lokoli	6	1	6
(Croatia) N Serdarušić	4	6	0
(Tunisia) S Mansouri	6	3	2
2	(France) H Grenier	4	6	6

Second round
7	(Bosnia and Herzegovina) D Džumhur	6	6
(France) M Chazal	1	3
(Northern Mariana Islands) C Sinclair	6	4	3
4	(United Kingdom) R Peniston	4	6	6
5	(France) G Blancaneaux	6^{6}	6	4
(New Zealand) R Statham	7^{8}	4	6
(France) L Lokoli	4	6	6
2	(France) H Grenier	6	3	0

Quarterfinals
7	(Bosnia and Herzegovina) D Džumhur	2	4
4	(United Kingdom) R Peniston	6	6
(New Zealand) R Statham	7^{7}	3	2
(France) L Lokoli	6^{5}	6	6

Semifinals
4	(United Kingdom) R Peniston
(France) L Lokoli	w/o
