= 2017 BNP Paribas de Nouvelle-Calédonie =

- Date: 2–7 January
- Edition: 14th
- Draw: 32S / 8Q / 16D
- Prize money: $75,000+H
- Surface: Hard
- Location: Nouméa, New Caledonia

Champions

Singles
- (France) Adrian Mannarino

Doubles
- (France) Quentin Halys / (France) Tristan Lamasine
← 2016 ·	BNP Paribas de Nouvelle-Calédonie	· 2018 →

The 2017 BNP Paribas de Nouvelle-Calédonie was a professional tennis tournament played on hard courts. It was the fourteenth edition of the tournament which is part of the 2017 ATP Challenger Tour. It took place in Nouméa, New Caledonia on 2–7 January 2017.

== Singles main-draw entrants ==
=== Seeds ===
Country	Player	Rank^{1}	Seed
FRA	Adrian Mannarino	60	1
ESP	Roberto Carballés Baena	145	2
KOR	Lee Duck-hee	149	3
FRA	Quentin Halys	153	4
FRA	Kenny de Schepper	162	5
USA	Dennis Novikov	169	6
ITA	Stefano Napolitano	172	7
FRA	Mathias Bourgue	183	8

- ^{1} Rankings are as of December 26, 2016.

=== Other entrants ===
The following players received wildcards into the singles main draw:

- (New Caledonia) Alexander Blasco
- (France) Romain Bousquet
- (France) Nicolas N'Godrela
- (New Caledonia) Joanick Pattoua

The following players received entry from the qualifying draw:

- (Australia) Jake Delaney
- (Serbia) Peđa Krstin
- (Switzerland) Luca Margaroli
- (New Zealand) Finn Tearney

== Champions ==
=== Singles ===
- (France) Adrian Mannarino def. (Serbia) Nikola Milojević 6–3, 7–5.

=== Doubles ===
- (France) Quentin Halys / (France) Tristan Lamasine def. (Spain) Adrián Menéndez Maceiras / (Italy) Stefano Napolitano 7–6^{(11–9)}, 6–1.
