= 2017 BNP Paribas de Nouvelle-Calédonie – Singles =

Singles
- 2017 BNP Paribas de Nouvelle-Calédonie

Final
- Champion: (France) Adrian Mannarino
- Runner-up: (Serbia) Nikola Milojević
- Score: 6–3, 7–5

Events
Singles	Doubles
← 2016 ·	BNP Paribas de Nouvelle-Calédonie	· 2018 →

Adrian Mannarino was the defending champion and successfully defended his title, defeating Nikola Milojević 6–3, 7–5 in the final.

== Seeds ==
1. (France) Adrian Mannarino (champion)
2. (Spain) Roberto Carballés Baena (semifinals)
3. (South Korea) Lee Duck-hee (first round)
4. (France) Quentin Halys (second round)
5. (France) Kenny de Schepper (quarterfinals)
6. (United States) Dennis Novikov (first round)
7. (Italy) Stefano Napolitano (first round)
8. (France) Mathias Bourgue (quarterfinals)

== Draw ==
=== Key ===
- Q = Qualifier
- WC = Wild card
- LL = Lucky loser
- Alt = Alternate
- SE = Special exempt
- PR = Protected ranking
- ITF = ITF entry
- JE = Junior exempt
- w/o = Walkover
- r = Retired
- d = Defaulted
- SR = Special ranking

=== Finals ===
Semifinals
1	(France) Adrian Mannarino	6	6
(Colombia) Alejandro Falla	2	1
(Serbia) Nikola Milojević	6	6
2	(Spain) Roberto Carballés Baena	4	4

Final
1	(France) Adrian Mannarino	6	7
(Serbia) Nikola Milojević	3	5

=== Top half ===
First round
1	(France) A Mannarino	6	6
(Australia) A Vukic	1	2
WC	(France) N N'Godrela	3	1
(New Zealand) J Statham	6	6
WC	(New Caledonia) Alexander Blasco	0	0
Q	(Serbia) P Krstin	6	6
(Dominican Republic) J Hernández	6	3	1
5	(France) K de Schepper	4	6	6
3	(South Korea) D-h Lee	4	4
(United Kingdom) C Norrie	6	6
Q	(Switzerland) L Margaroli	2	6	2
(Colombia) A Falla	6	3	6
(Greece) S Tsitsipas	6	7
(Brazil) G Clezar	3	5
(France) T Lamasine	6	7^{7}
6	(United States) D Novikov	4	6^{4}

Second round
1	(France) A Mannarino	6	6
(New Zealand) J Statham	2	1
Q	(Serbia) P Krstin	6	4	5
5	(France) K de Schepper	4	6	7
(United Kingdom) C Norrie	2	6	5
(Colombia) A Falla	6	3	7
(Greece) S Tsitsipas	4	3
(France) T Lamasine	6	6

Quarterfinals
1	(France) A Mannarino	6	6
5	(France) K de Schepper	4	1
(Colombia) A Falla	6	6
(France) T Lamasine	4	3

Semifinals
1	(France) A Mannarino	6	6
(Colombia) A Falla	2	1

=== Bottom half ===
First round
8	(France) M Bourgue	6	6
(United States) M Krueger	1	4
WC	(New Caledonia) Joanick Pattoua	0	0
Q	(New Zealand) F Tearney	6	6
(Brazil) A Ghem	3	3
(Serbia) N Milojević	6	6
WC	(France) Romain Bousquet	0	1
4	(France) Q Halys	6	6
7	(Italy) S Napolitano	6^{1}	4
(Spain) A Menéndez Maceiras	7^{7}	6
(United States) N Rubin	6	7^{7}
(Germany) M Moraing	3	6^{1}
(Australia) M Banes	4	4
(France) C Moutet	6	6
Q	(Australia) J Delaney	2	3
2	(Spain) R Carballés Baena	6	6

Second round
8	(France) M Bourgue	7^{7}	6
Q	(New Zealand) F Tearney	6^{4}	4
(Serbia) N Milojević	6	4	7^{7}
4	(France) Q Halys	2	6	6^{5}
(Spain) A Menéndez Maceiras	6	6
(United States) N Rubin	4	1
(France) C Moutet	6^{3}	0
2	(Spain) R Carballés Baena	7^{7}	6

Quarterfinals
8	(France) M Bourgue	6	6^{3}	5
(Serbia) N Milojević	3	7^{7}	7
(Spain) A Menéndez Maceiras	6^{1}	6	1
2	(Spain) R Carballés Baena	7^{7}	3	6

Semifinals
(Serbia) N Milojević	6	6
2	(Spain) R Carballés Baena	4	4
