= 2017 BNP Paribas de Nouvelle-Calédonie – Doubles =

Doubles
- 2017 BNP Paribas de Nouvelle-Calédonie

Final
- Champions: (France) Quentin Halys (France) Tristan Lamasine
- Runners-up: (Spain) Adrián Menéndez-Maceiras (Italy) Stefano Napolitano
- Score: 7–6^{(11–9)}, 6–1

Events
Singles	Doubles
← 2016 ·	BNP Paribas de Nouvelle-Calédonie	· 2018 →

Julien Benneteau and Édouard Roger-Vasselin were the defending champions but chose not to defend their title.

Quentin Halys and Tristan Lamasine won the title after defeating Adrián Menéndez-Maceiras and Stefano Napolitano 7–6^{(11–9)}, 6–1 in the final.

== Seeds ==
1. (France) Quentin Halys / (France) Tristan Lamasine (champions)
2. (United States) Mitchell Krueger / (United States) Dennis Novikov (quarterfinals)
3. (Switzerland) Luca Margaroli / (Japan) Toshihide Matsui (semifinals)
4. (Brazil) Guilherme Clezar / (Brazil) André Ghem (quarterfinals)

== Draw ==
=== Key ===
- Q = Qualifier
- WC = Wild card
- LL = Lucky loser
- Alt = Alternate
- SE = Special exempt
- PR = Protected ranking
- ITF = ITF entry
- JE = Junior exempt
- w/o = Walkover
- r = Retired
- d = Defaulted
- SR = Special ranking

First round
(Colombia) A Falla (Dominican Republic) J Hernández	6^{7}	1
(United Kingdom) C Norrie (New Zealand) J Statham	7^{9}	6
3	(Switzerland) L Margaroli (Japan) T Matsui	6	6
(Australia) J Delaney (Greece) S Tsitsipas	2	3
WC	(France) N N'Godrela (Switzerland) Loïc Perret	3	3
(United States) N Rubin (Australia) A Vukic	6	6
(New Zealand) B McLachlan (New Zealand) F Tearney	6	3	[8]
(Spain) A Menéndez-Maceiras (Italy) S Napolitano	4	6	[10]
(Serbia) P Krstin (Serbia) N Milojević	6^{3}	1
4	(Brazil) G Clezar (Brazil) A Ghem	7^{7}	6
(Spain) R Carballés Baena (France) K de Schepper	7^{7}	7^{8}
(Australia) M Banes (Germany) M Moraing	6^{5}	6^{6}
(France) M Bourgue (France) C Moutet	5	6^{3}
2	(United States) M Krueger (United States) D Novikov	7	7^{7}

Quarterfinals
1	(France) Q Halys (France) T Lamasine	6	6
(United Kingdom) C Norrie (New Zealand) J Statham	3	1
3	(Switzerland) L Margaroli (Japan) T Matsui	6	6
(United States) N Rubin (Australia) A Vukic	3	3
(Spain) A Menéndez-Maceiras (Italy) S Napolitano	7^{7}	6
4	(Brazil) G Clezar (Brazil) A Ghem	6^{4}	3
(Spain) R Carballés Baena (France) K de Schepper	6	7
2	(United States) M Krueger (United States) D Novikov	3	5

Semifinals
1	(France) Q Halys (France) T Lamasine	6	6^{4}	[11]
3	(Switzerland) L Margaroli (Japan) T Matsui	3	7^{7}	[9]
(Spain) A Menéndez-Maceiras (Italy) S Napolitano	6	2	[10]
(Spain) R Carballés Baena (France) K de Schepper	3	6	[3]

Final
1	(France) Q Halys (France) T Lamasine	7^{11}	6
(Spain) A Menéndez-Maceiras (Italy) S Napolitano	6^{9}	1
