= 2020 BNP Paribas de Nouvelle-Calédonie – Doubles =

Doubles
- 2020 BNP Paribas de Nouvelle-Calédonie

Final
- Champions: (Italy) Andrea Pellegrino (Spain) Mario Vilella Martínez
- Runners-up: (Switzerland) Luca Margaroli (Italy) Andrea Vavassori
- Score: 7–6^{(7–1)}, 3–6, [12–10]

Events
Singles	Doubles
← 2019 ·	BNP Paribas de Nouvelle-Calédonie	· 2023 →

Dustin Brown and Donald Young were the defending champions but chose not to defend their title.

Andrea Pellegrino and Mario Vilella Martínez won the title after defeating Luca Margaroli and Andrea Vavassori 7–6^{(7–1)}, 3–6, [12–10] in the final.

== Seeds ==
1. (Monaco) Romain Arneodo / (Monaco) Hugo Nys (first round)
2. (Sweden) André Göransson / (Netherlands) Sem Verbeek (semifinals)
3. (South Korea) Nam Ji-sung / (South Korea) Song Min-kyu (first round)
4. (Switzerland) Luca Margaroli / (Italy) Andrea Vavassori (final)

== Draw ==
=== Key ===
- Q = Qualifier
- WC = Wild card
- LL = Lucky loser
- Alt = Alternate
- SE = Special exempt
- PR = Protected ranking
- ITF = ITF entry
- JE = Junior exempt
- w/o = Walkover
- r = Retired
- d = Defaulted
- SR = Special ranking

First round
1	(Monaco) R Arneodo (Monaco) H Nys	6	6^{4}	[3]
(Argentina) F Mena (Brazil) J Menezes	3	7^{7}	[10]
(United States) J Cerretani (United States) M Cressy	6^{4}	1
(Italy) A Pellegrino (Spain) M Vilella Martínez	7^{7}	6
3	(South Korea) J-s Nam (South Korea) M-k Song	6	4	[7]
(Italy) T Fabbiano (Italy) M Viola	3	6	[10]
(Japan) Y Sugita (Argentina) M Trungelliti	1	6	[4]
WC	(France) H Gaston (France) H Mayot	6	2	[10]
(Spain) P Martínez (Spain) B Zapata Miralles	6^{3}	3
(Czech Republic) Z Kolář (Czech Republic) L Rosol	7^{7}	6
(Italy) F Gaio (Italy) R Marcora
4	(Switzerland) L Margaroli (Italy) A Vavassori	w/o
WC	(United Kingdom) J Clarke (France) H Grenier	6	3	[5]
WC	(France) E Benchetrit (France) E Coaucaud	4	6	[10]
PR	(Slovenia) B Kavčič (Egypt) M Safwat	4	4
2	(Sweden) A Göransson (Netherlands) S Verbeek	6	6

Quarterfinals
(Argentina) F Mena (Brazil) J Menezes	4	6^{8}
(Italy) A Pellegrino (Spain) M Vilella Martínez	6	7^{10}
(Italy) T Fabbiano (Italy) M Viola	6	2	[10]
WC	(France) H Gaston (France) H Mayot	4	6	[7]
(Czech Republic) Z Kolář (Czech Republic) L Rosol
4	(Switzerland) L Margaroli (Italy) A Vavassori	w/o
WC	(France) E Benchetrit (France) E Coaucaud	4	4
2	(Sweden) A Göransson (Netherlands) S Verbeek	6	6

Semifinals
(Italy) A Pellegrino (Spain) M Vilella Martínez	6	6
(Italy) T Fabbiano (Italy) M Viola	4	2
4	(Switzerland) L Margaroli (Italy) A Vavassori	7^{7}	6
2	(Sweden) A Göransson (Netherlands) S Verbeek	6^{3}	3

Final
(Italy) A Pellegrino (Spain) M Vilella Martínez	7^{7}	3	[12]
4	(Switzerland) L Margaroli (Italy) A Vavassori	6^{1}	6	[10]
