= 2020 BNP Paribas de Nouvelle-Calédonie – Singles =

Singles
- 2020 BNP Paribas de Nouvelle-Calédonie

Final
- Champion: (United States) J. J. Wolf
- Runner-up: (Japan) Yūichi Sugita
- Score: 6–2, 6–2

Events
Singles	Doubles
← 2019 ·	BNP Paribas de Nouvelle-Calédonie	· 2023 →

Mikael Ymer was the defending champion but chose not to defend his title.

J. J. Wolf won the title after defeating Yūichi Sugita 6–2, 6–2 in the final.

== Seeds ==
All seeds receive a bye into the second round.

1. (Argentina) Federico Delbonis (second round)
2. (Spain) Roberto Carballés Baena (second round)
3. (Australia) James Duckworth (withdrew)
4. (Japan) Yūichi Sugita (final)
5. (Italy) Thomas Fabbiano (third round)
6. (Australia) Christopher O'Connell (third round)
7. (Argentina) Federico Coria (third round)
8. (Argentina) Facundo Bagnis (second round)
9. (Slovakia) Martin Kližan (quarterfinals)
10. (Italy) Federico Gaio (second round)
11. (United Kingdom) Jay Clarke (second round)
12. (Germany) Cedrik-Marcel Stebe (semifinals)
13. (Denmark) Mikael Torpegaard (second round)
14. (Spain) Pedro Martínez (second round)
15. (Germany) Yannick Hanfmann (third round)
16. (Egypt) Mohamed Safwat (second round)

== Draw ==
=== Key ===
- Q = Qualifier
- WC = Wild card
- LL = Lucky loser
- Alt = Alternate
- ITF = ITF entry
- PR = Protected ranking
- SR = Special ranking
- SE = Special exempt
- JE = Junior exempt
- JR = Junior Accelerator Programme entrant
- CO = College Accelerator Programme entrant
- NG = Next Gen Accelerator Program entrant
- w/o = Walkover
- r = Retired
- d = Defaulted

=== Finals ===
Quarterfinals
(France) Tristan Lamasine	4	1
12	(Germany) Cedrik-Marcel Stebe	6	6
4	(Japan) Yūichi Sugita	6	6
9	(Slovakia) Martin Kližan	1	2
(Italy) Roberto Marcora	6^{2}	6^{5}
(Italy) Matteo Viola	7^{7}	7^{7}
PR	(Slovenia) Blaž Kavčič	3	4
(United States) J. J. Wolf	6	6

Semifinals
12	(Germany) Cedrik-Marcel Stebe	5	6	3
4	(Japan) Yūichi Sugita	7	4	6
(Italy) Matteo Viola	2	2
(United States) J. J. Wolf	6	6

Final
4	(Japan) Yūichi Sugita	2	2
(United States) J. J. Wolf	6	6

=== Top half ===
==== Section 1 ====
First round
(France) T Lamasine	4	6	7
(Spain) B Zapata Miralles	6	4	5
PR	(Germany) M Marterer	6	3	6^{5}
(Latvia) E Gulbis	1	6	7^{7}
WC	(Denmark) H Rune	1	4
(Germany) M Bachinger	6	6
(Russia) A Vatutin	3	6	4
(United States) M Cressy	6	3	6

Second round
1	(Argentina) F Delbonis	3	4
(France) T Lamasine	6	6
(Latvia) E Gulbis	6	6
16	(Egypt) M Safwat	4	4
12	(Germany) C-M Stebe	7^{7}	0
(Germany) M Bachinger	6^{2}	0^{r}
(United States) M Cressy	6	4	3
7	(Argentina) F Coria	4	6	6

Third round
(France) T Lamasine	6	6
(Latvia) E Gulbis	2	2
12	(Germany) C-M Stebe	6	6
7	(Argentina) F Coria	1	3

Quarterfinals
(France) T Lamasine	4	1
12	(Germany) C-M Stebe	6	6

==== Section 2 ====
First round
(Japan) H Moriya	7	6
(Spain) M Vilella Martínez	5	3
(Czech Republic) L Rosol	6	4	6^{0}
(Argentina) M Trungelliti	4	6	7^{7}
Q	(United States) T-S Kwiatkowski	6	6
(France) C Lestienne	4	2
(France) E Couacaud	4	5
(Kazakhstan) D Popko	6	7

Second round
4	(Japan) Y Sugita	4	6	6
(Japan) H Moriya	6	4	3
(Argentina) M Trungelliti	6	3	6
13	(Denmark) M Torpegaard	3	6	1
9	(Slovakia) M Kližan	7^{11}	4	6
Q	(United States) T-S Kwiatkowski	6^{9}	6	4
(Kazakhstan) D Popko	6^{9}	4
6	(Australia) C O'Connell	7^{11}	6

Third round
4	(Japan) Y Sugita	2	6	7^{10}
(Argentina) M Trungelliti	6	4	6^{8}
9	(Slovakia) M Kližan	7^{7}	6
6	(Australia) C O'Connell	6^{2}	2

Quarterfinals
4	(Japan) Y Sugita	6	6
9	(Slovakia) M Kližan	1	2

=== Bottom half ===
==== Section 3 ====
First round
WC	(France) H Mayot	4	6	6
WC	(Northern Mariana Islands) C Sinclair	6	3	2
(Italy) R Marcora	6	3	6
(Spain) C Taberner	3	6	3
(Brazil) J Menezes	4	6	6
Q	(South Korea) J-s Nam	6	1	3
(Italy) M Viola	6	7^{7}
(Argentina) A Collarini	3	6^{4}

Second round
8	(Argentina) F Bagnis	6	3	3
WC	(France) H Mayot	3	6	6
(Italy) R Marcora	7^{7}	6^{6}	7^{7}
10	(Italy) F Gaio	6^{5}	7^{8}	6^{2}
15	(Germany) Y Hanfmann	6	6
(Brazil) J Menezes	4	2
(Italy) M Viola	6	4	6
Alt	(Czech Republic) Z Kolář	4	6	4

Third round
WC	(France) H Mayot	2	2
(Italy) R Marcora	6	6
15	(Germany) Y Hanfmann	4	7^{7}	4
(Italy) M Viola	6	6^{5}	6

Quarterfinals
(Italy) R Marcora	6^{2}	6^{5}
(Italy) M Viola	7^{7}	7^{7}

==== Section 4 ====
First round
(China) Y Bai	4	6^{6}
WC	(France) H Gaston	6	7^{8}
(France) E Benchetrit	4	5
PR	(Slovenia) B Kavčič	6	7
(France) Q Halys	6^{2}	1
WC	(France) A Müller	7^{7}	6
(United States) J. J. Wolf	6	6
(Argentina) F Mena	2	2

Second round
5	(Italy) T Fabbiano	6	6
WC	(France) H Gaston	2	2
PR	(Slovenia) B Kavčič	6	6
11	(United Kingdom) J Clarke	4	2
14	(Spain) P Martínez	6^{5}	3
WC	(France) A Müller	7^{7}	6
(United States) J. J. Wolf	6	6^{9}	6
2	(Spain) R Carballés Baena	2	7^{11}	2

Third round
5	(Italy) T Fabbiano	4	6^{3}
PR	(Slovenia) B Kavčič	6	7^{7}
WC	(France) A Müller	1	3
(United States) J. J. Wolf	6	6

Quarterfinals
PR	(Slovenia) B Kavčič	3	4
(United States) J. J. Wolf	6	6
