= 2023 Open Nouvelle-Calédonie =

- Date: 2–7 January
- Edition: 18th
- Surface: Hard
- Location: Nouméa, New Caledonia

Champions

Singles
- (Italy) Raúl Brancaccio

Doubles
- (Northern Mariana Islands) Colin Sinclair / (New Zealand) Rubin Statham
← 2020 ·	Open Nouvelle-Calédonie	· 2024 →

The 2023 Open SIFA Nouvelle-Calédonie was a professional tennis tournament played on hard courts. It was the 18th edition of the tournament which was part of the 2023 ATP Challenger Tour. It took place in Nouméa, New Caledonia between 2 and 7 January 2023.

== Singles main-draw entrants ==
=== Seeds ===
Country	Player	Rank^{1}	Seed
CHI	Cristian Garín	85	1
FRA	Hugo Grenier	141	2
HUN	Zsombor Piros	162	3
GBR	Ryan Peniston	167	4
FRA	Geoffrey Blancaneaux	170	5
FRA	Benoît Paire	179	6
BIH	Damir Džumhur	186	7
ITA	Riccardo Bonadio	187	8

- ^{1} Rankings are as of 26 December 2022.

=== Other entrants ===
The following players received wildcards into the singles main draw:

- (Australia) Thomas Fancutt
- (France) Victor Lopes
- (Japan) Toshihide Matsui

The following players received entry from the qualifying draw:

- (Australia) Jake Delaney
- (Australia) Blake Ellis
- (Australia) Jeremy Jin
- (Australia) Blake Mott
- (Australia) Calum Puttergill
- (Australia) Brandon Walkin

== Champions ==
=== Singles ===
- (Italy) Raúl Brancaccio def. (France) Laurent Lokoli 4–6, 7–5, 6–2.

=== Doubles ===
- (Northern Mariana Islands) Colin Sinclair / (New Zealand) Rubin Statham def. (Japan) Toshihide Matsui / (Japan) Kaito Uesugi 6–4, 6–3.
