= 2019 BNP Paribas de Nouvelle-Calédonie – Doubles =

Doubles
- 2019 BNP Paribas de Nouvelle-Calédonie

Final
- Champions: (Germany) Dustin Brown (United States) Donald Young
- Runners-up: (Sweden) André Göransson (Netherlands) Sem Verbeek
- Score: 7–5, 6–4

Events
| Singles | Doubles |
| ← 2018 · | BNP Paribas de Nouvelle-Calédonie | · 2020 → |

Hugo Nys and Tim Pütz were the defending champions but only Nys chose to defend his title, partnering Elliot Benchetrit. Nys lost in the first round to Salvatore Caruso and Kenny de Schepper.

Dustin Brown and Donald Young won the title after defeating André Göransson and Sem Verbeek 7–5, 6–4 in the final.

== Seeds ==
1. (Denmark) Frederik Nielsen / (Australia) Matt Reid (quarterfinals)
2. (France) Elliot Benchetrit / (France) Hugo Nys (first round)
3. (Germany) Dustin Brown / (United States) Donald Young (champions)
4. (Bosnia and Herzegovina) Tomislav Brkić / (Serbia) Nikola Milojević (first round)

== Draw ==
=== Key ===
- Q = Qualifier
- WC = Wild card
- LL = Lucky loser
- Alt = Alternate
- SE = Special exempt
- PR = Protected ranking
- ITF = ITF entry
- JE = Junior exempt
- w/o = Walkover
- r = Retired
- d = Defaulted
- SR = Special ranking

First round
1 | (Denmark) F Nielsen (Australia) M Reid | 3 | 6 | [10]
(Italy) F Baldi (Italy) R Marcora | 6 | 3 | [5]
ITF | (Sweden) A Göransson (Netherlands) S Verbeek | 6 | 6
(Brazil) G Clezar (Italy) L Giustino | 3 | 2
4 | (Bosnia and Herzegovina) T Brkić (Serbia) N Milojević | 0 | 3
WC | (France) M Chazal (France) G Sakharov | 6 | 6
(United States) T-S Kwiatkowski (United States) N Rubin | 6 | 6
Alt | (France) H Grenier (France) M Janvier | 4 | 4
ITF | (United States) JP Fruttero (Switzerland) M-A Hüsler | 3 | 6 | [10]
(Croatia) V Galović (Slovenia) B Rola | 6 | 3 | [6]
WC | (Argentina) R Olivo (New Zealand) R Statham | 7^{7} | 4 | [4]
3 | (Germany) D Brown (United States) D Young | 6^{2} | 6 | [10]
(France) G Blancaneaux (Belgium) K Coppejans | 4 | 7 | [13]
(France) G Barrère (France) T Lamasine | 6 | 5 | [11]
(Italy) S Caruso (France) K de Schepper | 7^{7} | 6^{4} | [10]
2 | (France) E Benchetrit (France) H Nys | 6^{4} | 7^{7} | [5]

Quarterfinals
1 | (Denmark) F Nielsen (Australia) M Reid | 6 | 6^{3} | [5]
ITF | (Sweden) A Göransson (Netherlands) S Verbeek | 4 | 7^{7} | [10]
WC | (France) M Chazal (France) G Sakharov | 5 | 4
(United States) T-S Kwiatkowski (United States) N Rubin | 7 | 6
ITF | (United States) JP Fruttero (Switzerland) M-A Hüsler | 4 | 2
3 | (Germany) D Brown (United States) D Young | 6 | 6
(France) G Blancaneaux (Belgium) K Coppejans | 4 | 6 | [10]
(Italy) S Caruso (France) K de Schepper | 6 | 3 | [4]

Semifinals
ITF | (Sweden) A Göransson (Netherlands) S Verbeek | 4 | 6 | [10]
(United States) T-S Kwiatkowski (United States) N Rubin | 6 | 4 | [1]
3 | (Germany) D Brown (United States) D Young | 7 | 6
(France) G Blancaneaux (Belgium) K Coppejans | 5 | 4

Final
ITF | (Sweden) A Göransson (Netherlands) S Verbeek | 5 | 4
3 | (Germany) D Brown (United States) D Young | 7 | 6
