= Laurent Lokoli =

French tennis player

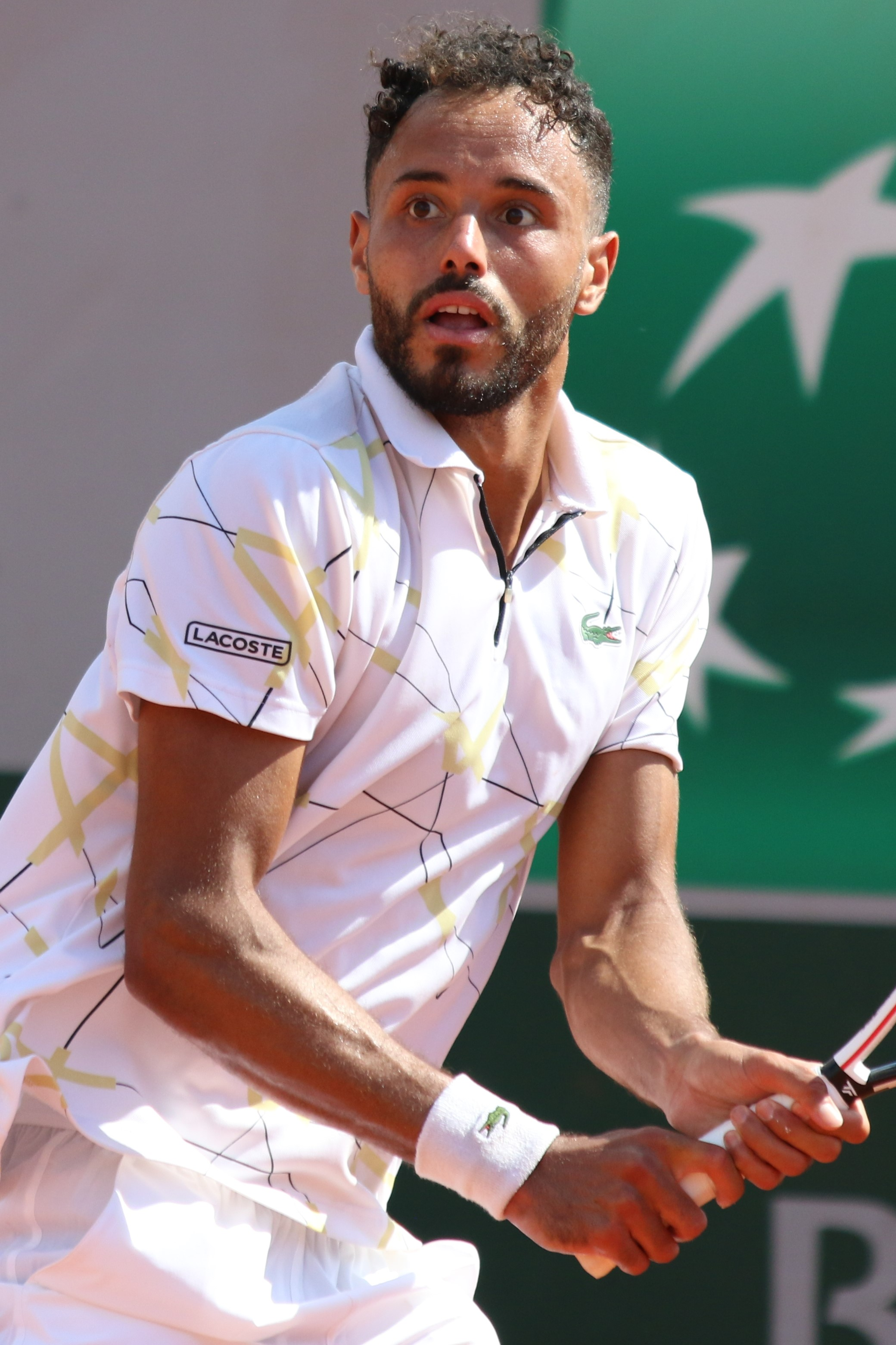
- Lokoli at the 2022 French Open
- Country (sports): France
- Born: 18 October 1994 (age 32) Bastia, France
- Height: 1.88 m (6 ft 2 in)
- Turned pro: 2011
- Plays: Right-handed (two-handed backhand)
- Coach: Jonathan Kanar, Walter Grunfeld Tennis Academy (WGTA)
- Prize money: US $716,033

Singles
- Career record: 0–8
- Career titles: 0
- Highest ranking: No. 167 (27 February 2023)
- Current ranking: No. 334 (19 October 2026)

Grand Slam singles results
- Australian Open: 1R (2015, 2023)
- French Open: 1R (2014, 2017)
- Wimbledon: 1R (2023)
- US Open: Q1 (2022, 2023)

Doubles
- Career record: 0–2
- Career titles: 0
- Highest ranking: No. 371 (3 November 2014)

Grand Slam doubles results
- French Open: 1R (2014)
- Last updated on: 19 October 2026.

Laurent Lokoli (born 18 October 1994) is a French professional tennis player. Lokoli plays primarily ATP Challenger and ITF events. He has a career-high ATP singles ranking of No. 167 achieved on 27 February 2023 and a doubles ranking of No. 371 achieved on 3 November 2014.

== Career ==
Ranked No. 406, Lokoli received a wildcard for the 2014 French Open singles qualifying draw. At 19 years and 7 months, he won three qualifying matches and hence advanced to the main draw. He lost to Steve Johnson.

He was given a wildcard for the 2017 French Open where he lost in the first round to Martin Kližan. He made minor news by twice refusing to shake hands with Klizan after the match. He reached the top 200 at No. 199 on 3 October 2022.

Lokoli made his first Challenger final at the 2023 Open Nouvelle-Calédonie in Nouméa, New Caledonia losing to Raúl Brancaccio. As a result, he reached a new career-high ranking of No. 176 inside the top 200 on 9 January 2023. Next he qualified into the 2023 Australian Open main draw after 8 years of absence. In July 2023, Lokoli made his Wimbledon debut as a qualifier, losing to fourth seed Casper Ruud in the first round.

== Personal life ==
He is the son of former French footballer Dominique Lokoli. Through his father, he is of Congolese descent.

== ATP Challenger and ITF Tour Finals ==
=== Singles: 32 (19 titles, 13 runner-ups) ===
| Legend (singles) ATP Challenger Tour (0–1) ITF Futures/World Tennis Tour (19–12) | Titles by surface Hard (9–6) Clay (10–6) Grass (0–0) Carpet (0–1) |

| Result | W–L | Date | Tournament | Tier | Surface | Opponent | Score |
|---|---|---|---|---|---|---|---|
| Loss | 0–1 | Aug 2013 | Finland F1, Vierumäki | Futures | Clay | (France) Tak Khunn Wang | 4-6, 3–6 |
| Win | 1-1 | Aug 2013 | Austria F7, Innsbruck | Futures | Clay | (Austria) Dennis Novak | 7–6^{(7–1)}, 6–3 |
| Loss | 1-2 | Sep 2014 | France F17, Bagnères-de-Bigorre | Futures | Hard | (France) Enzo Couacaud | 2-6, 3–6 |
| Loss | 1-3 | Oct 2014 | France F22, Saint-Dizier | Futures | Hard (i) | (France) Rémi Boutillier | 4-6, 4–6 |
| Win | 2-3 | Nov 2014 | Cyprus F2, Larnaca | Futures | Hard | (Cyprus) Petros Chrysochos | 6-4, 6–0 |
| Win | 3-3 | Apr 2016 | Italy F7, Santa Margherita di Pula | Futures | Clay | (Netherlands) Tim van Rijthoven | 6-3, 6–2 |
| Win | 4-3 | Jun 2016 | Bosnia Herzegovina F4, Sarajevo | Futures | Clay | (Australia) Steven de Waard | 6-3, 6–1 |
| Loss | 4-4 | Jun 2016 | France F11, Toulon | Futures | Clay | (Morocco) Lamine Ouahab | 3-6, 6-7^{(3–7)} |
| Loss | 4-5 | Aug 2016 | Switzerland F3, Collonge-Bellerive | Futures | Clay | (Germany) Tobias Simon | 3-6, 4–6 |
| Loss | 4-6 | Aug 2016 | Switzerland F4, Lausanne | Futures | Clay | (Switzerland) Cristian Villagrán | 4–6, 7–6^{(8–6)}, 3–6 |
| Win | 5-6 | Sep 2016 | France F18, Mulhouse | Futures | Hard | (United States) Raymond Sarmiento | 4–6, 6–2, 7–6^{(7–4)} |
| Loss | 5-7 | Feb 2017 | Switzerland F1, Oberentfelden | Futures | Carpet (i) | (Italy) Matteo Berrettini | 2-6, 4–6 |
| Win | 6-7 | Feb 2018 | Tunisia F4, Djerba | Futures | Hard | (France) Geoffrey Blancaneaux | 6-2, 6–1 |
| Loss | 6-8 | Feb 2019 | M15, Sharm El Sheikh, Egypt | World Tennis Tour | Hard | (Egypt) Karim-Mohamed Maamoun | 3-6, 1–6 |
| Win | 7-8 | Apr 2019 | M25, Santa Margherita di Pula, Italy | World Tennis Tour | Clay | (Serbia) Miljan Zekić | 5–7, 7–5, 6–2 |
| Win | 8-8 | Jul 2019 | M25, Bakio, Spain | World Tennis Tour | Hard | (France) Hugo Grenier | 6-3, 6–3 |
| Win | 9-8 | Jul 2019 | M25, Ajaccio, France | World Tennis Tour | Hard | (France) Quentin Robert | 3–6, 7–5, 6–3 |
| Loss | 9-9 | Jan 2022 | M25, Monastir, Tunisia | World Tennis Tour | Hard | (Tunisia) Moez Echargui | 4-6, 5–7 |
| Win | 10-9 | Feb 2022 | M15, Monastir, Tunisia | World Tennis Tour | Hard | (Bulgaria) Alexander Donski | 6–0, 3–6, 7–5 |
| Win | 11-9 | Feb 2022 | M25, Vale do Lobo, Portugal | World Tennis Tour | Hard | (Spain) Alejandro Moro Cañas | 6-2, 6–1 |
| Win | 12-9 | Apr 2022 | M25, Santa Margherita di Pula, Italy | World Tennis Tour | Clay | (United Kingdom) Felix Gill | 7-5, 6–3 |
| Win | 13-9 | Apr 2022 | M25, Santa Margherita di Pula, Italy | World Tennis Tour | Clay | (Serbia) Miljan Zekić | 6–2, 5–7, 6–4 |
| Loss | 13-10 | Jun 2022 | M25, La Nucia, Spain | World Tennis Tour | Clay | (Dominican Republic) Nick Hardt | 0-6, 4–6 |
| Win | 14-10 | Jun 2022 | M25, Skopje, North Macedonia | World Tennis Tour | Clay | (Brazil) Orlando Luz | 6-2, 6–1 |
| Loss | 14–11 | Jan 2023 | Nouméa, New Caledonia | Challenger | Hard | (Italy) Raúl Brancaccio | 6–4, 5–7, 2–6 |
| Win | 15-11 | Jun 2022 | M25, Monastir, Tunisia | World Tennis Tour | Hard | (Czech Republic) Tadeas Paroulek | 6–2, 7–5 |
| Win | 16-11 | Jun 2022 | M25, Bol, Croatia | World Tennis Tour | Clay | (Portugal) Tiago Pereira | 6–4, 4–6, 6–4 |
| Loss | 16–12 | Jul 2025 | M25 Ajaccio, France | World Tennis Tour | Hard | (France) Antoine Escoffier | 6–7^{(5–7)}, 6–7^{(5–7)} |
| Win | 17–12 | Jun 2026 | M25 Ajaccio, France | World Tennis Tour | Hard | (France) Dan Added | 3–6, 6–3, 6–2 |
| Win | 18–12 | Jul 2026 | M25 Lucciana, France | World Tennis Tour | Clay | (France) Yanis Ghazouani Durand | 6–3, 6–1 |
| Win | 19–12 | Aug 2026 | M25 Lesa, Italy | World Tennis Tour | Clay | (Italy) Pierluigi Basile | 3–6, 6–3, 6–0 |
| Loss | 19–13 | Sep 2026 | M25 Santa Margherita di Pula, Italy | World Tennis Tour | Clay | (Poland) Daniel Michalski | 6–7^{(5–7)}, 2–6 |
