= Raúl Brancaccio =

Italian tennis player

- Brancaccio at the 2026 Wimbledon Championships
- Country (sports): Italy
- Residence: Torre del Greco, Italy
- Born: 4 May 1997 (age 29) Torre del Greco, Italy
- Height: 1.83 m (6 ft 0 in)
- Plays: Right-handed (two-handed backhand)
- Coach: Marco Brancaccio, Ciro Figaro
- Prize money: US $590,582

Singles
- Career record: 0–2 (at ATP Tour level, Grand Slam level, and in Davis Cup)
- Career titles: 0
- Highest ranking: No. 121 (13 February 2023)
- Current ranking: No. 248 (22 June 2026)

Grand Slam singles results
- Australian Open: Q2 (2023)
- French Open: Q1 (2023)
- Wimbledon: Q1 (2023, 2026)
- US Open: Q3 (2022)

Doubles
- Career record: 0–0 (at ATP Tour level, Grand Slam level, and in Davis Cup)
- Career titles: 0
- Highest ranking: No. 252 (26 September 2022)
- Current ranking: No. 667 (22 June 2026)
- Last updated on: 22 June 2026.

Raúl Brancaccio (born 4 May 1997) is an Italian tennis player. He has a career high ATP singles ranking of world No. 121 achieved on 13 February 2023 and a career high ATP doubles ranking of world No. 252 achieved on 26 September 2022.

== Career ==
=== 2021: ATP debut ===
Brancaccio made his ATP main draw debut at the 2021 Emilia-Romagna Open after qualifying for the singles main draw.

=== 2023: Top 125 debut ===
He won his second Challenger title at the 2023 Open Nouvelle-Calédonie in Nouméa, New Caledonia saving a championship point before a four-hour rain delay, defeating Frenchman Laurent Lokoli. He reached his second Challenger final at the 2023 Tenerife Challenger II for the season where he lost to Matteo Arnaldi. As a result, he reached a new career-high ranking of No. 121 on 13 February 2023.

== Controversy ==
On March 25, 2024, Raul Brancaccio played against Pierre-Hugues Herbert in the first round of the 2024 Tennis Napoli Cup Challenger. After failing to convert 7 match points, he went on to lose the match. Despite being born 20 minutes away from Naples in Torre del Greco, the crowd was actively hostile towards him. After the match, he took to Instagram to voice his displeasure in a strongly worded statement, blaming sports bettors for the chaos during the match.

== Personal life ==
Brancaccio has a Spanish mother and an Italian father. His sister Nuria Brancaccio is also a tennis player.

== ATP Challenger and ITF Tour finals ==
=== Singles: 17 (9–8) ===
Legend (singles) ATP Challenger Tour (3–2) ITF Futures/World Tennis Tour (6–6)	Titles by surface Hard (1–2) Clay (8–6) Grass (0–0)

Result	W–L	Date	Tournament	Tier	Surface	Opponent	Score
Loss	0–1	Dec 2016	Tunisia F36, Hammamet	Futures	Clay	(Hungary) Attila Balázs	4–6, 2–6
Loss	0–2	Dec 2017	Tunisia F37, Hammamet	Futures	Clay	(Portugal) Gonçalo Oliveira	3–6, 2–6
Win	1–2	May 2018	Italy F11, Naples	Futures	Clay	(Italy) Pietro Rondoni	6–2, 6–7^{(3–7)}, 6–0
Loss	1–3	Sep 2018	Spain F25, San Sebastián	Futures	Clay	(Spain) Javier Barranco Cosano	1–6, 1–6
Win	2–3	Sep 2018	Spain F28, Madrid	Futures	Clay	(Chile) Gonzalo Lama	6–3, 3–6, 6–1
Win	3–3	Oct 2018	Italy F32, Santa Margherita di Pula	Futures	Clay	(Italy) Stefano Baldoni	6–2, 6–3
Win	4–3	Oct 2018	Italy F33, Santa Margherita Di Pula	Futures	Clay	(Bulgaria) Dimitar Kuzmanov	6–4, 6–4
Win	5–3	May 2019	M25 Vic, Spain	World Tennis Tour	Clay	(Argentina) Facundo Diaz Acosta	5–7, 7–5, 6–3
Win	6–3	Feb 2021	M15 Antalya, Turkey	World Tennis Tour	Clay	(Ukraine) Oleksii Krutykh	6–4, 6–4
Win	7–3	Jul 2022	San Benedetto, Italy	Challenger	Clay	(Italy) Andrea Vavassori	6–1, 6–1
Win	8–3	Jan 2023	Nouméa, New Caledonia	Challenger	Hard	(France) Laurent Lokoli	4–6, 7–5, 6–2
Loss	8–4	Feb 2023	Tenerife, Spain	Challenger	Hard	(Italy) Matteo Arnaldi	1–6, 2–6
Loss	8–5	Jul 2024	M25 Gandia, Spain	World Tennis Tour	Clay	(Spain) Carlos Sánchez Jover	6–3, 2–6, 5–7
Loss	8–6	Mar 2025	M25 Tarragona, Spain	World Tennis Tour	Clay	(Spain) Nikolás Sánchez Izquierdo	1–6, 3–6
Loss	8–7	Jun 2025	M25 Córdoba, Spain	World Tennis Tour	Clay	(Italy) Jacopo Berrettini	6–4, 6–7^{(2–7)}, 4–6
Loss	8–8	Feb 2026	Cesenatico, Italy	Challenger	Hard (i)	(Ukraine) Oleg Prihodko	7–6^{(10–8)}, 4–6, 4–6
Win	9–8	Mar 2026	Menorca, Spain	Challenger	Clay	(Spain) Àlex Martínez	6–1, 6–4
