= Corentin Moutet =

French tennis player (born 1999)

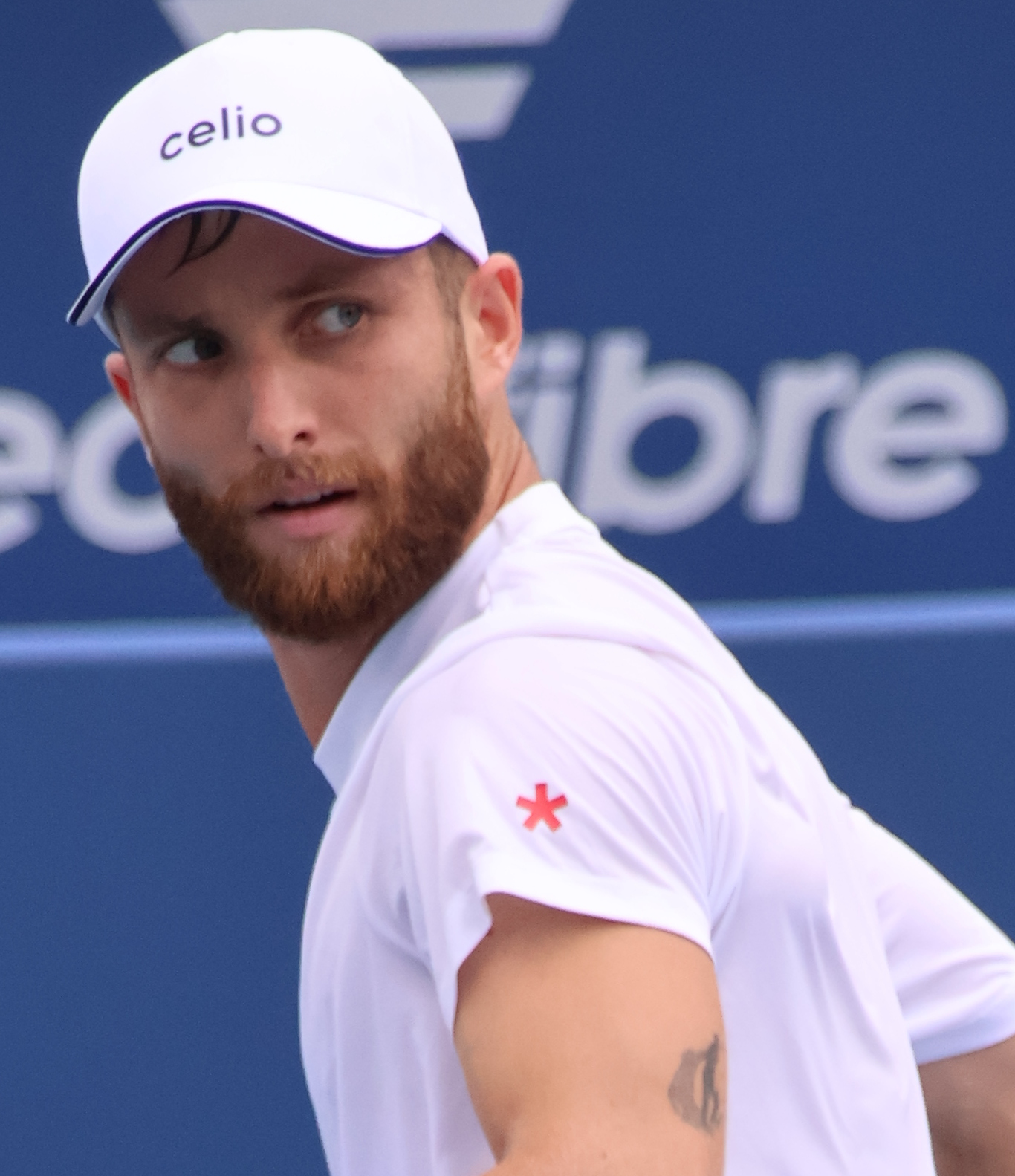
- Moutet at the 2025 DC Open
- Country (sports): France
- Residence: Boulogne-Billancourt, Hauts-de-Seine, France
- Born: 19 April 1999 (age 27) Neuilly-sur-Seine, Hauts-de-Seine, France
- Height: 1.80 m (5 ft 11 in)
- Turned pro: 2016
- Plays: Left-handed (one and two-handed backhand)
- Coach: Mikael Tillström (2026-); Petar Popović (2022–2025); Laurent Raymond (2019–2022)
- Prize money: US $6,537,192

Singles
- Career record: 104–132
- Career titles: 0
- Highest ranking: No. 30 (20 April 2026)
- Current ranking: No. 57 (27 July 2026)

Grand Slam singles results
- Australian Open: 3R (2025, 2026)
- French Open: 4R (2024)
- Wimbledon: 2R (2019, 2023, 2025)
- US Open: 4R (2022)

Other tournaments
- Olympic Games: 3R (2024)

Doubles
- Career record: 5–7
- Career titles: 0
- Highest ranking: No. 253 (27 July 2026)
- Current ranking: No. 253 (27 July 2026)

Grand Slam doubles results
- Australian Open: 2R (2026)
- French Open: 2R (2017)
- Wimbledon: 2R (2026)
- Last updated on: 27 July 2026.

Corentin Moutet (French pronunciation: [kɔʁɑ̃tɛ̃ mutɛ]; born 19 April 1999) is a French professional tennis player. He has a career-high ATP singles ranking of world No. 30 achieved on 20 April 2026 and a doubles ranking of No. 253 achieved on 27 July 2026. He is currently the No. 4 singles player from France.

Moutet has won six ATP Challenger and five ITF Tour singles titles. Moutet made his ATP Tour main draw doubles debut at the 2017 French Open after receiving a wildcard to the main draw with Constant Lestienne.

== Junior career ==
=== 2013: First ITF tournaments, first titles ===
In April, Moutet entered the singles qualifying of the ITF Junior Cap d'Ail. Two tournaments later, he reached his first singles final at the Podgorica Open. At the Copa Santa Catarina Internacional in October, Moutet again reached the singles final, losing to João Menezes in straight sets. In doubles, he took his first title with Fernando Yamacita. At the Copa Guga Kuerten, his final tournament of the year, he proved victorious in both doubles, again partnering Yamacita, and singles, where he defeated Yamacita in the final.

=== 2014: Doubles success, junior Grand Slam debut ===
Moutet continued to prove himself in doubles competition, taking two titles and finishing runner-up once. In April, at Beaulieu-sur-Mer, he and his partner Johan Sébastian Tatlot took out Maxime Janvier and Alexandre Müller in straight sets. Moutet and Tatlot again partnered at Roehampton in June, reaching the final before losing in straight sets. In October, he won his second title of the year at the Dunlop Srixon Japan Open Junior Championships, this time partnering Akira Santillan.

While successful in doubles, singles success proved to be elusive. Moutet reached the quarterfinals of only four events and pushed further in just two, never making a final. In June, he made his junior Grand Slam debut when he lost to Lee Duck-hee of South Korea in the first round of the French Open. Later that month, he fell in the second round of Wimbledon qualifying to Hong Seong-chan.

=== 2015–2016: Shortened seasons ===
Moutet began to shift his focus to ITF Men's Circuit events in 2015, resulting in a shortened season of only three tournaments. His best results came at the AGL Loy Yang Traralgon Junior International in January, where he reached the third round in singles and quarterfinals in doubles, with Orlando Luz. Later that month, he made his Australian Open debut, losing in the first round in both singles and doubles. His final event of the year was the Trofeo Juan Carlos Ferrero in April, where he fell in the first round in singles and second round in doubles.

2016 also proved to be a shortened Junior season for Moutet. He began his season in May at the French Open, moving through two rounds before losing to countryman and eventual champion Geoffrey Blancaneaux in three sets. Moutet found singles success again in July when he competed at the European Junior Championships. Though unseeded, he received a bye in the first round before moving swiftly through to the semifinals, where he met Marvin Möller of Germany. Möller pushed Moutet to three sets, but Moutet came out on top. In the final, he faced Stefanos Tsitsipas. Tsitsipas won the first set in a tiebreak, saving two set points, and lead 5–3, 30–0 in the second set when Moutet, upset with the chair umpire, quit the match. Moutet then competed in the European Summer Cups, helping France win the title, before finishing his year at the US Open, where he lost in the third round.

=== 2017: Final junior year ===
Moutet started his 2017 season at the AGL Loy Yang Traralgon Junior International in January. Seeded sixth, he moved quickly through the first four rounds, dropping only twelve games en route to the semifinals, where he again met Möller. Moutet moved into his first final of the season after defeating Möller in straight sets. In the final, he faced 16th seeded Zsombor Piros, taking out the Hungarian to win his first tournament of the season. Partnering with Ergi Kirkin, he also reached the doubles semifinals, losing to Italian pair Francesco Forti and Mattia Frinzi. The Australian Open would also prove to be successful for Moutet. Seeded fifth in singles, he faced little trouble en route to the semifinals, where he again faced Piros. Unable to replicate his success in Traralgon, Piros, the eventual champion, came out on top, defeating Moutet.

Focusing on Pro Circuit events, Moutet did not return to junior competition until June, when he competed at the French Open. In the first round, he defeated Emil Ruusuvuori, whom he had previously defeated at the Australian Open, before falling to Alexey Zakharov of Russia in the second round.

July brought additional success for Moutet. After falling in the first round of the Nike Junior International Roehampton, he made a deep run at Wimbledon. As the top seed, he pushed through to the semifinals, defeating 11th seeded Jurij Rodionov of Austria in the quarterfinals before falling to unseeded Argentinian Axel Geller. After a successful Wimbledon, he then entered the European Junior Championships, where he was again the seeded first. On his way to the final, he exacted revenge on Zakharov in the semifinals, defeating him without losing a game. In the final, Moutet met Piros for the third and last time in 2017, again falling to him in straight sets.

Moutet's final junior level matches came at the European Summer Cups in August. Here he did not drop a set, winning three matches in singles and, with Matteo Martineau, three matches in doubles to help his home country lift the trophy. After the victory, Moutet announced that he would no longer play junior events, instead focusing his efforts exclusively at the professional level.

Moutet reached a career high of No. 7 in the ITF Combined Junior Rankings on 14 August 2017.

== Professional career ==
=== 2014: ATP qualifying debut, Futures events ===
Moutet began his professional career when he was given a wildcard into the qualifying event at the Moselle Open, where he won his first round match against Ukrainian Gleb Alekseenko in two sets. He then faced second-seeded Pierre-Hugues Herbert, who defeated him in straight sets. Moutet then played three consecutive Futures. Qualifying for each event, he reached the second round at both Dominican Republic F1 and F3 and the quarterfinals at Dominican Republic F2. Moutet finished the year ranked No. 1254.

=== 2015: First Futures final, French Open qualifying ===
The 2015 season started in Spain for Moutet. Competing in the Spain F5, he won two qualifying matches before advancing to the quarterfinals, defeating the second seed, Oriol Roca Batalla, in the first round.

At his next event, Italy F3, only the fourth Futures event of his career, Moutet reached his first final. En route, he toppled three seeded players: fifth-seeded Nicolas Reissig, second-seeded Omar Giacalone, and fourth-seeded Riccardo Sinicropi. Waiting for Moutet in the final was top-seeded Gianluca Naso. Moutet raced to a quick lead, winning the first set 6–0, but Naso found his footing and rebounded to take the next two sets and the title. Moutet saw action in two more Futures events in April.

In May, Moutet was granted a wildcard into his first Challenger event at Bordeaux, where he lost to fourth-seeded Robin Haase in the first round. He was then granted a wildcard into the qualifying draw of the French Open, where he lost Michael Berrer of Germany in the first round.

Following the French Open, Moutet played four additional Futures events to finish the year, winning only two main draw matches.

Moutet finished the year ranked No. 886.

=== 2016: Turning Pro, Two Futures titles ===
The season began in February with Moutet attempting to qualify for the Cherbourg Challenger. He won his first round match against third seed Lorenzo Giustino, but fell in the second round to Maxime Authom of Belgium.

Moutet saw action in three Futures events in March. At France F5, Moutet defeated three seeded players en route to the second final of his career, where he lost to Raymond Sarmiento of the United States in straight sets. Two weeks later, he attempted to qualify for the Saint-Brieuc Challenger, but fell in the second round to Edward Corrie.

From April to July, Moutet participated in seven Futures events in France, Croatia, and Italy, advancing to two quarterfinals.

Absent from play in August, he returned in September at the Ukraine F4 event. Seeded sixth, Moutet advanced to the semifinals after dropping only four games. In the semifinals, he faced top seed Lukas Mugevičius. After winning the first set in a tiebreak, Moutet sealed the win in quick fashion, taking the second set 6–0 to advance to the third final of his career. Facing seventh seed Leon Schutt in the final, Moutet wasted no time in capturing his first Futures title, taking the match in straight sets.

At his next event, Croatia F8, the unseeded Moutet took home the second title of his career. En route, Moutet defeated eighth-seeded Filipp Kekercheni in the first round, top-seeded Riccardo Bellotti in the semifinals, and fifth-seeded Nino Serdarusic in the final.

Two weeks later, Moutet was granted a wildcard into both the singles and doubles at the Brest Challenger. In singles, he advanced to the second round, where he lost to second seed Lukáš Lacko in straight sets. In doubles, partnering Grégoire Jacq, he advanced to the quarterfinals. The next week, Moutet competed at the Norway F2 event, advancing to the quarterfinals.

November brought the end of the season for Moutet. He competed at the Mouilleron-le-Captif Challenger as a wildcard, where he lost in the first round to Alex de Minaur. His final event was Egypt F33. Seeded sixth, he lost in three sets to Piotr Matuszewski.

Moutet finished the year ranked No. 529.

=== 2017: French Open doubles debut, Challenger title ===
The first event of the year was the Nouméa Challenger, where Moutet advanced to the second round in singles and lost in the first round in doubles. His next competition was the Canberra Challenger, again competing in both singles and doubles. Facing sixth seed Steve Darcis in the first round, Moutet was easily defeated, losing 6–1, 6–1. In doubles, he partnered Vijay Sundar Prashanth and advanced to the quarterfinals.

Moutet was given a wildcard into the qualifying of Montpellier in February, where he lost in the first round to second seed Vincent Millot 6–2, 6–2. He next competed at the Cherbourg Challenger. After coming through qualifying, Moutet advanced to the first Challenger quarterfinal of his career, losing to Kenny de Schepper in three sets.

France F5 in March was Moutet's next event. Seeded sixth, he advanced only to the second round. He nexted competed at France F6, losing in the first round in both singles and doubles.

Granted a wildcard, Moutet next competed at the Saint-Brieuc Challenger. After defeating third seed Norbert Gombos in the first round and fellow wildcard Rémi Boutillier in the second, Moutet faced James McGee in the quarterfinals. McGee took the first set easily, but Moutet fought back and eventually won the match 2–6, 7–6^{(9–7)}, 7–6^{(7–5)} to reach his first Challenger semifinal. Moutet's run ended in the semifinals, when he lost to eventual champion Egor Gerasimov, 6–4, 4–6, 3–6.

Moutet's next tournament was the Sophia Antipolis Challenger, where he lost in the first round to third seed Guillermo García López. He then competed at the Tunisia F5 Futures, where he lost in the second round.

May brought renewed success for Moutet. Competing at France F10, he moved swiftly through the draw to take his first title of the season, dropping just one set along the way. Next on Moutet's schedule was the Aix-en-Provence Challenger, where he was granted a wildcard. Facing qualifier Maxime Hamou in the first round, he fell in two sets. He then competed at the Bordeaux Challenger, where he advanced to the second round.

Moutet was granted wildcards for the men's singles qualifying and the men's doubles main draw at the French Open. In singles qualifying, he lost to Stefan Kozlov in the first round. Partnering with Constant Lestienne in the doubles, he advanced to the second round, where the pair was defeated by the eleventh seeds, Jean-Julien Rojer and Horia Tecău.

Next for Moutet was the Lyon Challenger. Granted a wildcard, he lost in the first round to Elias Ymer of Sweden. Moutet then competed at the Blois Challenger, where he lost in the first round after coming through qualifying.

In July, Moutet competed at the France F16 event, advancing to the semifinals before losing to Corentin Denolly in three sets.

Moutet next played at the Como Challenger. After coming through qualifying, he defeated sixth-seeded García López en route to his second Challenger semifinal of the season. He then competed in the Seville Challenger, where he again made the semifinals before losing to Íñigo Cervantes, 2–6, 2–6.

Moutet then went on a two-tournament win streak, taking home both the Spain F30 and Italy F32 titles without dropping a set. He continued his success at his next event, Italy F33, where he made a run to the final.

Moutet found the biggest success of the season at the Brest Challenger. Entered as a wildcard, Moutet again defeated Gombos in the first round, winning 4–6, 6–4, 6–1. He then defeated Tristan Lamasine in the second round, 6–4, 6–7^{(6–8)}, 6–3. In the quarterfinal, Moutet faced Gleb Sakharov, winning the match in straight sets. Advancing to another semifinal, he defeated Yannick Maden, 4–6, 7–6^{(7–2)}, 6–4, to advance to the first Challenger final of his career. Awaiting Moutet in the final was Stefanos Tsitsipas, whom he had not yet faced at the professional level. Eager to take his first Challenger title, Moutet won the match, 6–2, 7–6^{(10–8)}.

The next week, Moutet competed at the Eckental Challenger. After defeating sixth seed Lukáš Lacko in the first round and Yann Marti in the second, Moutet's run came to an end in the quarterfinals, where he lost to eventual champion Maximilian Marterer. His final event of the year was the Mouilleron-le-Captif Challenger, where he lost to seventh seed Alexander Bublik in the first round.

Moutet finished the year ranked No. 155.

=== 2018: ATP Tour and Grand Slam debuts ===
Moutet began his season at the Nouméa Challenger. Seeded 5th, he lost in the quarterfinals to the eventual champion Noah Rubin in three sets. The following week, he competed at the Canberra Challenger. Unseeded and unable to replicate the success of the previous week, Moutet lost in straight sets in the first round to another unseeded player, Nicolás Jarry of Chile.

On 15 January, Moutet made his debut in the singles main draw of an ATP World Tour tournament and a Grand Slam tournament at the Australian Open. As a wildcard entry, he faced Italian veteran Andreas Seppi in the first round of that tournament. Despite winning the first set, Moutet was unable to prevail, falling 6–3, 4–6, 2–6, 2–6. In early February, Moutet received a wildcard for the singles main draw at the Ecuador Open. He won the first ATP World Tour singles main draw match of his career at that tournament when he defeated Adrián Menéndez Maceiras in the first round. He upset 7th-seeded Ivo Karlović in the second round before losing to the Slovak qualifier Andrej Martin 3–6, 4–6 in the quarterfinals.

Moutet received a wildcard for the singles main draw of the French Open. He won the first Grand Slam singles main draw match of his career when he again defeated Ivo Karlović in straight sets. Moutet was the youngest competitor and one of six teenagers in the men's singles main draw of the 2018 French Open. 39 year-old Karlović, by contrast, was the oldest. Moutet lost his second round match to the eight seed David Goffin in straight sets.

=== 2019: French third and Wimbledon second round, top 100 ===
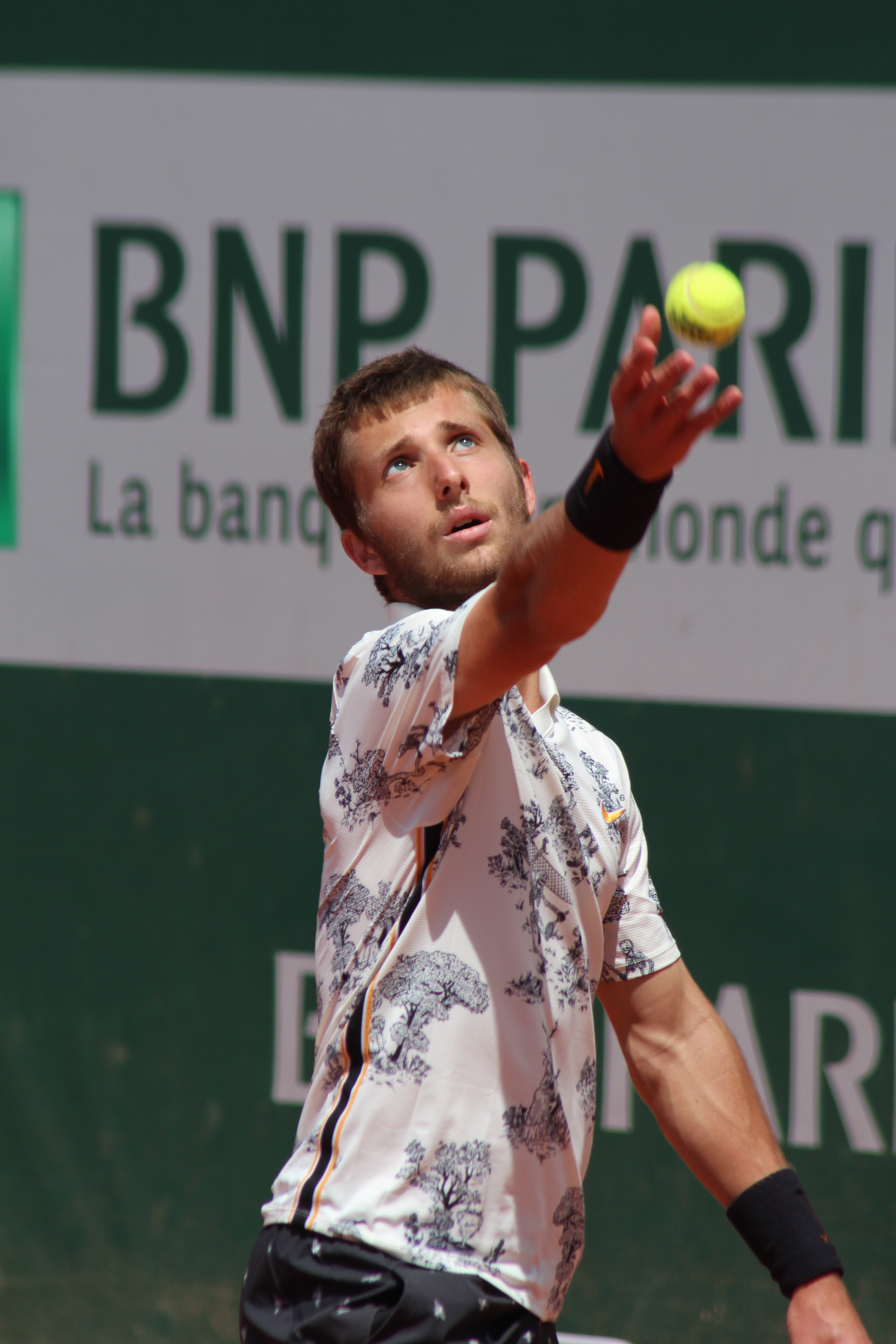
Corentin Moutet serving at the 2019 French Open.

At the French Open, Moutet (who entered the singles main draw as a wildcard) upset 19th-seed Guido Pella in the second round before losing to the unseeded Juan Ignacio Londero in five sets in the third round.

He won his fourth title at the 2019 Open Sopra Steria de Lyon and reached the top 100 on 17 June 2019.

As a qualifier, Moutet upset Grigor Dimitrov in the first round before losing to the 19th seed Félix Auger-Aliassime in the second round at Wimbledon.

=== 2020: ATP singles final, US Open third round ===
Moutet reached his first career ATP Tour singles final (where he lost to Andrey Rublev in straight sets) as a qualifier at the 2020 Qatar ExxonMobil Open, after defeating fourth-seeded Milos Raonic in the second round and top-seeded Stan Wawrinka in the semifinals.

Moutet then followed with a good result in his first clay-court tournament of the year in Córdoba, where he lost in the quarterfinals to Andrej Martin.

He enjoyed his joint-best showing in a Grand Slam tournament at the 2020 US Open by defeating 23rd seed Dan Evans in the second round before losing to 15th seed Félix Auger-Aliassime in the third round.

At the 2020 French Open Moutet lost to first time main draw qualifier at this Major, Italian Lorenzo Giustino 6–0, 6–7 (7), 6–7 (3), 6–2, 16–18 in the first round. The match was the second-longest in French Open history, lasting 6 hours, 5 minutes. It was Guistino's first tour-level win.

=== 2021: Career-high ranking in top 70 ===
In February, Moutet reached the semifinals at the 2021 Murray River Open lead-up tournament to the Australian Open in Melbourne defeating the No. 2 seeded Grigor Dimitrov in the quarterfinals before losing to Canadian No. 3 seeded Félix Auger-Aliassime in the semifinals. The following week, he finally won his first round match at the Australian Open for the first time at the 2021 edition, defeating Australian player John Millman in five sets. He did not progress further at that tournament, losing his second round match to Canadian no. 14 seed Milos Raonic in four sets.

At the 2021 Estoril Open in April, Moutet defeated another Canadian, the top seeded wildcard Denis Shapovalov, in the second round, before losing to Albert Ramos Viñolas in the quarterfinals. Moutet reached a career-high ATP singles ranking of No. 67 on 3 May 2021. Moutet was the highest ranked player still without a top 10 win, (replaced by South Korea's Kwon Soon-woo on 14 June), the highest-ranked player whom he had defeated in his career being the then world No. 13 David Goffin at the 2021 Halle Open.

=== 2022: US Open fourth round, FFT expulsion, top 60 debut ===
At the Adelaide International 1 tournament on 5 January 2022, Moutet was disqualified for swearing at the chair umpire immediately after he had lost the second set of his second-round match against Laslo Đere. As of result of Moutet's disqualification, Đere was awarded a walkover 4–6, 7–5 win and a passage into the quarterfinals. Moutet enjoyed a fine run in his next tournament (the Adelaide International 2), winning two qualifying and three main draw matches to reach the semifinals, where he was defeated by his unseeded countryman Arthur Rinderknech 1–6, 3–6.

At the 2022 Australian Open Moutet defeated wildcard and compatriot Lucas Pouille in the first round before losing to Sebastian Korda in the second round in a five-set match that ended in a super tiebreak in the fifth set.

In May, Moutet was awarded a wildcard into the singles main draw of the 2022 French Open, where he defeated Stanislas Wawrinka in the first round before losing to Rafael Nadal in the second round.

Ranked world No. 112 at the US Open, Moutet entered the singles main draw as a lucky loser. In the first round, he defeated Stanislas Wawrinka (who retired after losing the first two sets) to register a 3-0 head-to-head record against the 2016 US Open champion. Next he defeated 21st seed Botic van de Zandschulp to move onto the singles third round for the second time (the first was in 2020) at this Major. He went one step further defeating Pedro Cachin to move into a Grand Slam fourth round for the first time in his career and making history by becoming the first male lucky loser to reach the fourth round at this Grand Slam and the first to do so at any Grand Slam since Stéphane Robert at the 2014 Australian Open. He lost his fourth round match to Casper Ruud in four sets. As a result of his good performance at the US Open, he moved close to 30 places up the ATP singles rankings to world No. 84 on 12 September 2022.

In September, he won the ATP Challenger Tour Szczecin Open singles title, defeating Dennis Novak in the final. He reached a career-high ATP singles rankings of world No. 64 on 19 September 2022.

On October 4, Moutet was fined 10,000 euros by the ATP following his scuffle on the court with Adrian Andreev immediately after Moutet lost his second-round match against Andreev at the Open d'Orléans. The umpire had to intervene to separate the players.

On November 1, right after his first round match win against Borna Ćorić at the 2022 Rolex Paris Masters, he was expelled from the Federation of French Tennis (FFT) due to repeated bad behavior. He won his second round match defeating world No. 13 and 12th seed Cameron Norrie a match that finished at 3:03 AM, the latest ever match finish in Paris Bercy. He lost to Stefanos Tsitsipas in straight sets. As a result, he moved to a new career-high ranking of world No. 51 on 7 November 2022.

=== 2023: Out of top 100 ===
As a result of break due to a wrist surgery in January 2023, and multiple first round losses, including at the 2023 US Open, Moutet dropped out of the Top 100 in September 2023. In November, he won his first Challenger title in more than a year at the 2023 HPP Open in Helsinki, defeating Sumit Nagal in the final.

=== 2024: Major and Masters fourth round, Olympics debut ===
Moutet reached the semifinals at the 2024 Chile Open in Santiago as a qualifier with an upset over top seed and defending champion Nicolás Jarry, before losing to fourth seed Alejandro Tabilo. Moutet reached the fourth round at the 2024 French Open for the first time in his career defeating 16th seed Nicolás Jarry, Alexander Shevchenko and Sebastian Ofner all in four sets. Moutet lost to second seed Jannik Sinner.

In July 2024, at the Paris Olympics, Moutet defeated Sumit Nagal in the first round and then received a walkover against Jan-Lennard Struff. His run ended in the third round when he was defeated by ninth seed Tommy Paul in straight sets. In November, Moutet reached the semifinals at the 2024 Moselle Open with wins over Sumit Nagal by retirement and seventh seed Jan-Lennard Struff in three sets, followed by a walkover from top seed Andrey Rublev. He lost to Cameron Norrie in straight sets.

=== 2025-2026: First Top 10 wins, two ATP finals, top 30 ===
At the 2025 Italian Open Moutet defeated ninth seed Holger Rune in the third round to reach his first fourth round at a Masters event. It was the fourth longest match at the tournament (lasting 3 hours and 45 minutes), since 1991 when the ATP Tour began recording match times. It was Moutet's first top 10 win.

At the 2025 Queen's Club Championships, Moutet defeated third seed Taylor Fritz in the first round, his second top 10 win. The following week, at the Mallorca Open, Moutet reached his second career final on the ATP Tour, more than five years after his first final. He defeated third seed Alex Michelsen in the semifinal but lost to Tallon Griekspoor in the final.

In July, at the Washington Open, he entered the main draw as a lucky loser directly in the second round. In the third round he defeated former champion Dan Evans. He defeated Daniil Medvedev in the quarterfinals to reach his first ATP 500 career semifinal. As a result he reached the top 50 for the first time at a new career high singles ranking of world No. 46 on 28 July 2025. In the semifinals, he lost to Alex de Minaur in straight sets.

Moutet reached the second round of the 2026 Queen's Club Championships, losing to Alejandro Davidovich Fokina, but was fined almost the entirety of his prize money for "unsportsmanlike behaviour" after an expletive-laden television interview following his first round victory over Giovanni Mpetshi Perricard.

== Playing style ==
Moutet's playing style is a unique blend of adaptability and creativity, setting him apart on the ATP tour. One of the most notable aspects of his game is his backhand. Initially a two-handed player, Moutet was forced to adapt to a one-handed backhand after suffering a right wrist injury. Despite the challenges, he developed proficiency with the one-handed stroke, and now can effectively play both one-handed and two-handed backhands depending on the situation.

In addition to his versatile backhand, Moutet is also known for his frequent use of the underarm serve, a rare tactic in professional tennis. After his wrist injury, he found that the underarm serve was more effective than his traditional serve, and contemplated using it as his primary serve. This unconventional approach, combined with his flair for drop shots and volleys, often catches opponents off guard and adds an element of unpredictability to his matches.

== Personal life ==
Moutet began playing tennis at the age of three, when he started playing with his father. As of 2013, his father owned a restaurant in Paris.

He idolised Rafael Nadal growing up, and has appeared in numerous video sessions for TopCourt, a popular tennis tutorial website.

In 2020, Moutet dropped his debut hip-hop album, Écorché, and he has released several new songs since then, including a track with fellow tennis player Denis Shapovalov.

== Performance timeline ==
Key
W	F	SF	QF	#R	RR	Q#	DNQ	A	NH

(W) winner; (F) finalist; (SF) semifinalist; (QF) quarterfinalist; (#R) rounds 4, 3, 2, 1; (RR) round-robin stage; (Q#) qualification round; (DNQ) did not qualify; (A) absent; (NH) not held; (SR) strike rate (events won / competed); (W–L) win–loss record.
To avoid confusion and double counting, these charts are updated at the conclusion of a tournament or when the player's participation has ended.

=== Singles ===
Tournament	2018	2019	2020	2021	2022	2023	2024	2025	2026	SR	W–L	Win%
Grand Slam tournaments
Australian Open	1R	Q1	1R	2R	2R	2R	A	3R	3R	0 / 7	7–7	45%
French Open	2R	3R	1R	1R	2R	2R	4R	2R	1R	0 / 9	9–9	50%
Wimbledon	A	2R	NH	1R	A	2R	A	2R	1R	0 / 5	3–5	38%
US Open	1R	1R	3R	2R	4R	1R	1R	1R		0 / 8	6–8	43%
Win–loss	1–3	3–3	2–3	2–4	5–3	3–4	3–2	4–4	2–3	0 / 29	25–29	46%
ATP Masters 1000
Indian Wells Open	A	A	NH	A	A	A	A	2R	2R	0 / 2	1–2	33%
Miami Open	A	A	NH	A	A	A	A	2R	3R	0 / 2	2–2	50%
Monte-Carlo Masters	A	A	NH	Q1	A	A	1R	1R	2R	0 / 3	1–3	25%
Madrid Open	A	A	NH	A	A	1R	1R	1R	2R	0 / 4	0–4	0%
Italian Open	A	A	Q3	Q2	A	1R	2R	4R	2R	0 / 4	4–4	50%
Canadian Open	A	A	NH	A	A	Q2	A	2R	2R	0 / 2	2–2	50%
Cincinnati Open	A	A	A	1R	A	1R	1R	2R		0 / 4	1–4	20%
Shanghai Masters	A	A	NH			1R	1R	2R		0 / 3	0–3	0%
Paris Masters	Q1	2R	2R	A	3R	A	1R	2R		0 / 5	5–4	57%
Win–loss	0–0	1–1	1–0	0–1	2–1	0–4	1–6	8–9	3–6	0 / 28	16–28	36%

== ATP Tour finals ==
=== Singles: 3 (3 runner-ups) ===
Legend Grand Slam (0–0) ATP 1000 (0–0) ATP 500 (0–0) ATP 250 (0–3)	Finals by surface Hard (0–2) Clay (0–0) Grass (0–1)	Finals by setting Outdoor (0–2) Indoor (0–1)

Result	W–L	Date	Tournament	Tier	Surface	Opponent	Score
Loss	0–1	Jan 2020	Qatar Open, Qatar	ATP 250	Hard	(Russia) Andrey Rublev	2–6, 6–7^{(3–7)}
Loss	0–2	Jun 2025	Mallorca Championships, Spain	ATP 250	Grass	(Netherlands) Tallon Griekspoor	5–7, 6–7^{(3–7)}
Loss	0–3	Oct 2025	Almaty Open, Kazakhstan	ATP 250	Hard (i)	Daniil Medvedev	5–7, 6–4, 3–6

== ATP Challenger Tour finals ==
=== Singles: 9 (7 titles, 2 runner-ups) ===
Legend ATP Challenger Tour (7–2)	Finals by surface Hard (4–0) Clay (3–2)

Result	W–L	Date	Tournament	Tier	Surface	Opponent	Score
Win	1–0	Oct 2017	Brest Challenger, France	Challenger	Hard (i)	(Greece) Stefanos Tsitsipas	6–2, 7–6^{(10–8)}
Loss	1–1	Jul 2018	Båstad Challenger, Sweden	Challenger	Clay	(Spain) Pedro Martínez	6–7^{(5–7)}, 4–6
Win	2–1	Sep 2018	Istanbul Challenger, Turkey	Challenger	Hard	(France) Quentin Halys	6–3, 6–4
Win	3–1	Feb 2019	Chennai Open, India	Challenger	Hard	(Australia) Andrew Harris	6–3, 6–3
Loss	3–2	May 2019	Samarkand Challenger, Uzbekistan	Challenger	Clay	(Brazil) João Menezes	6–7^{(2–7)}, 6–7^{(7–9)}
Win	4–2	Jun 2019	Open de Lyon, France	Challenger	Clay	(Sweden) Elias Ymer	6–4, 6–4
Win	5–2	Jun 2022	Open de Lyon, France (2)	Challenger	Clay	(Argentina) Pedro Cachín	6–4, 6–4
Win	6–2	Sep 2022	Szczecin Open, Poland	Challenger	Clay	(Austria) Dennis Novak	6–2, 6–7^{(5–7)}, 6–4
Win	7–2	Nov 2023	HPP Open, Finland	Challenger	Hard (i)	(India) Sumit Nagal	6–3, 3–6, 6–2

== ITF Futures finals ==
=== Singles: 8 (5 titles, 3 runner-ups) ===
Legend ITF Futures Tour (5–3)	Finals by surface Hard (0–1) Clay (5–2)

Result	W–L	Date	Tournament	Tier	Surface	Opponent	Score
Loss	0–1	Apr 2015	Italy F3, Santa Margherita di Pula	Futures	Clay	(Italy) Gianluca Naso	6–0, 4–6, 4–6
Loss	0–2	Mar 2016	France F5, Toulouse-Balma	Futures	Hard (i)	(United States) Raymond Sarmiento	4–6, 4–6
Win	1–2	Sep 2016	Ukraine F4, Cherkasy	Futures	Clay	(Germany) Leon Schütt	6–1, 6–3
Win	2–2	Oct 2016	Croatia F8, Solin	Futures	Clay	(Croatia) Nino Serdarušić	6–2, 7–6^{(7–1)}
Win	3–2	May 2017	France F10, Grasse	Futures	Clay	(France) Alexandre Müller	6–4, 6–3
Win	4–2	Sep 2017	Spain F30, Madrid	Futures	Clay (i)	(Spain) Guillermo Olaso	6–4, 6–1
Win	5–2	Oct 2017	Italy F32, Santa Margherita di Pula	Futures	Clay	(Italy) Gianluca di Nicola	6–1, 6–0
Loss	5–3	Oct 2017	Italy F33, Santa Margherita di Pula	Futures	Clay	(Italy) Andrea Pellegrino	5–7, 6–2, 3–6

== Exhibition matches ==
=== Singles ===
Result	Date	Tournament	Surface	Opponent	Score
Win	May 2021	Ultimate Tennis Showdown, Sophia Antipolis, France	Clay	(United States) Taylor Fritz	12–14, 15–11, 13–12, 16–8

== Wins against Top 10 players ==
- Moutet has a 2–17 (10.53%) record against players who were, at the time the match was played, ranked in the top 10.

Season	2025	Total
Wins	2	2

#	Player	Rk	Event	Surface	Rd	Score	Rk	Ref
2025
1.	(Denmark) Holger Rune	10	Italian Open, Italy	Clay	3R	7–5, 5–7, 7–6^{(7–4)}	83	
2.	(United States) Taylor Fritz	4	Queen's Club, United Kingdom	Grass	1R	6–7^{(5–7)}, 7–6^{(9–7)}, 7–5	89	

- Key: (Rk) first use, opponent rank; (Rd) round; (Rk) 2nd use, player rank; (Ref) reference; (F) final; (SF) semifinal; (QF) quarterfinal; (#R) rounds 4, 3, 2, 1; (RR) round-robin stage; (Q#) qualifying rounds or stages (3), 2, 1.

*As of 25 October 2025
