= 2023 Open Nouvelle-Calédonie – Doubles =

Doubles
- 2023 Open Nouvelle-Calédonie

Final
- Champions: (Northern Mariana Islands) Colin Sinclair (New Zealand) Rubin Statham
- Runners-up: (Japan) Toshihide Matsui (Japan) Kaito Uesugi
- Score: 6–4, 6–3

Events
Singles	Doubles
- Open Nouvelle-Calédonie

Andrea Pellegrino and Mario Vilella Martínez were the defending champions but chose not to defend their title.

Colin Sinclair and Rubin Statham won the title after defeating Toshihide Matsui and Kaito Uesugi 6–4, 6–3 in the final.

== Seeds ==
1. (Japan) Toshihide Matsui / (Japan) Kaito Uesugi (final)
2. (France) Geoffrey Blancaneaux / (Tunisia) Skander Mansouri (quarterfinals)
3. (Australia) Calum Puttergill / (Australia) Brandon Walkin (quarterfinals)
4. (Australia) Thomas Fancutt / (New Zealand) Ajeet Rai (semifinals, withdrew)

== Draw ==
Key

- Q = Qualifier
- WC = Wild card
- LL = Lucky loser
- Alt = Alternate
- ITF = ITF entry
- PR = Protected ranking
- SR = Special ranking
- SE = Special exempt
- JE = Junior exempt
- JR = Junior Accelerator Programme entrant
- CO = College Accelerator Programme entrant
- NG = Next Gen Accelerator Program entrant
- w/o = Walkover
- r = Retired
- d = Defaulted

First round
(South Korea) S-c Hong (Japan) Daisuke Sumizawa	6	6
(Australia) Ja Delaney (Australia) B Ellis	4	0
3	(Australia) C Puttergill (Australia) B Walkin	7^{7}	6
(Bosnia and Herzegovina) D Džumhur (Croatia) N Serdarušić	6^{1}	0
(Australia) Je Delaney (Japan) Yuichiro Inui	2	4
(United States) Preston Brown (Australia) A Taylor	6	6
WC	(Australia) Matthew Harper (Australia) Mitchell Harper	w/o
(Chile) T Barrios Vera (Chile) C Garín
WC	(France) M Chazal (France) N N'Godrela	2	5
4	(Australia) T Fancutt (New Zealand) A Rai	6	7
(Italy) R Bonadio (Italy) R Marcora	0	7^{7}	[5]
(Northern Mariana Islands) C Sinclair (New Zealand) R Statham	6	6^{2}	[10]

Quarterfinals
1	(Japan) T Matsui (Japan) K Uesugi	3	6	[10]
(South Korea) S-c Hong (Japan) D Sumizawa	6	4	[6]
3	(Australia) C Puttergill (Australia) B Walkin	7^{7}	4	[7]
(United States) P Brown (Australia) A Taylor	6^{3}	6	[10]
WC	(Australia) Ma Harper (Australia) Mi Harper	4	4
4	(Australia) T Fancutt (New Zealand) A Rai	6	6
(Northern Mariana Islands) C Sinclair (New Zealand) R Statham	6	6
2	(France) G Blancaneaux (Tunisia) S Mansouri	3	3

Semifinals
1	(Japan) T Matsui (Japan) K Uesugi	6	6
(United States) P Brown (Australia) A Taylor	3	2
4	(Australia) T Fancutt (New Zealand) A Rai
(Northern Mariana Islands) C Sinclair (New Zealand) R Statham	w/o

Final
1	(Japan) T Matsui (Japan) K Uesugi	4	3
(Northern Mariana Islands) C Sinclair (New Zealand) R Statham	6	6
