= Open Nouvelle-Calédonie =

- 2026 BNC Tennis Open

ATP Challenger Tour
- Event name: BNC Tennis Open (2025-), Open SIFA Nouvelle-Calédonie (2023-2024)
- Editions: 21
- Location: Nouméa, New Caledonia
- Venue: Complexe Tennistique Marie-Louise Lhuillier
- Category: ATP Challenger Tour (-2020, 2026-), Challenger 100 (2023-2025)
- Surface: Hard
- Draw: 32S/8Q/16D
- Prize money: US$107,000 (2026), 133,250 (2025)
- Website: Official Website

Current champions (2026)
- Singles: (France) Arthur Géa
- Doubles: (Japan) Yusuke Kusuhara (Japan) Shunsuke Nakagawa

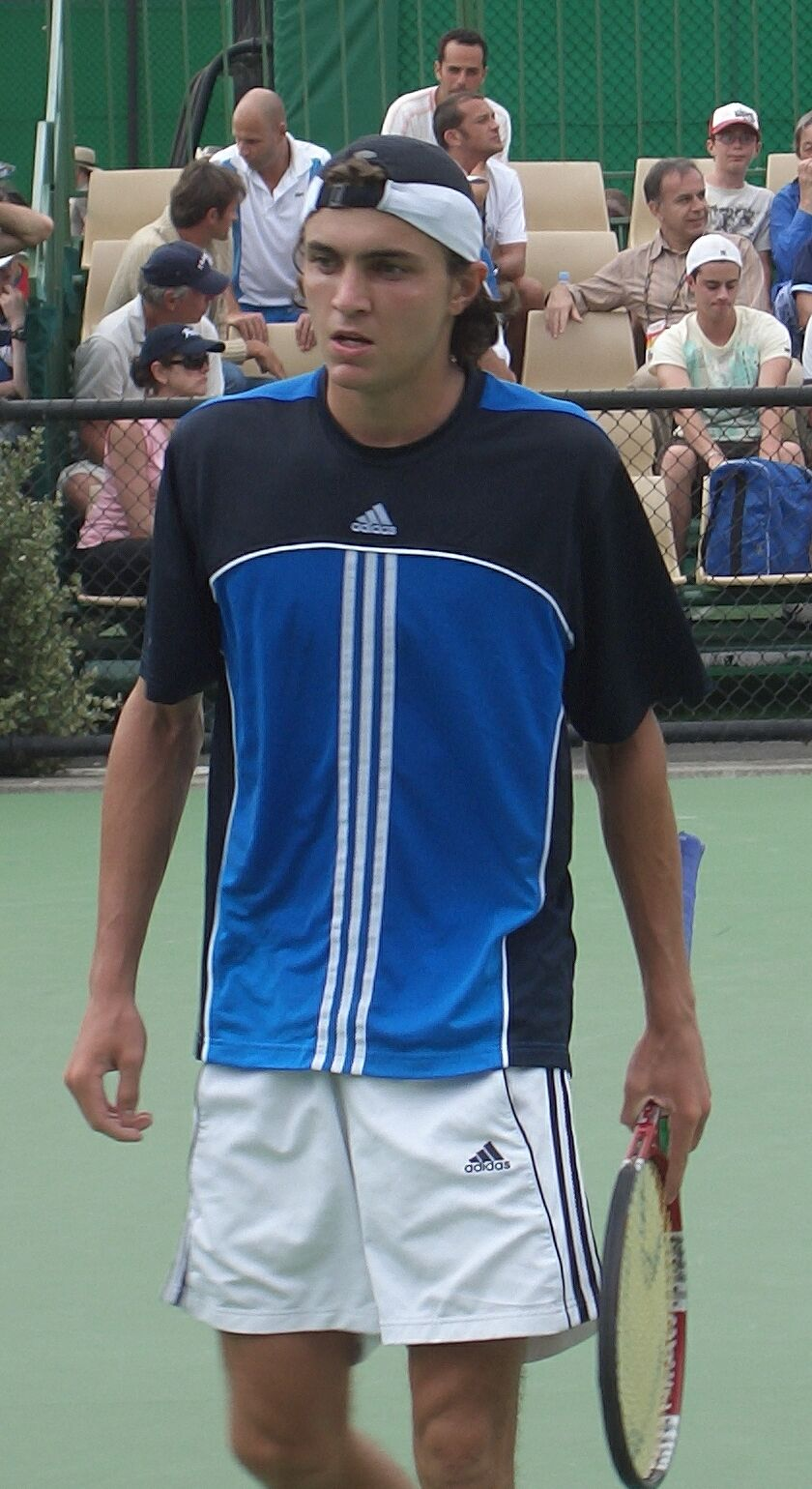
Eventual top tenner Gilles Simon won two back-to-back singles titles at the event in 2005 and 2006

The BNC Tennis Open, also known as the BNC Open Nouvelle-Calédonie, (formerly known as Open SIFA and Internationaux/BNP Paribas de Nouvelle-Calédonie) is a professional tennis tournament played on outdoor hardcourts. It is currently part of the ATP Challenger Tour. It has been held annually in Nouméa, New Caledonia (starting with $37,500 of prize money in 2004).

== Past finals ==
=== Singles ===
Year	Champion	Runner-up	Score
2004	(Argentina) Guillermo Cañas	(Australia) Todd Reid	6–4, 6–3
2005	(France) Gilles Simon	(Germany) Björn Phau	6–3, 6–0
2006	(France) Gilles Simon (2)	(South Africa) Rik de Voest	6–2, 5–7, 6–2
2007	(United States) Michael Russell	(France) David Guez	6–0, 6–1
2008	(Italy) Flavio Cipolla	(Switzerland) Stéphane Bohli	6–4, 7–5
2009	(United States) Brendan Evans	(Germany) Florian Mayer	4–6, 6–3, 6–4
2010	(Germany) Florian Mayer	(Italy) Flavio Cipolla	6–3, 6–0
2011	(France) Vincent Millot	(Luxembourg) Gilles Müller	7–6^{(8–6)}, 2–6, 6–4
2012	(France) Jérémy Chardy	(Spain) Adrián Menéndez Maceiras	6–4, 6–3
2013	(France) Adrian Mannarino	(Slovakia) Andrej Martin	6–4, 6–3
2014	(Colombia) Alejandro Falla	(Canada) Steven Diez	6–2, 6–2
2015	(Belgium) Steve Darcis	(Spain) Adrián Menéndez Maceiras	6–3, 6–2
2016	(France) Adrian Mannarino (2)	(Colombia) Alejandro Falla	5–7, 6–2, 6–2
2017	(France) Adrian Mannarino (3)	(Serbia) Nikola Milojević	6–3, 7–5
2018	(United States) Noah Rubin	(United States) Taylor Fritz	7–5, 6–4
2019	(Sweden) Mikael Ymer	(United States) Noah Rubin	6–3, 6–3
2020	(United States) J. J. Wolf	(Japan) Yūichi Sugita	6–2, 6–2
2021–22	Not held		
2023	(Italy) Raúl Brancaccio	(France) Laurent Lokoli	4–6, 7–5, 6–2
2024	(France) Arthur Cazaux	(France) Enzo Couacaud	6–1, 6–1
2025	(Japan) Shintaro Mochizuki	(Australia) Moerani Bouzige	6–1, 6–3
2026	(France) Arthur Géa	(Austria) Jurij Rodionov	6–3, 4–6, 7–5

=== Doubles ===
Year	Champions	Runners-up	Score
2004	(Australia) Stephen Huss (Australia) Ashley Fisher	(Australia) Luke Bourgeois (Australia) Vince Mellino	3–6, 6–4, 6–4
2005	(Australia) Stephen Huss (2) (South Africa) Wesley Moodie	(France) Jérôme Golmard (Israel) Harel Levy	6–3, 6–0
2006	(United States) Alex Bogomolov (United States) Todd Widom	(Germany) Lars Burgsmüller (Germany) Denis Gremelmayr	3–6, 6–2, [10–6]
2007	(United States) Alex Kuznetsov (United States) Phillip Simmonds	(France) Thierry Ascione (France) Édouard Roger-Vasselin	7–6^{(7–5)}, 6–3
2008	(Italy) Flavio Cipolla (Italy) Simone Vagnozzi	(Czech Republic) Jan Mertl (Austria) Martin Slanar	6–4, 6–4
2009	Play Cancelled Due To Rain		
2010	(France) Édouard Roger-Vasselin (France) Nicolas Devilder	(Italy) Flavio Cipolla (Italy) Simone Vagnozzi	5–7, 6–2, [10–6]
2011	(Germany) Dominik Meffert (Denmark) Frederik Nielsen	(Italy) Flavio Cipolla (Italy) Simone Vagnozzi	7–6^{(7–4)}, 5–7, [10–5]
2012	(Thailand) Sanchai Ratiwatana (Thailand) Sonchat Ratiwatana	(France) Axel Michon (France) Guillaume Rufin	6–0, 6–4
2013	(Australia) Samuel Groth (Japan) Toshihide Matsui	(New Zealand) Artem Sitak (New Zealand) Jose Statham	7–6^{(8–6)}, 1–6, [10–4]
2014	(United States) Austin Krajicek (United States) Tennys Sandgren	(Croatia) Ante Pavić (Slovenia) Blaž Rola	7–6^{(7–4)}, 6–3
2015	(United States) Austin Krajicek (2) (United States) Tennys Sandgren (2)	(United States) Jarmere Jenkins (United States) Bradley Klahn	7–6^{(7–2)}, 6–7^{(5–7)}, [10–5]
2016	(France) Julien Benneteau (France) Édouard Roger-Vasselin	(France) Grégoire Barrère (France) Tristan Lamasine	7–6^{(7–4)}, 3–6, [10–5]
2017	(France) Quentin Halys (France) Tristan Lamasine	(Spain) Adrián Menéndez Maceiras (Italy) Stefano Napolitano	7–6^{(11–9)}, 6–1
2018	(France) Hugo Nys (Germany) Tim Pütz	(Colombia) Alejandro González (Spain) Jaume Munar	6–2, 6–2
2019	(Germany) Dustin Brown (United States) Donald Young	(Sweden) André Göransson (Netherlands) Sem Verbeek	7–5, 6–4
2020	(Italy) Andrea Pellegrino (Spain) Mario Vilella Martínez	(Switzerland) Luca Margaroli (Italy) Andrea Vavassori	7–6^{(7–1)}, 3–6, [12–10]
2021–22	Not held		
2023	(Northern Mariana Islands) Colin Sinclair (New Zealand) Rubin Statham	(Japan) Toshihide Matsui (Japan) Kaito Uesugi	6–4, 6–3
2024	(Northern Mariana Islands) Colin Sinclair (2) (New Zealand) Rubin Statham (2)	(Japan) Toshihide Matsui (Australia) Calum Puttergill	7–5, 6–2
2025	(Australia) Blake Bayldon (Northern Mariana Islands) Colin Sinclair (3)	(Japan) Ryuki Matsuda (Japan) Ryotaro Taguchi	6–3, 7–5
2026	(Japan) Yusuke Kusuhara (Japan) Shunsuke Nakagawa	(Australia) Jake Delaney (Australia) Calum Puttergill	7–5, 6–3
