= Nicolas N'Godrela =

New Caledonian tennis player

- Country (sports): New Caledonia; France
- Born: 6 October 1984 (age 41) New Caledonia
- Plays: Right handed
- Prize money: $8,780

Singles
- Highest ranking: No. 1024 (14 April 2008)

Doubles
- Highest ranking: No. 1119 (27 July 2015)

Nicolas N'Godrela (born 6 October 1984) is a New Caledonian tennis player. He won the men’s singles gold in 2011 Pacific Games, and bronze in the doubles. He also won the Men's singles and Men's doubles gold medal at the 2015 Pacific Games. Apart from that, he was also part of the New Caledonian Tennis Team which won Gold at the 2015 Pacific Games Men's Team Event.
