= Colin Sinclair (tennis) =

Northern Mariana Islander tennis player (1994)

- Country (sports): Northern Mariana Islands (2018–); United States (2013–2017); Australia (–2013); Pacific Oceania (Davis Cup tournaments)
- Residence: Brisbane, Australia
- Born: 19 December 1994 (age 31) Saipan, Northern Mariana Islands
- Height: 6 ft 2 in (1.88 m)
- Plays: Right-handed (two-handed backhand)
- College: Cornell University
- Coach: Jeff Race, Ian Malpass, Silviu Tanasoiu
- Prize money: US $179,755

Singles
- Career record: 1-2
- Career titles: 0
- Highest ranking: No. 340 (18 September 2023)
- Current ranking: No. 481 (19 October 2026)

Doubles
- Career record: 1-1
- Career titles: 0
- Highest ranking: No. 200 (10 April 2023)
- Current ranking: No. 437 (19 October 2026)

Team competitions
- Davis Cup: 18–5
Medal record
Men's tennis
Representing Northern Mariana Islands
Pacific Games
Gold medal – first place	2019 Samoa	Men's singles
Gold medal – first place	2019 Samoa	Mixed doubles
Gold medal – first place	2019 Samoa	Men's Team
Silver medal – second place	2019 Samoa	Men's doubles
- Last updated on: 21 August 2026.

Colin Sinclair (born December 19, 1994) is an American tennis player representing the Northern Mariana Islands. He achieved a career best singles ranking of world No. 340 on 18 September 2023 and a doubles ranking of No. 200 on 10 April 2023.

Sinclair has won four ATP Challenger and eight ITF Tour doubles titles. Additionally, he has won three singles ITF titles. He represents the Northern Mariana Islands in Davis Cup as part of the Pacific Oceania team since 2017 and has a career record of 18–5 (13–3 in singles, 5–2 in doubles) in the competition. On 23 September 2026 he lost to rank 1764 Yang Zijang.

== ATP Challenger and ITF Tour finals ==
=== Singles: 15 (5–10) ===
Legend ATP Challenger Tour (0–0) ITF Futures/World Tennis Tour (5–10)	Finals by surface Hard (2–7) Clay (2–2) Grass (1–1)

Result	W–L	Date	Tournament	Tier	Surface	Opponent	Score
Loss	0–1	Aug 2018	Belgium F9, Huy	Futures	Clay	(Germany) Jan Choinski	6–3, 6–7^{(0–7)}, 3–6
Loss	0–2	Sep 2018	Belgium F10, Damme	Futures	Clay	(Belgium) Michael Geerts	3–6, 3–6
Loss	0–3	Sep 2018	Tunisia F31, Monastir	Futures	Hard	(France) Gabriel Petit	6–7^{(5–7)}, 6–7^{(4–7)}
Loss	0–4	Oct 2018	Australia F7, Brisbane	Futures	Hard	(United Kingdom) Evan Hoyt	4–6, 6–7^{(5–7)}
Loss	0–5	Oct 2018	Australia F8, Toowoomba	Futures	Hard	(Australia) Maverick Banes	4–6, 2–6
Win	1–5	Feb 2019	M15 Claremont, United States	World Tennis Tour	Hard	(France) Lucas Poullain	6–3, 7–6^{(7–3)}
Loss	1–6	Nov 2019	M15 Cancún, Mexico	World Tennis Tour	Hard	(Brazil) João Lucas Reis da Silva	2–6, 4–6
Win	2–6	Nov 2021	M15 Guatemala City, Guatemala	World Tennis Tour	Hard	(Italy) Marco Brugnerotto	6–1, 5–7, 6–4
Loss	2–7	May 2022	M15 Cairo, Egypt	World Tennis Tour	Clay	(Australia) Li Tu	4–6, 6–3, 3–6
Loss	2–8	Oct 2022	M25 Cairns, Australia	World Tennis Tour	Hard	(Australia) Alex Bolt	3–6, 2–6
Win	3–8	Jun 2023	M15 Rancho Santa Fe, USA	World Tennis Tour	Hard	(France) Jaimee Floyd Angele	6–3, 6–2
Loss	3–9	Sep 2024	M15 Hong Kong, Hong Kong	World Tennis Tour	Hard	(Luxembourg) Chris Rodesch	4–6, 6–7^{(3–7)}
Win	4–9	Mar 2026	M15 Wodonga, Australia	World Tennis Tour	Grass	(Australia) Cruz Hewitt	6–3, 6–2
Loss	4–10	Mar 2026	M15 Swan Hill, Australia	World Tennis Tour	Grass	(Australia) Pavle Marinkov	6–7^{(2–7)}, 2–6
Win	5–10	Apr 2026	M25 Anning, China	World Tennis Tour	Clay	(Poland) Filip Peliwo	6–3, 6–0

=== Doubles: 19 (12–7) ===
Legend ATP Challenger Tour (4–0) ITF Tour (8–7)	Finals by surface Hard (7–3) Clay (5–4) Grass (0–0)

Result	W–L	Date	Tournament	Tier	Surface	Partner	Opponents	Score
Win	1–0	Aug 2017	Belgium F8, Eupen	Futures	Clay	(United Kingdom) Charles Broom	(Germany) Tom Schonenberg (Netherlands) Colin Van Beem	4–6, 6–1, [10–5]
Loss	1–1	Aug 2018	Belgium F9, Huy	Futures	Clay	(United States) Luke Jacob Gamble	(France) Dan Added (Belgium) Romain Barbosa	4–6, 5–7
Loss	1–2	Mar 2021	M15 Monastir, Tunisia	World Tennis Tour	Hard	(Romania) Vladislav Melnic	(Italy) Samuele Pieri (Italy) Daniele Capecchi	7–6^{(8–6)}, 4–6, [4–10]
Win	2–2	Mar 2021	M15 Monastir, Tunisia	World Tennis Tour	Hard	(Romania) Vladislav Melnic	(Japan) Kazuma Kawachi (United States) Evan Zhu	6–3, 4–6, [10–6]
Loss	2–3	Sep 2021	M25 Říčany, Czech Republic	World Tennis Tour	Clay	(Bulgaria) Alexander Donski	(United States) Toby Alex Kodat (Czech Republic) Adam Pavlásek	3–6, 5–7
Loss	2–4	Sep 2021	M25 Eupen, Belgium	World Tennis Tour	Clay	(Belgium) Benjamin Dhoe	(Germany) Niklas Schell (Germany) Kai Wehnelt	6–7^{(3–7)}, 3–6
Loss	2–5	Oct 2021	M15 Tallahassee, United States	World Tennis Tour	Hard	(Australia) Thomas Fancutt	(Canada) Liam Draxl (United States) John McNally	2–6, 3–6
Loss	2–6	Feb 2022	M15 Oberhaching, Germany	World Tennis Tour	Hard	(Israel) Edan Leshem	(Czech Republic) Petr Nouza (Italy) Giovanni Oradini	6–3, 3–6, [11–13]
Loss	2–7	Apr 2022	M15 Cairo, Egypt	World Tennis Tour	Clay	(Philippines) Francis Casey Alcantara	(Argentina) Lorenzo Joaquin Rodriguez; Ilya Rudiukov	5–7, 4–6
Win	3–7	May 2022	M25 Cairo, Egypt	World Tennis Tour	Clay	(Philippines) Francis Casey Alcantara	Denis Klok; Ilya Rudiukov	6–3, 6–3
Win	4–7	May 2022	M15 Cairo, Egypt	World Tennis Tour	Clay	(Australia) Tristan Schoolkate	(Austria) David Pichler (Ukraine) Volodymyr Uzhylovskyi	6–1, 7–5
Win	5–7	Sep 2022	M25 Darwin, Australia	World Tennis Tour	Hard	(United States) Kyle Seelig	(Australia) Tai Sach (Australia) Zaharije-Zak Talic	6–4, 6–4
Win	6–7	Oct 2022	M25 Cairns, Australia	World Tennis Tour	Hard	(United States) Kyle Seelig	(Australia) James McCabe (Australia) Adam Walton	6–4, 6–2
Win	7–7	Jan 2023	Nouméa, New Caledonia	Challenger	Hard	(New Zealand) Rubin Statham	(Japan) Toshihide Matsui (Japan) Kaito Uesugi	6–4, 6–3
Win	9–7	Mar 2023	M25 Canberra, Australia	World Tennis Tour	Clay	(Australia) Zaharije-Zak Talic	(Australia) Blake Bayldon (Australia) Jordan Smith	7–5, 6–3
Win	9–7	Apr 2023	San Luis Potosí, Mexico	Challenger	Clay	(Australia) Adam Walton	(Zimbabwe) Benjamin Lock (New Zealand) Rubin Statham	5–7, 6–3, [10–5]
Win	10–7	Jan 2024	Nouméa (2)	Challenger	Hard	(New Zealand) Rubin Statham	(Japan) Toshihide Matsui (Australia) Calum Puttergill	7–5, 6–2
Win	11–7	Nov 2024	M25 Brisbane, Australia	World Tennis Tour	Hard	(Australia) Brandon Walkin	(Australia) Joshua Charlton (United Kingdom) Emile Hudd	7–6^{(7–3)}, 6–3
Win	12–7	Jan 2025	Nouméa (3)	Challenger	Hard	(Australia) Blake Bayldon	(Japan) Ryuki Matsuda (Japan) Ryotaro Taguchi	6–3, 7–5
