= Gleb Sakharov =

French tennis player

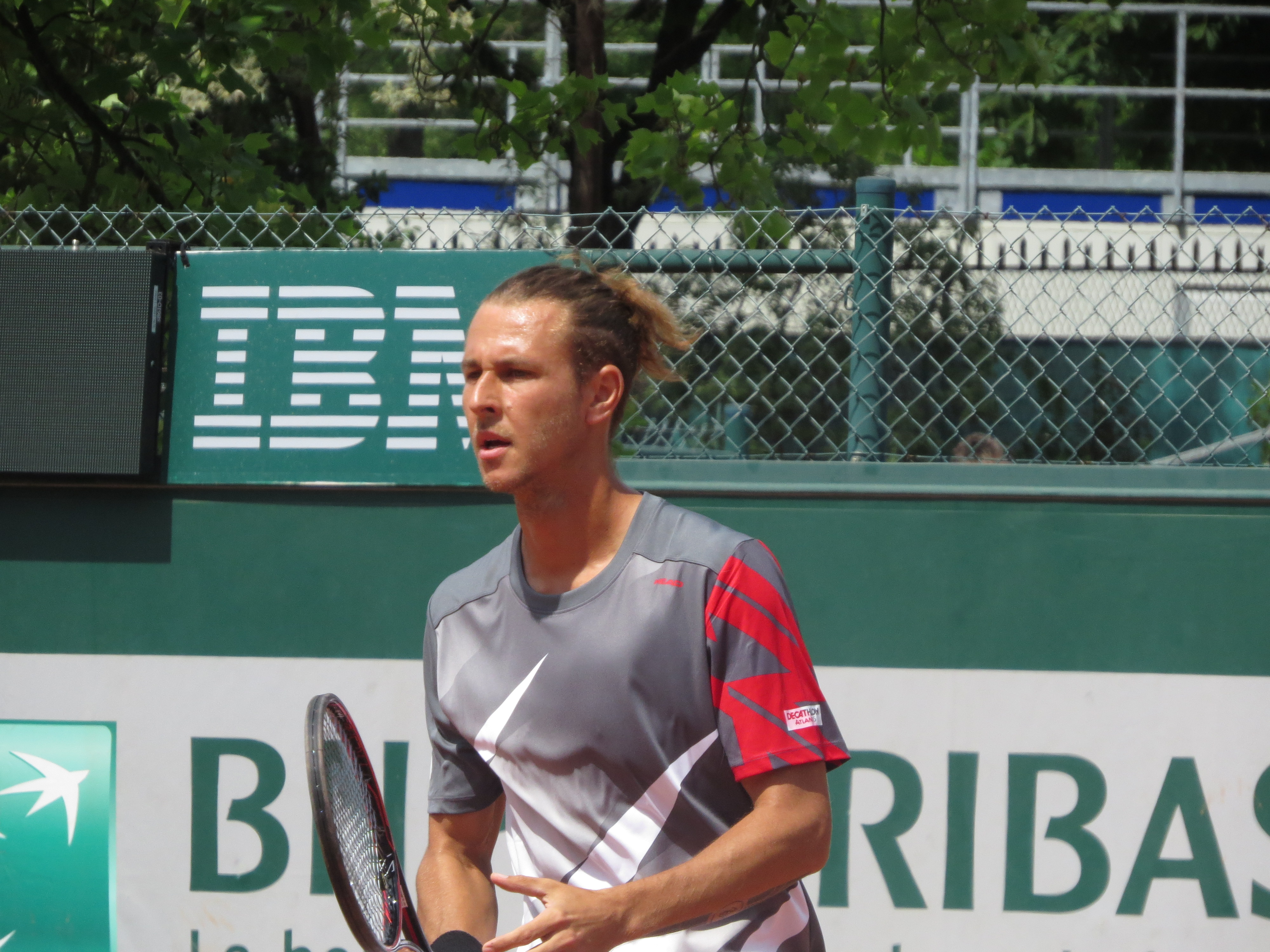
- Portrait of Gleb Sakharov
- Country (sports): France (2009–current); Uzbekistan (2005–2009)
- Residence: Nantes, France
- Born: June 10, 1988 (age 37) Tashkent, Uzbek SSR
- Height: 6 ft 1 in (1.85 m)
- Plays: Right-handed (two-handed backhand)
- Coach: Stéphane Plot, Julien Deville
- Prize money: $353,673

Singles
- Career record: 1–3
- Career titles: 0
- Highest ranking: No. 153 (8 January 2018)

Grand Slam singles results
- Australian Open: 1R (2019)
- French Open: Q2 (2017)
- Wimbledon: Q1 (2017, 2018)
- US Open: Q2 (2017)

Doubles
- Career record: 0–0
- Career titles: 0
- Highest ranking: No. 313 (10 June 2019)

Gleb Sakharov (born 10 June 1988) is a Soviet-born French tennis player.

Sakharov has a career-high ATP singles ranking of world No. 153 achieved on 8 January 2018 and a career-high doubles ranking of world No. 385 achieved on 11 June 2012. Sakharov has won 11 ITF Futures singles titles and 9 ITF Futures doubles titles.

Sakharov made his ATP main draw debut at the 2017 Swiss Open Gstaad, where he qualified for the main draw and won his first-round match against Swiss Antoine Bellier.

Sakharov's sole appearance at a Grand Slam came at the 2019 Australian Open, where he battled past Quentin Halys, Calvin Hemery and Tim Smyczek in qualifying, before losing to Maximilian Marterer in the 1st round.

== Challenger and Futures finals ==
=== Singles: 31 (11–20) ===
Legend (singles) ATP Challenger Tour (0–1) ITF Futures Tour (11–19)	Titles by surface Hard (7–9) Clay (3–10) Grass (0–0) Carpet (1–1)

Result	W–L	Date	Tournament	Tier	Surface	Opponent	Score
Loss	0–1	Jul 2010	Romania F7, Iași	Futures	Clay	(France) Maxime Teixeira	2–6, 3–6
Loss	0–2	Jul 2011	Serbia F4, Kikinda	Futures	Clay	(Montenegro) Goran Tošić	3–6, 1–6
Win	1–2	Sep 2011	Serbia F11, Niš	Futures	Clay	(Croatia) Kristijan Mesaroš	7–6^{(7–4)}, 6–1
Loss	1–3	Sep 2011	Serbia F12, Sokobanja	Futures	Clay	(Spain) Jordi Samper-Montaña	6–7^{(4–7)}, 4–6
Win	2–3	Oct 2011	Turkey F29, Antalya	Futures	Hard	(Germany) Michel Dornbusch	5–7, 6–2, 7–5
Loss	2–4	Jan 2012	Israel F1, Eilat	Futures	Hard	(Italy) Claudio Grassi	6–7^{(5–7)}, 3–6
Win	3–4	Mar 2012	Switzerland F2, Vaduz	Futures	Carpet	(Germany) Moritz Baumann	7–6^{(7–1)}, 6–3
Loss	3–5	May 2012	Great Britain F7, Edinburgh	Futures	Clay	(France) Jérôme Inzerillo	7–6^{(7–4)}, 4–6, 2–6
Loss	3–6	Jul 2013	Bulgaria F7, Plovdiv	Futures	Clay	(Greece) Theodoros Angelinos	4–6, 6–4, 4–6
Loss	3–7	Apr 2014	Egypt F13, Sharm El Sheikh	Futures	Clay	(Sweden) Elias Ymer	5–7, 4–6
Loss	3–8	Apr 2014	Egypt F14, Sharm El Sheikh	Futures	Clay	(Belgium) Germain Gigounon	6–4, 1–6, 2–6
Loss	3–9	Jun 2014	Italy F19, Siena	Futures	Clay	(Argentina) Pedro Cachin	6–7^{(2–7)}, 5–7
Loss	3–10	Aug 2014	Serbia F10, Novi Sad	Futures	Clay	(Serbia) Ivan Bjelica	2–6, 1–6
Loss	3–11	Jan 2015	France F1, Bagnoles-de-l'Orne	Futures	Clay	(France) Yannick Thivant	1–6, 0–6
Win	4–11	Jul 2015	France F12, Montauban	Futures	Clay	(France) Maxime Teixeira	6–4, 6–4
Loss	4–12	Oct 2015	Egypt F33, Sharm El Sheikh	Futures	Hard	(Czech Republic) Jaroslav Pospíšil	6–3, 1–6, 0–6
Win	5–12	Oct 2015	Egypt F34, Sharm El Sheikh	Futures	Hard	(Czech Republic) Jaroslav Pospíšil	6–2 ret.
Win	6–12	Oct 2015	Egypt F35, Sharm El Sheikh	Futures	Hard	(United Kingdom) Jamie Whiteford	7–6^{(8–6)}, 6–2
Win	7–12	Feb 2016	Egypt F5, Sharm El Sheikh	Futures	Hard	(Italy) Antonio Massara	6–0, 4–6, 7–6^{(7–4)}
Loss	7–13	Mar 2016	Egypt F10, Sharm El Sheikh	Futures	Hard	(Egypt) Karim-Mohamed Maamoun	4–6, 6–4, 5–7
Loss	7–14	Dec 2016	Turkey F50, Antalya	Futures	Hard	(Zimbabwe) Takanyi Garanganga	4–6, 4–6
Win	8–14	Dec 2016	Turkey F51, Antalya	Futures	Hard	(Zimbabwe) Takanyi Garanganga	6–3, 7–6^{(7–4)}
Win	9–14	Jan 2017	France F2, Bressuire	Futures	Hard	(France) Grégoire Jacq	6–3, 6–3
Loss	9–15	Feb 2017	Egypt F4, Sharm El Sheikh	Futures	Hard	(Germany) Jonas Lütjen	6–7^{(3–7)}, 5–7
Loss	9–16	Mar 2017	Canada F1, Gatineau	Futures	Hard	(Canada) Denis Shapovalov	2–6, 4–6
Loss	9–17	Mar 2017	Canada F2, Sherbrooke	Futures	Hard	(Canada) Félix Auger-Aliassime	6–3, 3–6, 4–6
Loss	9–18	Apr 2017	Egypt F13, Sharm El Sheikh	Futures	Hard	(Bosnia and Herzegovina) Aldin Šetkić	6–3, 2–6, 0–6
Win	10–18	Apr 2017	France F9, Angers	Futures	Clay	(France) Geoffrey Blancaneaux	6–4, 6–4
Win	11–18	Sep 2018	Portugal F18, Oliveira de Azeméis	Futures	Hard	(Belgium) Yannick Mertens	7–6^{(9–7)}, 6–4
Loss	11–19	Oct 2018	France F20, Nevers	Futures	Hard	(France) Grégoire Jacq	3–6, 2–6
Loss	0–1	Oct 2018	Ismaning, Germany	Challenger	Carpet	(Italy) Filippo Baldi	4–6, 4–6

=== Doubles: 18 (9–9) ===
Legend (doubles) ATP Challenger Tour (0–0) ITF Futures Tour (9–9)	Titles by surface Hard (4–5) Clay (5–4) Grass (0–0)

Result	W–L	Date	Tournament	Tier	Surface	Partner	Opponents	Score
Win	1–0	Jun 2010	Morocco F3, Rabat	Futures	Clay	(France) Marc Auradou	(United States) Blake Strode (United States) Christian Welte	7–6^{(7–3)}, 7–5
Loss	1–1	Feb 2011	France F2, Feucherolles	Futures	Hard	(France) Vincent Stouff	(Italy) Riccardo Ghedin (France) Fabrice Martin	3–6, 2–6
Loss	1–2	Jul 2011	Belgium F4, Middelkerke	Futures	Hard	(Romania) Andrei Dăescu	(Netherlands) Miliaan Niesten (Netherlands) Xander Spong	6–1, 0–6, [4–10]
Win	2–2	Sep 2011	Serbia F11, Niš	Futures	Clay	(Russia) Mikhail Vasiliev	(Russia) Stepan Khotulev (Japan) Takuto Niki	6–2, 2–6, [10–7]
Win	3–2	Feb 2011	France F19, La Roche-sur-Yon	Futures	Hard	(France) Jeremy Blandin	(South Africa) Jean Andersen (Republic of Ireland) James Cluskey	7–6^{(7–2)}, 3–6, [10–7]
Win	4–2	Nov 2011	Turkey F30, Antalya	Futures	Hard	(Luxembourg) Mike Vermeer	(Germany) Michel Dornbusch (Germany) George von Massow	7–5, 6–3
Win	5–2	Dec 2011	Turkey F35, Antalya	Futures	Hard	(United Kingdom) Oliver Golding	(Italy) Antonio Comporto (Italy) Thomas Fabbiano	6–2, 6–1
Loss	5–3	Mar 2012	France F5, Poitiers	Futures	Hard	(South Africa) Ruan Roelofse	(France) Olivier Patience (France) Nicolas Renavand	2–6, 3–6
Loss	5–4	May 2012	Great Britain F7, Edinburgh	Futures	Clay	(France) Alexandre Sidorenko	(Belgium) Arthur de Greef (France) Jérôme Inzerillo	6–7^{(5–7)}, 6–3, [8–10]
Win	6–4	Jul 2013	Bulgaria F6, Haskovo	Futures	Clay	(France) Julien Demois	(Bulgaria) Dinko Halachev (Bulgaria) Petar Trendafilov	3–6, 6–3, [10–5]
Win	7–4	Jul 2013	Serbia F6, Kikinda	Futures	Clay	(Bulgaria) Dinko Halachev	(Romania) Alexandru-Daniel Carpen (Romania) Tudor Șulea	6–2, 3–6, [12–10]
Loss	7–5	Aug 2013	Serbia F7, Sombor	Futures	Clay	(Bulgaria) Dinko Halachev	(Croatia) Ivan Sabanov (Croatia) Matej Sabanov	6–4, 5–7, [5–10]
Loss	7–6	Oct 2013	France F18, Nevers	Futures	Hard	(France) Mathieu Rodrigues	(United Kingdom) David Rice (United Kingdom) Sean Thornley	3–6, 4–6
Loss	7–7	Jan 2014	France F1, Bagnoles-de-l'Orne	Futures	Clay	(France) Dorian Descloix	(Poland) Blazej Koniusz (Poland) Mateusz Kowalczyk	2–6, 3–6
Loss	7–8	Jun 2014	Italy F19, Siena	Futures	Clay	(France) Alexandre Massa	(Argentina) Pedro Cachin (Argentina) Pablo Galdón	3–6, 6–7^{(4–7)}
Win	8–8	Jan 2015	France F1, Bagnoles-de-l'Orne	Futures	Clay	(France) Dorian Descloix	(France) Quentin Halys (France) Alexandre Sidorenko	6–4, 6–2
Loss	8–9	Feb 2015	Turkey F6, Antalya	Futures	Hard	(Austria) Tristan-Samuel Weissborn	(South Africa) Ruan Roelofse (South Africa) Tucker Vorster	3–6, 6–2, [7–10]
Win	9–9	Feb 2016	Egypt F5, Sharm El Sheikh	Futures	Hard	(Czech Republic) Michal Schmid	(Egypt) Karim-Mohamed Maamoun (Czech Republic) Libor Salaba	6–3, 6–3
