= 2015 BNP Paribas de Nouvelle-Calédonie – Singles =

Singles
- 2015 BNP Paribas de Nouvelle-Calédonie

Final
- Champion: (Belgium) Steve Darcis
- Runner-up: (Spain) Adrián Menéndez-Maceiras
- Score: 6–3, 6–2

Events
Singles	Doubles
← 2014 ·	BNP Paribas de Nouvelle-Calédonie	· 2016 →

Alejandro Falla was the defending champion, but decided to compete in the 2015 Aircel Chennai Open instead.

Steve Darcis won the title, defeating Adrián Menéndez-Maceiras 6–3, 6–2 in the final.

== Seeds ==
1. (France) Adrian Mannarino (semifinals)
2. (France) Kenny de Schepper (first round)
3. (Argentina) Horacio Zeballos (second round)
4. (Chinese Taipei) Jimmy Wang (semifinals)
5. (Japan) Yuichi Sugita (first round)
6. (France) Stéphane Robert (second round)
7. (Spain) Adrián Menéndez-Maceiras (final)
8. (United States) Bradley Klahn (quarterfinals)

== Draw ==
=== Key ===
- Q = Qualifier
- WC = Wild card
- LL = Lucky loser
- Alt = Alternate
- ITF = ITF entry
- PR = Protected ranking
- SR = Special ranking
- SE = Special exempt
- JE = Junior exempt
- JR = Junior Accelerator Programme entrant
- CO = College Accelerator Programme entrant
- NG = Next Gen Accelerator Program entrant
- w/o = Walkover
- r = Retired
- d = Defaulted

=== Finals ===
Semifinals
1/WC	(France) Adrian Mannarino	4	5
(Belgium) Steve Darcis	6	7
4	(Chinese Taipei) Jimmy Wang	7	4	6^{2}
7	(Spain) Adrián Menéndez-Maceiras	5	6	7^{7}

Final
(Belgium) Steve Darcis	6	6
7	(Spain) Adrián Menéndez-Maceiras	3	2

=== Top half ===
First round
1/WC	(France) A Mannarino	7	7
(France) E Couacaud	5	5
(France) J Eysseric	4	0
Q	(United States) B Fratangelo	6	6
(Republic of Ireland) J McGee	2	6	6
(United States) T Sandgren	6	0	1
(United States) A Krajicek	3	1^{r}
8	(United States) B Klahn	6	3
3	(Argentina) H Zeballos	6	6
(Chile) G Lama	1	4
(Belgium) S Darcis	6^{5}	6	6
(Brazil) F de Paula	7^{7}	0	3
(Netherlands) B Westerhof	2	7	1
(France) D Guez	6	5	6
(Chile) N Jarry	6^{1}	2
6	(France) S Robert	7^{7}	6

Second round
1/WC	(France) A Mannarino	6	6
Q	(United States) B Fratangelo	4	2
(Republic of Ireland) J McGee	4	2
8	(United States) B Klahn	6	6
3	(Argentina) H Zeballos	2	3
(Belgium) S Darcis	6	6
(France) D Guez	6	7^{8}
6	(France) S Robert	1	6^{6}

Quarterfinals
1/WC	(France) A Mannarino	4	7	6
8	(United States) B Klahn	6	5	1
(Belgium) S Darcis	6	3	6
(France) D Guez	4	6	2

Semifinals
1/WC	(France) A Mannarino	4	5
(Belgium) S Darcis	6	7

=== Bottom half ===
First round
5	(Japan) Y Sugita	4	2
Q	(Brazil) G Clezar	6	6
(France) V Millot	6	6
Q	(United States) J Donaldson	4	4
(France) G Mina	2	1
(Chinese Taipei) T Chen	6	6
Q	(Argentina) M Trungelliti	4	6	4
4	(Chinese Taipei) J Wang	6	0	6
7	(Spain) A Menéndez-Maceiras	3
(Belgium) A De Greef	1^{r}
WC	(France) J-S Tatlot	6	6
WC	(France) M Bourque	2	4
WC	(France) L Lokoli	3	2
(United States) C Buchanan	6	6
(United States) J Jenkins	6	6
2	(France) K de Schepper	4	4

Second round
Q	(Brazil) G Clezar	4	7^{7}	6
(France) V Millot	6	6^{5}	4
(Chinese Taipei) T Chen	1	3
4	(Chinese Taipei) J Wang	6	6
7	(Spain) A Menéndez-Maceiras	6	6
WC	(France) J-S Tatlot	0	4
(United States) C Buchanan	6	2	7^{7}
(United States) J Jenkins	1	6	6^{4}

Quarterfinals
Q	(Brazil) G Clezar	4	3
4	(Chinese Taipei) J Wang	6	6
7	(Spain) A Menéndez-Maceiras	6	6
(United States) C Buchanan	1	2

Semifinals
4	(Chinese Taipei) J Wang	7	4	6^{2}
7	(Spain) A Menéndez-Maceiras	5	6	7^{7}
