= 2014 BNP Paribas de Nouvelle-Calédonie – Doubles =

Doubles
- 2014 BNP Paribas de Nouvelle-Calédonie

Final
- Champions: (United States) Austin Krajicek (United States) Tennys Sandgren
- Runners-up: (Croatia) Ante Pavić (Slovenia) Blaž Rola
- Score: 7–6^{(7–4)}, 6–3

Events
Singles	Doubles
← 2013 ·	BNP Paribas de Nouvelle-Calédonie	· 2015 →

Samuel Groth and Toshihide Matsui were the defending champions but decided not to participate.

Krajicek and Sandgren won the title, defeating Ante Pavić and Blaž Rola in the final, 7–6^{(7–4)}, 6–3.

== Seeds ==
1. (United States) Austin Krajicek / (United States) Tennys Sandgren (champions)
2. (United Kingdom) Brydan Klein / (New Zealand) Jose Statham (quarterfinals)
3. (Spain) Adrián Menéndez-Maceiras / (New Zealand) Artem Sitak (first round)
4. (United States) Denis Kudla / (Canada) Peter Polansky (quarterfinals)

== Draw ==
=== Key ===
- Q = Qualifier
- WC = Wild card
- LL = Lucky loser
- Alt = Alternate
- SE = Special exempt
- PR = Protected ranking
- ITF = ITF entry
- JE = Junior exempt
- w/o = Walkover
- r = Retired
- d = Defaulted
- SR = Special ranking

=== Draw ===
First round
1	(United States) A Krajicek (United States) T Sandgren	7^{7}	7
(France) G Burquier (France) D Guez	6^{4}	5
WC	(Canada) S Diez (Republic of Ireland) J McGee	2	6	[10]
(Belgium) G Gigounon (Belgium) D Goffin	6	0	[4]
4	(United States) D Kudla (Canada) P Polansky	6	7^{7}
WC	(France) M Chazal (France) N N'Godrela	1	6^{4}
(Spain) G Granollers (Spain) P Riba	7	1	[10]
(Italy) A Arnaboldi (Israel) A Weintraub	5	6	[3]
(France) A Olivetti (France) M Teixeira	5	6	[10]
(Belgium) K Coppejans (Netherlands) J Huta Galung	7	3	[8]
(Belgium) R Bemelmans (Ukraine) D Molchanov	7^{8}	6
3	(Spain) A Menéndez-Maceiras (New Zealand) A Sitak	6^{6}	4
(Croatia) A Pavić (Slovenia) B Rola	4	6	[16]
Alt	(Chinese Taipei) L-C Huang (Spain) J Samper-Montaña	6	4	[14]
(Colombia) A Falla (Czech Republic) J Mertl	5	2
2	(United Kingdom) B Klein (New Zealand) J Statham	7	6

Quarterfinals
1	(United States) A Krajicek (United States) T Sandgren	6	6
WC	(Canada) S Diez (Republic of Ireland) J McGee	4	4
4	(United States) D Kudla (Canada) P Polansky	4	2
(Spain) G Granollers (Spain) P Riba	6	6
(France) A Olivetti (France) M Teixeira	4	6	[7]
(Belgium) R Bemelmans (Ukraine) D Molchanov	6	3	[10]
(Croatia) A Pavić (Slovenia) B Rola	6	6
2	(United Kingdom) B Klein (New Zealand) J Statham	4	4

Semifinals
1	(United States) A Krajicek (United States) T Sandgren	6	7
(Spain) G Granollers (Spain) P Riba	4	5
(Belgium) R Bemelmans (Ukraine) D Molchanov	3	6^{6}
(Croatia) A Pavić (Slovenia) B Rola	6	7^{8}

Final
1	(United States) A Krajicek (United States) T Sandgren	7^{7}	6
(Croatia) A Pavić (Slovenia) B Rola	6^{4}	3
