= 2015 Cary Challenger – Doubles =

Doubles
- 2015 Cary Challenger

Final
- Champions: (United States) Chase Buchanan (Slovenia) Blaž Rola
- Runners-up: (United States) Austin Krajicek (United States) Nicholas Monroe
- Score: 6–4, 6–7^{{5–7}}, [10–4]

Events
Singles	Doubles
Cary Challenger	· 2016 →

Chase Buchanan and Blaž Rola won the title, beating Austin Krajicek and Nicholas Monroe 6–4, 6–7^{{5–7}}, [10–4]

== Seeds ==
1. (United States) Austin Krajicek / (United States) Nicholas Monroe (final)
2. (South Africa) Dean O'Brien / (South Africa) Ruan Roelofse (first round)
3. (United States) Dennis Novikov / (Chile) Julio Peralta (quarterfinals)
4. (United States) Ryan Harrison / (United Kingdom) Brydan Klein (first round)

== Draw ==
=== Key ===
- Q = Qualifier
- WC = Wild card
- LL = Lucky loser
- Alt = Alternate
- ITF = ITF entry
- PR = Protected ranking
- SR = Special ranking
- SE = Special exempt
- JE = Junior exempt
- JR = Junior Accelerator Programme entrant
- CO = College Accelerator Programme entrant
- NG = Next Gen Accelerator Program entrant
- w/o = Walkover
- r = Retired
- d = Defaulted

First round
1	(United States) A Krajicek (United States) N Monroe	6	5	[10]
(United States) M Krueger (United States) E Quigley	2	7	[5]
(South Africa) Damon Gooch (United States) Cameron Silverman	6	6
(Zimbabwe) T Garanganga (Argentina) F Mena	3	2
4	(United States) R Harrison (United Kingdom) B Klein	6	4	[7]
(United States) K King (United States) Connor Smith	4	6	[10]
(Italy) A Bega (United States) T Sandgren
WC	(Australia) Nicholas Horton (Sweden) Simon Norenius	w/o
(United States) Andrew Carter (United States) Wil Spencer	0	3
(Canada) P Bester (Canada) P Polansky	6	6
WC	(United States) Brett D. Clark (Canada) B Schnur	4	4
3	(United States) D Novikov (Chile) J Peralta	6	6
WC	(United States) Adrian Chamdani (United States) Vincent Lin	4	4
(Australia) C Ball (Australia) M Reid	6	6
(United States) C Buchanan (Slovenia) B Rola	4	6	[10]
2	(South Africa) D O'Brien (South Africa) R Roelofse	6	3	[6]

Quarterfinals
1	(United States) A Krajicek (United States) N Monroe	6	6
(South Africa) D Gooch (United States) C Silverman	1	1
(United States) K King (United States) C Smith	6	7
WC	(Australia) N Horton (Sweden) S Norenius	4	5
(Canada) P Bester (Canada) P Polansky	7	6
3	(United States) D Novikov (Chile) J Peralta	5	4
(Australia) C Ball (Australia) M Reid	6^{2}	3
(United States) C Buchanan (Slovenia) B Rola	7^{7}	6

Semifinals
1	(United States) A Krajicek (United States) N Monroe	6	3	[10]
(United States) K King (United States) C Smith	4	6	[5]
(Canada) P Bester (Canada) P Polansky	3	5
(United States) C Buchanan (Slovenia) B Rola	6	7

Final
1	(United States) A Krajicek (United States) N Monroe	4	7^{7}	[4]
(United States) C Buchanan (Slovenia) B Rola	6	6^{5}	[10]
