= 2015 Savannah Challenger =

- Date: 20 – 26 April
- Edition: 7th
- Draw: 32S / 16D
- Prize money: $50,000
- Surface: Green clay
- Location: Savannah, United States

Champions

Singles
- (South Korea) Chung Hyeon

Doubles
- (Argentina) Guillermo Durán / (Argentina) Horacio Zeballos
- Savannah Challenger

The 2015 Savannah Challenger was a professional tennis tournament played on clay courts. It was the sixth edition of the tournament which was part of the 2015 ATP Challenger Tour. It took place in Savannah, United States between April 20 and April 26, 2015.

== Singles main-draw entrants ==
=== Seeds ===
Country	Player	Rank	Seed
USA	Tim Smyczek	69	1
BEL	Ruben Bemelmans	99	2
ARG	Facundo Bagnis	102	3
KOR	Hyeon Chung	112	4
POR	Gastão Elias	125	5
CAN	Frank Dancevic	129	6
ARG	Horacio Zeballos	141	7
JPN	Yoshihito Nishioka	154	8

=== Other entrants ===
The following players received wildcards into the singles main draw:

- (United States) Frances Tiafoe
- (United States) Rhyne Williams
- (United States) Ernesto Escobedo
- (United States) Stefan Kozlov

The following player received entry with a protected ranking:

- (United States) Tennys Sandgren

The following player received entry as alternate:

- (United States) Mitchell Krueger

The following players received entry from the qualifying draw:

- (Argentina) Guillermo Durán
- (United States) Tommy Paul
- (Chile) Julio Peralta
- (India) Sanam Singh

The following players received entry as a lucky loser:

- (Zimbabwe) Takanyi Garanganga

== Doubles main-draw entrants ==
=== Seeds ===
Country	Player	Country	Player	Rank	Seed
ARG	Guillermo Durán	ARG	Horacio Zeballos	170	1
FRA	Fabrice Martin	IND	Purav Raja	220	2
GBR	Ken Skupski	GBR	Neal Skupski	235	3
ARG	Facundo Argüello	ARG	Facundo Bagnis	342	4

== Champions ==
=== Singles ===
- (South Korea) Chung Hyeon def. (Republic of Ireland) James McGee, 6–3, 6–2

=== Doubles ===
- (Argentina) Guillermo Durán / (Argentina) Horacio Zeballos def. (United States) Dennis Novikov / (Chile) Julio Peralta, 6–4, 6–3
