= 2016 BNP Paribas de Nouvelle-Calédonie – Doubles =

Doubles
- 2016 BNP Paribas de Nouvelle-Calédonie

Final
- Champion: (France) Julien Benneteau (France) Édouard Roger-Vasselin
- Runner-up: (France) Grégoire Barrère (France) Tristan Lamasine
- Score: 7–6^{(7–4)}, 3–6, [10–5]

Events
| Singles | Doubles |
| ← 2015 · | BNP Paribas de Nouvelle-Calédonie | · 2017 → |

Austin Krajicek and Tennys Sandgren were the defending champions, but chose not to defend their title.
Julien Benneteau and Édouard Roger-Vasselin won an all French final, beating Grégoire Barrère and Tristan Lamasine 7–6^{(7–4)}, 3–6, [10–5]

== Seeds ==
1. (France) Julien Benneteau / (France) Édouard Roger-Vasselin (champions)
2. (Italy) Federico Gaio / (Italy) Alessandro Giannessi (first round)
3. (United States) James Cerretani / (United States) Max Schnur (first round)
4. (Barbados) Darian King / (United States) Mitchell Krueger (quarterfinals)

== Draw ==
=== Key ===
- Q = Qualifier
- WC = Wild card
- LL = Lucky loser
- Alt = Alternate
- SE = Special exempt
- PR = Protected ranking
- ITF = ITF entry
- JE = Junior exempt
- w/o = Walkover
- r = Retired
- d = Defaulted
- SR = Special ranking

=== Draw ===
First round
1 | (France) J Benneteau (France) É Roger-Vasselin | 6 | 6
(Czech Republic) J Mertl (Austria) B Trinker | 4 | 2
WC | (France) M Chazal (France) Florian Reynet | 6^{9} | 2
(France) M Janvier (Germany) M Marterer | 7^{11} | 6
3 | (United States) J Cerretani (United States) M Schnur | 4 | 4
WC | (Switzerland) H Laaksonen (Switzerland) Loïc Perret | 6 | 6
(Australia) L Saville (Australia) J Thompson | 6 | 7
(France) M Bourgue (Italy) S Napolitano | 1 | 5
(France) G Barrère (France) T Lamasine | 6 | 6
WC | (Australia) Isaac Frost (Australia) Leon Frost | 3 | 2
(France) Q Halys (France) C Hemery | 7 | 2 | [8]
4 | (Barbados) D King (United States) M Krueger | 5 | 6 | [10]
(Spain) J Samper-Montaña (Argentina) M Trungelliti | 6 | 6
(Italy) Enrico Becuzzi (Spain) A Menéndez-Maceiras | 1 | 2
(Republic of Ireland) J McGee (Slovenia) B Rola | 6 | 7
2 | (Italy) F Gaio (Italy) A Giannessi | 4 | 5

Quarterfinals
1 | (France) J Benneteau (France) É Roger-Vasselin | 6 | 6
(France) M Janvier (Germany) M Marterer | 4 | 2
WC | (Switzerland) H Laaksonen (Switzerland) L Perret | 2 | 6^{5}
(Australia) L Saville (Australia) J Thompson | 6 | 7^{7}
(France) G Barrère (France) T Lamasine | 7 | 6
4 | (Barbados) D King (United States) M Krueger | 5 | 3
(Spain) J Samper-Montaña (Argentina) M Trungelliti | 6^{5} | 5
(Republic of Ireland) J McGee (Slovenia) B Rola | 7^{7} | 7

Semifinals
1 | (France) J Benneteau (France) É Roger-Vasselin | 1 | 6 | [10]
(Australia) L Saville (Australia) J Thompson | 6 | 3 | [8]
(France) G Barrère (France) T Lamasine | 3 | 6 | [10]
(Republic of Ireland) J McGee (Slovenia) B Rola | 6 | 4 | [7]

Final
1 | (France) J Benneteau (France) É Roger-Vasselin | 7^{7} | 3 | [10]
(France) G Barrère (France) T Lamasine | 6^{4} | 6 | [5]
