= 2015 Cary Challenger – Singles =

Singles
- 2015 Cary Challenger

Final
- Champion: (United States) Dennis Novikov
- Runner-up: (United States) Ryan Harrison
- Score: 6–4, 7–5

Events
Singles	Doubles
Cary Challenger	· 2016 →

Dennis Novikov won the all American final, beating Ryan Harrison 6–4, 7–5

== Seeds ==
1. (United States) Bjorn Fratangelo (quarterfinals)
2. (United States) Austin Krajicek (quarterfinals)
3. (Australia) John-Patrick Smith (second round)
4. (Slovenia) Blaž Rola (semifinals)
5. (United States) Ryan Harrison (final)
6. (United Kingdom) Brydan Klein (semifinals)
7. (United States) Dennis Novikov (champion)
8. (United States) Connor Smith (second round)

== Draw ==
=== Key ===
- Q = Qualifier
- WC = Wild card
- LL = Lucky loser
- Alt = Alternate
- SE = Special exempt
- PR = Protected ranking
- ITF = ITF entry
- JE = Junior exempt
- w/o = Walkover
- r = Retired
- d = Defaulted
- SR = Special ranking

=== Finals ===
Semifinals
6	(United Kingdom) Brydan Klein	6	5	5
7	(United States) Dennis Novikov	1	7	7
4	(Slovenia) Blaž Rola	6	5	2
5/WC	(United States) Ryan Harrison	4	7	6

Final
7	(United States) Dennis Novikov	6	7
5/WC	(United States) Ryan Harrison	4	5

=== Top half ===
First round
1	(United States) B Fratangelo	6	6
Q	(United States) Wil Spencer	2	2
(United States) M Krueger	7	6
(United States) T Sandgren	5	1
WC	(United States) Robbie Mudge	4	1
(United States) C Buchanan	6	6
PR	(United States) Dennis Nevolo	2	6	3
6	(United Kingdom) B Klein	6	0	6
3	(Australia) J-P Smith	6	6
Q	(Australia) Nicholas Horton	2	3
PR	(Canada) P Polansky	7^{7}	6^{2}	6
(Italy) A Bega	6^{3}	7^{7}	3
Q	(South Africa) Damon Gooch	7	3	7
WC	(Peru) N Álvarez	5	6	5
LL	(Switzerland) Keivon Tabrizi	2	2
7	(United States) D Novikov	6	6

Second round
1	(United States) B Fratangelo	6	6
(United States) M Krueger	3	3
(United States) C Buchanan	6^{10}	4
6	(United Kingdom) B Klein	7^{12}	6
3	(Australia) J-P Smith	3	3
PR	(Canada) P Polansky	6	6
Q	(South Africa) D Gooch	2	4
7	(United States) D Novikov	6	6

Quarterfinals
1	(United States) B Fratangelo	1	6	3
6	(United Kingdom) B Klein	6	3	6
PR	(Canada) P Polansky	6^{4}	1
7	(United States) D Novikov	7^{7}	6

Semifinals
6	(United Kingdom) B Klein	6	5	5
7	(United States) D Novikov	1	7	7

=== Bottom half ===
First round
8	(United States) Connor Smith	6	1	6
(Canada) P Bester	2	6	3
(United States) K King	6^{3}	6	6
(Australia) M Reid	7^{7}	0	4
(United Kingdom) D Cox	6^{6}	3
WC	(Canada) B Schnur	7^{8}	6
(El Salvador) M Arévalo	4	4
4	(Slovenia) B Rola	6	6
5/WC	(United States) R Harrison	6	6
(Argentina) F Mena	1	1
(Zimbabwe) T Garanganga	6	6
Q	(United States) R Schneider	2	1
(United States) E Quigley	2	6
(United Kingdom) J Milton	6	7
(United States) S Kozlov	5	6	2
2	(United States) A Krajicek	7	2	6

Second round
8	(United States) C Smith	1	6	3
(United States) K King	6	3	6
WC	(Canada) B Schnur	2	5
4	(Slovenia) B Rola	6	7
5/WC	(United States) R Harrison	6	6
(Zimbabwe) T Garanganga	3	4
(United Kingdom) J Milton	6^{4}	2
2	(United States) A Krajicek	7^{7}	6

Quarterfinals
(United States) K King	7^{7}	3	6^{4}
4	(Slovenia) B Rola	6^{2}	6	7^{7}
5/WC	(United States) R Harrison	7	7^{7}
2	(United States) A Krajicek	5	6^{2}

Semifinals
4	(Slovenia) B Rola	6	5	2
5/WC	(United States) R Harrison	4	7	7
