= 2016 Cary Challenger =

- Date: 10–18 September
- Edition: 2nd
- Draw: 32S / 16D
- Prize money: $50,000
- Surface: Hard
- Location: Cary, United States

Champions

Singles
- (Republic of Ireland) James McGee

Doubles
- (Canada) Philip Bester / (Canada) Peter Polansky
← 2015 ·	Cary Challenger	· 2017 →

The 2016 Cary Challenger was a professional tennis tournament played on hard courts. It was the 2nd edition of the tournament which was part of the 2016 ATP Challenger Tour. It took place in Cary, North Carolina, United States between 10 and 18 September 2016.

== Singles main-draw entrants ==
=== Seeds ===
Country	Player	Rank^{1}	Seed
USA	Dennis Novikov	121	1
USA	Frances Tiafoe	125	2
USA	Austin Krajicek	137	3
USA	Stefan Kozlov	154	4
CAN	Peter Polansky	159	5
BAR	Darian King	166	6
ESA	Marcelo Arévalo	176	7
USA	Ernesto Escobedo	201	8

- ^{1} Rankings are as of August 29, 2016.

=== Other entrants ===
The following players received wildcards into the singles main draw:

- (United States) Nick Stachowiak
- (Canada) Brayden Schnur
- (Australia) Nicholas Horton
- (United States) Ryan Shane

The following players received entry from the qualifying draw:

- (Republic of Ireland) James McGee
- (United States) Mackenzie McDonald
- (United States) Ryan Haviland
- (Italy) Erik Crepaldi

== Champions ==
=== Singles ===
- (Republic of Ireland) James McGee def. (United States) Ernesto Escobedo, 1–6, 6–1, 6–4.

=== Doubles ===
- (Canada) Philip Bester / (Canada) Peter Polansky def. (United States) Austin Krajicek / (United States) Stefan Kozlov, 6–2, 6–2.
