= 2014 Kentucky Bank Tennis Championships =

- Date: July 21–27
- Edition: 19th (men) / 17th (women)
- Category: ATP Challenger Tour; ITF Women's Circuit
- Prize money: $50,000 (men) $50,000 (women)
- Surface: Hard
- Location: Lexington, Kentucky, United States

Champions

Men's singles
- (Australia) James Duckworth

Women's singles
- (United States) Madison Brengle

Men's doubles
- (Canada) Peter Polansky / (Canada) Adil Shamasdin

Women's doubles
- (United Kingdom) Jocelyn Rae / (United Kingdom) Anna Smith
- Kentucky Bank Tennis Championships

The 2014 Kentucky Bank Tennis Championships was a professional tennis tournament played on outdoor hard courts. It was the nineteenth edition for the men and the seventeenth edition for the women, and part of the 2014 ATP Challenger Tour and the 2014 ITF Women's Circuit respectively, each offering a total of $50,000 in prize money. The event took place in Lexington, Kentucky, United States, on July 21–27, 2014.

== Men's singles main draw entrants ==
=== Seeds ===
Country	Player	Rank^{1}	Seed
RUS	Evgeny Donskoy	111	1
CAN	Peter Polansky	130	2
JPN	Yuichi Sugita	142	3
GBR	Dan Evans	145	4
GBR	James Ward	152	5
AUS	James Duckworth	159	6
ROU	Marius Copil	160	7
JPN	Hiroki Moriya	164	8

- ^{1} Rankings as of July 14, 2014

=== Other entrants ===
The following players received wildcards into the singles main draw:

- (United States) Jesse Witten
- (United States) Jared Donaldson
- (Australia) Thanasi Kokkinakis
- (United States) Eric Quigley

The following players received entry from the qualifying draw:

- (Italy) Erik Crepaldi
- (United States) Marcos Giron
- (Japan) Yoshihito Nishioka
- (United States) Raymond Sarmiento

The following player received a special exemption into the singles main draw:

- (Australia) Benjamin Mitchell

The following player received entry by a lucky loser spot:

- (United States) Evan King
- (Australia) Jordan Thompson

== Women's singles main draw entrants ==
=== Seeds ===
Country	Player	Rank^{1}	Seed
AUS	Jarmila Gajdošová	149	1
USA	Madison Brengle	151	2
USA	Melanie Oudin	156	3
JPN	Eri Hozumi	159	4
USA	Irina Falconi	163	5
BEL	An-Sophie Mestach	164	6
USA	Nicole Gibbs	167	7
SUI	Romina Oprandi	176	8

- ^{1} Rankings as of July 14, 2014

=== Other entrants ===
The following players received wildcards into the singles main draw:

- (United States) Louisa Chirico
- (United States) Julie Ditty
- (United States) Julia Elbaba
- (United States) Jamie Loeb

The following players received entry from the qualifying draw:

- (United States) Kristie Ahn
- (United States) Jennifer Brady
- (United States) Alexandra Mueller
- (United States) Maria Sanchez

The following player received entry into the singles main draw as a lucky loser:

- (United Kingdom) Emily Webley-Smith

The following players entered using a protected ranking:

- (Russia) Daria Gavrilova

== Champions ==
=== Men's singles ===
- (Australia) James Duckworth def. (United Kingdom) James Ward 6–3, 6–4

=== Women's singles ===
- (United States) Madison Brengle def. (United States) Nicole Gibbs 6–3, 6–4

=== Men's doubles ===
- (Canada) Peter Polansky / (Canada) Adil Shamasdin vs. (Republic of Ireland) James McGee / (United States) Chase Buchanan 6–4, 6–2

=== Women's doubles ===
- (United Kingdom) Jocelyn Rae / (United Kingdom) Anna Smith def. (Japan) Shuko Aoyama / (United States) Keri Wong 6–4, 6–4
