= 2014 Kentucky Bank Tennis Championships – Men's singles =

Men's singles
- 2014 Kentucky Bank Tennis Championships

Final
- Champion: (Australia) James Duckworth
- Runner-up: (United Kingdom) James Ward
- Score: 6–3, 6–4

Events
Singles	men	women
Doubles	men	women
← 2013 ·	Kentucky Bank Tennis Championships	· 2015 →

James Ward was the defending champion, but lost the re-match of the 2013 final to James Duckworth with the Australian winning the title this year, 6–3, 6–4.

== Seeds ==
1. (Russia) Evgeny Donskoy (first round)
2. (Canada) Peter Polansky (first round)
3. (Japan) Yuichi Sugita (second round)
4. (United Kingdom) Dan Evans (first round)
5. (United Kingdom) James Ward (final)
6. (Australia) James Duckworth (champion)
7. (Romania) Marius Copil (second round)
8. (Japan) Hiroki Moriya (second round)

== Draw ==
=== Key ===
- Q = Qualifier
- WC = Wild card
- LL = Lucky loser
- Alt = Alternate
- SE = Special exempt
- PR = Protected ranking
- ITF = ITF entry
- JE = Junior exempt
- w/o = Walkover
- r = Retired
- d = Defaulted
- SR = Special ranking

=== Finals ===
Semifinals
(United States) Wayne Odesnik	3	3
5	(United Kingdom) James Ward	6	6
WC	(Australia) Thanasi Kokkinakis	6^{2}	3
6	(Australia) James Duckworth	7^{7}	6

Final
5	(United Kingdom) James Ward	3	4
6	(Australia) James Duckworth	6	6

=== Top half ===
First round
1	(Russia) E Donskoy	7	3	5
(Republic of Ireland) J McGee	6^{3}	6	7
Q	(United States) M Giron	4	2
(United States) A Krajicek	6	6
(United States) W Odesnik	6	6
Q	(Japan) Y Nishioka	1	4
Q	(United States) R Sarmiento	4	5
8	(Japan) H Moriya	6	7
4	(United Kingdom) D Evans	4	3
(France) V Millot	6	6
(Ecuador) E Gómez	4	6	6
SE	(Australia) B Mitchell	6	3	3
Q	(Italy) Erik Crepaldi	4	6	0
WC	(United States) J Witten	6	3	6
WC	(United States) J Donaldson	6^{4}	4
5	(United Kingdom) J Ward	7^{7}	6

Second round
(Republic of Ireland) J McGee	6	6
(United States) A Krajicek	0	1
(United States) W Odesnik	6	4	6
8	(Japan) H Moriya	2	6	4
(France) V Millot	6	6
(Ecuador) E Gómez	4	3
WC	(United States) J Witten	4	7^{7}	2
5	(United Kingdom) J Ward	6	6^{5}	6

Quarterfinals
(Republic of Ireland) J McGee	3	4
(United States) W Odesnik	6	6
(France) V Millot	6^{4}	2^{r}
5	(United Kingdom) J Ward	7^{7}	4

Semifinals
(United States) W Odesnik	3	3
5	(United Kingdom) J Ward	6	6

=== Bottom half ===
First round
7	(Romania) M Copil	7^{7}	6
(Argentina) A Collarini	6^{1}	3
WC	(Australia) T Kokkinakis	6	6
(United Kingdom) D Smethurst	2	1
(Belgium) R Bemelmans	6^{5}	6	7^{7}
(United States) J Jenkins	7^{7}	3	6^{1}
(United Kingdom) D Cox	3	2
3	(Japan) Y Sugita	6	6
6	(Australia) J Duckworth	7^{7}	3	7
WC	(United States) E Quigley	6^{5}	6	5
LL	(Australia) J Thompson	6	6
LL	(United States) E King	3	4
(United States) R Williams	3	6	1
(United States) C Buchanan	6	3	6
(Australia) M Reid	6	3	6
2	(Canada) P Polansky	4	6	3

Second round
7	(Romania) M Copil	4	6	3
WC	(Australia) T Kokkinakis	6	4	6
(Belgium) R Bemelmans	7^{7}	4	6
3	(Japan) Y Sugita	6^{1}	6	4
6	(Australia) J Duckworth	6	6
LL	(Australia) J Thompson	4	4
(United States) C Buchanan	4	6	6
(Australia) M Reid	6	2	3

Quarterfinals
WC	(Australia) T Kokkinakis	7^{9}	7^{8}
(Belgium) R Bemelmans	6^{7}	6^{6}
6	(Australia) J Duckworth	6	6
(United States) C Buchanan	4	3

Semifinals
WC	(Australia) T Kokkinakis	6^{2}	3
6	(Australia) J Duckworth	7^{7}	6
