= 2014 Kentucky Bank Tennis Championships – Men's doubles =

Men's doubles
- 2014 Kentucky Bank Tennis Championships

Final
- Champions: (Canada) Peter Polansky (Canada) Adil Shamasdin
- Runners-up: (United States) Chase Buchanan (Republic of Ireland) James McGee
- Score: 6–4, 6–2

Events
Singles	men	women
Doubles	men	women
- Kentucky Bank Tennis Championships

Frank Dancevic and Peter Polansky were the defending champions, but Dancevic chose not to compete.
Polansky paired with Adil Shamasdin and they won the title, defeating Chase Buchanan and James McGee in the final 6–4, 6–2.

== Seeds ==
1. (Brazil) Marcelo Demoliner / (India) Purav Raja (first round)
2. (Canada) Peter Polansky / (Canada) Adil Shamasdin (champions)
3. (New Zealand) Marcus Daniell / (New Zealand) Artem Sitak (quarterfinals)
4. (Australia) Jordan Kerr / (France) Fabrice Martin (first round)

== Draw ==
Key

- Q = Qualifier
- WC = Wild card
- LL = Lucky loser
- Alt = Alternate
- ITF = ITF entry
- PR = Protected ranking
- SR = Special ranking
- SE = Special exempt
- JE = Junior exempt
- JR = Junior Accelerator Programme entrant
- CO = College Accelerator Programme entrant
- NG = Next Gen Accelerator Program entrant
- w/o = Walkover
- r = Retired
- d = Defaulted

First round
1	(Brazil) M Demoliner (India) P Raja	1	6	[9]
(United States) A Krajicek (United States) R Williams	6	3	[11]
(Argentina) A Collarini (Ecuador) E Gómez	4	3
(United States) J Jenkins (India) S Singh	6	6
4	(Australia) J Kerr (France) F Martin	6^{11}	6	[7]
WC	(United States) M Giron (United States) D Novikov	7^{13}	2	[10]
(Australia) B Mitchell (Australia) J Thompson
(United States) C Buchanan (Republic of Ireland) J McGee	w/o
(United States) S Bangoura (United States) E King	3	5
WC	(United States) Kevin Metka (United States) E Quigley	6	7
(Belgium) R Bemelmans (Russia) E Donskoy	6^{7}	4
3	(New Zealand) M Daniell (New Zealand) A Sitak	7^{9}	6
WC	(United States) Mark Ein (United States) J Witten	2	3
(United Kingdom) D Evans (United Kingdom) D Smethurst	6	6
(Australia) J Duckworth (Australia) M Reid	0	3
2	(Canada) P Polansky (Canada) A Shamsdin	6	6

Quarterfinals
(United States) A Krajicek (United States) R Williams	4	3
(United States) J Jenkins (India) S Singh	6	6
WC	(United States) M Giron (United States) D Novikov	2	3
(United States) C Buchanan (Republic of Ireland) J McGee	6	6
WC	(United States) K Metka (United States) E Quigley	6	6
3	(New Zealand) M Daniell (New Zealand) A Sitak	4	4
(United Kingdom) D Evans (United Kingdom) D Smethurst	7	4	[5]
2	(Canada) P Polansky (Canada) A Shamsdin	5	6	[10]

Semifinals
(United States) J Jenkins (India) S Singh	1	4
(United States) C Buchanan (Republic of Ireland) J McGee	6	6
WC	(United States) K Metka (United States) E Quigley	4	4
2	(Canada) P Polansky (Canada) A Shamsdin	6	6

Final
(United States) C Buchanan (Republic of Ireland) J McGee	4	2
2	(Canada) P Polansky (Canada) A Shamsdin	6	6
