= 2016 BNP Paribas de Nouvelle-Calédonie =

- Date: 4–9 January
- Edition: 13th
- Draw: 32S / 8Q / 16D
- Prize money: $75,000+H
- Surface: Hard
- Location: Nouméa, New Caledonia

Champions

Singles
- (France) Adrian Mannarino

Doubles
- (France) Julien Benneteau / (France) Édouard Roger-Vasselin
← 2015 ·	BNP Paribas de Nouvelle-Calédonie	· 2017 →

The 2016 BNP Paribas de Nouvelle-Calédonie was a professional tennis tournament played on hard courts. It was the thirteenth edition of the tournament which was part of the 2016 ATP Challenger Tour. It took place in Nouméa, New Caledonia on 4–9 January 2016.

== Singles main-draw entrants ==
=== Seeds ===
Country	Player	Rank	Seed
FRA	Adrian Mannarino	47	1
COL	Alejandro Falla	122	2
FRA	Édouard Roger-Vasselin	123	3
ESP	Adrián Menéndez Maceiras	143	4
SVN	Blaž Rola	144	5
AUS	Jordan Thompson	154	6
GER	Daniel Brands	159	7
SWI	Henri Laaksonen	191	8

- ^{1} Rankings are as of December 28, 2015.

=== Other entrants ===
The following players received wildcards into the singles main draw:

- (France) Adrian Mannarino
- (France) Maxime Janvier
- (France) Nicolas N'Godrela
- (France) Julien Benneteau

The following players received entry from the qualifying draw:

- (Australia) Isaac Frost
- (Germany) Maximilian Marterer
- (Italy) Stefano Napolitano
- (France) Florian Reynet

== Champions ==
=== Singles ===
- (France) Adrian Mannarino def. (Colombia) Alejandro Falla 5–7, 6–2, 6–2

=== Doubles ===
- (France) Julien Benneteau / (France) Édouard Roger-Vasselin def. (France) Grégoire Barrère / (France) Tristan Lamasine 7–6^{(7–4)}, 3–6, [10–5]
