= 2015 BNP Paribas de Nouvelle-Calédonie – Doubles =

Doubles
- 2015 BNP Paribas de Nouvelle-Calédonie

Final
- Champion: (United States) Austin Krajicek (United States) Tennys Sandgren
- Runner-up: (United States) Jarmere Jenkins (United States) Bradley Klahn
- Score: 7–6^{(7–2)}, 6–7^{(5–7)}, [10–5]

Events
Singles	Doubles
← 2014 ·	BNP Paribas de Nouvelle-Calédonie	· 2016 →

Austin Krajicek and Tennys Sandgren were the defending champions.

Krajicek and Sandgren defended their title, defeating Jarmere Jenkins and Bradley Klahn in the final, 7–6^{(7–2)}, 6–7^{(5–7)}, [10–5].

== Seeds ==
1. (Australia) Rameez Junaid / (Germany) Frank Moser (semifinals)
2. (Spain) Adrián Menéndez-Maceiras / (Netherlands) Boy Westerhof (quarterfinals)
3. (United States) Chase Buchanan / (Chinese Taipei) Chen Ti (quarterfinals)
4. (United States) Austin Krajicek / (United States) Tennys Sandgren (champions)

== Draw ==
=== Key ===
- Q = Qualifier
- WC = Wild card
- LL = Lucky loser
- Alt = Alternate
- ITF = ITF entry
- PR = Protected ranking
- SR = Special ranking
- SE = Special exempt
- JE = Junior exempt
- JR = Junior Accelerator Programme entrant
- CO = College Accelerator Programme entrant
- NG = Next Gen Accelerator Program entrant
- w/o = Walkover
- r = Retired
- d = Defaulted

First round
1	(Australia) R Junaid (Germany) F Moser	6	6
(France) E Couacaud (France) L Lokoli	3	3
WC	(France) Julien Delaplane (France) N N'Godrela	4	6	[10]
(Belgium) S Darcis (France) G Mina	6	4	[8]
4	(United States) A Krajicek (United States) T Sandgren	6	6
(France) J Eysseric (France) D Guez	2	3
(France) K de Schepper (France) V Millot	4	6	[11]
(Argentina) M Trungelliti (Argentina) H Zeballos	6	2	[9]
WC	(France) M Bourque (France) J-S Tatlot	0	4
WC	(United States) B Fratangelo (Australia) Gavin van Peperzeel	6	6
(Brazil) G Clezar (Brazil) F de Paula	6^{5}	6	[8]
3	(United States) C Buchanan (Chinese Taipei) T Chen	7^{7}	3	[10]
(United States) J Jenkins (United States) B Klahn	6^{6}	6	[15]
(Chile) N Jarry (Chile) G Lama	7^{8}	3	[13]
(Chinese Taipei) L-c Huang (Japan) T Matsui	6^{3}	1
2	(Spain) A Menéndez-Maceiras (Netherlands) B Westerhof	7^{7}	6

Quarterfinals
1	(Australia) R Junaid (Germany) F Moser	6	6
WC	(France) J Delaplane (France) N N'Godrela	2	4
4	(United States) A Krajicek (United States) T Sandgren	6	6
(France) K de Schepper (France) V Millot	2	4
WC	(United States) B Fratangelo (Australia) G van Peperzeel	4	7^{7}	[10]
3	(United States) C Buchanan (Chinese Taipei) T Chen	6	6^{3}	[6]
(United States) J Jenkins (United States) B Klahn	4	7^{7}	[11]
2	(Spain) A Menéndez-Maceiras (Netherlands) B Westerhof	6	6^{5}	[9]

Semifinals
1	(Australia) R Junaid (Germany) F Moser	4	4
4	(United States) A Krajicek (United States) T Sandgren	6	6
WC	(United States) B Fratangelo (Australia) G van Peperzeel	4	7	[5]
(United States) J Jenkins (United States) B Klahn	6	5	[10]

Final
4	(United States) A Krajicek (United States) T Sandgren	7^{7}	6^{5}	[10]
(United States) J Jenkins (United States) B Klahn	6^{2}	7^{7}	[5]
