= 2014 BNP Paribas de Nouvelle-Calédonie =

- Date: 30 December 2013 – 5 January 2014
- Edition: 11th
- Draw: 32S / 16D
- Prize money: $75,000+H
- Surface: Hard
- Location: Nouméa, New Caledonia

Champions

Singles
- (Colombia) Alejandro Falla

Doubles
- (United States) Austin Krajicek / (United States) Tennys Sandgren
← 2013 ·	BNP Paribas de Nouvelle-Calédonie	· 2015 →

The 2014 BNP Paribas de Nouvelle-Calédonie was a professional tennis tournament played on hard courts. It was the eleventh edition of the tournament which was part of the 2014 ATP Challenger Tour. It took place in Nouméa, New Caledonia between 30 December 2013 and 5 January 2014.

== Singles main-draw entrants ==
=== Seeds ===
Country	Player	Rank^{1}	Seed
COL	Alejandro Falla	99	1
NED	Jesse Huta Galung	101	2
SVK	Martin Kližan	108	3
BEL	David Goffin	110	4
USA	Denis Kudla	114	5
ESP	Pere Riba	126	6
CAN	Peter Polansky	141	7
BEL	Ruben Bemelmans	148	8

- ^{1} Rankings are as of December 24, 2013.

=== Other entrants ===
The following players received wildcards into the singles main draw:

- (France) Enzo Couacaud
- (France) Albano Olivetti
- (New Zealand) Jose Statham

The following players received entry from the qualifying draw:

- (Belgium) Kimmer Coppejans
- (United States) Austin Krajicek
- (Chinese Taipei) Huang Liang-Chi
- (Croatia) Ante Pavić

The following players received entry as a lucky loser:

- (Ukraine) Denys Molchanov

== Champions ==
=== Singles ===
- (Colombia) Alejandro Falla def. (Canada) Steven Diez 6–2, 6–2

=== Doubles ===
- (United States) Austin Krajicek / (United States) Tennys Sandgren def. (Croatia) Ante Pavić / (Slovenia) Blaž Rola 7–6^{(7–4)}, 6–4
