= 2016 BNP Paribas de Nouvelle-Calédonie – Singles =

Singles
- 2016 BNP Paribas de Nouvelle-Calédonie

Final
- Champion: (France) Adrian Mannarino
- Runner-up: (Colombia) Alejandro Falla
- Score: 5–7, 6–2, 6–2

Events
Singles	Doubles
- BNP Paribas de Nouvelle-Calédonie

Steve Darcis was the defending champion but decided not to defend his title.
Top seed Adrian Mannarino won his 11th Challenger Tour title, beating Alejandro Falla 5–7, 6–2, 6–2

== Seeds ==
1. (France) Adrian Mannarino (champion)
2. (Colombia) Alejandro Falla (final)
3. (France) Édouard Roger-Vasselin (second round)
4. (Spain) Adrián Menéndez-Maceiras (first round)
5. (Slovenia) Blaž Rola (second round)
6. (Australia) Jordan Thompson (semifinals)
7. (Germany) Daniel Brands (semifinals)
8. (Switzerland) Henri Laaksonen (first round)

== Draw ==
Key

- Q = Qualifier
- WC = Wild card
- LL = Lucky loser
- Alt = Alternate
- ITF = ITF entry
- PR = Protected ranking
- SR = Special ranking
- SE = Special exempt
- JE = Junior exempt
- JR = Junior Accelerator Programme entrant
- CO = College Accelerator Programme entrant
- NG = Next Gen Accelerator Program entrant
- w/o = Walkover
- r = Retired
- d = Defaulted

=== Finals ===
Semifinals
1/WC	(France) Adrian Mannarino	6	6
7	(Germany) Daniel Brands	3	4
6	(Australia) Jordan Thompson	1	4
2	(Colombia) Alejandro Falla	6	6

Final
1/WC	(France) Adrian Mannarino	5	6	6
2	(Colombia) Alejandro Falla	7	2	2

=== Top half ===
First round
1/WC	(France) A Mannarino	6	6
(Italy) F Gaio	0	4
WC	(France) M Janvier	7^{7}	5	7
WC	(France) N N'Godrela	6^{4}	7	5
(Republic of Ireland) J McGee	6	6
(France) G Barrère	4	4
(Australia) L Saville	3	4
5	(Slovenia) B Rola	6	6
4	(Spain) A Menéndez-Maceiras	1	6^{5}
(France) Q Halys	6	7^{7}
(Austria) B Trinker	3	3
(Italy) A Giannessi	6	6
(France) C Hemery	2	2
(Czech Republic) J Mertl	6	6
Q	(Australia) Isaac Frost	3	6^{7}
7	(Germany) D Brands	6	7^{9}

Second round
1/WC	(France) A Mannarino	7	7
WC	(France) M Janvier	5	5
(Republic of Ireland) J McGee	7^{7}	4	7
5	(Slovenia) B Rola	6^{5}	6	5
(France) Q Halys	6	7
(Italy) A Giannessi	3	5
(Czech Republic) J Mertl	3	6^{0}
7	(Germany) D Brands	6	7^{7}

Quarterfinals
1/WC	(France) A Mannarino	6	6
(Republic of Ireland) J McGee	2	2
(France) Q Halys	2	4
7	(Germany) D Brands	6	6

Semifinals
1/WC	(France) A Mannarino	6	6
7	(Germany) D Brands	3	4

=== Bottom half ===
First round
6	(Australia) J Thompson	7^{7}	6
(Barbados) D King	6^{5}	1
(Spain) J Samper-Montaña	6	5	2
(United States) Connor Smith	0	7	6
(Argentina) M Trungelliti	7	6^{4}	7^{7}
Q	(Germany) M Marterer	5	7^{7}	6^{2}
(France) M Chazal	2	4
3	(France) É Roger-Vasselin	6	6
8	(Switzerland) H Laaksonen	5	5
(France) M Bourgue	7	7
Q	(France) Florian Reynet	3	6^{6}
WC	(France) J Benneteau	6	7^{8}
(France) T Lamasine	7^{7}	6
Q	(Italy) S Napolitano	6^{1}	4
(United States) M Krueger	6	4	4
2	(Colombia) A Falla	1	6	6

Second round
6	(Australia) J Thompson	7^{7}	6
(United States) C Smith	6^{3}	2
(Argentina) M Trungelliti	7^{7}	6
3	(France) É Roger-Vasselin	6^{5}	4
(France) M Bourgue	5	5
WC	(France) J Benneteau	7	7
(France) T Lamasine	2	2
2	(Colombia) A Falla	6	6

Quarterfinals
6	(Australia) J Thompson	6	6
(Argentina) M Trungelliti	4	2
WC	(France) J Benneteau	2	1
2	(Colombia) A Falla	6	6

Semifinals
6	(Australia) J Thompson	1	4
2	(Colombia) A Falla	6	6
