= 2015 Savannah Challenger – Doubles =

Doubles
- 2015 Savannah Challenger

Final
- Champions: (Argentina) Guillermo Durán (Argentina) Horacio Zeballos
- Runners-up: (United States) Dennis Novikov (Chile) Julio Peralta
- Score: 6–4, 6–3

Events
Singles	Doubles
- Savannah Challenger

Ilija Bozoljac and Michael Venus were the defending champions, but they did not participate this year.

Guillermo Durán and Horacio Zeballos won the title, defeating Dennis Novikov and Julio Peralta in the final, 6–4, 6–3.

== Seeds ==
1. (Argentina) Guillermo Durán / (Argentina) Horacio Zeballos (champions)
2. (France) Fabrice Martin / (India) Purav Raja (first round)
3. (United Kingdom) Ken Skupski / (United Kingdom) Neal Skupski (first round)
4. (Argentina) Facundo Argüello / (Argentina) Facundo Bagnis (semifinals)

== Draw ==
Key

- Q = Qualifier
- WC = Wild card
- LL = Lucky loser
- Alt = Alternate
- ITF = ITF entry
- PR = Protected ranking
- SR = Special ranking
- SE = Special exempt
- JE = Junior exempt
- JR = Junior Accelerator Programme entrant
- CO = College Accelerator Programme entrant
- NG = Next Gen Accelerator Program entrant
- w/o = Walkover
- r = Retired
- d = Defaulted

First round
1	(Argentina) G Durán (Argentina) H Zeballos	6	6
(United States) J Jenkins (United States) S Kozlov	3	2
(India) S Devvarman (India) S Singh	6^{2}	6^{5}
(United States) J Cerretani (Canada) F Dancevic	7^{7}	7^{7}
3	(United Kingdom) K Skupski (United Kingdom) N Skupski	3	6	[10]
(United Kingdom) L Bambridge (United Kingdom) L Broady	6	3	[12]
(Japan) Ryusei Makiguchi (Argentina) F Mena	6^{2}	7	[10]
(United States) B Fratangelo (United States) M Krueger	7^{7}	5	[8]
(United States) C Ball (Australia) M Reid	4	6	[10]
(Ecuador) E Gómez (Venezuela) R Rodríguez	6	3	[5]
(United States) T Paul (United Kingdom) A Ward	6	4	[8]
4	(Argentina) F Argüello (Argentina) F Bagnis	4	6	[10]
(Argentina) A Collarini (Argentina) R Olivo	6^{7}	7^{8}	[8]
(United States) A Kuznetsov (United States) T Sandgren	7^{9}	6^{6}	[10]
(United States) D Novikov (Chile) J Peralta	7	6
2	(France) F Martin (India) P Raja	5	4

Quarterfinals
1	(Argentina) G Durán (Argentina) H Zeballos	6	6
(United States) J Cerretani (Canada) F Dancevic	1	4
(United Kingdom) L Bambridge (United Kingdom) L Broady	6	7
(Japan) R Makiguchi (Argentina) F Mena	3	5
(United States) C Ball (Australia) M Reid	5	5
4	(Argentina) F Argüello (Argentina) F Bagnis	7	7
(United States) A Kuznetsov (United States) T Sandgren	3	7^{7}	[9]
(United States) D Novikov (Chile) J Peralta	6	6^{5}	[11]

Semifinals
1	(Argentina) G Durán (Argentina) H Zeballos	2	6	[10]
(United Kingdom) L Bambridge (United Kingdom) L Broady	6	4	[3]
4	(Argentina) F Argüello (Argentina) F Bagnis	5	3
(United States) D Novikov (Chile) J Peralta	7	6

Final
1	(Argentina) G Durán (Argentina) H Zeballos	6	6
(United States) D Novikov (Chile) J Peralta	4	3
