= 2015 BNP Paribas de Nouvelle-Calédonie =

Tennis tournament

- Date: 5–10 January
- Edition: 12th
- Draw: 32S / 16Q / 16D
- Prize money: $75,000+H
- Surface: Hard
- Location: Nouméa, New Caledonia

Champions

Singles
- (Belgium) Steve Darcis

Doubles
- (United States) Austin Krajicek / (United States) Tennys Sandgren
← 2014 ·	BNP Paribas de Nouvelle-Calédonie	· 2016 →

The 2015 BNP Paribas de Nouvelle-Calédonie was a professional tennis tournament played on hard courts. It was the twelfth edition of the tournament which was part of the 2015 ATP Challenger Tour. It took place in Nouméa, New Caledonia on 5–10 January 2015.

== Singles main-draw entrants ==
=== Seeds ===
Country	Player	Rank^{1}	Seed
FRA	Adrian Mannarino	44	1
FRA	Kenny de Schepper	106	2
ARG	Horacio Zeballos	123	3
TPE	Jimmy Wang	124	4
JPN	Yūichi Sugita	131	5
FRA	Stéphane Robert	134	6
ESP	Adrián Menéndez Maceiras	135	7
USA	Bradley Klahn	148	8

- ^{1} Rankings are as of December 22, 2014.

=== Other entrants ===
The following players received wildcards into the singles main draw:

- (France) Mathias Bourgue
- (France) Laurent Lokoli
- (France) Adrian Mannarino
- (France) Johan-Sébastien Tatlot

The following players received entry from the qualifying draw:

- (Brazil) Guilherme Clezar
- (United States) Jared Donaldson
- (United States) Bjorn Fratangelo
- (Argentina) Marco Trungelliti

== Champions ==
=== Singles ===
- (Belgium) Steve Darcis def. (Spain) Adrián Menéndez Maceiras 6–3, 6–2

=== Doubles ===
- (United States) Austin Krajicek / (United States) Tennys Sandgren def. (United States) Jarmere Jenkins / (United States) Bradley Klahn 7–6^{(7–2)}, 6–7^{(5–7)}, [10–5]
