= 2014 Kentucky Bank Tennis Championships – Women's singles =

Women's singles
- 2014 Kentucky Bank Tennis Championships

Final
- Champion: (United States) Madison Brengle
- Runner-up: (United States) Nicole Gibbs
- Score: 6–3, 6–4

Events
Singles	men	women
Doubles	men	women
- Kentucky Bank Tennis Championships

Shelby Rogers was the defending champion, but decided not to participate.

Madison Brengle won the title, defeating Nicole Gibbs in the final, 6–3, 6–4.

== Seeds ==
1. (Australia) Jarmila Gajdošová (quarterfinals)
2. (United States) Madison Brengle (champion)
3. (United States) Melanie Oudin (semifinals)
4. (Japan) Eri Hozumi (first round)
5. (United States) Irina Falconi (semifinals)
6. (Belgium) An-Sophie Mestach (second round)
7. (United States) Nicole Gibbs (final)
8. (Switzerland) Romina Oprandi (quarterfinals)

== Main draw ==
Key

- Q = Qualifier
- WC = Wild card
- LL = Lucky loser
- Alt = Alternate
- ITF = ITF entry
- PR = Protected ranking
- SR = Special ranking
- SE = Special exempt
- JE = Junior exempt
- JR = Junior Accelerator Programme entrant
- CO = College Accelerator Programme entrant
- NG = Next Gen Accelerator Program entrant
- w/o = Walkover
- r = Retired
- d = Defaulted

=== Finals ===
Semifinals
7	(United States) Nicole Gibbs	7	6
5	(United States) Irina Falconi	5	4
3	(United States) Melanie Oudin	2	6	4
2	(United States) Madison Brengle	6	3	6

Final
7	(United States) Nicole Gibbs	3	4
2	(United States) Madison Brengle	6	6

=== Top half ===
First round
1	(Australia) J Gajdošová	6	6
(Japan) M Hibi	3	3
WC	(United States) J Elbaba	7^{7}	1	6
(France) J Coin	6^{3}	6	3
(Japan) R Ozaki	2	4
Q	(United States) J Brady	6	6
Q	(United States) K Ahn	0	3
7	(United States) N Gibbs	6	6
4	(Japan) E Hozumi	4	1
(Japan) N Hibino	6	6
(Japan) H Kuwata	6	1	2
(Japan) M Imanishi	3	6	6
(Paraguay) M González	7	6
(United States) S Vickery	5	2
(Canada) H El Tabakh	3	2
5	(United States) I Falconi	6	6

Second round
1	(Australia) J Gajdošová	6	6
WC	(United States) J Elbaba	1	4
Q	(United States) J Brady	6	6^{7}	2
7	(United States) N Gibbs	3	7^{9}	6
(Japan) N Hibino	6	6
(Japan) M Imanishi	4	2
(Paraguay) M González	5	2
5	(United States) I Falconi	7	6

Quarterfinals
1	(Australia) J Gajdošová	1	3
7	(United States) N Gibbs	6	6
(Japan) N Hibino	2	7^{7}	4
5	(United States) I Falconi	6	6^{4}	6

Semifinals
7	(United States) N Gibbs	7	6
5	(United States) I Falconi	5	4

=== Bottom half ===
First round
6	(Belgium) A-S Mestach	6	1
(United Kingdom) S Murray	3	0^{r}
LL	(United Kingdom) E Webley-Smith	1	6^{5}
Q	(United States) M Sanchez	6	7^{7}
(Chinese Taipei) C-y Hsu	1	6	6
WC	(United States) J Loeb	6	0	4
WC	(United States) L Chirico	4	4
3	(United States) M Oudin	6	6
8	(Switzerland) R Oprandi	6	6
Q	(United States) A Mueller	3	4
(Brazil) L Pigossi	6	6
(France) S Foretz	4	2
(Australia) Ar Rodionova	4	5
PR	(Russia) D Gavrilova	6	7
WC	(United States) J Ditty	0	1
2	(United States) M Brengle	6	6

Second round
6	(Belgium) A-S Mestach	4	3
Q	(United States) M Sanchez	6	6
(Chinese Taipei) C-y Hsu	2	2
3	(United States) M Oudin	6	6
8	(Switzerland) R Oprandi	6	6
(Brazil) L Pigossi	2	4
PR	(Russia) D Gavrilova	4	6	2
2	(United States) M Brengle	6	4	6

Quarterfinals
Q	(United States) M Sanchez	6^{2}	1
3	(United States) M Oudin	7^{7}	6
8	(Switzerland) R Oprandi	4	2
2	(United States) M Brengle	6	6

Semifinals
3	(United States) M Oudin	2	6	4
2	(United States) M Brengle	6	3	6
