= 2014 Kentucky Bank Tennis Championships – Women's doubles =

Women's doubles
- 2014 Kentucky Bank Tennis Championships

Final
- Champions: (United Kingdom) Jocelyn Rae (United Kingdom) Anna Smith
- Runners-up: (Japan) Shuko Aoyama (United States) Keri Wong
- Score: 6–4, 6–4

Events
Singles	men	women
Doubles	men	women
- Kentucky Bank Tennis Championships

Nicha Lertpitaksinchai and Peangtarn Plipuech were the defending champions, having won the event in 2013, but both chose to participate in Phuket instead.

Jocelyn Rae and Anna Smith won the title, defeating Shuko Aoyama and Keri Wong in the final, 6–4, 6–4.

== Seeds ==
1. (Netherlands) ~~Michaëlla Krajicek~~ / (United States) ~~Maria Sanchez~~ (withdrew)
2. (Japan) Shuko Aoyama / (United States) Keri Wong (final)
3. (United Kingdom) Jocelyn Rae / (United Kingdom) Anna Smith (champions)
4. (United States) Asia Muhammad / (United States) Melanie Oudin (first round)

== Draw ==
Key

- Q = Qualifier
- WC = Wild card
- LL = Lucky loser
- Alt = Alternate
- ITF = ITF entry
- PR = Protected ranking
- SR = Special ranking
- SE = Special exempt
- JE = Junior exempt
- JR = Junior Accelerator Programme entrant
- CO = College Accelerator Programme entrant
- NG = Next Gen Accelerator Program entrant
- w/o = Walkover
- r = Retired
- d = Defaulted

First round
Alt	(United States) M Brengle (Japan) M Hibi	6^{1}	4
(United States) J Cako (United States) N Pluskota	7^{7}	6
WC	(United States) K Ahn (United States) K Christian	6	1	[10]
(Japan) N Hibino (Japan) E Hozumi	4	6	[6]
3	(United Kingdom) J Rae (United Kingdom) A Smith	6	6
(United States) D Lao (Canada) C Zhao	2	4
(Japan) H Kuwata (Japan) R Sawayangi	4	6^{2}
(France) S Foretz (United Kingdom) E Webley-Smith	6	7^{7}
(Poland) J Jegiołka (Russia) M Shamayko	4	6	[5]
Alt	(United States) J Loeb (United States) A Weinhold	6	4	[10]
(Chinese Taipei) C-y Hsu (United States) A Mueller	6^{5}	6	[10]
4	(United States) A Muhammad (United States) M Oudin	7^{7}	3	[6]
(Paraguay) M González (Brazil) L Pigossi	6	4	[10]
(United States) A Bhargava (United States) D Muresan	2	6	[4]
WC	(France) E Morin Kougoucheff (United States) CC Witten	6^{3}	3
2	(Japan) S Aoyama (United States) K Wong	7^{7}	6

Quarterfinals
(United States) J Cako (United States) N Pluskota	3	6	[4]
WC	(United States) K Ahn (United States) K Christian	6	2	[10]
3	(United Kingdom) J Rae (United Kingdom) A Smith	6	7
(France) S Foretz (United Kingdom) E Webley-Smith	1	5
Alt	(United States) J Loeb (United States) A Weinhold	6	6
(Chinese Taipei) C-y Hsu (United States) A Mueller	4	2
(Paraguay) M González (Brazil) L Pigossi	3	3
2	(Japan) S Aoyama (United States) K Wong	6	6

Semifinals
WC	(United States) K Ahn (United States) K Christian	3	2
3	(United Kingdom) J Rae (United Kingdom) A Smith	6	6
Alt	(United States) J Loeb (United States) A Weinhold	1	4
2	(Japan) S Aoyama (United States) K Wong	6	6

Final
3	(United Kingdom) J Rae (United Kingdom) A Smith	6	6
2	(Japan) S Aoyama (United States) K Wong	4	4
