= 2015 Savannah Challenger – Singles =

Singles
- 2015 Savannah Challenger

Final
- Champion: (South Korea) Chung Hyeon
- Runner-up: (Republic of Ireland) James McGee
- Score: 6–3, 6–2

Events
Singles	Doubles
- Savannah Challenger

Nick Kyrgios was the defending champion, but he did not participate this year. He played in Barcelona during this week.

Chung Hyeon won the title, defeating James McGee in the final, 6–3, 6–2.

== Seeds ==
1. (United States) Tim Smyczek (quarterfinals)
2. (Belgium) Ruben Bemelmans (first round)
3. (Argentina) Facundo Bagnis (first round)
4. (South Korea) Chung Hyeon (champion)
5. (Portugal) Gastão Elias (quarterfinals)
6. (Canada) Frank Dancevic (second round)
7. (Argentina) Horacio Zeballos (first round)
8. (Japan) Yoshihito Nishioka (second round)

== Draw ==
Key

- Q = Qualifier
- WC = Wild card
- LL = Lucky loser
- Alt = Alternate
- ITF = ITF entry
- PR = Protected ranking
- SR = Special ranking
- SE = Special exempt
- JE = Junior exempt
- JR = Junior Accelerator Programme entrant
- CO = College Accelerator Programme entrant
- NG = Next Gen Accelerator Program entrant
- w/o = Walkover
- r = Retired
- d = Defaulted

=== Finals ===
Semifinals
(Republic of Ireland) James McGee	6	1	6
WC	(United States) Frances Tiafoe	1	6	3
4	(South Korea) Chung Hyeon	6	6
(United States) Bjorn Fratangelo	2	4

Final
(Republic of Ireland) James McGee	3	2
4	(South Korea) Chung Hyeon	6	6

=== Top half ===
First round
1	(United States) T Smyczek	6	6
WC	(United States) S Kozlov	4	1
Q	(Argentina) G Durán	5	6	6^{7}
PR	(United States) T Sandgren	7	4	7^{9}
(Republic of Ireland) J McGee	6	6
(Argentina) R Olivo	3	1
(United States) R Ginepri	4	1
8	(Japan) Y Nishioka	6	6
3	(Argentina) F Bagnis	5	2
(United Kingdom) L Broady	7	6
Alt	(United States) M Krueger	6	6
(United States) J Jenkins	2	4
(France) V Millot	6	4	6^{3}
WC	(United States) F Tiafoe	2	6	7^{7}
(United States) A Kuznetsov	4	4
6	(Canada) F Dancevic	6	6

Second round
1	(United States) T Smyczek	6	3	6
PR	(United States) T Sandgren	1	6	0
(Republic of Ireland) J McGee	7^{7}	6
8	(Japan) Y Nishioka	6^{5}	4
(United Kingdom) L Broady	6	4	4
Alt	(United States) M Krueger	1	6	6
WC	(United States) F Tiafoe	2	6	6
6	(Canada) F Dancevic	6	4	2

Quarterfinals
1	(United States) T Smyczek	0	3
(Republic of Ireland) J McGee	6	6
Alt	(United States) M Krueger	2	6^{3}
WC	(United States) F Tiafoe	6	7^{7}

Semifinals
(Republic of Ireland) J McGee	6	1	6
WC	(United States) F Tiafoe	1	6	3

=== Bottom half ===
First round
5	(Portugal) G Elias	6	2	6
(India) S Devvarman	1	6	1
Q	(India) S Singh	6	6
WC	(United States) R Williams	3	2
Q	(Chile) J Peralta	5	6	6
(United States) D Novikov	7	3	1
LL	(Zimbabwe) T Garanganga	7^{8}	3	1
4	(South Korea) H Chung	6^{6}	6	6
7	(Argentina) H Zeballos	4	3
(Argentina) F Argüello	6	6
(Australia) J Kubler	4	3
(United States) J Donaldson	6	6
(United States) B Fratangelo	6	6
WC	(United States) E Escobedo	4	1
Q	(United States) T Paul	7^{8}	6^{5}	6
2	(Belgium) R Bemelmans	6^{6}	7^{7}	3

Second round
5	(Portugal) G Elias	7^{8}	6
Q	(India) S Singh	6^{6}	4
Q	(Chile) J Peralta	4	2
4	(South Korea) H Chung	6	6
(Argentina) F Argüello	6	1	4
(United States) J Donaldson	1	6	6
(United States) B Fratangelo	6	6
Q	(United States) T Paul	2	1

Quarterfinals
5	(Portugal) G Elias	2	4
4	(South Korea) H Chung	6	6
(United States) J Donaldson	7^{8}	3	0
(United States) B Fratangelo	6^{6}	6	6

Semifinals
4	(South Korea) H Chung	6	6
(United States) B Fratangelo	2	4
