= 2014 BNP Paribas de Nouvelle-Calédonie – Singles =

Singles
- 2014 BNP Paribas de Nouvelle-Calédonie

Final
- Champion: (Colombia) Alejandro Falla
- Runner-up: (Canada) Steven Diez
- Score: 6–2, 6–2

Events
| Singles | Doubles |
| ← 2013 · | BNP Paribas de Nouvelle-Calédonie | · 2015 → |

Adrian Mannarino was the defending champion but decided not to participate.

Falla won the title, defeating Steven Diez in the final, 6–2, 6–2.

== Seeds ==
1. (Colombia) Alejandro Falla (champion)
2. (Netherlands) Jesse Huta Galung (second round)
3. (Slovakia) Martin Kližan (first round)
4. (Belgium) David Goffin (second round, retired)
5. (United States) Denis Kudla (quarterfinals)
6. (Spain) Pere Riba (second round)
7. (Canada) Peter Polansky (second round)
8. (Belgium) Ruben Bemelmans (second round)

== Draw ==
=== Key ===
- Q = Qualifier
- WC = Wild card
- LL = Lucky loser
- Alt = Alternate
- SE = Special exempt
- PR = Protected ranking
- ITF = ITF entry
- JE = Junior exempt
- w/o = Walkover
- r = Retired
- d = Defaulted
- SR = Special ranking

=== Finals ===
Semifinals
1 | (Colombia) Alejandro Falla | 6 | 4 | 6
(Spain) Adrián Menéndez-Maceiras | 1 | 6 | 2
(Republic of Ireland) James McGee | 7^{7} | 5 | 4
(Canada) Steven Diez | 6^{2} | 7 | 6

Final
1 | (Colombia) Alejandro Falla | 6 | 6
(Canada) Steven Diez | 2 | 2

=== Top half ===
First round
1 | (Colombia) A Falla | 6 | 6
WC | (France) A Olivetti | 3 | 2
WC | (New Zealand) J Statham | 7^{7} | 4 | 6
(United States) S Johnson | 6^{4} | 6 | 3
Q | (Chinese Taipei) L-C Huang | 3 | 6^{5}
Q | (Croatia) A Pavić | 6 | 7^{7}
(Israel) A Weintraub | 1 | 5
5 | (United States) D Kudla | 6 | 7
3 | (Slovakia) M Kližan | 6 | 3 | 2
Q | (Belgium) K Coppejans | 2 | 6 | 6
WC | (France) E Couacaud | 5 | 3
(France) L Pouille | 7 | 6
(Czech Republic) J Mertl | 7^{7} | 4 | 3
(Spain) A Menéndez-Maceiras | 6^{3} | 6 | 6
(Belgium) G Gigounon | 2 | 4
7 | (Canada) P Polansky | 6 | 6

Second round
1 | (Colombia) A Falla | 6 | 6
(New Zealand) J Statham | 1 | 1
(Croatia) A Pavić | 2 | 5
5 | (United States) D Kudla | 6 | 7
(Belgium) K Coppejans | 5 | 6^{7}
(France) L Pouille | 7 | 7^{9}
(Spain) A Menéndez-Maceiras | 6 | 5 | 7^{7}
7 | (Canada) P Polansky | 2 | 7 | 6^{5}

Quarterfinals
1 | (Colombia) A Falla | 6 | 6
5 | (United States) D Kudla | 2 | 4
(France) L Pouille | 4 | 6^{1}
(Spain) A Menéndez-Maceiras | 6 | 7^{7}

Semifinals
1 | (Colombia) A Falla | 6 | 4 | 6
(Spain) A Menéndez-Maceiras | 1 | 6 | 2

=== Bottom half ===
First round
8 | (Belgium) R Bemelmans | 6 | 7^{7}
(France) M Teixeira | 2 | 6^{2}
(Republic of Ireland) J McGee | 6 | 6
(Spain) J Samper-Montaña | 3 | 3
(United States) T Sandgren | 4 | 7^{7} | 5
Q | (United States) A Krajicek | 6 | 6^{3} | 7
(Spain) G Granollers | 1 | 0
4 | (Belgium) D Goffin | 6 | 6
6 | (Spain) P Riba | 6 | 7
(France) D Guez | 2 | 5
(Canada) S Diez | 1 | 7 | 6
(Slovenia) B Rola | 6 | 5 | 3
(France) G Burquier | 6^{6} | 6 | 6
LL | (Ukraine) D Molchanov | 7^{8} | 4 | 4
(Italy) A Arnaboldi | 5 | 1
2 | (Netherlands) J Huta Galung | 7 | 6

Second round
9 | (Belgium) R Bemelmans | 3 | 3
(Republic of Ireland) J McGee | 6 | 6
Q | (United States) A Krajicek | 3
4 | (Belgium) D Goffin | 1^{r}
6 | (Spain) P Riba | 1 | 3
(Canada) S Diez | 6 | 6
(France) G Burquier | 4 | 6 | 6
2 | (Netherlands) J Huta Galung | 6 | 3 | 0

Quarterfinals
(Republic of Ireland) J McGee | 4 | 6 | 6
Q | (United States) A Krajicek | 6 | 2 | 0
(Canada) S Diez | 7^{7} | 6
(France) G Burquier | 6^{2} | 0

Semifinals
(Republic of Ireland) J McGee | 7^{7} | 5 | 4
(Canada) S Diez | 6^{2} | 7 | 6
