= 2015 Cary Challenger =

- Date: 13–20 September
- Edition: 1st
- Draw: 32S / 16D
- Prize money: $50,000
- Surface: Hard
- Location: Cary, United States

Champions

Singles
- (United States) Dennis Novikov

Doubles
- (United States) Chase Buchanan / (Slovenia) Blaž Rola
Cary Challenger	· 2016 →

The 2015 Cary Challenger was a professional tennis tournament played on hard courts. It was the 1st edition of the tournament which was part of the 2015 ATP Challenger Tour. It took place in Cary, North Carolina, United States between 13 and 20 September 2015.

== Singles main-draw entrants ==
=== Seeds ===
Country	Player	Rank^{1}	Seed
USA	Bjorn Fratangelo	113	1
USA	Austin Krajicek	117	2
AUS	John-Patrick Smith	122	3
SLO	Blaž Rola	129	4
USA	Ryan Harrison	133	5
GBR	Brydan Klein	179	6
USA	Dennis Novikov	204	7
USA	Connor Smith	212	8

- ^{1} Rankings are as of September 7, 2015

=== Other entrants ===
The following players received wildcards into the singles main draw:

- (Peru) Nicolás Álvarez
- (United States) Ryan Harrison
- (United States) Robbie Mudge
- (Canada) Brayden Schnur

The following players received entry from the qualifying draw:

- (South Africa) Damon Gooch
- (Australia) Nicholas Horton
- (United States) Ronnie Schneider
- (United States) Wil Spencer

The following player received entry as a lucky loser:

- (Switzerland) Keivon Tabrizi

The following players received entry as protected rankings:

- (United States) Dennis Nevolo
- (Canada) Peter Polansky

== Champions ==
=== Singles ===
- (United States) Dennis Novikov def. (United States) Ryan Harrison 6–4, 7–5

=== Doubles ===
- (United States) Chase Buchanan / (Slovenia) Blaž Rola def. (United States) Austin Krajicek / (United States) Nicholas Monroe 6–4, 6–7^{{5–7}}, [10–4]
