= 2017 Australian Open – Men's singles qualifying =

Men's singles qualifying
- 2017 Australian Open

Events
Singles	men	women		boys	girls
Doubles	men	women	mixed	boys	girls
WC Singles	men	women	quad
WC Doubles	men	women	quad
Legends	men	women	mixed

Qualification
Singles	men	women
- Australian Open

This article displays the qualifying draw for the men's singles at the 2017 Australian Open.

== Draw ==
=== Seeds ===
1. (Czech Republic) Radek Štěpánek (qualified)
2. (United States) Frances Tiafoe (qualified)
3. (Slovakia) Jozef Kovalík (first round)
4. (Japan) Yūichi Sugita (second round)
5. (Argentina) Nicolás Kicker (first round)
6. (United States) Bjorn Fratangelo (qualified)
7. (United States) Stefan Kozlov (first round)
8. (Germany) Benjamin Becker (first round)
9. (Brazil) João Souza (first round)
10. (Slovakia) Lukáš Lacko (qualified)
11. (Russia) Evgeny Donskoy (qualifying competition)
12. (Italy) Alessandro Giannessi (first round)
13. (Japan) Taro Daniel (second round)
14. (Germany) Tobias Kamke (second round)
15. (Romania) Marius Copil (first round)
16. (Switzerland) Marco Chiudinelli (first round)
17. (Belgium) Arthur De Greef (first round)
18. (United States) Denis Kudla (qualifying competition)
19. (Canada) Vasek Pospisil (first round)
20. (United States) Rajeev Ram (qualifying competition)
21. (United States) Ernesto Escobedo (qualified)
22. (Canada) Peter Polansky (qualifying competition, lucky loser)
23. (Switzerland) Henri Laaksonen (first round)
24. (Slovakia) Andrej Martin (first round)
25. (United States) Tim Smyczek (qualifying competition)
26. (France) Julien Benneteau (qualifying competition)
27. (Slovakia) Norbert Gombos (first round)
28. (Russia) Teymuraz Gabashvili (first round)
29. (Japan) Go Soeda (qualified)
30. (France) Vincent Millot (second round)
31. (Italy) Thomas Fabbiano (qualified)
32. (Spain) Roberto Carballés Baena (second round)

=== Qualifiers ===
1. (Czech Republic) Radek Štěpánek
2. (United States) Frances Tiafoe
3. (Japan) Go Soeda
4. (Russia) Andrey Rublev
5. (Kazakhstan) Alexander Bublik
6. (United States) Bjorn Fratangelo
7. (United States) Ernesto Escobedo
8. (Croatia) Ivan Dodig
9. (Italy) Thomas Fabbiano
10. (Slovakia) Lukáš Lacko
11. (United States) Noah Rubin
12. (Italy) Luca Vanni
13. (Austria) Jürgen Melzer
14. (Australia) Blake Mott
15. (Australia) Alex Bolt
16. (United States) Reilly Opelka

=== Lucky loser ===
1. (Canada) Peter Polansky

=== Draw ===
==== First qualifier ====
First round
1	(Czech Republic) Radek Štěpánek	6	6^{2}	6
(United States) Sekou Bangoura	3	7^{7}	2
(Italy) Matteo Donati	2	3^{r}
(Slovenia) Blaž Kavčič	6	3
(Australia) John-Patrick Smith	7^{8}	6
(Argentina) Agustín Velotti	6^{6}	3
(France) Kenny de Schepper	6	5	9
27	(Slovakia) Norbert Gombos	4	7	7

Second round
1	(Czech Republic) Radek Štěpánek	6	6^{4}	8
(Slovenia) Blaž Kavčič	3	7^{7}	6
(Australia) John-Patrick Smith	6	6
(France) Kenny de Schepper	4	3

Qualifying competition
1	(Czech Republic) Radek Štěpánek	6	6
(Australia) John-Patrick Smith	2	4

==== Second qualifier ====
First round
2	(United States) Frances Tiafoe	6	5	7
(Italy) Marco Cecchinato	3	7	5
(Canada) Steven Diez	3	6	4
(Belgium) Yannik Reuter	6	2	6
(Portugal) Pedro Sousa	6^{2}	4
(Egypt) Mohamed Safwat	7^{7}	6
(Spain) Jordi Samper-Montaña	3	3
25	(United States) Tim Smyczek	6	6

Second round
2	(United States) Frances Tiafoe	6	6
(Belgium) Yannik Reuter	4	0
(Egypt) Mohamed Safwat	4	3
25	(United States) Tim Smyczek	6	6

Qualifying competition
2	(United States) Frances Tiafoe	3	6	7
25	(United States) Tim Smyczek	6	0	5

==== Third qualifier ====
First round
3	(Slovakia) Jozef Kovalík	3	3
(Argentina) Marco Trungelliti	6	6
(Germany) Peter Gojowczyk	6	6
(India) Saketh Myneni	0	2
(Germany) Daniel Brands	6	6^{7}	4
(Spain) Adrián Menéndez-Maceiras	3	7^{9}	6
(Belgium) Ruben Bemelmans	6^{10}	3
29	(Japan) Go Soeda	7^{12}	6

Second round
(Argentina) Marco Trungelliti	5
(Germany) Peter Gojowczyk	0^{r}
(Spain) Adrián Menéndez-Maceiras	6	4	5
29	(Japan) Go Soeda	3	6	7

Qualifying competition
(Argentina) Marco Trungelliti	2	6	4
29	(Japan) Go Soeda	6	3	6

==== Fourth qualifier ====
First round
4	(Japan) Yūichi Sugita	6	6
(Australia) Marc Polmans	1	1
WC	(Australia) Max Purcell	4	7^{8}	1
(Russia) Andrey Rublev	6	6^{6}	6
(Italy) Lorenzo Giustino	6	3	2
(Bosnia and Herzegovina) Mirza Bašić	3	6	6
(France) Tristan Lamasine	2	4
22	(Canada) Peter Polansky	6	6

Second round
4	(Japan) Yūichi Sugita	4	6^{2}
(Russia) Andrey Rublev	6	7^{7}
(Bosnia and Herzegovina) Mirza Bašić	4	3
22	(Canada) Peter Polansky	6	6

Qualifying competition
(Russia) Andrey Rublev	6	4	6
22	(Canada) Peter Polansky	4	6	3

==== Fifth qualifier ====
First round
5	(Argentina) Nicolás Kicker	7	5	1
(South Korea) Lee Duck-hee	5	7	6
(Hungary) Márton Fucsovics	6	0	4
WC	(Australia) Bradley Mousley	3	6	6
(Belgium) Kimmer Coppejans	6	7^{7}
(United States) Tennys Sandgren	1	6^{5}
(Kazakhstan) Alexander Bublik	5	6	8
17	(Belgium) Arthur De Greef	7	3	6

Second round
(South Korea) Lee Duck-hee	6^{5}	6	6
WC	(Australia) Bradley Mousley	7^{7}	0	2
(Belgium) Kimmer Coppejans	7^{7}	4	2
(Kazakhstan) Alexander Bublik	6^{2}	6	6

Qualifying competition
(South Korea) Lee Duck-hee	6	4	4
(Kazakhstan) Alexander Bublik	4	6	6

==== Sixth qualifier ====
First round
6	(United States) Bjorn Fratangelo	6	7^{7}
(Slovenia) Grega Žemlja	4	6^{3}
WC	(Australia) Gavin van Peperzeel	2	1
(Greece) Stefanos Tsitsipas	6	6
(Japan) Hiroki Moriya	6	6
WC	(Australia) Harry Bourchier	2	3
(Belarus) Uladzimir Ignatik	3	6	6
19	(Canada) Vasek Pospisil	6	3	4

Second round
6	(United States) Bjorn Fratangelo	4	6	6
(Greece) Stefanos Tsitsipas	6	1	3
(Japan) Hiroki Moriya	4	6	6
(Belarus) Uladzimir Ignatik	6	2	3

Qualifying competition
6	(United States) Bjorn Fratangelo	4	6	6
(Japan) Hiroki Moriya	6	4	4

==== Seventh qualifier ====
First round
7	(United States) Stefan Kozlov	1	4
PR	(India) Yuki Bhambri	6	6
(Serbia) Peđa Krstin	3	6	7
(Czech Republic) Zdeněk Kolář	6	1	5
(Germany) Daniel Masur	4	6^{5}
(Japan) Tatsuma Ito	6	7^{7}
(Germany) Maximilian Marterer	6^{5}	5
21	(United States) Ernesto Escobedo	7^{7}	7

Second round
PR	(India) Yuki Bhambri	6	6
(Serbia) Peđa Krstin	3	4
(Japan) Tatsuma Ito	1	3
21	(United States) Ernesto Escobedo	6	6

Qualifying competition
PR	(India) Yuki Bhambri	7^{7}	2	4
21	(United States) Ernesto Escobedo	6^{2}	6	6

==== Eighth qualifier ====
First round
8	(Germany) Benjamin Becker	4	7	8
(Serbia) Miljan Zekić	6	5	10
WC	(Australia) Maverick Banes	1	1
(China) Wu Di	6	6
(Croatia) Ivan Dodig	6	6
(Israel) Amir Weintraub	2	2
(Serbia) Laslo Đere	6	6
24	(Slovakia) Andrej Martin	0	2

Second round
(Serbia) Miljan Zekić	4	2
(China) Wu Di	6	6
(Croatia) Ivan Dodig	6	1	6
(Serbia) Laslo Đere	3	6	2

Qualifying competition
(China) Wu Di	1	5
(Croatia) Ivan Dodig	6	7

==== Ninth qualifier ====
First round
9	(Brazil) João Souza	2	7	6
(Brazil) André Ghem	6	5	8
(Japan) Yuya Kibi	6	7^{7}
(United States) Brian Baker	3	6^{4}
(Sweden) Elias Ymer	3	6^{4}
(Japan) Akira Santillan	6	7^{7}
PR	(United States) Bradley Klahn	4	7^{7}	3
31	(Italy) Thomas Fabbiano	6	6^{3}	6

Second round
(Brazil) André Ghem	2	6	6
(Japan) Yuya Kibi	6	3	1
(Japan) Akira Santillan	6	4	2
31	(Italy) Thomas Fabbiano	4	6	6

Qualifying competition
(Brazil) André Ghem	4	6^{4}
31	(Italy) Thomas Fabbiano	6	7^{7}

==== Tenth qualifier ====
First round
10	(Slovakia) Lukáš Lacko	6	6
(Germany) Jeremy Jahn	2	3
(Spain) Enrique López-Pérez	6^{4}	6^{4}
(Argentina) Máximo González	7^{7}	7^{7}
(Dominican Republic) José Hernández-Fernández	2	2
(Barbados) Darian King	6	6
WC	(Australia) Luke Saville	4	5
18	(United States) Denis Kudla	6	7

Second round
10	(Slovakia) Lukáš Lacko	4	6	6
(Argentina) Máximo González	6	2	2
(Barbados) Darian King	6	4	4
18	(United States) Denis Kudla	4	6	6

Qualifying competition
10	(Slovakia) Lukáš Lacko	6	6
18	(United States) Denis Kudla	2	2

==== Eleventh qualifier ====
First round
11	(Russia) Evgeny Donskoy	3	6	9
(Kazakhstan) Dmitry Popko	6	1	7
PR	(Australia) Matthew Ebden	6	6
(Kazakhstan) Andrey Golubev	1	2
(United States) Noah Rubin	5	6	6
PR	(Germany) Cedrik-Marcel Stebe	7	4	4
(Australia) Marinko Matosevic	4	2
32	(Spain) Roberto Carballés Baena	6	6

Second round
11	(Russia) Evgeny Donskoy	7^{7}	4	6
PR	(Australia) Matthew Ebden	6^{3}	6	2
(United States) Noah Rubin	6	3	6
32	(Spain) Roberto Carballés Baena	4	6	2

Qualifying competition
11	(Russia) Evgeny Donskoy	2	4
(United States) Noah Rubin	6	6

==== Twelfth qualifier ====
First round
12	(Italy) Alessandro Giannessi	6^{6}	6^{4}
(Czech Republic) Jan Šátral	7^{8}	7^{7}
(Japan) Yasutaka Uchiyama	6	7^{7}
(Serbia) Marko Tepavac	4	6^{2}
(Italy) Federico Gaio	7	2	3
(Italy) Luca Vanni	5	6	6
(United States) Alexander Sarkissian	6	6
23	(Switzerland) Henri Laaksonen	4	1

Second round
(Czech Republic) Jan Šátral	7^{8}	1	9
(Japan) Yasutaka Uchiyama	6^{6}	6	7
(Italy) Luca Vanni	3	6	6
(United States) Alexander Sarkissian	6	3	2

Qualifying competition
(Czech Republic) Jan Šátral	6	4	4
(Italy) Luca Vanni	4	6	6

==== Thirteenth qualifier ====
First round
13	(Japan) Taro Daniel	7	6
(Bosnia and Herzegovina) Aldin Šetkić	5	4
PR	(Austria) Jürgen Melzer	6	3	6
(Belgium) Joris De Loore	2	6	3
WC	(Australia) Scott Jones	2	2
(El Salvador) Marcelo Arévalo	6	6
(Belarus) Ilya Ivashka	4	4
20	(United States) Rajeev Ram	6	6

Second round
13	(Japan) Taro Daniel	3	2
PR	(Austria) Jürgen Melzer	6	6
(El Salvador) Marcelo Arévalo	1	6	6
20	(United States) Rajeev Ram	6	4	8

Qualifying competition
PR	(Austria) Jürgen Melzer	6	3	6
20	(United States) Rajeev Ram	2	6	3

==== Fourteenth qualifier ====
First round
14	(Germany) Tobias Kamke	7^{7}	6
(United States) Dennis Novikov	6^{5}	4
(Russia) Alexander Kudryavtsev	1	2
WC	(Australia) Blake Mott	6	6
PR	(Croatia) Matija Pecotić	6^{3}	5
(Republic of Ireland) James McGee	7^{7}	7
(Italy) Riccardo Bellotti	3	1
30	(France) Vincent Millot	6	6

Second round
14	(Germany) Tobias Kamke	2	4
WC	(Australia) Blake Mott	6	6
(Republic of Ireland) James McGee	6	6
30	(France) Vincent Millot	2	4

Qualifying competition
WC	(Australia) Blake Mott	7^{7}	3	6
(Republic of Ireland) James McGee	6^{5}	6	3

==== Fifteenth qualifier ====
First round
15	(Romania) Marius Copil	7^{7}	4	4
WC	(Australia) Alex Bolt	6^{2}	6	6
PR	(Germany) Matthias Bachinger	7^{8}	6
(Croatia) Franko Škugor	6^{6}	3
(Croatia) Kristijan Mesaroš	2	1
(Brazil) Guilherme Clezar	6	6
(Serbia) Nikola Milojević	3	3
26	(France) Julien Benneteau	6	6

Second round
WC	(Australia) Alex Bolt	6	7^{7}
PR	(Germany) Matthias Bachinger	4	6^{5}
(Brazil) Guilherme Clezar	5	0
26	(France) Julien Benneteau	7	6

Qualifying competition
WC	(Australia) Alex Bolt	6	7
26	(France) Julien Benneteau	3	5

==== Sixteenth qualifier ====
First round
16	(Switzerland) Marco Chiudinelli	6	4	3
(United States) Mitchell Krueger	1	6	6
(United States) Reilly Opelka	7	6
(Italy) Stefano Napolitano	5	3
(France) Mathias Bourgue	6	3	2
(France) Jonathan Eysseric	1	6	6
(Norway) Casper Ruud	6	6
28	(Russia) Teymuraz Gabashvili	4	4

Second round
(United States) Mitchell Krueger	3	6^{2}
(United States) Reilly Opelka	6	7^{7}
(France) Jonathan Eysseric	3	6	3
(Norway) Casper Ruud	6	3	6

Qualifying competition
(United States) Reilly Opelka	7^{7}	6
(Norway) Casper Ruud	6^{2}	3
