= 2016 Cary Challenger – Singles =

Singles
- 2016 Cary Challenger

Final
- Champion: (Republic of Ireland) James McGee
- Runner-up: (United States) Ernesto Escobedo
- Score: 1–6, 6–1, 6–4

Events
Singles	Doubles
- Cary Challenger

Dennis Novikov was the defending champion but lost in the semifinals to James McGee.

McGee won the title after defeating Ernesto Escobedo 1–6, 6–1, 6–4 in the final.

== Seeds ==
1. (United States) Dennis Novikov (semifinals)
2. (United States) Frances Tiafoe (semifinals)
3. (United States) Austin Krajicek (first round)
4. (United States) Stefan Kozlov (quarterfinals)
5. (Canada) Peter Polansky (quarterfinals)
6. (Barbados) Darian King (second round)
7. (El Salvador) Marcelo Arévalo (first round)
8. (United States) Ernesto Escobedo (final)

== Draw ==
Key

- Q = Qualifier
- WC = Wild card
- LL = Lucky loser
- Alt = Alternate
- ITF = ITF entry
- PR = Protected ranking
- SR = Special ranking
- SE = Special exempt
- JE = Junior exempt
- JR = Junior Accelerator Programme entrant
- CO = College Accelerator Programme entrant
- NG = Next Gen Accelerator Program entrant
- w/o = Walkover
- r = Retired
- d = Defaulted

=== Finals ===
Semifinals
1	(United States) Dennis Novikov	6	3	3
Q	(Republic of Ireland) James McGee	3	6	6
8	(United States) Ernesto Escobedo	6	6^{5}	7^{7}
2	(United States) Frances Tiafoe	3	7^{7}	6^{2}

Final
Q	(Republic of Ireland) James McGee	1	6	6
8	(United States) Ernesto Escobedo	6	1	4

=== Top half ===
First round
1	(United States) D Novikov	7^{8}	6
(Latvia) M Lībietis	6^{6}	4
(United Kingdom) B Klein	1	7	6
(United States) S Bangoura	6	5	2
(Ecuador) E Gómez	6	6
WC	(United States) Nick Stachowiak	1	3
(United States) M Krueger	3	2
5	(Canada) P Polansky	6	6
3	(United States) A Krajicek	6^{4}	5
WC	(Canada) B Schnur	7^{7}	7
(United States) E Quigley	7	6
(Ecuador) R Quiroz	5	3
Q	(Republic of Ireland) J McGee	7	7^{7}
(United States) E King	5	6^{3}
(South Africa) N Scholtz	4	4
6	(Barbados) D King	6	6

Second round
1	(United States) D Novikov	6	6
(United Kingdom) B Klein	4	4
(Ecuador) E Gómez	0	3
5	(Canada) P Polansky	6	6
WC	(Canada) B Schnur	7^{7}	6
(United States) E Quigley	6^{1}	1
Q	(Republic of Ireland) J McGee	6	6
6	(Barbados) D King	1	3

Quarterfinals
1	(United States) D Novikov	6	2	6
5	(Canada) P Polansky	3	6	4
WC	(Canada) B Schnur	2	4
Q	(Republic of Ireland) J McGee	6	6

Semifinals
1	(United States) D Novikov	6	3	3
Q	(Republic of Ireland) J McGee	3	6	6

=== Bottom half ===
First round
8	(United States) E Escobedo	6	6
WC	(Australia) Nicholas Horton	2	2
(United States) A El Mihdawy	2	6^{5}
WC	(United States) R Shane	6	7^{7}
(Canada) P Bester	7	6
(United States) N Meister	5	3
Q	(Italy) Erik Crepaldi	6	4	2
4	(United States) S Kozlov	3	6	6
7	(El Salvador) M Arévalo	4	3
(United Kingdom) C Norrie	6	6
(United States) T Sandgren	6	6
Q	(United States) M McDonald	4	3
(United States) T Paul	7	2	4
(United States) M Mmoh	5	6	6
Q	(United States) Ryan Haviland	6	3	6^{2}
2	(United States) F Tiafoe	3	6	7^{7}

Second round
8	(United States) E Escobedo	6	5	6
WC	(United States) R Shane	3	7	1
(Canada) P Bester	4	1
4	(United States) S Kozlov	6	6
(United Kingdom) C Norrie	6^{4}	3
(United States) T Sandgren	7^{7}	6
(United States) M Mmoh	7	4	4
2	(United States) F Tiafoe	5	6	6

Quarterfinals
8	(United States) E Escobedo	3	6	6
4	(United States) S Kozlov	6	1	2
(United States) T Sandgren	4	6	6^{5}
2	(United States) F Tiafoe	6	1	7^{7}

Semifinals
8	(United States) E Escobedo	6	6^{5}	7^{7}
2	(United States) F Tiafoe	3	7^{7}	6^{2}
