= 2016 Cary Challenger – Doubles =

Doubles
- 2016 Cary Challenger

Final
- Champions: (Canada) Philip Bester (Canada) Peter Polansky
- Runners-up: (United States) Stefan Kozlov (United States) Austin Krajicek
- Score: 6–2, 6–2

Events
Singles	Doubles
- Cary Challenger

Chase Buchanan and Blaž Rola were the defending champions but chose not to defend their title.

Philip Bester and Peter Polansky won the title after defeating Stefan Kozlov and Austin Krajicek 6–2, 6–2 in the final.

== Seeds ==
1. (Mexico) Miguel Ángel Reyes-Varela / (United States) Max Schnur (first round)
2. (Canada) Philip Bester / (Canada) Peter Polansky (champions)
3. (United States) Sekou Bangoura / (United States) Mitchell Krueger (quarterfinals)
4. (Australia) Steven de Waard / (United Kingdom) Brydan Klein (quarterfinals)

== Draw ==
Key

- Q = Qualifier
- WC = Wild card
- LL = Lucky loser
- Alt = Alternate
- ITF = ITF entry
- PR = Protected ranking
- SR = Special ranking
- SE = Special exempt
- JE = Junior exempt
- JR = Junior Accelerator Programme entrant
- CO = College Accelerator Programme entrant
- NG = Next Gen Accelerator Program entrant
- w/o = Walkover
- r = Retired
- d = Defaulted

First round
1	(Mexico) MÁ Reyes-Varela (United States) M Schnur	4	3
(United Kingdom) L Bambridge (New Zealand) B McLachlan	6	6
(United States) T Paul (United States) F Tiafoe	4	6	[10]
WC	(United States) Robert Kelly (United States) R Schneider	6	3	[6]
3	(United States) S Bangoura (United States) M Krueger	6	6
WC	(Montenegro) Ig Saveljić (Montenegro) Iv Saveljić	1	3
(United States) S Kozlov (United States) A Krajicek	7^{7}	6
(El Salvador) M Arévalo (Ecuador) E Gómez	6^{3}	4
(Republic of Ireland) D O'Hare (United Kingdom) J Salisbury	4	6^{6}
(United States) A El Mihdawy (Barbados) D King	6	7^{8}
WC	(United States) Robert Levine (United States) Nick Stachowiak	6^{1}	4
4	(Australia) S de Waard (United Kingdom) B Klein	7^{7}	6
(United States) N Meister (United States) E Quigley	6^{5}	6	[10]
(United States) M McDonald (United States) D Novikov	7^{7}	4	[7]
Q	(South Africa) N Scholtz (South Africa) T Vorster	6	3	[8]
2	(Canada) P Bester (Canada) P Polansky	4	6	[10]

Quarterfinals
(United Kingdom) L Bambridge (New Zealand) B McLachlan	7	5	[10]
(United States) T Paul (United States) F Tiafoe	5	7	[6]
3	(United States) S Bangoura (United States) M Krueger	3	5
(United States) S Kozlov (United States) A Krajicek	6	7
(United States) A El Mihdawy (Barbados) D King	7	5	[10]
4	(Australia) S de Waard (United Kingdom) B Klein	5	7	[7]
(United States) N Meister (United States) E Quigley	3	3
2	(Canada) P Bester (Canada) P Polansky	6	6

Semifinals
(United Kingdom) L Bambridge (New Zealand) B McLachlan	7^{8}	4	[9]
(United States) S Kozlov (United States) A Krajicek	6^{6}	6	[11]
(United States) A El Mihdawy (Barbados) D King	4	1
2	(Canada) P Bester (Canada) P Polansky	6	6

Final
(United States) S Kozlov (United States) A Krajicek	2	2
2	(Canada) P Bester (Canada) P Polansky	6	6
