= James McGee (tennis) =

Irish tennis player (born 1987)

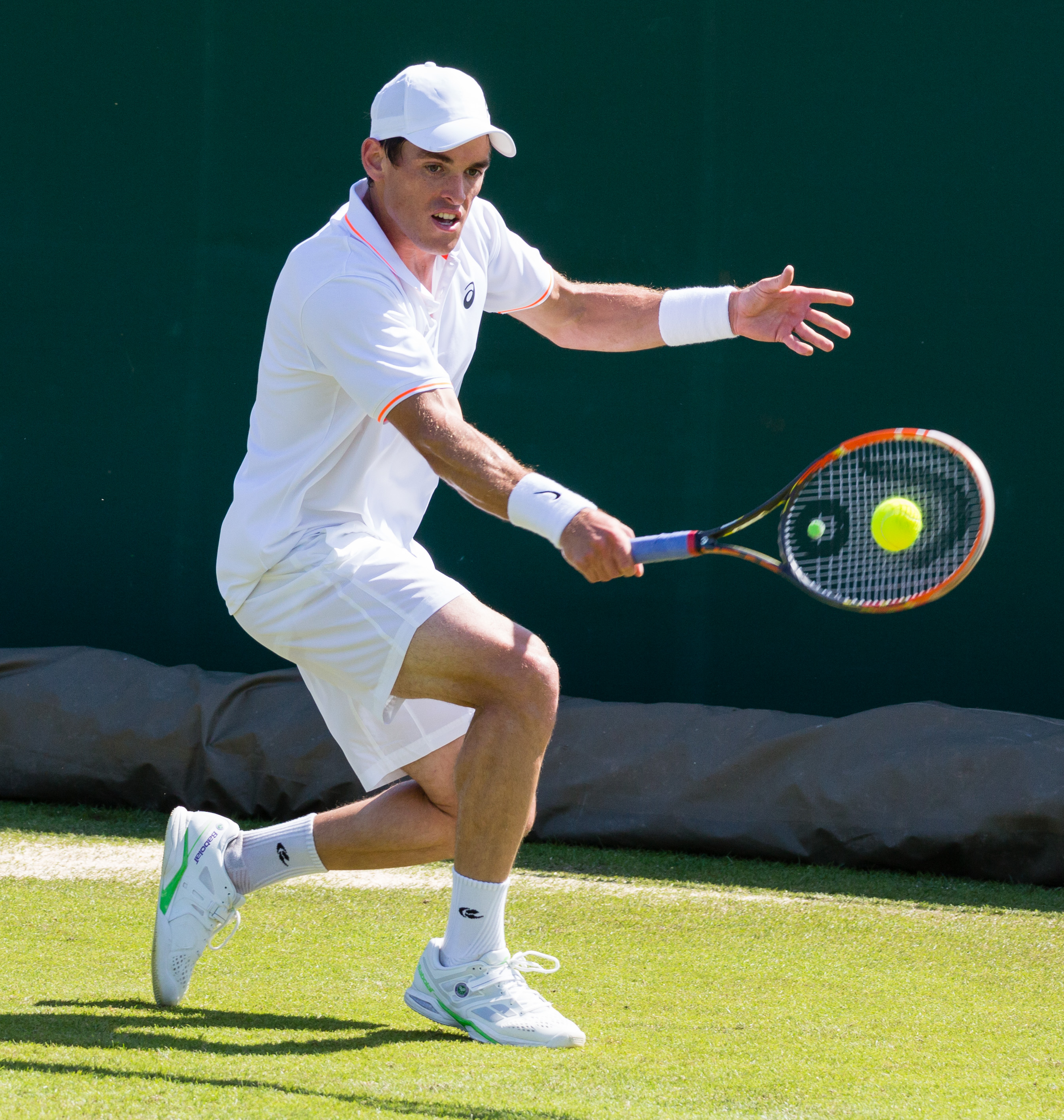
- Country (sports): Ireland
- Residence: Castleknock, Ireland
- Born: 10 June 1987 (age 38); Castleknock, Ireland
- Height: 1.83 m (6 ft 0 in)
- Turned pro: 2008
- Retired: 2017
- Plays: Right-handed (two-handed backhand)
- College: NC State
- Prize money: $380,510

Singles
- Career record: 9–10
- Career titles: 0
- Highest ranking: No. 146 (22 June 2015)

Grand Slam singles results
- Australian Open: Q3 (2016, 2017)
- French Open: Q3 (2014)
- Wimbledon: Q2 (2017)
- US Open: 1R (2014)

Doubles
- Career record: 4–4
- Career titles: 0
- Highest ranking: No. 430 (17 May 2010)
- Last updated on: 4 December 2017.

James McGee (born 10 June 1987) is an Irish former professional tennis player. He was born in Castleknock, Ireland. He attended Belvedere College in Dublin, County Dublin.

== Personal life ==
McGee was born to Kieran and Marie McGee. He started playing tennis at the age of seven at Castleknock. He won his school's tennis championship in 2002, 2003 and 2004, and was also awarded the Most Outstanding Player of the Year in Ireland in 2003. He was educated at Belvedere College in Dublin and then obtained a major in Psychology from North Carolina State University in 2008.

== Career ==
McGee has spent most of his career on the Futures and Challenger circuits. As of 9 June 2014, he had played in 10 Davis Cup ties for Ireland with a record of 13 wins and 8 losses (9–5 in singles & 4–3 in doubles).

=== 2014 ===
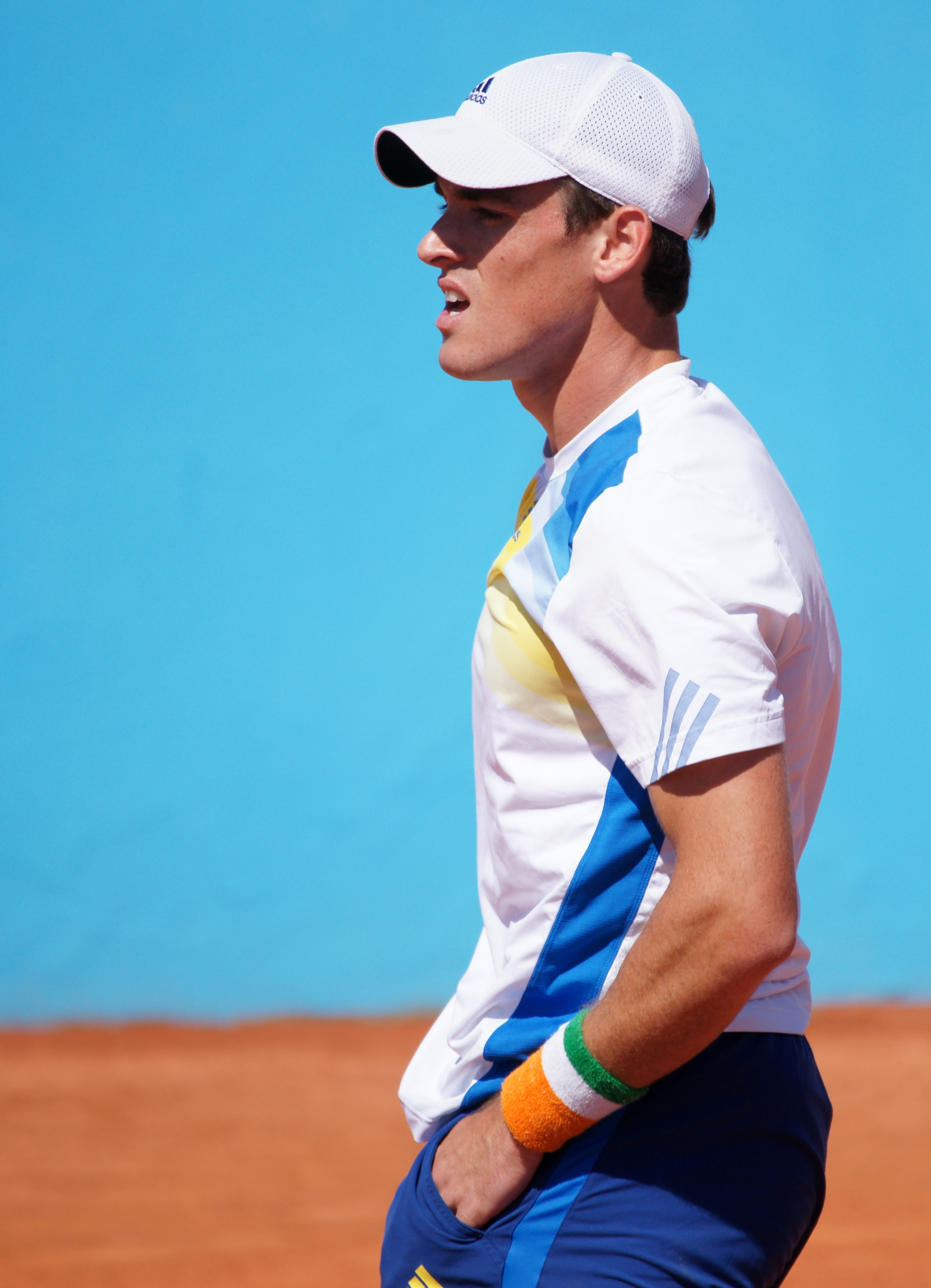
James McGee at the Nice Open 2014.

McGee had finished 2013 in good form and continued this into 2014, reaching the semi-finals of the BNP Paribas de Nouvelle-Calédonie in Nouméa, equalling his best performance at a challenger. He then competed in Australian Open qualifying but lost in his first match to eventual qualifier Jimmy Wang. McGee later recorded an impressive win over top 100 player Alex Bogomolov, Jr. at the Challenger of Dallas and then narrowly missed out on making his first ATP World Tour main draw the following week, losing in the final round of qualifying at the U.S. National Indoor Tennis Championships to David Goffin. In March, McGee played in qualifying for the BNP Paribas Open, an ATP World Tour Masters 1000 event, but was again defeated by Goffin. He then helped Ireland to a 3–2 victory over Egypt in the Davis Cup, winning both his singles rubbers in straight sets.

In late April, McGee once again equalled his best challenger result, reaching the semi-finals of the Tallahassee Tennis Challenger. He then went on to win his first ever Grand Slam qualifying match, defeating Norbert Gomboš at the French Open and then stunning Guido Pella in two sets in the following round. McGee, however, was unable to become the first Irish tennis player since Sean Sorensen, in 1982, to reach the French Open main draw, as he lost in straight sets to Andrea Arnaboldi. In early June, McGee once again reached the final round of qualifying for an ATP World Tour event, this time at the Queen's Club Championships, but came up just short in a tight three sets match against Daniel Brands. McGee next competed at Wimbledon qualifying but was defeated in straight sets by Aljaž Bedene.

McGee then travelled to North America for the summer hardcourt swing. He first competed at the Nielsen Pro Tennis Championships but lost out to Tim Smyczek in the second round. McGee then came his closest to making an ATP World Tour main draw at the Hall of Fame Tennis Championships, where he lost to Ante Pavić in a final set tie-break in the final qualifying round. He then reached the semi-finals of the Challenger Banque Nationale de Granby. This result saw him break into the top 200 of the rankings for the first time in his career, reaching a new high of 193. He also made the semi-finals of the doubles with Chase Buchanan. The following week, at the Kentucky Bank Tennis Championships, McGee defeated the number one seed Evgeny Donskoy in the opening round. He was eliminated at the quarter-final stage by 2011 champion Wayne Odesnik. In the doubles he again played with Chase Buchanan and the pair reached the final, the first challenger final of McGee's career, but they were defeated in straight sets. The following week he lost to Vincent Millot in the opening round of the Odlum Brown Vancouver Open.

McGee qualified for his first-ever grand slam main draw at the 2014 US Open after defeating Zhang Ze in the final round of qualifiers in 3 sets. He also defeated Gonzalo Lama and Yuki Bhambri during the qualifying stages. McGee faced Aleksandr Nedovyesov in the first round of the main draw where he lost in 4 sets. Despite this defeat, the prize money earned for reaching the first round accounted for more than a quarter of his career earnings to date.

== ATP Challenger and ITF Futures finals ==
=== Singles: 12 (5–7) ===
ATP Challenger (1–2)
ITF Futures (4–5)

Result	W–L	Date	Tournament	Tier	Surface	Opponent	Score
Loss	0–1	Oct 2008	Rethymno, Greece	Futures	Carpet	(Sweden) Daniel Danilovic	6–4, 4–6, 3–6
Loss	0–2	Jun 2011	Madrid, Spain	Futures	Hard	(Spain) Arnau Brugués-Davi	5–7, 7–6^{(7–3)}, 6–7^{(0–7)}
Loss	0–3	Jul 2011	Rabat, Morocco	Futures	Clay	(Morocco) Mehdi Ziadi	4–6, 4–6
Win	1–3	Jul 2011	Dublin, Ireland	Futures	Carpet	(France) Charles-Antoine Brezac	6–3, 6–3
Win	2–3	Mar 2012	Manama, Bahrain	Futures	Hard	(Spain) Jordi Samper-Montaña	6–4, 6–4
Win	3–3	Jun 2012	Melilla, Spain	Futures	Hard	(Egypt) Mohamed Safwat	6–3, 7–5
Loss	3–4	Jan 2013	Eilat, Israel	Futures	Hard	(Czech Republic) Jiří Veselý	2–6, 4–6
Loss	3–5	Feb 2013	Brownsville, United States	Futures	Hard	(South Africa) Rik de Voest	6–7^{(6–8)}, 1–6
Win	4–5	Aug 2013	Libreville, Gabon	Futures	Hard	(India) Jeevan Nedunchezhiyan	6–4, 7–6^{(7–4)}
Loss	0–1	Mar 2015	San Luis Potosí, Mexico	Challenger	Clay	(Argentina) Guido Pella	3–6, 3–6
Loss	0–2	Apr 2015	Savannah, United States	Challenger	Clay	(South Korea) Chung Hyeon	3–6, 2–6
Win	1–2	Sep 2016	Cary, United States	Challenger	Hard	(United States) Ernesto Escobedo	1–6, 6–1, 6–4

=== Doubles: 11 (5–6) ===
ATP Challenger (0–1)
ITF Futures (5–5)

Result	W–L	Date	Tournament	Tier	Surface	Partner	Opponents	Score
Win	1–0	Oct 2008	Rethymno, Greece	Futures	Carpet	(Romania) Ioan-Alexandru Cojanu	(Greece) Paris Gemouchidis (Romania) Bogdan-Victor Leonte	6–4, 6–2
Win	2–0	Feb 2009	Bergheim, Austria	Futures	Carpet (i)	(Czech Republic) Jiri Krkoska	(Germany) Kevin Deden (Germany) Bastian Knittel	6–3, 6–7^{(6–8)}, [10–4]
Win	3–0	May 2009	Newcastle, United Kingdom	Futures	Clay	(Republic of Ireland) Colin O'Brien	(United Kingdom) Nick Cavaday (Republic of Ireland) Barry King	6–4, 6–4
Loss	3–1	Aug 2009	Moscow, Russia	Futures	Clay	(Netherlands) Romano Frantzen	(Ukraine) Ivan Anikanov (Ukraine) Artem Smirnov	3–6, 4–6
Win	4–1	Nov 2009	Cardiff, United Kingdom	Futures	Hard (i)	(Republic of Ireland) Barry King	(United Kingdom) Tim Bradshaw (United Kingdom) Alexander Slabinsky	6–4, 7–6^{(7–3)}
Loss	4–2	Feb 2010	Sarajevo, Bosnia	Futures	Carpet	(Republic of Ireland) Colin O'Brien	(United Kingdom) Chris Eaton (United Kingdom) Dominic Inglot	walkover
Loss	4–3	Apr 2010	Angers, France	Futures	Clay (i)	(France) Olivier Charroin	(France) Charles-Antoine Brezac (France) Vincent Stouff	4–6, 1–6
Loss	4–4	Jul 2011	Dublin, Ireland	Futures	Carpet	(Republic of Ireland) James Cluskey	(France) Albano Olivetti (United Kingdom) Neal Skupski	6–7^{(4–7)}, 3–6
Win	5–4	Mar 2012	Manama, Bahrain	Futures	Hard	(Republic of Ireland) Sam Barry	(Germany) Jeremy Jahn (United Kingdom) Matthew Short	7–5, 4–6, [10–8]
Loss	5–5	Jul 2012	Dublin, Ireland	Futures	Carpet	(Spain) Jaime Pulgar-Garcia	(France) Albano Olivetti (France) Elie Rousset	3–6, 4–6
Loss	0–1	Jul 2014	Lexington, Mexico	Challenger	Hard	(United States) Chase Buchanan	(Canada) Peter Polansky (Canada) Adil Shamasdin	4–6, 2–6

== Singles performance timeline ==
Key
W	F	SF	QF	#R	RR	Q#	DNQ	A	NH

(W) winner; (F) finalist; (SF) semifinalist; (QF) quarterfinalist; (#R) rounds 4, 3, 2, 1; (RR) round-robin stage; (Q#) qualification round; (DNQ) did not qualify; (A) absent; (NH) not held; (SR) strike rate (events won / competed); (W–L) win–loss record.
To avoid confusion and double counting, these charts are updated at the conclusion of a tournament or when the player's participation has ended.

Tournament	2008	2009	2010	2011	2012	2013	2014	2015	2016	2017	2018	W–L
Grand Slam tournaments
Australian Open	A	A	A	A	A	A	Q1	Q2	Q3	Q3	A	0–0
French Open	A	A	A	A	A	A	Q3	Q1	A	Q1	A	0–0
Wimbledon	A	A	A	A	A	Q1	Q1	Q1	A	Q2	A	0–0
US Open	A	A	A	A	A	A	1R	A	A	Q1	A	0–1
Career statistics
Overall win–loss	0–0	0–1	2–2	1–0	3–0	1–2	2–1	0–3	0–1	0–0	0–0	9–10
Year-end ranking	579	514	655	364	346	242	200	202	194	366		
