= 2014 US Open – Men's singles qualifying =

Men's singles qualifying
- 2014 US Open

Events
Singles	men	women		boys	girls
Doubles	men	women	mixed	boys	girls
WC Singles	men	women	quad
WC Doubles	men	women	quad
Legends	men	women	mixed

Qualification
Singles	men	women
- US Open

== Seeds ==
1. (Tunisia) Malek Jaziri (second round)
2. (Japan) Go Soeda (first round)
3. (Serbia) Filip Krajinović (qualified)
4. (Argentina) Facundo Bagnis (qualified)
5. (Argentina) Horacio Zeballos (first round)
6. (Brazil) João Souza (first round)
7. (Germany) Andreas Beck (qualified)
8. (Lithuania) Ričardas Berankis (qualifying competition)
9. (Germany) Peter Gojowczyk (qualified)
10. (Canada) Peter Polansky (qualifying competition)
11. (Japan) Tatsuma Ito (qualified)
12. (Japan) Yūichi Sugita (qualifying competition)
13. (Slovakia) Norbert Gomboš (first round)
14. (United States) Michael Russell (second round)
15. (United Kingdom) James Ward (qualifying competition)
16. (Chinese Taipei) Jimmy Wang (qualifying competition)
17. (Slovenia) Aljaž Bedene (qualifying competition)
18. (Uzbekistan) Farrukh Dustov (first round)
19. (Netherlands) Thiemo de Bakker (first round, retired)
20. (France) Pierre-Hugues Herbert (first round)
21. (Croatia) Ante Pavić (first round)
22. (Poland) Michał Przysiężny (qualifying competition)
23. (Portugal) Gastão Elias (second round)
24. (India) Somdev Devvarman (first round)
25. (Turkey) Marsel İlhan (qualifying competition)
26. (Austria) Gerald Melzer (first round)
27. (Russia) Alexander Kudryavtsev (qualified)
28. (United States) Rajeev Ram (qualifying competition)
29. (Japan) Hiroki Moriya (qualifying competition)
30. (India) Yuki Bhambri (second round)
31. (Hungary) Márton Fucsovics (second round)
32. (Slovakia) Andrej Martin (second round)

== Qualifiers ==
1. (Switzerland) Marco Chiudinelli
2. (Belgium) Niels Desein
3. (Serbia) Filip Krajinović
4. (Argentina) Facundo Bagnis
5. (Japan) Yoshihito Nishioka
6. (Ukraine) Illya Marchenko
7. (Germany) Andreas Beck
8. (Russia) Alexander Kudryavtsev
9. (Germany) Peter Gojowczyk
10. (Japan) Taro Daniel
11. (Japan) Tatsuma Ito
12. (Germany) Matthias Bachinger
13. (Republic of Ireland) James McGee
14. (Belgium) Steve Darcis
15. (Moldova) Radu Albot
16. (Croatia) Borna Ćorić

== Draw ==
=== First qualifier ===
First round
1	(Tunisia) Malek Jaziri	3	6	7
(United States) Chase Buchanan	6	2	5
(Switzerland) Marco Chiudinelli	6	7^{7}
PR	(Ukraine) Sergei Bubka	2	6^{3}
(Belgium) Ruben Bemelmans	6	6^{4}	6
(Australia) Benjamin Mitchell	2	7^{7}	1
(Belarus) Uladzimir Ignatik	6	6^{3}	2
29	(Japan) Hiroki Moriya	1	7^{7}	6

Second round
1	(Tunisia) Malek Jaziri	3	7^{7}	1
(Switzerland) Marco Chiudinelli	6	6^{3}	6
(Belgium) Ruben Bemelmans	6	4	3
29	(Japan) Hiroki Moriya	3	6	6

Qualifying competition
(Switzerland) Marco Chiudinelli	6	6^{6}	6
29	(Japan) Hiroki Moriya	1	7^{8}	1

=== Second qualifier ===
First round
2	(Japan) Go Soeda	3	3
PR	(Spain) Óscar Hernández	6	6
(Argentina) Guido Andreozzi	3	6	7^{7}
(Brazil) André Ghem	6	1	6^{3}
(France) Martin Vaïsse	6	5	4
(Belgium) Niels Desein	3	7	6
(Republic of Ireland) Louk Sorensen	6	3	4
23	(Portugal) Gastão Elias	4	6	6

Second round
PR	(Spain) Óscar Hernández	6	1	6
(Argentina) Guido Andreozzi	3	6	4
(Belgium) Niels Desein	7^{7}	7^{7}
23	(Portugal) Gastão Elias	6^{4}	6^{0}

Qualifying competition
PR	(Spain) Óscar Hernández	6^{4}	3
(Belgium) Niels Desein	7^{7}	6

=== Third qualifier ===
First round
3	(Serbia) Filip Krajinović	6	6
(United Kingdom) Daniel Cox	3	3
(Czech Republic) Jaroslav Pospíšil	6	5	3
(Italy) Marco Cecchinato	4	7	6
(France) Marc Gicquel	4	4
(Netherlands) Jesse Huta Galung	6	6
(Argentina) Juan Ignacio Londero	6	5	6
21	(Croatia) Ante Pavić	3	7	1

Second round
3	(Serbia) Filip Krajinović	6	6
(Italy) Marco Cecchinato	4	4
(Netherlands) Jesse Huta Galung	5	1^{r}
(Argentina) Juan Ignacio Londero	7	3

Qualifying competition
3	(Serbia) Filip Krajinović	7	6
(Argentina) Juan Ignacio Londero	5	2

=== Fourth qualifier ===
First round
4	(Argentina) Facundo Bagnis	6	6
(Australia) Alex Bolt	3	4
(Italy) Roberto Marcora	6	3	6
(Serbia) Peđa Krstin	3	6	3
(Australia) James Duckworth	6	5	6
(France) Axel Michon	3	7	2
WC	(United States) Ernesto Escobedo	6	6
24	(India) Somdev Devvarman	3	2

Second round
4	(Argentina) Facundo Bagnis	6^{4}	6	6
(Italy) Roberto Marcora	7^{7}	4	2
(Australia) James Duckworth	2	6^{3}
WC	(United States) Ernesto Escobedo	6	7^{7}

Qualifying competition
4	(Argentina) Facundo Bagnis	7^{7}	6
WC	(United States) Ernesto Escobedo	6^{3}	1

=== Fifth qualifier ===
First round
5	(Argentina) Horacio Zeballos	4	4
(Japan) Yoshihito Nishioka	6	6
(Croatia) Nikola Mektić	3	6	4
(Australia) Thanasi Kokkinakis	6	4	6
(Japan) Yasutaka Uchiyama	4	4
(Germany) Alexander Zverev	6	6
(Russia) Valery Rudnev	3	1
25	(Turkey) Marsel İlhan	6	6

Second round
(Japan) Yoshihito Nishioka	7	4	6
(Australia) Thanasi Kokkinakis	5	6	4
(Germany) Alexander Zverev	6	5	6^{5}
25	(Turkey) Marsel İlhan	4	7	7^{7}

Qualifying competition
(Japan) Yoshihito Nishioka	6	6
25	(Turkey) Marsel İlhan	3	1

=== Sixth qualifier ===
First round
6	(Brazil) João Souza	4	4
(Ukraine) Illya Marchenko	6	6
WC	(United States) Taylor Harry Fritz	6	3	3
(Czech Republic) Jan Mertl	1	6	6
PR	(Germany) Philipp Petzschner	6	7^{7}
(Chile) Hans Podlipnik Castillo	4	6^{3}
(China) Wu Di	6	6
26	(Austria) Gerald Melzer	2	2

Second round
(Ukraine) Illya Marchenko	6	6
(Czech Republic) Jan Mertl	3	1
PR	(Germany) Philipp Petzschner	6	3	2
(China) Wu Di	1	6	6

Qualifying competition
(Ukraine) Illya Marchenko	6	6
(China) Wu Di	1	3

=== Seventh qualifier ===
First round
7	(Germany) Andreas Beck	6	6
WC	(France) Mathias Bourgue	3	3
(Italy) Flavio Cipolla	1	6^{3}
WC	(India) Sanam Singh	6	7^{7}
(Spain) Roberto Carballés Baena	5	3
(United States) Rhyne Williams	7	6
(Austria) Martin Fischer	4	4
28	(United States) Rajeev Ram	6	6

Second round
7	(Germany) Andreas Beck	5	7^{7}	6
WC	(India) Sanam Singh	7	6^{3}	3
(United States) Rhyne Williams	3	2
28	(United States) Rajeev Ram	6	6

Qualifying competition
7	(Germany) Andreas Beck	6	6^{5}	7^{7}
28	(United States) Rajeev Ram	2	7^{7}	6^{5}

=== Eighth qualifier ===
First round
8	(Lithuania) Ričardas Berankis	6	6
WC	(United States) Mackenzie McDonald	3	2
(Italy) Luca Vanni	4	2
WC	(United States) Collin Altamirano	6	6
(Argentina) Martín Alund	6	3	6
(Brazil) Guilherme Clezar	4	6	3
(Italy) Thomas Fabbiano	6^{2}	6^{4}
27	(Russia) Alexander Kudryavtsev	7^{7}	7^{7}

Second round
8	(Lithuania) Ričardas Berankis	2	6	6
WC	(United States) Collin Altamirano	6	1	1
(Argentina) Martín Alund	3	3
27	(Russia) Alexander Kudryavtsev	6	6

Qualifying competition
8	(Lithuania) Ričardas Berankis	5	6	3
27	(Russia) Alexander Kudryavtsev	7	0	6

=== Ninth qualifier ===
First round
9	(Germany) Peter Gojowczyk	6	6
(Australia) Matt Reid	2	2
(Ukraine) Denys Molchanov	3	7^{7}	6
(Romania) Marius Copil	6	6^{2}	2
(Georgia (country)) Nikoloz Basilashvili	4	6	7
(Belarus) Egor Gerasimov	6	4	5
(Switzerland) Yann Marti	2	3
17	(Slovenia) Aljaž Bedene	6	6

Second round
9	(Germany) Peter Gojowczyk	7	6
(Ukraine) Denys Molchanov	5	3
(Georgia (country)) Nikoloz Basilashvili	3	3
17	(Slovenia) Aljaž Bedene	6	6

Qualifying competition
9	(Germany) Peter Gojowczyk	3	6	6
17	(Slovenia) Aljaž Bedene	6	4	3

=== Tenth qualifier ===
First round
10	(Canada) Peter Polansky	4	7	6
PR	(United States) Tennys Sandgren	6	5	2
(Italy) Andrea Arnaboldi	4	4
(Slovakia) Miloslav Mečíř Jr.	6	6
(United States) Alex Kuznetsov	6	6^{7}	1
(Japan) Taro Daniel	4	7^{9}	6
(Croatia) Toni Androić	6	6
18	(Uzbekistan) Farrukh Dustov	3	3

Second round
10	(Canada) Peter Polansky	6	6
(Slovakia) Miloslav Mečíř Jr.	4	2
(Japan) Taro Daniel	6	2	6
(Croatia) Toni Androić	2	6	1

Qualifying competition
10	(Canada) Peter Polansky	6	5	3
(Japan) Taro Daniel	4	7	6

=== Eleventh qualifier ===
First round
11	(Japan) Tatsuma Ito	7^{8}	4	6
WC	(United States) Frances Tiafoe	6^{6}	6	3
(Belgium) Kimmer Coppejans	2	4
(Russia) Alex Bogomolov Jr.	6	6
(United Kingdom) Daniel Smethurst	1	2
(Russia) Konstantin Kravchuk	6	6
(Italy) Stefano Travaglia	6^{5}	7^{7}	6^{6}
22	(Poland) Michał Przysiężny	7^{7}	6^{5}	7^{8}

Second round
11	(Japan) Tatsuma Ito	6	6
(Russia) Alex Bogomolov Jr.	3	2
(Russia) Konstantin Kravchuk	4	1
22	(Poland) Michał Przysiężny	6	6

Qualifying competition
11	(Japan) Tatsuma Ito	6	6
22	(Poland) Michał Przysiężny	4	4

=== Twelfth qualifier ===
First round
12	(Japan) Yūichi Sugita	6	6
(Germany) Tim Pütz	3	4
PR	(Portugal) Pedro Sousa	1	5
(Spain) Adrián Menéndez Maceiras	6	7
(Germany) Matthias Bachinger	6	6
(Argentina) Andrea Collarini	3	2
(Italy) Matteo Viola	6^{5}	6	7^{7}
20	(France) Pierre-Hugues Herbert	7^{7}	3	6^{5}

Second round
12	(Japan) Yūichi Sugita	1	7	6
(Spain) Adrián Menéndez Maceiras	6	5	3
(Germany) Matthias Bachinger	6	6
(Italy) Matteo Viola	2	3

Qualifying competition
12	(Japan) Yūichi Sugita	3	1
(Germany) Matthias Bachinger	6	6

=== Thirteenth qualifier ===
First round
13	(Slovakia) Norbert Gomboš	4	3
(United States) Austin Krajicek	6	6
(China) Zhang Ze	6	6
(Croatia) Mate Delić	2	2
(Republic of Ireland) James McGee	6	6
(Chile) Gonzalo Lama	1	1
(Lithuania) Laurynas Grigelis	4	1
30	(India) Yuki Bhambri	6	6

Second round
(United States) Austin Krajicek	6^{2}	6	2
(China) Zhang Ze	7^{7}	4	6
(Republic of Ireland) James McGee	5	6	7
30	(India) Yuki Bhambri	7	2	5

Qualifying competition
(China) Zhang Ze	6	4	4
(Republic of Ireland) James McGee	0	6	6

=== Fourteenth qualifier ===
First round
14	(United States) Michael Russell	6	6
(Spain) Enrique López Pérez	1	4
PR	(Spain) Íñigo Cervantes	0	6^{5}
PR	(Belgium) Steve Darcis	6	7^{7}
(Ecuador) Emilio Gómez	6	3	6
(Australia) John-Patrick Smith	1	6	3
(Brazil) Rogério Dutra Silva	6^{3}	1
32	(Slovakia) Andrej Martin	7^{7}	6

Second round
14	(United States) Michael Russell	4	3
PR	(Belgium) Steve Darcis	6	6
(Ecuador) Emilio Gómez	4	6	6
32	(Slovakia) Andrej Martin	6	4	3

Qualifying competition
PR	(Belgium) Steve Darcis	6	2
(Ecuador) Emilio Gómez	1	0^{r}

=== Fifteenth qualifier ===
First round
15	(United Kingdom) James Ward	6	6
(Bosnia and Herzegovina) Aldin Šetkić	2	2
(Argentina) Guido Pella	4	6	2
(France) Vincent Millot	6	3	6
(Moldova) Radu Albot	6	6
(France) Grégoire Burquier	1	3
(Serbia) Ilija Bozoljac	6^{8}	6^{5}
31	(Hungary) Márton Fucsovics	7^{10}	7^{7}

Second round
15	(United Kingdom) James Ward	6	6
(France) Vincent Millot	4	4
(Moldova) Radu Albot	6	3	6
31	(Hungary) Márton Fucsovics	4	6	0

Qualifying competition
15	(United Kingdom) James Ward	1	6	2
(Moldova) Radu Albot	6	3	6

=== Sixteenth qualifier ===
First round
16	(Chinese Taipei) Jimmy Wang	4	7^{11}	6
(United Kingdom) Daniel Evans	6	6^{9}	2
(Argentina) Agustín Velotti	6^{4}	2
(South Korea) Chung Hyeon	7^{7}	6
WC	(United States) Mitchell Frank	6	0	2
WC	(United States) Stefan Kozlov	3	6	6
(Croatia) Borna Ćorić	1
19	(Netherlands) Thiemo de Bakker	0^{r}

Second round
16	(Chinese Taipei) Jimmy Wang	6	6
(South Korea) Chung Hyeon	1	1
WC	(United States) Stefan Kozlov	6	2	2
(Croatia) Borna Ćorić	2	6	6

Qualifying competition
16	(Chinese Taipei) Jimmy Wang	6^{4}	1
(Croatia) Borna Ćorić	7^{7}	6
