= 2014 US Open – Women's singles qualifying =

Women's singles qualifying
- 2014 US Open

Events
Singles	men	women		boys	girls
Doubles	men	women	mixed	boys	girls
WC Singles	men	women	quad
WC Doubles	men	women	quad
Legends	men	women	mixed

Qualification
Singles	men	women
- US Open

== Seeds ==
1. (Spain) Lara Arruabarrena (qualifying competition)
2. (Thailand) Luksika Kumkhum (second round)
3. (Germany) Anna-Lena Friedsam (qualifying competition)
4. (Portugal) Michelle Larcher de Brito (second round)
5. (Montenegro) Danka Kovinić (first round)
6. (Australia) Olivia Rogowska (second round)
7. (United States) Anna Tatishvili (first round)
8. (Austria) Tamira Paszek (second round)
9. (France) Claire Feuerstein (first round)
10. (Czech Republic) Kateřina Siniaková (qualifying competition)
11. (Croatia) Ana Konjuh (first round)
12. (Luxembourg) Mandy Minella (first round)
13. (Croatia) Mirjana Lučić-Baroni (qualified)
14. (Russia) Alexandra Panova (qualifying competition)
15. (Serbia) Jovana Jakšić (second round)
16. (Belarus) Aliaksandra Sasnovich (qualified)
17. (Spain) Lourdes Domínguez Lino (first round)
18. (Russia) Ksenia Pervak (qualified)
19. (Ukraine) Lesia Tsurenko (qualified)
20. (Kazakhstan) Yulia Putintseva (second round)
21. (Ukraine) Maryna Zanevska (qualified)
22. (Germany) Dinah Pfizenmaier (second round)
23. (Slovakia) Kristína Kučová (first round)
24. (Sweden) Sofia Arvidsson (first round)
25. (Paraguay) Verónica Cepede Royg (qualifying competition)
26. (United States) Melanie Oudin (qualifying competition)
27. (Russia) Alla Kudryavtseva (qualified)
28. (United States) Allie Kiick (first round, retired)
29. (China) Wang Qiang (qualified)
30. (Turkey) Çağla Büyükakçay (second round)
31. (United States) Sachia Vickery (first round)
32. (Serbia) Aleksandra Krunić (qualified)

== Qualifiers ==
1. (China) Wang Qiang
2. (Ukraine) Maryna Zanevska
3. (Ukraine) Lesia Tsurenko
4. (Russia) Alla Kudryavtseva
5. (Australia) Ashleigh Barty
6. (Russia) Ksenia Pervak
7. (Canada) Françoise Abanda
8. (China) Duan Yingying
9. (Tunisia) Ons Jabeur
10. (Serbia) Aleksandra Krunić
11. (Australia) Anastasia Rodionova
12. (Chinese Taipei) Chan Yung-jan
13. (Croatia) Mirjana Lučić-Baroni
14. (Poland) Paula Kania
15. (China) Zheng Saisai
16. (Belarus) Aliaksandra Sasnovich

== Qualifying draw ==
Key

- Q = Qualifier
- WC = Wild card
- LL = Lucky loser
- Alt = Alternate
- ITF = ITF entry
- PR = Protected ranking
- SR = Special ranking
- SE = Special exempt
- JE = Junior exempt
- JR = Junior Accelerator Programme entrant
- CO = College Accelerator Programme entrant
- NG = Next Gen Accelerator Program entrant
- w/o = Walkover
- r = Retired
- d = Defaulted

=== First qualifier ===
First round
1	(Spain) Lara Arruabarrena	7^{9}	6
(Japan) Risa Ozaki	6^{7}	0
(Netherlands) Michaëlla Krajicek	6	6
(Serbia) Vesna Dolonc	1	4
(Slovenia) Nastja Kolar	5	3
(Czech Republic) Kateřina Vaňková	7	6
(Russia) Evgeniya Rodina	3	6	2
29	(China) Wang Qiang	6	4	6

Second round
1	(Spain) Lara Arruabarrena	6^{3}	6	6
(Netherlands) Michaëlla Krajicek	7^{7}	3	4
(Czech Republic) Kateřina Vaňková	1	5
29	(China) Wang Qiang	6	7

Qualifying competition
1	(Spain) Lara Arruabarrena	6	5	3
29	(China) Wang Qiang	0	7	6

=== Second qualifier ===
First round
2	(Thailand) Luksika Kumkhum	6	6
(Japan) Hiroko Kuwata	3	4
(Germany) Carina Witthöft	2	7	6
WC	(United States) Jennifer Brady	6	5	3
(Liechtenstein) Stephanie Vogt	6	6
(Ukraine) Anastasiya Vasylyeva	4	0
(Russia) Polina Vinogradova	6	1	5
21	(Ukraine) Maryna Zanevska	3	6	7

Second round
2	(Thailand) Luksika Kumkhum	3	4
(Germany) Carina Witthöft	6	6
(Liechtenstein) Stephanie Vogt	6^{3}	2
21	(Ukraine) Maryna Zanevska	7^{7}	6

Qualifying competition
(Germany) Carina Witthöft	6^{4}	3
21	(Ukraine) Maryna Zanevska	7^{7}	6

=== Third qualifier ===
First round
3	(Germany) Anna-Lena Friedsam	6	6
PR	(Netherlands) Bibiane Weijers	0	3
(Russia) Marta Sirotkina	4	1
(Czech Republic) Renata Voráčová	6	6
WC	(United States) Katerina Stewart	6	6
(Ukraine) Yuliya Beygelzimer	3	1
(Russia) Marina Melnikova	5	6^{3}
19	(Ukraine) Lesia Tsurenko	7	7^{7}

Second round
3	(Germany) Anna-Lena Friedsam	6	4	6
(Czech Republic) Renata Voráčová	3	6	3
WC	(United States) Katerina Stewart	1	0
19	(Ukraine) Lesia Tsurenko	6	6

Qualifying competition
3	(Germany) Anna-Lena Friedsam	4	6	2
19	(Ukraine) Lesia Tsurenko	6	4	6

=== Fourth qualifier ===
First round
4	(Portugal) Michelle Larcher de Brito	7	6^{6}	6
(Canada) Gabriela Dabrowski	5	7^{8}	2
(Czech Republic) Barbora Krejčíková	6	1	6
(Japan) Eri Hozumi	2	6	3
WC	(United States) Tornado Alicia Black	7^{8}	7^{7}
(United Kingdom) Naomi Broady	6^{6}	6^{2}
(Switzerland) Viktorija Golubic	1	1
27	(Russia) Alla Kudryavtseva	6	6

Second round
4	(Portugal) Michelle Larcher de Brito	6^{4}	3
(Czech Republic) Barbora Krejčíková	7^{7}	6
WC	(United States) Tornado Alicia Black	4	3
27	(Russia) Alla Kudryavtseva	6	6

Qualifying competition
(Czech Republic) Barbora Krejčíková	6^{1}	3
27	(Russia) Alla Kudryavtseva	7^{7}	6

=== Fifth qualifier ===
First round
5	(Montenegro) Danka Kovinić	6	4	4
WC	(United States) Caitlin Whoriskey	2	6	6
(Australia) Ashleigh Barty	6	1
(Thailand) Noppawan Lertcheewakarn	1	0^{r}
(Russia) Elizaveta Kulichkova	6^{3}	0
(France) Stéphanie Foretz	7^{7}	6
(Kazakhstan) Sesil Karatantcheva	4	1
26	(United States) Melanie Oudin	6	6

Second round
WC	(United States) Caitlin Whoriskey	4	0
(Australia) Ashleigh Barty	6	6
(France) Stéphanie Foretz	2	5
26	(United States) Melanie Oudin	6	7

Qualifying competition
(Australia) Ashleigh Barty	7^{9}	6
26	(United States) Melanie Oudin	6^{7}	3

=== Sixth qualifier ===
First round
6	(Australia) Olivia Rogowska	6	6
(Germany) Kristina Barrois	4	2
(Germany) Laura Siegemund	6	0	7^{9}
(Spain) Beatriz García Vidagany	3	6	6^{7}
(Belgium) An-Sophie Mestach	1	6^{5}
(Czech Republic) Andrea Hlaváčková	6	7^{7}
WC	(United States) Asia Muhammad	3	7^{7}	3
18	(Russia) Ksenia Pervak	6	6^{2}	6

Second round
6	(Australia) Olivia Rogowska	4	3
(Germany) Laura Siegemund	6	6
(Czech Republic) Andrea Hlaváčková	2	0
18	(Russia) Ksenia Pervak	6	6

Qualifying competition
(Germany) Laura Siegemund	1	3
18	(Russia) Ksenia Pervak	6	6

=== Seventh qualifier ===
First round
7	(United States) Anna Tatishvili	6	5	3
(Japan) Nao Hibino	4	7	6
(Canada) Françoise Abanda	6	6
(Romania) Andreea Mitu	1	1
(Japan) Misa Eguchi	6	6
(France) Alizé Lim	2	2
(Chinese Taipei) Hsieh Su-wei	2	6^{3}
30	(Turkey) Çağla Büyükakçay	6	7^{7}

Second round
(Japan) Nao Hibino	1	1
(Canada) Françoise Abanda	6	6
(Japan) Misa Eguchi	7	7
30	(Turkey) Çağla Büyükakçay	5	5

Qualifying competition
(Canada) Françoise Abanda	6	6
(Japan) Misa Eguchi	0	2

=== Eighth qualifier ===
First round
8	(Austria) Tamira Paszek	6	6
WC	(France) Fiona Ferro	2	4
(Netherlands) Cindy Burger	6	2	2
(France) Irena Pavlovic	3	6	6
(Netherlands) Lesley Kerkhove	6	6^{7}	6
(Latvia) Diāna Marcinkēviča	1	7^{9}	1
(China) Duan Yingying	7	6
24	(Sweden) Sofia Arvidsson	5	3

Second round
8	(Austria) Tamira Paszek	4	2
(France) Irena Pavlovic	6	6
(Netherlands) Lesley Kerkhove	5	3
(China) Duan Yingying	7	6

Qualifying competition
(France) Irena Pavlovic	3	6	6^{5}
(China) Duan Yingying	6	1	7^{7}

=== Ninth qualifier ===
First round
9	(France) Claire Feuerstein	3	4
(Tunisia) Ons Jabeur	6	6
(United States) Julia Boserup	7^{12}	3	3
PR	(Germany) Tatjana Maria	6^{10}	6	6
(Italy) Gioia Barbieri	6	0	6
(Ukraine) Nadiia Kichenok	4	6	2
(Netherlands) Arantxa Rus	3	1
25	(Paraguay) Verónica Cepede Royg	6	6

Second round
(Tunisia) Ons Jabeur	0	7	7^{7}
PR	(Germany) Tatjana Maria	6	5	6^{4}
(Italy) Gioia Barbieri	6	3	1
25	(Paraguay) Verónica Cepede Royg	3	6	6

Qualifying competition
(Tunisia) Ons Jabeur	7^{7}	4	6
25	(Paraguay) Verónica Cepede Royg	6^{3}	6	3

=== Tenth qualifier ===
First round
10	(Czech Republic) Kateřina Siniaková	6	0
(Norway) Ulrikke Eikeri	2	0^{r}
(Ukraine) Lyudmyla Kichenok	6	1	3
(Colombia) Mariana Duque Mariño	2	6	6
(Japan) Miharu Imanishi	3	7^{7}	4
(Czech Republic) Denisa Allertová	6	6^{3}	6
(Croatia) Petra Martić	4	3
32	(Serbia) Aleksandra Krunić	6	6

Second round
10	(Czech Republic) Kateřina Siniaková	6	3	6
(Colombia) Mariana Duque Mariño	3	6	3
(Czech Republic) Denisa Allertová	2	4
32	(Serbia) Aleksandra Krunić	6	6

Qualifying competition
10	(Czech Republic) Kateřina Siniaková	5	6	0
32	(Serbia) Aleksandra Krunić	7	0	6

=== Eleventh qualifier ===
First round
11	(Croatia) Ana Konjuh	1	6	4
(Poland) Urszula Radwańska	6	4	6
(Netherlands) Richèl Hogenkamp	6	6^{4}	6
(Poland) Magda Linette	2	7^{7}	3
(Australia) Anastasia Rodionova	6	3	6
(Netherlands) Indy de Vroome	2	6	0
PR	(Uzbekistan) Akgul Amanmuradova	4	4
22	(Germany) Dinah Pfizenmaier	6	6

Second round
(Poland) Urszula Radwańska	6	4	2
(Netherlands) Richèl Hogenkamp	4	6	6
(Australia) Anastasia Rodionova	6	3	6
22	(Germany) Dinah Pfizenmaier	4	6	2

Qualifying competition
(Netherlands) Richèl Hogenkamp	4	3
(Australia) Anastasia Rodionova	6	6

=== Twelfth qualifier ===
First round
12	(Luxembourg) Mandy Minella	6	3	1
(Ukraine) Kateryna Kozlova	4	6	6
(Canada) Heidi El Tabakh	7^{7}	6^{5}	6
WC	(United States) Samantha Crawford	6^{1}	7^{7}	2
PR	(Australia) Daria Gavrilova	2	6	6
(Slovenia) Tadeja Majerič	6	2	2
(Chinese Taipei) Chan Yung-jan	6	6
17	(Spain) Lourdes Domínguez Lino	1	0

Second round
(Ukraine) Kateryna Kozlova	6	7^{7}
(Canada) Heidi El Tabakh	3	6^{2}
PR	(Australia) Daria Gavrilova	3	1
(Chinese Taipei) Chan Yung-jan	6	6

Qualifying competition
(Ukraine) Kateryna Kozlova	6	3	3
(Chinese Taipei) Chan Yung-jan	2	6	6

=== Thirteenth qualifier ===
First round
13	(Croatia) Mirjana Lučić-Baroni	6	5	6
WC	(United States) Bernarda Pera	4	7	4
(Czech Republic) Lucie Hradecká	6^{5}	6^{4}
(United States) Irina Falconi	7^{7}	7^{7}
(Bulgaria) Elitsa Kostova	7^{7}	4	3
(Italy) Alberta Brianti	6^{0}	6	6
(Georgia (country)) Sofia Shapatava	6	6
23	(Slovakia) Kristína Kučová	3	3

Second round
13	(Croatia) Mirjana Lučić-Baroni	6	6
(United States) Irina Falconi	3	3
(Italy) Alberta Brianti	6	1	3
(Georgia (country)) Sofia Shapatava	1	6	6

Qualifying competition
13	(Croatia) Mirjana Lučić-Baroni	6	4	7
(Georgia (country)) Sofia Shapatava	4	6	5

=== Fourteenth qualifier ===
First round
14	(Russia) Alexandra Panova	7^{7}	2	6
(Russia) Margarita Gasparyan	6^{3}	6	2
(United States) Louisa Chirico	6	6
(Argentina) María Irigoyen	2	2
(South Korea) Jang Su-jeong	1	3
(Uzbekistan) Nigina Abduraimova	6	6
(Poland) Paula Kania	3
28	(United States) Allie Kiick	0^{r}

Second round
14	(Russia) Alexandra Panova	6	6
(United States) Louisa Chirico	4	3
(Uzbekistan) Nigina Abduraimova	6^{4}	4
(Poland) Paula Kania	7^{7}	6

Qualifying competition
14	(Russia) Alexandra Panova	6	3	2
(Poland) Paula Kania	1	6	6

=== Fifteenth qualifier ===
First round
15	(Serbia) Jovana Jakšić	6^{5}	6	6
(Croatia) Ana Vrljić	7^{7}	1	1
(China) Zheng Saisai	6	2	6
(Ukraine) Olga Savchuk	4	6	3
(China) Zhu Lin	6^{6}	7	6
(Italy) Giulia Gatto-Monticone	7^{8}	5	1
(Australia) Arina Rodionova	7	4	6
31	(United States) Sachia Vickery	5	6	4

Second round
15	(Serbia) Jovana Jakšić	4	2
(China) Zheng Saisai	6	6
(China) Zhu Lin	6	6
(Australia) Arina Rodionova	4	2

Qualifying competition
(China) Zheng Saisai	6	6
(China) Zhu Lin	3	1

=== Sixteenth qualifier ===
First round
16	(Belarus) Aliaksandra Sasnovich	6	6
(Italy) Anastasia Grymalska	0	2
(Argentina) Florencia Molinero	2	3
(Russia) Ekaterina Bychkova	6	6
WC	(United States) Maria Sanchez	4	6	6
(Japan) Erika Sema	6	4	3
(Paraguay) Montserrat González	0	6	2
20	(Kazakhstan) Yulia Putintseva	6	4	6

Second round
16	(Belarus) Aliaksandra Sasnovich	6	6
(Russia) Ekaterina Bychkova	4	4
WC	(United States) Maria Sanchez	6	6
20	(Kazakhstan) Yulia Putintseva	2	4

Qualifying competition
16	(Belarus) Aliaksandra Sasnovich	6	6
WC	(United States) Maria Sanchez	3	2
