= 2014 US Open – Girls' singles =

Girls' singles
- 2014 US Open

Final
- Champion: (Czech Republic) Marie Bouzková
- Runner-up: (Ukraine) Anhelina Kalinina
- Score: 6–4, 7–6^{(7–5)}

Events
Singles	men	women		boys	girls
Doubles	men	women	mixed	boys	girls
WC Singles	men	women	quad
WC Doubles	men	women	quad
Legends	men	women	mixed
- US Open

Ana Konjuh was the defending champion, having won the event in 2013, however she participated in the qualifying round and lost to Urszula Radwańska in the first round.

Marie Bouzková won the title, defeating Anhelina Kalinina in the final, 6–4, 7–6^{(7–5)}.

== Seeds ==
1. (United States) CiCi Bellis (second round)
2. (Latvia) Jeļena Ostapenko (second round)
3. (Belarus) Iryna Shymanovich (quarterfinals)
4. (United States) Tornado Alicia Black (quarterfinals)
5. (Slovakia) Kristína Schmiedlová (first round)
6. (Switzerland) Jil Teichmann (third round)
7. (Spain) Aliona Bolsova Zadoinov (third round)
8. (Spain) Paula Badosa (first round)
9. (Ukraine) Anhelina Kalinina (final)
10. (Czech Republic) Markéta Vondroušová (first round)
11. (Russia) Anna Kalinskaya (quarterfinals)
12. (Russia) Anastasiya Komardina (second round)
13. (Australia) Naiktha Bains (second round)
14. (Turkey) İpek Soylu (first round)
15. (Romania) Ioana Loredana Roșca (first round)
16. (Ukraine) Olga Fridman (third round)

== Main draw ==
Key

- Q = Qualifier
- WC = Wild card
- LL = Lucky loser
- Alt = Alternate
- ITF = ITF entry
- PR = Protected ranking
- SR = Special ranking
- SE = Special exempt
- JE = Junior exempt
- JR = Junior Accelerator Programme entrant
- CO = College Accelerator Programme entrant
- NG = Next Gen Accelerator Program entrant
- w/o = Walkover
- r = Retired
- d = Defaulted

=== Finals ===
Quarterfinals
(Belgium) Greet Minnen	2	0
WC	(United States) Katerina Stewart	6	6
3	(Belarus) Iryna Shymanovich	4	3
9	(Ukraine) Anhelina Kalinina	6	6
Q	(United States) Caroline Dolehide	6	7
4	(United States) Tornado Alicia Black	3	5
11	(Russia) Anna Kalinskaya	2	2
(Czech Republic) Marie Bouzková	6	6

Semifinals
WC	(United States) Katerina Stewart	6	2	1
9	(Ukraine) Anhelina Kalinina	4	6	6
Q	(United States) Caroline Dolehide	3	1
(Czech Republic) Marie Bouzková	6	6

Final
9	(Ukraine) Anhelina Kalinina	4	6^{5}
(Czech Republic) Marie Bouzková	6	7^{7}

=== Top half ===
==== Section 1 ====
First round
1	(United States) CiCi Bellis	6	6
(Mexico) Renata Zarazúa	1	3
(Russia) Natalia Vikhlyantseva	6	6
(Egypt) Sandra Samir	4	3
(United States) Katrine Steffensen	4	2
(Belgium) Greet Minnen	6	6
WC	(United States) Ingrid Neel	7^{12}	6^{1}	1
13	(Australia) Naiktha Bains	6^{10}	7^{7}	6
12	(Russia) Anastasiya Komardina	6	3
(Romania) Elena Gabriela Ruse	0	1^{r}
WC	(United States) Katerina Stewart	7^{7}	7^{7}
(United Kingdom) Katie Boulter	6^{5}	6^{2}
(United States) Michaela Gordon	6	6
(Czech Republic) Miriam Kolodziejová	1	2
(Hungary) Anna Bondár	6	3	6
5	(Slovakia) Kristína Schmiedlová	3	6	3

Second round
1	(United States) CC Bellis	6^{9}	6	1
(Russia) N Vikhlyantseva	7^{11}	2	6
(Belgium) G Minnen	6	6
13	(Australia) N Bains	2	2
12	(Russia) A Komardina	1	1
WC	(United States) K Stewart	6	6
(United States) M Gordon	3	6	5
(Hungary) A Bondár	6	3	7

Third round
(Russia) N Vikhlyantseva	3	2
(Belgium) G Minnen	6	6
WC	(United States) K Stewart	6	6
(Hungary) A Bondár	4	2

Quarterfinals
(Belgium) G Minnen	2	0
WC	(United States) K Stewart	6	6

==== Section 2 ====
First round
3	(Belarus) Iryna Shymanovich	6	4	6
(Brazil) Luisa Stefani	1	6	2
WC	(United States) Francesca Di Lorenzo	6	6
Q	(United Kingdom) Maia Lumsden	4	0
(United States) Sofia Kenin	3	2
(Indonesia) Tami Grende	6	6
Q	(Canada) Katherine Sebov	6	1	6
15	(Romania) Ioana Loredana Roșca	4	6	3
9	(Ukraine) Anhelina Kalinina	6	6
Q	(France) Margot Yerolymos	4	2
SE	(United Kingdom) Katie Swan	7^{7}	6
WC	(United States) Claire Liu	6^{5}	2
WC	(United States) Brooke Austin	0	6	0
(Russia) Evgeniya Levashova	6	2	6
(Czech Republic) Simona Heinová	2	4
7	(Spain) Aliona Bolsova Zadoinov	6	6

Second round
3	(Belarus) I Shymanovich	4	6	6
WC	(United States) F Di Lorenzo	6	1	2
(Indonesia) T Grende	6^{5}	6	4
Q	(Canada) K Sebov	7^{7}	3	6
9	(Ukraine) A Kalinina	6	6
SE	(United Kingdom) K Swan	3	2
(Russia) E Levashova	5	0
7	(Spain) A Bolsova Zadoinov	7	6

Third round
3	(Belarus) I Shymanovich	6	6
Q	(Canada) K Sebov	3	4
9	(Ukraine) A Kalinina	6	7
7	(Spain) A Bolsova Zadoinov	3	5

Quarterfinals
3	(Belarus) I Shymanovich	4	3
9	(Ukraine) A Kalinina	6	6

=== Bottom half ===
==== Section 3 ====
First round
6	(Switzerland) Jil Teichmann	6	7^{7}
(United Kingdom) Isabelle Wallace	3	6^{4}
(Hungary) Dalma Gálfi	6	4	7
(United States) Jessica Ho	4	6	5
LL	(United States) Madison Bourguignon	4	3
Q	(Argentina) Nadia Podoroska	6	6
Q	(United States) Caroline Dolehide	6^{4}	6	6
10	(Czech Republic) Markéta Vondroušová	7^{7}	3	4
14	(Turkey) İpek Soylu	6^{4}	3
Q	(Belarus) Vera Lapko	7^{7}	6
(Russia) Anna Blinkova	6	6
(United States) Dasha Ivanova	4	4
Q	(United Kingdom) Freya Christie	4	2
(Slovakia) Viktória Kužmová	6	6
(Australia) Kimberly Birrell	5	0
4	(United States) Tornado Alicia Black	7	6

Second round
6	(Switzerland) J Teichmann	7^{7}	6
(Hungary) D Gálfi	6^{3}	3
Q	(Argentina) N Podoroska	3	2
Q	(United States) C Dolehide	6	6
Q	(Belarus) V Lapko	7^{7}	6
(Russia) A Blinkova	6^{5}	2
(Slovakia) V Kužmová	4	6	2
4	(United States) TA Black	6	4	6

Third round
6	(Switzerland) J Teichmann	5	1
Q	(United States) C Dolehide	7	6
Q	(Belarus) V Lapko	2	0
4	(United States) TA Black	6	6

Quarterfinals
Q	(United States) C Dolehide	6	7
4	(United States) TA Black	3	5

==== Section 4 ====
First round
8	(Spain) Paula Badosa	4	6	1
(Slovakia) Tereza Mihalíková	6	3	6
(United States) Raveena Kingsley	6	6
(Romania) Jaqueline Adina Cristian	3	3
WC	(United States) Kelly Chen	6	6^{6}	6
(Slovenia) Tamara Zidanšek	0	7^{8}	0
(Italy) Bianca Turati	2	4
11	(Russia) Anna Kalinskaya	6	6
16	(Ukraine) Olga Fridman	6	6
WC	(United States) Kylie McKenzie	1	2
(United States) Usue Maitane Arconada	6	6
(United Kingdom) Gabriella Taylor	1	1
WC	(United States) Ena Shibahara	0	2
(Czech Republic) Marie Bouzková	6	6
LL	(South Africa) Theresa van Zyl	1	2
2	(Latvia) Jeļena Ostapenko	6	6

Second round
(Slovakia) T Mihalíková	4	5
(United States) R Kingsley	6	7
WC	(United States) K Chen	3	1
11	(Russia) A Kalinskaya	6	6
16	(Ukraine) O Fridman	5	6	6
(United States) UM Arconada	7	1	4
(Czech Republic) M Bouzková	6	6
2	(Latvia) J Ostapenko	3	1

Third round
(United States) R Kingsley	4	2
11	(Russia) A Kalinskaya	6	6
16	(Ukraine) O Fridman	5	6^{6}
(Czech Republic) M Bouzková	7	7^{8}

Quarterfinals
11	(Russia) A Kalinskaya	2	2
(Czech Republic) M Bouzková	6	6
