= 2014 US Open – Men's singles =

Tennis tournament held in 2014

Men's singles
- 2014 US Open

Final
- Champion: (Croatia) Marin Čilić
- Runner-up: (Japan) Kei Nishikori
- Score: 6–3, 6–3, 6–3

Details
- Draw: 128
- Seeds: 32

Events
Singles	men	women		boys	girls
Doubles	men	women	mixed	boys	girls
WC Singles	men	women	quad
WC Doubles	men	women	quad
Legends	men	women	mixed
- US Open

Marin Čilić defeated Kei Nishikori in the final, 6–3, 6–3, 6–3 to win the men's singles tennis title at the 2014 US Open. It was his first major title. Čilić was the second Croatian to win a men's singles major, after his coach Goran Ivanišević at the 2001 Wimbledon Championships.

Rafael Nadal was the reigning champion, but withdrew before the tournament due to a right wrist injury.

Nishikori became the first Japanese in the Open Era to reach a major semifinal and final, and the first since Jiro Sato at the 1933 French Championships.

The finalists defeated Roger Federer and Novak Djokovic in their respective semifinals, guaranteeing a new major champion. This was the first major final with a guaranteed first-time champion since the 2008 Australian Open and the first major final with two first-time finalists since the 2005 French Open. Nishikori and Čilić were the two lowest-ranked seeds to reach the US Open final since 2002. Between the 2005 Australian Open and 2020 US Open, this was the only major final not to feature a member of the Big Four.

This marked the first US Open appearance of future champion Dominic Thiem; he lost in the fourth round to Tomáš Berdych.

== Seeds ==
1. (Serbia) Novak Djokovic (semifinals)
2. (Switzerland) Roger Federer (semifinals)
3. (Switzerland) Stan Wawrinka (quarterfinals)
4. (Spain) David Ferrer (third round)
5. (Canada) Milos Raonic (fourth round)
6. (Czech Republic) Tomáš Berdych (quarterfinals)
7. (Bulgaria) Grigor Dimitrov (fourth round)
8. (United Kingdom) Andy Murray (quarterfinals)
9. (France) Jo-Wilfried Tsonga (fourth round)
10. (Japan) Kei Nishikori (final)
11. (Latvia) Ernests Gulbis (second round)
12. (France) Richard Gasquet (third round)
13. (United States) John Isner (third round)
14. (Croatia) Marin Čilić (champion)
15. (Italy) Fabio Fognini (second round)
16. (Spain) Tommy Robredo (fourth round)

17. (Spain) Roberto Bautista Agut (fourth round)
18. (South Africa) Kevin Anderson (third round)
19. (Spain) Feliciano López (third round)
20. (France) Gaël Monfils (quarterfinals)
21. (Russia) Mikhail Youzhny (first round)
22. (Germany) Philipp Kohlschreiber (fourth round)
23. (Argentina) Leonardo Mayer (third round)
24. (France) Julien Benneteau (first round)
25. (Croatia) Ivo Karlović (second round)
26. (France) Gilles Simon (fourth round)
27. (Colombia) Santiago Giraldo (first round)
28. (Spain) Guillermo García-López (second round)
29. (Czech Republic) Lukáš Rosol (first round)
30. (France) Jérémy Chardy (second round)
31. (Spain) Fernando Verdasco (second round)
32. (Portugal) João Sousa (second round)

Click on the seed number of a player to go to their draw section.

== Draw ==
Key

- Q = Qualifier
- WC = Wild card
- LL = Lucky loser
- Alt = Alternate
- ITF = ITF entry
- PR = Protected ranking
- SR = Special ranking
- SE = Special exempt
- JE = Junior exempt
- JR = Junior Accelerator Programme entrant
- CO = College Accelerator Programme entrant
- NG = Next Gen Accelerator Program entrant
- w/o = Walkover
- r = Retired
- d = Defaulted

=== Finals ===
Quarterfinals
1	(Serbia) Novak Djokovic	7^{7}	6^{1}	6	6
8	(United Kingdom) Andy Murray	6^{1}	7^{7}	2	4
3	(Switzerland) Stan Wawrinka	6	5	6^{7}	7^{7}	4
10	(Japan) Kei Nishikori	3	7	7^{9}	6^{5}	6
6	(Czech Republic) Tomáš Berdych	2	4	6^{4}
14	(Croatia) Marin Čilić	6	6	7^{7}
20	(France) Gaël Monfils	6	6	4	5	2
2	(Switzerland) Roger Federer	4	3	6	7	6

Semifinals
1	(Serbia) Novak Djokovic	4	6	6^{4}	3
10	(Japan) Kei Nishikori	6	1	7^{7}	6
14	(Croatia) Marin Čilić	6	6	6
2	(Switzerland) Roger Federer	3	4	4

Final
10	(Japan) Kei Nishikori	3	3	3
14	(Croatia) Marin Čilić	6	6	6

=== Top half ===
==== Section 1 ====
First round
1	(Serbia) N Djokovic	6	6	6
(Argentina) D Schwartzman	1	2	4
(Luxembourg) G Müller	7^{9}	5	6^{6}	7^{7}	1
(France) P-H Mathieu	6^{7}	7	7^{8}	6^{5}	6
(Argentina) M González	2	6	4	6	3
(United States) S Querrey	6	4	6	4	6
(Chinese Taipei) Y-h Lu	4	2	2
28	(Spain) G García-López	6	6	6
22	(Germany) P Kohlschreiber	6	7^{7}	6
Q	(Argentina) F Bagnis	2	6^{3}	3
WC	(France) M Llodra	6	6	7
(Spain) D Gimeno Traver	4	3	5
(Kazakhstan) M Kukushkin	6	6	3	3	5
(Germany) J-L Struff	2	3	6	6	7
WC	(United States) M Giron	6^{5}	2	6^{2}
13	(United States) J Isner	7^{7}	6	7^{7}

Second round
1	(Serbia) N Djokovic	6	6	6
(France) P-H Mathieu	1	3	0
(United States) S Querrey	6	6	6
28	(Spain) G García-López	3	4	4
22	(Germany) P Kohlschreiber	6	0
WC	(France) M Llodra	2	0^{r}
(Germany) J-L Struff	6^{5}	4	2
13	(United States) J Isner	7^{7}	6	6

Third round
1	(Serbia) N Djokovic	6	6	6
(United States) S Querrey	3	2	2
22	(Germany) P Kohlschreiber	7^{7}	4	7^{7}	7^{7}
13	(United States) J Isner	6^{4}	6	6^{2}	6^{4}

Fourth round
1	(Serbia) N Djokovic	6	7	6
22	(Germany) P Kohlschreiber	1	5	4

==== Section 2 ====
First round
9	(France) J-W Tsonga	6	4	7^{7}	6
(Argentina) J Mónaco	3	6	6^{2}	1
Q	(Republic of Ireland) J McGee	6	2	1	6^{3}
(Kazakhstan) A Nedovyesov	4	6	6	7^{7}
(Spain) P Carreño Busta	6	4	6	7^{7}
Q	(Germany) A Beck	3	6	2	6^{0}
(France) B Paire	7^{7}	5	6	4	6
24	(France) J Benneteau	6^{4}	7	4	6	4
31	(Spain) F Verdasco	6	3	7	1	6
(Slovenia) B Rola	3	6	5	6	4
(United States) B Klahn	4	6	3	5
(Russia) A Kuznetsov	6	4	6	7
Q	(Germany) M Bachinger	6	6	6
(Czech Republic) R Štěpánek	3	2	2
(Netherlands) R Haase	3	6^{6}	6	5
8	(United Kingdom) A Murray	6	7^{8}	1	7

Second round
9	(France) J-W Tsonga	6	6	6
(Kazakhstan) A Nedovyesov	3	4	4
(Spain) P Carreño Busta	6	6	3	6
(France) B Paire	1	4	6	3
31	(Spain) F Verdasco	3	6	6	5	3
(Russia) A Kuznetsov	6	4	4	7	6
Q	(Germany) M Bachinger	3	3	4
8	(United Kingdom) A Murray	6	6	6

Third round
9	(France) J-W Tsonga	6	6	6
(Spain) P Carreño Busta	4	4	4
(Russia) A Kuznetsov	1	5	6	2
8	(United Kingdom) A Murray	6	7	4	6

Fourth round
9	(France) J-W Tsonga	5	5	4
8	(United Kingdom) A Murray	7	7	6

==== Section 3 ====
First round
3	(Switzerland) S Wawrinka	6	7^{8}	7^{7}
(Czech Republic) J Veselý	2	6^{6}	6^{3}
(Brazil) T Bellucci	7^{7}	6	6
(France) N Mahut	6^{4}	4	1
(Slovenia) B Kavčič	7	6	6
(United States) D Young	5	4	4
(Colombia) A Falla	7^{7}	2	5	4
30	(France) J Chardy	6^{5}	6	7	6
21	(Russia) M Youzhny	5	6^{4}	6	6^{1}
(Australia) N Kyrgios	7	7^{7}	2	7^{7}
(Ukraine) S Stakhovsky	3	1	4
(Italy) A Seppi	6	6	6
(Italy) S Bolelli	2	6	6	3	6
(Canada) V Pospisil	6	4	2	6	3
(France) É Roger-Vasselin	4	3	4
16	(Spain) T Robredo	6	6	6

Second round
3	(Switzerland) S Wawrinka	6	6	3	7^{7}
(Brazil) T Bellucci	3	4	6	6^{1}
(Slovenia) B Kavčič	6	7^{8}	6
30	(France) J Chardy	2	6^{6}	3
(Australia) N Kyrgios	6	7^{7}	6
(Italy) A Seppi	4	6^{2}	4
(Italy) S Bolelli	7	7^{7}	4	3	2
16	(Spain) T Robredo	5	6^{5}	6	6	6

Third round
3	(Switzerland) S Wawrinka	w/o
(Slovenia) B Kavčič
(Australia) N Kyrgios	6	3	6^{4}	3
16	(Spain) T Robredo	3	6	7^{7}	6

Fourth round
3	(Switzerland) S Wawrinka	7	4	7^{9}	6
16	(Spain) T Robredo	5	6	6^{7}	2

==== Section 4 ====
First round
10	(Japan) K Nishikori	6	6	6
WC	(United States) W Odesnik	2	4	2
(Spain) P Andújar	6	3	6	0
(United States) J Sock	4	6	1	0^{r}
(Australia) M Ebden	6	6	7^{7}
(Germany) T Kamke	4	3	6^{2}
(Spain) A Montañés	2	0^{r}
23	(Argentina) L Mayer	6	3
29	(Czech Republic) L Rosol	4	1	2
Q	(Croatia) B Ćorić	6	6	6
(Dominican Republic) V Estrella Burgos	2	6	6	6
(Netherlands) I Sijsling	6	4	3	2
Q	(Germany) P Gojowczyk	6	6	6
(Germany) B Becker	2	4	2
Q	(Japan) T Daniel	3	2	6^{1}
5	(Canada) M Raonic	6	6	7^{7}

Second round
10	(Japan) K Nishikori	6	6	0
(Spain) P Andújar	4	1	0^{r}
(Australia) M Ebden	1	3	4
23	(Argentina) L Mayer	6	6	6
Q	(Croatia) B Ćorić	6^{2}	6	4	2
(Dominican Republic) V Estrella Burgos	7^{7}	4	6	6
Q	(Germany) P Gojowczyk	6^{4}	7	4	6^{3}
5	(Canada) M Raonic	7^{7}	5	6	7^{7}

Third round
10	(Japan) K Nishikori	6	6	6
23	(Argentina) L Mayer	4	2	3
(Dominican Republic) V Estrella Burgos	6^{5}	6^{5}	6^{3}
5	(Canada) M Raonic	7^{7}	7^{7}	7^{7}

Fourth round
10	(Japan) K Nishikori	4	7^{7}	6^{6}	7	6
5	(Canada) M Raonic	6	6^{4}	7^{8}	5	4

=== Bottom half ===
==== Section 5 ====
First round
6	(Czech Republic) T Berdych	6	6	6
(Australia) L Hewitt	3	4	3
Q	(Belgium) S Darcis	6	6	6^{5}	5	4
(Slovakia) M Kližan	3	2	7^{7}	7	6
(Russia) E Donskoy	6	6^{6}	6	3	4
Q	(Russia) A Kudryavtsev	2	7^{8}	3	6	6
(Russia) T Gabashvili	6	1	7^{8}	6
27	(Colombia) S Giraldo	3	6	6^{6}	3
19	(Spain) F López	1	7	2	6	1
(Croatia) I Dodig	6	5	6	4	1^{r}
(United States) S Johnson	2	6	7	1^{r}
Q	(Japan) T Ito	6	3	5	4
(Slovakia) L Lacko	3	3	2
(Austria) D Thiem	6	6	6
(France) K de Schepper	1	4	2
11	(Latvia) E Gulbis	6	6	6

Second round
6	(Czech Republic) T Berdych	6	4	6	3	6
(Slovakia) M Kližan	3	6	2	6	3
Q	(Russia) A Kudryavtsev	1	4	6^{4}
(Russia) T Gabashvili	6	6	7^{7}
19	(Spain) F López	6	3	6	7^{7}
Q	(Japan) T Ito	4	6	4	6^{4}
(Austria) D Thiem	4	3	6	6	6
11	(Latvia) E Gulbis	6	6	4	3	3

Third round
6	(Czech Republic) T Berdych	6	6	6
(Russia) T Gabashvili	3	2	4
19	(Spain) F López	4	2	3
(Austria) D Thiem	6	6	6

Fourth round
6	(Czech Republic) T Berdych	6	6	6
(Austria) D Thiem	1	2	4

==== Section 6 ====
First round
14	(Croatia) M Čilić	6	3
(Cyprus) M Baghdatis	3	1^{r}
Q	(Ukraine) I Marchenko	7^{7}	4	7^{15}	7^{7}
Q	(Switzerland) M Chiudinelli	6^{3}	6	6^{13}	6^{4}
(Poland) J Janowicz	6	7	5	7
(Serbia) D Lajović	3	5	7	5
(Uruguay) P Cuevas	3	7^{7}	6	2	6^{1}
18	(South Africa) K Anderson	6	6^{3}	4	6	7^{7}
26	(France) G Simon	6	6	6
Q	(Moldova) R Albot	3	4	2
WC	(United States) N Rubin	4	3	0
(Argentina) F Delbonis	6	6	6
WC	(Australia) B Tomic	7^{7}	6	7^{7}
(Germany) D Brown	6^{2}	4	6^{3}
(Bosnia and Herzegovina) D Džumhur	1	2	6	2
4	(Spain) D Ferrer	6	6	2	6

Second round
14	(Croatia) M Čilić	7^{7}	6	6
Q	(Ukraine) I Marchenko	6^{2}	2	4
(Poland) J Janowicz	7^{8}	2	1	3
18	(South Africa) K Anderson	6^{6}	6	6	6
26	(France) G Simon	6	3	7	6
(Argentina) F Delbonis	4	6	5	1
WC	(Australia) B Tomic
4	(Spain) D Ferrer	w/o

Third round
14	(Croatia) M Čilić	6	3	6	6
18	(South Africa) K Anderson	3	6	3	4
26	(France) G Simon	6	3	6	6
4	(Spain) D Ferrer	3	6	1	3

Fourth round
14	(Croatia) M Čilić	5	7^{7}	6	3	6
26	(France) G Simon	7	6^{3}	4	6	3

==== Section 7 ====
First round
7	(Bulgaria) G Dimitrov	6	7^{7}	6
WC	(United States) R Harrison	2	6^{4}	2
(Argentina) C Berlocq	6	3	2	5
(Israel) D Sela	1	6	6	7
Q	(Belgium) N Desein	1	3	3
(Belgium) D Goffin	6	6	6
(Canada) F Dancevic	6^{6}	6	2	6	6^{2}
32	(Portugal) J Sousa	7^{8}	3	6	4	7^{7}
20	(France) G Monfils	6	6	6
WC	(United States) J Donaldson	4	2	4
(Colombia) A González	6	6	7
(Russia) D Tursunov	4	4	5
Q	(Japan) Y Nishioka	1	2	1^{r}
(Italy) P Lorenzi	6	6	2
(Uzbekistan) D Istomin	5	6^{5}	4
12	(France) R Gasquet	7	7^{7}	6

Second round
7	(Bulgaria) G Dimitrov	6	6	6
(Israel) D Sela	1	2	2
(Belgium) D Goffin	6	6	6
32	(Portugal) J Sousa	4	2	0
20	(France) G Monfils	7	6	6
(Colombia) A González	5	3	2
(Italy) P Lorenzi	6^{4}	3	3
12	(France) R Gasquet	7^{7}	6	6

Third round
7	(Bulgaria) G Dimitrov	0	6	6	6
(Belgium) D Goffin	6	3	4	1
20	(France) G Monfils	6	6	6
12	(France) R Gasquet	4	2	2

Fourth round
7	(Bulgaria) G Dimitrov	5	6^{6}	5
20	(France) G Monfils	7	7^{8}	7

==== Section 8 ====
First round
15	(Italy) F Fognini	6	6	6
(Kazakhstan) A Golubev	4	4	2
(Spain) P Riba	6	5	3	2
(France) A Mannarino	3	7	6	6
Q	(Serbia) F Krajinović	6	3	2	6^{5}
WC	(United States) T Smyczek	4	6	6	7^{7}
(Austria) A Haider-Maurer	7	6^{1}	6	5	1
17	(Spain) R Bautista Agut	5	7^{7}	1	7	6
25	(Croatia) I Karlović	6	6	3	6
(Finland) J Nieminen	4	4	6	4
(Austria) J Melzer	6^{1}	3	2
(Spain) M Granollers	7^{7}	6	6
(Spain) A Ramos-Viñolas	3	6^{5}	3
(Australia) S Groth	6	7^{7}	6
(Australia) M Matosevic	3	4	6^{4}
2	(Switzerland) R Federer	6	6	7^{7}

Second round
15	(Italy) F Fognini	3	4	1
(France) A Mannarino	6	6	6
WC	(United States) T Smyczek	3	2	1
17	(Spain) R Bautista Agut	6	6	6
25	(Croatia) I Karlović	6^{6}	7^{7}	6^{5}	6	4
(Spain) M Granollers	7^{8}	6^{3}	7^{7}	3	6
(Australia) S Groth	4	4	4
2	(Switzerland) R Federer	6	6	6

Third round
(France) A Mannarino	5	2	3
17	(Spain) R Bautista Agut	7	6	6
(Spain) M Granollers	6	1	1	1
2	(Switzerland) R Federer	4	6	6	6

Fourth round
17	(Spain) R Bautista Agut	4	3	2
2	(Switzerland) R Federer	6	6	6

Preceded by 2014 Wimbledon Championships – Men's singles	Grand Slam men's singles	Succeeded by 2015 Australian Open – Men's singles
