= 2014 US Open – Boys' singles =

Boys' singles
- 2014 US Open

Final
- Champion: (Australia) Omar Jasika
- Runner-up: (France) Quentin Halys
- Score: 2–6, 7–5, 6–1

Events
| Singles | men | women | | boys | girls |
| Doubles | men | women | mixed | boys | girls |
| WC Singles | men | women | quad |
| WC Doubles | men | women | quad |
| Legends | men | women | mixed |
- US Open

Borna Ćorić was the defending champion, having won the event in 2013, but qualified into the main draw at the men's singles and lost to Víctor Estrella Burgos in the second round.

Omar Jasika won the title, defeating Quentin Halys in the final, 2–6, 7–5, 6–1.

== Seeds ==
1. (Russia) Andrey Rublev (quarterfinals)
2. (Brazil) Orlando Luz (second round)
3. (United States) Jared Donaldson (third round)
4. (United States) Stefan Kozlov (quarterfinals, retired)
5. (France) Quentin Halys (final)
6. (United States) Francis Tiafoe (semifinals)
7. (South Korea) Lee Duck-hee (quarterfinals)
8. (Russia) Roman Safiullin (third round)
9. (Brazil) Marcelo Zormann (third round)
10. (United States) Michael Mmoh (first round)
11. (Japan) Jumpei Yamasaki (first round)
12. (Japan) Naoki Nakagawa (first round)
13. (Argentina) Matías Zukas (first round)
14. (United States) Taylor Harry Fritz (third round)
15. (Argentina) Francisco Bahamonde (first round)
16. (Peru) Nicolás Álvarez (first round)

== Main draw ==
Key

- Q = Qualifier
- WC = Wild card
- LL = Lucky loser
- Alt = Alternate
- ITF = ITF entry
- PR = Protected ranking
- SR = Special ranking
- SE = Special exempt
- JE = Junior exempt
- JR = Junior Accelerator Programme entrant
- CO = College Accelerator Programme entrant
- NG = Next Gen Accelerator Program entrant
- w/o = Walkover
- r = Retired
- d = Defaulted

=== Finals ===
Quarterfinals
1 | (Russia) Andrey Rublev | 1 | 7 | 4
6 | (United States) Frances Tiafoe | 6 | 5 | 6
4 | (United States) Stefan Kozlov | 1^{r}
5 | (France) Quentin Halys | 3
7 | (South Korea) Lee Duck-hee | 4 | 5
(Australia) Omar Jasika | 6 | 7
Q | (Sweden) Mikael Ymer | 2 | 6 | 3
(Germany) Jan Choinski | 6 | 3 | 6

Semifinals
6 | (United States) Frances Tiafoe | 2 | 6 | 6^{6}
5 | (France) Quentin Halys | 6 | 3 | 7^{8}
(Australia) Omar Jasika | 6 | 4
(Germany) Jan Choinski | 3 | 1^{r}

Final
5 | (France) Quentin Halys | 6 | 5 | 1
(Australia) Omar Jasika | 2 | 7 | 6

=== Top half ===
==== Section 1 ====
First round
1 | (Russia) Andrey Rublev | 6 | 6
(United States) Dennis Uspensky | 3 | 0
LL | (Argentina) Jordi Arconada | 7^{7} | 6
(Romania) Nicolae Frunză | 6^{4} | 1
(Italy) Filippo Baldi | 6^{6} | 7 | 6
Q | (Japan) Yusuke Takahashi | 7^{8} | 5 | 2
(Netherlands) Tim van Rijthoven | 3 | 7^{7} | 5
14 | (United States) Taylor Harry Fritz | 6 | 6^{5} | 7
9 | (Brazil) Marcelo Zormann | 6 | 6
(United States) Logan Smith | 3 | 1
SE | (Australia) Akira Santillan | 4 | 3
(Hungary) André Biró | 6 | 6
(Japan) Ryotaro Matsumura | 2 | 3
(Sweden) Daniel Appelgren | 6 | 6
(South Korea) Oh Chan-yeong | 2 | 3
6 | (United States) Frances Tiafoe | 6 | 6

Second round
1 | (Russia) A Rublev | 6 | 7^{7}
LL | (Argentina) J Arconada | 3 | 6^{3}
(Italy) F Baldi | 0 | 1
14 | (United States) TH Fritz | 6 | 6
9 | (Brazil) M Zormann | 4 | 6 | 6
(Hungary) A Biró | 6 | 4 | 2
(Sweden) D Appelgren | 6^{3} | 0^{r}
6 | (United States) F Tiafoe | 7^{7} | 0

Third round
1 | (Russia) A Rublev | 6 | 6
14 | (United States) TH Fritz | 4 | 0
9 | (Brazil) M Zormann | 4 | 7 | 3
6 | (United States) F Tiafoe | 6 | 5 | 6

Quarterfinals
1 | (Russia) A Rublev | 1 | 7 | 4
6 | (United States) F Tiafoe | 6 | 5 | 6

==== Section 2 ====
First round
4 | (United States) Stefan Kozlov | 6 | 6
(Poland) Jan Zieliński | 2 | 3
(Slovakia) Alex Molčan | 2 | 2
(Brazil) Rafael Matos | 6 | 6
(South Korea) Hong Seong-chan | 6 | 6
(Italy) Andrea Pellegrino | 1 | 1
WC | (United States) Reilly Opelka | 7^{7} | 2 | 6
15 | (Argentina) Francisco Bahamonde | 6^{3} | 6 | 3
12 | (Japan) Naoki Nakagawa | 2 | 6^{4}
(Russia) Alexander Bublik | 6 | 7^{7}
WC | (United States) Walker Duncan | 3 | 3
(Peru) Juan José Rosas | 6 | 6
(Croatia) Nino Serdarušić | 4 | 6 | 3
(United States) Alex Rybakov | 6 | 3 | 6
WC | (United States) Aron Hiltzik | 5 | 3
5 | (France) Quentin Halys | 7 | 6

Second round
4 | (United States) S Kozlov | 7^{7} | 6
(Brazil) R Matos | 6^{2} | 4
(South Korea) S-c Hong | 6 | 5 | 6
WC | (United States) R Opelka | 3 | 7 | 4
(Russia) A Bublik | 6 | 6
(Peru) JJ Rosas | 2 | 3
(United States) A Rybakov | 4 | 2
5 | (France) Q Halys | 6 | 6

Third round
4 | (United States) S Kozlov | 6 | 2 | 6
(South Korea) S-c Hong | 3 | 6 | 3
(Russia) A Bublik | 5 | 6^{0}
5 | (France) Q Halys | 7 | 7^{7}

Quarterfinals
4 | (United States) S Kozlov | 1^{r}
5 | (France) Q Halys | 3

=== Bottom half ===
==== Section 3 ====
First round
7 | (South Korea) Lee Duck-hee | 3 | 6 | 6
WC | (United States) Sameer Kumar | 6 | 3 | 2
(India) Sumit Nagal | 6 | 6
Q | (Norway) Viktor Durasovic | 3 | 4
(Brazil) João Menezes | 2 | 7^{7} | 3
(United States) Henrik Wiersholm | 6 | 6^{5} | 6
(Austria) Lucas Miedler | 7^{7} | 6
11 | (Japan) Jumpei Yamasaki | 6^{1} | 4
13 | (Argentina) Matías Zukas | 2 | 4
(Cyprus) Petros Chrysochos | 6 | 6
(Australia) Omar Jasika | 7^{7} | 7
WC | (United States) Deiton Baughman | 6^{4} | 5
(Russia) Boris Pokotilov | 1 | 5
Q | (Italy) Simone Roncalli | 6 | 7
(Peru) Pedro Iamachkine | 1 | 0
3 | (United States) Jared Donaldson | 6 | 6

Second round
7 | (South Korea) D-h Lee | 6 | 6
(India) S Nagal | 2 | 2
(United States) H Wiersholm | 7 | 6^{6} | 6
(Austria) L Miedler | 5 | 7^{8} | 2
(Cyprus) P Chrysochos | 3 | 7 | 3
(Australia) O Jasika | 6 | 5 | 6
Q | (Italy) S Roncalli | 3 | 1
3 | (United States) J Donaldson | 6 | 6

Third round
7 | (South Korea) D-h Lee | 6 | 6
(United States) H Wiersholm | 1 | 2
(Australia) O Jasika | 6 | 6
3 | (United States) J Donaldson | 4 | 3

Quarterfinals
7 | (South Korea) D-h Lee | 4 | 5
(Australia) O Jasika | 6 | 7

==== Section 4 ====
First round
8 | (Russia) Roman Safiullin | 6 | 6
WC | (United States) Tommy Paul | 4 | 3
(Australia) Marc Polmans | 7 | 6
(Japan) Sora Fukuda | 5 | 0
(Poland) Hubert Hurkacz | 2 | 2
Q | (Sweden) Mikael Ymer | 6 | 6
(South Korea) Chung Yun-seong | 4 | 6 | 7^{7}
10 | (United States) Michael Mmoh | 6 | 3 | 6^{5}
16 | (Peru) Nicolás Álvarez | 2 | 1
(Slovakia) Martin Blaško | 6 | 6
Q | (Italy) Matteo Berrettini | 7^{13} | 5 | 7^{7}
WC | (United States) Eduardo Nava | 6^{11} | 7 | 6^{3}
(Germany) Jan Choinski | 6 | 6
WC | (United States) John McNally | 1 | 2
Q | (Denmark) Simon Friis Søndergaard | 6^{4} | 6^{6}
2 | (Brazil) Orlando Luz | 7^{7} | 7^{8}

Second round
8 | (Russia) R Safiullin | 6 | 7
(Australia) M Polmans | 2 | 5
Q | (Sweden) M Ymer | 7 | 6
(South Korea) Y-s Chung | 5 | 2
(Slovakia) M Blaško | 6^{2} | 0
Q | (Italy) M Berrettini | 7^{7} | 6
(Germany) J Choinski | 6 | 6
2 | (Brazil) O Luz | 2 | 2

Third round
8 | (Russia) R Safiullin | 5 | 6 | 2
Q | (Sweden) M Ymer | 7 | 0 | 6
Q | (Italy) M Berrettini | 4 | 2
(Germany) J Choinski | 6 | 6

Quarterfinals
Q | (Sweden) M Ymer | 2 | 6 | 3
(Germany) J Choinski | 6 | 3 | 6
