= 2014 US Open – Boys' doubles =

Boys' doubles
- 2014 US Open

Final
- Champions: (Australia) Omar Jasika (Japan) Naoki Nakagawa
- Runners-up: (Brazil) Rafael Matos (Brazil) João Menezes
- Score: 6–3, 7–6^{(8–6)}

Events
| Singles | men | women | | boys | girls |
| Doubles | men | women | mixed | boys | girls |
| WC Singles | men | women | quad |
| WC Doubles | men | women | quad |
| Legends | men | women | mixed |
- US Open

Kamil Majchrzak and Martin Redlicki were the defending champions, having won the event in 2013. However, neither participated in the 2014 event; Redlicki's age by the 2014 event's qualifying cutoff made him ineligible to continue to participate in junior events and Majchrzak chose not to participate.

Omar Jasika and Naoki Nakagawa won the tournament after beating Rafael Matos and João Menezes in the final, 6–3, 7–6^{(8–6)}.

== Seeds ==
1. (United States) Stefan Kozlov / (Russia) Andrey Rublev (second round, withdrew)
2. (Brazil) Orlando Luz / (Brazil) Marcelo Zormann (quarterfinals)
3. (United States) Michael Mmoh / (United States) Francis Tiafoe (first round)
4. (Argentina) Francisco Bahamonde / (Argentina) Matías Zukas (second round)
5. (United States) Taylor Harry Fritz / (Netherlands) Tim van Rijthoven (quarterfinals)
6. (Australia) Omar Jasika / (Japan) Naoki Nakagawa (champions)
7. (Cyprus) Petros Chrysochos / (Croatia) Nino Serdarušić (second round)
8. (South Korea) Lee Duck-hee / (Australia) Marc Polmans (quarterfinals)

== Draw ==
Key

- Q = Qualifier
- WC = Wild card
- LL = Lucky loser
- Alt = Alternate
- ITF = ITF entry
- PR = Protected ranking
- SR = Special ranking
- SE = Special exempt
- JE = Junior exempt
- JR = Junior Accelerator Programme entrant
- CO = College Accelerator Programme entrant
- NG = Next Gen Accelerator Program entrant
- w/o = Walkover
- r = Retired
- d = Defaulted

=== Finals ===
Semifinals
(Norway) Viktor Durasovic (Romania) Nicolae Frunză | 4 | 3
(Brazil) Rafael Matos (Brazil) João Menezes | 6 | 6
(Italy) Filippo Baldi (Austria) Lucas Miedler | 6 | 1 | [11]
6 | (Australia) Omar Jasika (Japan) Naoki Nakagawa | 2 | 6 | [13]

Final
(Brazil) Rafael Matos (Brazil) João Menezes | 3 | 6^{6}
6 | (Australia) Omar Jasika (Japan) Naoki Nakagawa | 6 | 7^{8}

=== Top half ===
First round
1 | (United States) Stefan Kozlov (Russia) Andrey Rublev | 6 | 4 | [10]
(Japan) Ryotaro Matsumura (Japan) Jumpei Yamasaki | 2 | 6 | [6]
(Norway) Viktor Durasovic (Romania) Nicolae Frunză | 7^{8} | 4 | [10]
(Germany) Jan Choinski (Poland) Hubert Hurkacz | 6^{6} | 6 | [6]
WC | (United States) Sameer Kumar (United States) Eduardo Nava | 6 | 6
(Peru) Nicolás Álvarez (Peru) Juan José Rosas | 4 | 2
(France) Quentin Halys (Australia) Akira Santillan | 4 | 3
5 | (United States) Taylor Harry Fritz (Netherlands) Tim van Rijthoven | 6 | 6
3 | (United States) Michael Mmoh (United States) Francis Tiafoe | 5 | 6^{4}
(Brazil) Rafael Matos (Brazil) João Menezes | 7 | 7^{7}
(Slovakia) Martin Blaško (Slovakia) Alex Molčan | 6^{4} | 4
(Japan) Sora Fukuda (South Korea) Oh Chan-yeong | 7^{7} | 6
WC | (United States) Deiton Baughman (United States) Walker Duncan | 3 | 7 | [7]
(Russia) Boris Pokotilov (Poland) Jan Zieliński | 6 | 5 | [10]
(Italy) Matteo Berrettini (Italy) Andrea Pellegrino | 1 | 6^{3}
8 | (South Korea) Lee Duck-hee (Australia) Marc Polmans | 6 | 7^{7}

Second round
1 | (United States) S Kozlov (Russia) A Rublev
(Norway) V Durasovic (Romania) N Frunză | w/o
WC | (United States) S Kumar (United States) Ed Nava | 3 | 2
5 | (United States) TH Fritz (Netherlands) T van Rijthoven | 6 | 6
(Brazil) R Matos (Brazil) J Menezes | 7^{15} | 7^{7}
(Japan) S Fukuda (South Korea) C-y Oh | 6^{13} | 6^{4}
(Russia) B Pokotilov (Poland) J Zieliński | 6^{8} | 7^{9} | [11]
8 | (South Korea) D-h Lee (Australia) M Polmans | 7^{10} | 6^{7} | [13]

Quarterfinals
(Norway) V Durasovic (Romania) N Frunză | 7 | 6
5 | (United States) TH Fritz (Netherlands) T van Rijthoven | 5 | 4
(Brazil) R Matos (Brazil) J Menezes | 4 | 7 | [13]
8 | (South Korea) D-h Lee (Australia) M Polmans | 6 | 5 | [11]

Semifinals
(Norway) V Durasovic (Romania) N Frunză | 4 | 3
(Brazil) R Matos (Brazil) J Menezes | 6 | 6

=== Bottom half ===
First round
7 | (Cyprus) Petros Chrysochos (Croatia) Nino Serdarušić | 6 | 3 | [10]
(Argentina) Jordi Arconada (United States) Logan Smith | 3 | 6 | [2]
(Italy) Filippo Baldi (Austria) Lucas Miedler | 6 | 6
(Japan) Makoto Ochi (Japan) Yusuke Takahashi | 2 | 4
(South Korea) Chung Yun-seong (South Korea) Hong Seong-chan | 6 | 7
WC | (United States) Tommy Paul (United States) Henrik Wiersholm | 4 | 5
(Croatia) Domagoj Bilješko (Hungary) André Bíró | 6^{1} | 6^{4}
4 | (Argentina) Francisco Bahamonde (Argentina) Matías Zukas | 7^{7} | 7^{7}
6 | (Australia) Omar Jasika (Japan) Naoki Nakagawa | 6 | 7
(United States) Reilly Opelka (United States) Alex Rybakov | 2 | 5
(Russia) Alexander Bublik (Russia) Roman Safiullin | 5 | 7^{8} | [9]
(Peru) Pedro Iamachkine (Colombia) Luis Valero | 7 | 6^{6} | [11]
(Denmark) Benjamin Hannestad (Italy) Simone Roncalli | 6^{1} | 2
WC | (United States) John McNally (United States) Gianni Ross | 7^{7} | 6
(United States) Dennis Uspensky (Sweden) Mikael Ymer | 2 | 2
2 | (Brazil) Orlando Luz (Brazil) Marcelo Zormann | 6 | 6

Second round
7 | (Cyprus) P Chrysochos (Croatia) N Serdarušić | 3 | 6 | [4]
(Italy) F Baldi (Austria) L Miedler | 6 | 4 | [10]
(South Korea) Y Chung (South Korea) S-c Hong | 6 | 7
4 | (Argentina) F Bahamonde (Argentina) M Zukas | 2 | 5
6 | (Australia) O Jasika (Japan) N Nakagawa | 6 | 6
(Peru) P Iamachkine (Colombia) L Valero | 4 | 2
WC | (United States) J McNally (United States) G Ross | 4 | 6^{3}
2 | (Brazil) O Luz (Brazil) M Zormann | 6 | 7^{7}

Quarterfinals
(Italy) F Baldi (Austria) L Miedler | 6 | 6
(South Korea) Y Chung (South Korea) S-c Hong | 3 | 4
6 | (Australia) O Jasika (Japan) N Nakagawa | 6 | 1 | [10]
2 | (Brazil) O Luz (Brazil) M Zormann | 3 | 6 | [8]

Semifinals
(Italy) F Baldi (Austria) L Miedler | 6 | 1 | [11]
6 | (Australia) O Jasika (Japan) N Nakagawa | 2 | 6 | [13]
