= 2014 US Open – Women's singles =

Women's singles
- 2014 US Open

Final
- Champion: (United States) Serena Williams
- Runner-up: (Denmark) Caroline Wozniacki
- Score: 6–3, 6–3

Details
- Draw: 128 (16Q / 8WC)
- Seeds: 32

Events
Singles	men	women		boys	girls
Doubles	men	women	mixed	boys	girls
WC Singles	men	women	quad
WC Doubles	men	women	quad
Legends	men	women	mixed
- US Open

Two-time defending champion Serena Williams defeated Caroline Wozniacki in the final, 6–3, 6–3 to win the women's singles tennis title at the 2014 US Open. It was her sixth US Open singles title, a joint Open Era record (shared with Chris Evert), and 18th major singles title overall (tying her with Evert and Martina Navratilova for the second most grand slam singles titles in the Open Era). For the third time in her career, Williams did not lose a set during the tournament, and did not lose more than three games in any set. This was the first leg in her second 'Serena Slam', a non-calendar year Grand Slam.

The top three seeds (Williams, Simona Halep and Petra Kvitová) were in contention for the world No. 1 singles ranking. Williams retained the top position after Halep and Kvitová lost in the third round.

15-year-old CiCi Bellis was the youngest player to win a match at the US Open since Anna Kournikova in 1996.

== Seeds ==
1. (United States) Serena Williams (champion)
2. (Romania) Simona Halep (third round)
3. (Czech Republic) Petra Kvitová (third round)
4. (Poland) Agnieszka Radwańska (second round)
5. (Russia) Maria Sharapova (fourth round)
6. (Germany) Angelique Kerber (third round)
7. (Canada) Eugenie Bouchard (fourth round)
8. (Serbia) Ana Ivanovic (second round)
9. (Serbia) Jelena Janković (fourth round)
10. (Denmark) Caroline Wozniacki (final)
11. (Italy) Flavia Pennetta (quarterfinals)
12. (Slovakia) Dominika Cibulková (first round)
13. (Italy) Sara Errani (quarterfinals)
14. (Czech Republic) Lucie Šafářová (fourth round)
15. (Spain) Carla Suárez Navarro (third round)
16. (Belarus) Victoria Azarenka (quarterfinals)

17. (Russia) Ekaterina Makarova (semifinals)
18. (Germany) Andrea Petkovic (third round)
19. (United States) Venus Williams (third round)
20. (Russia) Svetlana Kuznetsova (first round)
21. (United States) Sloane Stephens (second round)
22. (France) Alizé Cornet (third round)
23. (Russia) Anastasia Pavlyuchenkova (second round)
24. (Australia) Samantha Stosur (second round)
25. (Spain) Garbiñe Muguruza (first round)
26. (Germany) Sabine Lisicki (third round)
27. (United States) Madison Keys (second round)
28. (Italy) Roberta Vinci (third round)
29. (Australia) Casey Dellacqua (fourth round)
30. (Czech Republic) Barbora Záhlavová-Strýcová (third round)
31. (Japan) Kurumi Nara (second round)
32. (China) Zhang Shuai (first round)

Click on the seed number of a player to go to their draw section.

== Draw ==
Key

- Q = Qualifier
- WC = Wild card
- LL = Lucky loser
- Alt = Alternate
- ITF = ITF entry
- PR = Protected ranking
- SR = Special ranking
- SE = Special exempt
- JE = Junior exempt
- JR = Junior Accelerator Programme entrant
- CO = College Accelerator Programme entrant
- NG = Next Gen Accelerator Program entrant
- w/o = Walkover
- r = Retired
- d = Defaulted

=== Finals ===
Quarterfinals
1	(United States) Serena Williams	6	6
11	(Italy) Flavia Pennetta	3	2
16	(Belarus) Victoria Azarenka	4	2
17	(Russia) Ekaterina Makarova	6	6
(Switzerland) Belinda Bencic	2	1
(China) Peng Shuai	6	6
10	(Denmark) Caroline Wozniacki	6	6
13	(Italy) Sara Errani	0	1

Semifinals
1	(United States) Serena Williams	6	6
17	(Russia) Ekaterina Makarova	1	3
(China) Peng Shuai	6^{1}	3^{r}
10	(Denmark) Caroline Wozniacki	7^{7}	4

Final
1	(United States) Serena Williams	6	6
10	(Denmark) Caroline Wozniacki	3	3

=== Top half ===
==== Section 1 ====
First round
1	(United States) S Williams	6	6
WC	(United States) T Townsend	3	1
(Italy) F Schiavone	3	6	3
(United States) V King	6	3	6
(United States) V Lepchenko	7	6
(Belgium) A Van Uytvanck	5	2
(Germany) M Barthel	6	6
32	(China) S Zhang	1	2
24	(Australia) S Stosur	6	6
(United States) L Davis	1	4
(France) P Parmentier	6^{3}	6	1
(Estonia) K Kanepi	7^{7}	3	6
(United States) C Vandeweghe	2	6	6
(Croatia) D Vekić	6	3	1
(Australia) A Tomljanović	6	2	1
15	(Spain) C Suárez Navarro	3	6	6

Second round
1	(United States) S Williams	6	6
(United States) V King	1	0
(United States) V Lepchenko	6	6
(Germany) M Barthel	4	0
24	(Australia) S Stosur	6	3	6^{8}
(Estonia) K Kanepi	3	6	7^{10}
(United States) C Vandeweghe	3	3
15	(Spain) C Suárez Navarro	6	6

Third round
1	(United States) S Williams	6	6
(United States) V Lepchenko	3	3
(Estonia) K Kanepi	7	6
15	(Spain) C Suárez Navarro	5	0

Fourth round
1	(United States) S Williams	6	6
(Estonia) K Kanepi	3	3

==== Section 2 ====
First round
11	(Italy) F Pennetta	6	4	6
(Germany) J Görges	3	6	1
(United States) S Rogers	6	6
Q	(Ukraine) M Zanevska	4	3
WC	(United States) N Gibbs	6	2	6
(France) C Garcia	2	6	3
(Brazil) T Pereira	2	0
23	(Russia) A Pavlyuchenkova	6	6
29	(Australia) C Dellacqua	7	6
(Austria) P Mayr-Achleitner	5	3
Q	(Poland) P Kania	2	0
Q	(China) Q Wang	6	6
(Czech Republic) Ka Plíšková	6	6
(Austria) Y Meusburger	2	2
(United States) A Riske	3	0
8	(Serbia) A Ivanovic	6	6

Second round
11	(Italy) F Pennetta	6	6
(United States) S Rogers	4	3
WC	(United States) N Gibbs	6	6^{6}	6
23	(Russia) A Pavlyuchenkova	4	7^{8}	3
29	(Australia) C Dellacqua	4	6	6
Q	(China) Q Wang	6	4	2
(Czech Republic) Ka Plíšková	7	6
8	(Serbia) A Ivanovic	5	4

Third round
11	(Italy) F Pennetta	6	6
WC	(United States) N Gibbs	4	0
29	(Australia) C Dellacqua	6	3	6
(Czech Republic) Ka Plíšková	3	6	4

Fourth round
11	(Italy) F Pennetta	7	6
29	(Australia) C Dellacqua	5	2

==== Section 3 ====
First round
3	(Czech Republic) P Kvitová	6	6
(France) K Mladenovic	1	0
(Czech Republic) K Koukalová	1	6	3
(Czech Republic) P Cetkovská	6	2	6
Q	(Serbia) A Krunić	6	6
(Poland) K Piter	4	1
WC	(Australia) J Gajdošová	0	3
27	(United States) M Keys	6	6
20	(Russia) S Kuznetsova	6	2	6^{3}
(New Zealand) M Erakovic	3	6	7^{7}
(Russia) E Vesnina	6	7
Q	(Chinese Taipei) Y-j Chan	0	5
(South Africa) C Scheepers	2	6	6^{5}
(United States) C McHale	6	1	7^{7}
(Japan) M Doi	7^{7}	4	1
16	(Belarus) V Azarenka	6^{3}	6	6

Second round
3	(Czech Republic) P Kvitová	6	6
(Czech Republic) P Cetkovská	4	2
Q	(Serbia) A Krunić	7^{7}	2	7
27	(United States) M Keys	6^{4}	6	5
(New Zealand) M Erakovic	5	6	4
(Russia) E Vesnina	7	2	6
(United States) C McHale	3	2
16	(Belarus) V Azarenka	6	6

Third round
3	(Czech Republic) P Kvitová	4	4
Q	(Serbia) A Krunić	6	6
(Russia) E Vesnina	1	1
16	(Belarus) V Azarenka	6	6

Fourth round
Q	(Serbia) A Krunić	6	4	4
16	(Belarus) V Azarenka	4	6	6

==== Section 4 ====
First round
12	(Slovakia) D Cibulková	1	6	4
WC	(United States) C Bellis	6	4	6
(Kazakhstan) Z Diyas	6	6
Q	(Ukraine) L Tsurenko	1	2
(Ukraine) E Svitolina	2	6^{4}
(Slovenia) P Hercog	6	7^{7}
WC	(United States) G Min	4	2
17	(Russia) E Makarova	6	6
30	(Czech Republic) B Záhlavová-Strýcová	6	6
Q	(Australia) A Barty	1	3
(Kazakhstan) Y Shvedova	7^{7}	1	5
(Romania) M Niculescu	6^{5}	6	7
(Romania) S Cîrstea	6	6
(United Kingdom) H Watson	1	1
(Belarus) O Govortsova	2	1
7	(Canada) E Bouchard	6	6

Second round
WC	(United States) C Bellis	3	6	2
(Kazakhstan) Z Diyas	6	0	6
(Slovenia) P Hercog	1	2
17	(Russia) E Makarova	6	6
30	(Czech Republic) B Záhlavová-Strýcová	4	6	6
(Romania) M Niculescu	6	4	2
(Romania) S Cîrstea	2	7^{7}	4
7	(Canada) E Bouchard	6	6^{4}	6

Third round
(Kazakhstan) Z Diyas	2	4
17	(Russia) E Makarova	6	6
30	(Czech Republic) B Záhlavová-Strýcová	2	7^{7}	4
7	(Canada) E Bouchard	6	6^{2}	6

Fourth round
17	(Russia) E Makarova	7^{7}	6
7	(Canada) E Bouchard	6^{2}	4

=== Bottom half ===
==== Section 5 ====
First round
6	(Germany) A Kerber	6	3	7
Q	(Russia) K Pervak	2	6	5
Q	(China) Y Duan	6	2	4
Q	(Russia) A Kudryavtseva	2	6	6
(Switzerland) B Bencic	6	6
(Belgium) Y Wickmayer	3	2
(Canada) A Wozniak	2	1
31	(Japan) K Nara	6	6
21	(United States) S Stephens	6	6
(Germany) A Beck	0	3
(France) V Razzano	0	0
(Sweden) J Larsson	6	6
(Italy) K Knapp	4	3
(Bulgaria) T Pironkova	6	6
(Serbia) B Jovanovski	2	3
9	(Serbia) J Janković	6	6

Second round
6	(Germany) A Kerber	6	6
Q	(Russia) A Kudryavtseva	2	4
(Switzerland) B Bencic	6	4	6
31	(Japan) K Nara	4	6	1
21	(United States) S Stephens	7	4	2
(Sweden) J Larsson	5	6	6
(Bulgaria) T Pironkova	5	4
9	(Serbia) J Janković	7	6

Third round
6	(Germany) A Kerber	1	5
(Switzerland) B Bencic	6	7
(Sweden) J Larsson	1	0
9	(Serbia) J Janković	6	6

Fourth round
(Switzerland) B Bencic	7^{8}	6
9	(Serbia) J Janković	6^{6}	3

==== Section 6 ====
First round
14	(Czech Republic) L Šafářová	6	7
(Hungary) T Babos	4	5
Q	(China) S Zheng	1	6	6
(Switzerland) S Vögele	6	2	2
PR	(Switzerland) R Oprandi	6	2	3
(Slovakia) D Hantuchová	4	6	6
WC	(France) A Hesse	1	2
22	(France) A Cornet	6	6
28	(Italy) R Vinci	6	6
(Argentina) P Ormaechea	3	3
(Romania) I-C Begu	7^{7}	6
(Spain) S Soler Espinosa	6^{4}	3
(China) S Peng	6	6
(China) J Zheng	3	3
(Canada) S Fichman	1	0
4	(Poland) A Radwańska	6	6

Second round
14	(Czech Republic) L Šafářová	6	4	6
Q	(China) S Zheng	3	6	2
(Slovakia) D Hantuchová	3	3
22	(France) A Cornet	6	6
28	(Italy) R Vinci	2	6	6
(Romania) I-C Begu	6	4	1
(China) S Peng	6	6
4	(Poland) A Radwańska	3	4

Third round
14	(Czech Republic) L Šafářová	6	6^{3}	6
22	(France) A Cornet	3	7^{7}	4
28	(Italy) R Vinci	4	3
(China) S Peng	6	6

Fourth round
14	(Czech Republic) L Šafářová	3	4
(China) S Peng	6	6

==== Section 7 ====
First round
5	(Russia) M Sharapova	6	6
(Russia) M Kirilenko	4	0
(Czech Republic) Kr Plíšková	3	4
(Romania) A Dulgheru	6	6
(Israel) J Glushko	3	2
WC	(United States) M Brengle	6	6
Q	(Canada) F Abanda	3	5
26	(Germany) S Lisicki	6	7
18	(Germany) A Petkovic	7^{9}	1	6
Q	(Tunisia) O Jabeur	6^{7}	6	3
(Czech Republic) T Smitková	6	3	3
(Puerto Rico) M Puig	3	6	6
(Slovakia) A Schmiedlová	4	3
Q	(Belarus) A Sasnovich	6	6
(Slovakia) M Rybáriková	1	6	0^{r}
10	(Denmark) C Wozniacki	6	3	2

Second round
5	(Russia) M Sharapova	4	6	6
(Romania) A Dulgheru	6	3	2
WC	(United States) M Brengle	4	1
26	(Germany) S Lisicki	6	6
18	(Germany) A Petkovic	3	6	7^{7}
(Puerto Rico) M Puig	6	3	6^{5}
Q	(Belarus) A Sasnovich	3	4
10	(Denmark) C Wozniacki	6	6

Third round
5	(Russia) M Sharapova	6	6
26	(Germany) S Lisicki	2	4
18	(Germany) A Petkovic	3	2
10	(Denmark) C Wozniacki	6	6

Fourth round
5	(Russia) M Sharapova	4	6	2
10	(Denmark) C Wozniacki	6	2	6

==== Section 8 ====
First round
13	(Italy) S Errani	6	7
(Belgium) K Flipkens	1	5
Q	(Australia) An Rodionova	1	7	6
(Italy) C Giorgi	6	5	3
(Netherlands) K Bertens	7^{9}	3^{r}
(Switzerland) T Bacsinszky	6^{7}	4
(Japan) K Date-Krumm	6	3	3
19	(United States) V Williams	2	6	6
25	(Spain) G Muguruza	3	6^{4}
Q	(Croatia) M Lučić-Baroni	6	7^{7}
(United Kingdom) J Konta	2	3
(Israel) S Pe'er	6	6
(Slovakia) J Čepelová	2	7	6
(Spain) MT Torró Flor	6	5	1
WC	(United States) D Collins	7^{7}	1	2
2	(Romania) S Halep	6^{2}	6	6

Second round
13	(Italy) S Errani	6	7^{7}
Q	(Australia) An Rodionova	4	6^{2}
(Switzerland) T Bacsinszky	1	4
19	(United States) V Williams	6	6
Q	(Croatia) M Lučić-Baroni	6^{6}	6	6
(Israel) S Pe'er	7^{8}	3	2
(Slovakia) J Čepelová	2	1
2	(Romania) S Halep	6	6

Third round
13	(Italy) S Errani	6	0	7^{7}
19	(United States) V Williams	0	6	6^{5}
Q	(Croatia) M Lučić-Baroni	7^{8}	6
2	(Romania) S Halep	6^{6}	2

Fourth round
13	(Italy) S Errani	6	2	6
Q	(Croatia) M Lučić-Baroni	3	6	0

== Championship match statistics ==
Category	(United States) S. Williams	(Denmark) Wozniacki
1st serve %	26/49 (53%)	41/65 (63%)
1st serve points won	20 of 26 = 77%	23 of 41 = 56%
2nd serve points won	12 of 23 = 52%	9 of 24 = 38%
Total service points won	32 of 49 = 65.31%	32 of 65 = 49.23%
Aces	7	3
Double faults	3	3
Winners	21	1
Unforced errors	23	15
Net points won	12 of 14 = 86%	3 of 4 = 75%
Break points converted	5 of 10 = 50%	2 of 4 = 50%
Return points won	33 of 65 = 51%	17 of 49 = 35%
Total points won	65	49

Preceded by 2014 Wimbledon Championships – Women's singles	Grand Slam women's singles	Succeeded by 2015 Australian Open – Women's singles
