= 2014 US Open – Wheelchair men's doubles =

Wheelchair men's doubles
- 2014 US Open

Final
- Champion: (France) Stéphane Houdet (Japan) Shingo Kunieda
- Runner-up: (United Kingdom) Gordon Reid (Netherlands) Maikel Scheffers
- Score: 6–2, 2–6, 7–6

Events
Singles	men	women		boys	girls
Doubles	men	women	mixed	boys	girls
WC Singles	men	women	quad
WC Doubles	men	women	quad
Legends	men	women	mixed
← 2013 ·	US Open	· 2015 →

Stéphane Houdet and Shingo Kunieda defeated the defending champion Maikel Scheffers and his partner Gordon Reid in the final, 6–2, 2–6, 7–6 to win the men's doubles wheelchair tennis title at the 2014 US Open. With the win, Houdet became the first men's doubles wheelchair player to complete the Grand Slam.

Michaël Jérémiasz and Scheffers were the defending champions, but did not participate together. Jérémiasz partnered Nicolas Peifer, but was defeated by Scheffers and Reid in the semifinals.

== Seeds ==
1. (France) Stéphane Houdet / (Japan) Shingo Kunieda (champions)
2. (United Kingdom) Gordon Reid / (Netherlands) Maikel Scheffers (final)

== Doubles ==
=== Key ===
- Q = Qualifier
- WC = Wild card
- LL = Lucky loser
- Alt = Alternate
- ITF = ITF entry
- PR = Protected ranking
- SR = Special ranking
- SE = Special exempt
- JE = Junior exempt
- JR = Junior Accelerator Programme entrant
- CO = College Accelerator Programme entrant
- NG = Next Gen Accelerator Program entrant
- w/o = Walkover
- r = Retired
- d = Defaulted

=== Bracket ===
Semifinals
1	(France) Stéphane Houdet (Japan) Shingo Kunieda	6	6
(Argentina) Gustavo Fernández (Belgium) Joachim Gérard	1	2
(France) Michaël Jeremiasz (France) Nicolas Peifer	4	6	4
2	(United Kingdom) Gordon Reid (Netherlands) Maikel Scheffers	6	3	6

Finals
1	(France) Stéphane Houdet (Japan) Shingo Kunieda	6	2	7^{7}
2	(United Kingdom) Gordon Reid (Netherlands) Maikel Scheffers	2	6	6^{4}
