= 2014 US Open – Women's doubles =

Women's doubles
- 2014 US Open

Final
- Champions: (Russia) Ekaterina Makarova (Russia) Elena Vesnina
- Runners-up: (Switzerland) Martina Hingis (Italy) Flavia Pennetta
- Score: 2–6, 6–3, 6–2

Details
- Draw: 64 (7 WC )
- Seeds: 16

Events
Singles	men	women		boys	girls
Doubles	men	women	mixed	boys	girls
WC Singles	men	women	quad
WC Doubles	men	women	quad
Legends	men	women	mixed
← 2013 ·	US Open	· 2015 →

Andrea Hlaváčková and Lucie Hradecká were the defending champions, but chose not to participate together. Hlaváčková played alongside Zheng Jie, but lost in the quarterfinals to Kimiko Date-Krumm and Barbora Záhlavová-Strýcová. Hradecká teamed up with Michaëlla Krajicek, but lost in the third round to Zarina Diyas and Xu Yifan.
Ekaterina Makarova and Elena Vesnina won their second Grand Slam doubles title together, defeating Martina Hingis and Flavia Pennetta in the final, 2–6, 6–3, 6–2.

== Seeds ==
1. (Italy) Sara Errani / (Italy) Roberta Vinci (second round)
2. (Chinese Taipei) Hsieh Su-wei / (China) Peng Shuai (third round)
3. (Zimbabwe) Cara Black / (India) Sania Mirza (semifinals)
4. (Russia) Ekaterina Makarova / (Russia) Elena Vesnina (champions)
5. (Czech Republic) Květa Peschke / (Slovenia) Katarina Srebotnik (quarterfinals)
6. (United States) Raquel Kops-Jones / (United States) Abigail Spears (first round)
7. (Hungary) Tímea Babos / (France) Kristina Mladenovic (first round)
8. (Czech Republic) Andrea Hlaváčková / (China) Zheng Jie (quarterfinals)
9. (Russia) Alla Kudryavtseva / (Australia) Anastasia Rodionova (third round)
10. (Australia) Ashleigh Barty / (Australia) Casey Dellacqua (first round)
11. (Czech Republic) Lucie Hradecká / (Netherlands) Michaëlla Krajicek (third round)
12. (Spain) Garbiñe Muguruza / (Spain) Carla Suárez Navarro (third round)
13. (Spain) Anabel Medina Garrigues / (Kazakhstan) Yaroslava Shvedova (second round)
14. (Chinese Taipei) Chan Hao-ching / (Chinese Taipei) Chan Yung-jan (second round)
15. (Russia) Anastasia Pavlyuchenkova / (Czech Republic) Lucie Šafářová (second round)
16. (Germany) Julia Görges / (Germany) Anna-Lena Grönefeld (first round)

== Draw ==
=== Key ===
- Q = Qualifier
- WC = Wild card
- LL = Lucky loser
- Alt = Alternate
- ITF = ITF entry
- PR = Protected ranking
- SR = Special ranking
- SE = Special exempt
- JE = Junior exempt
- JR = Junior Accelerator Programme entrant
- CO = College Accelerator Programme entrant
- NG = Next Gen Accelerator Program entrant
- w/o = Walkover
- r = Retired
- d = Defaulted

=== Finals ===
Quarterfinals
(Switzerland) Martina Hingis (Italy) Flavia Pennetta	6	6
5	(Czech Republic) Květa Peschke (Slovenia) Katarina Srebotnik	4	3
3	(Zimbabwe) Cara Black (India) Sania Mirza	6	1
(Kazakhstan) Zarina Diyas (China) Xu Yifan	1	0^{r}
(United States) Serena Williams (United States) Venus Williams	6^{5}	4
4	(Russia) Ekaterina Makarova (Russia) Elena Vesnina	7^{7}	6
8	(Czech Republic) Andrea Hlaváčková (China) Zheng Jie	3	6	3
(Japan) Kimiko Date-Krumm (Czech Republic) Barbora Záhlavová-Strýcová	6	4	6

Semifinals
(Switzerland) Martina Hingis (Italy) Flavia Pennetta	6	6
3	(Zimbabwe) Cara Black (India) Sania Mirza	2	4
4	(Russia) Ekaterina Makarova (Russia) Elena Vesnina	7	6
(Japan) Kimiko Date-Krumm (Czech Republic) Barbora Záhlavová-Strýcová	5	3

Final
(Switzerland) Martina Hingis (Italy) Flavia Pennetta	6	3	2
4	(Russia) Ekaterina Makarova (Russia) Elena Vesnina	2	6	6

=== Top half ===
==== Section 1 ====
First round
1	(Italy) S Errani (Italy) R Vinci	6	2	6
(Slovenia) A Klepač (Spain) MT Torró Flor	2	6	0
(Germany) K Barrois (Germany) A Beck	5	6	2
(Australia) J Gajdošová (Australia) A Tomljanović	7	4	6
(Switzerland) M Hingis (Italy) F Pennetta	6	3
(Germany) A Petkovic (Slovakia) M Rybáriková	1	0^{r}
(Switzerland) B Bencic (Slovakia) J Čepelová	6	6^{3}	3
15	(Russia) A Pavlyuchenkova (Czech Republic) L Šafářová	3	7^{7}	6
9	(Russia) A Kudryavtseva (Australia) A Rodionova	6	6
(Romania) R Olaru (Switzerland) S Vögele	1	4
WC	(United States) TA Black (United States) B Pera	6	4	3
(Romania) S Cîrstea (France) P Parmentier	2	6	6
(United States) V Lepchenko (China) S Zheng	6	6
WC	(United States) J Brady (United States) S Crawford	4	2
(Canada) S Fichman (South Africa) C Scheepers	4	6^{3}
5	(Czech Republic) K Peschke (Slovenia) K Srebotnik	6	7^{7}

Second round
1	(Italy) S Errani (Italy) R Vinci	4	6	4
(Australia) J Gajdošová (Australia) A Tomljanović	6	1	6
(Switzerland) M Hingis (Italy) F Pennetta	6	6
15	(Russia) A Pavlyuchenkova (Czech Republic) L Šafářová	3	0
9	(Russia) A Kudryavtseva (Australia) A Rodionova	6	6
(Romania) S Cîrstea (France) P Parmentier	2	2
(United States) V Lepchenko (China) S Zheng	4	4
5	(Czech Republic) K Peschke (Slovenia) K Srebotnik	6	6

Third round
(Australia) J Gajdošová (Australia) A Tomljanović	1	4
(Switzerland) M Hingis (Italy) F Pennetta	6	6
9	(Russia) A Kudryavtseva (Australia) A Rodionova	6	1	6^{4}
5	(Czech Republic) K Peschke (Slovenia) K Srebotnik	4	6	7^{7}

Quarterfinals
(Switzerland) M Hingis (Italy) F Pennetta	6	6
5	(Czech Republic) K Peschke (Slovenia) K Srebotnik	4	3

==== Section 2 ====
First round
3	(Zimbabwe) C Black (India) S Mirza	6	6
(Czech Republic) Ka Plíšková (Czech Republic) Kr Plíšková	3	0
(Slovakia) D Cibulková (Croatia) M Lučić-Baroni	3^{r}
(France) C Garcia (Romania) M Niculescu	4
(Serbia) J Janković (Czech Republic) K Koukalová	6	6
(Japan) S Aoyama (Japan) K Nara	2	1
WC	(United States) A Muhammad (United States) T Townsend	3	1
13	(Spain) A Medina Garrigues (Kazakhstan) Y Shvedova	6	6
11	(Czech Republic) L Hradecká (Netherlands) M Krajicek	6	7^{7}
(Czech Republic) T Smitková (Liechtenstein) S Vogt	4	6^{4}
(Slovakia) J Husárová (Poland) P Kania	6	6
(Serbia) B Jovanovski (Puerto Rico) M Puig	4	4
WC	(United States) N Gibbs (United States) M Sanchez	3	6	1
(United States) L Davis (Czech Republic) R Voráčová	6	4	6
(Kazakhstan) Z Diyas (China) Y Xu	6	2	6
6	(United States) R Kops-Jones (United States) A Spears	4	6	1

Second round
3	(Zimbabwe) C Black (India) S Mirza	6	6
(France) C Garcia (Romania) M Niculescu	1	2
(Serbia) J Janković (Czech Republic) K Koukalová	4	6	7
13	(Spain) A Medina Garrigues (Kazakhstan) Y Shvedova	6	2	5
11	(Czech Republic) L Hradecká (Netherlands) M Krajicek	6	6
(Slovakia) J Husárová (Poland) P Kania	3	2
(United States) L Davis (Czech Republic) R Voráčová	3	6^{6}
(Kazakhstan) Z Diyas (China) Y Xu	6	7^{8}

Third round
3	(Zimbabwe) C Black (India) S Mirza	6	6
(Serbia) J Janković (Czech Republic) K Koukalová	3	2
11	(Czech Republic) L Hradecká (Netherlands) M Krajicek	6^{3}	2
(Kazakhstan) Z Diyas (China) Y Xu	7^{7}	6

Quarterfinals
3	(Zimbabwe) C Black (India) S Mirza	6	1
(Kazakhstan) Z Diyas (China) Y Xu	1	0	r

=== Bottom half ===
==== Section 3 ====
First round
7	(Hungary) T Babos (France) K Mladenovic	6^{0}	7^{7}	1
(United States) S Williams (United States) V Williams	7^{7}	6^{4}	6
(Georgia (country)) O Kalashnikova (Ukraine) O Savchuk	2	6	6
(Switzerland) R Oprandi (United States) S Rogers	6	1	0
(New Zealand) M Erakovic (Spain) A Parra Santonja	6	6
WC	(United States) L Chirico (United States) K Stewart	4	3
(France) A Cornet (Belgium) K Flipkens	5	4
12	(Spain) G Muguruza (Spain) C Suárez Navarro	7	6
16	(Germany) J Görges (Germany) A Grönefeld	3	7	6^{2}
(United States) V King (United States) L Raymond	6	5	7^{7}
(United States) C McHale (Slovakia) A Schmiedlová	6	6
(Belgium) A Van Uytvanck (Belgium) Y Wickmayer	3	1
(Czech Republic) P Cetkovská (Poland) K Piter	6	6
WC	(United States) G Min (United States) M Oudin	3	3
(Slovakia) D Hantuchová (Italy) F Schiavone	2	4
4	(Russia) E Makarova (Russia) E Vesnina	6	6

Second round
(United States) S Williams (United States) V Williams	6	6
(Georgia (country)) O Kalashnikova (Ukraine) O Savchuk	2	1
(New Zealand) M Erakovic (Spain) A Parra Santonja	7^{7}	3	3
12	(Spain) G Muguruza (Spain) C Suárez Navarro	6^{5}	6	6
(United States) V King (United States) L Raymond	6	6
(United States) C McHale (Slovakia) A Schmiedlová	0	2
(Czech Republic) P Cetkovská (Poland) K Piter	4	1
4	(Russia) E Makarova (Russia) E Vesnina	6	6

Third round
(United States) S Williams (United States) V Williams	6	6
12	(Spain) G Muguruza (Spain) C Suárez Navarro	1	0
(United States) V King (United States) L Raymond	3	7^{7}	2
4	(Russia) E Makarova (Russia) E Vesnina	6	6^{4}	6

Quarterfinals
(United States) S Williams (United States) V Williams	6^{5}	4
4	(Russia) E Makarova (Russia) E Vesnina	7^{7}	6

==== Section 4 ====
First round
8	(Czech Republic) A Hlaváčková (China) J Zheng	6	6
Alt	(Netherlands) K Bertens (Israel) S Pe'er	0	1
(United States) A Riske (United States) C Vandeweghe	7	6
(Spain) S Soler Espinosa (United Kingdom) H Watson	5	3
(Germany) M Barthel (Russia) A Panova	5	6	6^{4}
(Japan) M Doi (Ukraine) E Svitolina	7	3	7^{7}
(Canada) G Dabrowski (Poland) A Rosolska	6	6
10	(Australia) A Barty (Australia) C Dellacqua	2	3
14	(Chinese Taipei) H-c Chan (Chinese Taipei) Y-j Chan	6	6
(Switzerland) T Bacsinszky (Croatia) D Vekić	1	1
(Japan) K Date-Krumm (Czech Republic) B Záhlavová-Strýcová	7	4	6
WC	(United States) I Falconi (United States) A Tatishvili	5	6	3
(Croatia) D Jurak (United States) M Moulton-Levy	6	6
(Ukraine) Y Beygelzimer (Austria) Y Meusburger	4	3
(Romania) I-C Begu (Italy) K Knapp	6	5	3
2	(Chinese Taipei) S-w Hsieh (China) S Peng	4	7	6

Second round
8	(Czech Republic) A Hlaváčková (China) J Zheng	6^{2}	6	6
(United States) A Riske (United States) C Vandeweghe	7^{7}	3	3
(Japan) M Doi (Ukraine) E Svitolina	6	2	4
(Canada) G Dabrowski (Poland) A Rosolska	4	6	6
14	(Chinese Taipei) H-c Chan (Chinese Taipei) Y-j Chan	3	2
(Japan) K Date-Krumm (Czech Republic) B Záhlavová-Strýcová	6	6
(Croatia) D Jurak (United States) M Moulton-Levy	4	2
2	(Chinese Taipei) S-w Hsieh (China) S Peng	6	6

Third round
8	(Czech Republic) A Hlaváčková (China) J Zheng	6	6
(Canada) G Dabrowski (Poland) A Rosolska	4	3
(Japan) K Date-Krumm (Czech Republic) B Záhlavová-Strýcová	7^{7}	6
2	(Chinese Taipei) S-w Hsieh (China) S Peng	6^{4}	4

Quarterfinals
8	(Czech Republic) A Hlaváčková (China) J Zheng	3	6	3
(Japan) K Date-Krumm (Czech Republic) B Záhlavová-Strýcová	6	4	6
