= 2014 US Open – Wheelchair women's doubles =

Wheelchair women's doubles
- 2014 US Open

Final
- Champion: (Japan) Yui Kamiji (United Kingdom) Jordanne Whiley
- Runner-up: (Netherlands) Jiske Griffioen (Netherlands) Aniek Van Koot
- Score: 6–4, 3–6, 6–3

Events
Singles	men	women		boys	girls
Doubles	men	women	mixed	boys	girls
WC Singles	men	women	quad
WC Doubles	men	women	quad
Legends	men	women	mixed
← 2013 ·	US Open	· 2015 →

Yui Kamiji and Jordanne Whiley defeated the defending champions Jiske Griffioen and Aniek Van Koot in the final, 6–4, 3–6, 6–3 to win the women's doubles wheelchair tennis title at the 2014 US Open. With the win, they completed the Grand Slam, and each completed the career Grand Slam.

== Seeds ==
1. (Japan) Yui Kamiji / (United Kingdom) Jordanne Whiley (Winner)
2. (Netherlands) Jiske Griffioen / (Netherlands) Aniek van Koot (final)

== Doubles ==
=== Key ===
- Q = Qualifier
- WC = Wild card
- LL = Lucky loser
- Alt = Alternate
- ITF = ITF entry
- PR = Protected ranking
- SR = Special ranking
- SE = Special exempt
- JE = Junior exempt
- JR = Junior Accelerator Programme entrant
- CO = College Accelerator Programme entrant
- NG = Next Gen Accelerator Program entrant
- w/o = Walkover
- r = Retired
- d = Defaulted

=== Bracket ===
Semifinals
1	(Japan) Yui Kamiji (United Kingdom) Jordanne Whiley	w/o
(Germany) Sabine Ellerbrock (South Africa) Kgothatso Montjane
(Netherlands) Marjolein Buis (Netherlands) Sharon Walraven	0	3
2	(Netherlands) Jiske Griffioen (Netherlands) Aniek van Koot	6	6

Finals
1	(Japan) Yui Kamiji (United Kingdom) Jordanne Whiley	6	3	6
2	(Netherlands) Jiske Griffioen (Netherlands) Aniek van Koot	4	6	3
