= 2014 US Open – Women's champions invitational =

Women's champions invitational
- 2014 US Open

Final
- Champions: (United States) Martina Navratilova (Czech Republic) Jana Novotná
- Runners-up: (United States) Tracy Austin (United States) Gigi Fernández
- Score: 6–4, 6–4

Events
Singles	men	women		boys	girls
Doubles	men	women	mixed	boys	girls
WC Singles	men	women	quad
WC Doubles	men	women	quad
Legends	men	women	mixed
← 2013 ·	US Open	· 2015 →

Martina Navratilova and Jana Novotná won the title by defeating Tracy Austin and Gigi Fernández in the final in two sets.

== Draw ==
=== Key ===
- Q = Qualifier
- WC = Wild card
- LL = Lucky loser
- Alt = Alternate
- ITF = ITF entry
- PR = Protected ranking
- SR = Special ranking
- SE = Special exempt
- JE = Junior exempt
- JR = Junior Accelerator Programme entrant
- CO = College Accelerator Programme entrant
- NG = Next Gen Accelerator Program entrant
- w/o = Walkover
- r = Retired
- d = Defaulted

Semifinal
(Croatia) Iva Majoli (United States) Chanda Rubin	1	3
(United States) Martina Navratilova (Czech Republic) Jana Novotná	6	6
(United States) Tracy Austin (United States) Gigi Fernández	7	6
(United States) Lindsay Davenport (United States) Mary Joe Fernández	5	1

Final
(United States) Martina Navratilova (Czech Republic) Jana Novotná	6	6
(United States) Tracy Austin (United States) Gigi Fernández	4	4
