= 2014 US Open – Wheelchair quad singles =

Wheelchair quad singles
- 2014 US Open

Final
- Champion: (United Kingdom) Andrew Lapthorne
- Runner-up: (United States) David Wagner
- Score: 7–5, 6–2

Events
Singles	men	women		boys	girls
Doubles	men	women	mixed	boys	girls
WC Singles	men	women	quad
WC Doubles	men	women	quad
Legends	men	women	mixed
← 2013 ·	US Open	· 2015 →

Andrew Lapthorne defeated David Wagner in the final, 7–5, 6–2 to win the quad singles wheelchair tennis title at the 2014 US Open.

Lucas Sithole was the defending champion, but was eliminated in the round-robin stage.

== Draw ==
=== Key ===
- Q = Qualifier
- WC = Wild card
- LL = Lucky loser
- Alt = Alternate
- SE = Special exempt
- PR = Protected ranking
- ITF = ITF entry
- JE = Junior exempt
- w/o = Walkover
- r = Retired
- d = Defaulted
- SR = Special ranking

=== Final ===
Final
(United States) David Wagner	5	2
(United Kingdom) Andrew Lapthorne	7	6

=== Round robin ===
	(South Africa) L Sithole	(United States) D Wagner	(United Kingdom) A Lapthorne	(United States) N Taylor	RR W–L	Set W–L	Game W–L	Standings
(South Africa) Lucas Sithole		7–5, 2–6, 6–3	2–6, 3–6	7– 5, 6–3	2–1	4–3	33–34	3
(United States) David Wagner	5–7, 6–2, 3–6		6–3, 6–1	6–0, 6–0	2–1	5–2	38–19	1
(United Kingdom) Andrew Lapthorne	6–2, 6–3	3–6, 1–6		6–4, 6–3	2–1	4–2	28–24	2
(United States) Nick Taylor	5–7, 3–6	0–6, 0–6	4–6, 3–6		0–3	0–6	15–37	4

Standings are determined by: 1. number of wins; 2. number of matches; 3. in two-players-ties, head-to-head records; 4. in three-players-ties, percentage of sets won, or of games won; 5. steering-committee decision.
