= 2014 US Open – Mixed doubles =

Mixed doubles
- 2014 US Open

Final
- Champions: (India) Sania Mirza (Brazil) Bruno Soares
- Runners-up: (United States) Abigail Spears (Mexico) Santiago González
- Score: 6–1, 2–6, [11–9]

Details
- Draw: 32
- Seeds: 8

Events
Singles	men	women		boys	girls
Doubles	men	women	mixed	boys	girls
WC Singles	men	women	quad
WC Doubles	men	women	quad
Legends	men	women	mixed
- US Open

Andrea Hlaváčková and Max Mirnyi were the defending champions, but chose not to participate together. Hlaváčková played alongside Alexander Peya, but lost in the second round to Taylor Townsend and Donald Young. Mirnyi teamed up with Chan Hao-ching, but lost in the second round to Ashleigh Barty and John Peers.

Sania Mirza and Bruno Soares won the title, defeating Abigail Spears and Santiago González 6–1, 2–6, [11–9] in the final.

== Seeds ==
1. (India) Sania Mirza / (Brazil) Bruno Soares (champions)
2. (Czech Republic) Andrea Hlaváčková / (Austria) Alexander Peya (second round)
3. (Zimbabwe) Cara Black / (India) Leander Paes (quarterfinals)
4. (France) Kristina Mladenovic / (Canada) Daniel Nestor (first round)
5. (Czech Republic) Lucie Hradecká / (Romania) Horia Tecău (first round)
6. (Slovenia) Katarina Srebotnik / (India) Rohan Bopanna (quarterfinals)
7. (Germany) Julia Görges / (Serbia) Nenad Zimonjić (first round)
8. (United States) Raquel Kops-Jones / (Colombia) Juan Sebastián Cabal (first round)

== Draw ==
Key

- Q = Qualifier
- WC = Wild card
- LL = Lucky loser
- Alt = Alternate
- ITF = ITF entry
- PR = Protected ranking
- SR = Special ranking
- SE = Special exempt
- JE = Junior exempt
- JR = Junior Accelerator Programme entrant
- CO = College Accelerator Programme entrant
- NG = Next Gen Accelerator Program entrant
- w/o = Walkover
- r = Retired
- d = Defaulted

=== Finals ===
Semifinals
1	(India) Sania Mirza (Brazil) Bruno Soares	7	4	[10]
(Chinese Taipei) Chan Yung-jan (United Kingdom) Ross Hutchins	5	6	[7]
(United States) Abigail Spears (Mexico) Santiago González	6	6
WC	(United States) Taylor Townsend (United States) Donald Young	3	4

Final
1	(India) Sania Mirza (Brazil) Bruno Soares	6	2	[11]
(United States) Abigail Spears (Mexico) Santiago González	1	6	[9]

=== Top half ===
First round
1	(India) S Mirza (Brazil) B Soares	6	3	[10]
WC	(United States) TA Black (United States) E Escobedo	2	6	[5]
(Australia) C Dellacqua (United Kingdom) J Murray	3	6	[13]
(Ukraine) E Svitolina (Romania) F Mergea	6	1	[11]
(Spain) A Medina Garrigues (South Africa) R Klaasen	7^{7}	6
(Netherlands) M Krajicek (Croatia) M Draganja	6^{1}	2
WC	(United States) L Davis (United States) N Monroe	6	2	[0]
6	(Slovenia) K Srebotnik (India) R Bopanna	3	6	[10]
4	(France) K Mladenovic (Canada) D Nestor	6^{5}	6	[6]
(Chinese Taipei) Y-j Chan (United Kingdom) R Hutchins	7^{7}	3	[10]
WC	(United States) M Oudin (United States) R Ram	6	6
Alt	(Czech Republic) K Koukalová (Czech Republic) J Levinský	1	4
(Czech Republic) K Peschke (Poland) M Matkowski	4	6	[11]
Alt	(United States) L Raymond (United States) S Lipsky	6	3	[9]
WC	(United States) C McHale (United States) S Kozlov	7	2	[12]
7	(Germany) J Görges (Serbia) N Zimonjić	5	6	[10]

Second round
1	(India) S Mirza (Brazil) B Soares	6	7^{10}
(Australia) C Dellacqua (United Kingdom) J Murray	2	6^{8}
(Spain) A Medina Garrigues (South Africa) R Klaasen	3	4
6	(Slovenia) K Srebotnik (India) R Bopanna	6	6
(Chinese Taipei) Y-j Chan (United Kingdom) R Hutchins	6	2	[13]
WC	(United States) M Oudin (United States) R Ram	2	6	[11]
(Czech Republic) K Peschke (Poland) M Matkowski	5	6	[10]
WC	(United States) C McHale (United States) S Kozlov	7	2	[8]

Quarterfinals
1	(India) S Mirza (Brazil) B Soares	7	2	[10]
6	(Slovenia) K Srebotnik (India) R Bopanna	5	6	[5]
(Chinese Taipei) Y-j Chan (United Kingdom) R Hutchins	6	1
(Czech Republic) K Peschke (Poland) M Matkowski	3	2^{r}

Semifinals
1	(India) S Mirza (Brazil) B Soares	7	4	[10]
(Chinese Taipei) Y-j Chan (United Kingdom) R Hutchins	5	6	[7]

=== Bottom half ===
First round
8	(United States) R Kops-Jones (Colombia) JS Cabal	6	3	[5]
(Australia) A Rodionova (Colombia) R Farah	4	6	[10]
(United States) A Spears (Mexico) S González	7^{8}	1	[10]
(Hungary) T Babos (United States) E Butorac	6^{6}	6	[5]
(Russia) A Kudryavtseva (Pakistan) A-u-H Qureshi	7^{7}	6
WC	(United States) S Rogers (United States) B Klahn	6^{1}	3
(Germany) A-L Grönefeld (Netherlands) J-J Rojer	3	6	[8]
3	(Zimbabwe) C Black (India) L Paes	6	4	[10]
5	(Czech Republic) L Hradecká (Romania) H Tecău	3	3
(Chinese Taipei) H-c Chan (Belarus) M Mirnyi	6	6
(Australia) A Barty (Australia) J Peers	6	6
WC	(United States) A Muhammad (United States) TH Fritz	2	2
WC	(United States) T Townsend (United States) D Young	7	6
WC	(United States) J Cako (United States) J Kielbowicz	5	3
(Spain) A Parra Santonja (Spain) D Marrero	3	7	[9]
2	(Czech Republic) A Hlaváčková (Austria) A Peya	6	5	[11]

Second round
(Australia) A Rodionova (Colombia) R Farah	7	3	[9]
(United States) A Spears (Mexico) S González	5	6	[11]
(Russia) A Kudryavtseva (Pakistan) A-u-H Qureshi	1	6	[4]
3	(Zimbabwe) C Black (India) L Paes	6	4	[10]
(Chinese Taipei) H-c Chan (Belarus) M Mirnyi	3	2
(Australia) A Barty (Australia) J Peers	6	6
WC	(United States) T Townsend (United States) D Young	6	6
2	(Czech Republic) A Hlaváčková (Austria) A Peya	3	3

Quarterfinals
(United States) A Spears (Mexico) S González	6	4	[10]
3	(Zimbabwe) C Black (India) L Paes	4	6	[8]
(Australia) A Barty (Australia) J Peers	6	6^{3}	[5]
WC	(United States) T Townsend (United States) D Young	2	7^{7}	[10]

Semifinals
(United States) A Spears (Mexico) S González	6	6
WC	(United States) T Townsend (United States) D Young	3	4
