= 2014 US Open – Men's champions invitational =

Men's champions invitational
- 2014 US Open

Final
- Champions: (Australia) Pat Cash (United States) Todd Martin
- Runners-up: (United States) John McEnroe (United States) Patrick McEnroe
- Score: 3–6, 6–3, [10–3]

Events
| Singles | men | women | | boys | girls |
| Doubles | men | women | mixed | boys | girls |
| WC Singles | men | women | quad |
| WC Doubles | men | women | quad |
| Legends | men | women | mixed |
| ← 2013 · | US Open | · 2015 → |

Pat Cash and Todd Martin won the title by defeating brothers John and Patrick McEnroe in the final in three sets.

== Draw ==
=== Key ===
- Q = Qualifier
- WC = Wild card
- LL = Lucky loser
- Alt = Alternate
- ITF = ITF entry
- PR = Protected ranking
- SR = Special ranking
- SE = Special exempt
- JE = Junior exempt
- JR = Junior Accelerator Programme entrant
- CO = College Accelerator Programme entrant
- NG = Next Gen Accelerator Program entrant
- w/o = Walkover
- r = Retired
- d = Defaulted

Semifinal
(United States) Michael Chang (Australia) Mark Philippoussis | 2 | 4
(Australia) Pat Cash (United States) Todd Martin | 6 | 6
(United States) John McEnroe (United States) Patrick McEnroe | 6 | 7^{8}
(France) Henri Leconte (Sweden) Mats Wilander | 1 | 6^{6}

Final
(Australia) Pat Cash (United States) Todd Martin | 5 | 6 | [10]
(United States) John McEnroe (United States) Patrick McEnroe | 7 | 3 | [8]
