= 2014 US Open – Girls' doubles =

Girls' doubles
- 2014 US Open

Final
- Champions: (Turkey) İpek Soylu (Switzerland) Jil Teichmann
- Runners-up: (Belarus) Vera Lapko (Slovakia) Tereza Mihalíková
- Score: 5–7, 6–2, [10–7]

Events
Singles	men	women		boys	girls
Doubles	men	women	mixed	boys	girls
WC Singles	men	women	quad
WC Doubles	men	women	quad
Legends	men	women	mixed
- US Open

Barbora Krejčíková and Kateřina Siniaková were the defending champions, having won the event in 2013, however both players chose not to participate. İpek Soylu and Jil Teichmann won the tournament by defeating Vera Lapko and Tereza Mihalíková in the final.

== Seeds ==
1. (United States) CiCi Bellis / (Czech Republic) Markéta Vondroušová (quarterfinals; withdrew)
2. (Ukraine) Anhelina Kalinina / (Belarus) Iryna Shymanovich (second round)
3. (Spain) Paula Badosa / (Spain) Aliona Bolsova Zadoinov (second round)
4. (Ukraine) Olga Fridman / (Latvia) Jeļena Ostapenko (quarterfinals; withdrew)
5. (Australia) Naiktha Bains / (United States) Tornado Alicia Black (first round)
6. (Turkey) İpek Soylu / (Switzerland) Jil Teichmann (champions)
7. (Slovakia) Viktória Kužmová / (Slovakia) Kristína Schmiedlová (semifinals)
8. (Russia) Anna Kalinskaya / (Russia) Evgeniya Levashova (second round)

== Draw ==
Key

- Q = Qualifier
- WC = Wild card
- LL = Lucky loser
- Alt = Alternate
- ITF = ITF entry
- PR = Protected ranking
- SR = Special ranking
- SE = Special exempt
- JE = Junior exempt
- JR = Junior Accelerator Programme entrant
- CO = College Accelerator Programme entrant
- NG = Next Gen Accelerator Program entrant
- w/o = Walkover
- r = Retired
- d = Defaulted

=== Finals ===
Semifinals
7	(Slovakia) Viktória Kužmová (Slovakia) Kristína Schmiedlová	3	1
6	(Turkey) İpek Soylu (Switzerland) Jil Teichmann	6	6
(United Kingdom) Maia Lumsden (Hungary) Fanni Stollár	3	3
(Belarus) Vera Lapko (Slovakia) Tereza Mihalíková	6	6

Final
6	(Turkey) İpek Soylu (Switzerland) Jil Teichmann	5	6	[10]
(Belarus) Vera Lapko (Slovakia) Tereza Mihalíková	7	2	[7]

=== Top half ===
First round
1	(United States) CiCi Bellis (Czech Republic) Markéta Vondroušová	6	6
(Czech Republic) Marie Bouzková (Belgium) Greet Minnen	4	2
(United States) Raveena Kingsley (Canada) Katherine Sebov	4	6	[7]
(Hungary) Anna Bondár (Hungary) Dalma Gálfi	6	4	[10]
(United States) Madison Bourguignon (United States) Ena Shibahara	7^{7}	3	[4]
(France) Lucie Wargnier (France) Margot Yerolymos	6^{5}	6	[10]
(United States) Jessica Ho (Egypt) Sandra Samir	5	3
7	(Slovakia) Viktória Kužmová (Slovakia) Kristína Schmiedlová	7	6
3	(Spain) Paula Badosa (Spain) Aliona Bolsova Zadoinov	6	6
(Russia) Anna Blinkova (Russia) Anastasiya Komardina	3	1
(Indonesia) Tami Grende (Brazil) Luisa Stefani	7^{7}	6
WC	(United States) Kelly Chen (United States) Claire Liu	6^{3}	4
(United Kingdom) Gabriella Taylor (Russia) Natalia Vikhlyantseva	6^{5}	7	[8]
(United States) Katrine Steffensen (Mexico) Renata Zarazúa	7^{7}	5	[10]
(Czech Republic) Miriam Kolodziejová (Slovenia) Tamara Zidanšek	4	4
6	(Turkey) İpek Soylu (Switzerland) Jil Teichmann	6	6

Second round
1	(United States) CC Bellis (Czech Republic) M Vondroušová	6	7^{7}
(Hungary) A Bondár (Hungary) D Gálfi	1	6^{3}
(France) L Wargnier (France) M Yerolymos	4	3
7	(Slovakia) V Kužmová (Slovakia) K Schmiedlová	6	6
3	(Spain) P Badosa (Spain) A Bolsova Zadoinov	6^{5}	4
(Indonesia) T Grende (Brazil) L Stefani	7^{7}	6
(United States) K Steffensen (Mexico) R Zarazúa	4	1
6	(Turkey) İ Soylu (Switzerland) J Teichmann	6	6

Quarterfinals
1	(United States) CC Bellis (Czech Republic) M Vondroušová
7	(Slovakia) V Kužmová (Slovakia) K Schmiedlová	w/o
(Indonesia) T Grende (Brazil) L Stefani	2	5
6	(Turkey) İ Soylu (Switzerland) J Teichmann	6	7

Semifinals
7	(Slovakia) V Kužmová (Slovakia) K Schmiedlová	3	1
6	(Turkey) İ Soylu (Switzerland) J Teichmann	6	6

=== Bottom half ===
First round
8	(Russia) Anna Kalinskaya (Russia) Evgeniya Levashova	7^{7}	6
(United Kingdom) Katie Boulter (Czech Republic) Simona Heinová	6^{4}	1
WC	(United States) Kylie McKenzie (United States) Ryan Peus	5	3
(United Kingdom) Maia Lumsden (Hungary) Fanni Stollár	7	6
(United States) Dasha Ivanova (China) Ye Qiuyu	1	2
(Romania) Ioana Loredana Roșca (United Kingdom) Isabelle Wallace	6	6
(Italy) Verena Hofer (Italy) Bianca Turati	2	5
4	(Ukraine) Olga Fridman (Latvia) Jeļena Ostapenko	6	7
5	(Australia) Naiktha Bains (United States) Tornado Alicia Black	4	2
(Belarus) Vera Lapko (Slovakia) Tereza Mihalíková	6	6
(Romania) Jaqueline Adina Cristian (Romania) Elena Gabriela Ruse	6^{5}	6	[3]
(United States) Caroline Dolehide (United States) Ingrid Neel	7^{7}	4	[10]
(United Kingdom) Freya Christie (United Kingdom) Katie Swan	6	6
(United States) Usue Maitane Arconada (Australia) Kimberly Birrell	3	0
(United States) Michaela Gordon (United States) Sofia Kenin	2	2
2	(Ukraine) Anhelina Kalinina (Belarus) Iryna Shymanovich	6	6

Second round
8	(Russia) A Kalinskaya (Russia) E Levashova	3	6^{4}
(United Kingdom) M Lumsden (Hungary) F Stollár	6	7^{7}
(Romania) IL Roșca (United Kingdom) I Wallace	6	1	[11]
4	(Ukraine) O Fridman (Latvia) J Ostapenko	2	6	[13]
(Belarus) V Lapko (Slovakia) T Mihalíková	6	6
(United States) C Dolehide (United States) I Neel	3	4
(United Kingdom) F Christie (United Kingdom) K Swan	7^{10}	6
2	(Ukraine) A Kalinina (Belarus) I Shymanovich	6^{8}	4

Quarterfinals
(United Kingdom) M Lumsden (Hungary) F Stollár	w/o
4	(Ukraine) O Fridman (Latvia) J Ostapenko
(Belarus) V Lapko (Slovakia) T Mihalíková	6	3	[10]
(United Kingdom) F Christie (United Kingdom) K Swan	4	6	[4]

Semifinals
(United Kingdom) M Lumsden (Hungary) F Stollár	3	3
(Belarus) V Lapko (Slovakia) T Mihalíková	6	6
