= 2014 US Open – Wheelchair women's singles =

Wheelchair women's singles
- 2014 US Open

Final
- Champion: (Japan) Yui Kamiji
- Runner-up: (Netherlands) Aniek van Koot
- Score: 6–3, 6–3

Events
| Singles | men | women | | boys | girls |
| Doubles | men | women | mixed | boys | girls |
| WC Singles | men | women | quad |
| WC Doubles | men | women | quad |
| Legends | men | women | mixed |
| ← 2013 · | US Open | · 2015 → |

Yui Kamiji defeated the defending champion Aniek van Koot in the final, 6–3, 6–3 to win the women's singles wheelchair tennis title at the 2014 US Open.

== Seeds ==
1. (Japan) Yui Kamiji (champion)
2. (Netherlands) Aniek van Koot (final)

== Draw ==
=== Key ===
- Q = Qualifier
- WC = Wild card
- LL = Lucky loser
- Alt = Alternate
- ITF = ITF entry
- PR = Protected ranking
- SR = Special ranking
- SE = Special exempt
- JE = Junior exempt
- JR = Junior Accelerator Programme entrant
- CO = College Accelerator Programme entrant
- NG = Next Gen Accelerator Program entrant
- w/o = Walkover
- r = Retired
- d = Defaulted

=== Bracket ===
Quarterfinals
1 | (Japan) Yui Kamiji | 6 | 6
(Netherlands) Sharon Walraven | 1 | 3
(Netherlands) Jiske Griffioen | 6 | 6
(Germany) Sabine Ellerbrock | 1 | 1
(Netherlands) Marjolein Buis | 6 | 6
(United Kingdom) Jordanne Whiley | 1 | 4
(South Africa) Kgothatso Montjane | 2 | 0
2 | (Netherlands) Aniek van Koot | 6 | 6

Semifinals
1 | (Japan) Yui Kamiji | 3 | 6 | 6
(Netherlands) Jiske Griffioen | 6 | 2 | 3
(Netherlands) Marjolein Buis | 1 | 3
2 | (Netherlands) Aniek van Koot | 6 | 6

Finals
1 | (Japan) Yui Kamiji | 6 | 6
2 | (Netherlands) Aniek van Koot | 3 | 3
