= 2014 US Open – Wheelchair men's singles =

Wheelchair men's singles
- 2014 US Open

Final
- Champion: (Japan) Shingo Kunieda
- Runner-up: (Argentina) Gustavo Fernández
- Score: 7–6^{(7–0)}, 6–4

Events
Singles	men	women		boys	girls
Doubles	men	women	mixed	boys	girls
WC Singles	men	women	quad
WC Doubles	men	women	quad
Legends	men	women	mixed
← 2013 ·	US Open	· 2015 →

Shingo Kunieda defeated Gustavo Fernández in the final, 7–6^{(7–0)}, 6–4 to win the men's singles wheelchair tennis title at the 2014 US Open. It was his fifth US Open singles title and 16th major singles title overall.

Stéphane Houdet was the defending champion, but was defeated by Fernández in the semifinals.

== Seeds ==
1. (Japan) Shingo Kunieda (champion)
2. (France) Stéphane Houdet (semifinals)

== Draw ==
=== Key ===
- Q = Qualifier
- WC = Wild card
- LL = Lucky loser
- Alt = Alternate
- ITF = ITF entry
- PR = Protected ranking
- SR = Special ranking
- SE = Special exempt
- JE = Junior exempt
- JR = Junior Accelerator Programme entrant
- CO = College Accelerator Programme entrant
- NG = Next Gen Accelerator Program entrant
- w/o = Walkover
- r = Retired
- d = Defaulted

=== Bracket ===
Quarterfinals
1	(Japan) Shingo Kunieda	6	6
(France) Michaël Jeremiasz	1	1
(France) Nicolas Peifer	2	6	6
(Netherlands) Maikel Scheffers	6	1	1
(Argentina) Gustavo Fernández	6	3	6
(United Kingdom) Gordon Reid	4	6	3
(Belgium) Joachim Gérard	6	6^{5}	5
2	(France) Stéphane Houdet	3	7^{7}	7

Semifinals
1	(Japan) Shingo Kunieda	7	7^{7}
(France) Nicolas Peifer	5	6^{5}
(Argentina) Gustavo Fernández	7^{7}	6
2	(France) Stéphane Houdet	6^{1}	1

Finals
1	(Japan) Shingo Kunieda	7^{7}	6
(Argentina) Gustavo Fernández	6^{0}	4
