= 2014 US Open – Wheelchair quad doubles =

Wheelchair quad doubles
- 2014 US Open

Final
- Champion: (United States) Nick Taylor (United States) David Wagner
- Runner-up: (United Kingdom) Andrew Lapthorne (South Africa) Lucas Sithole
- Score: 6–3, 7–5

Events
Singles	men	women		boys	girls
Doubles	men	women	mixed	boys	girls
WC Singles	men	women	quad
WC Doubles	men	women	quad
Legends	men	women	mixed
← 2013 ·	US Open	· 2015 →

Five-time defending champions Nick Taylor and David Wagner defeated Andrew Lapthorne and Lucas Sithole in the final, 6–3, 7–5 to win the quad doubles wheelchair tennis title at the 2014 US Open.

== Draw ==
=== Key ===
- Q = Qualifier
- WC = Wild card
- LL = Lucky loser
- Alt = Alternate
- SE = Special exempt
- PR = Protected ranking
- ITF = ITF entry
- JE = Junior exempt
- w/o = Walkover
- r = Retired
- d = Defaulted
- SR = Special ranking

=== Final ===
Final
(United States) Nick Taylor (United States) David Wagner	6	7
(United Kingdom) Andrew Lapthorne (South Africa) Lucas Sithole	3	5
