= 2014 US Open – Men's doubles =

Men's doubles
- 2014 US Open

Final
- Champions: (United States) Bob Bryan (United States) Mike Bryan
- Runners-up: (Spain) Marcel Granollers (Spain) Marc López
- Score: 6–3, 6–4

Details
- Draw: 64
- Seeds: 16

Events
Singles	men	women		boys	girls
Doubles	men	women	mixed	boys	girls
WC Singles	men	women	quad
WC Doubles	men	women	quad
Legends	men	women	mixed
← 2013 ·	US Open	· 2015 →

Leander Paes and Radek Štěpánek were the defending champions, but lost in the third round to Marcel Granollers and Marc López.

Bob and Mike Bryan won the title, defeating Granollers and López in the final, 6–3, 6–4. This marked several milestones for the American twins:

- It was their 100th ATP World Tour title as a team.
- This was their fifth US Open title, taking them past Bob Lutz and Stan Smith for the most in the Open Era, and drawing them level with 1880s players Richard Sears and James Dwight for the most overall.
- They also extended their own records for most Grand Slam titles (16) and most consecutive seasons with at least one Grand Slam title (10).

== Seeds ==
1. (United States) Bob Bryan / (United States) Mike Bryan (champions)
2. (Austria) Alexander Peya / (Brazil) Bruno Soares (quarterfinals)
3. (Canada) Daniel Nestor / (Serbia) Nenad Zimonjić (third round)
4. (Croatia) Ivan Dodig / (Brazil) Marcelo Melo (semifinals)
5. (France) Julien Benneteau / (France) Édouard Roger-Vasselin (first round)
6. (India) Leander Paes / (Czech Republic) Radek Štěpánek (third round)
7. (Spain) David Marrero / (Spain) Fernando Verdasco (quarterfinals)
8. (Canada) Vasek Pospisil / (United States) Jack Sock (third round)
9. (Netherlands) Jean-Julien Rojer / (Romania) Horia Tecău (third round)
10. (France) Michaël Llodra / (France) Nicolas Mahut (second round, withdrew)
11. (Spain) Marcel Granollers / (Spain) Marc López (final)
12. (United States) Eric Butorac / (South Africa) Raven Klaasen (quarterfinals)
13. (India) Rohan Bopanna / (Pakistan) Aisam-ul-Haq Qureshi (first round)
14. (Philippines) Treat Huey / (United Kingdom) Dominic Inglot (first round)
15. (United Kingdom) Jamie Murray / (Australia) John Peers (first round)
16. (Colombia) Juan Sebastián Cabal / (Colombia) Robert Farah (second round)

== Draw ==
=== Key ===
- Q = Qualifier
- WC = Wild card
- LL = Lucky loser
- Alt = Alternate
- SE = Special exempt
- PR = Protected ranking
- ITF = ITF entry
- JE = Junior exempt
- w/o = Walkover
- r = Retired
- d = Defaulted
- SR = Special ranking

=== Finals ===
Quarterfinals
1	(United States) Bob Bryan (United States) Mike Bryan	6	4	6
7	(Spain) David Marrero (Spain) Fernando Verdasco	2	6	4
(United States) Scott Lipsky (United States) Rajeev Ram	6	7^{7}
12	(United States) Eric Butorac (South Africa) Raven Klaasen	3	6^{4}
(Argentina) Carlos Berlocq (Argentina) Leonardo Mayer	6	4	2
4	(Croatia) Ivan Dodig (Brazil) Marcelo Melo	3	6	6
11	(Spain) Marcel Granollers (Spain) Marc López	7^{7}	6
2	(Austria) Alexander Peya (Brazil) Bruno Soares	6^{3}	4

Semifinals
1	(United States) Bob Bryan (United States) Mike Bryan	6	4	6
(United States) Scott Lipsky (United States) Rajeev Ram	4	6	3
4	(Croatia) Ivan Dodig (Brazil) Marcelo Melo	4	4
11	(Spain) Marcel Granollers (Spain) Marc López	6	6

Final
1	(United States) Bob Bryan (United States) Mike Bryan	6	6
11	(Spain) Marcel Granollers (Spain) Marc López	3	4

=== Top half ===
==== Section 1 ====
First round
1	(United States) B Bryan (United States) M Bryan	6	6
(Belarus) M Mirnyi (Russia) M Youzhny	2	3
WC	(United States) J Donaldson (United States) M Russell	2	7^{8}	6
WC	(United States) S Kozlov (United States) N Rubin	6	6^{6}	4
(United States) A Krajicek (Australia) J-P Smith	6	5	4
WC	(United States) B Klahn (United States) T Smyczek	2	7	6
(Germany) B Becker (New Zealand) A Sitak	7^{7}	3	6
14	(Philippines) T Huey (United Kingdom) D Inglot	6^{2}	6	2
9	(Netherlands) J-J Rojer (Romania) H Tecău	6	6
(Netherlands) J Huta Galung (Australia) R Junaid	4	4
(Czech Republic) L Dlouhý (Slovakia) M Kližan	5	5
(Germany) J-L Struff (Austria) D Thiem	7	7
WC	(United States) C Buchanan (United States) T Sandgren	2	3
(Croatia) M Pavić (Brazil) A Sá	6	6
(United States) N Monroe (United States) D Young	4	4
7	(Spain) D Marrero (Spain) F Verdasco	6	6

Second round
1	(United States) B Bryan (United States) M Bryan	6	6
WC	(United States) J Donaldson (United States) M Russell	1	2
WC	(United States) B Klahn (United States) T Smyczek	4	7	6
(Germany) B Becker (New Zealand) A Sitak	6	5	3
9	(Netherlands) J-J Rojer (Romania) H Tecău	4	6	6
(Germany) J-L Struff (Austria) D Thiem	6	3	4
(Croatia) M Pavić (Brazil) A Sá	6^{4}	5
7	(Spain) D Marrero (Spain) F Verdasco	7^{7}	7

Third round
1	(United States) B Bryan (United States) M Bryan	6	7^{7}
WC	(United States) B Klahn (United States) T Smyczek	3	6^{5}
9	(Netherlands) J-J Rojer (Romania) H Tecău	3	2
7	(Spain) D Marrero (Spain) F Verdasco	6	6

Quarterfinals
1	(United States) B Bryan (United States) M Bryan	6	4	6
7	(Spain) D Marrero (Spain) F Verdasco	2	6	4

==== Section 2 ====
First round
3	(Canada) D Nestor (Serbia) N Zimonjić	6	6
PR	(United Kingdom) C Fleming (United Kingdom) R Hutchins	4	3
(Colombia) N Barrientos (Colombia) S Giraldo	6	7^{7}
(Kazakhstan) A Golubev (Uzbekistan) D Istomin	4	6^{3}
WC	(United States) M Mmoh (United States) F Tiafoe	6	6
(Dominican Republic) V Estrella Burgos (Russia) T Gabashvili	3	4
(United States) S Lipsky (United States) R Ram	4	7^{8}	7^{7}
15	(United Kingdom) J Murray (Australia) J Peers	6	6^{6}	6^{4}
12	(United States) E Butorac (South Africa) R Klaasen	6	6
(Poland) T Bednarek (Sweden) J Brunström	3	1
(Argentina) F Delbonis (Colombia) A Falla	3	4
(Sweden) R Lindstedt (Austria) J Melzer	6	6
(Germany) M Emmrich (Czech Republic) L Rosol	6^{4}	6	7^{7}
(Mexico) S González (Austria) O Marach	7^{7}	2	6^{4}
(Spain) G García-López (Austria) P Oswald	4	7^{9}	7^{8}
5	(France) J Benneteau (France) É Roger-Vasselin	6	6^{7}	6^{6}

Second round
3	(Canada) D Nestor (Serbia) N Zimonjić	6	6
(Colombia) N Barrientos (Colombia) S Giraldo	2	2
WC	(United States) M Mmoh (United States) F Tiafoe	1	4
(United States) S Lipsky (United States) R Ram	6	6
12	(United States) E Butorac (South Africa) R Klaasen	6^{5}	6	1
(Sweden) R Lindstedt (Austria) J Melzer	7^{7}	2	0^{r}
(Germany) M Emmrich (Czech Republic) L Rosol	2	4
(Spain) G García-López (Austria) P Oswald	6	6

Third round
3	(Canada) D Nestor (Serbia) N Zimonjić	3	4
(United States) S Lipsky (United States) R Ram	6	6
12	(United States) E Butorac (South Africa) R Klaasen	4	6	6
(Spain) G García-López (Austria) P Oswald	6	3	4

Quarterfinals
(United States) S Lipsky (United States) R Ram	6	7^{7}
12	(United States) E Butorac (South Africa) R Klaasen	3	6^{4}

=== Bottom half ===
==== Section 3 ====
First round
8	(Canada) V Pospisil (United States) J Sock	6	6
(Finland) H Kontinen (Finland) J Nieminen	4	4
PR	(Czech Republic) F Čermák (Czech Republic) J Levinský	6	4	0
(Croatia) M Draganja (Romania) F Mergea	2	6	6
(Uruguay) P Cuevas (Argentina) H Zeballos	4	4
(Argentina) C Berlocq (Argentina) L Mayer	6	6
WC	(United States) P Kobelt (United States) H Reese	4	1
10	(France) M Llodra (France) N Mahut	6	6
16	(Colombia) JS Cabal (Colombia) R Farah	7^{11}	6
(Spain) P Andújar (Spain) P Carreño Busta	6^{9}	3
(Germany) A Begemann (Austria) J Knowle	3	4
(Poland) M Fyrstenberg (Poland) M Matkowski	6	6
(Serbia) D Lajović (Portugal) J Sousa	6	7
WC	(United States) M Giron (United States) K King	4	5
(United States) S Johnson (United States) S Querrey	5	6	6^{5}
4	(Croatia) I Dodig (Brazil) M Melo	7	4	7^{7}

Second round
8	(Canada) V Pospisil (United States) J Sock	6	6
(Croatia) M Draganja (Romania) F Mergea	4	2
(Argentina) C Berlocq (Argentina) L Mayer	w/o
10	(France) M Llodra (France) N Mahut
16	(Colombia) JS Cabal (Colombia) R Farah	6	4	4
(Poland) M Fyrstenberg (Poland) M Matkowski	4	6	6
(Serbia) D Lajović (Portugal) J Sousa	6^{1}	5
4	(Croatia) I Dodig (Brazil) M Melo	7^{7}	7

Third round
8	(Canada) V Pospisil (United States) J Sock	2	2
(Argentina) C Berlocq (Argentina) L Mayer	6	6
(Poland) M Fyrstenberg (Poland) M Matkowski	4	4
4	(Croatia) I Dodig (Brazil) M Melo	6	6

Quarterfinals
(Argentina) C Berlocq (Argentina) L Mayer	6	4	2
4	(Croatia) I Dodig (Brazil) M Melo	3	6	6

==== Section 4 ====
First round
6	(India) L Paes (Czech Republic) R Štěpánek	7^{7}	6
(Italy) S Bolelli (Italy) F Fognini	6^{5}	2
(Chinese Taipei) Y-h Lu (Czech Republic) J Veselý	6^{1}	6	6
(Australia) M Ebden (Croatia) I Karlović	7^{7}	4	4
(Russia) M Elgin (Germany) P Marx	1	3
(Netherlands) R Haase (Netherlands) I Sijsling	6	6
(Australia) N Kyrgios (Australia) B Tomic	7^{7}	5	4
11	(Spain) M Granollers (Spain) M López	6^{5}	7	6
13	(India) R Bopanna (Pakistan) A-u-H Qureshi	6^{10}	6	6^{5}
(Italy) D Bracciali (Italy) A Seppi	7^{12}	4	7^{7}
(Kazakhstan) M Kukushkin (New Zealand) M Venus	6	3
(Spain) F López (Argentina) J Mónaco	2	0^{r}
(Australia) S Groth (Australia) C Guccione	6	3	7^{7}
(United Kingdom) J Marray (Luxembourg) G Müller	4	6	6^{5}
(Argentina) M González (Argentina) D Schwartzman	3	7	1
2	(Austria) A Peya (Brazil) B Soares	6	5	6

Second round
6	(India) L Paes (Czech Republic) R Štěpánek	7^{7}	6
(Chinese Taipei) Y-h Lu (Czech Republic) J Veselý	6^{3}	3
(Netherlands) R Haase (Netherlands) I Sijsling	4	5
11	(Spain) M Granollers (Spain) M López	6	7
(Italy) D Bracciali (Italy) A Seppi	2	4
(Kazakhstan) M Kukushkin (New Zealand) M Venus	6	6
(Australia) S Groth (Australia) C Guccione	6^{5}	4
2	(Austria) A Peya (Brazil) B Soares	7^{7}	6

Third round
6	(India) L Paes (Czech Republic) R Štěpánek	2	6	1
11	(Spain) M Granollers (Spain) M López	6	4	6
(Kazakhstan) M Kukushkin (New Zealand) M Venus	3	4
2	(Austria) A Peya (Brazil) B Soares	6	6

Quarterfinals
11	(Spain) M Granollers (Spain) M López	7^{7}	6
2	(Austria) A Peya (Brazil) B Soares	6^{3}	4
