= 2015 US Open – Day-by-day summaries =

== Day 1 (August 31) ==
- Seeds out:
  - Men's Singles: (Japan) Kei Nishikori [4], (France) Gaël Monfils [16]
  - Women's Singles: (Serbia) Ana Ivanovic [7], (Czech Republic) Karolína Plíšková [8], (Spain) Carla Suárez Navarro [10], (Serbia) Jelena Janković [21], (United States) Sloane Stephens [29], (Russia) Svetlana Kuznetsova [30]
- Schedule of Play

Matches on main courts
Matches on Arthur Ashe Stadium
Event	Winner	Loser	Score
Women's Singles 1st Round	(Slovakia) Dominika Cibulková	(Serbia) Ana Ivanovic [7]	6–3, 3–6, 6–3
Women's Singles 1st Round	(United States) Venus Williams [23]	(Puerto Rico) Monica Puig	6–4, 6–7^{(7–9)}, 6–3
Men's Singles 1st Round	(Serbia) Novak Djokovic [1]	(Brazil) João Souza	6–1, 6–1, 6–1
2015 US Open Opening Ceremony
Women's Singles 1st Round	(United States) Serena Williams [1]	(Russia) Vitalia Diatchenko	6–0, 2–0, Retired
Men's Singles 1st Round	(Spain) Rafael Nadal [8]	(Croatia) Borna Ćorić	6–3, 6–2, 4–6, 6–4
Matches on Louis Armstrong Stadium
Event	Winner	Loser	Score
Men's Singles 1st Round	(France) Benoît Paire	(Japan) Kei Nishikori [4]	6–4, 3–6, 4–6, 7–6^{(8–6)}, 6–4
Men's Singles 1st Round	(Croatia) Marin Čilić [9]	(Argentina) Guido Pella [Q]	6–3, 7–6^{(7–3)}, 7–6^{(7–3)}
Women's Singles 1st Round	(United States) Coco Vandeweghe	(United States) Sloane Stephens [29]	6–4, 6–3
Men's Singles 1st Round (Note: This match was originally scheduled to play on Court 4 but was moved to Louis Armstrong Stadium following Maria Sharapova's withdrawal. The originally scheduled match was moved to Court 11.)	(Ukraine) Illya Marchenko [Q]	(France) Gaël Monfils [16]	2–6, 6–4, 5–0, Retired
Matches on Grandstand
Event	Winner	Loser	Score
Men's Singles 1st Round	(United States) Mardy Fish [PR]	(Italy) Marco Cecchinato	6–7^{(5–7)}, 6–3, 6–1, 6–3
Women's Singles 1st Round	(United States) Anna Tatishvili [Q]	(Czech Republic) Karolína Plíšková [8]	6–2, 6–1
Men's Singles 1st Round	(Spain) David Ferrer [7]	(Moldova) Radu Albot	4–6, 7–5, 6–1, 6–0
Women's Singles 1st Round	(United States) Madison Keys [19]	(Czech Republic) Klára Koukalová	6–2, 6–4
Colored background indicates a night match
Matches start at 11am, night session starts at 7pm Eastern Daylight Time (EDT)

== Day 2 (September 1) ==
- Seeds out:
  - Men's Singles: (France) Gilles Simon [11]
  - Women's Singles: (Czech Republic) Lucie Šafářová [6], (Switzerland) Timea Bacsinszky [14], (France) Alizé Cornet [27], (Romania) Irina-Camelia Begu [28]
- Schedule of Play

Matches on main courts
Matches on Arthur Ashe Stadium
Event	Winner	Loser	Score
Women's Singles 1st Round	(Romania) Simona Halep [2]	(New Zealand) Marina Erakovic	6–2, 3–0, Retired
Women's Singles 1st Round	(Denmark) Caroline Wozniacki [4]	(United States) Jamie Loeb [WC]	6–2, 6–0
Men's Singles 1st Round	(Switzerland) Roger Federer [2]	(Argentina) Leonardo Mayer	6–1, 6–2, 6–2
Men's Singles 1st Round	(United Kingdom) Andy Murray [3]	(Australia) Nick Kyrgios	7–5, 6–3, 4–6, 6–1
Women's Singles 1st Round	(Czech Republic) Petra Kvitová [5]	(Germany) Laura Siegemund [Q]	6–1, 6–1
Matches on Louis Armstrong Stadium
Event	Winner	Loser	Score
Women's Singles 1st Round	(Ukraine) Lesia Tsurenko	(Czech Republic) Lucie Šafářová [6]	6–4, 6–1
Men's Singles 1st Round	(United States) John Isner [13]	(Tunisia) Malek Jaziri	6–2, 6–3, 6–4
Women's Singles 1st Round	(Belarus) Victoria Azarenka [20]	(Czech Republic) Lucie Hradecká	6–1, 6–2
Men's Singles 1st Round	(Switzerland) Stan Wawrinka [5]	(Spain) Albert Ramos-Viñolas	7–5, 6–4, 7–6^{(8–6)}
Matches on Grandstand
Event	Winner	Loser	Score
Women's Singles 1st Round	(Germany) Angelique Kerber [11]	(Romania) Alexandra Dulgheru	6–3, 6–1
Men's Singles 1st Round	(Czech Republic) Tomáš Berdych [6]	(United States) Bjorn Fratangelo [WC]	6–3, 6–2, 6–4
Women's Singles 1st Round	(Germany) Andrea Petkovic [18]	(France) Caroline Garcia	3–6, 6–4, 7–5
Men's Singles 1st Round	(United States) Jack Sock [28]	(Dominican Republic) Víctor Estrella Burgos	6–2, 6–3, 6–2
Colored background indicates a night match
Matches start at 11am, night session starts at 7pm Eastern Daylight Time (EDT)

== Day 3 (September 2) ==
- Seeds out:
  - Men's Singles: (Bulgaria) Grigor Dimitrov [17]
  - Women's Singles: (Russia) Anastasia Pavlyuchenkova [31]
  - Men's Doubles: (United States) Bob Bryan / (United States) Mike Bryan [1], (Croatia) Ivan Dodig / (Brazil) Marcelo Melo [2], (Canada) Vasek Pospisil / (United States) Jack Sock [11]
- Schedule of Play

Matches on main courts
Matches on Arthur Ashe Stadium
Event	Winner	Loser	Score
Women's Singles 2nd Round	(United States) Madison Keys [19]	(Czech Republic) Tereza Smitková	6–1, 6–2
Men's Singles 2nd Round	(Croatia) Marin Čilić [9]	(Russia) Evgeny Donskoy [Q]	6–2, 6–3, 7–5
Women's Singles 2nd Round	(United States) Serena Williams [1]	(Netherlands) Kiki Bertens [Q]	7–6^{(7–5)}, 6–3
Women's Singles 2nd Round	(United States) Venus Williams [23]	(United States) Irina Falconi	6–3, 6–7^{(2–7)}, 6–2
Men's Singles 2nd Round	(Serbia) Novak Djokovic [1]	(Austria) Andreas Haider-Maurer	6–4, 6–1, 6–2
Matches on Louis Armstrong Stadium
Event	Winner	Loser	Score
Men's Singles 2nd Round	(Spain) Feliciano López [18]	(United States) Mardy Fish [PR]	2–6, 6–3, 1–6, 7–5, 6–3
Women's Singles 2nd Round	(United States) Bethanie Mattek-Sands [WC]	(United States) Coco Vandeweghe	6–2, 6–1
Men's Singles 2nd Round	(Spain) Rafael Nadal [8]	(Argentina) Diego Schwartzman	7–6^{(7–5)}, 6–3, 7–5
Men's Doubles 1st Round	(United States) Steve Johnson (United States) Sam Querrey	(United States) Bob Bryan [1] (United States) Mike Bryan [1]	7–6^{(7–4)}, 5–7, 6–3
Matches on Grandstand
Event	Winner	Loser	Score
Women's Singles 2nd Round	(United States) Madison Brengle	(United States) Anna Tatishvili [Q]	6–3, 6–2
Men's Singles 2nd Round	(Canada) Milos Raonic [10]	(Spain) Fernando Verdasco	6–2, 6–4, 6–7^{(5–7)}, 7–6^{(7–1)}
Women's Singles 2nd Round	(Canada) Eugenie Bouchard [25]	(Slovenia) Polona Hercog	6–3, 6–7^{(2–7)}, 6–3
Men's Singles 2nd Round	(France) Jo-Wilfried Tsonga [19]	(Spain) Marcel Granollers	6–3, 6–4, 6–3
Colored background indicates a night match
Matches start at 11am, night session starts at 7pm Eastern Daylight Time (EDT)

== Day 4 (September 3) ==
- Seeds out:
  - Men's Singles: (Croatia) Ivo Karlović [21], (United States) Jack Sock [28]
  - Women's Singles: (Denmark) Caroline Wozniacki [4], (Spain) Garbiñe Muguruza [9]
  - Men's Doubles: (Italy) Simone Bolelli / (Italy) Fabio Fognini [5], (Austria) Alexander Peya / (Brazil) Bruno Soares [10], (Uruguay) Pablo Cuevas / (Spain) David Marrero [13], (Spain) Feliciano López / (Belarus) Max Mirnyi [16]
  - Women's Doubles: (Germany) Julia Görges / (Poland) Klaudia Jans-Ignacik [16]
  - Mixed Doubles: (Czech Republic) Lucie Hradecká / (Poland) Marcin Matkowski [3]
- Schedule of Play

Matches on main courts
Matches on Arthur Ashe Stadium
Event	Winner	Loser	Score
Women's Singles 2nd Round	(Belarus) Victoria Azarenka [20]	(Belgium) Yanina Wickmayer	7–5, 6–4
Women's Singles 2nd Round	(Romania) Simona Halep [2]	(Ukraine) Kateryna Bondarenko [Q]	6–3, 6–4
Men's Singles 2nd Round	(United Kingdom) Andy Murray [3]	(France) Adrian Mannarino	5–7, 4–6, 6–1, 6–3, 6–1
Men's Singles 2nd Round	(Switzerland) Roger Federer [2]	(Belgium) Steve Darcis	6–1, 6–2, 6–1
Women's Singles 2nd Round	(Czech Republic) Petra Cetkovská [PR]	(Denmark) Caroline Wozniacki [4]	6–4, 5–7, 7–6^{(7–1)}
Matches on Louis Armstrong Stadium
Event	Winner	Loser	Score
Women's Singles 2nd Round	(Australia) Samantha Stosur [22]	(Russia) Evgeniya Rodina	6–1, 6–1
Men's Singles 2nd Round	(Switzerland) Stan Wawrinka [5]	(South Korea) Chung Hyeon	7–6^{(7–2)}, 7–6^{(7–4)}, 7–6^{(8–6)}
Men's Singles 2nd Round	(United States) John Isner [13]	(Russia) Mikhail Youzhny	6–3, 6–4, 6–4
Women's Singles 2nd Round	(Czech Republic) Petra Kvitová [5]	(United States) Nicole Gibbs [WC]	6–3, 6–4
Women's Singles 2nd Round	(Italy) Flavia Pennetta [26]	(Romania) Monica Niculescu	6–1, 6–4
Matches on Grandstand
Event	Winner	Loser	Score
Women's Singles 2nd Round	(Italy) Sara Errani [16]	(Latvia) Jeļena Ostapenko [Q]	0–6, 6–4, 6–3
Men's Singles 2nd Round	(Belgium) Ruben Bemelmans	(United States) Jack Sock [28]	4–6, 4–6, 6–3, 2–1, Retired
Women's Singles 2nd Round	(Germany) Sabine Lisicki [24]	(Italy) Camila Giorgi	6–4, 6–0
Men's Singles 2nd Round	(Australia) Bernard Tomic [24]	(Australia) Lleyton Hewitt [WC]	6–3, 6–2, 3–6, 5–7, 7–5
Colored background indicates a night match
Matches start at 11am, night session starts at 7pm Eastern Daylight Time (EDT)

== Day 5 (September 4) ==
- Seeds out:
  - Men's Singles: (Spain) David Ferrer [7], (Spain) Rafael Nadal [8], (Canada) Milos Raonic [10], (Belgium) David Goffin [14], (Italy) Andreas Seppi [25], (Spain) Tommy Robredo [26]
  - Women's Singles: (Switzerland) Belinda Bencic [12], (Poland) Agnieszka Radwańska [15], (Ukraine) Elina Svitolina [17]
  - Men's Doubles: (Colombia) Juan Sebastián Cabal / (Colombia) Robert Farah [14]
  - Women's Doubles: (Spain) Garbiñe Muguruza / (Spain) Carla Suárez Navarro [8], (Chinese Taipei) Hsieh Su-wei / (Australia) Anastasia Rodionova [10], (Spain) Anabel Medina Garrigues / (Spain) Arantxa Parra Santonja [14]
  - Mixed Doubles: (India) Sania Mirza / (Brazil) Bruno Soares [1]
- Schedule of Play

Matches on main courts
Matches on Arthur Ashe Stadium
Event	Winner	Loser	Score
Women's Singles 3rd Round	(Russia) Ekaterina Makarova [13]	(Ukraine) Elina Svitolina [17]	6–3, 7–5
Women's Singles 3rd Round	(United States) Venus Williams [23]	(Switzerland) Belinda Bencic [12]	6–3, 6–4
Men's Singles 3rd Round	(Serbia) Novak Djokovic [1]	(Italy) Andreas Seppi [25]	6–3, 7–5, 7–5
Women's Singles 3rd Round	(United States) Serena Williams [1]	(United States) Bethanie Mattek-Sands [WC]	3–6, 7–5, 6–0
Men's Singles 3rd Round	(Italy) Fabio Fognini [32]	(Spain) Rafael Nadal [8]	3–6, 4–6, 6–4, 6–3, 6–4
Matches on Louis Armstrong Stadium
Event	Winner	Loser	Score
Men's Singles 3rd Round	(Croatia) Marin Čilić [9]	(Kazakhstan) Mikhail Kukushkin	6–7^{(5–7)}, 7–6^{(7–1)}, 6–3, 6–7^{(3–7)}, 6–1
Women's Singles 3rd Round	(Canada) Eugenie Bouchard [25]	(Slovakia) Dominika Cibulková	7–6^{(11–9)}, 4–6, 6–3
Men's Singles 3rd Round	(France) Jérémy Chardy [27]	(Spain) David Ferrer [7]	7–6^{(8–6)}, 4–6, 6–3, 6–1
Matches on Grandstand
Event	Winner	Loser	Score
Women's Singles 3rd Round	(France) Kristina Mladenovic	(Russia) Daria Kasatkina [LL]	6–2, 6–3
Men's Singles 3rd Round	(France) Jo-Wilfried Tsonga [19]	(Ukraine) Sergiy Stakhovsky	6–3, 7–5, 6–2
Women's Singles 3rd Round	(Estonia) Anett Kontaveit [Q]	(United States) Madison Brengle	6–2, 3–6, 6–0
Men's Singles 3rd Round	(Spain) Feliciano López [18]	(Canada) Milos Raonic [10]	6–2, 7–6^{(7–4)}, 6–3
Women's Singles 3rd Round	(United States) Madison Keys [19]	(Poland) Agnieszka Radwańska [15]	6–3, 6–2
Colored background indicates a night match
Matches start at 11am, night session starts at 7pm Eastern Daylight Time (EDT)

== Day 6 (September 5) ==
- Seeds out:
  - Men's Singles: (Austria) Dominic Thiem [20], (Serbia) Viktor Troicki [22], (Australia) Bernard Tomic [24], (Germany) Philipp Kohlschreiber [29], (Brazil) Thomaz Bellucci [30], (Spain) Guillermo García-López [31]
  - Women's Singles: (Germany) Angelique Kerber [11], (Italy) Sara Errani [16], (Germany) Andrea Petkovic [18], (Slovakia) Anna Karolína Schmiedlová [32]
- Schedule of Play

Matches on main courts
Matches on Arthur Ashe Stadium
Event	Winner	Loser	Score
Women's Singles 3rd Round	(Czech Republic) Petra Kvitová [5]	(Slovakia) Anna Karolína Schmiedlová [32]	6–2, 6–1
Men's Singles 3rd Round	(Switzerland) Roger Federer [2]	(Germany) Philipp Kohlschreiber [29]	6–3, 6–4, 6–4
Women's Singles 3rd Round	(Belarus) Victoria Azarenka [20]	(Germany) Angelique Kerber [11]	7–5, 2–6, 6–4
Women's Singles 3rd Round	(Romania) Simona Halep [2]	(United States) Shelby Rogers [Q]	6–2, 6–3
Men's Singles 3rd Round	(United Kingdom) Andy Murray [3]	(Brazil) Thomaz Bellucci [30]	6–3, 6–2, 7–5
Matches on Louis Armstrong Stadium
Event	Winner	Loser	Score
Women's Singles 3rd Round	(United Kingdom) Johanna Konta [Q]	(Germany) Andrea Petkovic [18]	7−6^{(7−2)}, 6−3
Men's Singles 3rd Round	(United States) John Isner [13]	(Czech Republic) Jiří Veselý	6–3, 6–4, Retired
Women's Singles 3rd Round	(United States) Varvara Lepchenko	(Germany) Mona Barthel	1–6, 6–3, 6–4
Men's Singles 3rd Round	(Switzerland) Stan Wawrinka [5]	(Belgium) Ruben Bemelmans	6–3, 7–6^{(7–5)}, 6–4
Matches on Grandstand
Event	Winner	Loser	Score
Men's Singles 3rd Round	(France) Richard Gasquet [12]	(Australia) Bernard Tomic [24]	6−4, 6−3, 6−1
Women's Singles 3rd Round	(Australia) Samantha Stosur [22]	(Italy) Sara Errani [16]	7–5, 2–6, 6–1
Men's Singles 3rd Round	(United States) Donald Young	(Serbia) Viktor Troicki [22]	4–6, 0–6, 7–6^{(7–3)}, 6–2, 6–4
Women's Singles 3rd Round	(Germany) Sabine Lisicki [24]	(Czech Republic) Barbora Strýcová	6–4, 4–6, 7–5
Colored background indicates a night match
Matches start at 11am, night session starts at 7pm Eastern Daylight Time (EDT)

== Day 7 (September 6) ==
- Seeds out:
  - Men's Singles: (Spain) Roberto Bautista Agut [23], (France) Jérémy Chardy [27], (Italy) Fabio Fognini [32]
  - Women's Singles: (Russia) Ekaterina Makarova [13], (United States) Madison Keys [19], (Canada) Eugenie Bouchard [25] (withdrew due to concussion)
  - Men's Doubles: (Spain) Marcel Granollers / (Spain) Marc López [7]
  - Women's Doubles: (United States) Raquel Kops-Jones / (United States) Abigail Spears [6], (Czech Republic) Andrea Hlaváčková / (Czech Republic) Lucie Hradecká [7], (Netherlands) Michaëlla Krajicek / (Czech Republic) Barbora Strýcová [13]
  - Mixed Doubles: (United States) Raquel Kops-Jones / (South Africa) Raven Klaasen [7], (Germany) Julia Görges / (Serbia) Nenad Zimonjić [8]
- Schedule of Play

Matches on main courts
Matches on Arthur Ashe Stadium
Event	Winner	Loser	Score
Men's Singles 4th Round	(Croatia) Marin Čilić [9]	(France) Jérémy Chardy [27]	6–3, 2–6, 7–6^{(7–2)}, 6–1
Women's Singles 4th Round	(United States) Venus Williams [23]	(Estonia) Anett Kontaveit [Q]	6–2, 6–1
Women's Singles 4th Round	(United States) Serena Williams [1]	(United States) Madison Keys [19]	6–3, 6–3
Men's Singles 4th Round	(Serbia) Novak Djokovic [1]	(Spain) Roberto Bautista Agut [23]	6–3, 4–6, 6–4, 6–3
Women's Singles 4th Round	(France) Kristina Mladenovic	(Russia) Ekaterina Makarova [13]	7–6^{(7–2)}, 4–6, 6–1
Matches on Louis Armstrong Stadium
Event	Winner	Loser	Score
Men's Doubles 3rd Round	(United Kingdom) Dominic Inglot (Sweden) Robert Lindstedt	(Germany) Tommy Haas [PR] (Czech Republic) Radek Štěpánek [PR]	6–4, 6–3
Men's Singles 4th Round	(France) Jo-Wilfried Tsonga [19]	(France) Benoît Paire	6–4, 6–3, 6–4
Women's Doubles 3rd Round (Note: This match was originally scheduled to play on Court 13 but was moved to Louis Armstrong Stadium following Bouchard's withdrawal due to concussion.)	(Switzerland) Martina Hingis [1] (India) Sania Mirza [1]	(Netherlands) Michaëlla Krajicek [13] (Czech Republic) Barbora Strýcová [13]	6–3, 6–0
Men's Singles 4th Round	(Spain) Feliciano López [18]	(Italy) Fabio Fognini [32]	6–3, 7–6^{(7–5)}, 6–1
Matches on Grandstand
Event	Winner	Loser	Score
Women's Doubles 3rd Round	(Germany) Anna-Lena Grönefeld (United States) Coco Vandeweghe	(Czech Republic) Andrea Hlaváčková [7] (Czech Republic) Lucie Hradecká [7]	6–2, 6–4
Men's Doubles 3rd Round	(France) Pierre-Hugues Herbert [12] (France) Nicolas Mahut [12]	(Spain) Marcel Granollers [7] (Spain) Marc López [7]	6–2, 6–3
Mixed Doubles 2nd Round	(Czech Republic) Andrea Hlaváčková (Poland) Łukasz Kubot	(United States) Taylor Townsend [WC] (United States) Donald Young [WC]	6–7^{(3–7)}, 6–1, [10–5]
Men's Doubles 3rd Round	(United Kingdom) Jamie Murray [8] (Australia) John Peers [8]	(Austria) Philipp Oswald (Canada) Adil Shamasdin	6–4, 6–4
Mixed Doubles 2nd Round	(Australia) Anastasia Rodionova (Belarus) Max Mirnyi	(United States) Raquel Kops-Jones [7] (South Africa) Raven Klaasen [7]	6–4, 6–3
Colored background indicates a night match
Matches start at 11am, night session starts at 7pm Eastern Daylight Time (EDT)

== Day 8 (September 7) ==
- Seeds out:
  - Men's Singles: (United Kingdom) Andy Murray [3], (Czech Republic) Tomáš Berdych [6], (United States) John Isner [13]
  - Women's Singles: (Australia) Samantha Stosur [22], (Germany) Sabine Lisicki [24]
  - Men's Doubles: (Canada) Daniel Nestor / (France) Édouard Roger-Vasselin [9], (South Africa) Raven Klaasen [15] / (United States) Rajeev Ram [15]
  - Women's Doubles: (France) Kristina Mladenovic / (Hungary) Tímea Babos [3], (Italy) Karin Knapp / (Italy) Roberta Vinci [17]
- Schedule of Play

Matches on main courts
Matches on Arthur Ashe Stadium
Event	Winner	Loser	Score
Women's Singles 4th Round	(Belarus) Victoria Azarenka [20]	(United States) Varvara Lepchenko	6–3, 6–4
Men's Singles 4th Round	(Switzerland) Stan Wawrinka [5]	(United States) Donald Young	6–4, 1–6, 6–3, 6–4
Women's Singles 4th Round	(Italy) Flavia Pennetta [26]	(Australia) Samantha Stosur [22]	6–4, 6–4
Women's Singles 4th Round	(Czech Republic) Petra Kvitová [5]	(United Kingdom) Johanna Konta [Q]	7–5, 6–3
Men's Singles 4th Round	(Switzerland) Roger Federer [2]	(United States) John Isner [13]	7–6^{(7–0)}, 7–6^{(8–6)}, 7–5
Matches on Louis Armstrong Stadium
Event	Winner	Loser	Score
Men's Doubles 3rd Round	(India) Rohan Bopanna [6] (Romania) Florin Mergea [6]	(Canada) Daniel Nestor [9] (France) Édouard Roger-Vasselin [9]	6–7^{(4–7)}, 6–4, 6–3
Women's Singles 4th Round	(Romania) Simona Halep [2]	(Germany) Sabine Lisicki [24]	6–7^{(6–8)}, 7–5, 6–2
Men's Singles 4th Round	(South Africa) Kevin Anderson [15]	(United Kingdom) Andy Murray [3]	7–6^{(7–5)}, 6–3, 6–7^{(2–7)}, 7–6^{(7–0)}
Men's Singles 4th Round	(France) Richard Gasquet [12]	(Czech Republic) Tomáš Berdych [6]	2–6, 6–3, 6–4, 6–1
Matches on Grandstand
Event	Winner	Loser	Score
Women's Doubles 3rd Round	(Russia) Alla Kudryavtseva [12] (Russia) Anastasia Pavlyuchenkova [12]	(Italy) Karin Knapp [17] (Italy) Roberta Vinci [17]	7–6^{(7–2)}, 2–6, 6–2
Men's Doubles 3rd Round	(Netherlands) Jean-Julien Rojer [3] (Romania) Horia Tecău [3]	(United States) Eric Butorac (United States) Scott Lipsky	7–6^{(7–3)}, 7–5
Men's Doubles 3rd Round	(Poland) Marcin Matkowski [4] (Serbia) Nenad Zimonjić [4]	(South Africa) Raven Klaasen [15] (United States) Rajeev Ram [15]	6–3, 7–6^{(7–4)}
Mixed Doubles Quarterfinals	(Switzerland) Martina Hingis [4] (India) Leander Paes [4]	(Romania) Simona Halep (Romania) Horia Tecău	Walkover
Men's Doubles 3rd Round	(United States) Steve Johnson (United States) Sam Querrey	(United States) Michael Russell (United States) Donald Young	6–2, 6–4
Colored background indicates a night match
Matches start at 11am, night session starts at 7pm Eastern Daylight Time (EDT)

== Day 9 (September 8) ==
- Seeds out:
  - Men's Singles: (Spain) Feliciano López [18], (France) Jo-Wilfried Tsonga [19]
  - Women's Singles: (United States) Venus Williams [23]
  - Men's Doubles: (Netherlands) Jean-Julien Rojer / (Romania) Horia Tecău [3], (Serbia) Nenad Zimonjić / (Poland) Marcin Matkowski [4]
  - Women's Doubles: (Chinese Taipei) Chan Hao-ching / (Chinese Taipei) Chan Yung-jan [9], (Slovenia) Andreja Klepač / (Spain) Lara Arruabarrena [15]
  - Mixed Doubles: (Kazakhstan) Yaroslava Shvedova / (Colombia) Juan Sebastián Cabal [6]
- Schedule of Play

Matches on main courts
Matches on Arthur Ashe Stadium
Event	Winner	Loser	Score
Women's Singles Quarterfinals	(Italy) Roberta Vinci	(France) Kristina Mladenovic	6–3, 5–7, 6–4
Men's Singles Quarterfinals	(Croatia) Marin Čilić [9]	(France) Jo-Wilfried Tsonga [19]	6–4, 6–4, 3–6, 6–7^{(3–7)}, 6–4
Women's Singles Quarterfinals	(United States) Serena Williams [1]	(United States) Venus Williams [23]	6–2, 1–6, 6–3
Men's Singles Quarterfinals	(Serbia) Novak Djokovic [1]	(Spain) Feliciano López [18]	6–1, 3–6, 6–3, 7–6^{(7-2)}
Matches on Louis Armstrong Stadium
Event	Winner	Loser	Score
Mixed Doubles Quarterfinals	(Czech Republic) Andrea Hlaváčková (Poland) Łukasz Kubot	(Australia) Anastasia Rodionova (Belarus) Max Mirnyi	6–4, 6–4
Men's Doubles Quarterfinals	(France) Pierre-Hugues Herbert [12] (France) Nicolas Mahut [12]	(Netherlands) Jean-Julien Rojer [3] (Romania) Horia Tecău [3]	7–6^{(7–5)}, 6–4
Women's Doubles Quarterfinals	(Switzerland) Martina Hingis [1] (India) Sania Mirza [1]	(Chinese Taipei) Chan Hao-Ching [9] (Chinese Taipei) Chan Yung-Jan [9]	7–6^{(7–5)}, 6–1
Mixed Doubles Quarterfinals	(United States) Bethanie Mattek-Sands (United States) Sam Querrey	(Kazakhstan) Yaroslava Shvedova [6] (Colombia) Juan Sebastián Cabal [6]	3–6, 6–4, [10–6]
Matches on Grandstand
Event	Winner	Loser	Score
Women's Doubles Quarterfinals	(Italy) Sara Errani [11] (Italy) Flavia Pennetta [11]	(Slovakia) Andreja Klepač [15] (Spain) Lara Arruabarrena [15]	6–0, 5–7, 6–2
Men's Doubles Quarterfinals	(United Kingdom) Jamie Murray [8] (Australia) John Peers [8]	(Serbia) Nenad Zimonjić [4] (Poland) Marcin Matkowski [4]	3–6, 6–3, 7–6^{(7–4)}
Colored background indicates a night match
Matches start at 11am, night session starts at 7pm Eastern Daylight Time (EDT)

== Day 10 (September 9) ==
- Seeds out:
  - Men's Singles: (France) Richard Gasquet [12], (South Africa) Kevin Anderson [15]
  - Women's Singles: (Czech Republic) Petra Kvitová [5], (Belarus) Victoria Azarenka [20]
  - Men's Doubles: (India) Rohan Bopanna / (Romania) Florin Mergea [6]
  - Women's Doubles: (France) Caroline Garcia / (Slovenia) Katarina Srebotnik [5], (Italy) Sara Errani / (Italy) Flavia Pennetta [11], (Russia) Alla Kudryavtseva / (Russia) Anastasia Pavlyuchenkova [12]
  - Mixed Doubles: (Chinese Taipei) Chan Yung-jan / (India) Rohan Bopanna [2]
- Schedule of Play

Matches on main courts
Matches on Arthur Ashe Stadium
Event	Winner	Loser	Score
Women's Singles Quarterfinals	(Italy) Flavia Pennetta [26]	(Czech Republic) Petra Kvitová [5]	4–6, 6–4, 6–2
Women's Singles Quarterfinals	(Romania) Simona Halep [2]	(Belarus) Victoria Azarenka [20]	6–3, 4–6, 6–4
Men's Singles Quarterfinals	(Switzerland) Roger Federer [2]	(France) Richard Gasquet [12]	6–3, 6–3, 6–1
Exhibition Match	(United States) Jim Courier (United States) Mardy Fish	(United States) Michael Chang (United States) John McEnroe	3–6, 6–2, [10–8]
Matches on Louis Armstrong Stadium
Event	Winner	Loser	Score
Women's Doubles Quarterfinals	(Germany) Anna-Lena Grönefeld (United States) Coco Vandeweghe	(France) Caroline Garcia [5] (Slovenia) Katarina Srebotnik [5]	7–6^{(7–5)}, 7–5
Men's Doubles Quarterfinals	(United States) Steve Johnson (United States) Sam Querrey	(Argentina) Leonardo Mayer (Portugal) João Sousa	6–3, 6–4
Men's Singles Quarterfinals	(Switzerland) Stan Wawrinka [5]	(South Africa) Kevin Anderson [15]	6–4, 6–4, 6–0
Colored background indicates a night match
Matches start at 11am, night session starts at 7pm Eastern Daylight Time (EDT)

== Day 11 (September 10) ==
The women's semifinals match of Serena Williams vs. Roberta Vinci and Flavia Pennetta vs. Simona Halep were both scheduled on this date but cancelled due to rain, only one match was completed before the rain started.

- Schedule of Play

Matches on main courts
Matches on Louis Armstrong Stadium
Event	Winner	Loser	Score
Men's Doubles Semifinals	(France) Pierre-Hugues Herbert [12] (France) Nicolas Mahut [12]	(United Kingdom) Dominic Inglot (Sweden) Robert Lindstedt	7–5, 6–2
Colored background indicates a night match
Matches start at 12pm, night session is to start at 7pm Eastern Daylight Time (EDT)

== Day 12 (September 11) ==
- Seeds out:
  - Men's Singles: (Switzerland) Stan Wawrinka [5], (Croatia) Marin Čilić [9]
  - Women's Singles: (United States) Serena Williams [1], (Romania) Simona Halep [2]
- Schedule of Play

Matches on main courts
Matches on Arthur Ashe Stadium
Event	Winner	Loser	Score
Women's Singles Semifinals	(Italy) Flavia Pennetta [26]	(Romania) Simona Halep [2]	6–1, 6–3
Women's Singles Semifinals	(Italy) Roberta Vinci	(United States) Serena Williams [1]	2–6, 6–4, 6–4
Men's Singles Semifinals	(Serbia) Novak Djokovic [1]	(Croatia) Marin Čilić [9]	6–0, 6–1, 6–2
Men's Singles Semifinals	(Switzerland) Roger Federer [2]	(Switzerland) Stan Wawrinka [5]	6–4, 6–3, 6–1
Matches on Louis Armstrong Stadium
Event	Winner	Loser	Score
Women's Doubles Semifinals	(Australia) Casey Dellacqua [4] (Kazakhstan) Yaroslava Shvedova [4]	(Germany) Anna-Lena Grönefeld (United States) Coco Vandeweghe	6–7^{(3–7)}, 7–5, 7–5
Mixed Doubles Final	(Switzerland) Martina Hingis [4] (India) Leander Paes [4]	(United States) Bethanie Mattek-Sands (United States) Sam Querrey	6–4, 3–6, [10–7]
Matches start at 11am, night session starts at 5pm Eastern Daylight Time (EDT)

== Day 13 (September 12) ==
- Seeds out:
  - Men's Doubles: (United Kingdom) Jamie Murray / (Australia) John Peers [8]
- Schedule of Play

Matches on main courts
Matches on Arthur Ashe Stadium
Event	Winner	Loser	Score
Men's Doubles Final	(France) Pierre-Hugues Herbert [12] (France) Nicolas Mahut [12]	(United Kingdom) Jamie Murray [8] (Australia) John Peers [8]	6–4, 6–4
Women's Singles Final	(Italy) Flavia Pennetta [26]	(Italy) Roberta Vinci	7–6^{(7–4)}, 6–2
Matches start at 12pm Eastern Daylight Time (EDT)

== Day 14 (September 13) ==
- Seeds out:
  - Men's Singles: (Switzerland) Roger Federer [2]
  - Women's Doubles: (Australia) Casey Dellacqua / (Kazakhstan) Yaroslava Shvedova [4]
- Schedule of Play

Matches on main courts
Matches on Arthur Ashe Stadium
Event	Winner	Loser	Score
Women's Doubles Final	(Switzerland) Martina Hingis [1] (India) Sania Mirza [1]	(Australia) Casey Dellacqua [4] (Kazakhstan) Yaroslava Shvedova [4]	6–3, 6–3
Men's Singles Final	(Serbia) Novak Djokovic [1]	(Switzerland) Roger Federer [2]	6–4, 5–7, 6–4, 6–4
Matches start at 12pm Eastern Daylight Time (EDT)
