= 2012 US Open – Day-by-day summaries =

== Day 1 (August 27) ==
- Schedule of Play
- Seeds out:
  - Men's singles: (Germany) Florian Mayer [22]
  - Women's singles: (Germany) Sabine Lisicki [16], (Germany) Julia Görges [18], (Spain) Anabel Medina Garrigues [27]

Matches on main courts
Event	Winner	Loser	Score
Matches on Arthur Ashe Stadium
Women's singles 1st round	(Australia) Samantha Stosur [7]	(Croatia) Petra Martić	6–1, 6–1
Men's singles 1st round	(United Kingdom) Andy Murray [3]	(Russia) Alex Bogomolov, Jr.	6–2, 6–4, 6–1
Women's singles 1st round	(Russia) Maria Sharapova [3]	(Hungary) Melinda Czink	6–2, 6–2
2012 US Open Opening Night Ceremony
Women's singles 1st round	(Belgium) Kim Clijsters [23]	(United States) Victoria Duval [WC]	6–3, 6–1
Men's singles 1st round	(Switzerland) Roger Federer [1]	(United States) Donald Young	6–3, 6–2, 6–4
Matches on Louis Armstrong Stadium
Men's singles 1st round	(United States) James Blake [WC]	(Slovakia) Lukáš Lacko	7–5, 6–2, 3–6, 6–3
Women's singles 1st round	(Czech Republic) Lucie Šafářová [15]	(United States) Melanie Oudin [WC]	6–4, 6–0
Men's singles 1st round	(United States) Mardy Fish [23]	(Japan) Go Soeda	7–6^{(7–3)}, 7–6^{(7–2)}, 6–3
Women's singles 1st round	(Belarus) Victoria Azarenka [1]	(Russia) Alexandra Panova	6–0, 6–1
Matches on the Grandstand
Women's singles 1st round	(France) Marion Bartoli [11]	(United States) Jamie Hampton	6–3, 7–6^{(7–5)}
Men's singles 1st round	(United States) Jack Sock [WC]	(Germany) Florian Mayer [22]	6–3, 6–2, 3–2, retired
Women's singles 1st round	(Czech Republic) Petra Kvitová [5]	(Slovenia) Polona Hercog	7–6^{(8–6)}, 6–1
Men's singles 1st round	(France) Gilles Simon [16]	(United States) Michael Russell	7–6^{(7–4)}, 3–6, 5–7, 6–4, 6–1
Colored background indicates a night match

== Day 2 (August 28) ==
- Schedule of Play
- Seeds out:
  - Men's singles: (Argentina) Juan Mónaco [10]
  - Women's singles: (Denmark) Caroline Wozniacki [8], (United States) Christina McHale [21], (Italy) Francesca Schiavone [22], (Czech Republic) Klára Zakopalová [24], (Romania) Monica Niculescu [26], (Austria) Tamira Paszek [29], (China) Peng Shuai [32]
  - Men's doubles: (Belarus) Max Mirnyi / (Canada) Daniel Nestor [1], (Poland) Mariusz Fyrstenberg / (Poland) Marcin Matkowski [4], (France) Michaël Llodra / (Serbia) Nenad Zimonjić [7], (Spain) David Marrero / (Spain) Fernando Verdasco [13]

Matches on main courts
Event	Winner	Loser	Score
Matches on Arthur Ashe Stadium
Women's singles 1st round	(Poland) Agnieszka Radwańska [2]	(Russia) Nina Bratchikova	6–1, 6–1
Men's singles 1st round	(United States) Andy Roddick [20]	(United States) Rhyne Williams	6–3, 6–4, 6–4
Women's singles 1st round	(United States) Venus Williams	(United States) Bethanie Mattek-Sands [WC]	6–3, 6–1
Men's singles 1st round	(Serbia) Novak Djokovic [2]	(Italy) Paolo Lorenzi	6–1, 6–0, 6–1
Women's singles 1st round	(United States) Serena Williams [4]	(United States) Coco Vandeweghe	6–1, 6–1
Matches on Louis Armstrong Stadium
Men's singles 1st round	(Czech Republic) Tomáš Berdych [6]	(Belgium) David Goffin	7–5, 6–3, 6–3
Men's singles 1st round	(United States) Sam Querrey [27]	(Chinese Taipei) Lu Yen-hsun	6–7^{(4–7)}, 6–4, 6–4, 7–5
Women's singles 1st round	(United States) Sloane Stephens	(Italy) Francesca Schiavone [22]	6–3, 6–4
Women's singles 1st round	(Romania) Irina-Camelia Begu	(Denmark) Caroline Wozniacki [8]	6–2, 6–2
Matches on the Grandstand
Women's singles 1st round	(Serbia) Ana Ivanovic [12]	(Ukraine) Elina Svitolina	6–3, 6–2
Men's singles 1st round	(France) Jo-Wilfried Tsonga [5]	(Slovakia) Karol Beck	6–3, 6–1, 7–6^{(7–2)}
Men's singles 1st round	(Spain) Guillermo García-López	(Argentina) Juan Mónaco [10]	3–6, 1–6, 6–4, 7–6^{(8–6)}, 7–6^{(7–3)}
Women's singles 1st round	(Netherlands) Kiki Bertens	(United States) Christina McHale [21]	6–4, 4–6, 6–3
Colored background indicates a night match

== Day 3 (August 29) ==
- Schedule of Play
- Seeds out:
  - Men's singles: (Germany) Tommy Haas [21], (Italy) Andreas Seppi [26], (Russia) Mikhail Youzhny [28], (Serbia) Viktor Troicki [29]
  - Women's singles: (Russia) Anastasia Pavlyuchenkova [17], (Belgium) Kim Clijsters [23], (Belgium) Yanina Wickmayer [25]
  - Men's doubles: (India) Mahesh Bhupathi / (India) Rohan Bopanna [8]

Matches on main courts
Event	Winner	Loser	Score
Matches on Arthur Ashe Stadium
Women's singles 2nd round	(Belarus) Victoria Azarenka [1]	(Belgium) Kirsten Flipkens [Q]	6–2, 6–2
Men's singles 1st round	(United States) John Isner [9]	(Belgium) Xavier Malisse	6–3, 7–6^{(7–5)}, 5–7, 7–6^{(11–9)}
Women's singles 2nd round	(United Kingdom) Laura Robson	(Belgium) Kim Clijsters [23]	7–6^{(7–4)}, 7–6^{(7–5)}
Women's singles 2nd round	(Russia) Maria Sharapova [3]	(Spain) Lourdes Domínguez Lino	6–0, 6–1
Men's singles 2nd round	(United Kingdom) Andy Murray [3]	(Croatia) Ivan Dodig	6–2, 6–1, 6–3
Matches on Louis Armstrong Stadium
Men's singles 1st round	(Spain) David Ferrer [4]	(South Africa) Kevin Anderson	6–4, 6–2, 7–6^{(7–3)}
Women's singles 2nd round	(Czech Republic) Petra Kvitová [5]	(France) Alizé Cornet	6–4, 6–3
Men's singles 1st round	(Argentina) Juan Martín del Potro [7]	(France) Florent Serra [LL]	6–4, 7–6^{(7–4)}, 6–4
Women's singles 2nd round	(Australia) Samantha Stosur [7]	(Romania) Edina Gallovits-Hall [Q]	6–3, 6–0
Matches on the Grandstand
Men's singles 1st round	(Serbia) Janko Tipsarević [8]	(France) Guillaume Rufin [WC]	4–6, 3–6, 6–2, 6–3, 6–2
Women's singles 2nd round	(China) Li Na [9]	(Australia) Casey Dellacqua	6–4, 6–4
Women's doubles 1st round	(United States) Serena Williams [WC] (United States) Venus Williams [WC]	(United States) Lindsay Lee-Waters [Alt] (United States) Megan Moulton-Levy [Alt]	6–4, 6–0
Men's singles 1st round	(United States) Ryan Harrison	(Germany) Benjamin Becker	7–5, 6–4, 6–2
Colored background indicates a night match

== Day 4 (August 30) ==
- Schedule of Play
- Seeds out:
  - Men's singles: (France) Jo-Wilfried Tsonga [5], (Spain) Marcel Granollers [24]
  - Women's doubles: (Slovenia) Katarina Srebotnik / (China) Zheng Jie [7]
  - Mixed doubles: (Slovenia) Katarina Srebotnik / (Serbia) Nenad Zimonjić [5]

Matches on main courts
Event	Winner	Loser	Score
Matches on Arthur Ashe Stadium
Women's singles 2nd round	(Serbia) Ana Ivanovic [12]	(Sweden) Sofia Arvidsson	6–2, 6–2
Men's singles 2nd round	(United States) Mardy Fish [23]	(Russia) Nikolay Davydenko	4–6, 6–7^{(4–7)}, 6–2, 6–1, 6–2
Women's singles 2nd round	(United States) Serena Williams [4]	(Spain) María José Martínez Sánchez	6–2, 6–4
Men's singles 2nd round	(Switzerland) Roger Federer [1]	(Germany) Björn Phau	6–2, 6–3, 6–2
Women's singles 2nd round	(Germany) Angelique Kerber [6]	(United States) Venus Williams	6–2, 5–7, 7–5
Matches on Louis Armstrong Stadium
Women's singles 2nd round	(Russia) Maria Kirilenko [14]	(Hungary) Gréta Arn	6–3, 6–2
Men's singles 2nd round	(Slovakia) Martin Kližan	(France) Jo-Wilfried Tsonga [5]	6–4, 1–6, 6–1, 6–3
Women's singles 2nd round	(United States) Sloane Stephens	(Germany) Tatjana Malek [Q]	5–7, 6–4, 6–2
Men's singles 2nd round	(United States) James Blake [WC]	(Spain) Marcel Granollers [24]	6–1, 6–4, 6–2
Matches on the Grandstand
Men's singles 2nd round	(Spain) Nicolás Almagro [11]	(Germany) Philipp Petzschner	6–3, 5–7, 5–7, 6–4, 6–4
Women's singles 2nd round	(Poland) Agnieszka Radwańska [2]	(Spain) Carla Suárez Navarro	4–6, 6–3, 6–0
Men's singles 2nd round	(United States) Sam Querrey [27]	(Spain) Rubén Ramírez Hidalgo	6–3, 6–4, 6–3
Women's singles 2nd round	(Italy) Sara Errani [10]	(Russia) Vera Dushevina	6–0, 6–1
Colored background indicates a night match

== Day 5 (August 31) ==
- Schedule of Play
- Seeds out:
  - Women's singles: (China) Li Na [9], (Czech Republic) Lucie Šafářová [15], (China) Zheng Jie [28], (United States) Varvara Lepchenko [31]
  - Men's doubles: (United Kingdom) Jonathan Marray / (Denmark) Frederik Nielsen [11]
  - Women's doubles: (Czech Republic) Iveta Benešová / (Czech Republic) Barbora Záhlavová-Strýcová [10], (Australia) Anastasia Rodionova / (Kazakhstan) Galina Voskoboeva [12], (Poland) Klaudia Jans-Ignacik / (France) Kristina Mladenovic [15]
  - Mixed doubles: (United States) Lisa Raymond / (United States) Mike Bryan [2]

Matches on main courts
Event	Winner	Loser	Score
Matches on Arthur Ashe Stadium
Women's singles 3rd round	(Australia) Samantha Stosur [7]	(United States) Varvara Lepchenko [31]	7–6^{(7–5)}, 6–2
Men's singles 2nd round	(Serbia) Novak Djokovic [2]	(Brazil) Rogério Dutra Silva	6–2, 6–1, 6–2
Women's singles 3rd round	(Russia) Maria Sharapova [3]	(United States) Mallory Burdette [WC]	6–1, 6–1
Women's doubles 2nd round	(United States) Serena Williams [WC] (United States) Venus Williams [WC]	(Poland) Klaudia Jans-Ignacik [15] (France) Kristina Mladenovic [15]	6–4, 6–0
Men's singles 2nd round	(United States) Andy Roddick [20]	(Australia) Bernard Tomic	6–3, 6–4, 6–0
Women's singles 3rd round	(Belarus) Victoria Azarenka [1]	(China) Zheng Jie [28]	6–0, 6–1
Matches on Louis Armstrong Stadium
Women's singles 3rd round	(United Kingdom) Laura Robson	(China) Li Na [9]	6–4, 6–7^{(5–7)}, 6–2
Men's singles 2nd round	(Argentina) Juan Martín del Potro [7]	(United States) Ryan Harrison	6–2, 6–3, 2–6, 6–2
Men's singles 2nd round	(United States) John Isner [9]	(Finland) Jarkko Nieminen	6–3, 6–7^{(5–7)}, 6–4, 6–3
Matches on the Grandstand
Men's singles 2nd round	(Spain) David Ferrer [4]	(Netherlands) Igor Sijsling [Q]	6–2, 6–3, 7–6^{(14–12)}
Women's singles 3rd round	(Czech Republic) Petra Kvitová [5]	(France) Pauline Parmentier	6–4, 6–4
Women's singles 3rd round	(Russia) Nadia Petrova [19]	(Czech Republic) Lucie Šafářová [15]	6–4, 7–5
Men's singles 2nd round	(Serbia) Janko Tipsarević [8]	(United States) Brian Baker	6–4, 6–3, 6–4
Colored background indicates a night match

== Day 6 (September 1) ==
- Schedule of Play
- Seeds out:
  - Men's singles: (France) Gilles Simon [16], (Japan) Kei Nishikori [17], (Spain) Fernando Verdasco [25], (United States) Sam Querrey [27], (Spain) Feliciano López [30], (France) Jérémy Chardy [32]
  - Women's singles: (Slovakia) Dominika Cibulková [13], (Russia) Maria Kirilenko [14], (Serbia) Jelena Janković [30]
  - Men's doubles: (Austria) Jürgen Melzer / (Germany) Philipp Petzschner [10]

Matches on main courts
Event	Winner	Loser	Score
Matches on Arthur Ashe Stadium
Women's singles 3rd round	(Poland) Agnieszka Radwańska [2]	(Serbia) Jelena Janković [30]	6–3, 7–5
Women's singles 3rd round	(United States) Serena Williams [4]	(Russia) Ekaterina Makarova	6–4, 6–0
Men's singles 3rd round	(Switzerland) Roger Federer [1]	(Spain) Fernando Verdasco [25]	6–3, 6–4, 6–4
Women's singles 3rd round	(Serbia) Ana Ivanovic [12]	(United States) Sloane Stephens	6–7^{(4–7)}, 6–4, 6–2
Men's singles 3rd round	(United States) Mardy Fish [23]	(France) Gilles Simon [16]	6–1, 5–7, 7–6^{(7–5)}, 6–3
Matches on Louis Armstrong Stadium
Women's singles 3rd round	(Italy) Roberta Vinci [20]	(Slovakia) Dominika Cibulková [13]	6–2, 7–5
Men's singles 3rd round	(United Kingdom) Andy Murray [3]	(Spain) Feliciano López [30]	7–6^{(7–5)}, 7–6^{(7–5)}, 4–6, 7–6^{(7–4)}
Women's singles 3rd round	(Germany) Angelique Kerber [6]	(Belarus) Olga Govortsova	6–1, 6–2
Men's singles 3rd round	(Czech Republic) Tomáš Berdych [6]	(United States) Sam Querrey [27]	6–7^{(6–8)}, 6–4, 6–3, 6–2
Matches on the Grandstand
Men's singles 3rd round	(Spain) Nicolás Almagro [11]	(United States) Jack Sock [WC]	7–6^{(7–3)}, 6–7^{(4–7)}, 7–6^{(7–2)}, 6–1
Women's singles 3rd round	(Czech Republic) Andrea Hlaváčková	(Russia) Maria Kirilenko [14]	5–7, 6–4, 6–4
Men's singles 3rd round	(Canada) Milos Raonic [15]	(United States) James Blake [WC]	6–3, 6–0, 7–6^{(7–3)}
Colored background indicates a night match

== Day 7 (September 2) ==
- Schedule of Play
- Seeds out:
  - Men's singles: (United States) John Isner [9], (Ukraine) Alexandr Dolgopolov [14], (France) Julien Benneteau [31]
  - Women's singles: (Czech Republic) Petra Kvitová [5], (Russia) Nadia Petrova [19]
  - Men's doubles: (Sweden) Robert Lindstedt / (Romania) Horia Tecău [3], (United Kingdom) Colin Fleming / (United Kingdom) Ross Hutchins [14]
  - Women's doubles: (United States) Liezel Huber / (United States) Lisa Raymond [1], (United States) Bethanie Mattek-Sands / (India) Sania Mirza [13], (South Africa) Natalie Grandin / (Czech Republic) Vladimíra Uhlířová [14]
  - Mixed doubles: (Czech Republic) Andrea Hlaváčková / (India) Mahesh Bhupathi [6] (walkover), (Poland) Klaudia Jans-Ignacik / (Poland) Mariusz Fyrstenberg [8]

Matches on main courts
Event	Winner	Loser	Score
Matches on Arthur Ashe Stadium
Men's singles 3rd round	(Serbia) Novak Djokovic [2]	(France) Julien Benneteau [31]	6–3, 6–2, 6–2
Men's singles 3rd round	(United States) Andy Roddick [20]	(Italy) Fabio Fognini	7–5, 7–6^{(7–1)}, 4–6, 6–4
Women's singles 4th round	(Russia) Maria Sharapova [3]	(Russia) Nadia Petrova [19]	6–1, 4–6, 6–4
Men's singles 3rd round	(Germany) Philipp Kohlschreiber [19]	(United States) John Isner [9]	6–4, 3–6, 4–6, 6–3, 6–4
Matches on Louis Armstrong Stadium
Men's singles 3rd round	(Spain) David Ferrer [4]	(Australia) Lleyton Hewitt [WC]	7–6^{(11–9)}, 4–6, 6–3, 6–0
Men's singles 3rd round	(Switzerland) Stan Wawrinka [18]	(Ukraine) Alexandr Dolgopolov [14]	6–4, 6–4, 6–2
Women's singles 4th round	(Australia) Samantha Stosur [7]	(United Kingdom) Laura Robson	6–4, 6–4
Women's singles 4th round	(Belarus) Victoria Azarenka [1]	(Georgia (country)) Anna Tatishvili	6–2, 6–2
Matches on the Grandstand
Men's doubles 3rd round	(India) Leander Paes [5] (Czech Republic) Radek Štěpánek [5]	(United States) Jesse Levine (Australia) Marinko Matosevic	6–1, 6–3
Men's singles 3rd round	(Argentina) Juan Martín del Potro [7]	(Argentina) Leonardo Mayer	6–3, 7–5, 7–6^{(11–9)}
Men's singles 3rd round	(France) Richard Gasquet [13]	(United States) Steve Johnson [WC]	7–6^{(7–4)}, 6–2, 6–3
Women's singles 4th round	(France) Marion Bartoli [11]	(Czech Republic) Petra Kvitová [5]	1–6, 6–2, 6–0
Colored background indicates a night match

== Day 8 (September 3) ==
- Schedule of Play
- Seeds out:
  - Men's singles: (Spain) Nicolás Almagro [11], (Canada) Milos Raonic [15], (United States) Mardy Fish [23] (walkover)
  - Women's singles: (Poland) Agnieszka Radwańska [2], (Germany) Angelique Kerber [6]
  - Men's doubles: (Croatia) Ivan Dodig / (Brazil) Marcelo Melo [12], (Mexico) Santiago González / (United States) Scott Lipsky [16]
  - Women's doubles: (United States) Vania King / (Kazakhstan) Yaroslava Shvedova [5], (Russia) Ekaterina Makarova / (Russia) Elena Vesnina [6], (United States) Raquel Kops-Jones / (United States) Abigail Spears [9]
  - Mixed doubles: (Russia) Elena Vesnina / (India) Leander Paes [3]

Matches on main courts
Event	Winner	Loser	Score
Matches on Arthur Ashe Stadium
Women's singles 4th round	(Serbia) Ana Ivanovic [12]	(Bulgaria) Tsvetana Pironkova	6–0, 6–4
Women's singles 4th round	(United States) Serena Williams [4]	(Czech Republic) Andrea Hlaváčková	6–0, 6–0
Men's singles 4th round	(Switzerland) Roger Federer [1]	(United States) Mardy Fish [23]	Walkover
Men's singles 4th round	(Croatia) Marin Čilić [12]	(Slovakia) Martin Kližan	7–5, 6–4, 6–0
Men's singles 4th round	(United Kingdom) Andy Murray [3]	(Canada) Milos Raonic [15]	6–4, 6–4, 6–2
Matches on Louis Armstrong Stadium
Men's singles 4th round	(Czech Republic) Tomáš Berdych [6]	(Spain) Nicolás Almagro [11]	7–6^{(7–4)}, 6–4, 6–1
Women's singles 4th round	(Italy) Sara Errani [10]	(Germany) Angelique Kerber [6]	7–6^{(7–5)}, 6–3
Women's singles 4th round	(Italy) Roberta Vinci [20]	(Poland) Agnieszka Radwańska [2]	6–1, 6–4
Women's doubles 3rd round	(Russia) Maria Kirilenko [4] (Russia) Nadia Petrova [4]	(United States) Serena Williams [WC] (United States) Venus Williams [WC]	6–1, 6–4
Matches on the Grandstand
Women's doubles 3rd round	(Germany) Julia Görges [11] (Czech Republic) Květa Peschke [11]	(United States) Vania King [5] (Kazakhstan) Yaroslava Shvedova [5]	6–4, 6–2
Men's doubles 3rd round	(United States) Bob Bryan [2] (United States) Mike Bryan [2]	(Mexico) Santiago González [16] (United States) Scott Lipsky [16]	6–7^{(6–8)}, 7–6^{(7–5)}, 6–3
Mixed doubles quarterfinals	(Czech Republic) Květa Peschke [4] (Poland) Marcin Matkowski [4]	(India) Sania Mirza (United Kingdom) Colin Fleming	6–3, 7–5
Mixed doubles quarterfinals	(Czech Republic) Lucie Hradecká [7] (Czech Republic) František Čermák [7]	(Russia) Elena Vesnina [3] (India) Leander Paes [3]	7–6^{(7–2)}, 7–5
Colored background indicates a night match

== Day 9 (September 4) ==
- Schedule of Play
- Seeds out:
  - Men's singles: (France) Richard Gasquet [13]
  - Women's singles: (Australia) Samantha Stosur [7]
  - Men's doubles: (Austria) Alexander Peya / (Brazil) Bruno Soares [15]
  - Women's doubles: (Germany) Julia Görges / (Czech Republic) Květa Peschke [11]

Matches on main courts
Event	Winner	Loser	Score
Matches on Arthur Ashe Stadium
Women's singles quarterfinals	(Belarus) Victoria Azarenka [1]	(Australia) Samantha Stosur [7]	6–1, 4–6, 7–6^{(7–5)}
Women's singles quarterfinals	(Russia) Maria Sharapova [3] vs (France) Marion Bartoli [11]		0–4, suspended
Men's singles 4th round	(Argentina) Juan Martín del Potro [7] vs (United States) Andy Roddick [20]		6–6^{(0–1)}, suspended
Men's doubles quarterfinals	(France) Julien Benneteau / (France) Nicolas Mahut (United States) Bob Bryan / (United States) Mike Bryan [2]		Cancelled
Matches on Louis Armstrong Stadium
Men's singles 4th round	(Spain) David Ferrer [4]	(France) Richard Gasquet [13]	7–5, 7–6^{(7–2)}, 6–4
Men's singles 4th round	(Switzerland) Stan Wawrinka [18] vs (Serbia) Novak Djokovic [2]		0–2, suspended
Matches on Grandstand
Women's doubles quarterfinals	(Italy) Sara Errani [2] (Italy) Roberta Vinci [2]	(Germany) Julia Görges [11] (Czech Republic) Květa Peschke [11]	6–2, 7–6^{(7–2)}
Men's doubles quarterfinals	(Pakistan) Aisam-ul-Haq Qureshi / (Netherlands) Jean-Julien Rojer [9] (United States) Christian Harrison / (United States) Ryan Harrison [WC]		6–2, 2–2, suspended
Men's singles 4th round	(Serbia) Janko Tipsarević [8] vs (Germany) Philipp Kohlschreiber [18]		5–2, suspended
Colored background indicates a night match

== Day 10 (September 5) ==
- Schedule of Play
- Seeds out:
  - Men's singles: (Switzerland) Roger Federer [1], (Croatia) Marin Čilić [12], (Switzerland) Stan Wawrinka [18], (Germany) Philipp Kohlschreiber [19], (United States) Andy Roddick [20]
  - Women's singles: (France) Marion Bartoli [11], (Serbia) Ana Ivanovic [12], (Italy) Roberta Vinci [20]
  - Women's doubles: (Russia) Maria Kirilenko / (Russia) Nadia Petrova [4]
  - Mixed doubles: (United States) Liezel Huber / (Belarus) Max Mirnyi [1], (Czech Republic) Lucie Hradecká / (Czech Republic) František Čermák [7]

Matches on main courts
Event	Winner	Loser	Score
Matches on Arthur Ashe Stadium
Women's singles quarterfinals	(Russia) Maria Sharapova [3]	(France) Marion Bartoli [11]	3–6, 6–3, 6–4
Men's singles 4th round	(Argentina) Juan Martín del Potro [7]	(United States) Andy Roddick [20]	6–7^{(1–7)}, 7–6^{(7–4)}, 6–2, 6–4
Women's singles quarterfinals	(United States) Serena Williams [4]	(Serbia) Ana Ivanovic [12]	6–1, 6–3
Men's singles quarterfinals	(Czech Republic) Tomáš Berdych [6]	(Switzerland) Roger Federer [1]	7–6^{(7–1)}, 6–4, 3–6, 6–3
Matches on Louis Armstrong Stadium
Women's singles quarterfinals	(Italy) Sara Errani [10]	(Italy) Roberta Vinci [20]	6–2, 6–4
Men's singles 4th round	(Serbia) Novak Djokovic [2]	(Switzerland) Stan Wawrinka [18]	6–4, 6–1, 3–1, retired
Men's singles quarterfinals	(United Kingdom) Andy Murray [3]	(Croatia) Marin Čilić [12]	3–6, 7–6^{(7–4)}, 6–2, 6–0
Matches on Grandstand
Men's doubles quarterfinals	(Pakistan) Aisam-ul-Haq Qureshi [9] (Netherlands) Jean-Julien Rojer [9]	(United States) Christian Harrison [WC] (United States) Ryan Harrison [WC]	6–2, 6–3
Men's singles 4th round	(Serbia) Janko Tipsarević [8]	(Germany) Philipp Kohlschreiber [19]	6–3, 7–6 ^{(7–5)}, 6–2
Men's doubles quarterfinals	(United States) Bob Bryan [2] (United States) Mike Bryan [2]	(France) Julien Benneteau (France) Nicolas Mahut	7–6 ^{(7–2)}, 7–6 ^{(7–4)}
Colored background indicates a night match

== Day 11 (September 6) ==
- Schedule of Play
- Seeds out:
  - Men's singles: (Serbia) Janko Tipsarević [8], (Argentina) Juan Martín del Potro [7]
  - Men's doubles: (Spain) Marcel Granollers / (Spain) Marc López [6], (Pakistan) Aisam-ul-Haq Qureshi / (Netherlands) Jean-Julien Rojer [9]
  - Women's doubles: (Spain) Nuria Llagostera Vives / (Spain) María José Martínez Sánchez [8], (Chinese Taipei) Hsieh Su-wei / (Spain) Anabel Medina Garrigues [16]
  - Mixed doubles: (Czech Republic) Květa Peschke / (Poland) Marcin Matkowski [4]

Matches on main courts
Event	Winner	Loser	Score
Matches on Arthur Ashe Stadium
Mixed Doubles Finals	(Russia) Ekaterina Makarova (Brazil) Bruno Soares	(Czech Republic) Květa Peschke [4] (Poland) Marcin Matkowski [4]	6–7^{(8–10)}, 6–1, [12–10]
Men's singles quarterfinals	(Spain) David Ferrer [4]	(Serbia) Janko Tipsarević [8]	6–3, 6–7^{(5–7)}, 2–6, 6–3, 7–6^{(7–4)}
Exhibition doubles	(United States) John McEnroe (United States) Adam Sandler	(United States) Jim Courier (United States) Kevin James	3–1
Men's singles quarterfinals	(Serbia) Novak Djokovic [2]	(Argentina) Juan Martín del Potro [7]	6–2, 7–6^{(7–3)}, 6–4
Matches on Louis Armstrong Stadium
Women's doubles semifinals	(Italy) Sara Errani [2] (Italy) Roberta Vinci [2]	(Spain) Nuria Llagostera Vives [8] (Spain) María José Martínez Sánchez [8]	6–3, 6–2
Men's doubles semifinals	(India) Leander Paes [5] (Czech Republic) Radek Štěpánek [5]	(Spain) Marcel Granollers [6] (Spain) Marc López [6]	6–6, retired
Men's doubles semifinals	(United States) Bob Bryan [2] (United States) Mike Bryan [2]	(Pakistan) Aisam-ul-Haq Qureshi [9] (Netherlands) Jean-Julien Rojer [9]	6–3, 6–4
Women's doubles semifinals	(Czech Republic) Andrea Hlaváčková [3] (Czech Republic) Lucie Hradecká [3]	(Chinese Taipei) Hsieh Su-wei [16] (Spain) Anabel Medina Garrigues [16]	7–6^{(6–2)}, 6–4
Colored background indicates a night match

== Day 12 (September 7) ==
- Schedule of Play
- Seeds out:
  - Women's singles: (Russia) Maria Sharapova [3], (Italy) Sara Errani [10]
  - Men's doubles: (India) Leander Paes [5] / (Czech Republic) Radek Štěpánek [5]

Matches on main courts
Event	Winner	Loser	Score
Matches on Arthur Ashe Stadium
Men's doubles final	(United States) Bob Bryan [2] (United States) Mike Bryan [2]	(India) Leander Paes [5] (Czech Republic) Radek Štěpánek [5]	6–3, 6–4
Women's singles semifinals	(Belarus) Victoria Azarenka [1]	(Russia) Maria Sharapova [3]	3–6, 6–2, 6–4
Women's singles semifinals	(United States) Serena Williams [4]	(Italy) Sara Errani [10]	6–1, 6–2

== Day 13 (September 8) ==
Only one completed match was done before the inclement weather, the men's singles semifinal match between David Ferrer versus Novak Djokovic and the women's singles final of Victoria Azarenka versus Serena Williams were scheduled to compete as play has been postponed to Day 14.

- Schedule of Play
- Seeds out:
  - Men's singles: (Czech Republic) Tomáš Berdych [6]

Matches on main courts
Event	Winner	Loser	Score
Matches on Arthur Ashe Stadium
Men's singles semifinals	(United Kingdom) Andy Murray [3]	(Czech Republic) Tomáš Berdych [6]	5–7, 6–2, 6–1, 7–6^{(9–7)}
Men's singles semifinals	(Spain) David Ferrer [4] vs (Serbia) Novak Djokovic [2]		5–2, suspended
Women's singles final	(Belarus) Victoria Azarenka [1] vs (United States) Serena Williams [4]		Cancelled
Colored background indicates a night match

== Day 14 (September 9) ==
=== Women's singles final ===
The Women's single's final featured the then top ranked Victoria Azarenka against then three-time champion Serena Williams. Williams had beaten Azarenka in the 2012 Wimbledon semifinals and had won her first six matches in the US Open easily without dropping a set.

Williams won the first set 6-2. Azarenka came back with a break in the first game of the second set and won 2-6. In the final set with the set tied 3-3, Williams double-faulted and Azarenka took advantage and won the break. At 3-5, Azarkenka was two points from victory against Williams' serve, and then at 4-5 Azarenka was serving for the match. Azarenka then made three errors and lost the game to go to 5-5. Williams then won the final two games to win the title.

- Schedule of Play
- Seeds out:
  - Men's singles: (Spain) David Ferrer [4]
  - Women's singles: (Belarus) Victoria Azarenka [1]
  - Women's doubles: (Czech Republic) Andrea Hlaváčková [3] / (Czech Republic) Lucie Hradecká [3]

Matches on main courts
Event	Winner	Loser	Score
Matches on Arthur Ashe Stadium
Men's singles semifinals	(Serbia) Novak Djokovic [2]	(Spain) David Ferrer [4]	2–6, 6–1, 6–4, 6–2
Women's singles final	(United States) Serena Williams [4]	(Belarus) Victoria Azarenka [1]	6–2, 2–6, 7–5
Matches on Louis Armstrong Stadium
Women's doubles final	(Italy) Sara Errani [2] (Italy) Roberta Vinci [2]	(Czech Republic) Andrea Hlaváčková [3] (Czech Republic) Lucie Hradecká [3]	6–4, 6–2

== Day 15 (September 10) ==
=== Men's singles final ===
The final featured defending champion Novak Djokovic and Andy Murray. Murray won in 5 sets 7-6 (12-10) 7-5 2-6 3-6 6-2. The match was noted for having several long rallies, with the longest being 54 strokes. The match lasted 4 hours and 54 minutes which tied a record for a US Open final. A tiebreaker of 22 points in the first set also set a tournament record.

Murray became the first British male to win a Grand Slam singles title since Fred Perry in 1936.

- Schedule of Play
- Seeds out:
  - Men's singles: (Serbia) Novak Djokovic [2]

Match on Main Court
Event	Winner	Loser	Score
Match on Arthur Ashe Stadium
Men's singles final	(United Kingdom) Andy Murray [3]	(Serbia) Novak Djokovic [2]	7–6^{(12–10)}, 7–5, 2–6, 3–6, 6–2
