= 2014 US Open – Day-by-day summaries =

== Day 1 (August 25) ==
- Seeds out:
  - Men's Singles: (Russia) Mikhail Youzhny [21], (France) Julien Benneteau [24]
  - Women's Singles: (Spain) Garbiñe Muguruza [25]
- Schedule of Play – Day 1

Matches on main courts
Matches on Arthur Ashe Stadium
Event	Winner	Loser	Score
Women's Singles 1st Round	(Romania) Simona Halep [2]	(United States) Danielle Collins [WC]	6–7^{(2–7)}, 6–1, 6–2
Women's Singles 1st Round	(United States) Venus Williams [19]	(Japan) Kimiko Date-Krumm	2–6, 6–3, 6–3
Men's Singles 1st Round	(Switzerland) Stan Wawrinka [3]	(Czech Republic) Jiří Veselý	6–2, 7–6^{(8–6)}, 7–6^{(7–3)}
2014 US Open Opening Night Ceremony
Women's Singles 1st Round	(Russia) Maria Sharapova [5]	(Russia) Maria Kirilenko	6–4, 6–0
Men's Singles 1st Round	(Serbia) Novak Djokovic [1]	(Argentina) Diego Schwartzman	6–1, 6–2, 6–4
Matches on Louis Armstrong Stadium
Event	Winner	Loser	Score
Women's Singles 1st Round	(Poland) Agnieszka Radwańska [4]	(Canada) Sharon Fichman	6–1, 6–0
Men's Singles 1st Round	(United Kingdom) Andy Murray [8]	(Netherlands) Robin Haase	6–3, 7–6^{(8–6)}, 1–6, 7–5
Women's Singles 1st Round	(United States) Sloane Stephens [21]	(Germany) Annika Beck	6–0, 6–3
Men's Singles 1st Round	(Canada) Milos Raonic [5]	(Japan) Taro Daniel [Q]	6–3, 6–2, 7–6^{(7–1)}
Matches on Grandstand
Event	Winner	Loser	Score
Women's Singles 1st Round	(Germany) Angelique Kerber [6]	(Russia) Ksenia Pervak [Q]	6–2, 3–6, 7–5
Men's Singles 1st Round	(France) Jo-Wilfried Tsonga [9]	(Argentina) Juan Mónaco	6–3, 4–6, 7–6^{(7–2)}, 6–1
Men's Singles 1st Round	(Slovenia) Blaž Kavčič	(United States) Donald Young	7–5, 6–4, 6–4
Women's Singles 1st Round	(Denmark) Caroline Wozniacki [10]	(Slovakia) Magdaléna Rybáriková	6–1, 3–6, 2–0, ret.
Colored background indicates a night match
Matches start at 11am, night session starts at 7pm

== Day 2 (August 26) ==
- Seeds out:
  - Men's Singles: (Czech Republic) Lukáš Rosol [29]
  - Women's Singles: (Slovakia) Dominika Cibulková [12], (Russia) Svetlana Kuznetsova [20], (China) Zhang Shuai [32]
  - Men's Doubles: (India) Rohan Bopanna / (Pakistan) Aisam-ul-Haq Qureshi [13], (Philippines) Treat Huey / (United Kingdom) Dominic Inglot [14]
- Schedule of Play – Day 2

Matches on main courts
Matches on Arthur Ashe Stadium
Event	Winner	Loser	Score
Women's Singles 1st Round	(Serbia) Ana Ivanovic [8]	(United States) Alison Riske	6–3, 6–0
Men's Singles 1st Round	(United States) John Isner [13]	(United States) Marcos Giron [WC]	7–6^{(7–5)}, 6–2, 7–6^{(7–2)}
Women's Singles 1st Round	(Czech Republic) Petra Kvitová [3]	(France) Kristina Mladenovic	6–1, 6–0
Men's Singles 1st Round	(Switzerland) Roger Federer [2]	(Australia) Marinko Matosevic	6–3, 6–4, 7–6^{(7–4)}
Women's Singles 1st Round	(United States) Serena Williams [1]	(United States) Taylor Townsend [WC]	6–3, 6–1
Matches on Louis Armstrong Stadium
Event	Winner	Loser	Score
Men's Singles 1st Round	(United States) Sam Querrey	(Argentina) Máximo González	6–2, 4–6, 6–4, 4–6, 6–3
Women's Singles 1st Round	(Canada) Eugenie Bouchard [7]	(Belarus) Olga Govortsova	6–2, 6–1
Men's Singles 1st Round	(Spain) David Ferrer [4]	(Bosnia and Herzegovina) Damir Džumhur	6–1, 6–2, 2–6, 6–2
Women's Singles 1st Round	(United States) Madison Keys [27]	(Australia) Jarmila Gajdošová [WC]	6–0, 6–3
Matches on Grandstand
Event	Winner	Loser	Score
Women's Singles 1st Round	(Australia) Samantha Stosur [24]	(United States) Lauren Davis	6–1, 6–4
Men's Singles 1st Round	(Spain) Pablo Andújar	(United States) Jack Sock	6–4, 3–6, 6–1, ret.
Women's Singles 1st Round	(Belarus) Victoria Azarenka [16]	(Japan) Misaki Doi	6–7^{(3–7)}, 6–4, 6–1
Men's Singles 1st Round	(France) Gaël Monfils [20]	(United States) Jared Donaldson [WC]	6–4, 6–2, 6–4
Colored background indicates a night match
Matches start at 11am, night session starts at 7pm

== Day 3 (August 27) ==
- Seeds out:
  - Men's Singles: (Colombia) Santiago Giraldo [27], (France) Jérémy Chardy [30]
  - Women's Singles: (Poland) Agnieszka Radwańska [4], (United States) Sloane Stephens [21], (Japan) Kurumi Nara [31]
  - Men's Doubles: (France) Julien Benneteau / (France) Édouard Roger-Vasselin [5]
  - Women's Doubles: (United States) Raquel Kops-Jones / (United States) Abigail Spears [6], (Australia) Ashleigh Barty / (Australia) Casey Dellacqua [10], (Germany) Julia Görges / (Germany) Anna-Lena Grönefeld [16]
  - Mixed Doubles: (France) Kristina Mladenovic / (Canada) Daniel Nestor [4]
- Schedule of Play – Day 3

Matches on main courts
Matches on Arthur Ashe Stadium
Event	Winner	Loser	Score
Women's Singles 2nd Round	(Sweden) Johanna Larsson	(United States) Sloane Stephens [21]	5–7, 6–4, 6–2
Men's Singles 1st Round	(Czech Republic) Tomáš Berdych [6]	(Australia) Lleyton Hewitt	6–3, 6–4, 6–3
Women's Singles 2nd Round	(Russia) Maria Sharapova [5]	(Romania) Alexandra Dulgheru	4–6, 6–3, 6–2
Women's Singles 2nd Round	(United States) Venus Williams [19]	(Switzerland) Timea Bacsinszky	6–1, 6–4
Men's Singles 2nd Round	(Switzerland) Stan Wawrinka [3]	(Brazil) Thomaz Bellucci	6–3, 6–4, 3–6, 7–6^{(7–1)}
Matches on Louis Armstrong Stadium
Event	Winner	Loser	Score
Women's Singles 2nd Round	(China) Peng Shuai	(Poland) Agnieszka Radwańska [4]	6–3, 6–4
Men's Singles 1st Round	(Croatia) Marin Čilić [14]	(Cyprus) Marcos Baghdatis	6–3, 3–1, ret.
Women's Singles 2nd Round	(Romania) Simona Halep [2]	(Slovakia) Jana Čepelová	6–2, 6–1
Men's Singles 1st Round	(Bulgaria) Grigor Dimitrov [7]	(United States) Ryan Harrison [WC]	6–2, 7–6^{(7–4)}, 6–2
Men's Doubles 1st Round	(United States) Bob Bryan [1] (United States) Mike Bryan [1]	(Belarus) Max Mirnyi (Russia) Mikhail Youzhny	6–2, 6–3
Matches on Grandstand
Event	Winner	Loser	Score
Men's Singles 1st Round	(Spain) Feliciano López [19]	(Croatia) Ivan Dodig	1–6, 7–5, 2–6, 6–4, 1–1, ret.
Women's Singles 2nd Round	(Serbia) Jelena Janković [9]	(Bulgaria) Tsvetana Pironkova	7–5, 6–4
Women's Singles 2nd Round	(Denmark) Caroline Wozniacki [10]	(Belarus) Aliaksandra Sasnovich [Q]	6–3, 6–4
Men's Singles 1st Round	(Latvia) Ernests Gulbis [11]	(France) Kenny de Schepper	6–1, 6–4, 6–2
Colored background indicates a night match
Matches start at 11am, night session starts at 7pm

== Day 4 (August 28) ==
- Seeds out:
  - Men's Singles: (Spain) Guillermo García-López [28], (Spain) Fernando Verdasco [31]
  - Women's Singles: (Serbia) Ana Ivanovic [8], (Russia) Anastasia Pavlyuchenkova [23], (Australia) Samantha Stosur [24], (United States) Madison Keys [27]
  - Men's Doubles: (United Kingdom) Jamie Murray / (Australia) John Peers [15]
  - Women's Doubles: (Hungary) Tímea Babos / (France) Kristina Mladenovic [7]
  - Mixed Doubles: (Germany) Julia Görges / (Serbia) Nenad Zimonjić [7]
- Schedule of Play – Day 4

Matches on main courts
Matches on Arthur Ashe Stadium
Event	Winner	Loser	Score
Women's Singles 2nd Round	(Belarus) Victoria Azarenka [16]	(United States) Christina McHale	6–3, 6–2
Women's Singles 2nd Round	(United States) Serena Williams [1]	(United States) Vania King	6–1, 6–0
Men's Singles 2nd Round	(Serbia) Novak Djokovic [1]	(France) Paul-Henri Mathieu	6–1, 6–3, 6–0
Men's Singles 2nd Round	(United Kingdom) Andy Murray [8]	(Germany) Matthias Bachinger [Q]	6–3, 6–3, 6–4
Women's Singles 2nd Round	(Canada) Eugenie Bouchard [7]	(Romania) Sorana Cîrstea	6–2, 6–7^{(4–7)}, 6–4
Matches on Louis Armstrong Stadium
Event	Winner	Loser	Score
Women's Singles 2nd Round	(Czech Republic) Karolína Plíšková	(Serbia) Ana Ivanovic [8]	7–5, 6–4
Men's Singles 2nd Round	(United States) John Isner [13]	(Germany) Jan-Lennard Struff	7–6^{(7–5)}, 6–4, 6–2
Women's Singles 2nd Round	(Serbia) Aleksandra Krunić [Q]	(United States) Madison Keys [27]	7–6^{(7–4)}, 2–6, 7–5
Men's Singles 2nd Round	(Canada) Milos Raonic [5]	(Germany) Peter Gojowczyk [Q]	7–6^{(7–4)}, 5–7, 6–4, 7–6^{(7–3)}
Matches on Grandstand
Event	Winner	Loser	Score
Men's Singles 2nd Round	(Japan) Kei Nishikori [10]	(Spain) Pablo Andújar	6–4, 6–1, ret.
Men's Singles 2nd Round	(France) Jo-Wilfried Tsonga [9]	(Kazakhstan) Aleksandr Nedovyesov	6–3, 6–4, 6–4
Women's Singles 2nd Round	(Czech Republic) Petra Kvitová [3]	(Czech Republic) Petra Cetkovská	6–4, 6–2
Women's Doubles 1st Round	(United States) Serena Williams (United States) Venus Williams	(Hungary) Tímea Babos [7] (France) Kristina Mladenovic [7]	7–6^{(7–0)}, 6–7^{(4–7)}, 6–1
Colored background indicates a night match
Matches start at 11am, night session starts at 7pm

== Day 5 (August 29) ==
- Seeds out:
  - Men's Singles: (Latvia) Ernests Gulbis [11], (Italy) Fabio Fognini [15], (Croatia) Ivo Karlović [25], (Portugal) João Sousa [32]
  - Women's Singles: (Romania) Simona Halep [2], (Germany) Angelique Kerber [6], (Germany) Andrea Petkovic [18], (United States) Venus Williams [19], (France) Alizé Cornet [22], (Germany) Sabine Lisicki [26], (Italy) Roberta Vinci [28]
  - Men's Doubles: (Colombia) Juan Sebastián Cabal / (Colombia) Robert Farah [16]
  - Women's Doubles: (Chinese Taipei) Chan Hao-ching / (Chinese Taipei) Chan Yung-jan [14]
  - Mixed Doubles: (Czech Republic) Lucie Hradecká / (Romania) Horia Tecău [5], (United States) Raquel Kops-Jones / (Colombia) Juan Sebastián Cabal [8]
- Schedule of Play – Day 5

Matches on main courts
Matches on Arthur Ashe Stadium
Event	Winner	Loser	Score
Women's Singles 3rd Round	(Serbia) Jelena Janković [9]	(Sweden) Johanna Larsson	6–1, 6–0
Women's Singles 3rd Round	(Italy) Sara Errani [13]	(United States) Venus Williams [19]	6–0, 0–6, 7–6^{(7–5)}
Men's Singles 2nd Round	(Spain) David Ferrer [4]	(Australia) Bernard Tomic [WC]	walkover
Men's Singles 2nd Round	(Czech Republic) Tomáš Berdych [6]	(Slovakia) Martin Kližan	6–3, 4–6, 6–2, 3–6, 6–3
Men's Singles 2nd Round	(Switzerland) Roger Federer [2]	(Australia) Sam Groth	6–4, 6–4, 6–4
Women's Singles 3rd Round	(Russia) Maria Sharapova [5]	(Germany) Sabine Lisicki [26]	6–2, 6–4
Matches on Louis Armstrong Stadium
Event	Winner	Loser	Score
Women's Singles 3rd Round	(China) Peng Shuai	(Italy) Roberta Vinci [28]	6–4, 6–3
Men's Singles 2nd Round	(Bulgaria) Grigor Dimitrov [7]	(Israel) Dudi Sela	6–1, 6–2, 6–2
Women's Singles 3rd Round	(Czech Republic) Lucie Šafářová [14]	(France) Alizé Cornet [22]	6–3, 6–7^{(3–7)}, 6–4
Women's Doubles 2nd Round	(United States) Serena Williams (United States) Venus Williams	(Georgia (country)) Oksana Kalashnikova (Ukraine) Olga Savchuk	6–2, 6–1
Matches on Grandstand
Event	Winner	Loser	Score
Men's Singles 2nd Round	(France) Gaël Monfils [20]	(Colombia) Alejandro González	7–5, 6–3, 6–2
Women's Singles 3rd Round	(Croatia) Mirjana Lučić-Baroni [Q]	(Romania) Simona Halep [2]	7–6^{(8–6)}, 6–2
Mixed Doubles 1st Round	(United States) Taylor Townsend [WC] (United States) Donald Young [WC]	(United States) Jacqueline Cako [WC] (United States) Joel Kielbowicz [WC]	7–5, 6–3
Women's Singles 3rd Round	(Denmark) Caroline Wozniacki [10]	(Germany) Andrea Petkovic [18]	6–3, 6–2
Colored background indicates a night match
Matches start at 11am, night session starts at 7pm

== Day 6 (August 30) ==
- Seeds out:
  - Men's Singles: (United States) John Isner [13], (Argentina) Leonardo Mayer [23]
  - Women's Singles: (Czech Republic) Petra Kvitová [3], (Spain) Carla Suárez Navarro [15], (Czech Republic) Barbora Záhlavová-Strýcová [30]
  - Women's Doubles: (Italy) Sara Errani / (Italy) Roberta Vinci [1], (Spain) Anabel Medina Garrigues / (Kazakhstan) Yaroslava Shvedova [13], (Russia) Anastasia Pavlyuchenkova / (Czech Republic) Lucie Šafářová [15]
- Schedule of Play – Day 6

Matches on main courts
Matches on Arthur Ashe Stadium
Event	Winner	Loser	Score
Women's Singles 3rd Round	(Italy) Flavia Pennetta [11]	(United States) Nicole Gibbs [WC]	6–4, 6–0
Men's Singles 3rd Round	(Serbia) Novak Djokovic [1]	(United States) Sam Querrey	6–3, 6–2, 6–2
Women's Singles 3rd Round	(United States) Serena Williams [1]	(United States) Varvara Lepchenko	6–3, 6–3
Women's Singles 3rd Round	(Canada) Eugenie Bouchard [7]	(Czech Republic) Barbora Záhlavová-Strýcová [30]	6–2, 6–7^{(2–7)}, 6–4
Men's Singles 3rd Round	(Spain) Tommy Robredo [16]	(Australia) Nick Kyrgios	3–6, 6–3, 7–6^{(7–3)}, 6–3
Matches on Louis Armstrong Stadium
Event	Winner	Loser	Score
Women's Singles 3rd Round	(Serbia) Aleksandra Krunić [Q]	(Czech Republic) Petra Kvitová [3]	6–4, 6–4
Men's Singles 3rd Round	(United Kingdom) Andy Murray [8]	(Russia) Andrey Kuznetsov	6–1, 7–5, 4–6, 6–2
Men's Singles 3rd Round	(Germany) Philipp Kohlschreiber [22]	(United States) John Isner [13]	7–6^{(7–4)}, 4–6, 7–6^{(7–2)}, 7–6^{(7–4)}
Men's Singles 3rd Round	(Switzerland) Stan Wawrinka [3]	(Slovenia) Blaz Kavčič	walkover
Matches on Grandstand
Event	Winner	Loser	Score
Men's Singles 3rd Round	(Canada) Milos Raonic [5]	(Dominican Republic) Victor Estrella Burgos	7–6^{(7–5)}, 7–6^{(7–5)}, 7–6^{(7–3)}
Women's Singles 3rd Round	(Belarus) Victoria Azarenka [16]	(Russia) Elena Vesnina	6–1, 6–1
Men's Singles 3rd Round	(France) Jo-Wilfried Tsonga [9]	(Spain) Pablo Carreño Busta	6–4, 6–4, 6–4
Men's Doubles 2nd Round	(United States) Bob Bryan [1] (United States) Mike Bryan [1]	(United States) Jared Donaldson (United States) Michael Russell	6–1, 6–2
Colored background indicates a night match
Matches start at 11am, night session starts at 7pm

== Day 7 (August 31) ==
- Seeds out:
  - Men's Singles: (Spain) David Ferrer [4], (France) Richard Gasquet [12], (South Africa) Kevin Anderson [18], (Spain) Feliciano López [19]
  - Women's Singles: (Russia) Maria Sharapova [5], (Serbia) Jelena Janković [9], (Czech Republic) Lucie Šafářová [14]
  - Men's Doubles: (Canada) Daniel Nestor / (Serbia) Nenad Zimonjić [3], (France) Michaël Llodra / (France) Nicolas Mahut [10]
  - Women's Doubles: (Czech Republic) Lucie Hradecká / (Netherlands) Michaëlla Krajicek [11], (Spain) Garbiñe Muguruza / (Spain) Carla Suárez Navarro [12]
  - Mixed Doubles: (Czech Republic) Andrea Hlaváčková / (Austria) Alexander Peya [2]
- Schedule of Play – Day 7

Matches on main courts
Matches on Arthur Ashe Stadium
Event	Winner	Loser	Score
Women's Singles 4th Round	(Italy) Sara Errani [13]	(Croatia) Mirjana Lučić-Baroni [Q]	6–3, 2–6, 6–0
Women's Singles 4th Round	(Denmark) Caroline Wozniacki [10]	(Russia) Maria Sharapova [5]	6–4, 2–6, 6–2
Men's Singles 3rd Round	(Switzerland) Roger Federer [2]	(Spain) Marcel Granollers	4–6, 6–1, 6–1, 6–1
Women's Singles 4th Round	(Switzerland) Belinda Bencic	(Serbia) Jelena Janković [9]	7–6^{(8–6)}, 6–3
Matches on Louis Armstrong Stadium
Event	Winner	Loser	Score
Men's Singles 3rd Round	(France) Gilles Simon [26]	(Spain) David Ferrer [4]	6–3, 3–6, 6–1, 6–3
Women's Doubles 3rd Round	(United States) Serena Williams (United States) Venus Williams	(Spain) Garbiñe Muguruza [12] (Spain) Carla Suárez Navarro [12]	6–1, 6–0
Men's Singles 3rd Round	(Czech Republic) Tomáš Berdych [6]	(Russia) Teymuraz Gabashvili	6–3, 6–2, 6–4
Men's Singles 3rd Round	(France) Gaël Monfils [20]	(France) Richard Gasquet [12]	6–4, 6–2, 6–2
Matches on Grandstand
Event	Winner	Loser	Score
Mixed Doubles 2nd Round	(United States) Taylor Townsend [WC] (United States) Donald Young [WC]	(Czech Republic) Andrea Hlaváčková [2] (Austria) Alexander Peya [2]	6–3, 6–3
Men's Singles 3rd Round	(Croatia) Marin Čilić [14]	(South Africa) Kevin Anderson [18]	6–3, 3–6, 6–3, 6–4
Men's Singles 3rd Round	(Austria) Dominic Thiem	(Spain) Feliciano López [19]	6–4, 6–2, 6–3
Men's Singles 3rd Round	(Bulgaria) Grigor Dimitrov [7]	(Belgium) David Goffin	0–6, 6–3, 6–4, 6–1
Colored background indicates a night match
Matches start at 11am, night session starts at 7pm

== Day 8 (September 1) ==
- Seeds out:
  - Men's Singles: (Canada) Milos Raonic [5], (France) Jo-Wilfried Tsonga [9], (Spain) Tommy Robredo [16], (Germany) Philipp Kohlschreiber [22]
  - Women's Singles: (Canada) Eugenie Bouchard [7], (Australia) Casey Dellacqua [29]
  - Men's Doubles: (India) Leander Paes / (Czech Republic) Radek Štěpánek [6], (Canada) Vasek Pospisil / (United States) Jack Sock [8], (Netherlands) Jean-Julien Rojer / (Romania) Horia Tecău [9]
  - Women's Doubles: (Chinese Taipei) Hsieh Su-wei / (China) Peng Shuai [2], (Russia) Alla Kudryavtseva / (Australia) Anastasia Rodionova [9]
  - Mixed Doubles: (Zimbabwe) Cara Black / (India) Leander Paes [3], (Slovenia) Katarina Srebotnik / (India) Rohan Bopanna [6]
- Schedule of Play – Day 8

Matches on main courts
Matches on Arthur Ashe Stadium
Event	Winner	Loser	Score
Women's Singles 4th Round	(Italy) Flavia Pennetta [11]	(Australia) Casey Dellacqua [29]	7–5, 6–2
Women's Singles 4th Round	(United States) Serena Williams [1]	(Estonia) Kaia Kanepi	6–3, 6–3
Men's Singles 4th Round	(United Kingdom) Andy Murray [8]	(France) Jo-Wilfried Tsonga [9]	7–5, 7–5, 6–4
Women's Singles 4th Round	(Belarus) Victoria Azarenka [16]	(Serbia) Aleksandra Krunić [Q]	4–6, 6–4, 6–4
Men's Singles 4th Round	(Japan) Kei Nishikori [10]	(Canada) Milos Raonic [5]	4–6, 7–6^{(7–4)}, 6–7^{(6–8)}, 7–5, 6–4
Matches on Louis Armstrong Stadium
Event	Winner	Loser	Score
Men's Doubles 3rd Round	(United States) Bob Bryan [1] (United States) Mike Bryan [1]	(United States) Bradley Klahn [WC] (United States) Tim Smyczek [WC]	6–3, 7–6^{(7–5)}
Men's Singles 4th Round	(Serbia) Novak Djokovic [1]	(Germany) Philipp Kohlschreiber [22]	6–1, 7–5, 6–4
Women's Singles 4th Round	(Russia) Ekaterina Makarova [17]	(Canada) Eugenie Bouchard [7]	7–6^{(7–2)}, 6–4
Men's Singles 4th Round	(Switzerland) Stan Wawrinka [3]	(Spain) Tommy Robredo [16]	7–5, 4–6, 7–6^{(9–7)}, 6–2
Matches on Grandstand
Event	Winner	Loser	Score
Men's Doubles 3rd Round	(Argentina) Carlos Berlocq (Argentina) Leonardo Mayer	(Canada) Vasek Pospisil [8] (United States) Jack Sock [8]	6–2, 6–2
Men's Doubles 3rd Round	(Spain) Marcel Granollers [11] (Spain) Marc López [11]	(India) Leander Paes [6] (Czech Republic) Radek Štěpánek [6]	6–2, 4–6, 6–1
Women's Doubles 3rd Round	(Switzerland) Martina Hingis (Italy) Flavia Pennetta	(Australia) Jarmila Gajdošová (Australia) Ajla Tomljanović	6–1, 6–4
Mixed Doubles Quarterfinals	(United States) Abigail Spears (Mexico) Santiago González	(Zimbabwe) Cara Black [3] (India) Leander Paes [3]	6–4, 4–6, [10–8]
Colored background indicates a night match
Matches start at 11am, night session starts at 7pm

== Day 9 (September 2) ==
- Seeds out:
  - Men's Singles: (Bulgaria) Grigor Dimitrov [7], (Spain) Roberto Bautista Agut [17], (France) Gilles Simon [26]
  - Women's Singles: (Italy) Sara Errani [13]
  - Men's Doubles: (Spain) David Marrero / (Spain) Fernando Verdasco [7], (United States) Eric Butorac / (South Africa) Raven Klaasen [12]
  - Women's Doubles: (Czech Republic) Květa Peschke / (Slovenia) Katarina Srebotnik [5]
- Schedule of Play – Day 9

Matches on main courts
Matches on Arthur Ashe Stadium
Event	Winner	Loser	Score
Men's Doubles Quarterfinals	(United States) Scott Lipsky (United States) Rajeev Ram	(United States) Eric Butorac [12] (South Africa) Raven Klaasen [12]	6–3, 7–6^{(7–4)}
Women's Singles Quarterfinals	(China) Peng Shuai	(Switzerland) Belinda Bencic	6–2, 6–1
Men's Singles 4th Round	(France) Gaël Monfils [20]	(Bulgaria) Grigor Dimitrov [7]	7–5, 7–6^{(8–6)}, 7–5
Men's Singles 4th Round	(Switzerland) Roger Federer [2]	(Spain) Roberto Bautista Agut [17]	6–4, 6–3, 6–2
Women's Singles Quarterfinals	(Denmark) Caroline Wozniacki [10]	(Italy) Sara Errani [13]	6–0, 6–1
Matches on Louis Armstrong Stadium
Event	Winner	Loser	Score
Women's Doubles Quarterfinals	(Russia) Ekaterina Makarova [4] (Russia) Elena Vesnina [4]	(United States) Serena Williams (United States) Venus Williams	7–6^{(7–5)}, 6–4
Men's Singles 4th Round	(Croatia) Marin Čilić [14]	(France) Gilles Simon [26]	5–7, 7–6^{(7–3)}, 6–4, 3–6, 6–3
Men's Singles 4th Round	(Czech Republic) Tomáš Berdych [6]	(Austria) Dominic Thiem	6–1, 6–2, 6–4
Matches on Grandstand
Event	Winner	Loser	Score
Women's Doubles Quarterfinals	(Switzerland) Martina Hingis (Italy) Flavia Pennetta	(Czech Republic) Květa Peschke [5] (Slovenia) Katarina Srebotnik [5]	6–4, 6–3
Women's Doubles Quarterfinals	(Zimbabwe) Cara Black [3] (India) Sania Mirza [3]	(Kazakhstan) Zarina Diyas (China) Xu Yifan	6–1, 1–0, ret.
Men's Doubles Quarterfinals	(United States) Bob Bryan [1] (United States) Mike Bryan [1]	(Spain) David Marrero [7] (Spain) Fernando Verdasco [7]	6–4, 2–6, 6–4
Colored background indicates a night match
Matches start at 11am, night session starts at 7pm

== Day 10 (September 3) ==
- Seeds out:
  - Men's Singles: (Switzerland) Stan Wawrinka [3], (United Kingdom) Andy Murray [8]
  - Women's Singles: (Italy) Flavia Pennetta [11], (Belarus) Victoria Azarenka [16]
  - Men's Doubles: (Austria) Alexander Peya / (Brazil) Bruno Soares [2]
  - Women's Doubles: (Czech Republic) Andrea Hlaváčková / (China) Zheng Jie [8]
- Schedule of Play – Day 10

Matches on main courts
Matches on Arthur Ashe Stadium
Event	Winner	Loser	Score
Mixed Doubles Semifinals	(United States) Abigail Spears (Mexico) Santiago González	(United States) Taylor Townsend [WC] (United States) Donald Young [WC]	6–3, 6–4
Women's Singles Quarterfinals	(Russia) Ekaterina Makarova [17]	(Belarus) Victoria Azarenka [16]	6–4, 6–2
Men's Singles Quarterfinals	(Japan) Kei Nishikori [10]	(Switzerland) Stan Wawrinka [3]	3–6, 7–5, 7–6^{(9–7)}, 6–7^{(5–7)}, 6–4
Women's Singles Quarterfinals	(United States) Serena Williams [1]	(Italy) Flavia Pennetta [11]	6–3, 6–2
Men's Singles Quarterfinals	(Serbia) Novak Djokovic [1]	(United Kingdom) Andy Murray [8]	7–6^{(7–1)}, 6–7^{(1–7)}, 6–2, 6–4
Matches on Louis Armstrong Stadium
Event	Winner	Loser	Score
Men's Doubles Quarterfinals	(Spain) Marcel Granollers [11] (Spain) Marc López [11]	(Austria) Alexander Peya [2] (Brazil) Bruno Soares [2]	7–6^{(7–3)}, 6–4
Women's Doubles Quarterfinals	(Japan) Kimiko Date-Krumm (Czech Republic) Barbora Záhlavová-Strýcová	(Czech Republic) Andrea Hlaváčková [8] (China) Zheng Jie [8]	6–3, 4–6, 6–3
Men's Doubles Quarterfinals	(Croatia) Ivan Dodig [4] (Brazil) Marcelo Melo [4]	(Argentina) Carlos Berlocq (Argentina) Leonardo Mayer	3–6, 6–4, 6–2
Mixed Doubles Semifinals	(India) Sania Mirza [1] (Brazil) Bruno Soares [1]	(Chinese Taipei) Chan Yung-jan (United Kingdom) Ross Hutchins	7–5, 4–6, [10–7]
Colored background indicates a night match
Matches start at 11am, night session starts at 7pm

== Day 11 (September 4) ==
- Seeds out:
  - Men's Singles: (Czech Republic) Tomáš Berdych [6], (France) Gaël Monfils [20]
  - Men's Doubles: (Croatia) Ivan Dodig / (Brazil) Marcelo Melo [4]
  - Women's Doubles: (Zimbabwe) Cara Black / (India) Sania Mirza [3]
- Schedule of Play – Day 11

Matches on main courts
Matches on Arthur Ashe Stadium
Event	Winner	Loser	Score
Men's Doubles Semifinals	(United States) Bob Bryan [1] (United States) Mike Bryan [1]	(United States) Scott Lipsky (United States) Rajeev Ram	6–4, 4–6, 6–3
Men's Singles Quarterfinals	(Croatia) Marin Čilić [14]	(Czech Republic) Tomáš Berdych [6]	6–2, 6–4, 7–6^{(7–4)}
Exhibition Doubles	(United States) James Blake (United States) John McEnroe	(United States) Jim Courier (Sweden) Mats Wilander	4–1, 1–1
Men's Singles Quarterfinals	(Switzerland) Roger Federer [2]	(France) Gaël Monfils [20]	4–6, 3–6, 6–4, 7–5, 6–2
Matches on Louis Armstrong Stadium
Event	Winner	Loser	Score
Women's Doubles Semifinals	(Russia) Ekaterina Makarova [4] (Russia) Elena Vesnina [4]	(Japan) Kimiko Date-Krumm (Czech Republic) Barbora Záhlavová-Strýcová	7–5, 6–3
Men's Doubles Semifinals	(Spain) Marcel Granollers [11] (Spain) Marc López [11]	(Croatia) Ivan Dodig [4] (Brazil) Marcelo Melo [4]	6–4, 6–4
Women's Doubles Semifinals	(Switzerland) Martina Hingis (Italy) Flavia Pennetta	(Zimbabwe) Cara Black [3] (India) Sania Mirza [3]	6–2, 6–4
Colored background indicates a night match
Matches start at 11am (12pm on Arthur Ashe Stadium), night session starts at 7pm

== Day 12 (September 5) ==
- Seeds out:
  - Women's Singles: (Russia) Ekaterina Makarova [17]
- Schedule of Play – Day 12

Matches on main courts
Matches on Arthur Ashe Stadium
Event	Winner	Loser	Score
Mixed Doubles Final	(India) Sania Mirza [1] (Brazil) Bruno Soares [1]	(United States) Abigail Spears (Mexico) Santiago González	6–1, 2–6, [11–9]
Women's Singles Semifinals	(Denmark) Caroline Wozniacki [10]	(China) Peng Shuai	7–6^{(7–1)}, 4–3, ret.
Women's Singles Semifinals	(United States) Serena Williams [1]	(Russia) Ekaterina Makarova [17]	6–1, 6–3
Matches start at 12:30pm

== Day 13 (September 6) ==
- Seeds out:
  - Men's Singles: (Serbia) Novak Djokovic [1], (Switzerland) Roger Federer [2]
- Schedule of Play – Day 13

Matches on main courts
Matches on Arthur Ashe Stadium
Event	Winner	Loser	Score
Men's Singles Semifinals	(Japan) Kei Nishikori [10]	(Serbia) Novak Djokovic [1]	6–4, 1–6, 7–6^{(7–4)}, 6–3
Men's Singles Semifinals	(Croatia) Marin Čilić [14]	(Switzerland) Roger Federer [2]	6–3, 6–4, 6–4
Women's Doubles Final	(Russia) Ekaterina Makarova [4] (Russia) Elena Vesnina [4]	(Switzerland) Martina Hingis (Italy) Flavia Pennetta	2–6, 6–3, 6–2
Matches start at 12pm

== Day 14 (September 7) ==
- Seeds out:
  - Women's Singles: (Denmark) Caroline Wozniacki [10]
  - Men's Doubles: (Spain) Marcel Granollers / (Spain) Marc López [11]
- Schedule of Play – Day 14

Matches on main courts
Matches on Arthur Ashe Stadium
Event	Winner	Loser	Score
Men's Doubles Final	(United States) Bob Bryan [1] (United States) Mike Bryan [1]	(Spain) Marcel Granollers [11] (Spain) Marc López [11]	6–3, 6–4
Women's Singles Final	(United States) Serena Williams [1]	(Denmark) Caroline Wozniacki [10]	6–3, 6–3
Matches start at 12:30pm

== Day 15 (September 8) ==
- Seeds out:
  - Men's Singles: (Japan) Kei Nishikori [10]
- Schedule of Play – Day 15

Matches on main courts
Matches on Arthur Ashe Stadium
Event	Winner	Loser	Score	Duration
Men's Singles Final	(Croatia) Marin Čilić [14]	(Japan) Kei Nishikori [10]	6–3, 6–3, 6–3	1:54
Match starts at 5pm
