= 2013 US Open – Day-by-day summaries =

== Day 1 (August 26) ==
- Seeds out:
  - Men's singles: (Japan) Kei Nishikori [11], (Spain) Fernando Verdasco [27], (Latvia) Ernests Gulbis [30]
  - Women's singles: (Belgium) Kirsten Flipkens [12], (Slovakia) Magdaléna Rybáriková [29]
- Schedule

Matches on main courts
Matches on Arthur Ashe Stadium
Event	Winner	Loser	Score
Women's singles – 1st round	(Poland) Agnieszka Radwańska [3]	(Spain) Sílvia Soler Espinosa	6–1, 6–2
Women's singles – 1st round	(United States) Venus Williams	(Belgium) Kirsten Flipkens [12]	6–1, 6–2
Men's singles – 1st round	(Spain) Rafael Nadal [2]	(United States) Ryan Harrison [WC]	6–4, 6–2, 6–2
2013 US Open Opening Night Ceremony
Women's singles – 1st round	(United States) Serena Williams [1]	(Italy) Francesca Schiavone	6–0, 6–1
Men's singles – 1st round	(Switzerland) Roger Federer [7] vs. (Slovenia) Grega Žemlja		Cancelled (rain)
Matches on Louis Armstrong Stadium
Event	Winner	Loser	Score
Women's singles – 1st round	(China) Li Na [5]	(Belarus) Olga Govortsova	6–2, 6–2
Men's singles – 1st round	(France) Richard Gasquet [8]	(United States) Michael Russell	6–3, 6–4, 6–2
Women's singles – 1st round	(United States) Sloane Stephens [15]	(Luxembourg) Mandy Minella	6–4, 3–6, 7–6^{(7–5)}
Men's singles – 1st round	(Spain) David Ferrer [4]	(Australia) Nick Kyrgios [Q]	7–5, 6–3, 6–2
Matches on Grandstand
Event	Winner	Loser	Score
Men's singles – 1st round	(Australia) Bernard Tomic	(Spain) Albert Ramos	6–3, 3–6, 4–6, 7–6^{(7–1)}, 6–3
Men's singles – 1st round	(Croatia) Ivan Dodig	(Spain) Fernando Verdasco [27]	6–3, 7–5, 1–6, 4–6, 6–3
Women's singles – 1st round	(Serbia) Jelena Janković [9]	(United States) Madison Keys	6–3, 6–4
Colored background indicates a night match

== Day 2 (August 27) ==
- Seeds out:
  - Men's singles: (Poland) Jerzy Janowicz [14], (Spain) Nicolás Almagro [15], (Bulgaria) Grigor Dimitrov [25], (Argentina) Juan Mónaco [28]
  - Women's singles: (Australia) Samantha Stosur [11], (Slovakia) Dominika Cibulková [17], (Russia) Nadia Petrova [20], (Czech Republic) Klára Zakopalová [31]
- Schedule

Matches on main courts
Matches on Arthur Ashe Stadium
Event	Winner	Loser	Score
Women's singles – 1st round	(Czech Republic) Petra Kvitová [7]	(Japan) Misaki Doi	6–2, 3–6, 6–1
Women's singles – 1st round	(Denmark) Caroline Wozniacki [6]	(China) Duan Yingying [Q]	6–2, 7–5
Men's singles – 1st round	(Switzerland) Roger Federer [7]	(Slovenia) Grega Žemlja	6–3, 6–2, 7–5
Men's singles – 1st round	(Serbia) Novak Djokovic [1]	(Lithuania) Ričardas Berankis	6–1, 6–2, 6–2
Women's singles – 1st round	(Belarus) Victoria Azarenka [2]	(Germany) Dinah Pfizenmaier	6–0, 6–0
Matches on Louis Armstrong Stadium
Event	Winner	Loser	Score
Men's singles – 1st round	(Canada) Milos Raonic [10]	(Italy) Thomas Fabbiano [Q]	6–3, 7–6^{(7–5)}, 6–3
Men's singles – 1st round	(United States) Sam Querrey [26]	(Argentina) Guido Pella	7–6^{(7–3)}, 4–6, 6–1, 6–2
Women's singles – 1st round	(Italy) Sara Errani [4]	(Australia) Olivia Rogowska [LL]	6–0, 6–0
Women's singles – 1st round	(United States) Victoria Duval [Q]	(Australia) Samantha Stosur [11]	5–7, 6–4, 6–4
Matches on Grandstand
Event	Winner	Loser	Score
Women's singles – 1st round	(Serbia) Ana Ivanovic [13]	(Georgia (country)) Anna Tatishvili	6–2, 6–0
Women's singles – 1st round	(United States) Christina McHale	(Germany) Julia Görges	6–4, 6–3
Men's singles – 1st round	(United States) John Isner [13]	(Italy) Filippo Volandri	6–0, 6–2, 6–3
Men's singles – 1st round	(Czech Republic) Tomáš Berdych [5]	(Italy) Paolo Lorenzi	6–1, 6–4, 6–1
Men's singles – 1st round	(Germany) Tobias Kamke	(United States) Steve Johnson	6–7^{(4–7)}, 6–4, 7–6^{(9–7)}, 6–2
Colored background indicates a night match

== Day 3 (August 28) ==
- Seeds out:
  - Men's singles: (Italy) Fabio Fognini [16], (France) Benoît Paire [24], (Austria) Jürgen Melzer [29]
  - Men's doubles: (Belarus) Max Mirnyi / (Romania) Horia Tecău [13], (Czech Republic) František Čermák / (Slovakia) Filip Polášek [15]
- Schedule

Matches on main courts
Matches on Arthur Ashe Stadium
Event	Winner	Loser	Score
Women's singles – 2nd round	(China) Li Na [5]	(Sweden) Sofia Arvidsson	6–2, 6–2
Men's singles – 1st round	(Argentina) Juan Martín del Potro [5]	(Spain) Guillermo García López	6–3, 6–7^{(5–7)}, 6–4, 7–6^{(9–7)}
Women's singles – 2nd round	(United States) Serena Williams [1] vs. (Kazakhstan) Galina Voskoboeva		Cancelled
Men's singles – 1st round	(United Kingdom) Andy Murray [3]	(France) Michaël Llodra	6–2, 6–4, 6–3
Women's singles – 2nd round	(United States) Sloane Stephens [15]	(Poland) Urszula Radwańska	6–1, 6–1
Matches on Louis Armstrong Stadium
Event	Winner	Loser	Score
Women's singles – 2nd round	(Poland) Agnieszka Radwańska [3]	(Spain) María-Teresa Torró-Flor	6–0, 7–5
Women's singles – 2nd round	(China) Zheng Jie	(United States) Venus Williams	6–3, 2–6, 7–6^{(7–5)}
Men's singles – 1st round	(Croatia) Ivo Karlović [Q]	(United States) James Blake	6–7^{(2–7)}, 3–6, 6–4, 7–6^{(7–2)}, 7–6^{(7–2)}
Matches on Grandstand
Event	Winner	Loser	Score
Men's singles – 1st round	(South Africa) Kevin Anderson [17]	(Germany) Daniel Brands	7–5, 4–6, 6–2, 6–3
Men's singles – 1st round	(Australia) Lleyton Hewitt	(United States) Brian Baker [WC]	6–3, 4–6, 6–3, 6–4
Women's singles – 2nd round	(United States) Jamie Hampton [23]	(France) Kristina Mladenović	7–5, 6–4
Women's singles – 2nd round	(Canada) Eugenie Bouchard vs. (Germany) Angelique Kerber [8]		Cancelled
Colored background indicates a night match

== Day 4 (August 29) ==
- Seeds out:
  - Men's singles: (United States) Sam Querrey [26]
  - Women's singles: (Italy) Sara Errani [4], (Romania) Sorana Cîrstea [19], (Russia) Elena Vesnina [22], (Germany) Mona Barthel [28]
  - Men's doubles: (Poland) Mariusz Fyrstenberg / (Poland) Marcin Matkowski [8], (Spain) David Marrero / (Spain) Fernando Verdasco [9], (Mexico) Santiago González / (United States) Scott Lipsky [11]
- Schedule

Matches on main courts
Matches on Arthur Ashe Stadium
Event	Winner	Loser	Score
Women's singles – 2nd round	(Italy) Flavia Pennetta	(Italy) Sara Errani [4]	6–3, 6–1
Women's singles – 2nd round	(United States) Serena Williams [1]	(Kazakhstan) Galina Voskoboeva	6–3, 6–0
Men's singles – 2nd round	(Switzerland) Roger Federer [7]	(Argentina) Carlos Berlocq	6–3, 6–2, 6–1
Women's singles – 2nd round	(Denmark) Caroline Wozniacki [6]	(South Africa) Chanelle Scheepers	6–1, 6–2
Men's singles – 2nd round	(Spain) Rafael Nadal [2]	(Brazil) Rogério Dutra da Silva [Q]	6–2, 6–1, 6–0
Matches on Louis Armstrong Stadium
Event	Winner	Loser	Score
Women's singles – 2nd round	(Germany) Angelique Kerber [8]	(Canada) Eugenie Bouchard	6–4, 2–6, 6–3
Men's singles – 2nd round	(Spain) David Ferrer [4]	(Spain) Roberto Bautista Agut	6–3, 6–7^{(5–7)}, 6–1, 6–2
Women's singles – 2nd round	(Belarus) Victoria Azarenka [2]	(Canada) Aleksandra Wozniak [PR]	6–3, 6–1
Women's doubles – 1st round	(United States) Serena Williams (United States) Venus Williams	(Spain) Sílvia Soler Espinosa (Spain) Carla Suárez Navarro	6–7^{(5–7)}, 6–0, 6–3
Men's singles – 2nd round	(United States) John Isner [13]	(France) Gaël Monfils	7–5, 6–2, 4–6, 7–6^{(7–4)}
Matches on Grandstand
Event	Winner	Loser	Score
Women's singles – 2nd round	(United States) Christina McHale	(Ukraine) Elina Svitolina	6–4, 3–6, 7–5
Women's singles – 2nd round	(Serbia) Ana Ivanovic [13]	(Romania) Alexandra Dulgheru [PR]	6–2, 6–1
Men's singles – 2nd round	(France) Adrian Mannarino	(United States) Sam Querrey [26]	7–6^{(7–4)}, 7–6^{(7–5)}, 6–7^{(5–7)}, 6–4
Men's singles – 2nd round	(Canada) Milos Raonic [10]	(Spain) Pablo Andújar	6–1, 6–2, 6–4
Colored background indicates a night match

== Day 5 (August 30) ==
- Seeds out:
  - Men's singles: (Argentina) Juan Martín del Potro [6], (South Africa) Kevin Anderson [17]
  - Women's singles: (Germany) Sabine Lisicki [16], (United States) Jamie Hampton [23], (Estonia) Kaia Kanepi [25], (United Kingdom) Laura Robson [30], (Russia) Anastasia Pavlyuchenkova [32]
  - Mixed doubles: (Germany) Anna-Lena Grönefeld / (Austria) Alexander Peya [1], (Germany) Julia Görges / (India) Rohan Bopanna [3]
- Schedule

Matches on main courts
Matches on Arthur Ashe Stadium
Event	Winner	Loser	Score
Women's singles – 3rd round	(China) Li Na [5]	(United Kingdom) Laura Robson [30]	6–2, 7–5
Men's singles – 2nd round	(Serbia) Novak Djokovic [1]	(Germany) Benjamin Becker	7–6^{(7–2)}, 6–2, 6–2
Women's singles – 3rd round	(United States) Sloane Stephens [15]	(United States) Jamie Hampton [23]	6–1, 6–3
Men's singles – 2nd round	(Australia) Lleyton Hewitt	(Argentina) Juan Martín del Potro [6]	6–4, 5–7, 3–6, 7–6^{(7–2)}, 6–1
Women's singles – 3rd round	(United States) Serena Williams [1]	(Kazakhstan) Yaroslava Shvedova	6–3, 6–1
Matches on Louis Armstrong Stadium
Event	Winner	Loser	Score
Women's singles – 3rd round	(Poland) Agnieszka Radwańska [3]	(Russia) Anastasia Pavlyuchenkova [32]	6–4, 7–6^{(7–1)}
Men's singles – 2nd round	(Czech Republic) Tomáš Berdych [5]	(United States) Denis Kudla	7–6^{(7–3)}, 7–6^{(7–3)}, 6–3
Men's singles – 2nd round	(United Kingdom) Andy Murray [3]	(Argentina) Leonardo Mayer	7–5, 6–1, 3–6, 6–1
Men's doubles – 2nd round	(United States) Bob Bryan [1] (United States) Mike Bryan [1]	(United States) Eric Butorac (Denmark) Frederik Nielsen	6–3, 6–2
Matches on Grandstand
Event	Winner	Loser	Score
Men's singles – 2nd round	(Germany) Tommy Haas [12]	(Chinese Taipei) Yen-Hsun Lu	6–3, 6–4, 7–6^{(7–3)}
Women's singles – 3rd round	(Russia) Ekaterina Makarova [24]	(Germany) Sabine Lisicki [16]	6–4, 7–5
Men's singles – 2nd round	(Germany) Florian Mayer	(United States) Donald Young [Q]	7–5, 6–3, 6–4
Women's singles – 3rd round	(Spain) Carla Suárez Navarro [18]	(China) Zheng Jie	6–2, 6–4
Colored background indicates a night match

== Day 6 (August 31) ==
- Seeds out:
  - Men's singles: (United States) John Isner [13], (Spain) Feliciano López [23], (Russia) Dmitry Tursunov [32]
  - Women's singles: (Denmark) Caroline Wozniacki [6], (Czech Republic) Petra Kvitová [7], (Russia) Maria Kirilenko [14], (France) Alizé Cornet [26], (Russia) Svetlana Kuznetsova [27]
  - Men's doubles: (France) Julien Benneteau / (Serbia) Nenad Zimonjić [7]
  - Women's doubles: (United States) Raquel Kops-Jones / (United States) Abigail Spears [7], (Germany) Julia Görges / (Czech Republic) Barbora Záhlavová-Strýcová [12]
  - Mixed doubles: (Slovenia) Katarina Srebotnik / (Serbia) Nenad Zimonjić [2]
- Schedule

Matches on main courts
Matches on Arthur Ashe Stadium
Event	Winner	Loser	Score
Women's singles – 3rd round	(Serbia) Ana Ivanovic [13]	(United States) Christina McHale	4–6, 7–5, 6–4
Men's singles – 3rd round	(Spain) Rafael Nadal [2]	(Croatia) Ivan Dodig	6–4, 6–3, 6–3
Women's doubles – 2nd round	(United States) Serena Williams (United States) Venus Williams	(United States) Raquel Kops-Jones [7] (United States) Abigail Spears [7]	6–4, 6–4
Women's singles – 3rd round	(Italy) Camila Giorgi [Q]	(Denmark) Caroline Wozniacki [6]	4–6, 6–4, 6–3
Men's singles – 3rd round	(Switzerland) Roger Federer [7]	(France) Adrian Mannarino	6–3, 6–0, 6–2
Matches on Louis Armstrong Stadium
Event	Winner	Loser	Score
Women's singles – 3rd round	(Romania) Simona Halep [21]	(Russia) Maria Kirilenko [14]	6–1, 6–0
Women's singles – 3rd round	(Belarus) Victoria Azarenka [2]	(France) Alizé Cornet [26]	6–7^{(2–7)}, 6–3, 6–2
Men's singles – 3rd round	(Germany) Philipp Kohlschreiber [22]	(United States) John Isner [13]	6–4, 3–6, 7–5, 7–6^{(7–5)}
Men's singles – 3rd round	(Spain) Tommy Robredo [19]	(United Kingdom) Dan Evans [Q]	7–6^{(8–6)}, 6–1, 4–6, 7–5
Matches on Grandstand
Event	Winner	Loser	Score
Men's singles – 3rd round	(Spain) David Ferrer [4]	(Kazakhstan) Mikhail Kukushkin	6–4, 6–3, 4–6, 6–4
Men's singles – 3rd round	(Serbia) Janko Tipsarević [18]	(United States) Jack Sock	3–6, 7–6^{(7–1)}, 6–1, 6–2
Men's doubles – 2nd round	(Uruguay) Pablo Cuevas (Argentina) Horacio Zeballos	(United States) Austin Krajicek [WC] (United States) Denis Kudla [WC]	5–7, 6–3, 7–6^{(12–10)}
Women's singles – 3rd round	(Italy) Roberta Vinci [10]	(Italy) Karin Knapp	6–4, 6–3
Colored background indicates a night match

== Day 7 (September 1) ==
- Seeds out:
  - Men's singles: (Germany) Tommy Haas [12], (Italy) Andreas Seppi [20], (France) Julien Benneteau [31]
  - Women's singles: (Poland) Agnieszka Radwańska [3], (Germany) Angelique Kerber [8], (Serbia) Jelena Janković [9], (United States) Sloane Stephens [15]
  - Men's doubles: (India) Rohan Bopanna / (France) Édouard Roger-Vasselin [6], (France) Michaël Llodra / (France) Nicolas Mahut [14]
  - Women's doubles: (Germany) Anna-Lena Grönefeld / (Czech Republic) Květa Peschke [6], (United States) Liezel Huber / (Spain) Nuria Llagostera Vives [9], (France) Kristina Mladenovic / (Kazakhstan) Galina Voskoboeva [14]
  - Mixed doubles: (United States) Lisa Raymond / (Netherlands) Jean-Julien Rojer [6]
- Schedule

Matches on main courts
Matches on Arthur Ashe Stadium
Event	Winner	Loser	Score
Men's doubles – 3rd round	(United States) Bob Bryan [1] (United States) Mike Bryan [1]	(Canada) Daniel Nestor (Canada) Vasek Pospisil	6–7^{(1–6)}, 7–5, 6–2
Men's singles – 3rd round	(United Kingdom) Andy Murray [3]	(Germany) Florian Mayer	7–6^{(7–2)}, 6–2, 6–2
Women's singles – 4th round	(United States) Serena Williams [1]	(United States) Sloane Stephens [15]	6–4, 6–1
Men's singles – 3rd round	(Serbia) Novak Djokovic [1]	(Portugal) João Sousa	6–0, 6–2, 6–2
Women's singles – 4th round	(China) Li Na [5]	(Serbia) Jelena Janković [9]	6–3, 6–0
Matches on Louis Armstrong Stadium
Event	Winner	Loser	Score
Men's singles – 3rd round	(Switzerland) Stanislas Wawrinka [9]	(Cyprus) Marcos Baghdatis	6–3, 6–2, 6–7^{(1–7)}, 7–6^{(9–7)}
Women's singles – 4th round	(Spain) Carla Suárez Navarro [18]	(Germany) Angelique Kerber [8]	4–6, 6–3, 7–6^{(7–3)}
Men's singles – 3rd round	(Russia) Mikhail Youzhny [21]	(Germany) Tommy Haas [12]	6–3, 6–2, 2–6, 6–3
Women's singles – 4th round	(Russia) Ekaterina Makarova [24]	(Poland) Agnieszka Radwańska [3]	6–4, 6–4
Matches on Grandstand
Event	Winner	Loser	Score
Men's singles – 3rd round	(Czech Republic) Tomáš Berdych [5]	(France) Julien Benneteau [31]	6–0, 6–3, 6–2
Men's singles – 3rd round	(Australia) Lleyton Hewitt	(Russia) Evgeny Donskoy	6–3, 7–6^{(7–5)}, 3–6, 6–1
Men's singles – 3rd round	(Spain) Marcel Granollers	(United States) Tim Smyczek [WC]	6–4, 4–6, 0–6, 6–3, 7–5
Colored background indicates a night match

== Day 8 (September 2) ==
- Seeds out:
  - Men's singles: (Switzerland) Roger Federer [7], (Canada) Milos Raonic [10], (Serbia) Janko Tipsarević [18], (Germany) Philipp Kohlschreiber [22]
  - Women's singles: (Romania) Simona Halep [21]
  - Men's doubles: (Spain) Marcel Granollers / (Spain) Marc López [3], (United Kingdom) Colin Fleming / (United Kingdom) Jonathan Marray [12]
- Schedule

Matches on main courts
Matches on Arthur Ashe Stadium
Event	Winner	Loser	Score
Women's singles – 4th round	(Slovakia) Daniela Hantuchová	(United States) Alison Riske [WC]	6–3, 5–7, 6–2
Women's singles – 4th round	(Serbia) Ana Ivanovic [13] vs. (Belarus) Victoria Azarenka [2]		Cancelled
Men's singles – 4th round	(Spain) Rafael Nadal [2]	(Germany) Philipp Kohlschreiber [22]	6–7^{(4–7)}, 6–4, 6–3, 6–1
Men's doubles – Quarterfinals	(United States) Bob Bryan [1] (United States) Mike Bryan [1]	(United Kingdom) Colin Fleming [12] (United Kingdom) Jonathan Marray [12]	7–6^{(9–7)}, 6–4
Matches on Louis Armstrong Stadium
Event	Winner	Loser	Score
Women's singles – 4th round	(Italy) Flavia Pennetta	(Romania) Simona Halep [21]	6–2, 7–6^{(7–3)}
Men's singles – 4th round	(Spain) Tommy Robredo [19]	(Switzerland) Roger Federer [7]	7–6^{(7–3)}, 6–3, 6–4
Women's doubles – 3rd round	(Russia) Anastasia Pavlyuchenkova / (Czech Republic) Lucie Šafářová [11] vs. (United States) Serena Williams / (United States) Venus Williams		Cancelled
Matches on Grandstand
Event	Winner	Loser	Score
Women's singles – 4th round	(Italy) Roberta Vinci [10]	(Italy) Camila Giorgi [Q]	6–4, 6–2
Men's singles – 4th round	(Spain) David Ferrer [4]	(Serbia) Janko Tipsarević [18]	7–6^{(7–2)}, 3–6, 7–5, 7–6^{(7–3)}
Colored background indicates a night match

== Day 9 (September 3) ==
- Seeds out:
  - Men's singles: (Czech Republic) Tomáš Berdych [5]
  - Women's singles: (Serbia) Ana Ivanovic [13], (Spain) Carla Suárez Navarro [18], (Russia) Ekaterina Makarova [24]
  - Men's doubles: (Pakistan) Aisam-ul-Haq Qureshi / (Netherlands) Jean-Julien Rojer [5]
  - Women's doubles: (Zimbabwe) Cara Black [13] / (New Zealand) Marina Erakovic [13], (Serbia) Jelena Janković / (Croatia) Mirjana Lučić-Baroni [15], (Spain) Anabel Medina Garrigues / (Italy) Flavia Pennetta [16]
  - Mixed doubles: (Czech Republic) Květa Peschke / (Poland) Marcin Matkowski [4], (United States) Liezel Huber / (Brazil) Marcelo Melo [8]
- Schedule

Matches on main courts
Matches on Arthur Ashe Stadium
Event	Winner	Loser	Score
Women's singles – 4th round	(Belarus) Victoria Azarenka [2]	(Serbia) Ana Ivanovic [13]	4–6, 6–3, 6–4
Women's singles – Quarterfinals	(China) Li Na [5]	(Russia) Ekaterina Makarova [24]	6–4, 6–7^{(5–7)}, 6–2
Men's singles – 4th round	(Serbia) Novak Djokovic [1]	(Spain) Marcel Granollers	6–3, 6–0, 6–0
Women's singles – Quarterfinals	(United States) Serena Williams [1]	(Spain) Carla Suárez Navarro [18]	6–0, 6–0
Men's singles – 4th round	(United Kingdom) Andy Murray [3]	(Uzbekistan) Denis Istomin	6–7^{(5–7)}, 6–1, 6–4, 6–4
Matches on Louis Armstrong Stadium
Event	Winner	Loser	Score
Women's doubles – 3rd round	(Chinese Taipei) Hsieh Su-wei [4] (China) Peng Shuai [4]	(Serbia) Jelena Janković [15] (Croatia) Mirjana Lučić-Baroni [15]	6–4, 6–2
Men's singles – 4th round	(Russia) Mikhail Youzhny [21]	(Australia) Lleyton Hewitt	6–3, 3–6, 6–7^{(3–7)}, 6–4, 7–5
Men's doubles – Quarterfinals	(India) Leander Paes [4] (Czech Republic) Radek Štěpánek [4]	(Pakistan) Aisam-ul-Haq Qureshi [5] (Netherlands) Jean-Julien Rojer [5]	6–1, 6–7^{(3–7)}, 6–4
Men's singles – 4th round	(Switzerland) Stanislas Wawrinka [9]	(Czech Republic) Tomáš Berdych [5]	3–6, 6–1, 7–6^{(8–6)}, 6–2
Matches on Grandstand
Event	Winner	Loser	Score
Mixed doubles – Quarterfinals	(France) Kristina Mladenovic (Canada) Daniel Nestor	(Chinese Taipei) Chan Hao-ching (Germany) Martin Emmrich	7–6^{(7–5)}, 6–3
Women's doubles – 3rd round	(Italy) Sara Errani [1] (Italy) Roberta Vinci [1]	(Spain) Anabel Medina Garrigues [16] (Italy) Flavia Pennetta [16]	6–1, 7–5
Mixed doubles – Quarterfinals	(United States) Abigail Spears (Mexico) Santiago González	(United States) Liezel Huber [8] (Brazil) Marcelo Melo [8]	2–6, 6–1, [11–9]
Women's doubles – 3rd round	(Russia) Ekaterina Makarova [2] (Russia) Elena Vesnina [2]	(Zimbabwe) Cara Black [13] (New Zealand) Marina Erakovic [13]	5–7, 6–2, 6–4
Colored background indicates a night match

== Day 10 (September 4) ==
- Seeds out:
  - Men's singles: (Spain) David Ferrer [4], (Spain) Tommy Robredo [19]
  - Women's singles: (Italy) Roberta Vinci [10]
  - Men's doubles: (Philippines) Treat Huey / (United Kingdom) Dominic Inglot [16]
  - Women's doubles: (Russia) Ekaterina Makarova / (Russia) Elena Vesnina [2], (Russia) Nadia Petrova / (Slovenia) Katarina Srebotnik [3], (Chinese Taipei) Hsieh Su-wei / (China) Peng Shuai [4], (Russia) Anastasia Pavlyuchenkova / (Czech Republic) Lucie Šafářová [11]
  - Mixed doubles: (Spain) Anabel Medina Garrigues / (Brazil) Bruno Soares [5]
- Schedule

Matches on main courts
Matches on Arthur Ashe Stadium
Event	Winner	Loser	Score
Women's singles – Quarterfinals	(Italy) Flavia Pennetta	(Italy) Roberta Vinci [10]	6–4, 6–1
Men's singles – Quarterfinals	(France) Richard Gasquet [8]	(Spain) David Ferrer [4]	6–3, 6–1, 4–6, 2–6, 6–3
Women's singles – Quarterfinals	(Belarus) Victoria Azarenka [2]	(Slovakia) Daniela Hantuchová	6–2, 6–3
Men's singles – Quarterfinals	(Spain) Rafael Nadal [2]	(Spain) Tommy Robredo [19]	6–0, 6–2, 6–2
Matches on Louis Armstrong Stadium
Event	Winner	Loser	Score
Men's doubles – Quarterfinals	(Croatia) Ivan Dodig [10] (Brazil) Marcelo Melo [10]	(Philippines) Treat Huey [16] (United Kingdom) Dominic Inglot [16]	7–5, 6–3
Women's doubles – Quarterfinals	(India) Sania Mirza [10] (China) Zheng Jie [10]	(Chinese Taipei) Hsieh Su-wei [4] (China) Peng Shuai [4]	6–4, 7–6^{(7–5)}
Mixed doubles – Semifinals	(United States) Abigail Spears (Mexico) Santiago González	(Spain) Anabel Medina Garrigues [5] (Brazil) Bruno Soares [5]	6–3, 6–1
Women's doubles – 3rd round	(United States) Serena Williams (United States) Venus Williams	(Russia) Anastasia Pavlyuchenkova [11] (Czech Republic) Lucie Šafářová [11]	6–1, 7–6^{(7–3)}
Men's Champion's Doubles	(United States) Michael Chang (United States) Todd Martin	(Australia) Pat Cash (United States) MaliVai Washington	7–6^{(7–4)}, 6–4
Matches on Grandstand
Event	Winner	Loser	Score
Women's doubles – Quarterfinals	(Czech Republic) Andrea Hlaváčková [5] (Czech Republic) Lucie Hradecká [5]	(Russia) Nadia Petrova [3] (Slovenia) Katarina Srebotnik [3]	4–6, 6–4, 7–5
Women's doubles – Quarterfinals	(Australia) Ashleigh Barty [8] (Australia) Casey Dellacqua [8]	(Russia) Ekaterina Makarova [2] (Russia) Elena Vesnina [2]	6–2, 6–3
Mixed doubles – Semifinals	(Czech Republic) Andrea Hlaváčková [7] (Belarus) Max Mirnyi [7]	(France) Kristina Mladenovic (Canada) Daniel Nestor	7–5, 6–7^{(4–7)}, [12–10]
Colored background indicates a night match

== Day 11 (September 5) ==
- Seeds out:
  - Men's singles: (United Kingdom) Andy Murray [3], (Russia) Mikhail Youzhny [21]
  - Men's doubles: (United States) Bob Bryan / (United States) Mike Bryan [1], (Croatia) Ivan Dodig / (Brazil) Marcelo Melo [10]
  - Women's doubles: (Italy) Sara Errani / (Italy) Roberta Vinci [1], (India) Sania Mirza / (China) Zheng Jie [10]
- Schedule

Matches on main courts
Matches on Arthur Ashe Stadium
Event	Winner	Loser	Score
Men's doubles – Semifinals	(India) Leander Paes [4] (Czech Republic) Radek Štěpánek [4]	(United States) Bob Bryan [1] (United States) Mike Bryan [1]	3–6, 6–3, 6–4
Men's singles – Quarterfinals	(Switzerland) Stanislas Wawrinka [9]	(United Kingdom) Andy Murray [3]	6–4, 6–3, 6–2
Exhibition Doubles	(United States) Chris Evert (United States) Monica Seles	(United States) Jason Biggs (United States) Rainn Wilson	3–2^{(9–7)}
Men's singles – Quarterfinals	(Serbia) Novak Djokovic [1]	(Russia) Mikhail Youzhny [21]	6–3, 6–2, 3–6, 6–0
Matches on Louis Armstrong Stadium
Event	Winner	Loser	Score
Boys' singles – 3rd round	(United States) Collin Altamirano [WC]	(United States) Mackenzie McDonald [WC]	3–6, 6–4, 6–3
Women's doubles – Quarterfinals	(United States) Serena Williams (United States) Venus Williams	(Italy) Sara Errani [1] (Italy) Roberta Vinci [1]	6–3, 6–1
Men's doubles – Semifinals	(Austria) Alexander Peya [2] (Brazil) Bruno Soares [2]	(Croatia) Ivan Dodig [10] (Brazil) Marcelo Melo [10]	7–5, 6–4
Women's doubles – Semifinals	(Australia) Ashleigh Barty [8] (Australia) Casey Dellacqua [8]	(India) Sania Mirza [10] (China) Zheng Jie [10]	6–2, 6–2
Wheelchair men's singles Quarterfinals	(Japan) Shingo Kunieda [1]	(Argentina) Gustavo Fernandez	6–1, 6–2

== Day 12 (September 6) ==
- Seeds out:
  - Women's singles: (China) Li Na [5]
- Schedule

Matches on main courts
Matches on Arthur Ashe Stadium
Event	Winner	Loser	Score
Mixed doubles – Final	(Czech Republic) Andrea Hlaváčková [7] (Belarus) Max Mirnyi [7]	(United States) Abigail Spears (Mexico) Santiago González	7–6^{(7–5)}, 6–3
Women's singles – Semifinals	(Belarus) Victoria Azarenka [2]	(Italy) Flavia Pennetta	6–4, 6–2
Women's singles – Semifinals	(United States) Serena Williams [1]	(China) Li Na [5]	6–0, 6–3
Women's doubles – Semifinals	(Czech Republic) Andrea Hlaváčková [5] (Czech Republic) Lucie Hradecká [5]	(United States) Serena Williams (United States) Venus Williams	6–4, 6–2

== Day 13 (September 7) ==
- Seeds out:
  - Men's singles: (France) Richard Gasquet [8], (Switzerland) Stanislas Wawrinka [9]
  - Women's doubles: (Australia) Ashleigh Barty [8] / (Australia) Casey Dellacqua [8]
- Schedule

Matches on main courts
Matches on Arthur Ashe Stadium
Event	Winner	Loser	Score
Men's singles – Semifinals	(Serbia) Novak Djokovic [1]	(Switzerland) Stanislas Wawrinka [9]	2–6, 7–6^{(7–4)}, 3–6, 6–3, 6–4
Men's singles – Semifinals	(Spain) Rafael Nadal [2]	(France) Richard Gasquet [8]	6–4, 7–6^{(7–1)}, 6–2
Women's doubles – Final	(Czech Republic) Andrea Hlaváčková [5] (Czech Republic) Lucie Hradecká [5]	(Australia) Ashleigh Barty [8] (Australia) Casey Dellacqua [8]	6–7^{(4–7)}, 6–1, 6–4

== Day 14 (September 8) ==
- Seeds out:
  - Women's singles: (Belarus) Victoria Azarenka [2]
  - Men's doubles: (Austria) Alexander Peya [2] / (Brazil) Bruno Soares [2]
- Schedule

Matches on main courts
Matches on Arthur Ashe Stadium
Event	Winner	Loser	Score
Men's doubles – Final	(India) Leander Paes [4] (Czech Republic) Radek Štěpánek [4]	(Austria) Alexander Peya [2] (Brazil) Bruno Soares [2]	6–1, 6–3
Women's singles – Final	(United States) Serena Williams [1]	(Belarus) Victoria Azarenka [2]	7–5, 6–7^{(6–8)}, 6–1

== Day 15 (September 9) ==
- Seeds out:
  - Men's singles: (Serbia) Novak Djokovic [1]
- Schedule

Matches on main courts
Matches on Arthur Ashe Stadium
Event	Winner	Loser	Score
Men's singles – Final	(Spain) Rafael Nadal [2]	(Serbia) Novak Djokovic [1]	6–2, 3–6, 6–4, 6–1
