= Louis Armstrong Stadium =

Tennis venue in New York City

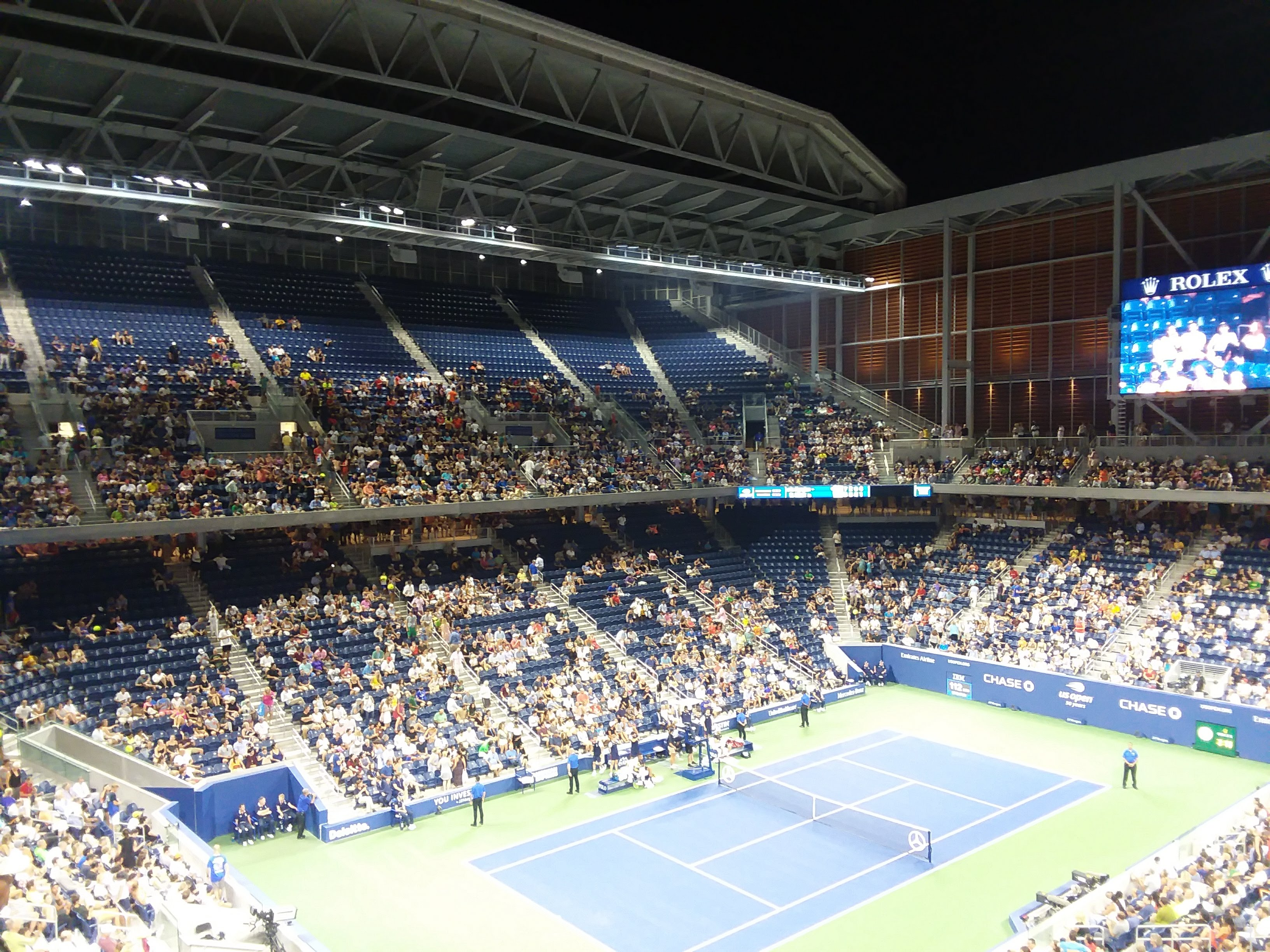
- Interactive map of Louis Armstrong Stadium
- Location: USTA Billie Jean King National Tennis Center, Flushing, Queens, New York City, U.S.
- Coordinates: 40.7510°N 73.8455°W
- Owner: USTA
- Capacity: 14,053
- Surface: Laykold
- Public transit: Long Island Rail Road (LIRR): Port Washington Branch at Mets–Willets Point; New York City Subway: trains at Mets–Willets Point

Construction
- Opened: 2018
- Architect: Rossetti Architects
- Structural engineer: Geiger Engineers

Tenant
- US Open (USTA) (2018–present)

Louis Armstrong Stadium is a 14,000-seat Retractable roof tennis stadium at the USTA Billie Jean King National Tennis Center in Flushing Meadows–Corona Park, New York City, one of the venues of the US Open. It opened for the 2018 US Open as a replacement for the 1978 stadium of the same name. It is named after jazz musician Louis Armstrong, who lived in the nearby neighborhood of Corona, Queens, until his death in 1971.

== Features ==
The stadium has a retractable roof, the largest of its kind among the No. 2 stadiums at Grand Slam venues. At the time of its opening it was the 13th largest tennis venue in the world (based on capacity). It is the first tennis stadium to have a roof and be naturally ventilated. Designers say the terra cotta material contextually relates to the traditional brick buildings on the site while using the material in a new way.

The stadium has two levels: The lower bowl has 6,400 reserved seats, and the cantilevered upper bowl has over 7,000 unreserved seats.

== History ==
=== Construction ===
The former Louis Armstrong Stadium was demolished following the 2016 US Open. For the 2017 tournament, while construction was still ongoing on the new stadium, a temporary 8,800-seat stadium was built on the site of the demolished ticket office and East Gate entrance, on Parking Lot B, close to the boardwalk ramp to the subway and LIRR trains.

=== Opening ===
The stadium was opened on August 22, 2018, when John and Patrick McEnroe played an exhibition against James Blake and Michael Chang. The first official match was played during the US Open on August 27, 2018, between Simona Halep and Kaia Kanepi. Kanepi won in two sets, which was the first time a WTA No. 1 had lost in the first round of the US Open.

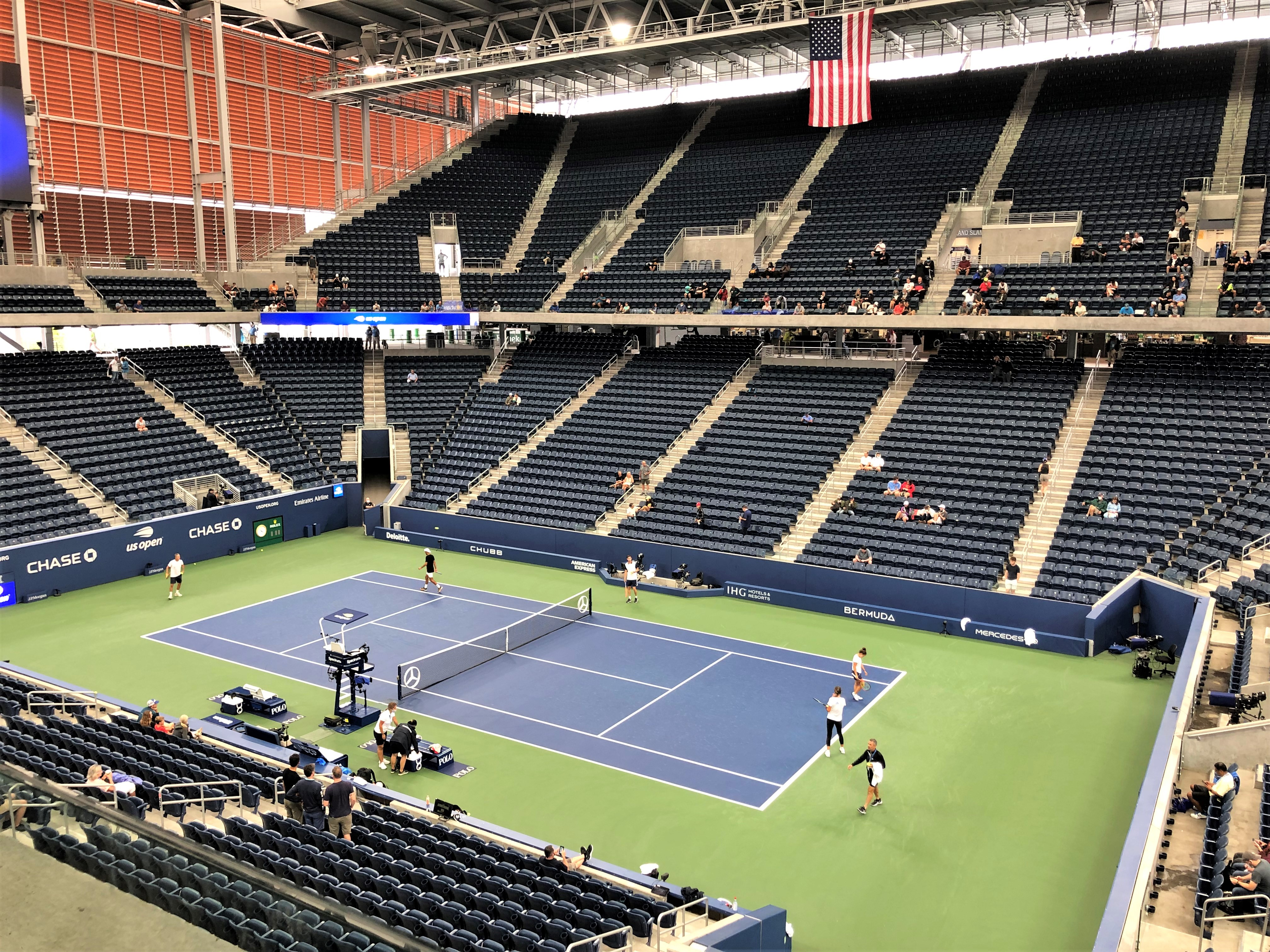
Practice at the Louis Armstrong Stadium during the 2021 US Open

== Other events ==
=== Combat sports ===
On July 12, 2025, the stadium hosted its inaugural boxing event, sanctioned by Ring Magazine. The fight card boasted prominent fighters, including Hamzah Sheeraz, Edgar Berlanga, Shakur Stevenson, and William Zepeda.

The stadium hosted its first professional wrestling event, All Elite Wrestling's Double or Nothing, on May 24, 2026.

== See also ==
- List of tennis stadiums by capacity
- Lists of stadiums
