= 2013 US Open – Men's singles qualifying =

Men's singles qualifying
- 2013 US Open

Events
| Singles | men | women | | boys | girls |
| Doubles | men | women | mixed | boys | girls |
| WC Singles | men | women | quad |
| WC Doubles | men | women | quad |
| Legends | men | women | mixed |

Qualification
| Singles | men | women |
- US Open

The qualifying round for the 2013 US Open, was played during the week of August 19. During the week, 128 players competed for 17 spots in the main US Open draw - 16 qualifiers and 1 lucky loser. Of the 32 seeded players for the qualifying rounds, 6 qualified for the main draw. The 16 qualifiers included future top 25 players: Nick Kyrgios, Ivo Karlović, and Dan Evans.

In the first round qualifying match between fellow countrymen, Germans Julian Reister and Tim Puetz, Reister won the match with a golden set in the third and deciding set.

== Seeds ==
1. (Argentina) Federico Delbonis (first round)
2. (Croatia) Ivo Karlović (qualified)
3. (Netherlands) Jesse Huta Galung (first round)
4. (Argentina) Martín Alund (first round)
5. (Colombia) Alejandro González (second round)
6. (India) Somdev Devvarman (qualified)
7. (Germany) Julian Reister (second round)
8. (France) Marc Gicquel (second round)
9. (Brazil) João Souza (second round)
10. (Russia) Teymuraz Gabashvili (first round)
11. (United States) Wayne Odesnik (second round)
12. (Romania) Marius Copil (first round)
13. (Slovenia) Blaž Kavčič (second round)
14. (Australia) Matthew Ebden (first round)
15. (United States) Alex Kuznetsov (qualifying competition)
16. (Argentina) Diego Schwartzman (qualifying competition)
17. (Japan) Go Soeda (qualified)
18. (United States) Bobby Reynolds (first round)
19. (Brazil) Rogério Dutra Silva (qualified)
20. (Canada) Jesse Levine (first round)
21. (Germany) Mischa Zverev (second round)
22. (Slovakia) Andrej Martin (qualifying competition, lucky loser)
23. (Italy) Matteo Viola (first round)
24. (Chinese Taipei) Jimmy Wang (second round)
25. (Kazakhstan) Andrey Golubev (qualifying competition)
26. (Belgium) Olivier Rochus (second round)
27. (Germany) Matthias Bachinger (second round)
28. (Serbia) Dušan Lajović (first round)
29. (Ukraine) Illya Marchenko (second round)
30. (Germany) Peter Gojowczyk (qualified)
31. (Japan) Yūichi Sugita (first round)
32. (France) Stéphane Robert (qualified)

== Qualifiers ==
1. (Kazakhstan) Mikhail Kukushkin
2. (Croatia) Ivo Karlović
3. (France) Florent Serra
4. (Germany) Philipp Petzschner
5. (Brazil) Rogério Dutra Silva
6. (India) Somdev Devvarman
7. (Italy) Thomas Fabbiano
8. (United States) Donald Young
9. (Australia) Nick Kyrgios
10. (Canada) Frank Dancevic
11. (Germany) Peter Gojowczyk
12. (Japan) Go Soeda
13. (United Kingdom) Dan Evans
14. (Argentina) Máximo González
15. (France) Stéphane Robert
16. (France) Albano Olivetti

== Lucky losers ==
1. (Slovakia) Andrej Martin

== Qualifying draw ==
Key

- Q = Qualifier
- WC = Wild card
- LL = Lucky loser
- Alt = Alternate
- ITF = ITF entry
- PR = Protected ranking
- SR = Special ranking
- SE = Special exempt
- JE = Junior exempt
- JR = Junior Accelerator Programme entrant
- CO = College Accelerator Programme entrant
- NG = Next Gen Accelerator Program entrant
- w/o = Walkover
- r = Retired
- d = Defaulted

=== First qualifier ===
First round
1 | (Argentina) Federico Delbonis | 4 | 2
(Kazakhstan) Mikhail Kukushkin | 6 | 6
(Bosnia and Herzegovina) Mirza Bašić | 6 | 6
PR | (Argentina) Eduardo Schwank | 2 | 4
(Australia) Sam Groth | 4 | 6 | 3
(Japan) Hiroki Moriya | 6 | 4 | 6
(France) Maxime Teixeira | 3 | 6 | 6
20 | (Canada) Jesse Levine | 6 | 4 | 2

Second round
(Kazakhstan) Mikhail Kukushkin | 6 | 6
(Bosnia and Herzegovina) Mirza Bašić | 4 | 3
(Japan) Hiroki Moriya | 0 | 4
(France) Maxime Teixeira | 6 | 6

Qualifying competition
(Kazakhstan) Mikhail Kukushkin | 6 | 6
(France) Maxime Teixeira | 4 | 2

=== Second qualifier ===
First round
2 | (Croatia) Ivo Karlović | 6 | 6
WC | (United States) Mackenzie McDonald | 3 | 4
(Serbia) Boris Pašanski | 0 | 4
(Argentina) Facundo Bagnis | 6 | 6
(Argentina) Agustín Velotti | 6 | 7^{7}
(Switzerland) Henri Laaksonen | 4 | 6^{4}
(Brazil) Guilherme Clezar | 3 | 3
25 | (Kazakhstan) Andrey Golubev | 6 | 6

Second round
2 | (Croatia) Ivo Karlović | 6 | 7^{7}
(Argentina) Facundo Bagnis | 4 | 6^{3}
(Argentina) Agustín Velotti | 4 | 6 | 1
25 | (Kazakhstan) Andrey Golubev | 6 | 2 | 6

Qualifying competition
2 | (Croatia) Ivo Karlović | 7^{8} | 6
25 | (Kazakhstan) Andrey Golubev | 6^{6} | 4

=== Third qualifier ===
First round
3 | (Netherlands) Jesse Huta Galung | 1 | 6 | 0
(France) Florent Serra | 6 | 3 | 6
(China) Zhang Ze | 3 | 6 | 6^{1}
(Austria) Martin Fischer | 6 | 3 | 7^{7}
(France) Josselin Ouanna | 5 | 1
(China) Wu Di | 7 | 6
(France) David Guez | 6^{3} | 6 | 2
22 | (Slovakia) Andrej Martin | 7^{7} | 3 | 6

Second round
(France) Florent Serra | 6 | 6
(Austria) Martin Fischer | 1 | 3
(China) Wu Di | 3 | 6^{1}
22 | (Slovakia) Andrej Martin | 6 | 7^{7}

Qualifying competition
(France) Florent Serra | 6 | 6
22 | (Slovakia) Andrej Martin | 1 | 3

=== Fourth qualifier ===
First round
4 | (Argentina) Martín Alund | 6^{3} | 6 | 3
(Russia) Igor Kunitsyn | 7^{7} | 1 | 6
(Germany) Philipp Petzschner | 6 | 6
WC | (United States) Gage Brymer | 4 | 2
WC | (United States) Jared Donaldson | 4 | 6 | 6
(Uzbekistan) Farrukh Dustov | 6 | 4 | 3
(Kazakhstan) Evgeny Korolev | 7^{7} | 1 | 0^{r}
29 | (Ukraine) Illya Marchenko | 6^{4} | 6 | 3

Second round
(Russia) Igor Kunitsyn | 4 | 6 | 3
(Germany) Philipp Petzschner | 6 | 1 | 6
WC | (United States) Jared Donaldson | 4 | 6 | 6
29 | (Ukraine) Illya Marchenko | 6 | 4 | 0

Qualifying competition
(Germany) Philipp Petzschner | 6 | 6
WC | (United States) Jared Donaldson | 2 | 0

=== Fifth qualifier ===
First round
5 | (Colombia) Alejandro González | 6 | 6
(Spain) Gerard Granollers | 4 | 3
WC | (United States) Dennis Novikov | 4 | 6 | 5
(Italy) Andrea Arnaboldi | 6 | 3 | 7
(Argentina) Facundo Argüello | 0^{r}
(Spain) Daniel Muñoz de la Nava | 5
(Czech Republic) Dušan Lojda | 4 | 0^{r}
19 | (Brazil) Rogério Dutra Silva | 6 | 0

Second round
5 | (Colombia) Alejandro González | 3 | 6^{4}
(Italy) Andrea Arnaboldi | 6 | 7^{7}
(Spain) Daniel Muñoz de la Nava | 3 | 3
19 | (Brazil) Rogério Dutra Silva | 6 | 6

Qualifying competition
(Italy) Andrea Arnaboldi | 3 | 6 | 6^{3}
19 | (Brazil) Rogério Dutra Silva | 6 | 4 | 7^{7}

=== Sixth qualifier ===
First round
6 | (India) Somdev Devvarman | 6 | 6
(Brazil) Fabiano de Paula | 4 | 3
(United States) Robby Ginepri | 6 | 7^{7}
PR | (Ecuador) Giovanni Lapentti | 4 | 6^{2}
(United Kingdom) James Ward | 6 | 6
(France) Jonathan Eysseric | 3 | 1
(Canada) Steven Diez | 1 | 2
27 | (Germany) Matthias Bachinger | 6 | 6

Second round
6 | (India) Somdev Devvarman | 7^{7} | 2 | 6
(United States) Robby Ginepri | 6^{4} | 6 | 2
(United Kingdom) James Ward | 2 | 6 | 6
27 | (Germany) Matthias Bachinger | 6 | 4 | 4

Qualifying competition
6 | (India) Somdev Devvarman | 6 | 3 | 6
(United Kingdom) James Ward | 3 | 6 | 4

=== Seventh qualifier ===
First round
7 | (Germany) Julian Reister | 6^{3} | 6 | 6
(Germany) Tim Puetz | 7^{7} | 4 | 0
(Austria) Gerald Melzer | 6 | 3 | 2
WC | (United States) Jarmere Jenkins | 4 | 6 | 6
(Italy) Thomas Fabbiano | 6 | 6
(Croatia) Antonio Veić | 4 | 3
(Belarus) Uladzimir Ignatik | 7 | 5 | 3
21 | (Germany) Mischa Zverev | 5 | 7 | 6

Second round
7 | (Germany) Julian Reister | 5 | 7^{7} | 3
WC | (United States) Jarmere Jenkins | 7 | 6^{5} | 6
(Italy) Thomas Fabbiano | 6 | 6
21 | (Germany) Mischa Zverev | 4 | 4

Qualifying competition
WC | (United States) Jarmere Jenkins | 3 | 4
(Italy) Thomas Fabbiano | 6 | 6

=== Eighth qualifier ===
First round
8 | (France) Marc Gicquel | 4 | 6 | 6
(Brazil) Thiago Alves | 6 | 3 | 4
(Australia) Matthew Barton | 5 | 0
(United States) Donald Young | 7 | 6
PR | (Dominican Republic) Víctor Estrella Burgos | 7 | 6
(Slovakia) Karol Beck | 5 | 3
(Argentina) Guido Andreozzi | 4 | 2
24 | (Chinese Taipei) Jimmy Wang | 6 | 6

Second round
8 | (France) Marc Gicquel | 2 | 3
(United States) Donald Young | 6 | 6
PR | (Dominican Republic) Víctor Estrella Burgos | 6 | 6
24 | (Chinese Taipei) Jimmy Wang | 4 | 4

Qualifying competition
(United States) Donald Young | 6 | 6
PR | (Dominican Republic) Víctor Estrella Burgos | 1 | 4

=== Ninth qualifier ===
First round
9 | (Brazil) João Souza | 6 | 2 | 7
(Belgium) Maxime Authom | 4 | 6 | 5
(Australia) Greg Jones | 4 | 4
(Australia) Nick Kyrgios | 6 | 6
(Germany) Cedrik-Marcel Stebe | 1 | 6 | 1
(Tunisia) Malek Jaziri | 6 | 4 | 6
(Hungary) Márton Fucsovics | 5 | 3
26 | (Belgium) Olivier Rochus | 7 | 6

Second round
9 | (Brazil) João Souza | 3 | 7^{8} | 4
(Australia) Nick Kyrgios | 6 | 6^{6} | 6
(Tunisia) Malek Jaziri | 6 | 6
26 | (Belgium) Olivier Rochus | 3 | 3

Qualifying competition
(Australia) Nick Kyrgios | 4 | 6 | 6
(Tunisia) Malek Jaziri | 6 | 3 | 4

=== Tenth qualifier ===
First round
10 | (Russia) Teymuraz Gabashvili | 2 | 4
(Canada) Frank Dancevic | 6 | 6
(France) Pierre-Hugues Herbert | 6 | 6^{5} | 6
(Argentina) Maximiliano Estévez | 1 | 7^{7} | 2
(Bosnia and Herzegovina) Damir Džumhur | 3 | 5
(Japan) Tatsuma Ito | 6 | 7
PR | (France) Laurent Rochette | 7 | 1 | 7
31 | (Japan) Yūichi Sugita | 5 | 6 | 5

Second round
(Canada) Frank Dancevic | 7 | 4 | 7^{7}
(France) Pierre-Hugues Herbert | 5 | 6 | 6^{4}
(Japan) Tatsuma Ito | 6 | 7^{7}
PR | (France) Laurent Rochette | 3 | 6^{0}

Qualifying competition
(Canada) Frank Dancevic | 5 | 6 | 6
(Japan) Tatsuma Ito | 7 | 4 | 4

=== Eleventh qualifier ===
First round
11 | (United States) Wayne Odesnik | 6 | 7
(Switzerland) Marco Chiudinelli | 1 | 5
WC | (United States) Bjorn Fratangelo | 4 | 6^{2}
(South Africa) Rik de Voest | 6 | 7^{7}
WC | (United States) Mitchell Krueger | 4 | 6 | 3
(France) Lucas Pouille | 6 | 3 | 6
(United States) Tennys Sandgren | 2 | 6 | 3
30 | (Germany) Peter Gojowczyk | 6 | 4 | 6

Second round
11 | (United States) Wayne Odesnik | 3 | 6 | 5
(South Africa) Rik de Voest | 6 | 4 | 7
(France) Lucas Pouille | 7^{7} | 5 | 4
30 | (Germany) Peter Gojowczyk | 6^{3} | 7 | 6

Qualifying competition
(South Africa) Rik de Voest | 4 | 2
30 | (Germany) Peter Gojowczyk | 6 | 6

=== Twelfth qualifier ===
First round
12 | (Romania) Marius Copil | 6^{0} | 3
(Czech Republic) Jan Hernych | 7^{7} | 6
WC | (United States) Jeff Dadamo | 4 | 3
(Spain) Guillermo Olaso | 6 | 6
(Slovakia) Miloslav Mečíř Jr. | 6 | 6
(Italy) Riccardo Bellotti | 4 | 3
(United States) Austin Krajicek | 4 | 6^{6}
17 | (Japan) Go Soeda | 6 | 7^{8}

Second round
(Czech Republic) Jan Hernych | 7 | 6
(Spain) Guillermo Olaso | 5 | 4
(Slovakia) Miloslav Mečíř Jr. | 5 | 3
17 | (Japan) Go Soeda | 7 | 6

Qualifying competition
(Czech Republic) Jan Hernych | 7^{10} | 4 | 2
17 | (Japan) Go Soeda | 6^{8} | 6 | 6

=== Thirteenth qualifier ===
First round
13 | (Slovenia) Blaž Kavčič | 6 | 6
(Turkey) Marsel İlhan | 0 | 1
(Moldova) Radu Albot | 2 | 5
(Spain) Adrián Menéndez Maceiras | 6 | 7
(Canada) Peter Polansky | 2 | 3
(United Kingdom) Dan Evans | 6 | 6
(Italy) Flavio Cipolla | 6^{5} | 6 | 6
18 | (United States) Bobby Reynolds | 7^{7} | 2 | 2

Second round
13 | (Slovenia) Blaž Kavčič | 6 | 6^{4} | 3
(Spain) Adrián Menéndez Maceiras | 3 | 7^{7} | 6
(United Kingdom) Dan Evans | 7 | 1 | 6
(Italy) Flavio Cipolla | 5 | 6 | 3

Qualifying competition
(Spain) Adrián Menéndez Maceiras | 7^{7} | 4 | 2
(United Kingdom) Dan Evans | 6^{3} | 6 | 6

=== Fourteenth qualifier ===
First round
14 | (Australia) Matthew Ebden | 1 | 6 | 2
(Ukraine) Aleksandr Nedovyesov | 6 | 4 | 6
(Israel) Amir Weintraub | 6 | 2 | 6
WC | (United States) Noah Rubin | 4 | 6 | 2
PR | (Germany) Andreas Beck | 6^{5} | 3
(Australia) Matt Reid | 7^{7} | 6
(Argentina) Máximo González | 6 | 2 | 6
23 | (Italy) Matteo Viola | 2 | 6 | 3

Second round
(Ukraine) Aleksandr Nedovyesov | 2 | 5
(Israel) Amir Weintraub | 6 | 7
(Australia) Matt Reid | 4 | 4
(Argentina) Máximo González | 6 | 6

Qualifying competition
(Israel) Amir Weintraub | 4 | 2
(Argentina) Máximo González | 6 | 6

=== Fifteenth qualifier ===
First round
15 | (United States) Alex Kuznetsov | 6 | 4
(Ukraine) Ivan Sergeyev | 2 | 1^{r}
(Argentina) Renzo Olivo | 5 | 3
(Czech Republic) Jan Mertl | 7 | 6
(Belgium) Ruben Bemelmans | 5 | 4
(Ukraine) Denys Molchanov | 7 | 6
(Netherlands) Boy Westerhof | 6 | 1 | 1
32 | (France) Stéphane Robert | 3 | 6 | 6

Second round
15 | (United States) Alex Kuznetsov | 6 | 5 | 6
(Czech Republic) Jan Mertl | 1 | 7 | 4
(Ukraine) Denys Molchanov | 5 | 4
32 | (France) Stéphane Robert | 7 | 6

Qualifying competition
15 | (United States) Alex Kuznetsov | 5 | 7^{9} | 3
32 | (France) Stéphane Robert | 7 | 6^{7} | 6

=== Sixteenth qualifier ===
First round
16 | (Argentina) Diego Schwartzman | 6 | 6
(Spain) Jordi Samper-Montaña | 2 | 4
(Belarus) Dzmitry Zhyrmont | 5 | 6 | 1
(Bosnia and Herzegovina) Aldin Šetkić | 7 | 4 | 6
(Belgium) Niels Desein | 6 | 3 | 6^{3}
(Brazil) André Ghem | 3 | 6 | 7^{7}
PR | (France) Albano Olivetti | 3 | 6 | 7^{7}
28 | (Serbia) Dušan Lajović | 6 | 3 | 6^{3}

Second round
16 | (Argentina) Diego Schwartzman | 6 | 6
(Bosnia and Herzegovina) Aldin Šetkić | 1 | 4
(Brazil) André Ghem | 6 | 3 | 6^{3}
PR | (France) Albano Olivetti | 4 | 6 | 7^{7}

Qualifying competition
16 | (Argentina) Diego Schwartzman | 6 | 5 | 4
PR | (France) Albano Olivetti | 4 | 7 | 6
