= 2013 US Open – Women's singles qualifying =

Women's singles qualifying
- 2013 US Open

Events
Singles	men	women		boys	girls
Doubles	men	women	mixed	boys	girls
WC Singles	men	women	quad
WC Doubles	men	women	quad
Legends	men	women	mixed

Qualification
Singles	men	women
- US Open

This article displays the qualifying draw for women's singles at the 2013 US Open.

== Seeds ==
1. (Israel) Shahar Pe'er (first round)
2. (Canada) Sharon Fichman (qualified)
3. (Czech Republic) Andrea Hlaváčková (qualifying competition)
4. (Brazil) Teliana Pereira (first round)
5. (China) Zhang Shuai (second round)
6. (Czech Republic) Barbora Záhlavová-Strýcová (first round)
7. (Japan) Kurumi Nara (qualified)
8. (United Kingdom) Johanna Konta (first round)
9. (Ukraine) Maryna Zanevska (first round)
10. (Croatia) Mirjana Lučić-Baroni (qualified)
11. (Czech Republic) Eva Birnerová (first round)
12. (Portugal) Michelle Larcher de Brito (qualified)
13. (Australia) Anastasia Rodionova (qualifying competition)
14. (Thailand) Luksika Kumkhum (first round)
15. (Ukraine) Nadiya Kichenok (first round)
16. (Slovenia) Tadeja Majerič (first round)
17. (Russia) Vera Dushevina (qualified)
18. (Portugal) Maria João Koehler (qualified)
19. (China) Zhou Yimiao (first round)
20. (Israel) Julia Glushko (qualified)
21. (Croatia) Ajla Tomljanović (qualified)
22. (Czech Republic) Kristýna Plíšková (second round)
23. (United States) Melanie Oudin (first round)
24. (France) Pauline Parmentier (second round)
25. (China) Duan Yingying (qualified)
26. (Italy) Camila Giorgi (qualified)
27. (Australia) Casey Dellacqua (qualified)
28. (Turkey) Çağla Büyükakçay (second round)
29. (Russia) Nina Bratchikova (second round)
30. (Austria) Patricia Mayr-Achleitner (qualifying competition, lucky loser)
31. (Russia) Alla Kudryavtseva (first round)
32. (Chinese Taipei) Chang Kai-chen (first round)

== Qualifiers ==
1. (Australia) Casey Dellacqua
2. (Canada) Sharon Fichman
3. (United States) Grace Min
4. (United States) Victoria Duval
5. (United States) Coco Vandeweghe
6. (China) Duan Yingying
7. (Japan) Kurumi Nara
8. (Portugal) Maria João Koehler
9. (Russia) Vera Dushevina
10. (Croatia) Mirjana Lučić-Baroni
11. (South Africa) Chanel Simmonds
12. (Portugal) Michelle Larcher de Brito
13. (Israel) Julia Glushko
14. (Croatia) Ajla Tomljanović
15. (Serbia) Aleksandra Krunić
16. (Italy) Camila Giorgi

== Lucky losers ==
1. (Austria) Patricia Mayr-Achleitner
2. (Australia) Olivia Rogowska

== Qualifying draw ==
Key

- Q = Qualifier
- WC = Wild card
- LL = Lucky loser
- Alt = Alternate
- ITF = ITF entry
- PR = Protected ranking
- SR = Special ranking
- SE = Special exempt
- JE = Junior exempt
- JR = Junior Accelerator Programme entrant
- CO = College Accelerator Programme entrant
- NG = Next Gen Accelerator Program entrant
- w/o = Walkover
- r = Retired
- d = Defaulted

=== First qualifier ===
First round
1	(Israel) Shahar Pe'er	4	6^{3}
(Russia) Ksenia Pervak	6	7^{7}
(Paraguay) Verónica Cepede Royg	1	3
WC	(United States) Jamie Loeb	6	6
(France) Claire Feuerstein	6	7^{7}
WC	(United States) Brianna Morgan	1	6^{4}
(United States) Chieh-yu Hsu	3	2
27	(Australia) Casey Dellacqua	6	6

Second round
(Russia) Ksenia Pervak	6	2	6
WC	(United States) Jamie Loeb	1	6	1
(France) Claire Feuerstein	2	1
27	(Australia) Casey Dellacqua	6	6

Qualifying competition
(Russia) Ksenia Pervak	5	3
27	(Australia) Casey Dellacqua	7	6

=== Second qualifier ===
First round
2	(Canada) Sharon Fichman	6	6
(Australia) Monique Adamczak	3	0
(Montenegro) Danka Kovinić	6	6
(Canada) Gabriela Dabrowski	3	0
(Japan) Junri Namigata	3	3
(Russia) Alexandra Panova	6	6
(Australia) Sacha Jones	7	1	1
24	(France) Pauline Parmentier	5	6	6

Second round
2	(Canada) Sharon Fichman	2	7	6
(Montenegro) Danka Kovinić	6	5	1
(Russia) Alexandra Panova	6	6
24	(France) Pauline Parmentier	3	4

Qualifying competition
2	(Canada) Sharon Fichman	7^{7}	6
(Russia) Alexandra Panova	6^{3}	4

=== Third qualifier ===
First round
3	(Czech Republic) Andrea Hlaváčková	6	6
(Argentina) Florencia Molinero	1	0
(Germany) Anna-Lena Friedsam	2	2
(Austria) Tamira Paszek	6	6
(France) Alizé Lim	4	4
(United States) Grace Min	6	6
(Switzerland) Viktorija Golubic	6	6
19	(China) Zhou Yimiao	2	2

Second round
3	(Czech Republic) Andrea Hlaváčková	6	2	6
(Austria) Tamira Paszek	2	6	2
(United States) Grace Min	6	6
(Switzerland) Viktorija Golubic	2	2

Qualifying competition
3	(Czech Republic) Andrea Hlaváčková	4	1
(United States) Grace Min	6	6

=== Fourth qualifier ===
First round
4	(Brazil) Teliana Pereira	1	3
WC	(United States) Victoria Duval	6	6
(France) Irena Pavlovic	6	1	5
(Russia) Valeria Solovyeva	3	6	7
(Romania) Cristina Dinu	3	2
(Croatia) Tereza Mrdeža	6	6
(Poland) Magda Linette	6	1	2
28	(Turkey) Çağla Büyükakçay	2	6	6

Second round
WC	(United States) Victoria Duval	6	6
(Russia) Valeria Solovyeva	2	1
(Croatia) Tereza Mrdeža	6	2	6
28	(Turkey) Çağla Büyükakçay	3	6	0

Qualifying competition
WC	(United States) Victoria Duval	6	6
(Croatia) Tereza Mrdeža	3	3

=== Fifth qualifier ===
First round
5	(China) Zhang Shuai	6	6
(France) Julie Coin	3	2
(United States) Coco Vandeweghe	6	6
(Italy) Corinna Dentoni	4	3
(Australia) Storm Sanders	4	1
(Uzbekistan) Nigina Abduraimova	6	6
(Slovenia) Petra Rampre	6	6
32	(Chinese Taipei) Chang Kai-chen	0	4

Second round
5	(China) Zhang Shuai	4	6	3
(United States) Coco Vandeweghe	6	3	6
(Uzbekistan) Nigina Abduraimova	5	6	6
(Slovenia) Petra Rampre	7	2	3

Qualifying competition
(United States) Coco Vandeweghe	6	3	6
(Uzbekistan) Nigina Abduraimova	2	6	3

=== Sixth qualifier ===
First round
6	(Czech Republic) Barbora Záhlavová-Strýcová	3	4
(United States) Madison Brengle	6	6
(Japan) Erika Sema	6	4	6
(Spain) Arantxa Parra Santonja	3	6	0
(Russia) Marta Sirotkina	3	1
(Belgium) An-Sophie Mestach	6	6
WC	(United States) Jan Abaza	1	0
25	(China) Duan Yingying	6	6

Second round
(United States) Madison Brengle	6	7^{7}
(Japan) Erika Sema	4	6^{1}
(Belgium) An-Sophie Mestach	4	2
25	(China) Duan Yingying	6	6

Qualifying competition
(United States) Madison Brengle	7^{7}	1	2
25	(China) Duan Yingying	6^{3}	6	6

=== Seventh qualifier ===
First round
7	(Japan) Kurumi Nara	6	7^{11}
(Argentina) María Irigoyen	1	6^{9}
(Poland) Katarzyna Piter	6	5	6
(Croatia) Ana Vrljić	4	7	2
(Russia) Ekaterina Bychkova	4	6	4
(Poland) Paula Kania	6	4	6
(China) Zhang Yuxuan	0	3
30	(Austria) Patricia Mayr-Achleitner	6	6

Second round
7	(Japan) Kurumi Nara	6	7^{7}
(Poland) Katarzyna Piter	3	6^{4}
(Poland) Paula Kania	6	4	6^{4}
30	(Austria) Patricia Mayr-Achleitner	1	6	7^{7}

Qualifying competition
7	(Japan) Kurumi Nara	7	6
30	(Austria) Patricia Mayr-Achleitner	5	4

=== Eighth qualifier ===
First round
8	(United Kingdom) Johanna Konta	5	4
(Australia) Olivia Rogowska	7	6
(Netherlands) Richèl Hogenkamp	4	6	6
(Serbia) Jovana Jakšić	6	4	1
(Japan) Yurika Sema	2	6	3
(Romania) Andreea Mitu	6	4	6
(Ukraine) Yuliya Beygelzimer	4	3
18	(Portugal) Maria João Koehler	6	6

Second round
(Australia) Olivia Rogowska	4	6	6
(Netherlands) Richèl Hogenkamp	6	3	4
(Romania) Andreea Mitu	7^{7}	3	3
18	(Portugal) Maria João Koehler	6^{5}	6	6

Qualifying competition
(Australia) Olivia Rogowska	2	2
18	(Portugal) Maria João Koehler	6	6

=== Ninth qualifier ===
First round
9	(Ukraine) Maryna Zanevska	6^{1}	4
(Chinese Taipei) Chan Yung-jan	7^{7}	6
(United Kingdom) Tara Moore	4	6	4
(Colombia) Catalina Castaño	6	1	6
(Switzerland) Amra Sadiković	6	6
(Ukraine) Lyudmyla Kichenok	3	3
(Thailand) Varatchaya Wongteanchai	3	2
17	(Russia) Vera Dushevina	6	6

Second round
(Chinese Taipei) Chan Yung-jan	4	3
(Colombia) Catalina Castaño	6	6
(Switzerland) Amra Sadiković	1	1
17	(Russia) Vera Dushevina	6	6

Qualifying competition
(Colombia) Catalina Castaño	6	5	1
17	(Russia) Vera Dushevina	2	7	6

=== Tenth qualifier ===
First round
10	(Croatia) Mirjana Lučić-Baroni	6	6
WC	(United States) Brooke Austin	2	2
(Ukraine) Kateryna Kozlova	6	7^{10}
(Tunisia) Ons Jabeur	4	6^{8}
(Italy) Nastassja Burnett	4	7^{7}	2
(Kazakhstan) Sesil Karatantcheva	6	6^{0}	6
(Turkey) Pemra Özgen	6	6
31	(Russia) Alla Kudryavtseva	3	4

Second round
10	(Croatia) Mirjana Lučić-Baroni	6	6
(Ukraine) Kateryna Kozlova	4	3
(Kazakhstan) Sesil Karatantcheva	7	6
(Turkey) Pemra Özgen	5	2

Qualifying competition
10	(Croatia) Mirjana Lučić-Baroni	6	6
(Kazakhstan) Sesil Karatantcheva	4	2

=== Eleventh qualifier ===
First round
11	(Czech Republic) Eva Birnerová	1	2
WC	(United States) Taylor Townsend	6	6
(United Kingdom) Samantha Murray	6	6
(Australia) Arina Rodionova	4	1
(Czech Republic) Renata Voráčová	5	5
(South Africa) Chanel Simmonds	7	7
(Germany) Anne Schäfer	3	3
29	(Russia) Nina Bratchikova	6	6

Second round
WC	(United States) Taylor Townsend	6	7
(United Kingdom) Samantha Murray	4	5
(South Africa) Chanel Simmonds	6	6
29	(Russia) Nina Bratchikova	0	2

Qualifying competition
WC	(United States) Taylor Townsend	2	6	5
(South Africa) Chanel Simmonds	6	2	7

=== Twelfth qualifier ===
First round
12	(Portugal) Michelle Larcher de Brito	4	6	6
(United States) Chiara Scholl	6	4	2
(Kazakhstan) Zarina Diyas	6	6
(Belarus) Ilona Kremen	3	1
(Liechtenstein) Stephanie Vogt	3	0
(Ukraine) Olga Savchuk	6	6
(United Kingdom) Elena Baltacha	6	3	6
23	(United States) Melanie Oudin	1	6	2

Second round
12	(Portugal) Michelle Larcher de Brito	6	5	6
(Kazakhstan) Zarina Diyas	4	7	4
(Ukraine) Olga Savchuk	3	0
(United Kingdom) Elena Baltacha	6	6

Qualifying competition
12	(Portugal) Michelle Larcher de Brito	4	7	6
(United Kingdom) Elena Baltacha	6	5	1

=== Thirteenth qualifier ===
First round
13	(Australia) Anastasia Rodionova	6	6
(United States) Irina Falconi	4	1
WC	(Japan) Mayo Hibi	6	3	6
WC	(United States) Allie Kiick	3	6	1
(Canada) Stéphanie Dubois	4	6	7^{9}
(Italy) Maria Elena Camerin	6	3	6^{7}
(China) Zheng Saisai	3	4
20	(Israel) Julia Glushko	6	6

Second round
13	(Australia) Anastasia Rodionova	6	6
WC	(Japan) Mayo Hibi	4	2
(Canada) Stéphanie Dubois	6	4	2
20	(Israel) Julia Glushko	3	6	6

Qualifying competition
13	(Australia) Anastasia Rodionova	3	2
20	(Israel) Julia Glushko	6	6

=== Fourteenth qualifier ===
First round
14	(Thailand) Luksika Kumkhum	4	4
(France) Stéphanie Foretz Gacon	6	6
(Venezuela) Adriana Pérez	1	6	3
(Belgium) Alison van Uytvanck	6	4	6
(Japan) Sachie Ishizu	7	6
Alt	(Croatia) Ana Savić	5	1
(Austria) Melanie Klaffner	2	3
21	(Croatia) Ajla Tomljanović	6	6

Second round
(France) Stéphanie Foretz Gacon	2	3
(Belgium) Alison van Uytvanck	6	6
(Japan) Sachie Ishizu	7^{7}	4	0
21	(Croatia) Ajla Tomljanović	6^{4}	6	6

Qualifying competition
(Belgium) Alison van Uytvanck	4	2
21	(Croatia) Ajla Tomljanović	6	6

=== Fifteenth qualifier ===
First round
15	(Ukraine) Nadiya Kichenok	5	4
(Russia) Daria Gavrilova	7	6
(Serbia) Aleksandra Krunić	6	6
(Germany) Carina Witthöft	3	1
(Slovenia) Maša Zec Peškirič	3	1
WC	(United States) Louisa Chirico	6	6
PR	(Belgium) Tamaryn Hendler	3	0
22	(Czech Republic) Kristýna Plíšková	6	6

Second round
(Russia) Daria Gavrilova	2	1
(Serbia) Aleksandra Krunić	6	6
WC	(United States) Louisa Chirico	7	5	6
22	(Czech Republic) Kristýna Plíšková	5	7	2

Qualifying competition
(Serbia) Aleksandra Krunić	6	6
WC	(United States) Louisa Chirico	1	3

=== Sixteenth qualifier ===
First round
16	(Slovenia) Tadeja Majerič	3	6	3
(United States) Julia Cohen	6	4	6
(Germany) Laura Siegemund	6^{5}	6	7^{7}
(Bosnia and Herzegovina) Jasmina Tinjić	7^{7}	4	6^{5}
(Spain) Beatriz García Vidagany	2	7	1
(Netherlands) Angelique van der Meet	6	5	6
(Japan) Risa Ozaki	3	2
26	(Italy) Camila Giorgi	6	6

Second round
(United States) Julia Cohen	5	6	6
(Germany) Laura Siegemund	7	4	0
(Netherlands) Angelique van der Meet	6	3	4
26	(Italy) Camila Giorgi	4	6	6

Qualifying competition
(United States) Julia Cohen	1	0
26	(Italy) Camila Giorgi	6	6
