= 2013 US Open – Boys' doubles =

Boys' doubles
- 2013 US Open

Final
- Champions: (Poland) Kamil Majchrzak (United States) Martin Redlicki
- Runners-up: (France) Quentin Halys (Portugal) Frederico Ferreira Silva
- Score: 6–3, 6–4

Events
Singles	men	women		boys	girls
Doubles	men	women	mixed	boys	girls
WC Singles	men	women	quad
WC Doubles	men	women	quad
Legends	men	women	mixed
- US Open

Kyle Edmund and Frederico Ferreira Silva are the defending champions having won the 2012 event. This year Edmund decided not to participate, while Frederico Ferreira Silva partners up with Quentin Halys, but lost to Kamil Majchrzak and Martin Redlicki in the final.

== Seeds ==
1. (Croatia) Borna Ćorić / (United States) Stefan Kozlov (first round)
2. (Chile) Christian Garín / (Chile) Nicolás Jarry (first round)
3. (Russia) Karen Khachanov / (Russia) Daniil Medvedev (first round)
4. (Japan) Yoshihito Nishioka / (Peru) Jorge Brian Panta (second round)
5. (South Korea) Chung Hyeon / (South Korea) Lee Duck-hee (second round)
6. (Russia) Andrey Rublev / (Germany) Alexander Zverev (quarterfinals)
7. (Belgium) Clément Geens / (United States) Noah Rubin (second round)
8. (Australia) Thanasi Kokkinakis / (Italy) Gianluigi Quinzi (quarterfinals)

== Draw ==
Key

- Q = Qualifier
- WC = Wild card
- LL = Lucky loser
- Alt = Alternate
- ITF = ITF entry
- PR = Protected ranking
- SR = Special ranking
- SE = Special exempt
- JE = Junior exempt
- JR = Junior Accelerator Programme entrant
- CO = College Accelerator Programme entrant
- NG = Next Gen Accelerator Program entrant
- w/o = Walkover
- r = Retired
- d = Defaulted

=== Finals ===
Semifinals
(Poland) Kamil Majchrzak (United States) Martin Redlicki	7^{7}	6
(Germany) Johannes Härteis (Germany) Hannes Wagner	6^{3}	4
(France) Quentin Halys (Portugal) Frederico Ferreira Silva	6	6
(Germany) Maximilian Marterer (Austria) Lucas Miedler	2	4

Final
(Poland) Kamil Majchrzak (United States) Martin Redlicki	6	6
(France) Quentin Halys (Portugal) Frederico Ferreira Silva	3	4

=== Top half ===
First round
1	(Croatia) Borna Ćorić (United States) Stefan Kozlov	6^{3}	6	[6]
(Poland) Kamil Majchrzak (United States) Martin Redlicki	7^{7}	3	[10]
(France) Maxime Janvier (France) Johan-Sébastien Tatlot	4	6	[5]
WC	(United States) Taylor Harry Fritz (United States) Anudeep Kodali	6	3	[10]
WC	(United States) Collin Altamirano (United States) Gage Brymer	3	2
(Brazil) R Matos (Brazil) Marcelo Zormann	6	6
(United States) Reilly Opelka (Russia) Roman Safiullin	4	6^{6}
6	(Russia) Andrey Rublev (Germany) Alexander Zverev	6	7^{8}
3	(Russia) Karen Khachanov (Russia) Daniil Medvedev	6	3	[9]
(Japan) Naoki Nakagawa (United Kingdom) Cameron Norrie	1	6	[11]
(South Korea) Hong Seong-chan (South Korea) Kim Young-seok	7^{7}	5	[10]
WC	(United States) Jared Donaldson (United States) Daniel Kerznerman	6^{5}	7	7
(Germany) Johannes Härteis (Germany) Hannes Wagner	6	7
(Turkey) Cem İlkel (Poland) Piotr Łomacki	2	5
(Japan) Ken Onishi (Japan) Takashi Saito	6^{3}	1
7	(Belgium) Clément Geens (United States) Noah Rubin	7^{7}	6

Second round
(Poland) K Majchrzak (United States) M Redlicki	6	7^{7}
WC	(United States) TH Fritz (United States) A Kodali	4	6^{5}
(Brazil) R Matos (Brazil) M Zormann	7	4	[8]
6	(Russia) A Rublev (Germany) A Zverev	5	6	[10]
(Japan) N Nakagawa (United Kingdom) C Norrie	7^{7}	4	[8]
(South Korea) S-c Hong (South Korea) YS Kim	6^{2}	6	[10]
(Germany) J Härteis (Germany) H Wagner	6	6
7	(Belgium) C Geens (United States) N Rubin	3	4

Quarterfinals
(Poland) K Majchrzak (United States) M Redlicki	6	6
6	(Russia) A Rublev (Germany) A Zverev	1	1
(South Korea) S-c Hong (South Korea) YS Kim	4	7^{7}	[9]
(Germany) J Härteis (Germany) H Wagner	6	6^{5}	[11]

Semifinals
(Poland) K Majchrzak (United States) M Redlicki	7^{7}	6
(Germany) J Härteis (Germany) H Wagner	6^{3}	4

=== Bottom half ===
First round
8	(Australia) Thanasi Kokkinakis (Italy) Gianluigi Quinzi	6	6
(United States) Mackenzie McDonald (Chile) Guillermo Núñez	3	4
(United States) Luca Corinteli (Sweden) Elias Ymer	7^{7}	6
(United States) Tommy Paul (United States) Alex Rybakov	6^{2}	4
(Australia) Harry Bourchier (Australia) Bradley Mousley	5	4
(France) Quentin Halys (Portugal) Frederico Ferreira Silva	7	6
(Mexico) Gerardo López Villaseñor (France) Alexandre Muller	7^{7}	1	[4]
4	(Japan) Yoshihito Nishioka (Peru) Jorge Brian Panta	6^{2}	6	[10]
5	(South Korea) Chung Hyeon (South Korea) Lee Duck-hee	7	6
WC	(United States) JC Aragone (United States) Ernesto Escobedo	5	4
(Slovakia) Matej Maruščák (Denmark) Simon Friis Søndergaard	6	6
(Japan) Yusuke Takahashi (China) Zheng Weiqiang	3	2
(Germany) Maximilian Marterer (Austria) Lucas Miedler	6	6
(Brazil) Gabriel Vellinho Hocevar (United States) Francis Tiafoe	2	1
(Chile) Jaime Galleguillos (Canada) Tommy Mylnikov	6	2	[10]
2	(Chile) Christian Garín (Chile) Nicolás Jarry	4	6	[5]

Second round
8	(Australia) T Kokkinakis (Italy) G Quinzi	3	6	[10]
(United States) L Corinteli (Sweden) E Ymer	6	0	[6]
(France) Q Halys (Portugal) FF Silva	4	6	[10]
4	(Japan) Y Nishioka (Peru) JB Panta	6	3	[2]
5	(South Korea) H Chung (South Korea) DH Lee	3	3
(Slovakia) M Maruščák (Denmark) SF Søndergaard	6	6
(Germany) M Marterer (Austria) L Miedler	6	7
(Chile) J Galleguillos (Canada) T Mylnikov	4	5

Quarterfinals
8	(Australia) T Kokkinakis (Italy) G Quinzi	2	6^{7}
(France) Q Halys (Portugal) FF Silva	6	7^{9}
(Slovakia) M Maruščák (Denmark) SF Søndergaard	3	4
(Germany) M Marterer (Austria) L Miedler	6	6

Semifinals
(France) Q Halys (Portugal) FF Silva	6	6
(Germany) M Marterer (Austria) L Miedler	2	4
