= Collin Altamirano =

American tennis player (born 1995)

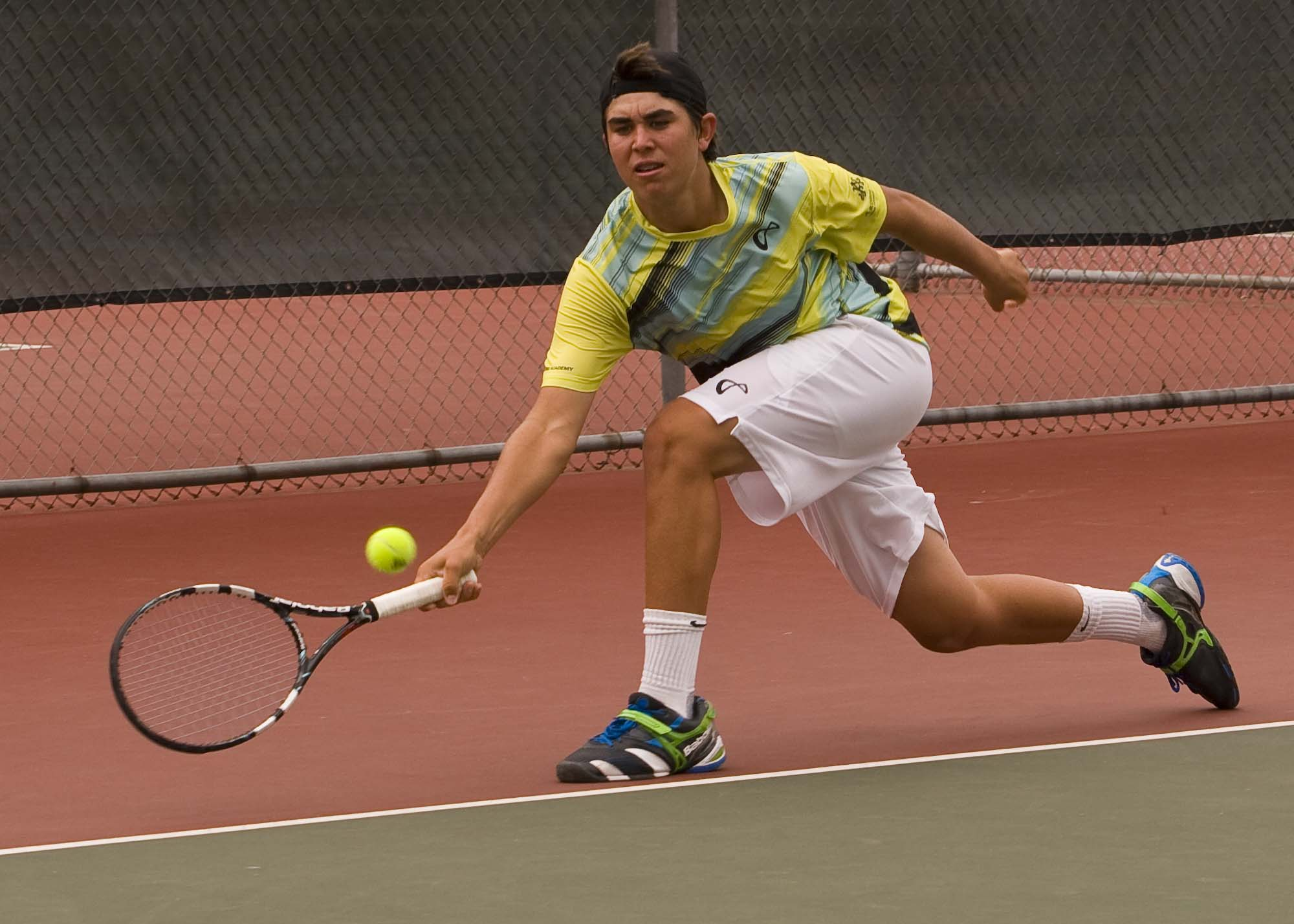
- Country (sports): United States
- Residence: Sacramento, California, USA
- Born: December 7, 1995 (age 29) Sacramento, California
- Height: 6 ft 2 in (188 cm)
- Turned pro: 2017
- Plays: Right-handed (two-handed backhand)
- College: University of Virginia
- Prize money: $192,227

Singles
- Career record: 0–2 (at ATP Tour level, Grand Slam level, and in Davis Cup)
- Career titles: 0
- Highest ranking: No. 267 (24 June 2019)
- Current ranking: No. 844 (24 October 2024)

Grand Slam singles results
- US Open: 1R (2013, 2018)

Doubles
- Career record: 0–0
- Career titles: 0
- Highest ranking: No. 458 (30 November 2020)
- Current ranking: No. 988 (24 October 2024)
- Last updated on: 24 Oct 2024.

Collin Altamirano (born December 7, 1995) is an American professional tennis player.

Altamirano won the 2013 USTA Boys 18 National Championship as an unseeded player, the first ever to do so, defeating Jared Donaldson 6–1, 6–2, 6–4 in the final. This earned him a wild card entry into the 2013 U.S. Open where he lost to 22-seed Philipp Kohlschreiber of Germany in the first round. Prior to the 2013 U.S. Open, Altamirano had only played in six professional-level matches, all at the ITF Men's Circuit level (commonly referred to as Futures), and had lost all six.

== Gear ==
Altamirano currently plays with the Wilson Blade racquet and Solinco Tour Bite strings, wearing Babolat Propulse 4 shoes.

== Tournaments ==
- 2013 USTA Boys' 18 Champion - Kalamazoo, MI - USTA Nationals: Collin Altamirano becomes first unseeded player to win singles title
- 2013 US Open – Boys' singles – Lost in quarterfinals to #1 seeded Alexander Zverev of Germany. Collin was the only American in the Junior Boys' Quarterfinals.
- 2013 US Open – Men's singles – Lost in first round to Philipp Kohlschreiber
- 2018 US Open – Men's singles – Lost in first round to Ugo Humbert

== ATP Challenger and ITF Futures finals ==
=== Singles: 4 (3–1) ===
Legend (singles) ATP Challenger Tour (0–0) ITF Futures Tour (3–1)	Titles by surface Hard (3–1) Clay (0–0) Grass (0–0) Carpet (0–0)

Result	W–L	Date	Tournament	Tier	Surface	Opponent	Score
Loss	0–1	Jan 2017	USA F2, Long Beach	Futures	Hard	(United States) Marcos Giron	6–7^{(3–7)}, 1–6
Win	1–1	Jan 2018	USA F2, Long Beach	Futures	Hard	(Ecuador) Emilio Gómez	6–1, 7–5
Win	2–1	May 2018	Singapore F2, Singapore	Futures	Hard	(Japan) Takuto Niki	7–6^{(7–5)}, 6–3
Win	3–1	Nov 2019	M15 Austin, US	World Tennis Tour	Hard	(United Kingdom) Jacob Fearnley	4–6, 6–4, 6–4
