= 2013 US Open – Girls' doubles =

Girls' doubles
- 2013 US Open

Final
- Champions: (Czech Republic) Barbora Krejčíková (Czech Republic) Kateřina Siniaková
- Runners-up: (Switzerland) Belinda Bencic (Spain) Sara Sorribes Tormo
- Score: 6–3, 6–4

Events
Singles	men	women		boys	girls
Doubles	men	women	mixed	boys	girls
WC Singles	men	women	quad
WC Doubles	men	women	quad
Legends	men	women	mixed
- US Open

Gabrielle Andrews and Taylor Townsend were the defending champions having won the 2012 event, but neither player chose to defend their title.

Barbora Krejčíková and Kateřina Siniaková won the tournament, defeating Belinda Bencic and Sara Sorribes Tormo in the final, 6–3, 6–4. This was the Czech pair's third Grand Slam victory in a row. Krejčíková became the fourth girls' doubles player to reach all of the Grand Slam finals in a calendar year after Anastasia Pavlyuchenkova, Urszula Radwańska and Tímea Babos.

== Seeds ==
1. (Czech Republic) Barbora Krejčíková / (Czech Republic) Kateřina Siniaková (champions)
2. (Croatia) Ana Konjuh / (Germany) Antonia Lottner (semifinals)
3. (Switzerland) Belinda Bencic / (Spain) Sara Sorribes Tormo (final)
4. (Belgium) Elise Mertens / (Turkey) İpek Soylu (semifinals)
5. (Ukraine) Anhelina Kalinina / (Belarus) Iryna Shymanovich (quarterfinals)
6. (United States) Louisa Chirico / (Mexico) Alejandra Cisneros (first round)
7. (Italy) Alice Matteucci / (Serbia) Nina Stojanović (quarterfinals)
8. (Japan) Mayo Hibi / (Japan) Ayaka Okuno (quarterfinals)

== Draw ==
Key

- Q = Qualifier
- WC = Wild card
- LL = Lucky loser
- Alt = Alternate
- ITF = ITF entry
- PR = Protected ranking
- SR = Special ranking
- SE = Special exempt
- JE = Junior exempt
- JR = Junior Accelerator Programme entrant
- CO = College Accelerator Programme entrant
- NG = Next Gen Accelerator Program entrant
- w/o = Walkover
- r = Retired
- d = Defaulted

=== Finals ===
Semifinals
1	(Czech Republic) Barbora Krejčíková (Czech Republic) Kateřina Siniaková	7	6
4	(Belgium) Elise Mertens (Turkey) İpek Soylu	5	4
3	(Switzerland) Belinda Bencic (Spain) Sara Sorribes Tormo	6^{5}	6	[12]
2	(Croatia) Ana Konjuh (Germany) Antonia Lottner	7^{7}	3	[10]

Final
1	(Czech Republic) Barbora Krejčíková (Czech Republic) Kateřina Siniaková	6	6
3	(Switzerland) Belinda Bencic (Spain) Sara Sorribes Tormo	3	4

=== Top half ===
First round
1	(Czech Republic) Barbora Krejčíková (Czech Republic) Kateřina Siniaková	6	6
(Brazil) Carolina Alves (Australia) Sara Tomic	2	2
(Egypt) Sandra Samir (United Kingdom) Isabelle Wallace	6	3	[10]
(United States) Johnnise Renaud (Mexico) Victoria Rodríguez	4	6	[8]
WC	(United States) Brooke Austin (United States) Kaitlyn McCarthy	3	4
(United Kingdom) Katy Dunne (Serbia) Ivana Jorović	6	6
(Australia) Naiktha Bains (Kazakhstan) Asiya Dair	3	1
5	(Ukraine) Anhelina Kalinina (Belarus) Iryna Shymanovich	6	6
4	(Belgium) Elise Mertens (Turkey) İpek Soylu	6	7
(United Kingdom) Katie Boulter (Ukraine) Viktoriya Lushkova	2	5
(Romania) Ioana Ducu (Latvia) Jeļena Ostapenko	7	3	[6]
(Chinese Taipei) Hsu Ching-wen (China) Xu Shilin	5	6	[10]
WC	(United States) Emma Christine Higuchi (United States) Claire Liu	2	3
(Russia) Veronika Kudermetova (Russia) Maria Marfutina	6	6
(United States) Usue Maitane Arconada (Mexico) Cassandra Vázquez	1	5
8	(Japan) Mayo Hibi (Japan) Ayaka Okuno	6	7

Second round
1	(Czech Republic) B Krejčíková (Czech Republic) K Siniaková	6	7
(Egypt) S Samir (United Kingdom) I Wallace	2	5
(United Kingdom) K Dunne (Serbia) I Jorović	2	6	[3]
5	(Ukraine) A Kalinina (Belarus) I Shymanovich	6	3	[10]
4	(Belgium) E Mertens (Turkey) İ Soylu	3	6	[10]
(Chinese Taipei) C-w Hsu (China) S Xu	6	2	[3]
(Russia) V Kudermetova (Russia) M Marfutina	3	7^{7}	[10]
8	(Japan) M Hibi (Japan) A Okuno	6	6^{4}	[12]

Quarterfinals
1	(Czech Republic) B Krejčíková (Czech Republic) K Siniaková	6	6
5	(Ukraine) A Kalinina (Belarus) I Shymanovich	1	3
4	(Belgium) E Mertens (Turkey) İ Soylu	6	6^{5}	[10]
8	(Japan) M Hibi (Japan) A Okuno	4	7^{7}	[7]

Semifinals
1	(Czech Republic) B Krejčíková (Czech Republic) K Siniaková	7	6
4	(Belgium) E Mertens (Turkey) İ Soylu	5	4

=== Bottom half ===
First round
6	(United States) Louisa Chirico (Mexico) Alejandra Cisneros	3	6	[6]
(Japan) Mami Adachi (Japan) Hikari Yamamoto	6	4	[10]
(United Kingdom) Harriet Dart (Croatia) Jana Fett	6	6
(Canada) Marika Akkerman (Paraguay) Camila Giangreco Campiz	2	1
(Czech Republic) Marie Bouzková (Slovakia) Kristína Schmiedlová	6	7^{7}
(United States) Christina Makarova (Russia) Alina Silich	3	6^{1}
WC	(United States) CiCi Bellis (United States) Katerina Stewart	4	1
3	(Switzerland) Belinda Bencic (Spain) Sara Sorribes Tormo	6	6
7	(Italy) Alice Matteucci (Serbia) Nina Stojanović	6	6
(France) Fiona Ferro (France) Margot Yerolymos	4	1
WC	(United States) Tornado Alicia Black (United States) Peggy Porter	6	7^{7}
(Russia) Varvara Flink (United States) Jamie Loeb	3	6^{5}
(Thailand) Kamonwan Buayam (China) Sun Ziyue	6^{6}	6	[5]
(Hong Kong) Katherine Ip (Hungary) Szabina Szlavikovics	7^{8}	3	[10]
(Italy) Beatrice Lombardo (Italy) Jasmine Paolini	2	1
2	(Croatia) Ana Konjuh (Germany) Antonia Lottner	6	6

Second round
(Japan) M Adachi (Japan) H Yamamoto	6	6
(United Kingdom) H Dart (Croatia) J Fett	4	2
(Czech Republic) M Bouzková (Slovakia) K Schmiedlová	3	3
3	(Switzerland) B Bencic (Spain) S Sorribes Tormo	6	6
7	(Italy) A Matteucci (Serbia) N Stojanović	6	6
WC	(United States) TA Black (United States) P Porter	4	1
(Hong Kong) K Ip (Hungary) Sz Szlavikovics	2	2
2	(Croatia) A Konjuh (Germany) A Lottner	6	6

Quarterfinals
(Japan) M Adachi (Japan) H Yamamoto	1	0
3	(Switzerland) B Bencic (Spain) S Sorribes Tormo	6	6
7	(Italy) A Matteucci (Serbia) N Stojanović	6	5	9
2	(Croatia) A Konjuh (Germany) A Lottner	4	7	[11]

Semifinals
3	(Switzerland) B Bencic (Spain) S Sorribes Tormo	6^{5}	6	[12]
2	(Croatia) A Konjuh (Germany) A Lottner	7^{7}	3	[10]
