= Tornado Alicia Black =

American tennis player

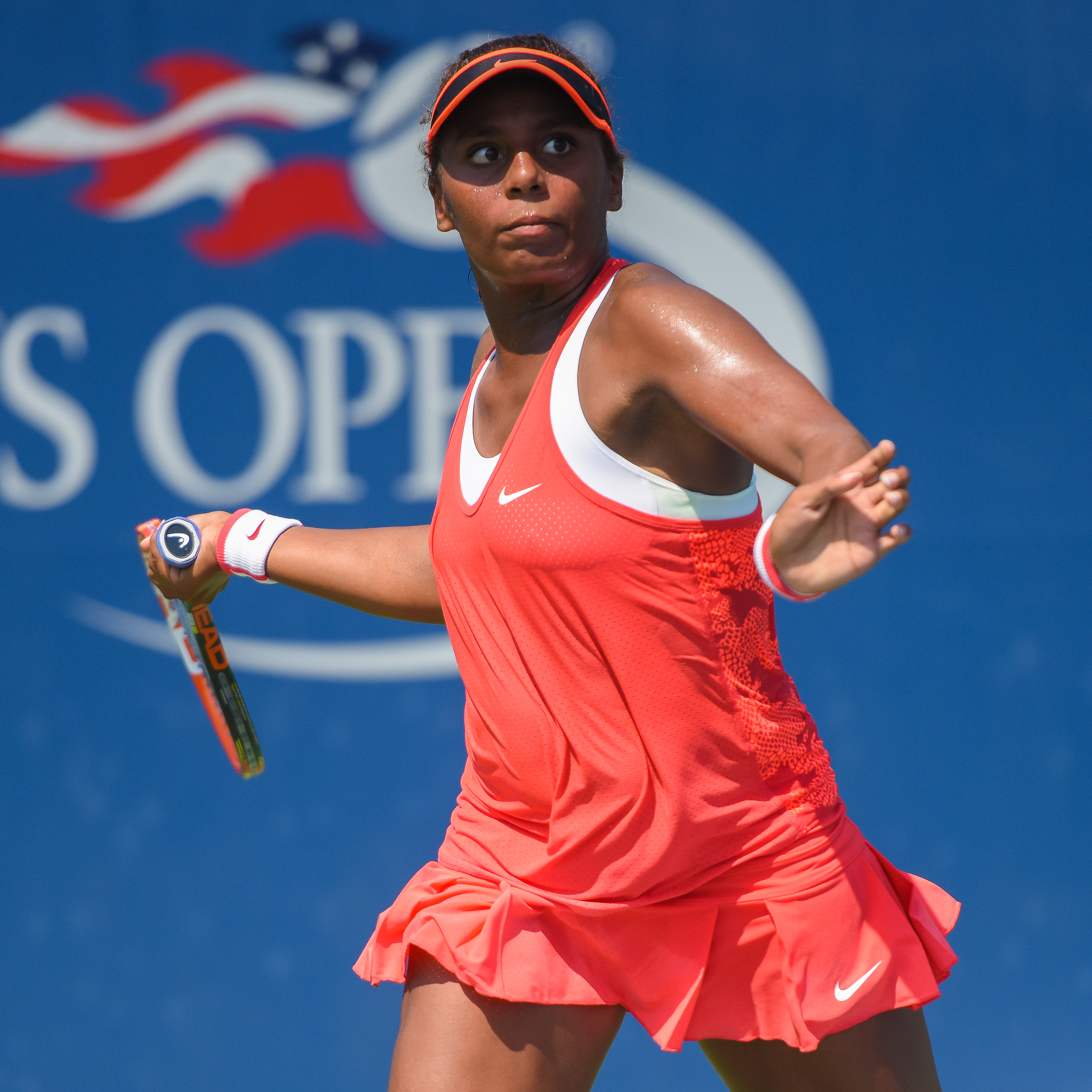
- Black at the 2015 US Open
- Country (sports): United States
- Born: May 12, 1998 (age 28) Boca Raton, Florida
- Prize money: $47,348

Singles
- Career record: 33–17
- Career titles: 2 ITF
- Highest ranking: No. 404 (February 2, 2015)

Grand Slam singles results
- US Open: Q2 (2014)

Doubles
- Career record: 6–6
- Career titles: 0
- Highest ranking: No. 348 (September 14, 2015)

Grand Slam doubles results
- US Open: 2R (2015)

Mixed doubles

Grand Slam mixed doubles results
- US Open: 1R (2014)

Tornado Alicia Black (born May 12, 1998) is an American former tennis player.

She was taught by Rick Macci, a former tennis player. Macci taught many people including Serena and Venus Williams.

Black won two singles titles on the ITF Circuit in her career. On February 2, 2015, she reached her best singles ranking of world No. 404. On September 14, 2015, she peaked at No. 348 in the doubles rankings.

She was runner-up at the 2013 Junior US Open, losing to Ana Konjuh in three sets.

Black made her WTA Tour main-draw debut at the 2014 Abierto Mexicano Telcel. Having been awarded a wildcard, she played Serbian sixth seed Bojana Jovanovski in the first round, losing in straight sets.

Tornado and her younger sister Hurricane Tyra had at one point been referred to as "the next Williams sisters".

In 2017, she was sidelined by a hip injury. Black used GoFundMe to get the $40,000 needed for the hip surgery. Her last match on the circuit so far took place in March 2017.

== ITF Circuit finals ==
=== Singles: 3 (2 titles, 1 runner-up) ===
Legend $25,000 tournaments $10,000 tournaments	Finals by surface Hard (1–0) Clay (1–1)

Result	Date	Tournament	Surface	Opponent	Score
Loss	Jul 2012	ITF Buffalo, United States	Clay	(United States) Jamie Loeb	6–7^{(5)}, 2–6
Win	Sep 2013	ITF Amelia Island, United States	Clay	(United States) Alexandra Mueller	4–6, 6–0, 6–0
Win	Jul 2014	ITF Evansville, United States	Hard	(United States) Caitlin Whoriskey	6–4, 4–6, 6–2

=== Doubles: 1 (runner-up) ===
Legend $25,000 tournaments $10,000 tournaments	Finals by surface Hard (0–1) Clay (0–0)

Result	Date	Tournament	Surface	Partner	Opponents	Score
Loss	Jun 2015	ITF Manzanillo, Mexico	Hard	(United States) Dasha Ivanova	(Mexico) Carolina Betancourt (Samoa) Steffi Carruthers	3–6, 3–6

== Junior Grand Slam tournament finals ==
=== Singles ===
Result	Year	Championship	Surface	Opponent	Score
Loss	2013	US Open	Hard	(Croatia) Ana Konjuh	6–3, 4–6, 6–7^{(6)}
