= 2013 US Open – Men's singles =

Tennis tournament held in 2013

Men's singles
- 2013 US Open

Final
- Champion: (Spain) Rafael Nadal
- Runner-up: (Serbia) Novak Djokovic
- Score: 6–2, 3–6, 6–4, 6–1

Details
- Draw: 128
- Seeds: 32

Events
Singles	men	women		boys	girls
Doubles	men	women	mixed	boys	girls
WC Singles	men	women	quad
WC Doubles	men	women	quad
Legends	men	women	mixed
- US Open

Rafael Nadal defeated Novak Djokovic in the final, 6–2, 3–6, 6–4, 6–1 to win the men's singles tennis title at the 2013 US Open. It was his second US Open title and 13th major title overall, moving him to third place on the all time men's singles major titles list, past Roy Emerson. This marked the third time in four years (following 2010 and 2011) that Nadal and Djokovic contested the final. With the win, Nadal became the third player to win the Summer Slam (having also won Canada and Cincinnati), after Pat Rafter and Andy Roddick.

Andy Murray was the defending champion, but lost in the quarterfinals to Stanislas Wawrinka.

Djokovic and Nadal were in contention for the world No. 1 singles ranking. Djokovic retained the top position by reaching the final.

Roger Federer's streak of nine consecutive US Open quarterfinals ended when he lost to Tommy Robredo in the fourth round. Federer matched Wayne Ferreira's all-time record of 56 consecutive major main draw appearances.

== Seeds ==
1. (Serbia) Novak Djokovic (final)
2. (Spain) Rafael Nadal (champion)
3. (United Kingdom) Andy Murray (quarterfinals)
4. (Spain) David Ferrer (quarterfinals)
5. (Czech Republic) Tomáš Berdych (fourth round)
6. (Argentina) Juan Martín del Potro (second round)
7. (Switzerland) Roger Federer (fourth round)
8. (France) Richard Gasquet (semifinals)
9. (Switzerland) Stan Wawrinka (semifinals)
10. (Canada) Milos Raonic (fourth round)
11. (Japan) Kei Nishikori (first round)
12. (Germany) Tommy Haas (third round)
13. (United States) John Isner (third round)
14. (Poland) Jerzy Janowicz (first round)
15. (Spain) Nicolás Almagro (first round)
16. (Italy) Fabio Fognini (first round)

17. (South Africa) Kevin Anderson (second round)
18. (Serbia) Janko Tipsarević (fourth round)
19. (Spain) Tommy Robredo (quarterfinals)
20. (Italy) Andreas Seppi (third round)
21. (Russia) Mikhail Youzhny (quarterfinals)
22. (Germany) Philipp Kohlschreiber (fourth round)
23. (Spain) Feliciano López (third round)
24. (France) Benoît Paire (first round)
25. (Bulgaria) Grigor Dimitrov (first round)
26. (United States) Sam Querrey (second round)
27. (Spain) Fernando Verdasco (first round)
28. (Argentina) Juan Mónaco (first round, retired)
29. (Austria) Jürgen Melzer (first round)
30. (Latvia) Ernests Gulbis (first round)
31. (France) Julien Benneteau (third round)
32. (Russia) Dmitry Tursunov (third round, retired)

Click on the seed number of a player to go to their draw section.

== Draw ==
Key

- Q = Qualifier
- WC = Wild card
- LL = Lucky loser
- Alt = Alternate
- ITF = ITF entry
- PR = Protected ranking
- SR = Special ranking
- SE = Special exempt
- JE = Junior exempt
- JR = Junior Accelerator Programme entrant
- CO = College Accelerator Programme entrant
- NG = Next Gen Accelerator Program entrant
- w/o = Walkover
- r = Retired
- d = Defaulted

=== Finals ===
Quarterfinals
1	(Serbia) Novak Djokovic	6	6	3	6
21	(Russia) Mikhail Youzhny	3	2	6	0
3	(United Kingdom) Andy Murray	4	3	2
9	(Switzerland) Stan Wawrinka	6	6	6
8	(France) Richard Gasquet	6	6	4	2	6
4	(Spain) David Ferrer	3	1	6	6	3
19	(Spain) Tommy Robredo	0	2	2
2	(Spain) Rafael Nadal	6	6	6

Semifinals
1	(Serbia) Novak Djokovic	2	7^{7}	3	6	6
9	(Switzerland) Stan Wawrinka	6	6^{4}	6	3	4
8	(France) Richard Gasquet	4	6^{1}	2
2	(Spain) Rafael Nadal	6	7^{7}	6

Final
1	(Serbia) Novak Djokovic	2	6	4	1
2	(Spain) Rafael Nadal	6	3	6	6

=== Top half ===
==== Section 1 ====
First round
1	(Serbia) N Djokovic	6	6	6
(Lithuania) R Berankis	1	2	2
(Germany) B Becker	6	3	6	6
(Czech Republic) L Rosol	3	6	3	4
(Poland) Ł Kubot	5	5	2
(Finland) J Nieminen	7	7	6
(Portugal) J Sousa	3	6	6	5	6
25	(Bulgaria) G Dimitrov	6	3	4	7	2
24	(France) B Paire	5	6	4	7	6^{5}
(Russia) A Bogomolov Jr.	7	2	6	5	7^{7}
WC	(United States) T Smyczek	3	6	6	6
WC	(Australia) J Duckworth	6	2	4	1
PR	(Estonia) J Zopp	1	6	6	3	4
(Spain) M Granollers	6	3	1	6	6
(United States) R Ram	6	6	6
16	(Italy) F Fognini	1	2	2

Second round
1	(Serbia) N Djokovic	7^{7}	6	6
(Germany) B Becker	6^{2}	2	2
(Finland) J Nieminen	6	3	6	3	4
(Portugal) J Sousa	1	6	3	6	6
(Russia) A Bogomolov Jr.	6	6^{6}	6	4	4
WC	(United States) T Smyczek	3	7^{8}	2	6	6
(Spain) M Granollers	3	4	6	6	7
(United States) R Ram	6	6	2	3	5

Third round
1	(Serbia) N Djokovic	6	6	6
(Portugal) J Sousa	0	2	2
WC	(United States) T Smyczek	4	6	6	3	5
(Spain) M Granollers	6	4	0	6	7

Fourth round
1	(Serbia) N Djokovic	6	6	6
(Spain) M Granollers	3	0	0

==== Section 2 ====
First round
12	(Germany) T Haas	6	6	6
(France) P-H Mathieu	4	4	1
(Chinese Taipei) Y-h Lu	6	7^{7}	6
(Spain) D Gimeno Traver	4	6^{5}	3
(Belgium) D Goffin	2	4	4
(Ukraine) A Dolgopolov	6	6	6
(France) N Mahut	4	4	6^{4}
21	(Russia) M Youzhny	6	6	7^{7}
29	(Austria) J Melzer	5	3	6^{3}
(Russia) E Donskoy	7	6	7^{7}
(Netherlands) I Sijsling	6^{7}	6	4	1
Q	(Germany) P Gojowczyk	7^{9}	2	6	6
(Australia) L Hewitt	6	4	6	6
WC	(United States) B Baker	3	6	3	4
(Spain) G García López	3	7^{7}	4	6^{7}
6	(Argentina) JM del Potro	6	6^{5}	6	7^{9}

Second round
12	(Germany) T Haas	6	6	7^{7}
(Chinese Taipei) Y-h Lu	3	4	6^{3}
(Ukraine) A Dolgopolov	5	1	3
21	(Russia) M Youzhny	7	6	6
(Russia) E Donskoy	6	6	3	4	6
Q	(Germany) P Gojowczyk	3	4	6	6	3
(Australia) L Hewitt	6	5	3	7^{7}	6
6	(Argentina) JM del Potro	4	7	6	6^{2}	1

Third round
12	(Germany) T Haas	3	2	6	3
21	(Russia) M Youzhny	6	6	2	6
(Russia) E Donskoy	3	6^{5}	6	1
(Australia) L Hewitt	6	7^{7}	3	6

Fourth round
21	(Russia) M Youzhny	6	3	6^{3}	6	7
(Australia) L Hewitt	3	6	7^{7}	4	5

==== Section 3 ====
First round
3	(United Kingdom) A Murray	6	6	6
(France) M Llodra	2	4	3
(Romania) V Hănescu	6^{4}	4	6	6^{4}
(Argentina) L Mayer	7^{7}	6	3	7^{7}
Q	(United States) D Young	6	6	6
(Slovakia) M Kližan	1	0	1
(Germany) F Mayer	6	6	3
28	(Argentina) J Mónaco	4	2	0^{r}
20	(Italy) A Seppi	6	3	7	7
(Belgium) X Malisse	3	6	5	5
(Slovakia) L Lacko	6	1	2	6	4
Q	(India) S Devvarman	4	6	6	4	6
(Germany) T Kamke	6^{4}	6	7^{9}	6
(United States) S Johnson	7^{7}	4	6^{7}	2
(Uzbekistan) D Istomin	6	6	4	6
15	(Spain) N Almagro	3	1	6	3

Second round
3	(United Kingdom) A Murray	7	6	3	6
(Argentina) L Mayer	5	1	6	1
Q	(United States) D Young	5	3	4
(Germany) F Mayer	7	6	6
20	(Italy) A Seppi	7^{10}	6	7
Q	(India) S Devvarman	6^{8}	4	5
(Germany) T Kamke	4	2	2
(Uzbekistan) D Istomin	6	6	6

Third round
3	(United Kingdom) A Murray	7^{7}	6	6
(Germany) F Mayer	6^{2}	2	2
20	(Italy) A Seppi	3	4	6	6	1
(Uzbekistan) D Istomin	6	6	2	3	6

Fourth round
3	(United Kingdom) A Murray	6^{5}	6	6	6
(Uzbekistan) D Istomin	7^{7}	1	4	4

==== Section 4 ====
First round
9	(Switzerland) S Wawrinka	7^{7}	6	6
(Czech Republic) R Štěpánek	6^{2}	3	2
(United States) J Blake	7^{7}	6	4	6^{2}	6^{2}
Q	(Croatia) I Karlović	6^{2}	3	6	7^{7}	7^{7}
(Cyprus) M Baghdatis	6	6	6
Q	(Japan) G Soeda	4	3	1
(Germany) D Brands	5	6	2	3
17	(South Africa) K Anderson	7	4	6	6
31	(France) J Benneteau	6	5	6	6
(Poland) M Przysiężny	4	7	4	4
(Ukraine) S Stakhovsky	4	6	2	6	4
(France) J Chardy	6	4	6	4	6
(Czech Republic) J Veselý	2	2	7^{8}	5
(United States) D Kudla	6	6	6^{6}	7
(Italy) P Lorenzi	1	4	1
5	(Czech Republic) T Berdych	6	6	6

Second round
9	(Switzerland) S Wawrinka	7	7^{10}	6
Q	(Croatia) I Karlović	5	6^{8}	4
(Cyprus) M Baghdatis	6	6	6
17	(South Africa) K Anderson	2	2	2
31	(France) J Benneteau	6	6	6
(France) J Chardy	4	3	4
(United States) D Kudla	6^{3}	6^{3}	3
5	(Czech Republic) T Berdych	7^{7}	7^{7}	6

Third round
9	(Switzerland) S Wawrinka	6	6	6^{1}	7^{9}
(Cyprus) M Baghdatis	3	2	7^{7}	6^{7}
31	(France) J Benneteau	0	3	2
5	(Czech Republic) T Berdych	6	6	6

Fourth round
9	(Switzerland) S Wawrinka	3	6	7^{8}	6
5	(Czech Republic) T Berdych	6	1	6^{6}	2

=== Bottom half ===
==== Section 5 ====
First round
8	(France) R Gasquet	6	6	6
(United States) M Russell	3	4	2
Q	(France) S Robert	6	6	6
Q	(France) A Olivetti	3	3	4
(Germany) J-L Struff	6^{4}	3	6	6	1
WC	(France) G Rufin	7^{7}	6	2	2	6
(Slovenia) A Bedene	5	6	3	0
32	(Russia) D Tursunov	7	4	6	6
23	(Spain) F López	6^{4}	6	6	6
Q	(France) F Serra	7^{7}	2	3	3
(France) K de Schepper	7^{7}	2	6^{0}	6^{4}
WC	(United States) B Klahn	6^{5}	6	7^{7}	7^{7}
(Spain) P Andújar	6	6	6
(Netherlands) T de Bakker	4	4	4
Q	(Italy) T Fabbiano	3	6^{6}	3
10	(Canada) M Raonic	6	7^{8}	6

Second round
8	(France) R Gasquet	6	7	7
Q	(France) S Robert	3	5	5
WC	(France) G Rufin	6^{4}	1^{r}
32	(Russia) D Tursunov	7^{7}	1
23	(Spain) F López	6	7^{7}	4	7
WC	(United States) B Klahn	4	6^{4}	6	5
(Spain) P Andújar	1	2	4
10	(Canada) M Raonic	6	6	6

Third round
8	(France) R Gasquet	6	2	6	4
32	(Russia) D Tursunov	3	6	4	2^{r}
23	(Spain) F López	7^{7}	4	3	4
10	(Canada) M Raonic	6^{4}	6	6	6

Fourth round
8	(France) R Gasquet	6^{4}	7^{7}	2	7^{11}	7
10	(Canada) M Raonic	7^{7}	6^{4}	6	6^{9}	5

==== Section 6 ====
First round
14	(Poland) J Janowicz	4	4	2
Q	(Argentina) M González	6	6	6
(United States) J Sock	7^{7}	3	5
Q	(Germany) P Petzschner	6^{2}	6	2^{r}
(Russia) A Kuznetsov	6^{2}	3	7^{7}	7	4
(Israel) D Sela	7^{7}	6	6^{2}	5	6
PR	(Uruguay) P Cuevas	3	7^{7}	3	0^{r}
18	(Serbia) J Tipsarević	6	6^{5}	6	0
30	(Latvia) E Gulbis	6	3	6	6^{4}	4
(Austria) A Haider-Maurer	3	6	1	7^{7}	6
Q	(Kazakhstan) M Kukushkin	6	7^{7}	7
LL	(Slovakia) A Martin	4	6^{2}	5
(Spain) R Bautista Agut	6	6	6
(Brazil) T Bellucci	3	2	2
Q	(Australia) N Kyrgios	5	3	2
4	(Spain) D Ferrer	7	6	6

Second round
Q	(Argentina) M González	6^{3}	6	5	2
(United States) J Sock	7^{7}	1	7	6
(Israel) D Sela	4	4	1
18	(Serbia) J Tipsarević	6	6	6
(Austria) A Haider-Maurer	4	4	5
Q	(Kazakhstan) M Kukushkin	6	6	7
(Spain) R Bautista Agut	3	7^{7}	1	2
4	(Spain) D Ferrer	6	6^{5}	6	6

Third round
(United States) J Sock	6	6^{1}	1	2
18	(Serbia) J Tipsarević	3	7^{7}	6	6
Q	(Kazakhstan) M Kukushkin	4	3	6	4
4	(Spain) D Ferrer	6	6	4	6

Fourth round
18	(Serbia) J Tipsarević	6^{2}	6	5	6^{3}
4	(Spain) D Ferrer	7^{7}	3	7	7^{7}

==== Section 7 ====
First round
7	(Switzerland) R Federer	6	6	7
(Slovenia) G Žemlja	3	2	5
(Colombia) S Giraldo	3	6	7^{8}	4	2
(Argentina) C Berlocq	6	3	6^{6}	6	6
(Argentina) H Zeballos	6	4	2	1
(France) A Mannarino	4	6	6	6
(Argentina) G Pella	6^{3}	6	1	2
26	(United States) S Querrey	7^{7}	4	6	6
19	(Spain) T Robredo	6	6^{6}	6	6
(Australia) M Matosevic	3	7^{8}	3	2
(Netherlands) R Haase	6^{5}	6	5	6^{3}
Q	(Canada) F Dancevic	7^{7}	3	7	7^{7}
(Spain) A Ramos	3	6	6	6^{1}	3
(Australia) B Tomic	6	3	4	7^{7}	6
Q	(United Kingdom) D Evans	6	6	6
11	(Japan) K Nishikori	4	4	2

Second round
7	(Switzerland) R Federer	6	6	6
(Argentina) C Berlocq	3	2	1
(France) A Mannarino	7^{7}	7^{7}	6^{5}	6
26	(United States) S Querrey	6^{4}	6^{5}	7^{7}	4
19	(Spain) T Robredo	6	6	6
Q	(Canada) F Dancevic	4	4	1
(Australia) B Tomic	6	3	6^{4}	3
Q	(United Kingdom) D Evans	1	6	7^{7}	6

Third round
7	(Switzerland) R Federer	6	6	6
(France) A Mannarino	3	0	2
19	(Spain) T Robredo	7^{8}	6	4	7
Q	(United Kingdom) D Evans	6^{6}	1	6	5

Fourth round
7	(Switzerland) R Federer	6^{3}	3	4
19	(Spain) T Robredo	7^{7}	6	6

==== Section 8 ====
First round
13	(United States) J Isner	6	6	6
(Italy) F Volandri	0	2	3
(Romania) A Ungur	1	2	0
(France) G Monfils	6	6	6
(Spain) A Montañés	3	2	4
(France) É Roger-Vasselin	6	6	6
WC	(United States) C Altamirano	1	3	1
22	(Germany) P Kohlschreiber	6	6	6
27	(Spain) F Verdasco	3	5	6	6	3
(Croatia) I Dodig	6	7	1	4	6
WC	(United States) R Williams	3	6	6	5	0
(Russia) N Davydenko	6	4	1	7	6
Q	(Brazil) R Dutra da Silva	4	3	7^{11}	6	7^{12}
(Canada) V Pospisil	6	6	6^{9}	2	6^{10}
WC	(United States) R Harrison	4	2	2
2	(Spain) R Nadal	6	6	6

Second round
13	(United States) J Isner	7	6	4	7^{7}
(France) G Monfils	5	2	6	6^{4}
(France) É Roger-Vasselin	3	2	7	2
22	(Germany) P Kohlschreiber	6	6	5	6
(Croatia) I Dodig	6	6	6
(Russia) N Davydenko	1	4	4
Q	(Brazil) R Dutra da Silva	2	1	0
2	(Spain) R Nadal	6	6	6

Third round
13	(United States) J Isner	4	6	5	6^{5}
22	(Germany) P Kohlschreiber	6	3	7	7^{7}
(Croatia) I Dodig	4	3	3
2	(Spain) R Nadal	6	6	6

Fourth round
22	(Germany) P Kohlschreiber	7^{7}	4	3	1
2	(Spain) R Nadal	6^{4}	6	6	6

Preceded by 2013 Wimbledon Championships – Men's singles	Grand Slam men's singles	Succeeded by 2014 Australian Open – Men's singles
