= 2013 US Open – Girls' singles =

Girls' singles
- 2013 US Open

Final
- Champion: (Croatia) Ana Konjuh
- Runner-up: (United States) Tornado Alicia Black
- Score: 3–6, 6–4, 7–6^{(8–6)}

Events
Singles	men	women		boys	girls
Doubles	men	women	mixed	boys	girls
WC Singles	men	women	quad
WC Doubles	men	women	quad
Legends	men	women	mixed
- US Open

Samantha Crawford was the defending champion having won the 2012 event, but chose not to compete in 2013.

Ana Konjuh won the tournament, defeating Tornado Alicia Black in the final, 3–6, 6–4, 7–6^{(8–6)}.

== Seeds ==
1. (Switzerland) Belinda Bencic (quarterfinals)
2. (Croatia) Ana Konjuh (champion)
3. (Czech Republic) Kateřina Siniaková (quarterfinals)
4. (Czech Republic) Barbora Krejčíková (second round)
5. (Russia) Darya Kasatkina (second round)
6. (United States) ~~Taylor Townsend~~ (withdrew)
7. (Germany) Antonia Lottner (semifinals)
8. (Belgium) Elise Mertens (second round)
9. (Russia) Varvara Flink (first round)
10. (United States) Louisa Chirico (quarterfinals)
11. (Japan) Mayo Hibi (semifinals)
12. (Paraguay) Camila Giangreco Campiz (third round)
13. (United Kingdom) Katy Dunne (second round)
14. (Ukraine) Anhelina Kalinina (third round)
15. (Turkey) İpek Soylu (first round)
16. (Chinese Taipei) Hsu Ching-wen (first round)
17. (Serbia) Nina Stojanović (first round)

== Main draw ==
Key

- Q = Qualifier
- WC = Wild card
- LL = Lucky loser
- Alt = Alternate
- ITF = ITF entry
- PR = Protected ranking
- SR = Special ranking
- SE = Special exempt
- JE = Junior exempt
- JR = Junior Accelerator Programme entrant
- CO = College Accelerator Programme entrant
- NG = Next Gen Accelerator Program entrant
- w/o = Walkover
- r = Retired
- d = Defaulted

=== Finals ===
Quarterfinals
1	(Switzerland) Belinda Bencic	4	2
7	(Germany) Antonia Lottner	6	6
WC	(United States) Tornado Alicia Black	7^{7}	6
(Belarus) Iryna Shymanovich	6^{3}	4
11	(Japan) Mayo Hibi	6	7
3	(Czech Republic) Kateřina Siniaková	2	5
10	(United States) Louisa Chirico	3	2
2	(Croatia) Ana Konjuh	6	6

Semifinals
7	(Germany) Antonia Lottner	5	3
WC	(United States) Tornado Alicia Black	7	6
11	(Japan) Mayo Hibi	3	3
2	(Croatia) Ana Konjuh	6	6

Final
WC	(United States) Tornado Alicia Black	6	4	6^{6}
2	(Croatia) Ana Konjuh	3	6	7^{8}

=== Top half ===
==== Section 1 ====
First round
1	(Switzerland) Belinda Bencic	6	6
Q	(United States) Raveena Kingsley	2	4
(Egypt) Sandra Samir	7^{7}	3	6
Q	(Australia) Naiktha Bains	6^{1}	6	4
(Slovakia) Kristína Schmiedlová	5	7	6^{2}
WC	(United States) Brooke Austin	7	5	7^{7}
(Czech Republic) Marie Bouzková	2	4
14	(Ukraine) Anhelina Kalinina	6	6
12	(Paraguay) Camila Giangreco Campiz	6	4	6
(United States) Johnnise Renaud	4	6	4
(Russia) Veronika Kudermetova	3	3
Q	(China) Sun Ziyue	6	6
WC	(United States) Katerina Stewart	6	6
(Japan) Ayaka Okuno	1	3
(France) Margot Yerolymos	6^{4}	1
7	(Germany) Antonia Lottner	7^{7}	6

Second round
1	(Switzerland) B Bencic	6	6
(Egypt) S Samir	2	2
WC	(United States) B Austin	1	6	3
14	(Ukraine) A Kalinina	6	4	6
12	(Paraguay) C Giangreco Campiz	6	6
Q	(China) Z Sun	4	4
WC	(United States) K Stewart	3	4
7	(Germany) A Lottner	6	6

Third round
1	(Switzerland) B Bencic	6	7
14	(Ukraine) A Kalinina	2	5
12	(Paraguay) C Giangreco Campiz	6^{6}	5
7	(Germany) A Lottner	7^{8}	7

Quarterfinals
1	(Switzerland) B Bencic	4	2
7	(Germany) A Lottner	6	6

==== Section 2 ====
First round
4	(Czech Republic) Barbora Krejčíková	6	6
(Japan) Hikari Yamamoto	3	2
WC	(United States) Tornado Alicia Black	6	6
LL	(Italy) Beatrice Lombardo	0	1
Q	(Italy) Jasmine Paolini	6	3	6
(Mexico) Victoria Rodríguez	0	6	3
WC	(United States) Chloe Michele Ouelette-Pizer	3	1
13	(United Kingdom) Katy Dunne	6	6
9	(Russia) Varvara Flink	3	3
(Belarus) Iryna Shymanovich	6	6
Q	(Hungary) Szabina Szlavikovics	0	4
WC	(United States) Peggy Porter	6	6
(Croatia) Jana Fett	3	1
(Spain) Sara Sorribes Tormo	6	6
(Canada) Françoise Abanda	2	7^{7}	6
17	(Serbia) Nina Stojanović	6	6^{5}	0

Second round
4	(Czech Republic) B Krejčíková	5	5
WC	(United States) TA Black	7	7
Q	(Italy) J Paolini	6	7^{8}
13	(United Kingdom) K Dunne	4	6^{6}
(Belarus) I Shymanovich	6	6
WC	(United States) P Porter	3	2
(Spain) S Sorribes Tormo	6	6
(Canada) F Abanda	3	3

Third round
WC	(United States) TA Black	6	6
Q	(Italy) J Paolini	3	3
(Belarus) I Shymanovich	6	6
(Spain) S Sorribes Tormo	1	2

Quarterfinals
WC	(United States) TA Black	7^{7}	6
(Belarus) I Shymanovich	6^{3}	4

=== Bottom half ===
==== Section 3 ====
First round
8	(Belgium) Elise Mertens	6	6
(Russia) Alina Silich	2	3
Q	(United States) Usue Maitane Arconada	1	2
(United Kingdom) Katie Boulter	6	6
(United States) Jamie Loeb	6	4	1
(Serbia) Ivana Jorović	4	6	6
(Australia) Sara Tomic	1	3
11	(Japan) Mayo Hibi	6	6
15	(Turkey) İpek Soylu	6	6^{3}	2
(United States) Christina Makarova	2	7^{7}	6
(Italy) Alice Matteucci	4	2
(Russia) Maria Marfutina	6	6
(Thailand) Kamonwan Buayam	1	5
Q	(United States) Claire Liu	6	7
(Mexico) Alejandra Cisneros	6^{1}	3
3	(Czech Republic) Kateřina Siniaková	7^{7}	6

Second round
8	(Belgium) E Mertens	3	2
(United Kingdom) K Boulter	6	6
(Serbia) I Jorović	1	4
11	(Japan) M Hibi	6	6
(United States) C Makarova	6^{6}	0^{r}
(Russia) M Marfutina	7^{8}	3
Q	(United States) C Liu	2	3
3	(Czech Republic) K Siniaková	6	6

Third round
(United Kingdom) K Boulter	1	0
11	(Japan) M Hibi	6	6
(Russia) M Marfutina	1	2
3	(Czech Republic) K Siniaková	6	6

Quarterfinals
11	(Japan) M Hibi	6	7
3	(Czech Republic) K Siniaková	2	5

==== Section 4 ====
First round
5	(Russia) Darya Kasatkina	6	6
Q	(Mexico) Cassandra Vázquez	4	1
(Hong Kong) Katherine Ip	3	2
WC	(United States) Michaela Gordon	6	6
(Ukraine) Viktoriya Lushkova	6	6
(Brazil) Carolina Alves	4	1
(United Kingdom) Harriet Dart	1	3
10	(United States) Louisa Chirico	6	6
16	(Chinese Taipei) Hsu Ching-wen	0	1
(Romania) Ioana Ducu	6	6
(China) Xu Shilin	5	7^{7}	0
WC	(United States) CiCi Bellis	7	6^{2}	6
(France) Fiona Ferro	7	6^{6}	2
WC	(United States) Kaitlyn McCarthy	5	7^{8}	6
(Latvia) Jeļena Ostapenko	7	4	4
2	(Croatia) Ana Konjuh	5	6	6

Second round
5	(Russia) D Kasatkina	4	3
WC	(United States) M Gordon	6	6
(Ukraine) V Lushkova	3	4
10	(United States) L Chirico	6	6
(Romania) I Ducu	2	2
WC	(United States) C Bellis	6	6
WC	(United States) K McCarthy	3	5
2	(Croatia) A Konjuh	6	7

Third round
WC	(United States) M Gordon	7^{7}	5	2
10	(United States) L Chirico	6^{2}	7	6
WC	(United States) C Bellis	3	3
2	(Croatia) A Konjuh	6	6

Quarterfinals
10	(United States) L Chirico	3	2
2	(Croatia) A Konjuh	6	6
