= 2013 US Open – Wheelchair quad doubles =

Wheelchair quad doubles
- 2013 US Open

Final
- Champions: (United States) David Wagner (United States) Nick Taylor
- Runners-up: (United Kingdom) Andrew Lapthorne (South Africa) Lucas Sithole
- Score: 6–0, 2–6, 6–3

Events
Singles	men	women		boys	girls
Doubles	men	women	mixed	boys	girls
WC Singles	men	women	quad
WC Doubles	men	women	quad
Legends	men	women	mixed
← 2011 ·	US Open	· 2014 →

Four-time defending champions David Wagner and Nick Taylor defeated Andrew Lapthorne and Lucas Sithole in the final, 6–0, 2–6, 6–3 to win the quad doubles wheelchair tennis title at the 2013 US Open.

The event was not held in 2012 due to a scheduling conflict with the 2012 Summer Paralympics.

== Main draw ==
=== Key ===
- Q = Qualifier
- WC = Wild card
- LL = Lucky loser
- Alt = Alternate
- SE = Special exempt
- PR = Protected ranking
- ITF = ITF entry
- JE = Junior exempt
- w/o = Walkover
- r = Retired
- d = Defaulted
- SR = Special ranking

=== Final ===
Finals
(United States) David Wagner (United States) Nick Taylor	6	2	6
(United Kingdom) Andrew Lapthorne (South Africa) Lucas Sithole	0	6	3
