= 2013 US Open – Women's doubles =

Women's doubles
- 2013 US Open

Final
- Champions: (Czech Republic) Andrea Hlaváčková (Czech Republic) Lucie Hradecká
- Runners-up: (Australia) Ashleigh Barty (Australia) Casey Dellacqua
- Score: 6–7^{(4–7)}, 6–1, 6–4

Details
- Draw: 64 (7 WC )
- Seeds: 16

Events
Singles	men	women		boys	girls
Doubles	men	women	mixed	boys	girls
WC Singles	men	women	quad
WC Doubles	men	women	quad
Legends	men	women	mixed
← 2012 ·	US Open	· 2014 →

Sara Errani and Roberta Vinci were the defending champions, but lost to Serena and Venus Williams in the quarterfinals.
Andrea Hlaváčková and Lucie Hradecká won the title, defeating Ashleigh Barty and Casey Dellacqua in the final, 6–7^{(4–7)}, 6–1, 6–4.

== Seeds ==
1. (Italy) Sara Errani / (Italy) Roberta Vinci (quarterfinals)
2. (Russia) Ekaterina Makarova / (Russia) Elena Vesnina (quarterfinals)
3. (Russia) Nadia Petrova / (Slovenia) Katarina Srebotnik (quarterfinals)
4. (Chinese Taipei) Hsieh Su-wei / (China) Peng Shuai (quarterfinals)
5. (Czech Republic) Andrea Hlaváčková / (Czech Republic) Lucie Hradecká (champions)
6. (Germany) Anna-Lena Grönefeld / (Czech Republic) Květa Peschke (third round)
7. (United States) Raquel Kops-Jones / (United States) Abigail Spears (second round)
8. (Australia) Ashleigh Barty / (Australia) Casey Dellacqua (final)
9. (United States) Liezel Huber / (Spain) Nuria Llagostera Vives (third round)
10. (India) Sania Mirza / (China) Zheng Jie (semifinals)
11. (Russia) Anastasia Pavlyuchenkova / (Czech Republic) Lucie Šafářová (third round)
12. (Germany) Julia Görges / (Czech Republic) Barbora Záhlavová-Strýcová (second round)
13. (Zimbabwe) Cara Black / (New Zealand) Marina Erakovic (third round)
14. (France) Kristina Mladenovic / (Kazakhstan) Galina Voskoboeva (third round)
15. (Serbia) Jelena Janković / (Croatia) Mirjana Lučić-Baroni (third round)
16. (Spain) Anabel Medina Garrigues / (Italy) Flavia Pennetta (third round)

== Draw ==
=== Key ===
- Q = Qualifier
- WC = Wild card
- LL = Lucky loser
- Alt = Alternate
- ITF = ITF entry
- PR = Protected ranking
- SR = Special ranking
- SE = Special exempt
- JE = Junior exempt
- JR = Junior Accelerator Programme entrant
- CO = College Accelerator Programme entrant
- NG = Next Gen Accelerator Program entrant
- w/o = Walkover
- r = Retired
- d = Defaulted

=== Finals ===
Quarterfinals
1	(Italy) Sara Errani (Italy) Roberta Vinci	3	1
(United States) Serena Williams (United States) Venus Williams	6	6
3	(Russia) Nadia Petrova (Slovenia) Katarina Srebotnik	6	4	5
5	(Czech Republic) Andrea Hlaváčková (Czech Republic) Lucie Hradecká	4	6	7
10	(India) Sania Mirza (China) Zheng Jie	6	7^{7}
4	(Chinese Taipei) Hsieh Su-wei (China) Peng Shuai	4	6^{5}
8	(Australia) Ashleigh Barty (Australia) Casey Dellacqua	6	6
2	(Russia) Ekaterina Makarova (Russia) Elena Vesnina	2	3

Semifinals
(United States) Serena Williams (United States) Venus Williams	4	2
5	(Czech Republic) Andrea Hlaváčková (Czech Republic) Lucie Hradecká	6	6
10	(India) Sania Mirza (China) Zheng Jie	2	2
8	(Australia) Ashleigh Barty (Australia) Casey Dellacqua	6	6

Final
5	(Czech Republic) Andrea Hlaváčková (Czech Republic) Lucie Hradecká	6^{4}	6	6
8	(Australia) Ashleigh Barty (Australia) Casey Dellacqua	7^{7}	1	4

=== Top half ===
==== Section 1 ====
First round
1	(Italy) S Errani (Italy) R Vinci	6	7
WC	(Slovakia) D Hantuchová (Switzerland) M Hingis	3	5
(Kazakhstan) Y Shvedova (China) S Zhang	5	3
(Russia) A Kudryavtseva (Australia) A Rodionova	7	6
(Canada) S Fichman (Canada) A Wozniak	7	4	6
WC	(United States) A Kiick (United States) S Vickery	5	6	1
(Russia) A Kleybanova (United States) C McHale	4	4
16	(Spain) A Medina Garrigues (Italy) F Pennetta	6	6
11	(Russia) A Pavlyuchenkova (Czech Republic) L Šafářová	6	6
(Slovakia) D Cibulková (Romania) M Niculescu	2	1
(Romania) A Cadanțu (Romania) S Halep	6	6^{4}	4
WC	(United States) J Craybas (United States) C Vandeweghe	2	7^{7}	6
(Spain) S Soler Espinosa (Spain) C Suárez Navarro	7^{7}	0	3
(United States) S Williams (United States) V Williams	6^{5}	6	6
(South Africa) N Grandin (Croatia) D Jurak	1	3
7	(United States) R Kops-Jones (United States) A Spears	6	6

Second round
1	(Italy) S Errani (Italy) R Vinci	6	6
(Russia) A Kudryavtseva (Australia) A Rodionova	3	2
(Canada) S Fichman (Canada) A Wozniak	2	4
16	(Spain) A Medina Garrigues (Italy) F Pennetta	6	6
11	(Russia) A Pavlyuchenkova (Czech Republic) L Šafářová	7^{8}	6
WC	(United States) J Craybas (United States) C Vandeweghe	6^{6}	4
(United States) S Williams (United States) V Williams	6	6
7	(United States) R Kops-Jones (United States) A Spears	4	4

Third round
1	(Italy) S Errani (Italy) R Vinci	6	7
16	(Spain) A Medina Garrigues (Italy) F Pennetta	1	5
11	(Russia) A Pavlyuchenkova (Czech Republic) L Šafářová	1	6^{3}
(United States) S Williams (United States) V Williams	6	7^{7}

Quarterfinals
1	(Italy) S Errani (Italy) R Vinci	3	1
(United States) S Williams (United States) V Williams	6	6

==== Section 2 ====
First round
3	(Russia) N Petrova (Slovenia) K Srebotnik	6	6
(Ukraine) E Svitolina (Czech Republic) R Voráčová	2	4
(United States) V King (Slovakia) M Rybáriková	6	6
(Czech Republic) Ka Plíšková (Croatia) D Vekić	1	0
(Netherlands) K Bertens (Sweden) J Larsson	7	6
WC	(United States) S Rogers (United States) M Sanchez	5	4
(Czech Republic) E Birnerová (Switzerland) S Vögele	2	5
14	(France) K Mladenovic (Kazakhstan) G Voskoboeva	6	7
12	(Germany) J Görges (Czech Republic) B Záhlavová-Strýcová	6	3	6
(Belarus) O Govortsova (Luxembourg) M Minella	2	6	1
(Croatia) P Martić (Germany) A Petkovic	2	6	4
(Slovenia) P Hercog (United States) L Raymond	6	3	6
(Russia) V Dushevina (United Kingdom) H Watson	1	5
(Austria) S Klemenschits (Slovenia) A Klepač	6	7
(Japan) K Date-Krumm (Spain) A Parra Santonja	0	3
5	(Czech Republic) A Hlaváčková (Czech Republic) L Hradecká	6	6

Second round
3	(Russia) N Petrova (Slovenia) K Srebotnik	6	3	6
(United States) V King (Slovakia) M Rybáriková	3	6	1
(Netherlands) K Bertens (Sweden) J Larsson	5	6^{9}
14	(France) K Mladenovic (Kazakhstan) G Voskoboeva	7	7^{11}
12	(Germany) J Görges (Czech Republic) B Záhlavová-Strýcová	7	4	5
(Slovenia) P Hercog (United States) L Raymond	5	6	7
(Austria) S Klemenschits (Slovenia) A Klepač	5	3
5	(Czech Republic) A Hlaváčková (Czech Republic) L Hradecká	7	6

Third round
3	(Russia) N Petrova (Slovenia) K Srebotnik	4	6	6
14	(France) K Mladenovic (Kazakhstan) G Voskoboeva	6	2	3
(Slovenia) P Hercog (United States) L Raymond	3	6^{4}
5	(Czech Republic) A Hlaváčková (Czech Republic) L Hradecká	6	7^{7}

Quarterfinals
3	(Russia) N Petrova (Slovenia) K Srebotnik	6	4	5
5	(Czech Republic) A Hlaváčková (Czech Republic) L Hradecká	4	6	7

=== Bottom half ===
==== Section 3 ====
First round
6	(Germany) A-L Grönefeld (Czech Republic) K Peschke	3	6	6
(Chinese Taipei) H-c Chan (Chinese Taipei) Y-j Chan	6	2	3
(Georgia (country)) O Kalashnikova (Poland) A Rosolska	6^{5}	2
(Hungary) T Babos (Italy) F Schiavone	7^{7}	6
(Hungary) K Marosi (United States) M Moulton-Levy	6	7^{7}
(Romania) I-C Begu (Czech Republic) K Zakopalová	3	6^{4}
(Germany) A Beck (Puerto Rico) M Puig	2	2
10	(India) S Mirza (China) J Zheng	6	6
15	(Serbia) J Janković (Croatia) M Lučić-Baroni	6	6
(Ukraine) I Buryachok (Italy) K Knapp	2	3
(Germany) M Barthel (Latvia) L Dekmeijere	6	6
(Romania) A Dulgheru (Czech Republic) E Hrdinová	3	4
(Russia) S Kuznetsova (Australia) S Stosur	6	6
(Austria) Y Meusburger (Argentina) P Ormaechea	3	0
(Greece) E Daniilidou (Russia) A Panova	3	4
4	(Chinese Taipei) S-w Hsieh (China) S Peng	6	6

Second round
6	(Germany) A-L Grönefeld (Czech Republic) K Peschke	6	6
(Hungary) T Babos (Italy) F Schiavone	4	4
(Hungary) K Marosi (United States) M Moulton-Levy	3	5
10	(India) S Mirza (China) J Zheng	6	7
15	(Serbia) J Janković (Croatia) M Lučić-Baroni	7^{7}	6
(Germany) M Barthel (Latvia) L Dekmeijere	6^{4}	2
(Russia) S Kuznetsova (Australia) S Stosur	5	6	3
4	(Chinese Taipei) S-w Hsieh (China) S Peng	7	4	6

Third round
6	(Germany) A-L Grönefeld (Czech Republic) K Peschke	2	3
10	(India) S Mirza (China) J Zheng	6	6
15	(Serbia) J Janković (Croatia) M Lučić-Baroni	4	2
4	(Chinese Taipei) S-w Hsieh (China) S Peng	6	6

Quarterfinals
10	(India) S Mirza (China) J Zheng	6	7^{7}
4	(Chinese Taipei) S-w Hsieh (China) S Peng	4	6^{5}

==== Section 4 ====
First round
8	(Australia) A Barty (Australia) C Dellacqua	6	6
(Romania) S Cîrstea (Belgium) Y Wickmayer	4	1
(Czech Republic) P Cetkovská (Belgium) K Flipkens	6	6
(Canada) E Bouchard (Slovakia) J Husárová	2	1
WC	(United States) M Oudin (United States) A Riske	6	6
WC	(United States) L Davis (United States) G Min	2	4
(Russia) N Bratchikova (Serbia) B Jovanovski	1	1
9	(United States) L Huber (Spain) N Llagostera Vives	6	6
13	(Zimbabwe) C Black (New Zealand) M Erakovic	6	7^{7}
(Spain) L Domínguez Lino (Israel) S Pe'er	4	6^{4}
(United States) V Lepchenko (China) S Zheng	6	6
(Sweden) S Arvidsson (Estonia) K Kanepi	3	3
WC	(United States) M Burdette (United States) T Townsend	4	6	1
(France) A Cornet (France) C Garcia	6	1	6
(Japan) S Aoyama (South Africa) C Scheepers	4	1
2	(Russia) E Makarova (Russia) E Vesnina	6	6

Second round
8	(Australia) A Barty (Australia) C Dellacqua	6	6
(Czech Republic) P Cetkovská (Belgium) K Flipkens	3	4
WC	(United States) M Oudin (United States) A Riske	6	6^{6}	1
9	(United States) L Huber (Spain) N Llagostera Vives	3	7^{8}	6
13	(Zimbabwe) C Black (New Zealand) M Erakovic	6	7^{7}
(United States) V Lepchenko (China) S Zheng	1	6^{5}
(France) A Cornet (France) C Garcia	2	2
2	(Russia) E Makarova (Russia) E Vesnina	6	6

Third round
8	(Australia) A Barty (Australia) C Dellacqua	6	6
9	(United States) L Huber (Spain) N Llagostera Vives	4	3
13	(Zimbabwe) C Black (New Zealand) M Erakovic	7	2	4
2	(Russia) E Makarova (Russia) E Vesnina	5	6	6

Quarterfinals
8	(Australia) A Barty (Australia) C Dellacqua	6	6
2	(Russia) E Makarova (Russia) E Vesnina	2	3
