= 2013 US Open – Men's doubles =

Men's doubles
- 2013 US Open

Final
- Champions: (India) Leander Paes (Czech Republic) Radek Štěpánek
- Runners-up: (Austria) Alexander Peya (Brazil) Bruno Soares
- Score: 6–1, 6–3

Details
- Draw: 64
- Seeds: 16

Events
Singles	men	women		boys	girls
Doubles	men	women	mixed	boys	girls
WC Singles	men	women	quad
WC Doubles	men	women	quad
Legends	men	women	mixed
← 2012 ·	US Open	· 2014 →

Bob Bryan and Mike Bryan were the defending champions, but lost in the semifinals to Leander Paes and Radek Štěpánek. The loss ended the Bryan brothers' bid to win a calendar grand slam.

Leander Paes and Radek Štěpánek won the title, defeating Alexander Peya and Bruno Soares in the final, 6–1, 6–3.

== Seeds ==
1. (United States) Bob Bryan / (United States) Mike Bryan (semifinals)
2. (Austria) Alexander Peya / (Brazil) Bruno Soares (final)
3. (Spain) Marcel Granollers / (Spain) Marc López (third round)
4. (India) Leander Paes / (Czech Republic) Radek Štěpánek (champions)
5. (Pakistan) Aisam-ul-Haq Qureshi / (Netherlands) Jean-Julien Rojer (quarterfinals)
6. (India) Rohan Bopanna / (France) Édouard Roger-Vasselin (third round)
7. (France) Julien Benneteau / (Serbia) Nenad Zimonjić (second round)
8. (Poland) Mariusz Fyrstenberg / (Poland) Marcin Matkowski (first round)
9. (Spain) David Marrero / (Spain) Fernando Verdasco (first round)
10. (Croatia) Ivan Dodig / (Brazil) Marcelo Melo (semifinals)
11. (Mexico) Santiago González / (United States) Scott Lipsky (first round)
12. (United Kingdom) Colin Fleming / (United Kingdom) Jonathan Marray (quarterfinals)
13. (Belarus) Max Mirnyi / (Romania) Horia Tecău (first round)
14. (France) Michaël Llodra / (France) Nicolas Mahut (third round)
15. (Czech Republic) František Čermák / (Slovakia) Filip Polášek (first round)
16. (Philippines) Treat Huey / (United Kingdom) Dominic Inglot (quarterfinals)

== Draw ==
=== Key ===
- Q = Qualifier
- WC = Wild card
- LL = Lucky loser
- Alt = Alternate
- ITF = ITF entry
- PR = Protected ranking
- SR = Special ranking
- SE = Special exempt
- JE = Junior exempt
- JR = Junior Accelerator Programme entrant
- CO = College Accelerator Programme entrant
- NG = Next Gen Accelerator Program entrant
- w/o = Walkover
- r = Retired
- d = Defaulted

=== Finals ===
Quarterfinals
1	(United States) Bob Bryan (United States) Mike Bryan	7^{9}	6
12	(United Kingdom) Colin Fleming (United Kingdom) Jonathan Marray	6^{7}	4
4	(India) Leander Paes (Czech Republic) Radek Štěpánek	6	6^{3}	6
5	(Pakistan) Aisam-ul-Haq Qureshi (Netherlands) Jean-Julien Rojer	1	7^{7}	4
10	(Croatia) Ivan Dodig (Brazil) Marcelo Melo	7	6
16	(Philippines) Treat Huey (United Kingdom) Dominic Inglot	5	3
(United Kingdom) Jamie Murray (Australia) John Peers	4	7^{7}	4
2	(Austria) Alexander Peya (Brazil) Bruno Soares	6	6^{4}	6

Semifinals
1	(United States) Bob Bryan (United States) Mike Bryan	6	3	4
4	(India) Leander Paes (Czech Republic) Radek Štěpánek	3	6	6
10	(Croatia) Ivan Dodig (Brazil) Marcelo Melo	5	4
2	(Austria) Alexander Peya (Brazil) Bruno Soares	7	6

Final
4	(India) Leander Paes (Czech Republic) Radek Štěpánek	6	6
2	(Austria) Alexander Peya (Brazil) Bruno Soares	1	3

=== Top half ===
==== Section 1 ====
First round
1	(United States) B Bryan (United States) M Bryan	7^{7}	6
(Argentina) F Delbonis (Argentina) L Mayer	6^{1}	2
(United States) E Butorac (Denmark) F Nielsen	7	6^{5}	6
(Sweden) J Brunström (South Africa) R Klaasen	5	7^{7}	4
(Canada) D Nestor (Canada) V Pospisil	6	7^{7}
(India) M Bhupathi (Germany) P Petzschner	3	6^{4}
(Spain) A Montañés (Spain) T Robredo	6	6
15	(Czech Republic) F Čermák (Slovakia) F Polášek	4	0
12	(United Kingdom) C Fleming (United Kingdom) J Marray	4	6	6
(Argentina) C Berlocq (Argentina) E Schwank	6	3	4
(United States) R Harrison (Sweden) R Lindstedt	7^{8}	7^{10}
WC	(United States) S Johnson (United States) M Russell	6^{6}	6^{8}
(Russia) N Davydenko (Russia) M Elgin	1	6	6
(Australia) M Matosevic (Slovenia) G Žemlja	6	3	2
WC	(United States) B Klahn (United States) S Querrey	2	4
6	(India) R Bopanna (France) É Roger-Vasselin	6	6

Second round
1	(United States) B Bryan (United States) M Bryan	6	6
(United States) E Butorac (Denmark) F Nielsen	3	2
(Canada) D Nestor (Canada) V Pospisil	4	6	6
(Spain) A Montañés (Spain) T Robredo	6	2	1
12	(United Kingdom) C Fleming (United Kingdom) J Marray	6	6
(United States) R Harrison (Sweden) R Lindstedt	3	4
(Russia) N Davydenko (Russia) M Elgin	6^{2}	6^{0}
6	(India) R Bopanna (France) É Roger-Vasselin	7^{7}	7^{7}

Third round
1	(United States) B Bryan (United States) M Bryan	6^{1}	7	6
(Canada) D Nestor (Canada) V Pospisil	7^{7}	5	2
12	(United Kingdom) C Fleming (United Kingdom) J Marray	6	6
6	(India) R Bopanna (France) É Roger-Vasselin	4	4

Quarterfinals
1	(United States) B Bryan (United States) M Bryan	7^{9}	6
12	(United Kingdom) C Fleming (United Kingdom) J Marray	6^{7}	4

==== Section 2 ====
First round
4	(India) L Paes (Czech Republic) R Štěpánek	6	7^{7}
(Finland) J Nieminen (Russia) D Tursunov	4	6^{4}
(France) K de Schepper (Romania) V Hănescu	3	6^{5}
(Germany) D Brands (Austria) P Oswald	6	7^{7}
(Australia) P Hanley (Australia) J-P Smith	6^{10}	6^{4}
(Italy) F Fognini (Spain) A Ramos	7^{12}	7^{7}
WC	(United States) J Jenkins (United States) M Styslinger	3	2
14	(France) M Llodra (France) N Mahut	6	6
11	(Mexico) S González (United States) S Lipsky	2	3
(Israel) J Erlich (Israel) A Ram	6	6
(Netherlands) R Haase (Netherlands) I Sijsling	1	5
(Chinese Taipei) Y-h Lu (India) D Sharan	6	7
(Spain) R Bautista-Agut (Spain) D Gimeno-Traver	4	7	6
(Romania) F Mergea (Czech Republic) L Rosol	6	5	0
(Poland) J Janowicz (Poland) Ł Kubot	6	2	3
5	(Pakistan) A-u-H Qureshi (Netherlands) J-J Rojer	2	6	6

Second round
4	(India) L Paes (Czech Republic) R Štěpánek	4	6	6
(Germany) D Brands (Austria) P Oswald	6	3	4
(Italy) F Fognini (Spain) A Ramos	3	4
14	(France) M Llodra (France) N Mahut	6	6
(Israel) J Erlich (Israel) A Ram	4	7	6^{2}
(Chinese Taipei) Y-h Lu (India) D Sharan	6	5	7^{7}
(Spain) R Bautista-Agut (Spain) D Gimeno-Traver	2	3
5	(Pakistan) A-u-H Qureshi (Netherlands) J-J Rojer	6	6

Third round
4	(India) L Paes (Czech Republic) R Štěpánek	7	4	6
14	(France) M Llodra (France) N Mahut	5	6	3
(Chinese Taipei) Y-h Lu (India) D Sharan	6^{6}	6	3
5	(Pakistan) A-u-H Qureshi (Netherlands) J-J Rojer	7^{8}	3	6

Quarterfinals
4	(India) L Paes (Czech Republic) R Štěpánek	6	6^{3}	6
5	(Pakistan) A-u-H Qureshi (Netherlands) J-J Rojer	1	7^{7}	4

=== Bottom half ===
==== Section 3 ====
First round
8	(Poland) M Fyrstenberg (Poland) M Matkowski	4	4
(Ukraine) S Stakhovsky (Russia) M Youzhny	6	6
(Czech Republic) J Levinský (Czech Republic) J Veselý	6	6
Alt	(Uzbekistan) D Istomin (United Kingdom) K Skupski	3	3
(Germany) A Begemann (Germany) M Emmrich	6	6
WC	(United States) A Kuznetsov (United States) B Reynolds	4	2
(United States) N Monroe (Germany) S Stadler	6^{2}	4
10	(Croatia) I Dodig (Brazil) M Melo	7^{7}	6
16	(Philippines) T Huey (United Kingdom) D Inglot	6	6^{4}	7^{7}
(Austria) J Knowle (Austria) J Melzer	2	7^{7}	6^{5}
(Italy) P Lorenzi (Italy) A Seppi	5	5
(Italy) D Bracciali (Czech Republic) L Dlouhý	7	7
(Australia) C Guccione (Australia) B Tomic	7^{7}	7^{7}
(Colombia) JS Cabal (Colombia) R Farah	6^{2}	6^{5}
(Germany) T Kamke (Germany) F Mayer	7	5	1
3	(Spain) M Granollers (Spain) M López	5	7	6

Second round
(Ukraine) S Stakhovsky (Russia) M Youzhny	6	6
(Czech Republic) J Levinský (Czech Republic) J Veselý	2	4
(Germany) A Begemann (Germany) M Emmrich	6^{5}	3
10	(Croatia) I Dodig (Brazil) M Melo	7^{7}	6
16	(Philippines) T Huey (United Kingdom) D Inglot	6	6
(Italy) D Bracciali (Czech Republic) L Dlouhý	3	3
(Australia) C Guccione (Australia) B Tomic	2^{r}
3	(Spain) M Granollers (Spain) M López	1

Third round
(Ukraine) S Stakhovsky (Russia) M Youzhny	7^{9}	4	4
10	(Croatia) I Dodig (Brazil) M Melo	6^{7}	6	6
16	(Philippines) T Huey (United Kingdom) D Inglot	7^{7}	6
3	(Spain) M Granollers (Spain) M López	6^{2}	0

Quarterfinals
10	(Croatia) I Dodig (Brazil) M Melo	7	6
16	(Philippines) T Huey (United Kingdom) D Inglot	5	3

==== Section 4 ====
First round
7	(France) J Benneteau (Serbia) N Zimonjić	6	7^{7}
(Poland) T Bednarek (Slovakia) L Lacko	1	6^{4}
WC	(United States) P Oosterbaan (United States) R Schneider	0	4
(United States) B Baker (United States) R Ram	6	6
(Spain) F López (Brazil) A Sá	6	6
(Ukraine) A Dolgopolov (Belgium) X Malisse	1	3
(United Kingdom) J Murray (Australia) J Peers	7^{7}	6
9	(Spain) D Marrero (Spain) F Verdasco	6^{4}	4
13	(Belarus) M Mirnyi (Romania) H Tecău	2	5
(Uruguay) P Cuevas (Argentina) H Zeballos	6	7
WC	(United States) A Krajicek (United States) D Kudla	6	6
(Slovakia) M Kližan (Slovakia) M Mertiňák	3	2
(Spain) P Andújar (Spain) G García-López	2	4
(Germany) C Kas (Austria) O Marach	6	6
WC	(United States) J Blake (United States) J Sock	6	2	2
2	(Austria) A Peya (Brazil) B Soares	4	6	6

Second round
7	(France) J Benneteau (Serbia) N Zimonjić	4	2
(United States) B Baker (United States) R Ram	6	6
(Spain) F López (Brazil) A Sá	7^{9}	5	5
(United Kingdom) J Murray (Australia) J Peers	6^{7}	7	7
(Uruguay) P Cuevas (Argentina) H Zeballos	5	6	7^{12}
WC	(United States) A Krajicek (United States) D Kudla	7	3	6^{10}
(Germany) C Kas (Austria) O Marach	3	2
2	(Austria) A Peya (Brazil) B Soares	6	6

Third round
(United States) B Baker (United States) R Ram	7	6^{2}	6^{4}
(United Kingdom) J Murray (Australia) J Peers	5	7^{7}	7^{7}
(Uruguay) P Cuevas (Argentina) H Zeballos	3	6^{1}
2	(Austria) A Peya (Brazil) B Soares	6	7^{7}

Quarterfinals
(United Kingdom) J Murray (Australia) J Peers	4	7^{7}	4
2	(Austria) A Peya (Brazil) B Soares	6	6^{4}	6
