= 2013 US Open – Mixed doubles =

Mixed doubles
- 2013 US Open

Final
- Champions: (Czech Republic) Andrea Hlaváčková (Belarus) Max Mirnyi
- Runners-up: (United States) Abigail Spears (Mexico) Santiago González
- Score: 7–6^{(7–5)}, 6–3

Details
- Draw: 32
- Seeds: 8

Events
Singles	men	women		boys	girls
Doubles	men	women	mixed	boys	girls
WC Singles	men	women	quad
WC Doubles	men	women	quad
Legends	men	women	mixed
- US Open

Ekaterina Makarova and Bruno Soares were the defending champions, but Makarova decided not to participate. Soares played with Anabel Medina Garrigues, but lost to Abigail Spears and Santiago González in the semifinals.

Andrea Hlaváčková and Max Mirnyi won the title, defeating Spears and González in the final, 7–6^{(7–5)}, 6–3.

== Seeds ==
1. (Germany) Anna-Lena Grönefeld / (Austria) Alexander Peya (first round)
2. (Slovenia) Katarina Srebotnik / (Serbia) Nenad Zimonjić (second round)
3. (Germany) Julia Görges / (India) Rohan Bopanna (first round)
4. (Czech Republic) Květa Peschke / (Poland) Marcin Matkowski (quarterfinals)
5. (Spain) Anabel Medina Garrigues / (Brazil) Bruno Soares (semifinals)
6. (United States) Lisa Raymond / (Netherlands) Jean-Julien Rojer (second round)
7. (Czech Republic) Andrea Hlaváčková / (Belarus) Max Mirnyi (champions)
8. (United States) Liezel Huber / (Brazil) Marcelo Melo (quarterfinals)

== Draw ==
Key

- Q = Qualifier
- WC = Wild card
- LL = Lucky loser
- Alt = Alternate
- ITF = ITF entry
- PR = Protected ranking
- SR = Special ranking
- SE = Special exempt
- JE = Junior exempt
- JR = Junior Accelerator Programme entrant
- CO = College Accelerator Programme entrant
- NG = Next Gen Accelerator Program entrant
- w/o = Walkover
- r = Retired
- d = Defaulted

=== Finals ===
Semifinals
5	(Spain) Anabel Medina Garrigues (Brazil) Bruno Soares	3	1
(United States) Abigail Spears (Mexico) Santiago González	6	6
7	(Czech Republic) Andrea Hlaváčková (Belarus) Max Mirnyi	7	6^{4}	[12]
(France) Kristina Mladenovic (Canada) Daniel Nestor	5	7^{7}	[10]

Final
(United States) Abigail Spears (Mexico) Santiago González	6^{5}	3
7	(Czech Republic) Andrea Hlaváčková (Belarus) Max Mirnyi	7^{7}	6

=== Top half ===
First round
1	(Germany) A-L Grönefeld (Austria) A Peya	6	3	[9]
(Australia) A Barty (Australia) J Peers	4	6	[11]
(Spain) N Llagostera Vives (United Kingdom) C Fleming	2	5
(Czech Republic) L Hradecká (Czech Republic) F Čermák	6	7
(China) S Zheng (Czech Republic) L Dlouhý	6	0	[4]
(Japan) K Date-Krumm (Spain) D Marrero	2	6	[10]
WC	(United States) M Oudin (United States) A Krajicek	5	2
5	(Spain) A Medina Garrigues (Brazil) B Soares	7	6
3	(Germany) J Görges (India) R Bopanna	7^{7}	2	[6]
(United States) A Spears (Mexico) S González	6^{1}	6	[10]
WC	(United States) S Santamaria (United States) J Jenkins	4	1
(France) A Cornet (France) É Roger-Vasselin	6	6
WC	(United States) V Duval (United States) D Young	6	4	[6]
(United States) R Kops-Jones (Philippines) T Huey	2	6	[10]
(India) S Mirza (Romania) H Tecău	6	6^{10}	[4]
8	(United States) L Huber (Brazil) M Melo	4	7^{12}	[10]

Second round
(Australia) A Barty (Australia) J Peers	6^{10}	6^{5}
(Czech Republic) L Hradecká (Czech Republic) F Čermák	7^{12}	7^{7}
(Japan) K Date-Krumm (Spain) D Marrero	3	5
5	(Spain) A Medina Garrigues (Brazil) B Soares	6	7
(United States) A Spears (Mexico) S González	7	6
(France) A Cornet (France) É Roger-Vasselin	5	2
(United States) R Kops-Jones (Philippines) T Huey	6	6^{4}	[5]
8	(United States) L Huber (Brazil) M Melo	4	7^{7}	[10]

Quarterfinals
(Czech Republic) L Hradecká (Czech Republic) F Čermák	4	7^{7}	[11]
5	(Spain) A Medina Garrigues (Brazil) B Soares	6	6^{3}	[13]
(United States) A Spears (Mexico) S González	2	6	[11]
8	(United States) L Huber (Brazil) M Melo	6	1	[9]

Semifinals
5	(Spain) A Medina Garrigues (Brazil) B Soares	3	1
(United States) A Spears (Mexico) S González	6	6

=== Bottom half ===
First round
7	(Czech Republic) A Hlaváčková (Belarus) M Mirnyi	6	6
WC	(United States) K Christian (United States) D Novikov	1	1
WC	(Switzerland) M Hingis (India) M Bhupathi	6^{5}	6^{5}
(Chinese Taipei) Y-j Chan (Sweden) R Lindstedt	7^{7}	7^{7}
(Slovakia) J Husárová (Slovakia) F Polášek	6	7^{7}
WC	(United States) Y Schnack (United States) E Roberson	4	6^{3}
(Australia) A Rodionova (Poland) M Fyrstenberg	3	6	[8]
4	(Czech Republic) K Peschke (Poland) M Matkowski	6	2	[10]
6	(United States) L Raymond (Netherlands) J-J Rojer	6	3	[10]
WC	(United States) M Moulton-Levy (United States) E Butorac	3	6	[7]
WC	(United States) S Stephens (United States) J Sock	4	4
(Chinese Taipei) H-c Chan (Germany) M Emmrich	6	6
(Australia) C Dellacqua (United States) S Lipsky	3	3
(France) K Mladenovic (Canada) D Nestor	6	6
(Zimbabwe) C Black (Pakistan) A-u-H Qureshi	3	1
2	(Slovenia) K Srebotnik (Serbia) N Zimonjić	6	6

Second round
7	(Czech Republic) A Hlaváčková (Belarus) M Mirnyi	6	6
(Chinese Taipei) Y-j Chan (Sweden) R Lindstedt	3	4
(Slovakia) J Husárová (Slovakia) F Polášek	3	4
4	(Czech Republic) K Peschke (Poland) M Matkowski	6	6
6	(United States) L Raymond (Netherlands) J-J Rojer	4	5
(Chinese Taipei) H-c Chan (Germany) M Emmrich	6	7
(France) K Mladenovic (Canada) D Nestor	6	7^{7}
2	(Slovenia) K Srebotnik (Serbia) N Zimonjić	1	6^{3}

Quarterfinals
7	(Czech Republic) A Hlaváčková (Belarus) M Mirnyi	6	6
4	(Czech Republic) K Peschke (Poland) M Matkowski	1	2
(Chinese Taipei) H-c Chan (Germany) M Emmrich	6^{5}	3
(France) K Mladenovic (Canada) D Nestor	7^{7}	6

Semifinals
7	(Czech Republic) A Hlaváčková (Belarus) M Mirnyi	7	6^{4}	[12]
(France) K Mladenovic (Canada) D Nestor	5	7^{7}	[10]
