= 2013 US Open – Boys' singles =

Boys' singles
- 2013 US Open

Final
- Champion: (Croatia) Borna Ćorić
- Runner-up: (Australia) Thanasi Kokkinakis
- Score: 3–6, 6–3, 6–1

Events
| Singles | men | women | | boys | girls |
| Doubles | men | women | mixed | boys | girls |
| WC Singles | men | women | quad |
| WC Doubles | men | women | quad |
| Legends | men | women | mixed |
- US Open

Filip Peliwo was the champion the previous year, but could not defend his title as he was no longer eligible to compete in junior tennis.
Borna Ćorić won the title, defeating Thanasi Kokkinakis in the final, 3–6, 6–3, 6–1.

== Seeds ==
1. (Germany) Alexander Zverev (semifinals)
2. (Italy) Gianluigi Quinzi (quarterfinals)
3. (Chile) Christian Garín (semifinals)
4. (Croatia) Borna Ćorić (champion)
5. (United States) Stefan Kozlov (first round)
6. (France) Johan-Sébastien Tatlot (quarterfinals)
7. (Chile) Guillermo Núñez (first round)
8. (Japan) Yoshihito Nishioka (third round)
9. (South Korea) Chung Hyeon (first round)
10. (Russia) Daniil Medvedev (third round)
11. (Chile) Nicolás Jarry (second round)
12. (Russia) Karen Khachanov (second round)
13. (Belgium) Clément Geens (third round)
14. (Russia) Roman Safiullin (second round)
15. (Peru) Jorge Brian Panta (third round)
16. (United Kingdom) Cameron Norrie (first round)

== Main draw ==
Key

- Q = Qualifier
- WC = Wild card
- LL = Lucky loser
- Alt = Alternate
- ITF = ITF entry
- PR = Protected ranking
- SR = Special ranking
- SE = Special exempt
- JE = Junior exempt
- JR = Junior Accelerator Programme entrant
- CO = College Accelerator Programme entrant
- NG = Next Gen Accelerator Program entrant
- w/o = Walkover
- r = Retired
- d = Defaulted

=== Finals ===
Quarterfinals
1 | (Germany) Alexander Zverev | 6 | 6
WC | (United States) Collin Altamirano | 4 | 4
4 | (Croatia) Borna Ćorić | 6 | 6
(France) Quentin Halys | 3 | 1
6 | (France) Johan-Sébastien Tatlot | 4 | 6^{7}
3 | (Chile) Christian Garín | 6 | 7^{9}
(Australia) Thanasi Kokkinakis | 3 | 6 | 6
2 | (Italy) Gianluigi Quinzi | 6 | 2 | 2

Semifinals
1 | (Germany) Alexander Zverev | 6 | 3 | 0
4 | (Croatia) Borna Ćorić | 4 | 6 | 6
3 | (Chile) Christian Garín | 6 | 3 | 4
(Australia) Thanasi Kokkinakis | 4 | 6 | 6

Final
4 | (Croatia) Borna Ćorić | 3 | 6 | 6
(Australia) Thanasi Kokkinakis | 6 | 3 | 1

=== Top half ===
==== Section 1 ====
First round
1 | (Germany) Alexander Zverev | 6 | 7^{7}
Q | (United States) Taylor Harry Fritz | 3 | 6^{2}
(Australia) Bradley Mousley | 4 | 2
LL | (Mexico) Gerardo López Villaseñor | 6 | 6
(United States) Martin Redlicki | 6 | 6
(Slovakia) Matej Maruščák | 3 | 4
(Japan) Ken Onishi | 6 | 7
16 | (United Kingdom) Cameron Norrie | 4 | 5
12 | (Russia) Karen Khachanov | 6 | 5 | 6
(Denmark) Simon Friis Søndergaard | 4 | 7 | 0
WC | (United States) Collin Altamirano | 7^{7} | 6
(South Korea) Lee Duck-hee | 6^{4} | 1
(France) Maxime Janvier | 6 | 6
Q | (Brazil) Gabriel Vellinho Hocevar | 1 | 2
WC | (United States) Mackenzie McDonald | 3 | 7^{7} | 6
7 | (Chile) Guillermo Núñez | 6 | 6^{5} | 3

Second round
1 | (Germany) A Zverev | 6 | 5 | 6
LL | (Mexico) G López Villaseñor | 1 | 7 | 3
(United States) M Redlicki | 6 | 6
(Japan) K Onishi | 2 | 3
12 | (Russia) K Khachanov | 4 | 4
WC | (United States) C Altamirano | 6 | 6
(France) M Janvier | 2 | 2
WC | (United States) M McDonald | 6 | 6

Third round
1 | (Germany) A Zverev | 6 | 6
(United States) M Redlicki | 4 | 3
WC | (United States) C Altamirano | 3 | 6 | 6
WC | (United States) M McDonald | 6 | 4 | 3

Quarterfinals
1 | (Germany) A Zverev | 6 | 6
WC | (United States) C Altamirano | 4 | 4

==== Section 2 ====
First round
4 | (Croatia) Borna Ćorić | 6 | 6
WC | (United States) Tommy Paul | 1 | 2
(Chile) Jaime Galleguillos | 4 | 3
(China) Zheng Weiqiang | 6 | 6
(Germany) Johannes Härteis | 6 | 6
Q | (United States) Alex Rybakov | 4 | 2
Q | (United Kingdom) Thomas Colautti | 6^{6} | 0
15 | (Peru) Jorge Brian Panta | 7^{8} | 6
9 | (South Korea) Chung Hyeon | 4 | 4
(Russia) Andrey Rublev | 6 | 6
(France) Quentin Halys | 6 | 6
Q | (United States) Frances Tiafoe | 0 | 2
(Brazil) Rafael Matos | 6 | 6
Q | (United States) Reilly Opelka | 4 | 4
(Poland) Kamil Majchrzak | 6 | 5 | 1
8 | (Japan) Yoshihito Nishioka | 1 | 7 | 6

Second round
4 | (Croatia) B Ćorić | 6 | 6
(China) W Zheng | 0 | 0
(Germany) J Härteis | 6^{2} | 3
15 | (Peru) J Panta | 7^{7} | 6
(Russia) A Rublev | 4 | 6 | 1
(France) Q Halys | 6 | 4 | 6
(Brazil) R Matos | 3 | 2
8 | (Japan) Y Nishioka | 6 | 6

Third round
4 | (Croatia) B Ćorić | 6 | 6
15 | (Peru) J Panta | 4 | 2
(France) Q Halys | 6 | 6
8 | (Japan) Y Nishioka | 2 | 0

Quarterfinals
4 | (Croatia) B Ćorić | 6 | 6
(France) Q Halys | 3 | 1

=== Bottom half ===
==== Section 3 ====
First round
6 | (France) Johan-Sébastien Tatlot | 6 | 6
WC | (United States) JC Aragone | 3 | 1
(Germany) Maximilian Marterer | 6 | 1 | 4
(Japan) Takashi Saito | 4 | 6 | 6
(Portugal) Frederico Ferreira Silva | 3 | 6 | 6
(United States) Luca Corinteli | 6 | 1 | 2
(United Kingdom) Luke Bambridge | 4 | 2
10 | (Russia) Daniil Medvedev | 6 | 6
13 | (Belgium) Clément Geens | 2 | 7^{9} | 6
(South Korea) Hong Seong-chan | 6 | 6^{7} | 4
(Australia) Harry Bourchier | 1 | 3
WC | (United States) Daniel Kerznerman | 6 | 6
(Brazil) Marcelo Zormann | 3 | 5
(Sweden) Elias Ymer | 6 | 7
WC | (United States) Jared Donaldson | 6^{4} | 6 | 0
3 | (Chile) Christian Garín | 7^{7} | 4 | 6

Second round
6 | (France) J-S Tatlot | 1 | 6 | 6
(Japan) T Saito | 6 | 3 | 2
(Portugal) F Silva | 4 | 4
10 | (Russia) D Medvedev | 6 | 6
13 | (Belgium) C Geens | 6 | 6
WC | (United States) D Kerznerman | 4 | 0
(Sweden) E Ymer | 3 | 6 | 2
3 | (Chile) C Garín | 6 | 3 | 6

Third round
6 | (France) J-S Tatlot | 7^{9} | 6
10 | (Russia) D Medvedev | 6^{7} | 3
13 | (Belgium) C Geens | 2 | 3
3 | (Chile) C Garín | 6 | 6

Quarterfinals
6 | (France) J-S Tatlot | 4 | 6^{7}
3 | (Chile) C Garín | 6 | 7^{9}

==== Section 4 ====
First round
5 | (United States) Stefan Kozlov | 1 | 2
(Austria) Lucas Miedler | 6 | 6
(United Kingdom) Jonny O'Mara | 2 | 6 | 3
(South Korea) Kim Young-seok | 6 | 1 | 6
(Australia) Thanasi Kokkinakis | 6 | 6
(Japan) Naoki Nakagawa | 3 | 3
WC | (United States) Ernesto Escobedo | 5 | 3
11 | (Chile) Nicolás Jarry | 7 | 6
14 | (Russia) Roman Safiullin | 6 | 6
Q | (France) Alexandre Muller | 1 | 3
(Turkey) Cem İlkel | 2 | 6 | 4
WC | (United States) Gage Brymer | 6 | 4 | 6
(United States) Noah Rubin | 6 | 6
(Germany) Hannes Wagner | 3 | 0
Q | (Japan) Yusuke Takahashi | 2 | 4
2 | (Italy) Gianluigi Quinzi | 6 | 6

Second round
(Austria) L Miedler | 6 | 6
(South Korea) Y-s Kim | 1 | 4
(Australia) T Kokkinakis | 6 | 6
11 | (Chile) N Jarry | 3 | 2
14 | (Russia) R Safiullin | 5 | 6^{r}
WC | (United States) G Brymer | 7 | 5
(United States) N Rubin | 3 | 4
2 | (Italy) G Quinzi | 6 | 6

Third round
(Austria) L Miedler | 2 | 7^{8} | 2
(Australia) T Kokkinakis | 6 | 6^{6} | 6
WC | (United States) G Brymer | 2 | 3
2 | (Italy) G Quinzi | 6 | 6

Quarterfinals
(Australia) T Kokkinakis | 3 | 6 | 6
2 | (Italy) G Quinzi | 6 | 2 | 2
