= 2013 US Open – Wheelchair women's doubles =

Wheelchair women's doubles
- 2013 US Open

Final
- Champion: (Netherlands) Jiske Griffioen (Netherlands) Aniek Van Koot
- Runner-up: (Germany) Sabine Ellerbrock (Japan) Yui Kamiji
- Score: 6–3, 6–4

Events
Singles	men	women		boys	girls
Doubles	men	women	mixed	boys	girls
WC Singles	men	women	quad
WC Doubles	men	women	quad
Legends	men	women	mixed
← 2011 ·	US Open	· 2014 →

Jiske Griffioen and Aniek van Koot defeated Sabine Ellerbrock and Yui Kamiji in the final, 6–3, 6–4 to win the women's doubles wheelchair tennis title at the 2013 US Open. With the win, they completed the Grand Slam, and van Koot completed the career Grand Slam.

Esther Vergeer and Sharon Walraven were the two-time reigning champions from when the event was last held in 2011, not being held in 2012 due to a scheduling conflict with the 2012 Summer Paralympics. However, Vergeer retired from professional wheelchair tennis in February 2013, and Walraven did not participate.

== Seeds ==
1. (Netherlands) Jiske Griffioen / (Netherlands) Aniek Van Koot (champions)
2. (Germany) Sabine Ellerbrock / (Japan) Yui Kamiji (final)

== Doubles ==
=== Key ===
- Q = Qualifier
- WC = Wild card
- LL = Lucky loser
- Alt = Alternate
- ITF = ITF entry
- PR = Protected ranking
- SR = Special ranking
- SE = Special exempt
- JE = Junior exempt
- JR = Junior Accelerator Programme entrant
- CO = College Accelerator Programme entrant
- NG = Next Gen Accelerator Program entrant
- w/o = Walkover
- r = Retired
- d = Defaulted

=== Finals ===
Semifinals
1	(Netherlands) Jiske Griffioen (Netherlands) Aniek Van Koot	7^{7}	3	6
(South Africa) Kgothatso Montjane (United Kingdom) Jordanne Whiley	6^{3}	6	1
(Netherlands) Marjolein Buis (United Kingdom) Lucy Shuker	3	6	4
2	(Germany) Sabine Ellerbrock (Japan) Yui Kamiji	6	3	6

Finals
1	(Netherlands) Jiske Griffioen (Netherlands) Aniek Van Koot	6	6
2	(Germany) Sabine Ellerbrock (Japan) Yui Kamiji	3	4
