= 2013 US Open – Wheelchair quad singles =

Wheelchair quad singles
- 2013 US Open

Final
- Champion: (South Africa) Lucas Sithole
- Runner-up: (United States) David Wagner
- Score: 3-6, 6-4, 6-4

Events
Singles	men	women		boys	girls
Doubles	men	women	mixed	boys	girls
WC Singles	men	women	quad
WC Doubles	men	women	quad
Legends	men	women	mixed
- US Open

Lucas Sithole defeated the two-time defending champion David Wagner in the final, 3–6, 6–4, 6–4 to win the quad singles wheelchair tennis title at the 2013 US Open.

There was no competition in 2012 due to a schedule conflict with the 2012 Summer Paralympics.

== Draw ==
Key

- Q = Qualifier
- WC = Wild card
- LL = Lucky loser
- Alt = Alternate
- ITF = ITF entry
- PR = Protected ranking
- SR = Special ranking
- SE = Special exempt
- JE = Junior exempt
- JR = Junior Accelerator Programme entrant
- CO = College Accelerator Programme entrant
- NG = Next Gen Accelerator Program entrant
- w/o = Walkover
- r = Retired
- d = Defaulted

=== Final ===
Final
1	(United States) David Wagner	6	4	4
	(South Africa) Lucas Sithole	3	6	6

=== Round robin ===
		(United States) Wagner	(South Africa) Sithole	(United States) Taylor	(United Kingdom) Lapthorne	RR W–L	Set W–L	Game W–L	Standings
1	(United States) David Wagner		6–1, 4–6, 1–6	6–0, 6–0	6–3, 6–1	2–1	5–2	35–17	2
	(South Africa) Lucas Sithole	1–6, 6–4, 6–1		6–2, 6–2	1–6, 7–5, 6–1	3–0	6–2	39–27	1
	(United States) Nick Taylor	0–6, 0–6	2–6, 2–6		4–6, 4–6	0–3	0–6	12–36	4
2	(United Kingdom) Andrew Lapthorne	3–6, 1–6	6–1, 5–7, 1–6	6–4, 6–4		1–2	3–4	28–34	3

Standings are determined by: 1. number of wins; 2. number of matches; 3. in two-players-ties, head-to-head records; 4. in three-players-ties, percentage of sets won, or of games won; 5. steering-committee decision.
