= 2014 in tennis =

This page covers all the important events in the sport of tennis in 2014. It primarily provides the results of notable tournaments throughout the year on both the Association of Tennis Professionals and Women's Tennis Association Tours, the Davis Cup, and the Fed Cup.

== International Tennis Federation ==
=== Grand Slam events ===
Championship	Category	Champion(s)	Finalist(s)	Score in the final
Australian Open (January 13 – January 26)	Men's singles	(Switzerland) Stanislas Wawrinka	(Spain) Rafael Nadal	6–3, 6–2, 3–6, 6–3
Australian Open (January 13 – January 26)	Women's singles	(China) Li Na	(Slovakia) Dominika Cibulková	7–6^{(7–3)}, 6–0
Australian Open (January 13 – January 26)	Men's doubles	(Poland) Łukasz Kubot (Sweden) Robert Lindstedt	(United States) Eric Butorac (South Africa) Raven Klaasen	6–3, 6–3
Australian Open (January 13 – January 26)	Women's doubles	(Italy) Sara Errani (Italy) Roberta Vinci	(Russia) Ekaterina Makarova (Russia) Elena Vesnina	6–4, 3–6, 7–5
Australian Open (January 13 – January 26)	Mixed doubles	(France) Kristina Mladenovic (Canada) Daniel Nestor	(India) Sania Mirza (Romania) Horia Tecău	6–3, 6–2

Championship	Category	Champion(s)	Finalist(s)	Score in the final
French Open (May 26 – June 8)	Men's singles	(Spain) Rafael Nadal	(Serbia) Novak Djokovic	3–6, 7–5, 6–2, 6–4
French Open (May 26 – June 8)	Women's singles	(Russia) Maria Sharapova	(Romania) Simona Halep	6–4, 6–7^{(5–7)}, 6–4
French Open (May 26 – June 8)	Men's doubles	(France) Julien Benneteau (France) Édouard Roger-Vasselin	(Spain) Marcel Granollers (Spain) Marc López	6–3, 7–6^{(7–1)}
French Open (May 26 – June 8)	Women's doubles	(Chinese Taipei) Hsieh Su-wei (China) Peng Shuai	(Italy) Sara Errani (Italy) Roberta Vinci	6–4, 6–1
French Open (May 26 – June 8)	Mixed doubles	(Germany) Anna-Lena Grönefeld (Netherlands) Jean-Julien Rojer	(Germany) Julia Görges (Serbia) Nenad Zimonjić	4–6, 6–2, [10–7]

Championship	Category	Champion(s)	Finalist(s)	Score in the final
Wimbledon Championships (June 23 – July 6)	Men's singles	(Serbia) Novak Djokovic	(Switzerland) Roger Federer	6–7^{(7–9)}, 6–4, 7–6^{(7–4)}, 5–7, 6–4
Wimbledon Championships (June 23 – July 6)	Women's singles	(Czech Republic) Petra Kvitová	(Canada) Eugenie Bouchard	6–3, 6–0
Wimbledon Championships (June 23 – July 6)	Men's doubles	(Canada) Vasek Pospisil (United States) Jack Sock	(United States) Bob Bryan (United States) Mike Bryan	7–6^{(7–5)}, 6–7^{(3–7)}, 6–4, 3–6, 7–5
Wimbledon Championships (June 23 – July 6)	Women's doubles	(Italy) Sara Errani (Italy) Roberta Vinci	(Hungary) Tímea Babos (France) Kristina Mladenovic	6–1, 6–3
Wimbledon Championships (June 23 – July 6)	Mixed doubles	(Serbia) Nenad Zimonjić (Australia) Samantha Stosur	(Belarus) Max Mirnyi (Chinese Taipei) Chan Hao-ching	6–4, 6–2

Championship	Category	Champion(s)	Finalist(s)	Score in the final
US Open (August 25 – September 7)	Men's singles	(Croatia) Marin Čilić	(Japan) Kei Nishikori	6–3, 6–3, 6–3
US Open (August 25 – September 7)	Women's singles	(United States) Serena Williams	(Denmark) Caroline Wozniacki	6–3, 6–3
US Open (August 25 – September 7)	Men's doubles	(United States) Bob Bryan (United States) Mike Bryan	(Spain) Marcel Granollers (Spain) Marc López	6–3, 6–4
US Open (August 25 – September 7)	Women's doubles	(Russia) Ekaterina Makarova (Russia) Elena Vesnina	(Switzerland) Martina Hingis (Italy) Flavia Pennetta	2–6, 6–3, 6–2
US Open (August 25 – September 7)	Mixed doubles	(India) Sania Mirza (Brazil) Bruno Soares	(United States) Abigail Spears (Mexico) Santiago González	6–1, 2–6, [11–9]

- A total of ten men reached the third round at all four Grand Slams: Kevin Anderson, Roberto Bautista Agut, Tomáš Berdych, Novak Djokovic, Roger Federer, Andy Murray, Milos Raonic, Tommy Robredo, Gilles Simon, and Jo-Wilfried Tsonga. Of the ten, only four managed to reach the fourth round or better at every major. Federer and Tsonga reached at least the fourth round at all four slams while Djokovic and Murray reached at least the quarterfinals at every major.
- Just six women reached the third round at all four Grand Slams: Eugenie Bouchard, Simona Halep, Angelique Kerber, Ekaterina Makarova, Lucie Šafářová, and Maria Sharapova. Bouchard and Sharapova were the only two to reach at least the fourth round at every major.

=== Davis Cup ===
World Group Draw

First round 31 January −2 February
Ostrava, Czech Republic – (indoor hard)
1	Czech Republic	3
Netherlands	2
Tokyo, Japan – (indoor hard)
7	Canada	1
Japan	4
Frankfurt, Germany – (indoor hard)
3	Spain	1
Germany	4
Mouilleron-le-Captif, France – (indoor clay)
5	France	5
Australia	0
San Diego, United States – (clay)
Great Britain	3
6	United States	1
Mar de Plata, Argentina – (clay)
Italy	3
4	Argentina	1
Astana, Kazakhstan – (indoor hard)
Belgium	2
8	Kazakhstan	3
Novi Sad, Serbia – (indoor hard)
Switzerland	3
2	Serbia	2

Quarterfinals; 4–6 April
Tokyo, Japan – (indoor hard)
1	Czech Republic	5
Japan	0
Nancy, France – (indoor hard)
Germany	2
5	France	3
Naples, Italy – (clay)
Great Britain	2
Italy	3
Geneva, Switzerland – (indoor hard)
8	Kazakhstan	2
Switzerland	3

Semifinals; 12–14 September
Paris, France – (clay)
1	Czech Republic	1
5	France	4
Geneva, Switzerland – (indoor hard)
Italy	2
Switzerland	3

Final; 21–23 November
Lille, France – (indoor clay)
5	France	1
Switzerland	3

=== Fed Cup ===
World Group Draw

Quarterfinals; 8–9 February
Cleveland, United States (indoor hard)
1	Italy	3
United States	1
Seville, Spain (outdoor clay)
Spain	2
3	Czech Republic	3
Bratislava, Slovakia (indoor hard)
4	Slovakia	1
Germany	3
Hobart, Australia (outdoor hard)
Australia	4
2	Russia	0

Semifinals; 19–20 April
Ostrava, Czech Republic (indoor hard)
1	Italy	0
3	Czech Republic	4
Brisbane, Australia (outdoor hard)
Germany	3
Australia	1

Final; 8–9 November
Prague, Czech Republic (indoor hard)
3	Czech Republic	3
Germany	1

== International Olympic Committee ==
- 7–18 March: South American Games
- 17–24 August: Youth Olympics
- 30–30 September: Asian Games
- 24–30 November: Central American and Caribbean Games

== Important events ==
=== January ===
- The Australian Open along with five ATP tournaments, seven WTA tournaments, the Hopman Cup, and the first week of Davis Cup were scheduled in January.
- Grand Slam champions Andy Murray and Maria Sharapova along with former world number two, Vera Zvonareva, returned to their respective tours after recovering from injury.
- French duo Jo-Wilfried Tsonga and Alizé Cornet defeated Poland in the Hopman Cup Final to give France its first Hopman Cup victory.
- Lleyton Hewitt and Roger Federer extended their historic rivalry when the Australian defeated Federer in the final of the Brisbane International.
- After a record nine first-round retirements in the singles draws of the Australian Open, the ATP considers adding an extreme heat policy to mediate extreme temperatures on court.
- By winning her third round encounter against Daniela Hantuchová, women's top seed Serena Williams broke Margaret Court's record of 60 match victories at the Australian Open; however, she was subsequently defeated in the next round by Ana Ivanovic in three-sets.
- Doubles top seed, Mike Bryan and Bob Bryan made their earliest exit at the Australian Open in 11 years after they were defeated by the unseeded duo of Eric Butorac and Raven Klaasen in the third round.
- Li Na followed up her win at the Shenzhen Open by reaching her third Australian Open final. She defeated first-time finalist Dominika Cibulková to earn her second career Grand Slam title.
- After fourteen consecutive losses to Novak Djokovic, Stanislas Wawrinka defeated the three-time defending champion in the quarterfinals of the Australian Open. He followed up this win by going on to defeat world number one Rafael Nadal in the final for the first time in thirteen career meetings with the Spaniard. It was Wawrinka's second title of the year after winning the Aircel Chennai Open earlier in January.
- The first round of the Davis Cup saw five seeds fail to advance to the second round. Of the top four seeds, only the Czech Republic won its tie while Serbia, Spain, and Argentina lost to Switzerland, Germany, and Italy, respectively. Japan, France, Great Britain, and Kazakhstan also advanced.
- Rafael Nadal, Juan Martín del Potro, John Isner, Ana Ivanovic, Garbiñe Muguruza, and Ekaterina Makarova also won titles.

WTA Premier	Category	Champion(s)	Finalist(s)	Score in the final
Brisbane; Premier (December 30 – January 5)	Women's singles	(United States) Serena Williams	(Belarus) Victoria Azarenka	6–4, 7–5
Brisbane; Premier (December 30 – January 5)	Women's doubles	(Russia) Alla Kudryavtseva (Australia) Anastasia Rodionova	(France) Kristina Mladenovic (Kazakhstan) Galina Voskoboeva	6–3, 6–1
Sydney; Premier (January 6 – January 12)	Women's singles	(Bulgaria) Tsvetana Pironkova	(Germany) Angelique Kerber	6–4, 6–4
Sydney; Premier (January 6 – January 12)	Women's doubles	(Hungary) Tímea Babos (Czech Republic) Lucie Šafářová	(Italy) Sara Errani (Italy) Roberta Vinci	7–5, 3–6, [10–7]
Paris; Premier (January 27 – February 2)	Women's singles	(Russia) Anastasia Pavlyuchenkova	(Italy) Sara Errani	3–6, 6–2, 6–3
Paris; Premier (January 27 – February 2)	Women's doubles	(Germany) Anna-Lena Grönefeld (Czech Republic) Květa Peschke	(Hungary) Tímea Babos (France) Kristina Mladenovic	6–7^{(7–9)}, 6–4, [10–5]

=== February ===
- Twelve ATP tournaments, five WTA tournaments, and the first week of Fed Cup were scheduled in February.
- The Czech Republic nearly joined fellow fallen seeds Russia and Slovakia, but pulled off a 3–2 victory over Spain in the first round of Fed Cup. Italy, Germany, and Australia also advanced to the semifinals.
- Peng Shuai made history and became the first Chinese number one in any tennis discipline, male or female, by reaching the top spot of the WTA's doubles rankings.
- Marin Čilić continued his impressive start to the year by reaching his third consecutive ATP Tournament final. He defeated Kevin Anderson in the Delray Beacch final to add to his fourth Zagreb title he collected earlier in February. The win meant that Čilić led the tour in match wins with an 18–4 record.
- Gaël Monfils, Fabio Fognini, Kei Nishikori, David Ferrer, Ernests Gulbis, Federico Delbonis, Kurumi Nara, Dominika Cibulková, and Klára Zakopalová also won titles.

ATP World Tour 500	Category	Champion(s)	Finalist(s)	Score in the final
Rotterdam (February 10 – February 16)	Men's singles	(Czech Republic) Tomáš Berdych	(Croatia) Marin Čilić	6–4, 6–2
Rotterdam (February 10 – February 16)	Men's doubles	(France) Michaël Llodra (France) Nicolas Mahut	(Netherlands) Jean-Julien Rojer (Romania) Horia Tecău	6–2, 7–6(4)
Rio de Janeiro (February 17 – February 23)	Men's singles	(Spain) Rafael Nadal	(Ukraine) Alexandr Dolgopolov	6–3, 7–6(3)
Rio de Janeiro (February 17 – February 23)	Men's doubles	(Colombia) Juan Sebastián Cabal (Colombia) Robert Farah	(Spain) David Marrero (Brazil) Marcelo Melo	6–4, 6–2
Dubai (February 24 – March 2)	Men's singles	(Switzerland) Roger Federer	(Czech Republic) Tomáš Berdych	3–6, 6–4, 6–3
Dubai (February 24 – March 2)	Men's doubles	(India) Rohan Bopanna (Pakistan) Aisam-ul-Haq Qureshi	(Canada) Daniel Nestor (Serbia) Nenad Zimonjić	6–4, 6–3
Acapulco (February 24 – March 2)	Men's singles	(Bulgaria) Grigor Dimitrov	(South Africa) Kevin Anderson	7–6(1), 3–6, 7–6(5)
Acapulco (February 24 – March 2)	Men's doubles	(South Africa) Kevin Anderson (Australia) Matthew Ebden	(Spain) Feliciano López (Belarus) Max Mirnyi	6–3, 6–3

WTA Premier	Category	Champion(s)	Finalist(s)	Score in the final
Qatar; Premier 5 (February 10 – February 16)	Women's singles	(Romania) Simona Halep	(Germany) Angelique Kerber	6–2, 6–3
Qatar; Premier 5 (February 10 – February 16)	Women's doubles	(Chinese Taipei) Hsieh Su-wei (China) Peng Shuai	(Czech Republic) Květa Peschke (Slovenia) Katarina Srebotnik	6–4, 6–0
Dubai; Premier (February 17 – February 23)	Women's singles	(United States) Venus Williams	(France) Alizé Cornet	6–3, 6–0
Dubai; Premier (February 17 – February 23)	Women's doubles	(Australia) Anastasia Rodionova (Russia) Alla Kudryavtseva	(United States) Raquel Kops-Jones (United States) Abigail Spears	6–2, 5–7, [10–8]

=== March ===
- Two ATP tournaments, four WTA tournaments, and the second week of Davis Cup were scheduled in March.
- Due to their deep runs at Indian Wells, Simona Halep and Roger Federer reached the number five ranking on their respective tours. This was Halep's top five debut while Federer re-entered the top five after a twelve-year low ranked number eight.
- The results of Indian Wells caused a considerable shift among the ATP Tour Top Ten Rankings. Along with Federer's return to the top five, Tomáš Berdych fell to number seven, John Isner made a return to the top ten, and Jo-Wilfried Tsonga fell out of the top ten for the first time in nearly three years.
- Being led by former world number one, Roger Federer, and Australian Open champion, Stanislas Wawrinka, Switzerland pulled off another upset against the eighth seeded Kazakhstan to reach the semifinals of the Davis Cup. They will face off against Italy on the bottom half of the draw while the first and fifth seeded teams of Czech Republic and France will meet in the other semifinal.
- 17-year-old Belinda Bencic reached her first WTA semi-final at the Family Circle Cup in Charleston. Due to the result, Bencic is the first player to be born after 1996 to enter the WTA top 100. The tournament also saw Serena Williams upset in her opening round match against Jana Čepelová. The upset snapped a 28-match winning streak Williams had on clay courts. Čepelová would be the eventual finalist of the tournament.
- Andrea Petkovic and Ana Ivanovic also won titles.

ATP World Tour 1000/WTA Premier Mandatory	Category	Champion(s)	Finalist(s)	Score in the final
Indian Wells (March 3 – March 16)	Men's singles	(Serbia) Novak Djokovic	(Switzerland) Roger Federer	3–6, 6–3, 7–6^{(7–3)}
Indian Wells (March 3 – March 16)	Women's singles	(Italy) Flavia Pennetta	(Poland) Agnieszka Radwańska	6–2, 6–1
Indian Wells (March 3 – March 16)	Men's doubles	(United States) Bob Bryan (United States) Mike Bryan	(Austria) Alexander Peya (Brazil) Bruno Soares	6–4, 6–3
Indian Wells (March 3 – March 16)	Women's doubles	(Chinese Taipei) Hsieh Su-wei (China) Peng Shuai	(Zimbabwe) Cara Black (India) Sania Mirza	7–6^{(7–5)}, 6–2
Miami (March 17 – March 30)	Men's singles	(Serbia) Novak Djokovic^{1}	(Spain) Rafael Nadal	6–3, 6–3
Miami (March 17 – March 30)	Women's singles	(United States) Serena Williams	(China) Li Na	7–5, 6–1
Miami (March 17 – March 30)	Men's doubles	(United States) Bob Bryan (United States) Mike Bryan	(Colombia) Juan Sebastián Cabal (Colombia) Robert Farah	7–6(4), 6–4
Miami (March 17 – March 30)	Women's doubles	(Switzerland) Martina Hingis^{2} (Germany) Sabine Lisicki	(Russia) Ekaterina Makarova (Russia) Elena Vesnina	4–6, 6–4, [10–5]

1. Djokovic becomes the second man after Federer to win the Indian Wells-Miami double twice. This was Djokovic's fourth title in Miami.
2. This was Hingis' first tournament title since making her doubles comeback in 2013.

=== April ===
- Seven ATP tournaments, six WTA tournaments, and the second week of Fed Cup were scheduled in April.
- Dominika Cibulková led the WTA in match-wins after winning her 22nd match of the season at the Malaysian Open. She would raise that total to 24 before falling in the final to first-time WTA titlist Donna Vekić.
- The Czech Republic reached its third Fed Cup final in four years after defeating defending champions, Italy, in the semifinals. After a 22-year final drought, Germany also advanced to the final with a win over Australia. Russia, Canada, France and Poland earned places in the 2015 World Group. This will be Canada and Poland's first time contesting in the World Group. For the first time in the tournament's history, the United States was regulated to World Group Two after its loss to France.
- Fernando Verdasco, Guillermo García-López, Grigor Dimitrov, Carlos Berlocq, Martin Kližan, Alizé Cornet, Caroline Garcia, María Teresa Torró Flor, and Carla Suárez Navarro also won titles.

ATP World Tour 1000	Category	Champion(s)	Finalist(s)	Score in the final
Monte Carlo (April 14 – April 20)	Men's singles	(Switzerland) Stanislas Wawrinka^{1}	(Switzerland) Roger Federer	4–6, 7–6(5), 6–2
Monte Carlo (April 14 – April 20)	Men's doubles	(United States) Bob Bryan (United States) Mike Bryan	(Croatia) Ivan Dodig (Brazil) Marcelo Melo	6–3, 3–6, [10–8]

ATP World Tour 500	Category	Champion(s)	Finalist(s)	Score in the final
Barcelona (April 21 – April 27)	Men's singles	(Japan) Kei Nishikori	(Colombia) Santiago Giraldo	6–2, 6–2
Barcelona (April 21 – April 27)	Men's doubles	(Netherlands) Jesse Huta Galung (France) Stéphane Robert	(Canada) Daniel Nestor (Serbia) Nenad Zimonjić	6–3, 6–3

WTA Premier	Category	Champion(s)	Finalist(s)	Score in the final
Stuttgart; Premier (April 21 – April 27)	Women's singles	(Russia) Maria Sharapova^{2}	(Serbia) Ana Ivanovic	3–6, 6–4, 6–1
Stuttgart; Premier (April 21 – April 27)	Women's doubles	(Italy) Sara Errani (Italy) Roberta Vinci	(Zimbabwe) Cara Black (India) Sania Mirza	6–2, 6–3

1. This was Wawrinka's first Masters 1000 title of his career. The win also propelled him to the top spot of the race to the ATP World Tour Finals.
2. This was Sharapova's third consecutive title in Stuttgart and the 30th career title of her career. It was also the first time Sharapova had won a tournament three different times.

=== May ===
- The French Open along with four ATP tournaments and four WTA tournaments were scheduled in May.
- Since losing to Li Na in the 2011 French Open semifinals, Maria Sharapova's only losses in her next fifty matches on clay came at the hands of Serena Williams. This streak came to an end when Ana Ivanovic defeated the Russian in the third round in Rome.
- For the first time in the history of the sport, both incumbent Grand Slam champions were defeated in the first round of the subsequent major. The French Open saw Australian Open men's singles champions Stanislas Wawrinka upset by Guillermo García-López while Kristina Mladenovic defeated women's champion, Li Na, in the opening round.
- Defending champion and tournament favorite Serena Williams was upset in the second round of the French Open a day after Li Na was defeated in the first round. This marked the first time in the Open Era that the top two seeds in the women's singles main draw were knocked out before the third round of a Grand Slam. More history was made when third seeded Agnieszka Radwańska was upset in the third round, marking the first time in the Open Era that a top three seed did not advance to the second week of a major.
- For the first time in her career, Maria Sharapova came back from a set down to win three consecutive matches at a tournament en route to her third consecutive French Open final. She would go on to win a 20th consecutive three-set match on clay by defeating Simona Halep in the championship match. This was Sharapova's fifth Grand Slam title and her second at the French Open.
- Rafael Nadal made history by becoming the first player to win a ninth title at a single major championship by defeating Novak Djokovic in the French Open final. This was also Nadal's fifth straight title at Roland Garros and his 90th match win at the tournament as well.
- WTA upstarts Eugenie Bouchard and Monica Puig won their maiden career titles, joining Philipp Kohlschreiber and Ernests Gulbis on the ATP Tour as title winners in the final week before the French Open.

ATP Tour 1000/WTA Premier Mandatory	Category	Champion(s)	Finalist(s)	Score in the final
Madrid (May 5 – May 11)	Men's singles	(Spain) Rafael Nadal	(Japan) Kei Nishikori	2–6, 6–4, 3–0 (ret)
Madrid (May 5 – May 11)	Women's singles	(Russia) Maria Sharapova	(Romania) Simona Halep	1–6, 6–2, 6–3
Madrid (May 5 – May 11)	Men's doubles	(Canada) Daniel Nestor (Serbia) Nenad Zimonjić	(United States) Bob Bryan (United States) Mike Bryan	6–4, 6–2
Madrid (May 5 – May 11)	Women's doubles	(Italy) Sara Errani (Italy) Roberta Vinci	(Spain) Garbiñe Muguruza (Spain) Carla Suárez Navarro	6–4, 6–3

ATP Tour 1000/WTA Premier 5	Category	Champion(s)	Finalist(s)	Score in the final
Rome (May 12 – May 18)	Men's singles	(Serbia) Novak Djokovic	(Spain) Rafael Nadal	4–6, 6–3, 6–3
Rome (May 12 – May 18)	Women's singles	(United States) Serena Williams	(Italy) Sara Errani	6–3, 6–0
Rome (May 12 – May 18)	Men's doubles	(Canada) Daniel Nestor (Serbia) Nenad Zimonjić	(Netherlands) Robin Haase (Spain) Feliciano López	6–4, 7–6(2)
Rome (May 12 – May 18)	Women's doubles	(Czech Republic) Květa Peschke (Slovenia) Katarina Srebotnik	(Italy) Sara Errani (Italy) Roberta Vinci	4–0, ret.

=== June ===
- The Wimbledon Championships along with four ATP tournaments and three WTA tournaments were scheduled in June.
- The top women seeds were on the wrong side of history yet again at a Grand Slam. Serena Williams and Li Na were both upset in the third round. It is the first time in the Open Era that the top two seeded women lost in the first week of Wimbledon. Agnieszka Radwańska and Maria Sharapova, the tournament's fourth and fifth seeds, were also defeated before the quarterfinals.
- Nick Kyrgios stunned Rafael Nadal in the fourth round of Wimbledon resulting in three players born in the 1990s being in the quarterfinals of a Grand Slam tournament for the first time. Kyrgios joined Milos Raonic and Grigor Dimitrov in the last eight and the latter two would ultimately reach the final four as well.
- Sara Errani and Roberta Vinci became the fifth partnership in the Open Era to complete a career Grand Slam in women's doubles after winning the Wimbledon title over Tímea Babos and Kristina Mladenovic.
- The women's final at Wimbledon was the first Grand Slam final to be contested between two players born in the 1990s. Petra Kvitová would remain as the only Grand Slam champion born in this decade by capturing her second Wimbledon title. In the final, Kvitová defeated Eugenie Bouchard, who was Canada's first Grand Slam finalist.
- Novak Djokovic denied Roger Federer an unprecedented eighth Wimbledon title by defeating the Swiss in the championship final. This was Djokovic's second Wimbledon title of his career and his seventh major title overall.
- Roger Federer, Grigor Dimitrov, Roberto Bautista Agut, Feliciano López, and Coco Vandeweghe also won titles.

WTA Premier	Category	Champion(s)	Finalist(s)	Score in the final
Birmingham; Premier (June 9 – June 15)	Women's singles	(Serbia) Ana Ivanovic^{1}	(Czech Republic) Barbora Záhlavová-Strýcová	6–3, 6–2
Birmingham; Premier (June 9 – June 15)	Women's doubles	(United States) Raquel Kops-Jones (United States) Abigail Spears	(Australia) Ashleigh Barty (Australia) Casey Dellacqua	7–6^{(7–1)}, 6–1
Eastbourne; Premier (June 16 – June 22)	Women's singles	(United States) Madison Keys	(Germany) Angelique Kerber	6–3, 3–6, 7–5
Eastbourne; Premier (June 16 – June 22)	Women's doubles	(Chinese Taipei) Chan Hao-ching (Chinese Taipei) Chan Yung-jan	(Switzerland) Martina Hingis (Italy) Flavia Pennetta	6–3, 5–7, [10–7]

1. This was Ivanovic's first title on grass and her fourteenth title overall. The win was also a tour leading 37th match win-three more than the closest contender.

=== July ===
- Ten ATP tournaments and seven WTA tournaments were scheduled in July. July also marked the beginning of the US Open Series.
- When the new rankings were released on July 7, Novak Djokovic officially became the first man to qualify for the ATP World Tour Finals in November. Rafael Nadal became the second man to qualify in the following week.
- For the first time since 2004, former world number one Lleyton Hewitt won multiple titles in a single year by defeating Ivo Karlović in the Newport final, adding a fifth different grass court title to his career total.
- The first ATP World Tour final contested between two players born in the 1990s occurred in Kitzbühel where David Goffin defeated Dominic Thiem to claim his first career title. Days later, more history was made at the Citi Open by Milos Raonic and Vasek Pospisil. Not only was the matchup the second ATP World Tour final between two players born in the 1990s, it was also the first ever all-Canadian final on the ATP World Tour.
- Roberto Bautista Agut, Pablo Cuevas(2), Bernard Tomic, Pablo Andújar, Simona Halep, Andrea Petkovic, Mona Barthel, Caroline Wozniacki, Elina Svitolina, and Svetlana Kuznetsova also won titles.

ATP World Tour 500	Category	Champion(s)	Finalist(s)	Score in the final
Hamburg (July 14 – July 20)	Men's singles	(Argentina) Leonardo Mayer	(Spain) David Ferrer	6–7^{(3–7)}, 6–1, 7–6^{(7–4)}
Hamburg (July 14 – July 20)	Men's doubles	(Croatia) Marin Draganja (Romania) Florin Mergea	(Austria) Alexander Peya (Brazil) Bruno Soares	6–4, 7–5

US Open Series Week	Date	Men's Events	Women's Events
1	July 21–27	Atlanta; 2014 Champion: (United States) John Isner	No Series Event Held This Week
2	July 28 – August 3	Washington, D.C. 2014 Champion: (Canada) Milos Raonic	Stanford; 2014 Champion: (United States) Serena Williams

=== August ===
- The US Open along with three ATP tournaments and three WTA tournaments were scheduled in August. August also marked the conclusion of the US Open Series.
- Venus and Serena Williams revived their sixteen-year rivalry in the semifinals of the Rogers Cup. In just their second meeting in the past four years, Venus snapped a five match losing streak to the current world number one and booked her place in the final.
- In a dramatic three-set encounter, Ana Ivanovic defeated Maria Sharapova in the semifinals of the Western and Southern Open. The win meant that Ivanovic would enter the US Open with a tour-leading 47 match wins and a return to the top ten in the WTA Tour rankings.
- Novak Djokovic's bid to become the first man to win all nine Masters 1000 titles was cut short in the round of sixteen at the Western and Southern Open. The world number one enters the final Grand Slam of the year with a 2–2 win loss record in the US Open Series.
- After withdrawing from all other summer hard court events, defending champion Rafael Nadal also withdrew from the US Open due to a right wrist injury.
- Due to a recent rule change in which a player's point total is doubled by accumulating points from at least three different tournaments, Milos Raonic was the men's winner of the 2014 US Open Series despite not winning either of the two Masters 1000 titles. The rule did not affect the outcome of the women's winner in which Stanford and Cincinnati champion, Serena Williams was rewarded first place.
- The US Open women's top seeds had yet another disappointing showing at a Grand Slam event. For the third consecutive major tournament, three of the top four seeds failed to advance to the quarterfinals. The results matched those of the French Open in that three of the top four seeds failed to reach the second week of a Grand Slam. Agnieszka Radwańska was seeded fourth and lost in the second round while the third round resulted in upsets for the second seeded Simona Halep and the third seeded Petra Kvitová.
- Mike and Bob Bryan won a monumental 100th tour level title by capturing their fifth US Open championship in the men's doubles.
- By virtue of advancing to the US Open final, Serena Williams became the first woman to qualify for the season ending championships in Singapore. In the final, Williams defeated Caroline Wozniacki to win her third straight US Open title and 18th Grand Slam title overall. The win was monumental in many aspects: it placed Williams in a three-way tie for second most Grand Slam titles in the open era with Martina Navratilova and Chris Evert and it also tied her with Evert for most US Open titles in the open era with six.
- For the first time since the 2005 Australian Open, neither Roger Federer, Rafael Nadal, nor Novak Djokovic were present in a Grand Slam final. In the semifinals, Kei Nishikori knocked out top-ranked Djokovic, while Marin Čilić upset Federer to set up a historic final at the US Open. Čilić would go on to take the title, defeating Asia's first Grand Slam finalist, Nishikori, in straight sets.

US Open Series Week	Date	Men's Events	Women's Events
3	Aug 4–10	Toronto; 2014 Champion: (France) Jo-Wilfried Tsonga	Montreal; 2014 Champion: (Poland) Agnieszka Radwańska
4	Aug 11–17	Cincinnati; 2014 Champion: (Switzerland) Roger Federer^{1}	Cincinnati; 2014 Champion: (United States) Serena Williams
5	Aug 18–24	Winston-Salem; 2014 Champion: (Czech Republic) Lukáš Rosol	New Haven; 2014 Champion: (Czech Republic) Petra Kvitová

1. Due to his results in Cincinnati, Federer became the third man to qualify for the ATP World Tour Finals. This was his record thirteenth consecutive year in which he qualified for the year end championships.

=== September ===
- Six ATP tournaments, eight WTA tournaments, and the third week of the Davis Cup were scheduled in September.
- Maria Sharapova became the second woman to qualify for the year-end Championships on September 9. Simona Halep joined Sharapova in the eight woman line-up on September 15.
- Roger Federer and Stanislas Wawrinka continued Switzerland's dream run, carrying their team to the Davis Cup final in a 3–2 defeat of Italy. Led by Jo-Wilfried Tsonga, France upset defending champions, Czech Republic, in the semifinals to book a final against Switzerland.
- Mirjana Lučić-Baroni set a WTA record for longest gap between titles by winning the Coupe Banque Nationale sixteen years after capturing her last title.
- Australian Open champion Li Na announced her retirement from the sport on September 19. Li was the first Asian Grand Slam singles champion, male or female, and was ranked number 6 at the time of the announcement.
- David Goffin, Andy Murray, Kei Nishikori, Sabine Lisicki, Karin Knapp, and Monica Niculescu also won titles.

ATP World Tour 500	Category	Champion(s)	Finalist(s)	Score in the final
Tokyo (September 29 – October 5)	Men's singles	(Japan) Kei Nishikori	(Canada) Milos Raonic	7–6^{(7–5)}, 4–6, 6–4
Tokyo (September 29 – October 5)	Men's doubles	(France) Pierre-Hugues Herbert (Poland) Michał Przysiężny	(Croatia) Ivan Dodig (Brazil) Marcelo Melo	6–3, 6–7^{(3–7)}, [10–5]

WTA Premier	Category	Champion(s)	Finalist(s)	Score in the final
Tokyo; Premier (September 15 – September 21)	Women's singles	(Serbia) Ana Ivanovic	(Denmark) Caroline Wozniacki	6–2, 7–6(2)
Tokyo; Premier (September 15 – September 21)	Women's doubles	(Zimbabwe) Cara Black (India) Sania Mirza	(Spain) Garbiñe Muguruza (Spain) Carla Suárez Navarro	6–2, 7–5
Wuhan; Premier 5 (September 22 – September 28)	Women's singles	(Czech Republic) Petra Kvitová^{1}	(Canada) Eugenie Bouchard	6–3, 6–4
Wuhan; Premier 5 (September 22 – September 28)	Women's doubles	(Switzerland) Martina Hingis (Italy) Flavia Pennetta	(Zimbabwe) Cara Black (France) Caroline Garcia	6–4, 5–7, [12–10]

1. Due to her results in Wuhan, Kvitová became the fourth woman to qualify for the WTA Tour Championships. This was her fourth consecutive year qualifying for the event.

ATP Tour 500/WTA Premier Mandatory	Category	Champion(s)	Finalist(s)	Score in the final
Beijing (September 29 – October 5)	Men's singles	(Serbia) Novak Djokovic	(Czech Republic) Tomáš Berdych	6–0, 6–2
Beijing (September 29 – October 5)	Women's singles	(Russia) Maria Sharapova	(Czech Republic) Petra Kvitová	6–4, 2–6, 6–3
Beijing (September 29 – October 5)	Men's doubles	(Netherlands) Jean-Julien Rojer (Romania) Horia Tecău	(France) Julien Benneteau (Canada) Vasek Pospisil	6–7(6), 7–5, [10–5]
Beijing (September 29 – October 5)	Women's doubles	(Czech Republic) Andrea Hlaváčková (China) Peng Shuai	(Zimbabwe) Cara Black (India) Sania Mirza	6–4, 6–4

=== October ===
- Seven ATP tournaments, five WTA tournaments, and both season-ending championships on the WTA Tour were scheduled in October.
- Roger Federer beats Gilles Simon to win the Shanghai Rolex Masters for the first time in his career.
- Andy Murray beats Tommy Robredo to win the Valencia Open again saving match points.
- Roger Federer beats David Goffin to win the Swiss Indoors marking the first time since 2011 that Federer has won it.
- After outside contenders, Angelique Kerber and Ekaterina Makarova both lost in the third round in Beijing, the final four spots of the WTA Finals were filled. Eugenie Bouchard, Agnieszka Radwańska, Ana Ivanovic, and Caroline Wozniacki completed the field.
- Serena Williams wins the WTA Finals dominating Simona Halep in the final after having already been beaten by her in the Round Robin stage and nearly getting knocked out of the semifinals against Caroline Wozniacki to end the year at No. 1 for the fourth time.

ATP World Tour 1000	Category	Champion(s)	Finalist(s)	Score in the final
Shanghai (October 6 – October 12)	Men's singles	(Switzerland) Roger Federer	(France) Gilles Simon	7–6^{(8–6)}, 7–6^{(7–2)}
Shanghai (October 6 – October 12)	Men's doubles	(United States) Bob Bryan (United States) Mike Bryan	(France) Julien Benneteau (France) Édouard Roger-Vasselin	6–3, 7–6^{(7–3)}
Paris (October 27 – November 2)	Men's singles	(Serbia) Novak Djokovic	(Canada) Milos Raonic	6–2, 6–3
Paris (October 27 – November 2)	Men's doubles	(United States) Bob Bryan (United States) Mike Bryan	(Poland) Marcin Matkowski (Austria) Jürgen Melzer	7–6^{(7–5)}, 5–7, [10–6]

ATP World Tour 500	Category	Champion(s)	Finalist(s)	Score in the final
Valencia (October 20 – October 26)	Men's singles	(United Kingdom) Andy Murray	(Spain) Tommy Robredo	3–6, 7–6^{(9–7)}, 7–6^{(10–8)}
Valencia (October 20 – October 26)	Men's doubles	(Netherlands) Jean-Julien Rojer (Romania) Horia Tecău	(South Africa) Kevin Anderson (tennis) (France) Jérémy Chardy	6–4, 6–2
Basel (October 20 – October 26)	Men's singles	(Switzerland) Roger Federer	(Belgium) David Goffin	6–2, 6–2
Basel (October 20 – October 26)	Men's doubles	(Canada) Vasek Pospisil (Serbia) Nenad Zimonjić	(Croatia) Marin Draganja (Finland) Henri Kontinen	7–6^{(15–13)}, 1–6, [10–5]

Year-End Championship	Category	Champion(s)	Finalist(s)	Score in the final
Tour Championships – Singapore (October 20 – October 26)	Women's singles	(United States) Serena Williams	(Romania) Simona Halep	6–3, 6–0
Tour Championships – Singapore (October 20 – October 26)	Women's doubles	(Zimbabwe) Cara Black (India) Sania Mirza	(Chinese Taipei) Hsieh Su-wei (China) Peng Shuai	6–1, 6–0
Tournament of Champions – Sofia (October 27 – November 2)	Women's singles	(Germany) Andrea Petkovic	(Italy) Flavia Pennetta	1–6, 6–4, 6–3

=== November ===
- Novak Djokovic wins the ATP World Tour Finals after Roger Federer withdraws from the final due to a back injury.
- Roger Federer helps Switzerland win the Davis Cup for the first time.

Year-End Championship	Category	Champion(s)	Finalist(s)	Score in the final
Tour Finals – London (November 10 – November 16)	Men's singles	(Serbia) Novak Djokovic	(Switzerland) Roger Federer	w/o
Tour Finals – London (November 10 – November 16)	Men's doubles	(United States) Bob Bryan (United States) Mike Bryan	(Croatia) Ivan Dodig (Brazil) Marcelo Melo	6–7^{(5–7)}, 6–2, [10–7]

=== December ===
- No ATP or WTA tournaments were scheduled in December.

== International Tennis Hall of Fame ==
- Class of 2014:
  - Lindsay Davenport, player
  - Chantal Vandierendonck, player
  - John Barrett, contributor
  - Nick Bollettieri, contributor
  - Jane Grimes Brown, contributor
