= 2014 BB&T Atlanta Open – Doubles =

Doubles
- 2014 BB&T Atlanta Open

Final
- Champions: (Canada) Vasek Pospisil (United States) Jack Sock
- Runners-up: (United States) Steve Johnson (United States) Sam Querrey
- Score: 6–3, 5–7, [10–5]

Events
Singles	Doubles
← 2013 ·	BB&T Atlanta Open	· 2015 →

Édouard Roger-Vasselin and Igor Sijsling were the defending champions, but chose not to participate.
Vasek Pospisil and Jack Sock won the title, defeating Steve Johnson and Sam Querrey in the final, 6–3, 5–7, [10–5].

== Seeds ==
1. (Canada) Vasek Pospisil / (United States) Jack Sock (champions)
2. (Mexico) Santiago González / (United States) Scott Lipsky (quarterfinals)
3. (Australia) Chris Guccione / (Australia) John-Patrick Smith (quarterfinals)
4. (United Kingdom) Ken Skupski / (United Kingdom) Neal Skupski (first round)

== Draw ==
Key

- Q = Qualifier
- WC = Wild card
- LL = Lucky loser
- Alt = Alternate
- ITF = ITF entry
- PR = Protected ranking
- SR = Special ranking
- SE = Special exempt
- JE = Junior exempt
- JR = Junior Accelerator Programme entrant
- CO = College Accelerator Programme entrant
- NG = Next Gen Accelerator Program entrant
- w/o = Walkover
- r = Retired
- d = Defaulted

=== Draw ===
First round
1	(Canada) V Pospisil (United States) J Sock	6	6
(Colombia) A González (Colombia) JC Spir	4	4
WC	(United States) K Lovett (United States) B O'Shaughnessey	2	0
(Germany) B Becker (Germany) F Moser	6	6
3	(Australia) C Guccione (Australia) J-P Smith	3	6	[10]
(Israel) J Erlich (United States) R Ram	6	3	[6]
(Colombia) N Barrientos (Dominican Republic) V Estrella Burgos	6^{2}	6	[10]
(Thailand) Sa Ratiwatana (Thailand) So Ratiwatana	7^{7}	3	[8]
(India) D Sharan (United States) D Young	1	6	[9]
(United States) K King (New Zealand) M Venus	6	3	[11]
WC	(United States) R Ginepri (United States) R Harrison	4	6	[11]
4	(United Kingdom) K Skupski (United Kingdom) N Skupski	6	3	[9]
(United States) S Johnson (United States) S Querrey	7	6
(Uzbekistan) D Istomin (Australia) M Matosevic	5	4
(Australia) M Ebden (Chinese Taipei) Y-h Lu
2	(Mexico) S González (United States) S Lipsky	w/o

Quarterfinals
1	(Canada) V Pospisil (United States) J Sock	6	6
(Germany) B Becker (Germany) F Moser	4	1
3	(Australia) C Guccione (Australia) J-P Smith	5	6	[6]
(Colombia) N Barrientos (Dominican Republic) V Estrella Burgos	7	4	[10]
(United States) K King (New Zealand) M Venus	w/o
WC	(United States) R Ginepri (United States) R Harrison
(United States) S Johnson (United States) S Querrey	7^{7}	7
2	(Mexico) S González (United States) S Lipsky	6^{2}	5

Semifinals
1	(Canada) V Pospisil (United States) J Sock	6	6
(Colombia) N Barrientos (Dominican Republic) V Estrella Burgos	3	2
(United States) K King (New Zealand) M Venus	7^{8}	5	[7]
(United States) S Johnson (United States) S Querrey	6^{6}	7	[10]

Final
1	(Canada) V Pospisil (United States) J Sock	6	5	[10]
(United States) S Johnson (United States) S Querrey	3	7	[5]
