= 2014 BB&T Atlanta Open – Singles =

Singles
- 2014 BB&T Atlanta Open

Final
- Champion: (United States) John Isner
- Runner-up: (Israel) Dudi Sela
- Score: 6–3, 6–4

Details
- Draw: 28 (4 Q / 3 WC )
- Seeds: 8

Events
| Singles | Doubles |
- BB&T Atlanta Open

John Isner was the defending champion and successfully defended the title, defeating Dudi Sela in the final, 6–3, 6–4.

== Seeds ==
The top four seeds receive a bye into the second round.

1. (United States) John Isner (champion)
2. (South Africa) Kevin Anderson (second round)
3. (France) Gaël Monfils (withdrew due to right knee injury)
4. (Canada) Vasek Pospisil (quarterfinals)
5. (Czech Republic) Radek Štěpánek (withdrew due to left harmstring injury)
6. (Uzbekistan) Denis Istomin (second round)
7. (Chinese Taipei) Lu Yen-hsun (second round)
8. (Australia) Marinko Matosevic (quarterfinals)
9. (United States) Sam Querrey (second round)

== Draw ==
Key

- Q = Qualifier
- WC = Wild card
- LL = Lucky loser
- Alt = Alternate
- ITF = ITF entry
- PR = Protected ranking
- SR = Special ranking
- SE = Special exempt
- JE = Junior exempt
- JR = Junior Accelerator Programme entrant
- CO = College Accelerator Programme entrant
- NG = Next Gen Accelerator Program entrant
- w/o = Walkover
- r = Retired
- d = Defaulted

=== Finals ===
Semifinals
1 | (United States) John Isner | 7 | 6
(United States) Jack Sock | 5 | 4
(Israel) Dudi Sela | 6 | 3 | 6
(Germany) Benjamin Becker | 3 | 6 | 3

Final
1 | (United States) John Isner | 6 | 6
(Israel) Dudi Sela | 3 | 4

=== Top half ===
First round
WC | (United States) R Ginepri | 7^{7} | 3 | 6
(Ukraine) S Stakhovsky | 6^{3} | 6 | 0
(United States) T Smyczek | 6 | 6
WC | (United States) R Harrison | 0 | 2
(Dominican Republic) V Estrella Burgos | 0 | 2
8 | (Australia) M Matosevic | 6 | 6
(United States) J Sock | 6 | 6
(Colombia) A González | 2 | 4
(Slovakia) L Lacko | 6 | 7
WC | (United States) N Pasha | 2 | 5
LL | (United States) R Ram | 1 | 4
6 | (Uzbekistan) D Istomin | 6 | 6

Second round
1 | (United States) J Isner | 4 | 7^{7} | 7
WC | (United States) R Ginepri | 6 | 6^{5} | 5
(United States) T Smyczek | 4 | 5
8 | (Australia) M Matosevic | 6 | 7
Q | (New Zealand) M Venus | 4 | 2
(United States) J Sock | 6 | 6
(Slovakia) L Lacko | 5 | 6 | 6
6 | (Uzbekistan) D Istomin | 7 | 1 | 4

Quarterfinals
1 | (United States) J Isner | 7^{10} | 6
8 | (Australia) M Matosevic | 6^{8} | 4
(United States) J Sock | 7^{8} | 6
(Slovakia) L Lacko | 6^{6} | 2

Semifinals
1 | (United States) J Isner | 7 | 6
(United States) J Sock | 5 | 4

=== Bottom half ===
First round
9 | (United States) S Querrey | 7^{7} | 7
(United States) S Johnson | 6^{3} | 5
(United States) D Young | 3 | 0
(Israel) D Sela | 6 | 6
Q | (Australia) J-P Smith | 4 | 4
Q | (Ukraine) I Marchenko | 6 | 6
7 | (Chinese Taipei) Y-h Lu | 6 | 6
LL | (United States) A Kuznetsov | 4 | 4
(Australia) M Ebden | 4 | 2
(Germany) B Becker | 6 | 6
Q | (Canada) S Diez | 1 | 2
LL | (Netherlands) T de Bakker | 6 | 6

Second round
9 | (United States) S Querrey | 2 | 4
(Israel) D Sela | 6 | 6
Q | (Ukraine) I Marchenko | 5 | 3
4 | (Canada) V Pospisil | 7 | 6
7 | (Chinese Taipei) Y-h Lu | 4 | 3
(Germany) B Becker | 6 | 6
LL | (Netherlands) T de Bakker | 6 | 7
2 | (South Africa) K Anderson | 4 | 5

Quarterfinals
(Israel) D Sela | 7 | 1 | 6
4 | (Canada) V Pospisil | 5 | 6 | 2
(Germany) B Becker | 6 | 6
LL | (Netherlands) T de Bakker | 4 | 2

Semifinals
(Israel) D Sela | 6 | 3 | 6
(Germany) B Becker | 3 | 6 | 3

== Qualifying ==
=== Seeds ===
1. (Netherlands) Thiemo de Bakker (qualifying competition, Lucky loser)
2. (United States) Alex Kuznetsov (qualifying competition, Lucky loser)
3. (United States) Rajeev Ram (qualifying competition, Lucky loser)
4. (Australia) John-Patrick Smith (qualified)
5. (Ukraine) Illya Marchenko (qualified)
6. (Canada) Steven Diez (qualified)
7. (United States) Kevin King (qualifying competition)
8. (New Zealand) Michael Venus (qualified)

=== Qualifiers ===
1. (Canada) Steven Diez
2. (Ukraine) Illya Marchenko
3. (New Zealand) Michael Venus
4. (Australia) John-Patrick Smith

=== Lucky losers ===
1. (Netherlands) Thiemo de Bakker
2. (United States) Alex Kuznetsov
3. (United States) Rajeev Ram

=== Qualifying draw ===
==== First qualifier ====
| First round | | | | | Second round | | | | | Qualifying competition |
| | | | | | 1 | (Netherlands) Thiemo de Bakker | 6 | 4 | 6 |
| | (Argentina) Facundo Mena | 6^{6} | 6 | 6 | | (Argentina) Facundo Mena | 2 | 6 | 4 |
| WC | (United States) Korey Lovett | 7^{8} | 4 | 2 | | | | | | 1 | (Netherlands) Thiemo de Bakker | 7^{7} | 0^{r} |
| (United States) Ryan Shane | | 4 | 7^{7} | 6 | | | | | | 6 | (Canada) Steven Diez | 6^{5} | 2 |
| (Germany) Frank Moser | | 6 | 6^{4} | 1 | | (United States) Ryan Shane | 3 | 5 |
| | | | | | 6 | (Canada) Steven Diez | 6 | 7 |

==== Second qualifier ====
| First round | | | | Second round | | | | Qualifying competition |
| | | | | 2 | (United States) Alex Kuznetsov | 6 | 6 |
| | (United States) Michael Shabaz | 6 | 6 | | (United States) Michael Shabaz | 3 | 2 |
| WC | (United States) Nathan Rakitt | 2 | 1 | | | | | 2 | (United States) Alex Kuznetsov | 3 | 6 | 3 |
| (United Kingdom) Neal Skupski | | 6^{2} | 2 | | | | | 5 | (Ukraine) Illya Marchenko | 6 | 3 | 6 |
| (South Africa) Fritz Wolmarans | | 7^{7} | 6 | | (South Africa) Fritz Wolmarans | 4 | 3 |
| | | | | 5 | (Ukraine) Illya Marchenko | 6 | 6 |

==== Third qualifier ====
| First round | | | | Second round | | | | | Qualifying competition |
| | | | | 3 | (United States) Rajeev Ram | 6 | 6 |
| (United States) Jean-Yves Aubone | | 6 | 7^{7} | | (United States) Jean-Yves Aubone | 3 | 2 |
| (United Kingdom) Ken Skupski | | 3 | 6^{3} | | | | | | 3 | (United States) Rajeev Ram | 7 | 3 | 5 |
| | (Monaco) Benjamin Balleret | 4 | 2 | | | | | | 8 | (New Zealand) Michael Venus | 5 | 6 | 7 |
| WC | (United States) Francis Tiafoe | 6 | 6 | WC | (United States) Francis Tiafoe | 3 | 7^{7} | 6^{3} |
| | | | | 8 | (New Zealand) Michael Venus | 6 | 6^{3} | 7^{7} |

==== Fourth qualifier ====
| First round | | | | | Second round | | | | Qualifying competition |
| | | | | | 4 | (Australia) John-Patrick Smith | 7^{9} | 7^{7} |
| (Colombia) Juan Carlos Spir | | 7^{7} | 6^{4} | 6 | | (Colombia) Juan Carlos Spir | 6^{7} | 6^{5} |
| (United States) Andrew Carter | | 6^{5} | 7^{7} | 1 | | | | | 4 | (Australia) John-Patrick Smith | 6 | 6 |
| WC | (United States) Becker O'Shaughnessey | 6 | 6 | | | | | | 7 | (United States) Kevin King | 2 | 1 |
| | (Mexico) Santiago González | 4 | 2 | | WC | (United States) Becker O'Shaughnessey | 3 | 2 |
| | | | | | 7 | (United States) Kevin King | 6 | 6 |
