= 2014 BB&T Atlanta Open =

- Date: 19–27 July
- Edition: 27th
- Surface: Hard / outdoor
- Location: Atlanta, United States
- Venue: Atlantic Station

Champions

Singles
- (United States) John Isner

Doubles
- (Canada) Vasek Pospisil / (United States) Jack Sock
- Atlanta Open

The 2014 BB&T Atlanta Open was a professional tennis tournament played on hard courts. It was the 27th edition of the tournament, and part of the 2014 ATP World Tour. It took place at Atlantic Station in Atlanta, United States between 19 and 27 July 2014. It was the first men's event of the 2014 US Open Series.

== Singles main-draw entrants ==
=== Seeds ===
Country	Player	Rank^{1}	Seed
USA	John Isner	12	1
RSA	Kevin Anderson	17	2
~~FRA~~	~~Gaël Monfils~~	~~23~~	~~3~~
CAN	Vasek Pospisil	34	4
~~CZE~~	~~Radek Štěpánek~~	~~39~~	~~5~~
UZB	Denis Istomin	40	6
TPE	Lu Yen-hsun	47	7
AUS	Marinko Matosevic	52	8
USA	Sam Querrey	62	9

- ^{1} Rankings are as of July 14, 2014

=== Other entrants ===
The following players received wildcards into the singles main draw:

- (United States) Robby Ginepri
- (United States) Ryan Harrison
- (United States) Nathan Pasha

The following players received entry from the qualifying draw:

- (Canada) Steven Diez
- (Ukraine) Illya Marchenko
- (Australia) John-Patrick Smith
- (New Zealand) Michael Venus

The following players received entry as lucky losers:

- (Netherlands) Thiemo de Bakker
- (United States) Alex Kuznetsov
- (United States) Rajeev Ram

=== Withdrawals ===
Before the tournament

- (Croatia) Ivan Dodig
- (France) Richard Gasquet
- (Australia) Lleyton Hewitt
- (Croatia) Ivo Karlović (fatigue)
- (United States) Bradley Klahn
- (France) Gaël Monfils (right knee injury)
- (Czech Republic) Radek Štěpánek (left harmstring injury)
- (Russia) Dmitry Tursunov

== ATP doubles main-draw entrants ==
=== Seeds ===
Country	Player	Country	Player	Rank^{1}	Seed
CAN	Vasek Pospisil	USA	Jack Sock	64	1
MEX	Santiago González	USA	Scott Lipsky	83	2
AUS	Chris Guccione	AUS	John-Patrick Smith	130	3
GBR	Ken Skupski	GBR	Neal Skupski	137	4

- ^{1} Rankings are as of July 14, 2014

=== Other entrants ===
The following pairs received wildcards into the doubles main draw:

- (United States) Robby Ginepri / (United States) Ryan Harrison
- (United States) Korey Lovett / (United States) Becker O'Shaughnessey

=== Withdrawals ===
Before the tournament

- (Australia) Matthew Ebden

During the tournament

- (United States) Ryan Harrison (foot injury)

== Finals ==
=== Singles ===
- (United States) John Isner defeated (Israel) Dudi Sela, 6–3, 6–4

=== Doubles ===
- (Canada) Vasek Pospisil / (United States) Jack Sock defeated (United States) Steve Johnson / (United States) Sam Querrey, 6–3, 5–7, [10–5]
