= 2014 US Open (tennis) =

- Date: August 25 – September 8
- Edition: 134th
- Category: Grand Slam (ITF)
- Draw: 128S/64D/32X
- Prize money: $38,251,760
- Surface: Hard
- Location: New York City, United States
- Venue: USTA Billie Jean King National Tennis Center
- Attendance: 713,642

Champions

Men's singles
- (Croatia) Marin Čilić

Women's singles
- (United States) Serena Williams

Men's doubles
- (United States) Bob Bryan / (United States) Mike Bryan

Women's doubles
- (Russia) Ekaterina Makarova / (Russia) Elena Vesnina

Mixed doubles
- (India) Sania Mirza / (Brazil) Bruno Soares

Wheelchair men's singles
- (Japan) Shingo Kunieda

Wheelchair women's singles
- (Japan) Yui Kamiji

Wheelchair quad singles
- (United Kingdom) Andrew Lapthorne

Wheelchair men's doubles
- (France) Stéphane Houdet / (Japan) Shingo Kunieda

Wheelchair women's doubles
- (Japan) Yui Kamiji / (United Kingdom) Jordanne Whiley

Wheelchair quad doubles
- (United States) Nick Taylor / (United States) David Wagner

Boys' singles
- (Australia) Omar Jasika

Girls' singles
- (Czech Republic) Marie Bouzková

Boys' doubles
- (Australia) Omar Jasika / (Japan) Naoki Nakagawa

Girls' doubles
- (Turkey) İpek Soylu / (Switzerland) Jil Teichmann
- US Open

The 2014 US Open was a tennis tournament played on outdoor hard courts. It was the 134th edition of the US Open, the fourth and final Grand Slam event of the year. It took place at the USTA Billie Jean King National Tennis Center.

Rafael Nadal was the defending champion in the men's event; however, on August 18, the Spaniard announced his withdrawal from the event after failing to recover from a wrist injury, while Serena Williams was the two-time defending champion in the women's event.

In the men's singles competition, Marin Čilić won his first grand slam, while Serena Williams won her Open era record-tying sixth title in the women's singles competition, tying Chris Evert, and her eighteenth grand slam title, tying Evert and Martina Navratilova. Winning the men's doubles, Bob Bryan and Mike Bryan became the most victorious doubles team in Open era history at the tournament, and this was the team's 100th title together and sixteenth grand slam title tying Todd Woodbridge for the Open era record. Ekaterina Makarova and Elena Vesnina won women's doubles competition title, becoming two-time grand slam champions with their victory at the 2013 French Open. The winning mixed doubles team was Sania Mirza and Bruno Soares, and for Mirza it was her third mixed doubles grand slam title in her career and Soares' second grand slam title for his career. It was Soares' second US Open title in mixed doubles, and it was the first for Mirza.

== Tournament ==
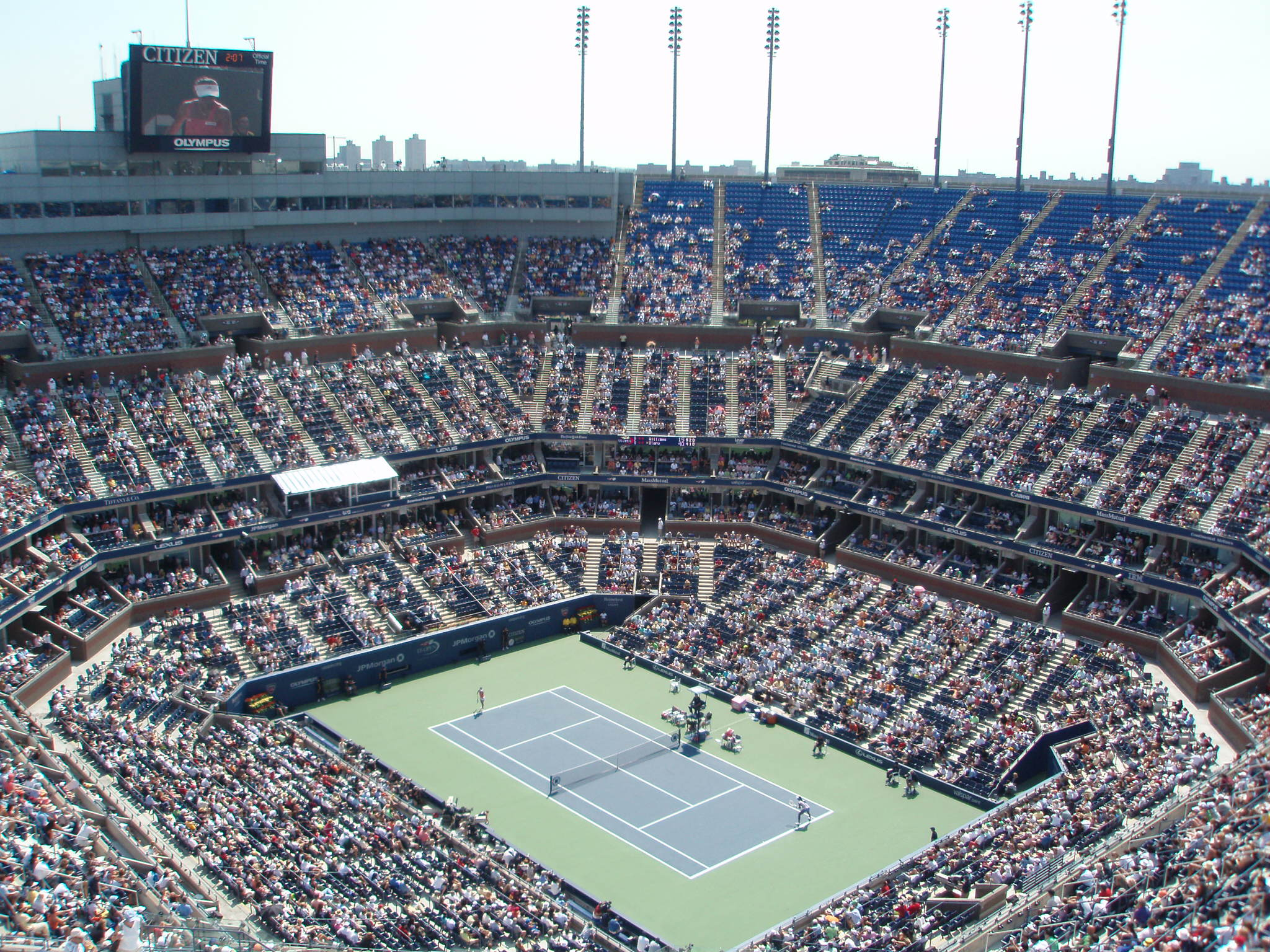
Arthur Ashe Stadium where the Finals of US Open take place

The 2014 US Open was the 134th edition of the tournament and it is held at the USTA Billie Jean King National Tennis Center in Flushing Meadows–Corona Park of Queens in New York City, United States.

The tournament was an event run by the International Tennis Federation (ITF) and was part of the 2014 ATP World Tour and the 2014 WTA Tour calendars under the Grand Slam category. The tournament consisted of both men's and women's singles and doubles draws as well as a mixed doubles event. There were singles and doubles events for both boys and girls (players under 18), which was part of the Grade A category of tournaments, and singles, doubles and quad events for men's and women's wheelchair tennis players as part of the NEC tour under the Grand Slam category.

The tournament was played on hard courts and is taking place over a series of 17 courts with DecoTurf surface, including the three main showcourts, Arthur Ashe Stadium, Louis Armstrong Stadium and Grandstand.

== Notable events ==
- In winning the women's singles, Serena Williams tied a number of Open Era records:
  - It was her sixth title tying fellow American Chris Evert.
  - It was her eighteenth grand slam singles title tying the American record held by Evert and Martina Navratilova.
- In winning the men's doubles, Bob and Mike Bryan reached a number of major milestones:
  - It was their 100th ATP World Tour title as a team.
  - This was their fifth US Open title, taking them past Bob Lutz and Stan Smith for the most in the Open era, and drawing them level with 1880s players Richard Sears and James Dwight for the most overall.
  - They also extended their own records for most Grand Slam titles as a team (16) and most consecutive seasons with at least one Grand Slam title (10).
  - The men's singles final represented the first time a Grand Slam men's singles final had not featured a member of the "Big Four" since the 2005 Australian Open.

== Broadcast ==
The tournament was scheduled to be broadcast in more than 200 countries around the world. In the United States the tournament was broadcast live on CBS, ESPN, and Tennis Channel. CBS ended its 47-year tenure as the broadcast home of the Open. Beginning in 2015, ESPN will have the exclusive television rights to all USTA events, including the Open and the US Open Series.

In 2014, live coverage emanated from seven courts, including Arthur Ashe Stadium, Louis Armstrong Stadium and the Grandstand, as well as Court 5, Court 11, Court 13, and Court 17.

== Point and prize money distribution ==
=== Point distribution ===
Below is a series of tables for each of the competitions showing the ranking points on offer for each event.

==== Senior ====
Event	W	F	SF	QF	Round of 16	Round of 32	Round of 64	Round of 128	Q	Q3	Q2	Q1
Men's singles	2000	1200	720	360	180	90	45	10	25	16	8	0
Men's doubles	2000	1200	720	360	180	90	0	—N/a	—N/a	—N/a	—N/a	—N/a
Women's singles	2000	1300	780	430	240	130	70	10	40	30	20	2
Women's doubles	2000	1300	780	430	240	130	10	—N/a	—N/a	—N/a	—N/a	—N/a

==== Wheelchair ====
Event	W	F	SF/3rd	QF/4th
Singles	800	500	375	100
Doubles	800	500	100	—N/a
Quad singles	800	500	375	100
Quad doubles	800	100	—N/a	—N/a

==== Junior ====
Event	W	F	SF	QF	Round of 16	Round of 32	Q	Q3
Boys' singles	375	270	180	120	75	30	25	20
Girls' singles	375	270	180	120	75	30	25	20
Boys' doubles	270	180	120	75	45	—N/a	—N/a	—N/a
Girls' doubles	270	180	120	75	45	—N/a	—N/a	—N/a

=== Prize money ===
The US Open total prize money for 2014 was increased by 11.7 percent to a record $38,251,760, which potentially could reach over 40 million dollars, as the top three finishers in the Emirates Airline US Open Series may earn up to an additional $2.6 million in bonus money at the US Open.

Event	W	F	SF	QF	Round of 16	Round of 32	Round of 64	Round of 128	Q3	Q2	Q1
Singles	$3,000,000	$1,450,000	$730,000	$370,250	$187,300	$105,090	$60,420	$35,754	$13,351	$8,781	$4,551
Doubles *	$520,000	$250,000	$124,450	$62,060	$32,163	$20,063	$13,375	—N/a	—N/a	—N/a	—N/a
Mixed doubles *	$150,000	$70,000	$30,000	$15,000	$10,000	$5,000	—N/a	—N/a	—N/a	—N/a	—N/a

_{* per team}

==== Bonus prize money ====
Top three players in the 2014 US Open Series received bonus prize money, depending on where they finish in the 2014 US Open, according to money schedule below.

2014 Emirates Airline US Open Series Finish	2014 US Open Finish								Awardees	
2014 Emirates Airline US Open Series Finish	W	F	SF	QF	Round of 16	Round of 32	Round of 64	Round of 128	Awardees	
1st place	$1,000,000	$500,000	$250,000	$125,000	$70,000	$40,000	$25,000	$15,000	(Canada) Milos Raonic	$70,000
1st place	$1,000,000	$500,000	$250,000	$125,000	$70,000	$40,000	$25,000	$15,000	(United States) Serena Williams	$1,000,000
2nd place	$500,000	$250,000	$125,000	$62,500	$35,000	$20,000	$12,500	$7,500	(United States) John Isner	$20,000
2nd place	$500,000	$250,000	$125,000	$62,500	$35,000	$20,000	$12,500	$7,500	(Germany) Angelique Kerber	$20,000
3rd place	$250,000	$125,000	$62,500	$31,250	$17,500	$10,000	$6,250	$3,750	(Switzerland) Roger Federer	$62,500
3rd place	$250,000	$125,000	$62,500	$31,250	$17,500	$10,000	$6,250	$3,750	(Poland) Agnieszka Radwańska	$6,250

== Singles players ==
2014 US Open – Men's singles

Champion		Runner-up	
(Croatia) Marin Čilić [14]		(Japan) Kei Nishikori [10]	
Semifinals out
(Serbia) Novak Djokovic [1]		(Switzerland) Roger Federer [2]	
Quarterfinals out
(United Kingdom) Andy Murray [8]	(Switzerland) Stan Wawrinka [3]	(Czech Republic) Tomáš Berdych [6]	(France) Gaël Monfils [20]
4th round out
(Germany) Philipp Kohlschreiber [22]	(France) Jo-Wilfried Tsonga [9]	(Spain) Tommy Robredo [16]	(Canada) Milos Raonic [5]
(Austria) Dominic Thiem	(France) Gilles Simon [26]	(Bulgaria) Grigor Dimitrov [7]	(Spain) Roberto Bautista Agut [17]
3rd round out
(United States) Sam Querrey	(United States) John Isner [13]	(Spain) Pablo Carreño	(Russia) Andrey Kuznetsov
(Slovenia) Blaž Kavčič	(Australia) Nick Kyrgios	(Argentina) Leonardo Mayer [23]	(Dominican Republic) Víctor Estrella Burgos
(Russia) Teymuraz Gabashvili	(Spain) Feliciano López [19]	(South Africa) Kevin Anderson [18]	(Spain) David Ferrer [4]
(Belgium) David Goffin	(France) Richard Gasquet [12]	(France) Adrian Mannarino	(Spain) Marcel Granollers
2nd round out
(France) Paul-Henri Mathieu	(Spain) Guillermo García López [28]	(France) Michaël Llodra (WC)	(Germany) Jan-Lennard Struff
(Kazakhstan) Aleksandr Nedovyesov	(France) Benoît Paire	(Spain) Fernando Verdasco [31]	(Germany) Matthias Bachinger (Q)
(Brazil) Thomaz Bellucci	(France) Jérémy Chardy [30]	(Italy) Andreas Seppi	(Italy) Simone Bolelli
(Spain) Pablo Andújar	(Australia) Matthew Ebden	(Croatia) Borna Ćorić (Q)	(Germany) Peter Gojowczyk (Q)
(Slovakia) Martin Kližan	(Russia) Alexander Kudryavtsev (Q)	(Japan) Tatsuma Ito (Q)	(Latvia) Ernests Gulbis [11]
(Ukraine) Illya Marchenko (Q)	(Poland) Jerzy Janowicz	(Argentina) Federico Delbonis	(Australia) Bernard Tomic (WC)
(Israel) Dudi Sela	(Portugal) João Sousa [32]	(Colombia) Alejandro González	(Italy) Paolo Lorenzi
(Italy) Fabio Fognini [15]	(United States) Tim Smyczek (WC)	(Croatia) Ivo Karlović [25]	(Australia) Samuel Groth
1st round out
(Argentina) Diego Schwartzman	(Luxembourg) Gilles Müller	(Argentina) Máximo González	(Chinese Taipei) Lu Yen-hsun
(Argentina) Facundo Bagnis (Q)	(Spain) Daniel Gimeno Traver	(Kazakhstan) Mikhail Kukushkin	(United States) Marcos Giron (WC)
(Argentina) Juan Mónaco	(Republic of Ireland) James McGee (Q)	(Germany) Andreas Beck (Q)	(France) Julien Benneteau [24]
(Slovenia) Blaž Rola	(United States) Bradley Klahn	(Czech Republic) Radek Štěpánek	(Netherlands) Robin Haase
(Czech Republic) Jiří Veselý	(France) Nicolas Mahut	(United States) Donald Young	(Colombia) Alejandro Falla
(Russia) Mikhail Youzhny [21]	(Ukraine) Sergiy Stakhovsky	(Canada) Vasek Pospisil	(France) Édouard Roger-Vasselin
(United States) Wayne Odesnik (WC)	(United States) Jack Sock	(Germany) Tobias Kamke	(Spain) Albert Montañés
(Czech Republic) Lukáš Rosol [29]	(Netherlands) Igor Sijsling	(Germany) Benjamin Becker	(Japan) Taro Daniel (Q)
(Australia) Lleyton Hewitt	(Belgium) Steve Darcis (Q)	(Russia) Evgeny Donskoy	(Colombia) Santiago Giraldo [27]
(Croatia) Ivan Dodig	(United States) Steve Johnson	(Slovakia) Lukáš Lacko	(France) Kenny de Schepper
(Cyprus) Marcos Baghdatis	(Switzerland) Marco Chiudinelli (Q)	(Serbia) Dušan Lajović	(Uruguay) Pablo Cuevas
(Moldova) Radu Albot (Q)	(United States) Noah Rubin (WC)	(Germany) Dustin Brown	(Bosnia and Herzegovina) Damir Džumhur
(United States) Ryan Harrison (Q)	(Argentina) Carlos Berlocq	(Belgium) Niels Desein (Q)	(Canada) Frank Dancevic
(United States) Jared Donaldson (WC)	(Russia) Dmitry Tursunov	(Japan) Yoshihito Nishioka (Q)	(Uzbekistan) Denis Istomin
(Kazakhstan) Andrey Golubev	(Spain) Pere Riba	(Serbia) Filip Krajinović (Q)	(Austria) Andreas Haider-Maurer
(Finland) Jarkko Nieminen	(Austria) Jürgen Melzer	(Spain) Albert Ramos	(Australia) Marinko Matosevic

2014 US Open – Women's singles

Champion		Runner-up	
(United States) Serena Williams [1]		(Denmark) Caroline Wozniacki [10]	
Semifinals out
(Russia) Ekaterina Makarova [17]		(China) Peng Shuai	
Quarterfinals out
(Italy) Flavia Pennetta [11]	(Belarus) Victoria Azarenka [16]	(Switzerland) Belinda Bencic	(Italy) Sara Errani [13]
4th round out
(Estonia) Kaia Kanepi	(Australia) Casey Dellacqua [29]	(Serbia) Aleksandra Krunić (Q)	(Canada) Eugenie Bouchard [7]
(Serbia) Jelena Janković [9]	(Czech Republic) Lucie Šafářová [14]	(Russia) Maria Sharapova [5]	(Croatia) Mirjana Lučić-Baroni (Q)
3rd round out
(United States) Varvara Lepchenko	(Spain) Carla Suárez Navarro [15]	(United States) Nicole Gibbs (WC)	(Czech Republic) Karolína Plíšková
(Czech Republic) Petra Kvitová [3]	(Russia) Elena Vesnina	(Kazakhstan) Zarina Diyas	(Czech Republic) Barbora Záhlavová-Strýcová [30]
(Germany) Angelique Kerber [6]	(Sweden) Johanna Larsson	(France) Alizé Cornet [22]	(Italy) Roberta Vinci [28]
(Germany) Sabine Lisicki [26]	(Germany) Andrea Petkovic [18]	(United States) Venus Williams [19]	(Romania) Simona Halep [2]
2nd round out
(United States) Vania King	(Germany) Mona Barthel	(Australia) Samantha Stosur [24]	(United States) CoCo Vandeweghe
(United States) Shelby Rogers	(Russia) Anastasia Pavlyuchenkova [23]	(China) Wang Qiang (Q)	(Serbia) Ana Ivanovic [8]
(Czech Republic) Petra Cetkovská	(United States) Madison Keys [27]	(New Zealand) Marina Erakovic	(United States) Christina McHale
(United States) Catherine Bellis (WC)	(Slovenia) Polona Hercog	(Romania) Monica Niculescu	(Romania) Sorana Cîrstea
(Russia) Alla Kudryavtseva (Q)	(Japan) Kurumi Nara [31]	(United States) Sloane Stephens [21]	(Bulgaria) Tsvetana Pironkova
(China) Zheng Saisai (Q)	(Slovakia) Daniela Hantuchová	(Romania) Irina-Camelia Begu	(Poland) Agnieszka Radwańska [4]
(Romania) Alexandra Dulgheru	(United States) Madison Brengle (WC)	(Puerto Rico) Monica Puig	(Belarus) Aliaksandra Sasnovich (Q)
(Australia) Anastasia Rodionova (Q)	(Switzerland) Timea Bacsinszky	(Israel) Shahar Pe'er	(Slovakia) Jana Čepelová
1st round out
(United States) Taylor Townsend (WC)	(Italy) Francesca Schiavone	(Belgium) Alison Van Uytvanck	(China) Zhang Shuai [32]
(United States) Lauren Davis	(France) Pauline Parmentier	(Croatia) Donna Vekić	(Australia) Ajla Tomljanović
(Germany) Julia Görges	(Ukraine) Maryna Zanevska (Q)	(France) Caroline Garcia	(Brazil) Teliana Pereira
(Austria) Patricia Mayr-Achleitner	(Poland) Paula Kania (Q)	(Austria) Yvonne Meusburger	(United States) Alison Riske
(France) Kristina Mladenovic	(Czech Republic) Klára Koukalová	(Poland) Katarzyna Piter	(Australia) Jarmila Gajdošová (WC)
(Russia) Svetlana Kuznetsova [20]	(Chinese Taipei) Chan Yung-jan (Q)	(South Africa) Chanelle Scheepers	(Japan) Misaki Doi
(Slovakia) Dominika Cibulková [12]	(Ukraine) Lesia Tsurenko (Q)	(Ukraine) Elina Svitolina	(United States) Grace Min (WC)
(Australia) Ashleigh Barty (Q)	(Kazakhstan) Yaroslava Shvedova	(United Kingdom) Heather Watson	(Belarus) Olga Govortsova
(Russia) Ksenia Pervak (Q)	(China) Duan Yingying (Q)	(Belgium) Yanina Wickmayer	(Canada) Aleksandra Wozniak
(Germany) Annika Beck	(France) Virginie Razzano	(Italy) Karin Knapp	(Serbia) Bojana Jovanovski
(Hungary) Tímea Babos	(Switzerland) Stefanie Vögele	(Switzerland) Romina Oprandi (PR)	(France) Amandine Hesse (WC)
(Argentina) Paula Ormaechea	(Spain) Sílvia Soler Espinosa	(China) Zheng Jie	(Canada) Sharon Fichman
(Russia) Maria Kirilenko	(Czech Republic) Kristýna Plíšková	(Israel) Julia Glushko	(Canada) Françoise Abanda (Q)
(Tunisia) Ons Jabeur (Q)	(Czech Republic) Tereza Smitková	(Slovakia) Anna Karolína Schmiedlová	(Slovakia) Magdaléna Rybáriková
(Belgium) Kirsten Flipkens	(Italy) Camila Giorgi	(Netherlands) Kiki Bertens	(Japan) Kimiko Date-Krumm
(Spain) Garbiñe Muguruza [25]	(United Kingdom) Johanna Konta	(Spain) María Teresa Torró Flor	(United States) Danielle Collins (WC)

== Events ==
=== Seniors ===
==== Men's singles ====
- (Croatia) Marin Čilić defeated (Japan) Kei Nishikori, 6–3, 6–3, 6–3

• It was Čilić's 1st career Grand Slam singles title. He was the first Croatian tennis player to win the US Open.
• Nishikori became the first Japanese tennis player (male or female) to reach the Grand Slam final. He was also the first Asian man to reach the Grand Slam final.

==== Women's singles ====
- (United States) Serena Williams defeated (Denmark) Caroline Wozniacki 6–3, 6–3

• It was Williams' 18th career Grand Slam singles title and her 6th at the US Open. It was her 6th career title of the year.

==== Men's doubles ====
- (United States) Bob Bryan / (United States) Mike Bryan defeated (Spain) Marcel Granollers / (Spain) Marc López 6–4, 6–3

• It was Bob and Mike's 16th career Grand Slam doubles title and their 5th at the US Open.

==== Women's doubles ====
- (Russia) Ekaterina Makarova / (Russia) Elena Vesnina defeated (Switzerland) Martina Hingis / (Italy) Flavia Pennetta, 2–6, 6–3, 6–2

• It was Makarova and Vesnina's 2nd career Grand Slam doubles titles and their 1st at the US Open.

==== Mixed doubles ====
- (India) Sania Mirza / (Brazil) Bruno Soares defeated (United States) Abigail Spears / (Mexico) Santiago González, 6–1, 2–6, [11–9]

• It was Mirza's 3rd career Grand Slam mixed doubles title and her 1st at the US Open.
• It was Soares' 2nd career Grand Slam mixed doubles title and his 2nd at the US Open.

=== Juniors ===
==== Boys' singles ====
- (Australia) Omar Jasika defeated (France) Quentin Halys, 2–6, 7–5, 6–1

==== Girls' singles ====
- (Czech Republic) Marie Bouzková defeated (Ukraine) Anhelina Kalinina, 6–4, 7–6^{(7–5)}

==== Boys' doubles ====
- (Australia) Omar Jasika / (Japan) Naoki Nakagawa defeated (Brazil) Rafael Matos / (Brazil) João Menezes, 6–3, 7–6^{(8–6)}

==== Girls' doubles ====
- (Turkey) İpek Soylu / (Switzerland) Jil Teichmann defeated (Belarus) Vera Lapko / (Slovakia) Tereza Mihalíková, 5–7, 6–2, [10–7]

=== Wheelchair ===
==== Wheelchair men's singles ====
- (Japan) Shingo Kunieda defeated (Argentina) Gustavo Fernández, 7-6^{(7–0)}, 6–4

==== Wheelchair women's singles ====
- (Japan) Yui Kamiji defeated (Netherlands) Aniek van Koot, 6–3, 6–3

==== Wheelchair quad singles ====
- (United Kingdom) Andrew Lapthorne defeated (United States) David Wagner, 7–5, 6–2

==== Wheelchair men's doubles ====
- (France) Stéphane Houdet / (Japan) Shingo Kunieda defeated (United Kingdom) Gordon Reid / (Netherlands) Maikel Scheffers, 6–2, 2–6, 7–6^{(7–4)}

==== Wheelchair women's doubles ====
- (Japan) Yui Kamiji / (United Kingdom) Jordanne Whiley defeated (Netherlands) Jiske Griffioen / (Netherlands) Aniek van Koot, 6–4, 3–6, 6–3

==== Wheelchair quad doubles ====
- (United States) Nick Taylor / (United States) David Wagner defeated (United Kingdom) Andrew Lapthorne / (South Africa) Lucas Sithole, 6–3, 7–5

== Singles seeds ==
Seedings are based on rankings as of August 18, 2014. Rankings and points before are as of August 25, 2014.

=== Men's singles ===
Seed	Rank	Player	Points before	Points defending	Points won	Points after	Status
1	1	(Serbia) Novak Djokovic	12,770	1,200	720	12,290	Semifinals lost to (Japan) Kei Nishikori [10]
2	3	(Switzerland) Roger Federer	7,490	180	720	8,030	Semifinals lost to (Croatia) Marin Čilić [14]
3	4	(Switzerland) Stan Wawrinka	5,985	720	360	5,625	Quarterfinals lost to (Japan) Kei Nishikori [10]
4	5	(Spain) David Ferrer	4,765	360	90	4,495	Third round lost to (France) Gilles Simon [26]
5	6	(Canada) Milos Raonic	4,225	180	180	4,225	Fourth round lost to (Japan) Kei Nishikori [10]
6	7	(Czech Republic) Tomáš Berdych	4,060	180	360	4,240	Quarterfinals lost to (Croatia) Marin Čilić [14]
7	8	(Bulgaria) Grigor Dimitrov	3,540	10	180	3,710	Fourth round lost to (France) Gaël Monfils [20]
8	9	(United Kingdom) Andy Murray	3,150	360	360	3,150	Quarterfinals lost to (Serbia) Novak Djokovic [1]
9	10	(France) Jo-Wilfried Tsonga	2,920	0	180	3,100	Fourth round lost to (United Kingdom) Andy Murray [8]
10	11	(Japan) Kei Nishikori	2,680	10	1,200	3,870	Runner-up, lost to (Croatia) Marin Čilić [14]
11	12	(Latvia) Ernests Gulbis	2,580	10	45	2,615	Second round lost to (Austria) Dominic Thiem
12	14	(France) Richard Gasquet	2,360	720	90	1,730	Third round lost to (France) Gaël Monfils [20]
13	15	(United States) John Isner	1,925	90	90	1,925	Third round lost to (Germany) Philipp Kohlschreiber [22]
14	16	(Croatia) Marin Čilić	1,845	0	2,000	3,845	Champion, defeated (Japan) Kei Nishikori [10]
15	17	(Italy) Fabio Fognini	1,835	10	45	1,870	Second round lost to (France) Adrian Mannarino
16	18	(Spain) Tommy Robredo	1,825	360	180	1,645	Fourth round lost to (Switzerland) Stan Wawrinka [3]
17	19	(Spain) Roberto Bautista Agut	1,800	45	180	1,935	Fourth round lost to (Switzerland) Roger Federer [2]
18	20	(South Africa) Kevin Anderson	1,795	45	90	1,840	Third round lost to (Croatia) Marin Čilić [14]
19	21	(Spain) Feliciano López	1,770	90	90	1,770	Third round lost to (Austria) Dominic Thiem
20	24	(France) Gaël Monfils	1,530	45	360	1,845	Quarterfinals lost to (Switzerland) Roger Federer [2]
21	23	(Russia) Mikhail Youzhny	1,540	360	10	1,190	First round lost to (Australia) Nick Kyrgios
22	25	(Germany) Philipp Kohlschreiber	1,505	180	180	1,505	Fourth round lost to (Serbia) Novak Djokovic [1]
23	26	(Argentina) Leonardo Mayer	1,354	45	90	1,399	Third round lost to (Japan) Kei Nishikori [10]
24	28	(France) Julien Benneteau	1,285	90	10	1,205	First round lost to (France) Benoît Paire
25	30	(Croatia) Ivo Karlović	1,220	70	45	1,195	Second round lost to (Spain) Marcel Granollers
26	31	(France) Gilles Simon	1,180	0	180	1,360	Fourth round lost to (Croatia) Marin Čilić [14]
27	32	(Colombia) Santiago Giraldo	1,180	10	10	1,180	First round lost to (Russia) Teymuraz Gabashvili
28	33	(Spain) Guillermo García López	1,168	10	45	1,203	Second round lost to (United States) Sam Querrey
29	27	(Czech Republic) Lukáš Rosol	1,290	10	10	1,290	First round lost to (Croatia) Borna Ćorić [Q]
30	36	(France) Jérémy Chardy	1,105	45	45	1,105	Second round lost to (Slovenia) Blaž Kavčič
31	37	(Spain) Fernando Verdasco	1,100	10	45	1,135	Second round lost to (Russia) Andrey Kuznetsov
32	38	(Portugal) João Sousa	1,077	90	45	1,032	Second round lost to (Belgium) David Goffin

==== Withdrawn players ====
Rank	Player	Points before	Points defending	Points won	Withdrawal reason
2	(Spain) Rafael Nadal	10,670	2,000	8,670	Wrist injury
13	(Argentina) Juan Martín del Potro	2,410	45	2,365	Wrist injury
22	(Ukraine) Alexandr Dolgopolov	1,580	45	1,535	Knee injury
29	(Spain) Nicolás Almagro	1,250	10	1,240	Foot injury
35	(Germany) Tommy Haas	1,115	90	1,025	Shoulder injury

=== Women's singles ===
Seed	Rank	Player	Points before	Points defending	Points won	Points after	Status
1	1	(United States) Serena Williams	9,430	2,000	2,000	9,430	Champion, defeated (Denmark) Caroline Wozniacki [10]
2	2	(Romania) Simona Halep	6,310	280	130	6,160	Third round lost to (Croatia) Mirjana Lučić-Baroni [Q]
3	4	(Czech Republic) Petra Kvitová	5,956	160	130	5,926	Third round lost to (Serbia) Aleksandra Krunić [Q]
4	5	(Poland) Agnieszka Radwańska	5,590	280	70	5,380	Second round lost to (China) Peng Shuai
5	6	(Russia) Maria Sharapova	5,335	0	240	5,575	Fourth round lost to (Denmark) Caroline Wozniacki [10]
6	7	(Germany) Angelique Kerber	4,550	280	130	4,400	Third round lost to (Switzerland) Belinda Bencic
7	8	(Canada) Eugenie Bouchard	4,405	100	240	4,545	Fourth round lost to (Russia) Ekaterina Makarova [17]
8	9	(Serbia) Ana Ivanovic	4,065	280	70	3,855	Second round lost to (Czech Republic) Karolína Plíšková
9	10	(Serbia) Jelena Janković	3,695	280	240	3,655	Fourth round lost to (Switzerland) Belinda Bencic
10	11	(Denmark) Caroline Wozniacki	3,165	160	1,300	4,305	Runner-up, lost to (United States) Serena Williams [1]
11	12	(Italy) Flavia Pennetta	3,121	900	430	2,651	Quarterfinals lost to (United States) Serena Williams [1]
12	13	(Slovakia) Dominika Cibulková	3,002	5	10	3,007	First round lost to (United States) Catherine Bellis [WC]
13	14	(Italy) Sara Errani	2,885	100	430	3,215	Quarterfinals lost to (Denmark) Caroline Wozniacki [10]
14	15	(Czech Republic) Lucie Šafářová	2,825	100	240	2,965	Fourth round lost to (China) Peng Shuai
15	16	(Spain) Carla Suárez Navarro	2,790	500	130	2,420	Third round lost to (Estonia) Kaia Kanepi
16	17	(Belarus) Victoria Azarenka	2,783	1,400	430	1,813	Quarterfinals lost to (Russia) Ekaterina Makarova [17]
17	18	(Russia) Ekaterina Makarova	2,565	500	780	2,845	Semifinals lost to (United States) Serena Williams [1]
18	19	(Germany) Andrea Petkovic	2,400	5	130	2,525	Third round lost to (Denmark) Caroline Wozniacki [10]
19	20	(United States) Venus Williams	2,340	100	130	2,370	Third round lost to (Italy) Sara Errani [13]
20	22	(Russia) Svetlana Kuznetsova	2,010	160	10	1,860	First round lost to (New Zealand) Marina Erakovic
21	24	(United States) Sloane Stephens	1,900	280	70	1,690	Second round lost to (Sweden) Johanna Larsson
22	23	(France) Alizé Cornet	1,930	160	130	1,900	Third round lost to (Czech Republic) Lucie Šafářová [14]
23	25	(Russia) Anastasia Pavlyuchenkova	1,865	160	70	1,775	Second round lost to (United States) Nicole Gibbs [WC]
24	21	(Australia) Samantha Stosur	2,045	5	70	2,110	Second round lost to (Estonia) Kaia Kanepi
25	26	(Spain) Garbiñe Muguruza	1,793	0	10	1,803	First round lost to (Croatia) Mirjana Lučić-Baroni [Q]
26	27	(Germany) Sabine Lisicki	1,576	160	130	1,546	Third round lost to (Russia) Maria Sharapova [5]
27	28	(United States) Madison Keys	1,605	5	70	1,670	Second round lost to (Serbia) Aleksandra Krunić [Q]
28	30	(Italy) Roberta Vinci	1,492	500	130	1,122	Third round lost to (China) Peng Shuai
29	32	(Australia) Casey Dellacqua	1,441	60	240	1,621	Fourth round lost to (Italy) Flavia Pennetta [11]
30	29	(Czech Republic) Barbora Záhlavová-Strýcová	1,501	(30)^{†}	130	1,601	Third round lost to (Canada) Eugenie Bouchard [7]
31	33	(Japan) Kurumi Nara	1,412	220	70	1,262	Second round lost to (Switzerland) Belinda Bencic
32	34	(China) Zhang Shuai	1,412	(60)^{†}	10	1,362	First round lost to (Germany) Mona Barthel

†The player did not qualify for the tournament in 2013. Accordingly, this was the 16th best result deducted instead.

==== Withdrawn players ====
Rank	Player	Points before	Points defending	Points won	Withdrawal reason
3	(China) Li Na	6,170	900	5,270	Knee injury

== Doubles seeds ==
=== Men's doubles ===
Team		Rank^{1}	Seed
(United States) Bob Bryan	(United States) Mike Bryan	2	1
(Austria) Alexander Peya	(Brazil) Bruno Soares	6	2
(Canada) Daniel Nestor	(Serbia) Nenad Zimonjić	11	3
(Croatia) Ivan Dodig	(Brazil) Marcelo Melo	14	4
(France) Julien Benneteau	(France) Édouard Roger-Vasselin	19	5
(India) Leander Paes	(Czech Republic) Radek Štěpánek	23	6
(Spain) David Marrero	(Spain) Fernando Verdasco	27	7
(Canada) Vasek Pospisil	(United States) Jack Sock	36	8
(Netherlands) Jean-Julien Rojer	(Romania) Horia Tecău	39	9
(France) Michaël Llodra	(France) Nicolas Mahut	40	10
(Spain) Marcel Granollers	(Spain) Marc López	42	11
(United States) Eric Butorac	(South Africa) Raven Klaasen	49	12
(India) Rohan Bopanna	(Pakistan) Aisam-ul-Haq Qureshi	56	13
(Philippines) Treat Huey	(United Kingdom) Dominic Inglot	63	14
(United Kingdom) Jamie Murray	(Australia) John Peers	63	15
(Colombia) Juan Sebastián Cabal	(Colombia) Robert Farah	64	16

- ^{1} Rankings are as of August 18, 2014.

=== Women's doubles ===
Team		Rank^{1}	Seed
(Italy) Sara Errani	(Italy) Roberta Vinci	2	1
(Chinese Taipei) Hsieh Su-wei	(China) Peng Shuai	7	2
(Zimbabwe) Cara Black	(India) Sania Mirza	11	3
(Russia) Ekaterina Makarova	(Russia) Elena Vesnina	17	4
(Czech Republic) Květa Peschke	(Slovenia) Katarina Srebotnik	18	5
(United States) Raquel Kops-Jones	(United States) Abigail Spears	28	6
(Hungary) Tímea Babos	(France) Kristina Mladenovic	29	7
(Czech Republic) Andrea Hlaváčková	(China) Zheng Jie	32	8
(Russia) Alla Kudryavtseva	(Australia) Anastasia Rodionova	36	9
(Australia) Ashleigh Barty	(Australia) Casey Dellacqua	37	10
(Czech Republic) Lucie Hradecká	(Netherlands) Michaëlla Krajicek	42	11
(Spain) Garbiñe Muguruza	(Spain) Carla Suárez Navarro	47	12
(Spain) Anabel Medina Garrigues	(Kazakhstan) Yaroslava Shvedova	49	13
(Chinese Taipei) Chan Hao-ching	(Chinese Taipei) Chan Yung-jan	55	15
(Russia) Anastasia Pavlyuchenkova	(Czech Republic) Lucie Šafářová	62	15
(Germany) Julia Görges	(Germany) Anna-Lena Grönefeld	64	16

- ^{1} Rankings are as of August 18, 2014.

=== Mixed doubles ===
Team		Rank^{1}	Seed
(India) Sania Mirza	(Brazil) Bruno Soares	8	1
(Czech Republic) Andrea Hlaváčková	(Austria) Alexander Peya	13	2
(Zimbabwe) Cara Black	(India) Leander Paes	17	3
(France) Kristina Mladenovic	(Canada) Daniel Nestor	18	4
(Czech Republic) Lucie Hradecká	(Romania) Horia Tecău	32	5
(Slovenia) Katarina Srebotnik	(India) Rohan Bopanna	35	6
(Germany) Julia Görges	(Serbia) Nenad Zimonjić	42	7
(United States) Raquel Kops-Jones	(Colombia) Juan Sebastián Cabal	42	8

- ^{1} Rankings are as of August 18, 2014.

== Wild card entries ==
Men's Singles

- (United States) Jared Donaldson
- (United States) Marcos Giron
- (United States) Ryan Harrison
- (France) Michaël Llodra
- (United States) Wayne Odesnik
- (United States) Noah Rubin
- (United States) Tim Smyczek
- (Australia) Bernard Tomic

Source: USTA – Men's Singles Wild Cards

Women's Singles

- (United States) Catherine Bellis
- (United States) Madison Brengle
- (United States) Danielle Collins
- (Australia) Jarmila Gajdošová
- (United States) Nicole Gibbs
- (France) Amandine Hesse
- (United States) Grace Min
- (United States) Taylor Townsend

Source: USTA – Women's Singles Wild Cards

Men's Doubles

- (United States) Chase Buchanan / (United States) Tennys Sandgren
- (United States) Jared Donaldson / (United States) Michael Russell
- (United States) Marcos Giron / (United States) Kevin King
- (United States) Bradley Klahn / (United States) Tim Smyczek
- (United States) Peter Kobelt / (United States) Hunter Reese
- (United States) Stefan Kozlov / (United States) Noah Rubin
- (United States) Michael Mmoh / (United States) Francis Tiafoe

Source: USTA – Men's Doubles Wild Cards

Women's Doubles

- (United States) Tornado Alicia Black / (United States) Bernarda Pera
- (United States) Jennifer Brady / (United States) Samantha Crawford
- (United States) Louisa Chirico / (United States) Katerina Stewart
- (United States) Irina Falconi / (United States) Anna Tatishvili
- (United States) Nicole Gibbs / (United States) Maria Sanchez
- (United States) Grace Min / (United States) Melanie Oudin
- (United States) Asia Muhammad / (United States) Taylor Townsend

Source: USTA – Women's Doubles Wild Cards

Mixed Doubles

- (United States) Tornado Alicia Black / (United States) Ernesto Escobedo
- (United States) Jacqueline Cako / (United States) Joel Kielbowicz
- (United States) Lauren Davis / (United States) Nicholas Monroe
- (United States) Christina McHale / (United States) Stefan Kozlov
- (United States) Asia Muhammad / (United States) Taylor Harry Fritz
- (United States) Melanie Oudin / (United States) Rajeev Ram
- (United States) Shelby Rogers / (United States) Bradley Klahn
- (United States) Taylor Townsend / (United States) Donald Young

Source: USTA – Mixed Doubles Wild Cards

== Qualifiers entries ==
=== Men's singles ===
1. (Switzerland) Marco Chiudinelli
2. (Belgium) Niels Desein
3. (Serbia) Filip Krajinović
4. (Argentina) Facundo Bagnis
5. (Japan) Yoshihito Nishioka
6. (Ukraine) Illya Marchenko
7. (Germany) Andreas Beck
8. (Russia) Alexander Kudryavtsev
9. (Germany) Peter Gojowczyk
10. (Japan) Taro Daniel
11. (Japan) Tatsuma Ito
12. (Germany) Matthias Bachinger
13. (Republic of Ireland) James McGee
14. (Belgium) Steve Darcis
15. (Moldova) Radu Albot
16. (Croatia) Borna Ćorić

=== Women's singles ===
1. (China) Wang Qiang
2. (Ukraine) Maryna Zanevska
3. (Ukraine) Lesia Tsurenko
4. (Russia) Alla Kudryavtseva
5. (Australia) Ashleigh Barty
6. (Russia) Ksenia Pervak
7. (Canada) Françoise Abanda
8. (China) Duan Yingying
9. (Tunisia) Ons Jabeur
10. (Serbia) Aleksandra Krunić
11. (Chinese Taipei) Chan Yung-jan
12. (Australia) Anastasia Rodionova
13. (Croatia) Mirjana Lučić-Baroni
14. (Poland) Paula Kania
15. (China) Zheng Saisai
16. (Belarus) Aliaksandra Sasnovich

== Protected ranking ==
The following players were accepted directly into the main draw using a protected ranking:

Women's Singles

- (Switzerland) Romina Oprandi (PR 40)

== Withdrawals ==
The following players were accepted directly into the main tournament, but withdrew with injuries.

Before the tournament

Men's Singles

- (Spain) Nicolás Almagro → replaced by (Bosnia and Herzegovina) Damir Džumhur
- (Argentina) Juan Martín del Potro → replaced by (Argentina) Máximo González
- (Ukraine) Alexandr Dolgopolov → replaced by (Spain) Albert Montañés
- (Germany) Tommy Haas → replaced by (Cyprus) Marcos Baghdatis
- (Germany) Florian Mayer → replaced by (Italy) Simone Bolelli
- (Spain) Rafael Nadal → replaced by (France) Kenny de Schepper
- (France) Stéphane Robert → replaced by (Russia) Evgeny Donskoy

Women's Singles

- (United States) Victoria Duval → replaced by (France) Virginie Razzano
- (Russia) Alisa Kleybanova → replaced by (United States) Shelby Rogers
- (China) Li Na → replaced by (Canada) Aleksandra Wozniak

== See also ==
- US Open (tennis)

Preceded by 2014 Wimbledon Championships	Grand Slams	Succeeded by 2015 Australian Open
Preceded by 2013 US Open	US Open	Succeeded by 2015 US Open
