= 2014 US Open Series =

In tennis, the 2014 US Open Series (known as Emirates Airline US Open Series for sponsorship reasons) was the eleventh edition of the US Open Series, which included nine hard court tournaments that started on July 21, 2014, in Atlanta and concluded in Winston-Salem for the men and in New Haven for the women on August 23, 2014. This edition consisted of four separate men's tournaments and three women's tournaments, with the Western & Southern Open hosting both a men's and women's event. The series was headlined by two ATP World Tour Masters 1000 and two WTA Premier 5 events. Milos Raonic and Serena Williams were the US Open Series champions in 2014. Serena Williams improved the biggest payout in professional tennis history record which she previously shared with Rafael Nadal. The new record was then set at $4 million.

== Point distribution for series events ==
In order to be included in the final standings and subsequently the bonus prize money, a player needs to have countable results from at least two different tournaments. Starting from the 2014 season, a new rule has been added to double the points of a player who has obtained countable results in at least three tournaments.

The players who finish in the top three in the series can earn up to $1 million in extra prize money at the US Open.

Round	ATP World Tour 1000 WTA Premier 5	ATP World Tour 500 & 250 WTA Premier
Winner	100	70
Finalist	70	45
Semifinalist	45	25
Quarterfinalist	25	15
Round of 16	15	0

== US Open Series standings ==
The standings include all players who received points in at least two tournaments.

=== ATP ===
Rank	Nation	Player	Tours ^{1}	Titles	Points
1	CAN	Milos Raonic	3	1	280^{2}
2	USA	John Isner	3	1	200^{2}
3	SUI	Roger Federer	2	1	170
4	ESP	David Ferrer	2		95
5	FRA	Julien Benneteau	2		60
5	POL	Jerzy Janowicz	2		60
5	CAN	Vasek Pospisil	2		60
8	GBR	Andy Murray	2		50
9	RSA	Kevin Anderson	2		40
9	FRA	Richard Gasquet	2		40
9	TPE	Lu Yen-hsun	2		40
9	ESP	Tommy Robredo	2		40
9	SUI	Stan Wawrinka	2		40
14	CRO	Marin Čilić	2		30
14	SRB	Novak Djokovic	2		30
14	USA	Steve Johnson	2		30

Notes:

- 1 – Tours – Number of tournaments in US Open Series in which a player has reached the quarterfinals or better, in 250 and 500 series events, or the Round of 16 in ATP World Tour Masters 1000 events.
- 2 – Indicates a player has earned points in at least three Emirates Airline US Open Series events, therefore doubling his point total earned on the Series.

=== WTA ===
Rank	Nation	Player	Tours ^{1}	Titles	Points
1	USA	Serena Williams	3	2 (1st, 2nd)	430^{2}
2	GER	Angelique Kerber	3		150^{2}
3	POL	Agnieszka Radwańska	2	1	125
4	SRB	Ana Ivanovic	2		85
4	CZE	Petra Kvitová	2	1	85
4	USA	Venus Williams	2		85
7	DEN	Caroline Wozniacki	2		70
8	RUS	Maria Sharapova	2		60
9	SRB	Jelena Janković	2		40
9	ESP	Carla Suárez Navarro	2		40
11	GER	Sabine Lisicki	2		30
11	CZE	Lucie Šafářová	2		30

Notes:

- 1 – Tours – Number of tournaments in US Open Series in which a player has reached the quarterfinals or better, in Premier events; or the Round of 16 or better in Premier 5 events.
- 2 – Indicates a player has earned points in at least three Emirates Airline US Open Series events, therefore doubling her point total earned on the Series.

== Bonus Prize Money ==
Top three players in the 2014 US Open Series will receive bonus prize money, depending on where they finish in the 2014 US Open, according to money schedule below.

2014 Emirates Airline US Open Series Finish	2014 US Open Finish								Awardees	
2014 Emirates Airline US Open Series Finish	W	F	SF	QF	Round of 16	Round of 32	Round of 64	Round of 128	Awardees	
1st Place	$1,000,000	$500,000	$250,000	$125,000	$70,000	$40,000	$25,000	$15,000	(Canada) Milos Raonic	$70,000
1st Place	$1,000,000	$500,000	$250,000	$125,000	$70,000	$40,000	$25,000	$15,000	(United States) Serena Williams	$1,000,000
2nd Place	$500,000	$250,000	$125,000	$62,500	$35,000	$20,000	$12,500	$7,500	(United States) John Isner	$20,000
2nd Place	$500,000	$250,000	$125,000	$62,500	$35,000	$20,000	$12,500	$7,500	(Germany) Angelique Kerber	$20,000
3rd Place	$250,000	$125,000	$62,500	$31,250	$17,500	$10,000	$6,250	$3,750	(Switzerland) Roger Federer	$62,500
3rd Place	$250,000	$125,000	$62,500	$31,250	$17,500	$10,000	$6,250	$3,750	(Poland) Agnieszka Radwańska	$6,250

== 2014 Schedule ==
Legend
Grand Slam Event
ATP Masters 1000 and WTA Premier 5
ATP World Tour 500 and WTA Premier
ATP World Tour 250 and WTA International

Week	Date	Men's Events	Women's Events
1	July 21 – July 27	Atlanta; BB&T Atlanta Open; 2014 Champion: (United States) John Isner	No Series Event Held This Week
2	July 28 – August 3	Washington, D.C. Citi Open; 2014 Champion: (Canada) Milos Raonic	Stanford; Bank of the West Classic; 2014 Champion: (United States) Serena Williams
3	August 4 – August 10	Toronto; Rogers Cup presented by National Bank; 2014 Champion: (France) Jo-Wilfried Tsonga	Montreal; Rogers Cup presented by National Bank; 2014 Champion: (Poland) Agnieszka Radwańska
4	August 10 – August 17	Cincinnati; Western & Southern Open; 2014 Champion: (Switzerland) Roger Federer	Cincinnati; Western & Southern Open; 2014 Champion: (United States) Serena Williams
5	August 17 – August 23	Winston-Salem; Winston-Salem Open; 2014 Champion: (Czech Republic) Lukáš Rosol	Connecticut; Connecticut Open; 2014 Champion: (Czech Republic) Petra Kvitová
6–7	August 25 – September 8	New York; US Open; 2014 Champion: (Croatia) Marin Čilić	New York; US Open; 2014 Champion: (United States) Serena Williams

== Week 1 ==
=== ATP – BB&T Atlanta Open ===
==== Main draw finals ====
Quarterfinals
1	(United States) J Isner	7^{10}	6
8	(Australia) M Matosevic	6^{8}	4
(United States) J Sock	7^{8}	6
(Slovakia) L Lacko	6^{6}	2
(Israel) D Sela	7	1	6
4	(Canada) V Pospisil	5	6	2
(Germany) B Becker	6	6
LL	(Netherlands) T de Bakker	4	2

Semifinals
1	(United States) John Isner	7	6
(United States) Jack Sock	5	4
(Israel) Dudi Sela	6	3	6
(Germany) Benjamin Becker	3	6	3

Final
1	(United States) John Isner	6	6
(Israel) Dudi Sela	3	4

== Week 2 ==
=== ATP – Citi Open ===
==== Main draw finals ====
Quarterfinals
13	(Canada) Vasek Pospisil	6^{4}	6	6
10	(Colombia) Santiago Giraldo	7^{7}	3	4
4	(Japan) Kei Nishikori	1	4
6	(France) Richard Gasquet	6	6
7	(South Africa) Kevin Anderson	6	6^{3}	2
(United States) Donald Young	3	7^{7}	6
(United States) Steve Johnson	6^{2}	2
2	(Canada) Milos Raonic	7^{7}	6

Semifinals
13	(Canada) Vasek Pospisil	6^{5}	6	7
6	(France) Richard Gasquet	7^{7}	3	5
(United States) Donald Young	4	5
2	(Canada) Milos Raonic	6	7

Final
13	(Canada) Vasek Pospisil	1	4
2	(Canada) Milos Raonic	6	6

=== WTA – Bank of West Classic ===
==== Main draw finals ====
Quarterfinals
1	(United States) Serena Williams	2	6	7
5	(Serbia) Ana Ivanovic	6	3	5
WC	(United States) Venus Williams	1	6	5
8	(Germany) Andrea Petkovic	6	3	7
(Spain) Garbiñe Muguruza	2	1
3	(Germany) Angelique Kerber	6	6
Q	(United States) Sachia Vickery	1	0
(United States) Varvara Lepchenko	6	6

Semifinals
1	(United States) Serena Williams	7	6
8	(Germany) Andrea Petkovic	5	0
3	(Germany) Angelique Kerber	4	7^{7}	6
(United States) Varvara Lepchenko	6	6^{4}	2

Final
1	(United States) Serena Williams	7^{7}	6
3	(Germany) Angelique Kerber	6^{1}	3

== Week 3 ==
=== ATP – Rogers Cup (Toronto) ===
==== Main draw finals ====
Third Round
1	(Serbia) Novak Djokovic	2	2
13	(France) Jo-Wilfried Tsonga	6	6
12	(France) Richard Gasquet
8	(United Kingdom) Andy Murray	w/o
3	(Switzerland) Stan Wawrinka	6^{8}	5
(South Africa) Kevin Anderson	7^{10}	7
17	(Spain) Tommy Robredo	5	7	4
7	(Bulgaria) Grigor Dimitrov	7	5	6
6	(Canada) Milos Raonic	6	4	6
(France) Julien Benneteau	3	6	4
(Spain) Feliciano López	3	6	6
4	(Czech Republic) Tomáš Berdych	6	3	4
5	(Spain) David Ferrer	1	6	6
(Croatia) Ivan Dodig	6	3	3
15	(Croatia) Marin Čilić	6^{5}	7^{7}	4
2	(Switzerland) Roger Federer	7^{7}	6^{3}	6

Quarterfinals
13	(France) Jo-Wilfried Tsonga	7^{7}	4	6
8	(United Kingdom) Andy Murray	6^{5}	6	4
(South Africa) Kevin Anderson	7	5	6^{6}
7	(Bulgaria) Grigor Dimitrov	5	7	7^{8}
6	(Canada) Milos Raonic	4	7^{7}	3
(Spain) Feliciano López	6	6^{5}	6
5	(Spain) David Ferrer	3	6	3
2	(Switzerland) Roger Federer	6	4	6

Semifinals
13	(France) Jo-Wilfried Tsonga	6	6
7	(Bulgaria) Grigor Dimitrov	4	3
(Spain) Feliciano López	3	4
2	(Switzerland) Roger Federer	6	6

Final
13	(France) Jo-Wilfried Tsonga	7	7^{7}
2	(Switzerland) Roger Federer	5	6^{3}

=== WTA – Rogers Cup (Montreal) ===
==== Main draw finals ====
Third Round
1	(United States) Serena Williams	7	6
15	(Czech Republic) Lucie Šafářová	5	4
11	(Denmark) Caroline Wozniacki	6	6
Q	(United States) Shelby Rogers	1	0
4	(Russia) Maria Sharapova	2	6	2
14	(Spain) Carla Suárez Navarro	6	4	6
(United States) Venus Williams	6	3	6
6	(Germany) Angelique Kerber	3	6	4
8	(Belarus) Victoria Azarenka	6	6
Q	(United Kingdom) Heather Watson	2	4
(Germany) Sabine Lisicki	1	6	3
3	(Poland) Agnieszka Radwańska	6	3	6
7	(Serbia) Jelena Janković	6	6	5
Q	(United States) Coco Vandeweghe	7	2	7
(Russia) Ekaterina Makarova	6	1	6
2	(Czech Republic) Petra Kvitová	4	6	2

Quarterfinals
1	(United States) Serena Williams	4	7	7
11	(Denmark) Caroline Wozniacki	6	5	5
14	(Spain) Carla Suárez Navarro	6	2	3
(United States) Venus Williams	4	6	6
8	(Belarus) Victoria Azarenka	2	2
3	(Poland) Agnieszka Radwańska	6	6
Q	(United States) Coco Vandeweghe	1	6	1
(Russia) Ekaterina Makarova	6	4	6

Semifinals
1	(United States) Serena Williams	7^{7}	2	3
(United States) Venus Williams	6^{2}	6	6
3	(Poland) Agnieszka Radwańska	7^{7}	7^{7}
(Russia) Ekaterina Makarova	6^{1}	6^{3}

Final
(United States) Venus Williams	4	2
3	(Poland) Agnieszka Radwańska	6	6

== Week 4 ==
=== ATP – Western & Southern Open ===
==== Main draw finals ====
Third Round
1	(Serbia) Novak Djokovic	6^{6}	5
16	(Spain) Tommy Robredo	7^{8}	7
(Russia) Mikhail Youzhny	5	0
6	(Spain) David Ferrer	7	6
3	(Switzerland) Stan Wawrinka	3	6	6
14	(Croatia) Marin Čilić	6	0	1
(France) Julien Benneteau	7	6
(Poland) Jerzy Janowicz	5	1
5	(Canada) Milos Raonic	6^{7}	6	7^{7}
WC	(United States) Steve Johnson	7^{9}	3	6^{4}
15	(Italy) Fabio Fognini	3	6	6
(Chinese Taipei) Lu Yen-hsun	6	3	3
8	(United Kingdom) Andy Murray	6^{3}	6	7^{7}
11	(United States) John Isner	7^{7}	4	6^{2}
(France) Gaël Monfils	4	6	3
2	(Switzerland) Roger Federer	6	4	6

Quarterfinals
16	(Spain) Tommy Robredo	4	6	3
6	(Spain) David Ferrer	6	3	6
3	(Switzerland) Stan Wawrinka	6	1	2
(France) Julien Benneteau	1	6	6
5	(Canada) Milos Raonic	6	6
15	(Italy) Fabio Fognini	1	0
8	(United Kingdom) Andy Murray	3	5
2	(Switzerland) Roger Federer	6	7

Semifinals
6	(Spain) David Ferrer	6	6
(France) Julien Benneteau	3	2
5	(Canada) Milos Raonic	2	3
2	(Switzerland) Roger Federer	6	6

Final
6	(Spain) David Ferrer	3	6	2
2	(Switzerland) Roger Federer	6	1	6

=== WTA – Western & Southern Open ===
==== Main draw finals ====
Third Round
1	(United States) Serena Williams	6	6
13	(Italy) Flavia Pennetta	2	2
(United States) Sloane Stephens	6^{4}	4
8	(Serbia) Jelena Janković	7^{7}	6
4	(Poland) Agnieszka Radwańska	6	6
(Germany) Sabine Lisicki	1	1
12	(Denmark) Caroline Wozniacki	7	6
6	(Germany) Angelique Kerber	5	2
(Russia) Svetlana Kuznetsova	2	6	3
9	(Serbia) Ana Ivanovic	6	2	6
15	(Spain) Carla Suárez Navarro	6	4	4
(Ukraine) Elina Svitolina	4	6	6
5	(Russia) Maria Sharapova	6	7^{7}
(Russia) Anastasia Pavlyuchenkova	4	6^{2}
16	(Czech Republic) Lucie Šafářová	4	5
2	(Romania) Simona Halep	6	7

Quarterfinals
1	(United States) Serena Williams	6	6
8	(Serbia) Jelena Janković	1	3
4	(Poland) Agnieszka Radwańska	4	6^{5}
12	(Denmark) Caroline Wozniacki	6	7^{7}
9	(Serbia) Ana Ivanovic	6	6
(Ukraine) Elina Svitolina	2	3
5	(Russia) Maria Sharapova	3	6	6
2	(Romania) Simona Halep	6	4	4

Semifinals
1	(United States) Serena Williams	2	6	6
12	(Denmark) Caroline Wozniacki	6	2	4
9	(Serbia) Ana Ivanovic	6	5	7
5	(Russia) Maria Sharapova	2	7	5

Final
1	(United States) Serena Williams	6	6
9	(Serbia) Ana Ivanovic	4	1

== Week 5 ==
=== ATP – Winston-Salem Open ===
==== Main draw finals ====
Quarterfinals
1	(United States) John Isner
7	(Czech Republic) Lukáš Rosol	w/o
14	(Italy) Andreas Seppi	4	4
9	(Chinese Taipei) Lu Yen-hsun	6	6
(Poland) Jerzy Janowicz	6	6
Q	(Belgium) David Goffin	4	2
5	(Spain) Guillermo García-López	7^{7}	2	4
(United States) Sam Querrey	6^{3}	6	6

Semifinals
7	(Czech Republic) Lukáš Rosol	7	4	6
9	(Chinese Taipei) Lu Yen-hsun	5	6	4
(Poland) Jerzy Janowicz	4	7	6
(United States) Sam Querrey	6	5	4

Final
7	(Czech Republic) Lukáš Rosol	3	7^{7}	7
(Poland) Jerzy Janowicz	6	6^{3}	5

=== WTA – New Haven Open at Yale ===
==== Main draw finals ====
Quarterfinals
(Slovakia) Magdaléna Rybáriková	7	0	6
(United States) Alison Riske	5	6	4
(Italy) Camila Giorgi	6	6^{4}	6
(Spain) Garbiñe Muguruza	4	7^{7}	2
WC	(Belgium) Kirsten Flipkens	3	6	3
WC	(Australia) Samantha Stosur	6	4	6
(Czech Republic) Barbora Záhlavová-Strýcová	4	1
2	(Czech Republic) Petra Kvitová	6	6

Semifinals
(Slovakia) Magdaléna Rybáriková	6	6
(Italy) Camila Giorgi	2	4
WC	(Australia) Samantha Stosur	3	1
2	(Czech Republic) Petra Kvitová	6	6

Final
(Slovakia) Magdaléna Rybáriková	4	2
2	(Czech Republic) Petra Kvitová	6	6
