= Becker O'Shaughnessey =

American tennis player (born 1994)

- Country (sports): United States
- Born: 31 January 1994 (age 32) Macon, United States
- College: University of Alabama
- Prize money: $2,991

Singles
- Career record: 0–0 (at ATP Tour level, Grand Slam level, and in Davis Cup)
- Career titles: 0 ITF
- Highest ranking: No. 1364 (6 January 2014)

Doubles
- Career record: 0–1 (at ATP Tour level, Grand Slam level, and in Davis Cup)
- Career titles: 1 ITF
- Highest ranking: No. 1048 (12 August 2013)
- Last updated on: 27 February 2017.

Becker O'Shaughnessey (born 31 January 1994) is an American tennis player.

O'Shaughnessey has a career high ATP singles ranking of 1364 achieved on 6 January 2014. He also has a career high ATP doubles ranking of 1048 achieved on 12 August 2013.

O'Shaughnessey made his ATP main draw debut at the 2014 BB&T Atlanta Open in the doubles draw partnering Korey Lovett. O'Shaughnessey also played college tennis at the University of Alabama.
