= Korey Lovett =

American tennis player (born 1996)

- Country (sports): United States
- Born: 27 April 1996 (age 30) Brevard, United States
- Plays: Right-handed (two-handed backhand)
- College: University of Central Florida
- Prize money: $13,915

Singles
- Career record: 0–0 (at ATP Tour level, Grand Slam level, and in Davis Cup)
- Career titles: 0
- Highest ranking: No. 1,618 (1 October 2018)

Doubles
- Career record: 0–1 (at ATP Tour level, Grand Slam level, and in Davis Cup)
- Career titles: 0
- Highest ranking: No. 308 (24 February 2020)

Korey Lovett (born 27 April 1996) is an American tennis player.

Lovett has a career high ATP singles ranking of 1,618 achieved on 1 October 2018 and a doubles ranking of No. 308 achieved on 24 February 2020.

Lovett made his ATP main draw debut at the 2014 BB&T Atlanta Open in the doubles draw partnering Becker O'Shaughnessey. Lovett also played college tennis at the University of Central Florida.
