= 2010 US Open – Women's singles qualifying =

Women's singles qualifying
- 2010 US Open

Events
Singles	men	women		boys	girls
Doubles	men	women	mixed	boys	girls
WC Singles	men	women	quad
WC Doubles	men	women	quad
Legends	men	women	mixed

Qualification
Singles	men	women
- US Open

== Seeds ==
1. (Uzbekistan) Akgul Amanmuradova (qualified)
2. (Australia) Jelena Dokić (first round)
3. (Romania) Monica Niculescu (qualified)
4. (China) Zhang Shuai (second round)
5. (United States) Varvara Lepchenko (second round)
6. (Russia) Evgeniya Rodina (qualifying competition)
7. (United States) Shenay Perry (first round)
8. (Czech Republic) Andrea Hlaváčková (first round)
9. (Colombia) Mariana Duque Marino (first round)
10. (Russia) Anastasia Pivovarova (second round)
11. (Austria) Patricia Mayr (qualifying competition)
12. (Slovakia) Zuzana Kučová (qualified)
13. (Czech Republic) Zuzana Ondrášková (qualified)
14. (Paraguay) Rossana de los Ríos (first round)
15. (Germany) Tatjana Malek (first round)
16. (Belarus) Anastasiya Yakimova (second round)
17. (Spain) Nuria Llagostera Vives (qualified)
18. (Netherlands) Arantxa Rus (second round)
19. (United Kingdom) Katie O'Brien (qualifying competition)
20. (France) Olivia Sanchez (first round)
21. (Italy) Maria Elena Camerin (qualified)
22. (Italy) Anna Floris (first round)
23. (Russia) Alexandra Panova (qualifying competition)
24. (Netherlands) Michaëlla Krajicek (first round)
25. (Canada) Stéphanie Dubois (qualifying competition)
26. (Spain) Laura Pous Tió (first round)
27. (Slovenia) Maša Zec Peškirič (first round)
28. (United States) Lilia Osterloh (first round)
29. (Kazakhstan) Sesil Karatantcheva (qualifying competition)
30. (Germany) Anna-Lena Grönefeld (second round)
31. (Russia) Ekaterina Bychkova (first round)
32. (Russia) Nina Bratchikova (first round)

== Qualifiers ==
1. (Uzbekistan) Akgul Amanmuradova
2. (Spain) Nuria Llagostera Vives
3. (Romania) Monica Niculescu
4. (Croatia) Mirjana Lučić
5. (Australia) Sally Peers
6. (Austria) Tamira Paszek
7. (Luxembourg) Mandy Minella
8. (Spain) Lourdes Domínguez Lino
9. (Canada) Rebecca Marino
10. (United States) Irina Falconi
11. (Italy) Maria Elena Camerin
12. (Slovakia) Zuzana Kučová
13. (Czech Republic) Zuzana Ondrášková
14. (Ukraine) Olga Savchuk
15. (India) Sania Mirza
16. (Portugal) Michelle Larcher de Brito

== Qualifying draw ==
Key

- Q = Qualifier
- WC = Wild card
- LL = Lucky loser
- Alt = Alternate
- ITF = ITF entry
- PR = Protected ranking
- SR = Special ranking
- SE = Special exempt
- JE = Junior exempt
- JR = Junior Accelerator Programme entrant
- CO = College Accelerator Programme entrant
- NG = Next Gen Accelerator Program entrant
- w/o = Walkover
- r = Retired
- d = Defaulted

=== First qualifier ===
First round
1	(Uzbekistan) Akgul Amanmuradova	6	6
(Bulgaria) Dia Evtimova	1	4
PR	(Spain) Eva Fernández-Brugués	5	6^{3}
(Japan) Ryōko Fuda	7	7^{7}
(France) Séverine Beltrame	6	6
(France) Nathalie Piquion	1	1
(Canada) Valérie Tétreault	6	7^{7}
26	(Spain) Laura Pous Tió	2	6^{2}

Second round
1	(Uzbekistan) Akgul Amanmuradova	6	6
(Japan) Ryōko Fuda	3	2
(France) Séverine Beltrame	4	5
(Canada) Valérie Tétreault	6	7

Qualifying competition
1	(Uzbekistan) Akgul Amanmuradova	6	6
(Canada) Valérie Tétreault	4	3

=== Second qualifier ===
First round
2	(Australia) Jelena Dokić	1	4
(United Kingdom) Laura Robson	6	6
(Slovakia) Kristína Kučová	2	2
(Russia) Vesna Manasieva	6	6
(Ukraine) Yuliana Fedak	6	7
(France) Mathilde Johansson	4	5
(Russia) Ekaterina Ivanova	4	5
17	(Spain) Nuria Llagostera Vives	6	7

Second round
(United Kingdom) Laura Robson	6	6
(Russia) Vesna Manasieva	3	2
(Ukraine) Yuliana Fedak	6^{6}	5
17	(Spain) Nuria Llagostera Vives	7	7

Qualifying competition
(United Kingdom) Laura Robson	6	4	3
17	(Spain) Nuria Llagostera Vives	2	6	6

=== Third qualifier ===
First round
3	(Romania) Monica Niculescu	6	6
(Austria) Nikola Hofmanova	4	0
(Russia) Vitalia Diatchenko	7^{7}	6
(Greece) Eleni Daniilidou	6^{5}	3
(Japan) Tomoko Yonemura	6^{4}	1
(Russia) Elena Chalova	7^{7}	6
(Argentina) Florencia Molinero	6	4	6
22	(Italy) Anna Floris	4	6	3

Second round
3	(Romania) Monica Niculescu	6	6
(Russia) Vitalia Diatchenko	3	1
(Russia) Elena Chalova	3	0
(Argentina) Florencia Molinero	6	6

Qualifying competition
3	(Romania) Monica Niculescu	6	6
(Argentina) Florencia Molinero	0	4

=== Fourth qualifier ===
First round
4	(China) Zhang Shuai	2	6	6
(Romania) Raluca Olaru	6	2	0
(Belarus) Ekaterina Dzehalevich	5	6	6^{7}
(Croatia) Mirjana Lučić	7	3	7^{9}
(United States) Julia Cohen	6	6
(United Kingdom) Naomi Cavaday	4	4
(Germany) Kathrin Wörle	0	3
29	(Kazakhstan) Sesil Karatantcheva	6	6

Second round
4	(China) Zhang Shuai	6^{3}	1
(Croatia) Mirjana Lučić	7^{7}	6
(United States) Julia Cohen	1	2
29	(Kazakhstan) Sesil Karatantcheva	6	6

Qualifying competition
(Croatia) Mirjana Lučić	6	6
29	(Kazakhstan) Sesil Karatantcheva	1	4

=== Fifth qualifier ===
First round
5	(United States) Varvara Lepchenko	6	6
(France) Claire Feuerstein	2	3
(Japan) Junri Namigata	6^{6}	7	6
(Croatia) Ana Vrljić	7^{8}	5	4
(Australia) Sally Peers	6	6
(Australia) Olivia Rogowska	4	4
(Italy) Corinna Dentoni	6	7
27	(Slovenia) Maša Zec Peškirič	3	5

Second round
5	(United States) Varvara Lepchenko	2	4
(Japan) Junri Namigata	6	6
(Australia) Sally Peers	6	0	6
(Italy) Corinna Dentoni	4	6	3

Qualifying competition
(Japan) Junri Namigata	6^{3}	6	4
(Australia) Sally Peers	7^{7}	4	6

=== Sixth qualifier ===
First round
6	(Russia) Evgeniya Rodina	7^{7}	6
(Poland) Marta Domachowska	6^{3}	2
(Canada) Heidi El Tabakh	6	6
(South Korea) Lee Jin-a	2	4
(South Korea) Kim So-Jung	6	6
(Hungary) Anikó Kapros	0	1
(Austria) Tamira Paszek	6	6
24	(Netherlands) Michaëlla Krajicek	4	3

Second round
6	(Russia) Evgeniya Rodina	6	6
(Canada) Heidi El Tabakh	4	3
(South Korea) Kim So-Jung	3	1
(Austria) Tamira Paszek	6	6

Qualifying competition
6	(Russia) Evgeniya Rodina	6	3	0
(Austria) Tamira Paszek	2	6	6

=== Seventh qualifier ===
First round
7	(United States) Shenay Perry	2	6	0
(Luxembourg) Mandy Minella	6	2	6
(United States) Madison Brengle	6	2	5
(France) Claire de Gubernatis	3	6	7
(Russia) Arina Rodionova	6	6
(Croatia) Ani Mijačika	4	1
(France) Stéphanie Cohen-Aloro	6^{5}	6	6
28	(United States) Lilia Osterloh	7^{7}	4	3

Second round
(Luxembourg) Mandy Minella	6	6
(France) Claire de Gubernatis	3	2
(Russia) Arina Rodionova	6	6
(France) Stéphanie Cohen-Aloro	3	2

Qualifying competition
(Luxembourg) Mandy Minella	7	7^{8}
(Russia) Arina Rodionova	5	6^{6}

=== Eighth qualifier ===
First round
8	(Czech Republic) Andrea Hlaváčková	3	4
WC	(United States) Julia Boserup	6	6
(Spain) Lourdes Domínguez Lino	2	6	6
(United Kingdom) Heather Watson	6	4	3
(United States) Lauren Albanese	2	6^{2}
Alt	(Czech Republic) Kristýna Plíšková	6	7^{7}
(Bolivia) María Fernanda Álvarez Terán	0	0
18	(Netherlands) Arantxa Rus	6	6

Second round
WC	(United States) Julia Boserup	3	2
(Spain) Lourdes Domínguez Lino	6	6
Alt	(Czech Republic) Kristýna Plíšková	6^{5}	7^{7}	6
18	(Netherlands) Arantxa Rus	7^{7}	6^{4}	2

Qualifying competition
(Spain) Lourdes Domínguez Lino	6	3	6
Alt	(Czech Republic) Kristýna Plíšková	3	6	0

=== Ninth qualifier ===
First round
9	(Colombia) Mariana Duque Mariño	3	5
(Canada) Sharon Fichman	6	7
WC	(United States) Nicole Gibbs	6	6
(Greece) Eirini Georgatou	3	2
(Canada) Rebecca Marino	6	6
(Romania) Liana Ungur	3	4
(France) Laura Thorpe	6	6
32	(Russia) Nina Bratchikova	0	2

Second round
(Canada) Sharon Fichman	4	6	6
WC	(United States) Nicole Gibbs	6	4	2
(Canada) Rebecca Marino	6	6
(France) Laura Thorpe	4	4

Qualifying competition
(Canada) Sharon Fichman	2	1
(Canada) Rebecca Marino	6	6

=== Tenth qualifier ===
First round
10	(Russia) Anastasia Pivovarova	7	6
(Belarus) Darya Kustova	5	4
WC	(United States) Irina Falconi	6	6
(Germany) Mona Barthel	0	2
(United States) Lindsay Lee-Waters	1	0
(Spain) Sílvia Soler Espinosa	6	6
(Hong Kong) Zhang Ling	2	0
25	(Canada) Stéphanie Dubois	6	6

Second round
10	(Russia) Anastasia Pivovarova	7	2	2
WC	(United States) Irina Falconi	6^{4}	6	6
(Spain) Sílvia Soler Espinosa	2	7	5
25	(Canada) Stéphanie Dubois	6	5	7

Qualifying competition
WC	(United States) Irina Falconi	6	6
25	(Canada) Stéphanie Dubois	3	1

=== Eleventh qualifier ===
First round
11	(Austria) Patricia Mayr	7	6
(Italy) Camila Giorgi	5	1
WC	(United States) Krista Hardebeck	6	6
(Japan) Yurika Sema	4	4
(Croatia) Ajla Tomljanović	6	6
(Czech Republic) Eva Birnerová	1	4
WC	(United States) Madison Keys	6	4	3
21	(Italy) Maria Elena Camerin	3	6	6

Second round
11	(Austria) Patricia Mayr	6	6
WC	(United States) Krista Hardebeck	4	4
(Croatia) Ajla Tomljanović	2	3
21	(Italy) Maria Elena Camerin	6	6

Qualifying competition
11	(Austria) Patricia Mayr	3	1
21	(Italy) Maria Elena Camerin	6	6

=== Twelfth qualifier ===
First round
12	(Slovakia) Zuzana Kučová	6	4	6
(United States) Alison Riske	3	6	2
(Czech Republic) Petra Cetkovská	7	6
(Turkey) Çağla Büyükakçay	5	4
PR	(Ukraine) Tetiana Luzhanska	6	7
(Georgia (country)) Oksana Kalashnikova	3	5
Alt	(Luxembourg) Anne Kremer	2	6	7^{9}
31	(Russia) Ekaterina Bychkova	6	4	6^{7}

Second round
12	(Slovakia) Zuzana Kučová	7^{7}	6
(Czech Republic) Petra Cetkovská	6^{0}	4
PR	(Ukraine) Tetiana Luzhanska	3	6	7^{7}
Alt	(Luxembourg) Anne Kremer	6	2	6^{2}

Qualifying competition
12	(Slovakia) Zuzana Kučová	6	6
PR	(Ukraine) Tetiana Luzhanska	4	0

=== Thirteenth qualifier ===
First round
13	(Czech Republic) Zuzana Ondrášková	6	6
WC	(United States) Alexandra Mueller	4	1
WC	(United States) Sloane Stephens	6	6
(France) Anaïs Laurendon	4	1
(France) Irena Pavlovic	2	3
(Georgia (country)) Anna Tatishvili	6	6
(Japan) Rika Fujiwara	5	3
30	(Germany) Anna-Lena Grönefeld	7	6

Second round
13	(Czech Republic) Zuzana Ondrášková	6	7
WC	(United States) Sloane Stephens	3	5
(Georgia (country)) Anna Tatishvili	7^{7}	3	7
30	(Germany) Anna-Lena Grönefeld	6^{5}	6	5

Qualifying competition
13	(Czech Republic) Zuzana Ondrášková	7	2	7^{8}
(Georgia (country)) Anna Tatishvili	5	6	6^{6}

=== Fourteenth qualifier ===
First round
14	(Paraguay) Rossana de los Ríos	3	4
(Russia) Valeria Savinykh	6	6
(Ukraine) Olga Savchuk	7^{11}	4	6
WC	(United States) Alexa Glatch	6^{9}	6	3
(Japan) Misaki Doi	6	6
(France) Stéphanie Foretz Gacon	0	0
(Ukraine) Lesia Tsurenko	4	6	2
19	(United Kingdom) Katie O'Brien	6	3	6

Second round
(Russia) Valeria Savinykh	2	3
(Ukraine) Olga Savchuk	6	6
(Japan) Misaki Doi	6^{5}	1
19	(United Kingdom) Katie O'Brien	7^{7}	6

Qualifying competition
(Ukraine) Olga Savchuk	6	3	6
19	(United Kingdom) Katie O'Brien	1	6	1

=== Fifteenth qualifier ===
First round
15	(Germany) Tatjana Malek	7^{7}	2	1
(Russia) Elena Bovina	6^{3}	6	6
(India) Sania Mirza	6	6
(Russia) Ksenia Lykina	2	2
(China) Han Xinyun	6	7
(Germany) Julia Schruff	2	5
(Colombia) Catalina Castaño	6	6
20	(France) Olivia Sanchez	4	4

Second round
(Russia) Elena Bovina	3	3
(India) Sania Mirza	6	6
(China) Han Xinyun	1	2
(Colombia) Catalina Castaño	6	6

Qualifying competition
(India) Sania Mirza	6	1	6
(Colombia) Catalina Castaño	1	6	3

=== Sixteenth qualifier ===
First round
16	(Belarus) Anastasiya Yakimova	2	6	6
(Belarus) Iryna Kuryanovich	6	3	0
(Portugal) Michelle Larcher de Brito	6	6
(Czech Republic) Karolína Plíšková	4	4
(Germany) Sarah Gronert	6^{5}	6	5
PR	(Croatia) Jelena Pandžić	7	3	7
(Georgia (country)) Margalita Chakhnashvili	4	0
23	(Russia) Alexandra Panova	6	6

Second round
16	(Belarus) Anastasiya Yakimova	0	0
(Portugal) Michelle Larcher de Brito	6	6
PR	(Croatia) Jelena Pandžić	2	3
23	(Russia) Alexandra Panova	6	6

Qualifying competition
(Portugal) Michelle Larcher de Brito	2	6	6
23	(Russia) Alexandra Panova	6	3	3
