= 2010 US Open – Men's singles qualifying =

Men's singles qualifying
- 2010 US Open

Events
Singles	men	women		boys	girls
Doubles	men	women	mixed	boys	girls
WC Singles	men	women	quad
WC Doubles	men	women	quad
Legends	men	women	mixed

Qualification
Singles	men	women
- US Open

== Seeds ==
1. (Turkey) Marsel İlhan (first round)
2. (Japan) Go Soeda (first round)
3. (Slovakia) Karol Beck (first round)
4. (France) Édouard Roger-Vasselin (first round)
5. (Italy) Simone Bolelli (first round)
6. (Slovenia) Grega Žemlja (first round)
7. (Romania) Adrian Ungur (first round)
8. (France) David Guez (qualifying competition)
9. (Lithuania) Ričardas Berankis (qualified)
10. (Portugal) Rui Machado (second round)
11. (Argentina) Federico del Bonis (first round)
12. (Switzerland) Stéphane Bohli (second round)
13. (Austria) Martin Fischer (first round)
14. (Serbia) Ilija Bozoljac (qualifying competition)
15. (Paraguay) Ramón Delgado (second round)
16. (Brazil) João Souza (first round)
17. (France) Josselin Ouanna (second round)
18. (Colombia) Carlos Salamanca (first round)
19. (Austria) Stefan Koubek (second round)
20. (Brazil) Thiago Alves (first round)
21. (Spain) Daniel Muñoz de la Nava (qualifying competition)
22. (United States) Robert Kendrick (qualified)
23. (Croatia) Ivan Dodig (qualified)
24. (Japan) Kei Nishikori (qualified)
25. (United States) Kevin Kim (qualifying competition)
26. (France) Adrian Mannarino (qualified)
27. (Republic of Ireland) Conor Niland (second round)
28. (United States) Rajeev Ram (first round)
29. (Belarus) Uladzimir Ignatik (second round)
30. (South Africa) Izak van der Merwe (first round)
31. (Germany) Mischa Zverev (first round)
32. (France) Benoît Paire (qualified)

== Qualifiers ==
1. (Croatia) Ivan Dodig
2. (Czech Republic) Lukáš Rosol
3. (Canada) Peter Polansky
4. (Czech Republic) Dušan Lojda
5. (Austria) Andreas Haider-Maurer
6. (Brazil) Júlio Silva
7. (Slovakia) Martin Kližan
8. (Canada) Milos Raonic
9. (Lithuania) Ričardas Berankis
10. (United States) Ryan Harrison
11. (United States) Robert Kendrick
12. (Japan) Kei Nishikori
13. (France) Adrian Mannarino
14. (South Africa) Rik de Voest
15. (France) Benoît Paire
16. (France) Marc Gicquel

== Qualifying draw ==
Key

- Q = Qualifier
- WC = Wild card
- LL = Lucky loser
- Alt = Alternate
- ITF = ITF entry
- PR = Protected ranking
- SR = Special ranking
- SE = Special exempt
- JE = Junior exempt
- JR = Junior Accelerator Programme entrant
- CO = College Accelerator Programme entrant
- NG = Next Gen Accelerator Program entrant
- w/o = Walkover
- r = Retired
- d = Defaulted

=== First qualifier ===
First round
1	(Turkey) Marsel İlhan	0	6	3
(Australia) Bernard Tomic	6	2	6
WC	(United States) Steve Johnson	4	2
(Israel) Noam Okun	6	6
(United Kingdom) Alex Bogdanovic	6	2^{r}
WC	(United States) Blake Strode	3	5
(Argentina) Juan Pablo Brzezicki	3	6^{4}
23	(Croatia) Ivan Dodig	6	7^{7}

Second round
(Australia) Bernard Tomic	6	3	2
(Israel) Noam Okun	1	6	6
WC	(United States) Blake Strode	5	5
23	(Croatia) Ivan Dodig	7	7

Qualifying Round
(Israel) Noam Okun	4	3
23	(Croatia) Ivan Dodig	6	6

=== Second qualifier ===
First round
2	(Japan) Go Soeda	4	6	2
(Japan) Yūichi Sugita	6	2	6
(Argentina) Facundo Bagnis	4	6^{6}
(United States) Jesse Witten	6	7^{8}
(Hungary) Attila Balázs	3	1
(Italy) Matteo Viola	6	6
(Czech Republic) Lukáš Rosol	6^{4}	6	6
28	(United States) Rajeev Ram	7^{7}	2	2

Second round
(Japan) Yūichi Sugita	6^{4}	6	6
(United States) Jesse Witten	7^{7}	3	3
(Italy) Matteo Viola	5	2
(Czech Republic) Lukáš Rosol	7	6

Qualifying Round
(Japan) Yūichi Sugita	1	2
(Czech Republic) Lukáš Rosol	6	6

=== Third qualifier ===
First round
3	(Slovakia) Karol Beck	5	3
(Australia) Marinko Matosevic	7	6
(Australia) John Millman	7	6
(Russia) Evgeny Kirillov	5	1
(Mexico) Santiago González	1	3
(Canada) Peter Polansky	6	6
(Croatia) Franko Škugor	6	6
18	(Colombia) Carlos Salamanca	4	4

Second round
(Australia) Marinko Matosevic	6	1	5
(Australia) John Millman	2	6	7
(Canada) Peter Polansky	6	5	6
(Croatia) Franko Škugor	2	7	4

Qualifying Round
(Australia) John Millman	3	6	0
(Canada) Peter Polansky	6	4	6

=== Fourth qualifier ===
First round
4	(France) Édouard Roger-Vasselin	6	4	0
(Australia) Greg Jones	2	6	6
(New Zealand) Daniel King-Turner	2	2
(Czech Republic) Dušan Lojda	6	6
(Germany) Andre Begemann	6	1	2
(Colombia) Robert Farah	3	6	6
WC	(United States) Jarmere Jenkins	7^{7}	2	3
17	(France) Josselin Ouanna	6^{4}	6	6

Second round
(Australia) Greg Jones	5	6	3
(Czech Republic) Dušan Lojda	7	3	6
(Colombia) Robert Farah	6	6
17	(France) Josselin Ouanna	4	2

Qualifying Round
(Czech Republic) Dušan Lojda	7	6
(Colombia) Robert Farah	5	4

=== Fifth qualifier ===
First round
5	(Italy) Simone Bolelli	6	2	2
(Austria) Andreas Haider-Maurer	3	6	6
(Poland) Jerzy Janowicz	6	6
(Denmark) Frederik Nielsen	4	3
(United States) Alex Kuznetsov	4	2
(Italy) Flavio Cipolla	6	6
(Monaco) Benjamin Balleret	7^{9}	6^{2}	6^{3}
21	(Spain) Daniel Muñoz de la Nava	6^{7}	7^{7}	7^{7}

Second round
(Austria) Andreas Haider-Maurer	7^{7}	6
(Poland) Jerzy Janowicz	6^{4}	4
(Italy) Flavio Cipolla	3	6	5
21	(Spain) Daniel Muñoz de la Nava	6	3	7

Qualifying Round
(Austria) Andreas Haider-Maurer	4	6	6
21	(Spain) Daniel Muñoz de la Nava	6	4	3

=== Sixth qualifier ===
First round
6	(Slovenia) Grega Žemlja	6	2	2
(Brazil) Júlio Silva	3	6	6
(France) Alexandre Sidorenko	6	2	6
(Morocco) Reda El Amrani	2	6	3
(Australia) Matthew Ebden	3	2
(France) Nicolas Mahut	6	6
WC	(United States) Jordan Cox	7^{7}	4	3
29	(Belarus) Uladzimir Ignatik	6^{5}	6	6

Second round
(Brazil) Júlio Silva	6	6
(France) Alexandre Sidorenko	3	2
(France) Nicolas Mahut	6^{4}	7^{7}	6
29	(Belarus) Uladzimir Ignatik	7^{7}	6^{5}	2

Qualifying Round
(Brazil) Júlio Silva	6	3	6
(France) Nicolas Mahut	4	6	3

=== Seventh qualifier ===
First round
7	(Romania) Adrian Ungur	3	4
(Italy) Simone Vagnozzi	6	6
(Ukraine) Ivan Sergeyev	2	6	7^{7}
(France) Vincent Millot	6	4	6^{2}
(Spain) Pedro Clar-Rosselló	6	6^{5}	6
(Italy) Daniele Giorgini	4	7^{7}	4
(Slovakia) Martin Kližan	6	6
30	(South Africa) Izak van der Merwe	4	3

Second round
(Italy) Simone Vagnozzi	6	6
(Ukraine) Ivan Sergeyev	2	2
(Spain) Pedro Clar-Rosselló	4	3
(Slovakia) Martin Kližan	6	6

Qualifying Round
(Italy) Simone Vagnozzi	2	4
(Slovakia) Martin Kližan	6	6

=== Eighth qualifier ===
First round
8	(France) David Guez	6^{7}	6	2
(Ukraine) Sergei Bubka	7^{9}	0	0^{r}
(Israel) Harel Levy	3	7^{8}	6
(United States) Lester Cook	6	6^{6}	2
(Belgium) Niels Desein	1	1
(United States) Alex Bogomolov Jr.	6	6
(Canada) Milos Raonic	6	6
31	(Germany) Mischa Zverev	4	3

Second round
8	(France) David Guez	6	6
(Israel) Harel Levy	2	1
(United States) Alex Bogomolov Jr.	2	6^{9}
(Canada) Milos Raonic	6	7^{11}

Qualifying Round
8	(France) David Guez	5	4
(Canada) Milos Raonic	7	6

=== Ninth qualifier ===
First round
9	(Lithuania) Ričardas Berankis	7	6
(Colombia) Juan Sebastián Cabal	5	3
(Germany) Bastian Knittel	7^{7}	6
WC	(United States) Alexander Domijan	6^{2}	4
(United States) Jesse Levine	4	0^{r}
(Brazil) Caio Zampieri	6	2
(Australia) Brydan Klein	3	1
25	(United States) Kevin Kim	6	6

Second round
9	(Lithuania) Ričardas Berankis	6	7
(Germany) Bastian Knittel	3	5
(Brazil) Caio Zampieri	2	3
25	(United States) Kevin Kim	6	6

Qualifying Round
9	(Lithuania) Ričardas Berankis	6	6
25	(United States) Kevin Kim	1	3

=== Tenth qualifier ===
First round
10	(Portugal) Rui Machado	6	6
(Australia) Nick Lindahl	2	4
(United States) Ryan Harrison	6	6
(France) Jonathan Dasnières de Veigy	1	4
(Brazil) Ricardo Hocevar	7^{7}	3	6
WC	(United States) Greg Ouellette	6^{4}	6	1
(Spain) David Marrero	0	4
27	(Republic of Ireland) Conor Niland	6	6

Second round
10	(Portugal) Rui Machado	7	6^{5}	3
(United States) Ryan Harrison	5	7^{7}	6
(Brazil) Ricardo Hocevar	7	6
27	(Republic of Ireland) Conor Niland	5	2

Qualifying Round
(United States) Ryan Harrison	4	6	6
(Brazil) Ricardo Hocevar	6	3	4

=== Eleventh qualifier ===
First round
11	(Argentina) Federico del Bonis	3	6	3
WC	(United States) Chase Buchanan	6	3	6
(Japan) Tatsuma Ito	6	6
WC	(United States) Andrea Collarini	4	2
(Croatia) Nikola Mektić	6	6
WC	(United States) Johannes Robert van Overbeek	4	0
(Netherlands) Matwé Middelkoop	4	0
22	(United States) Robert Kendrick	6	6

Second round
WC	(United States) Chase Buchanan	1	2
(Japan) Tatsuma Ito	6	6
(Croatia) Nikola Mektić	4	5
22	(United States) Robert Kendrick	6	7

Qualifying Round
(Japan) Tatsuma Ito	3	3
22	(United States) Robert Kendrick	6	6

=== Twelfth qualifier ===
First round
12	(Switzerland) Stéphane Bohli	6	6
(Russia) Evgeny Donskoy	3	3
PR	(Canada) Frank Dancevic	6	6
(Czech Republic) Ivo Minář	2	3
(Belgium) Yannick Mertens	4	7	2
(Russia) Alexander Kudryavtsev	6	5	6
(Chile) Paul Capdeville	3	7	2
24	(Japan) Kei Nishikori	6	5	6

Second round
12	(Switzerland) Stéphane Bohli	6	5	6^{0}
PR	(Canada) Frank Dancevic	3	7	7^{7}
(Russia) Alexandre Kudryavtsev	3	6^{1}
24	(Japan) Kei Nishikori	6	7^{7}

Qualifying Round
PR	(Canada) Frank Dancevic	4	1
24	(Japan) Kei Nishikori	6	6

=== Thirteenth qualifier ===
First round
13	(Austria) Martin Fischer	3	3
(Switzerland) Michael Lammer	6	6
(Czech Republic) Jan Hernych	6	3	6
(Italy) Riccardo Ghedin	4	6	3
PR	(Australia) Chris Guccione	6^{4}	3
PR	(United States) Bobby Reynolds	7^{7}	6
(Germany) Dieter Kindlmann	4	4
26	(France) Adrian Mannarino	6	6

Second round
(Switzerland) Michael Lammer	6	4	6
(Czech Republic) Jan Hernych	2	6	4
PR	(United States) Bobby Reynolds	6	5	4
26	(France) Adrian Mannarino	4	7	6

Qualifying Round
(Switzerland) Michael Lammer	6	4	1
26	(France) Adrian Mannarino	1	6	6

=== Fourteenth qualifier ===
First round
14	(Serbia) Ilija Bozoljac	6^{2}	6	6
(France) Olivier Patience	7^{7}	4	3
(Portugal) Leonardo Tavares	4	2
(Spain) Guillermo Alcaide	6	6
(South Africa) Rik de Voest	6	6
(Croatia) Antonio Veić	1	0
(Ecuador) Giovanni Lapentti	4	1
19	(Austria) Stefan Koubek	6	6

Second round
14	(Serbia) Ilija Bozoljac	6	6
(Spain) Guillermo Alcaide	3	2
(South Africa) Rik de Voest	6	6
19	(Austria) Stefan Koubek	4	4

Qualifying Round
14	(Serbia) Ilija Bozoljac	3	6^{8}
(South Africa) Rik de Voest	6	7^{10}

=== Fifteenth qualifier ===
First round
15	(Paraguay) Ramón Delgado	6^{5}	7^{13}	6
(Austria) Alexander Peya	7^{7}	6^{11}	3
(Netherlands) Igor Sijsling	6	6
(France) Charles-Antoine Brézac	3	3
(Czech Republic) Jaroslav Pospíšil	2	4
(Serbia) Filip Krajinović	6	6
(Germany) Simon Stadler	3	5
32	(France) Benoît Paire	6	7

Second round
15	(Paraguay) Ramón Delgado	4	3
(Netherlands) Igor Sijsling	6	6
(Serbia) Filip Krajinović	6	3	2
32	(France) Benoît Paire	4	6	6

Qualifying Round
(Netherlands) Igor Sijsling	6	2	1
32	(France) Benoît Paire	1	6	6

=== Sixteenth qualifier ===
First round
16	(Brazil) João Souza	3	2
(United Kingdom) Jamie Baker	6	6
(France) Marc Gicquel	1	6	6
(Spain) Adrián Menéndez Maceiras	6	1	1
PR	(United States) Amer Delic	2	4
(United States) Michael Yani	6	6
(Belgium) Ruben Bemelmans	6	7
20	(Brazil) Thiago Alves	3	5

Second round
(United Kingdom) Jamie Baker	2	4
(France) Marc Gicquel	6	6
(United States) Michael Yani	6^{5}	3
(Belgium) Ruben Bemelmans	7^{7}	6

Qualifying Round
(France) Marc Gicquel	4	7^{8}	6
(Belgium) Ruben Bemelmans	6	6^{6}	3
