= Tang Haochen =

Chinese tennis player

Tang Haochen 唐好辰
- Country (sports): China
- Born: 21 February 1994 (age 32) Zhengzhou, China
- Plays: Right-handed (two-handed backhand)
- Prize money: $82,950

Singles
- Career record: 129–92
- Career titles: 2 ITF
- Highest ranking: No. 371 (15 December 2014)

Grand Slam singles results
- Australian Open: 1R (2014)
- Australian Open Junior: SF (2010)
- French Open Junior: 1R (2011)
- Wimbledon Junior: Q2 (2011)
- US Open Junior: 3R (2010)

Doubles
- Career record: 67–66
- Career titles: 4 ITF
- Highest ranking: No. 211 (15 July 2013)

Grand Slam doubles results
- Australian Open Junior: 2R (2010, 2011)
- French Open Junior: SF (2011)
- Wimbledon Junior: F (2011)
- US Open Junior: SF (2010)

Team competitions
- Fed Cup: 7–7

Tang Haochen (Chinese: 唐好辰; pinyin: Táng Hǎochén; Mandarin pronunciation: [tʰǎŋ xàʊ ʈʂʰə̌n]; born 21 February 1994) is a former tennis player from China.

Tang has won two singles and four doubles titles on the ITF Circuit. On 15 December 2014, she reached her best singles ranking of world No. 371. On 15 July 2013, she peaked at No. 211 in the doubles rankings.

Playing for China Fed Cup team, Tang has accumulated a win–loss record of 7–7.

She qualified for a place in the main draw of the singles event for the 2014 Australian Open when she won the Asia-Pacific Australian Open Wildcard Playoff, defeating Risa Ozaki in the final, and was drawn against 30th seed Eugenie Bouchard, with the Canadian going through in straight sets.

== ITF Circuit finals ==
=== Singles: 6 (2 titles, 4 runner-ups) ===
Legend $15,000 tournaments $10,000 tournaments	Finals by surface Hard (1–4) Clay (1–0)

Outcome	No.	Date	Tournament	Surface	Opponent	Score
Runner-up	1.	21 December 2013	ITF Hong Kong	Hard	(China) Xu Shilin	1–6, 4–6
Winner	1.	23 March 2014	ITF Shenzhen, China	Hard	(China) Zhang Kailin	6–3, 6–2
Runner-up	2.	8 March 2015	ITF Jiangmen, China	Hard	(Norway) Emma Flood	6–7^{(7)}, 3–6
Winner	2.	26 June 2016	ITF Anning, China	Clay	(China) Lu Jiaxi	6–3, 2–6, 6–3
Runner-up	3.	23 July 2016	ITF Hong Kong	Hard	(Japan) Ayano Shimizu	6–1, 4–6, 0–6
Runner-up	3.	4 March 2017	ITF Nanjing, China	Hard	(China) Gao Xinyu	4–6, 3–6

=== Doubles: 9 (4 titles, 5 runner-ups) ===
Legend $25,000 tournaments $15,000 tournaments $10,000 tournaments	Finals by surface Hard (4–4) Clay (0–1) Carpet (0–0)

Outcome	No.	Date	Tournament	Surface	Partner	Opponents	Score
Runner-up	1.	18 February 2012	ITF Antalya, Turkey	Clay	(China) Li Yihong	(China) Yang Zhaoxuan (China) Zhang Kailin	6–7^{(6)}, 7–5, [8–10]
Winner	1.	4 January 2013	ITF Hong Kong	Hard	(China) Tian Ran	(Japan) Eri Hozumi (Japan) Miyu Kato	6–2, 6–1
Runner-up	2.	25 May 2013	ITF Tarakan, Indonesia	Hard (i)	(China) Tian Ran	(United Kingdom) Naomi Broady (Serbia) Teodora Mirčić	2–6, 6–1, [5–10]
Runner-up	3.	14 February 2014	ITF Nonthaburi, Thailand	Hard	(China) Tian Ran	(Thailand) Varatchaya Wongteanchai (Hong Kong) Zhang Ling	6–2, 2–6, [10–12]
Runner-up	4.	2 January 2015	ITF Hong Kong	Hard	(China) Ye Qiuyu	(Japan) Mana Ayukawa (Japan) Makoto Ninomiya	6–7^{(4)}, 6–2, [7–10]
Winner	2.	20 February 2015	ITF New Delhi, India	Hard	(China) Yang Zhaoxuan	(Chinese Taipei) Hsu Ching-wen (Chinese Taipei) Lee Pei-chi	7–5, 6–1
Winner	3.	6 March 2015	ITF Jiangmen, China	Hard	(Chinese Taipei) Hsu Ching-wen	(China) Jiang Xinyu (China) Tang Qianhui	6–4, 6–3
Winner	4.	13 August 2016	ITF Naiman, China	Hard (i)	(China) Zhang Yukun	(China) Sun Xuliu (China) Xun Fangying	7–6^{(0)}, 4–6, [10–4]
Runner-up	5.	24 February 2017	ITF Nanjing, China	Hard	(China) Guo Hanyu	(China) Li Yihong (China) Zhang Ying	7–5, 3–6, [3–10]

== Junior Grand Slam finals ==
=== Girls' doubles ===
Outcome	Year	Championship	Surface	Partner	Opponents	Score
Runner-up	2011	Wimbledon	Grass	(Netherlands) Demi Schuurs	(Canada) Eugenie Bouchard (United States) Grace Min	7–5, 2–6, 5–7
