= 2010 US Open – Girls' singles =

Girls' singles
- 2010 US Open

Final
- Champion: (Russia) Daria Gavrilova
- Runner-up: (Russia) Yulia Putintseva
- Score: 6–3, 6–2

Events
Singles	men	women		boys	girls
Doubles	men	women	mixed	boys	girls
WC Singles	men	women	quad
WC Doubles	men	women	quad
Legends	men	women	mixed
- US Open

The girls' singles tournament of the 2010 US Open started on Sunday September 5, the seventh day of the main tournament.

Heather Watson was the defending champion, but was no longer eligible to compete as a junior that year.

Daria Gavrilova won this event, after beating her compatriot Yulia Putintseva in the final, 6–3, 6–2.

== Seeds ==
1. (Russia) Daria Gavrilova (champion)
2. (Hungary) Tímea Babos (second round)
3. (Russia) Irina Khromacheva (second round)
4. (Ukraine) Elina Svitolina (third round)
5. (Puerto Rico) Monica Puig (quarterfinals)
6. (Czech Republic) Karolína Plíšková (quarterfinals)
7. (Czech Republic) Kristýna Plíšková (second round)
8. (United Kingdom) Laura Robson (third round)
9. (Canada) Gabriela Dabrowski (third round)
10. (Slovakia) Jana Čepelová (second round)
11. (Belgium) An-Sophie Mestach (first round)
12. (China) Zheng Saisai (first round)
13. (China) Tang Haochen (third round)
14. (United States) Beatrice Capra (withdrew due to fatigue after playing three rounds in the women's singles event)
15. (United States) Sloane Stephens (semifinals)
16. (Spain) María Teresa Torró Flor (first round)

== Draw ==
Key

- Q = Qualifier
- WC = Wild card
- LL = Lucky loser
- Alt = Alternate
- ITF = ITF entry
- PR = Protected ranking
- SR = Special ranking
- SE = Special exempt
- JE = Junior exempt
- JR = Junior Accelerator Programme entrant
- CO = College Accelerator Programme entrant
- NG = Next Gen Accelerator Program entrant
- w/o = Walkover
- r = Retired
- d = Defaulted

=== Finals ===
Quarterfinals
1	(Russia) Daria Gavrilova	6	6
Q	(United States) Robin Anderson	4	4
15	(United States) Sloane Stephens	3	6	6
6	(Czech Republic) Karolína Plíšková	6	4	3
(France) Caroline Garcia	2	4
(Tunisia) Ons Jabeur	6	6
5	(Puerto Rico) Monica Puig	2	4
(Russia) Yulia Putintseva	6	6

Semifinals
1	(Russia) Daria Gavrilova	7	1	7^{7}
15	(United States) Sloane Stephens	5	6	6^{4}
(Tunisia) Ons Jabeur	4	3
(Russia) Yulia Putintseva	6	6

Final
1	(Russia) Daria Gavrilova	6	6
(Russia) Yulia Putintseva	3	2

=== Top half ===
==== Section 1 ====
First round
1	(Russia) Daria Gavrilova	6	6
(United States) Lauren Davis	3	1
(Madagascar) Zarah Razafimahatratra	3	3
WC	(United States) Caroline Price	6	6
WC	(United States) Jessica Pegula	5	7^{8}	2
Q	(Uzbekistan) Nigina Abduraimova	7	6^{6}	6
(Venezuela) Adriana Pérez	2	3
13	(China) Tang Haochen	6	6
11	(Belgium) An-Sophie Mestach	4	4
Q	(United States) Robin Anderson	6	6
(Japan) Maho Kowase	4	4
WC	(United States) Kyle McPhillips	6	6
Q	(United States) Chanelle Van Nguyen	6	7^{7}
(Czech Republic) Petra Rohanová	1	6^{1}
(Slovakia) Anna Karolína Schmiedlová	2	1
8	(United Kingdom) Laura Robson	6	6

Second round
1	(Russia) D Gavrilova	6	2	6
WC	(United States) C Price	2	6	1
Q	(Uzbekistan) N Abduraimova	2	4
13	(China) H Tang	6	6
Q	(United States) R Anderson	6	6
WC	(United States) K McPhillips	3	0
Q	(United States) C Van Nguyen	3	6^{3}
8	(United Kingdom) L Robson	6	7^{7}

Third round
1	(Russia) D Gavrilova	7	6
13	(China) H Tang	5	2
Q	(United States) R Anderson	6	6
8	(United Kingdom) L Robson	3	2

Quarterfinals
1	(Russia) D Gavrilova	6	6
Q	(United States) R Anderson	4	4

==== Section 2 ====
First round
4	(Ukraine) Elina Svitolina	6	7^{7}
(Canada) Katarena Paliivets	2	6^{4}
(Norway) Ulrikke Eikeri	5	0
WC	(United States) Ellen Tsay	7	6
(China) Tian Ran	6	5	6
(Russia) Margarita Gasparyan	3	7	2
(Croatia) Silvia Njirić	1	3
15	(United States) Sloane Stephens	6	6
10	(Slovakia) Jana Čepelová	6	6
(Belarus) Ilona Kremen	4	2
(United States) Grace Min	6^{5}	0
(Paraguay) Verónica Cepede Royg	7^{7}	6
Q	(United States) Julia Elbaba	3	6^{2}
(Japan) Eri Hozumi	6	7^{7}
(Serbia) Saška Gavrilovška	4	1
6	(Czech Republic) Karolína Plíšková	6	6

Second round
4	(Ukraine) E Svitolina	7	6
WC	(United States) E Tsay	6	0
(China) R Tian	3	5
15	(United States) S Stephens	6	7
10	(Slovakia) J Čepelová	4	6	2
(Paraguay) V Cepede Royg	6	4	6
(Japan) E Hozumi	0	3
6	(Czech Republic) Ka Plíšková	6	6

Third round
4	(Ukraine) E Svitolina	4	0
15	(United States) S Stephens	6	6
(Paraguay) V Cepede Royg	3	0
6	(Czech Republic) Ka Plíšková	6	6

Quarterfinals
15	(United States) S Stephens	3	6	6
6	(Czech Republic) Ka Plíšková	6	4	3

=== Bottom half ===
==== Section 3 ====
First round
7	(Czech Republic) Kristýna Plíšková	7	6
(Ukraine) Ganna Poznikhirenko	5	1
(France) Caroline Garcia	6	6
(United States) Monica Turewicz	3	2
Q	(Uzbekistan) Sabina Sharipova	0	1
Q	(United States) Brooke Austin	6	6
WC	(United States) Sachia Vickery	6	6
12	(China) Zheng Saisai	2	3
LL	(United States) Gabrielle Desimone	1	6^{4}
(Montenegro) Danka Kovinić	6	7^{7}
(Canada) Eugénie Bouchard	6	6
(Venezuela) Andrea Gámiz	2	3
(Tunisia) Ons Jabeur	6	6
Q	(Japan) Risa Ozaki	1	2
WC	(United States) Nicole Gibbs	4	6^{6}
3	(Russia) Irina Khromacheva	6	7^{8}

Second round
7	(Czech Republic) Kr Plíšková	5	4
(France) C Garcia	7	6
Q	(United States) B Austin	6	3	2
WC	(United States) S Vickery	4	6	6
(Montenegro) D Kovinić	2	0
(Canada) E Bouchard	6	6
(Tunisia) O Jabeur	6	6
3	(Russia) I Khromacheva	3	3

Third round
(France) C Garcia	6	6
WC	(United States) S Vickery	4	4
(Canada) E Bouchard	6	3	3
(Tunisia) O Jabeur	3	6	6

Quarterfinals
(France) C Garcia	2	4
(Tunisia) O Jabeur	6	6

==== Section 4 ====
First round
5	(Puerto Rico) Monica Puig	6	6
WC	(United States) Madison Keys	4	4
(Slovakia) Chantal Škamlová	5	3
(Ukraine) Anastasiya Vasylyeva	7	6
(Czech Republic) Denisa Allertová	4	6^{7}
(United States) Krista Hardebeck	6	7^{9}
Q	(Japan) Miyu Kato	0	2
9	(Canada) Gabriela Dabrowski	6	6
16	(Spain) María Teresa Torró Flor	5	3
(Romania) Cristina Dinu	7	6
(United States) Ester Goldfeld	7	2	1
(Japan) Emi Mutaguchi	5	6	6
WC	(United States) Victoria Duval	4	6	1
(Russia) Yulia Putintseva	6	4	6
(China) Yang Zi	6	3	2
2	(Hungary) Tímea Babos	4	6	6

Second round
5	(Puerto Rico) M Puig	6	6
(Ukraine) A Vasylyeva	3	0
(United States) K Hardebeck	5	6	5
9	(Canada) G Dabrowski	7	2	7
(Romania) C Dinu	6	6
(Japan) E Mutaguchi	1	1
(Russia) Y Putintseva	7	6
2	(Hungary) T Babos	5	3

Third round
5	(Puerto Rico) M Puig	7^{7}	6
9	(Canada) G Dabrowski	6^{3}	1
(Romania) C Dinu	2	3
(Russia) Y Putintseva	6	6

Quarterfinals
5	(Puerto Rico) M Puig	2	4
(Russia) Y Putintseva	6	6
