= 2010 US Open – Girls' doubles =

Girls' doubles
- 2010 US Open

Final
- Champions: (Hungary) Tímea Babos (United States) Sloane Stephens
- Runners-up: (Belgium) An-Sophie Mestach (Croatia) Silvia Njirić
- Score: walkover

Events
Singles	men	women		boys	girls
Doubles	men	women	mixed	boys	girls
WC Singles	men	women	quad
WC Doubles	men	women	quad
Legends	men	women	mixed
- US Open

Valeria Solovieva and Maryna Zanevska were the defending champions but did not enter the junior competition this year.

Tímea Babos and Sloane Stephens won the title, because their opponents An-Sophie Mestach and Silvia Njirić withdrew before the final match. This was their third Grand Slam girls' doubles title in the year after winning at the French Open and at the Wimbledon Championships. Babos has reached all four junior doubles finals in one single calendar year.

== Seeds ==
1. (Russia) Daria Gavrilova / (Russia) Irina Khromacheva (semifinals)
2. (Czech Republic) Karolína Plíšková / (Czech Republic) Kristýna Plíšková (first round)
3. (Hungary) Tímea Babos / (United States) Sloane Stephens (champions)
4. (France) Caroline Garcia / (Puerto Rico) Monica Puig (first round)
5. (Slovakia) Jana Čepelová / (Slovakia) Chantal Škamlová (quarterfinals)
6. (Paraguay) Verónica Cepede Royg / (Romania) Cristina Dinu (second round)
7. (Tunisia) Ons Jabeur / (Russia) Yulia Putintseva (quarterfinals)
8. (Canada) Eugenie Bouchard / (Canada) Gabriela Dabrowski (second round)

== Draw ==
Key

- Q = Qualifier
- WC = Wild card
- LL = Lucky loser
- Alt = Alternate
- ITF = ITF entry
- PR = Protected ranking
- SR = Special ranking
- SE = Special exempt
- JE = Junior exempt
- JR = Junior Accelerator Programme entrant
- CO = College Accelerator Programme entrant
- NG = Next Gen Accelerator Program entrant
- w/o = Walkover
- r = Retired
- d = Defaulted

=== Finals ===
Semifinals
1	(Russia) Daria Gavrilova (Russia) Irina Khromacheva	2	5
3	(Hungary) Tímea Babos (United States) Sloane Stephens	6	7
(Belgium) An-Sophie Mestach (Croatia) Silvia Njirić	6^{4}	6	[10]
(China) Tang Haochen (China) Tian Ran	7	4	[7]

Final
3	(Hungary) Tímea Babos (United States) Sloane Stephens	w/o
(Belgium) An-Sophie Mestach (Croatia) Silvia Njirić

=== Top half ===
First round
1	(Russia) D Gavrilova (Russia) I Khromacheva	7	6
WC	(United States) V Duval (United States) C Price	5	3
(Canada) K Paliivets (Venezuela) A Pérez	4	3
(Czech Republic) D Allertová (Belarus) I Kremen	6	6
(Japan) E Mutaguchi (Japan) R Ozaki	7	6
(United States) L Herring (United States) G Min	6^{1}	4
(United States) B Austin (Japan) M Kato	6^{5}	0
7	(Tunisia) O Jabeur (Russia) Y Putintseva	7	6
3	(Hungary) T Babos (United States) S Stephens	6	6
(United States) L Davis (Norway) U Eikeri	0	0
(United States) E Goldfeld (United States) C Van Nguyen	7	3	[11]
(Uzbekistan) N Abduraimova (Russia) M Gasparyan	5	6	[9]
WC	(United States) N Gibbs (United States) K McPhillips	6	4	[10]
(China) Z Yang (China) S Zheng	4	6	[6]
(United States) G Desimone (Russia) S Shumilina	1	2
8	(Canada) E Bouchard (Canada) G Dabrowski	6	6

Second round
1	(Russia) D Gavrilova (Russia) I Khromacheva	2	6	[10]
(Czech Republic) D Allertová (Belarus) I Kremen	6	0	[5]
(Japan) E Mutaguchi (Japan) R Ozaki	5	3
7	(Tunisia) O Jabeur (Russia) Y Putintseva	7	6
3	(Hungary) T Babos (United States) S Stephens	6	6
(United States) E Goldfeld (United States) C Van Nguyen	4	2
WC	(United States) N Gibbs (United States) K McPhillips	6	6
8	(Canada) E Bouchard (Canada) G Dabrowski	3	2

Quarterfinals
1	(Russia) D Gavrilova (Russia) I Khromacheva	7	6
7	(Tunisia) O Jabeur (Russia) Y Putintseva	6^{3}	4
3	(Hungary) T Babos (United States) S Stephens	6	6
WC	(United States) N Gibbs (United States) K McPhillips	2	2

Semifinals
1	(Russia) D Gavrilova (Russia) I Khromacheva	2	5
3	(Hungary) T Babos (United States) S Stephens	6	7

=== Bottom half ===
First round
5	(Slovakia) J Čepelová (Slovakia) C Škamlová	6	6
(Japan) E Hozumi (Japan) M Kowase	4	0
(Ukraine) E Svitolina (Ukraine) A Vasylyeva	4	6	[8]
WC	(United States) M Keys (United States) E Tsay	6	2	[10]
(Serbia) S Gavrilovška (Montenegro) D Kovinić	1	6	[8]
(United States) J Elbaba (United States) K Hardebeck	6	4	[10]
(Belgium) A-S Mestach (Croatia) S Njirić	6^{5}	6	[10]
4	(France) C Garcia (Puerto Rico) M Puig	7	2	[7]
6	(Paraguay) V Cepede Royg (Romania) C Dinu	6	6
(Czech Republic) P Rohanová (Slovakia) AK Schmiedlová	3	4
(Venezuela) A Gámiz (Spain) MT Torró Flor	2	2
(United States) R Anderson (United States) M Turewicz	6	6
(China) H Tang (China) R Tian	6	6
WC	(United States) G Andrews (United States) S Vickery	2	4
(Ukraine) G Poznikhirenko (Madagascar) Z Razafimahatratra	7	6
2	(Czech Republic) Ka Plíšková (Czech Republic) Kr Plíšková	6^{4}	3

Second round
5	(Slovakia) J Čepelová (Slovakia) C Škamlová	3	7	[11]
WC	(United States) M Keys (United States) E Tsay	6	5	[9]
(United States) J Elbaba (United States) K Hardebeck	1	3
(Belgium) A-S Mestach (Croatia) S Njirić	6	6
6	(Paraguay) V Cepede Royg (Romania) C Dinu	5	6^{5}
(United States) R Anderson (United States) M Turewicz	7	7
(China) H Tang (China) R Tian	4	7	[10]
(Ukraine) G Poznikhirenko (Madagascar) Z Razafimahatratra	6	6^{4}	[6]

Quarterfinals
5	(Slovakia) J Čepelová (Slovakia) C Škamlová	2	2
(Belgium) A-S Mestach (Croatia) S Njirić	6	6
(United States) R Anderson (United States) M Turewicz	6	2	[9]
(China) H Tang (China) R Tian	1	6	[11]

Semifinals
(Belgium) A-S Mestach (Croatia) S Njirić	6^{4}	6	[10]
(China) H Tang (China) R Tian	7	4	[7]
