= 2010 US Open – Wheelchair quad doubles =

Wheelchair quad doubles
- 2010 US Open

Final
- Champions: (United States) Nick Taylor (United States) David Wagner
- Runners-up: (Sweden) Johan Andersson (United Kingdom) Peter Norfolk
- Score: 7–5, 7–6^{(7–4)}

Events
| Singles | men | women | | boys | girls |
| Doubles | men | women | mixed | boys | girls |
| WC Singles | men | women | quad |
| WC Doubles | men | women | quad |
| Legends | men | women | mixed |
| ← 2009 · | US Open | · 2011 → |

Two-time defending champions Nick Taylor and David Wagner defeated Johan Andersson and Peter Norfolk in the final, 7–5, 7–6^{(7–4)} to win the quad doubles wheelchair tennis title at the 2010 US Open.

== Main draw ==
=== Key ===
- Q = Qualifier
- WC = Wild card
- LL = Lucky loser
- Alt = Alternate
- SE = Special exempt
- PR = Protected ranking
- ITF = ITF entry
- JE = Junior exempt
- w/o = Walkover
- r = Retired
- d = Defaulted
- SR = Special ranking

=== Final ===
| Finals |
| (United States) Nick Taylor (United States) David Wagner | 7 | 7^{7} |
| (Sweden) Johan Andersson (United Kingdom) Peter Norfolk | 5 | 6^{4} |
