= 2010 US Open – Men's singles =

Men's singles
- 2010 US Open

Final
- Champion: (Spain) Rafael Nadal
- Runner-up: (Serbia) Novak Djokovic
- Score: 6–4, 5–7, 6–4, 6–2

Details
- Draw: 128
- Seeds: 32

Events
Singles	men	women		boys	girls
Doubles	men	women	mixed	boys	girls
WC Singles	men	women	quad
WC Doubles	men	women	quad
Legends	men	women	mixed
- US Open

Rafael Nadal defeated Novak Djokovic in the final, 6–4, 5–7, 6–4, 6–2 to win the men's singles tennis title at the 2010 US Open. It was his first US Open title and ninth major title overall, becoming the seventh man to complete the career Grand Slam and the second to complete the career Golden Slam. (Note: At the age of 24 years, 3 months and 10 days old, Nadal was the youngest in the Open Era to complete the career Grand Slam at the time, until surpassed by 22-year-old Carlos Alcaraz at the 2026 Australian Open.) Nadal also became the first man to win the Surface Slam (majors on clay, grass, and hard courts in the same calendar year).

Nadal was also the youngest man to complete the Career Grand Slam at just 24 years, 102 days old. His compatriot, Carlos Alcaraz, would break his record at the 2026 Australian Open at 22 years, 272 days old.

Juan Martín del Potro was the reigning champion, but did not participate this year after undergoing a wrist operation in May and only starting to practice again in August. Del Potro thus became the third man in the Open Era not to attempt to defend the US Open title, after Ken Rosewall in 1971 and Pete Sampras in 2003.

For the first time in tournament history, no American man was seeded in the top eight.

== Seeds ==
1. (Spain) Rafael Nadal (champion)
2. (Switzerland) Roger Federer (semifinals)
3. (Serbia) Novak Djokovic (final)
4. (United Kingdom) Andy Murray (third round)
5. (Sweden) Robin Söderling (quarterfinals)
6. (Russia) Nikolay Davydenko (second round)
7. (Czech Republic) Tomáš Berdych (first round)
8. (Spain) Fernando Verdasco (quarterfinals)
9. (United States) Andy Roddick (second round)
10. (Spain) David Ferrer (fourth round)
11. (Croatia) Marin Čilić (second round)
12. (Russia) Mikhail Youzhny (semifinals)
13. (Austria) Jürgen Melzer (fourth round)
14. (Spain) Nicolás Almagro (third round)
15. (Croatia) Ivan Ljubičić (first round)
16. (Cyprus) Marcos Baghdatis (first round)

17. (France) Gaël Monfils (quarterfinals)
18. (United States) John Isner (third round)
19. (United States) Mardy Fish (fourth round)
20. (United States) Sam Querrey (fourth round)
21. (Spain) Albert Montañés (fourth round)
22. (Spain) Juan Carlos Ferrero (third round)
23. (Spain) Feliciano López (fourth round)
24. (Latvia) Ernests Gulbis (first round)
25. (Switzerland) Stan Wawrinka (quarterfinals)
26. (Brazil) Thomaz Bellucci (second round)
27. (Chile) Fernando González (first round, retired because of a knee injury)
28. (Czech Republic) Radek Štěpánek (first round)
29. (Germany) Philipp Kohlschreiber (second round)
30. (Argentina) Juan Mónaco (first round)
31. (Argentina) David Nalbandian (third round)
32. (Australia) Lleyton Hewitt (first round)

Click on the seed number of a player to go to their draw section.

== Main draw ==
Key

- Q = Qualifier
- WC = Wild card
- LL = Lucky loser
- Alt = Alternate
- ITF = ITF entry
- PR = Protected ranking
- SR = Special ranking
- SE = Special exempt
- JE = Junior exempt
- JR = Junior Accelerator Programme entrant
- CO = College Accelerator Programme entrant
- NG = Next Gen Accelerator Program entrant
- w/o = Walkover
- r = Retired
- d = Defaulted

=== Finals ===
Quarterfinals
1	(Spain) Rafael Nadal	7	6	6
8	(Spain) Fernando Verdasco	5	3	4
25	(Switzerland) Stan Wawrinka	6	6^{7}	6	3	3
12	(Russia) Mikhail Youzhny	3	7^{9}	3	6	6
17	(France) Gaël Monfils	6^{2}	1	2
3	(Serbia) Novak Djokovic	7^{7}	6	6
5	(Sweden) Robin Söderling	4	4	5
2	(Switzerland) Roger Federer	6	6	7

Semifinals
1	(Spain) Rafael Nadal	6	6	6
12	(Russia) Mikhail Youzhny	2	3	4
3	(Serbia) Novak Djokovic	5	6	5	6	7
2	(Switzerland) Roger Federer	7	1	7	2	5

Final
1	(Spain) Rafael Nadal	6	5	6	6
3	(Serbia) Novak Djokovic	4	7	4	2

=== Top half ===
==== Section 1 ====
First round
1	(Spain) R Nadal	7^{7}	7^{7}	6
(Russia) T Gabashvili	6^{4}	6^{4}	3
PR	(Argentina) M González	5	5	1
(Uzbekistan) D Istomin	7	7	6
(France) G Simon	6	6	6
WC	(United States) D Young	1	4	2
(Germany) T Kamke	2	6	2	4
29	(Germany) P Kohlschreiber	6	4	6	6
23	(Spain) F López	6	6	6
(Colombia) S Giraldo	4	4	4
(Germany) R Schüttler	3	3	6	6	6^{2}
Q	(France) B Paire	6	6	4	3	7^{7}
(Ukraine) S Stakhovsky	6^{8}	7	6	6
(Australia) P Luczak	7^{10}	5	4	2
Q	(United States) R Harrison	6	6^{4}	6	6
15	(Croatia) I Ljubičić	3	7^{7}	3	4

Second round
1	(Spain) R Nadal	6	7^{7}	7
(Uzbekistan) D Istomin	2	6^{5}	5
(France) G Simon	4	6	1	6	6
29	(Germany) P Kohlschreiber	6	3	6	1	3
23	(Spain) F López	6	6^{4}	5	7^{7}	6
Q	(France) B Paire	4	7^{7}	7	6^{3}	2
(Ukraine) S Stakhovsky	6	5	3	6	7^{8}
Q	(United States) R Harrison	3	7	6	3	6^{6}

Third round
1	(Spain) R Nadal	6	6	6
(France) G Simon	4	4	2
23	(Spain) F López	6	4
(Ukraine) S Stakhovsky	3	0^{r}

Fourth round
1	(Spain) R Nadal	6	6	6
23	(Spain) F López	3	4	4

==== Section 2 ====
First round
10	(Spain) D Ferrer	6	6	6
(Ukraine) A Dolgopolov	2	2	3
(Germany) B Becker	7^{7}	7^{7}	6
(Germany) D Brands	6^{1}	6^{5}	4
(Finland) J Nieminen	6^{1}	4	3
(Spain) D Gimeno Traver	7^{7}	6	6
(France) J Chardy	6	7^{7}	6
24	(Latvia) E Gulbis	2	6^{1}	4
31/PR	(Argentina) D Nalbandian	7^{7}	3	6	6^{6}	6
Q	(South Africa) R de Voest	6^{4}	6	4	7^{7}	4
(France) F Serra	7	6	6
(Germany) F Mayer	5	2	0
(Spain) P Riba	6	1	4	6	6^{1}
Q	(France) A Mannarino	3	6	6	4	7^{7}
(Italy) F Fognini	6	5	1	6	3
8	(Spain) F Verdasco	1	7	6	4	6

Second round
10	(Spain) D Ferrer	6	6	6
(Germany) B Becker	3	4	4
(Spain) D Gimeno Traver	4	6	6	7^{7}
(France) J Chardy	6	2	0	6^{2}
31/PR	(Argentina) D Nalbandian	7	6	6
(France) F Serra	5	4	2
Q	(France) A Mannarino	1	2	2
8	(Spain) F Verdasco	6	6	6

Third round
10	(Spain) D Ferrer	7^{7}	6	6
(Spain) D Gimeno Traver	6^{2}	2	2
31/PR	(Argentina) D Nalbandian	2	6	3	2
8	(Spain) F Verdasco	6	3	6	6

Fourth round
10	(Spain) D Ferrer	7	7^{10}	3	3	6^{4}
8	(Spain) F Verdasco	5	6^{8}	6	6	7^{7}

==== Section 3 ====
First round
4	(United Kingdom) A Murray	6	6	6
(Slovakia) L Lacko	3	2	2
(Spain) R Ramírez Hidalgo	4	6^{6}	5
(Jamaica) D Brown	6	7^{8}	7
(Argentina) JI Chela	6	4	6	6
(Chinese Taipei) Y-h Lu	4	6	3	3
(Kazakhstan) M Kukushkin	3	2	2
25	(Switzerland) S Wawrinka	6	6	6
20	(United States) S Querrey	6	4	7	6
WC	(United States) B Klahn	3	6	5	4
(Spain) M Granollers	2	5	6	6	6
(Italy) A Seppi	6	7	3	2	3
(Spain) G García López	6	6	7^{7}
(Poland) Ł Kubot	3	2	6^{4}
(Italy) P Starace	6	4	4	6^{5}
14	(Spain) N Almagro	4	6	6	7^{7}

Second round
4	(United Kingdom) A Murray	7	6	6
(Jamaica) D Brown	5	3	0
(Argentina) JI Chela	5	3	4
25	(Switzerland) S Wawrinka	7	6	6
20	(United States) S Querrey	6	6	6
(Spain) M Granollers	2	3	4
(Spain) G García-López	3	6^{5}	6	6^{4}
14	(Spain) N Almagro	6	7^{7}	4	7^{7}

Third round
4	(United Kingdom) A Murray	7^{7}	6^{4}	3	3
25	(Switzerland) S Wawrinka	6^{3}	7^{7}	6	6
20	(United States) S Querrey	6	6	6
14	(Spain) N Almagro	3	4	4

Fourth round
25	(Switzerland) S Wawrinka	7^{11}	6^{5}	7	4	6
20	(United States) S Querrey	6^{9}	7^{7}	5	6	4

==== Section 4 ====
First round
12	(Russia) M Youzhny	6	6	6
(Kazakhstan) A Golubev	2	3	3
(Israel) D Sela	7^{7}	7	6
(Belgium) X Malisse	6^{1}	5	2
WC	(United States) J Sock	1	4	6	1
(Switzerland) M Chiudinelli	6	6	1	6
(Portugal) F Gil	4	3	4
18	(United States) J Isner	6	6	6
28	(Czech Republic) R Štěpánek	4	2	6	4
(France) J Benneteau	6	6	4	6
(Spain) T Robredo	6	6	6
Q	(Czech Republic) L Rosol	4	3	1
(Romania) V Hănescu	6	6	6
(Argentina) C Berlocq	2	4	3
(France) M Llodra	7^{7}	6	6
7	(Czech Republic) T Berdych	6^{3}	4	4

Second round
12	(Russia) M Youzhny	6	6	4	6
(Israel) D Sela	1	3	6	3
(Switzerland) M Chiudinelli	3	6	6^{7}	4
18	(United States) J Isner	6	3	7^{9}	6
(France) J Benneteau	4	6^{r}
(Spain) T Robredo	6	6
(Romania) V Hănescu	6^{2}	4	2
(France) M Llodra	7^{7}	6	6

Third round
12	(Russia) M Youzhny	6	6^{7}	7^{7}	6
18	(United States) J Isner	4	7^{9}	6^{5}	4
(Spain) T Robredo	3	7^{8}	6	2
(France) M Llodra	6	6^{6}	4	1^{r}

Fourth round
12	(Russia) M Youzhny	7	6	4	6
(Spain) T Robredo	5	2	6	4

=== Bottom half ===
==== Section 5 ====
First round
6	(Russia) N Davydenko	6	6	6
(United States) M Russell	4	1	3
(Germany) S Greul	3	4	2
(France) R Gasquet	6	6	6
(South Africa) K Anderson	6	6	6
(India) S Devvarman	3	4	3
WC	(United States) T Smyczek	3	5	6^{6}
26	(Brazil) T Bellucci	6	7	7^{8}
17	(France) G Monfils	3	6	6	6^{5}	6
Q	(United States) R Kendrick	6	3	4	7^{7}	4
(Russia) I Andreev	6	4	7^{7}	6
(Argentina) H Zeballos	3	6	6^{4}	3
(Serbia) J Tipsarević	4	7	7^{7}	6
(Belgium) O Rochus	6	5	6^{0}	2
(France) S Robert	3	2	2
9	(United States) A Roddick	6	6	6

Second round
6	(Russia) N Davydenko	3	4	2
(France) R Gasquet	6	6	6
(South Africa) K Anderson	6^{4}	6	5	6	7^{7}
26	(Brazil) T Bellucci	7^{7}	4	7	4	6^{2}
17	(France) G Monfils	6	6	6
(Russia) I Andreev	3	4	3
(Serbia) J Tipsarević	3	7	6	7^{7}
9	(United States) A Roddick	6	5	3	6^{4}

Third round
(France) R Gasquet	6	7^{7}	7
(South Africa) K Anderson	4	6^{3}	5
17	(France) G Monfils	7^{7}	6^{4}	6	6
(Serbia) J Tipsarević	6^{4}	7^{7}	2	4

Fourth round
(France) R Gasquet	4	5	5
17	(France) G Monfils	6	7	7

==== Section 6 ====
First round
16	(Cyprus) M Baghdatis	3	6	6	4	5
(France) A Clément	6	2	1	6	7
(Argentina) E Schwank	6	7^{7}	4	6
(United States) R Ginepri	4	6^{3}	6	3
(Uruguay) P Cuevas	7^{7}	6	6
Q	(Brazil) J Silva	6^{0}	1	2
(Czech Republic) J Hájek	0	6	6	0	1
19	(United States) M Fish	6	3	4	6	6
30	(Argentina) J Mónaco	2	6^{5}	3
Q	(Canada) P Polansky	6	7^{7}	6
PR	(Belgium) K Vliegen	3	2	4
WC	(United States) J Blake	6	6	6
(Germany) P Petzschner	6	6	6
Q	(Czech Republic) D Lojda	3	1	1
(Serbia) V Troicki	3	6	6	5	3
3	(Serbia) N Djokovic	6	3	2	7	6

Second round
(France) A Clément	6	5
(Argentina) E Schwank	3	5^{r}
(Uruguay) P Cuevas	5	0	2
19	(United States) M Fish	7	6	6
Q	(Canada) P Polansky	7^{7}	3	2	4
WC	(United States) J Blake	6^{1}	6	6	6
(Germany) P Petzschner	5	3	6^{6}
3	(Serbia) N Djokovic	7	6	7^{8}

Third round
(France) A Clément	6	3	4	6	3
19	(United States) M Fish	4	6	6	1	6
WC	(United States) J Blake	1	6^{4}	3
3	(Serbia) N Djokovic	6	7^{7}	6

Fourth round
19	(United States) M Fish	3	4	1
3	(Serbia) N Djokovic	6	6	6

==== Section 7 ====
First round
5	(Sweden) R Söderling	7	6	6^{2}	5	6
Q	(Austria) A Haider-Maurer	5	3	7^{7}	7	4
(United States) T Dent	6	7	6
(Colombia) A Falla	4	5	1
(Netherlands) T de Bakker	6	7	6
Q	(France) M Gicquel	4	5	2
Q	(Croatia) I Dodig	6^{2}	6	1
27	(Chile) F González	7^{7}	1	0^{r}
21	(Spain) A Montañés	5	1	7	7^{7}	6
(Poland) M Przysiężny	7	6	5	6^{5}	0
WC	(Australia) C Ball	6^{4}	6	6	6
Q	(Canada) M Raonic	7^{7}	3	3	2
Q	(Japan) K Nishikori	7^{7}	5
(Kazakhstan) E Korolev	6^{0}	2^{r}
(Ukraine) I Marchenko	5	3	1
11	(Croatia) M Čilić	7	6	6

Second round
5	(Sweden) R Söderling	6	6	6
(United States) T Dent	2	2	4
(Netherlands) T de Bakker	6^{4}	6	6	3
Q	(Croatia) I Dodig	7^{7}	2	3	2^{r}
21	(Spain) A Montañés	6	6	6
WC	(Australia) C Ball	4	3	1
Q	(Japan) K Nishikori	5	7^{8}	3	7^{7}	6
11	(Croatia) M Čilić	7	6^{6}	6	6^{3}	1

Third round
5	(Sweden) R Söderling	6	6	6
(Netherlands) T de Bakker	2	3	3
21	(Spain) A Montañés	6	2
Q	(Japan) K Nishikori	2	1^{r}

Fourth round
5	(Sweden) R Söderling	4	6	6	6
21	(Spain) A Montañés	6	3	2	3

==== Section 8 ====
First round
13	(Austria) J Melzer	6	6	3	4	6
PR	(Russia) D Tursunov	4	2	6	6	2
Q	(Lithuania) R Berankis	6	6^{5}	6	6
WC	(United States) R Sweeting	4	7^{7}	3	2
(Germany) B Phau	4	5	6	6^{4}
(Brazil) R Mello	6	7	4	7^{7}
Q	(Slovakia) M Kližan	1	3	0
22	(Spain) JC Ferrero	6	6	6
32	(Australia) L Hewitt	3	4	7	6	1
(France) P-H Mathieu	6	6	5	4	6
(Argentina) L Mayer	6	6^{4}	6^{2}	1
WC	(France) G Rufin	2	7^{7}	7^{7}	6
(Germany) M Berrer	6^{3}	3	1
(Germany) A Beck	7^{7}	6	6
(Argentina) B Dabul	1	4	2
2	(Switzerland) R Federer	6	6	6

Second round
13	(Austria) J Melzer	6	6^{4}	6	1	7
Q	(Lithuania) R Berankis	4	7^{7}	3	6	5
(Brazil) R Mello	1	4	4
22	(Spain) JC Ferrero	6	6	6
(France) P-H Mathieu	7^{7}	6	6
WC	(France) G Rufin	6^{3}	4	3
(Germany) A Beck	3	4	3
2	(Switzerland) R Federer	6	6	6

Third round
13	(Austria) J Melzer	7	6	6
22	(Spain) JC Ferrero	5	3	1
(France) P-H Mathieu	4	3	3
2	(Switzerland) R Federer	6	6	6

Fourth round
13	(Austria) J Melzer	3	6^{4}	3
2	(Switzerland) R Federer	6	7^{7}	6

== Notes ==
Preceded by 2010 Wimbledon Championships – Men's singles	Grand Slam men's singles	Succeeded by 2011 Australian Open – Men's singles
