= 2010 US Open – Women's singles =

Women's singles
- 2010 US Open

Final
- Champion: (Belgium) Kim Clijsters
- Runner-up: (Russia) Vera Zvonareva
- Score: 6–2, 6–1

Details
- Draw: 128
- Seeds: 32

Events
Singles	men	women		boys	girls
Doubles	men	women	mixed	boys	girls
WC Singles	men	women	quad
WC Doubles	men	women	quad
Legends	men	women	mixed
- US Open

Defending champion Kim Clijsters defeated Vera Zvonareva in the final, 6–2, 6–1 to win the women's singles tennis title at the 2010 US Open. It was her third US Open singles title and third major singles title overall. It was her third non-consecutive US Open title, having won on her last two appearances in 2005 and 2009 (she did not play in 2006 due to injury, and was retired from the sport in 2007 and 2008).

World No. 1 and three-time champion Serena Williams withdrew from the tournament due to a foot surgery sustained from an exhibition match. Caroline Wozniacki was in contention to gain the top ranking by winning the title, but lost to Zvonareva in the semifinals.

This marked the final major appearance of former world No. 3 and Olympic gold medalist Elena Dementieva; she was defeated in the fourth round by Samantha Stosur.

== Seeds ==
1. (Denmark) Caroline Wozniacki (semifinals)
2. (Belgium) Kim Clijsters (champion)
3. (United States) Venus Williams (semifinals)
4. (Serbia) Jelena Janković (third round)
5. (Australia) Samantha Stosur (quarterfinals)
6. (Italy) Francesca Schiavone (quarterfinals)
7. (Russia) Vera Zvonareva (final)
8. (China) Li Na (first round)
9. (Poland) Agnieszka Radwańska (second round)
10. (Belarus) Victoria Azarenka (second round, retired due to concussion)
11. (Russia) Svetlana Kuznetsova (fourth round)
12. (Russia) Elena Dementieva (fourth round)
13. (France) Marion Bartoli (second round)
14. (Russia) Maria Sharapova (fourth round)
15. (Belgium) Yanina Wickmayer (fourth round)
16. (Israel) Shahar Pe'er (fourth round)

17. (Russia) Nadia Petrova (first round)
18. (France) Aravane Rezaï (second round)
19. (Italy) Flavia Pennetta (third round)
20. (Russia) Anastasia Pavlyuchenkova (fourth round)
21. (China) Zheng Jie (second round)
22. (Spain) María José Martínez Sánchez (second round)
23. (Russia) Maria Kirilenko (third round)
24. (Slovakia) Daniela Hantuchová (third round)
25. (Romania) Alexandra Dulgheru (third round)
26. (Czech Republic) Lucie Šafářová (first round)
27. (Czech Republic) Petra Kvitová (third round)
28. (Russia) Alisa Kleybanova (second round)
29. (Ukraine) Alona Bondarenko (third round)
30. (Kazakhstan) Yaroslava Shvedova (first round)
31. (Estonia) Kaia Kanepi (quarterfinals)
32. (Bulgaria) Tsvetana Pironkova (second round)

Click on the seed number of a player to go to their draw section.

== Main draw ==
Key

- Q = Qualifier
- WC = Wild card
- LL = Lucky loser
- Alt = Alternate
- ITF = ITF entry
- PR = Protected ranking
- SR = Special ranking
- SE = Special exempt
- JE = Junior exempt
- JR = Junior Accelerator Programme entrant
- CO = College Accelerator Programme entrant
- NG = Next Gen Accelerator Program entrant
- w/o = Walkover
- r = Retired
- d = Defaulted

=== Finals ===
Quarterfinals
1	(Denmark) Caroline Wozniacki	6	7
(Slovakia) Dominika Cibulková	2	5
31	(Estonia) Kaia Kanepi	3	5
7	(Russia) Vera Zvonareva	6	7
6	(Italy) Francesca Schiavone	6^{5}	4
3	(United States) Venus Williams	7^{7}	6
5	(Australia) Samantha Stosur	4	7	3
2	(Belgium) Kim Clijsters	6	5	6

Semifinals
1	(Denmark) Caroline Wozniacki	4	3
7	(Russia) Vera Zvonareva	6	6
3	(United States) Venus Williams	6	6^{2}	4
2	(Belgium) Kim Clijsters	4	7^{7}	6

Final
7	(Russia) Vera Zvonareva	2	1
2	(Belgium) Kim Clijsters	6	6

=== Top half ===
==== Section 1 ====
First round
1	(Denmark) C Wozniacki	6	6
WC	(United States) Ch Gullickson	1	1
(Chinese Taipei) K-c Chang	6	6
(Spain) C Suárez Navarro	2	4
PR	(United Kingdom) A Keothavong	6	1	1
(Chinese Taipei) Y-j Chan	2	6	6
Q	(Austria) T Paszek	2	7	6
26	(Czech Republic) L Šafářová	6	5	2
18	(France) A Rezaï	7^{7}	7^{9}
(Slovakia) M Rybáriková	6^{5}	6^{7}
WC	(United States) B Capra	6	6
(Croatia) K Šprem	1	3
Q	(Spain) N Llagostera Vives	3	6^{6}
(Czech Republic) I Benešová	6	7^{8}
(Australia) J Groth	6	3	1
14	(Russia) M Sharapova	4	6	6

Second round
1	(Denmark) C Wozniacki	6	6
(Chinese Taipei) K-c Chang	0	0
(Chinese Taipei) Y-j Chan	6	6
Q	(Austria) T Paszek	3	3
18	(France) A Rezaï	5	6	3
WC	(United States) B Capra	7	2	6
(Czech Republic) I Benešová	1	2
14	(Russia) M Sharapova	6	6

Third round
1	(Denmark) C Wozniacki	6	6
(Chinese Taipei) Y-j Chan	1	0
WC	(United States) B Capra	0	0
14	(Russia) M Sharapova	6	6

Fourth round
1	(Denmark) C Wozniacki	6	6
14	(Russia) M Sharapova	3	4

==== Section 2 ====
First round
11	(Russia) S Kuznetsova	6	4	6
(Japan) K Date-Krumm	2	6	1
(Russia) R Kulikova	0	0^{r}
(Latvia) A Sevastova	6	2
(Austria) Y Meusburger	3	7	6
(United States) J Craybas	6	5	0
(Czech Republic) B Záhlavová-Strýcová	5	4
23	(Russia) M Kirilenko	7	6
30	(Kazakhstan) Y Shvedova	4	6	2
Q	(Spain) L Domínguez Lino	6	3	6
(Russia) A Chakvetadze	3	3
PR	(Poland) U Radwańska	6	6
(Slovakia) D Cibulková	6	4	7
(Switzerland) S Vögele	2	6	5
(Ukraine) K Bondarenko	2	6	6
8	(China) N Li	6	4	2

Second round
11	(Russia) S Kuznetsova	6	6
(Latvia) A Sevastova	2	3
(Austria) Y Meusburger	6	5	0
23	(Russia) M Kirilenko	4	7	6
Q	(Spain) L Domínguez Lino	6	7
PR	(Poland) U Radwańska	2	5
(Slovakia) D Cibulková	6	5	7^{9}
(Ukraine) K Bondarenko	2	7	6^{7}

Third round
11	(Russia) S Kuznetsova	6	6
23	(Russia) M Kirilenko	3	4
Q	(Spain) L Domínguez Lino	0	1
(Slovakia) D Cibulková	6	6

Fourth round
11	(Russia) S Kuznetsova	5	6^{4}
(Slovakia) D Cibulková	7	7^{7}

==== Section 3 ====
First round
4	(Serbia) J Janković	6	4	7
(Romania) S Halep	4	6	5
(Australia) A Molik	6^{5}	1
Q	(Croatia) M Lučić	7^{7}	6
(South Africa) C Scheepers	3	4
Q	(Uzbekistan) A Amanmuradova	6	6
(France) A Cornet	6	1	0
31	(Estonia) K Kanepi	3	6	6
22	(Spain) MJ Martínez Sánchez	6	3	6
WC	(United States) J Hampton	4	6	0
(Belgium) K Flipkens	1	3
(Switzerland) P Schnyder	6	6
(Italy) R Oprandi	3	4
(Germany) J Görges	6	6
(Russia) A Kudryavtseva	1	2
15	(Belgium) Y Wickmayer	6	6

Second round
4	(Serbia) J Janković	6	3	6
Q	(Croatia) M Lučić	4	6	2
Q	(Uzbekistan) A Amanmuradova	2	4
31	(Estonia) K Kanepi	6	6
22	(Spain) MJ Martínez Sánchez	6^{2}	4
(Switzerland) P Schnyder	7^{7}	6
(Germany) J Görges	4	5
15	(Belgium) Y Wickmayer	6	7

Third round
4	(Serbia) J Janković	2	6^{1}
31	(Estonia) K Kanepi	6	7^{7}
(Switzerland) P Schnyder	6^{5}	6	6^{6}
15	(Belgium) Y Wickmayer	7^{7}	3	7^{8}

Fourth round
31	(Estonia) K Kanepi	0	7^{7}	6
15	(Belgium) Y Wickmayer	6	6^{2}	1

==== Section 4 ====
First round
9	(Poland) A Radwańska	6	6
(Spain) A Parra Santonja	4	3
(China) S Peng	6^{5}	7^{7}	6
WC	(United States) S Rogers	7^{7}	6^{3}	3
(United States) B Mattek-Sands	4	6	6
(Spain) A Medina Garrigues	6	4	1
(Germany) A Petkovic	6	4	7^{7}
17	(Russia) N Petrova	2	6	6^{4}
25	(Romania) A Dulgheru	6	6
(France) J Coin	3	1
(Sweden) S Arvidsson	6	6
(Romania) S Cîrstea	1	2
WC	(United States) C Vandeweghe	1	0
(Germany) S Lisicki	6	6
Q	(Slovakia) Z Kučová	2	1
7	(Russia) V Zvonareva	6	6

Second round
9	(Poland) A Radwańska	6	1	4
(China) S Peng	2	6	6
(United States) B Mattek-Sands	6	3	5
(Germany) A Petkovic	3	6	7
25	(Romania) A Dulgheru	7^{7}	6
(Sweden) S Arvidsson	6^{5}	1
(Germany) S Lisicki	1	6^{5}
7	(Russia) V Zvonareva	6	7^{7}

Third round
(China) S Peng
(Germany) A Petkovic	w/o
25	(Romania) A Dulgheru	2	6^{2}
7	(Russia) V Zvonareva	6	7^{7}

Fourth round
(Germany) A Petkovic	1	2
7	(Russia) V Zvonareva	6	6

=== Bottom half ===
==== Section 5 ====
First round
6	(Italy) F Schiavone	6	6
(Japan) A Morita	1	0
Q	(Italy) ME Camerin	6	6
WC	(Australia) S Ferguson	4	0
(United States) M Oudin	6	6
Q	(Ukraine) O Savchuk	3	0
(Russia) V Dushevina	0	7	4
29	(Ukraine) A Bondarenko	6	5	6
20	(Russia) A Pavlyuchenkova	6	6
(Germany) K Barrois	4	1
Q	(Portugal) M Larcher de Brito	3	2
Q	(India) S Mirza	6	6
(Argentina) G Dulko	6	6
(Germany) A Kerber	3	1
Q	(Romania) M Niculescu	0	7	1
10	(Belarus) V Azarenka	6	5	6

Second round
6	(Italy) F Schiavone	6	6
Q	(Italy) ME Camerin	2	1
(United States) M Oudin	2	5
29	(Ukraine) A Bondarenko	6	7
20	(Russia) A Pavlyuchenkova	6	6
Q	(India) S Mirza	2	4
(Argentina) G Dulko	5
10	(Belarus) V Azarenka	1^{r}

Third round
6	(Italy) F Schiavone	6	7
29	(Ukraine) A Bondarenko	1	5
20	(Russia) A Pavlyuchenkova	6	6
(Argentina) G Dulko	1	2

Fourth round
6	(Italy) F Schiavone	6	6
20	(Russia) A Pavlyuchenkova	3	0

==== Section 6 ====
First round
16	(Israel) S Pe'er	6	7
PR	(Croatia) J Kostanić Tošić	4	5
(France) P Parmentier	4	6	7
(Italy) A Brianti	6	3	5
(Hungary) Á Szávay	6	6
(Czech Republic) S Záhlavová	0	2
Q	(United States) I Falconi	2	1
19	(Italy) F Pennetta	6	6
32	(Bulgaria) T Pironkova	6	6
(Czech Republic) R Voráčová	3	4
(Slovenia) P Hercog	4	5
Q	(Luxembourg) M Minella	6	7
Q	(Canada) R Marino	6	4	7
(Russia) K Pervak	4	6	5
(Italy) R Vinci	4	1
3	(United States) V Williams	6	6

Second round
16	(Israel) S Pe'er	6	6
(France) P Parmentier	2	3
(Hungary) Á Szávay	1	4
19	(Italy) F Pennetta	6	6
32	(Bulgaria) T Pironkova	4	0
Q	(Luxembourg) M Minella	6	6
Q	(Canada) R Marino	6^{3}	3
3	(United States) V Williams	7^{7}	6

Third round
16	(Israel) S Pe'er	6	6
19	(Italy) F Pennetta	4	4
Q	(Luxembourg) M Minella	2	1
3	(United States) V Williams	6	6

Fourth round
16	(Israel) S Pe'er	6^{3}	3
3	(United States) V Williams	7^{7}	6

==== Section 7 ====
First round
5	(Australia) S Stosur	3	7^{7}	6
(Russia) E Vesnina	6	6^{2}	1
(Serbia) B Jovanovski	5	4
(Australia) An Rodionova	7	6
(Italy) S Errani	7^{7}	7
(Italy) T Garbin	6^{4}	5
(Sweden) J Larsson	6^{4}	2
28	(Russia) A Kleybanova	7^{7}	6
24	(Slovakia) D Hantuchová	6	6
(Russia) D Safina	3	4
(United States) V King	6	0	6
WC	(United States) C McHale	3	6	1
Q	(Czech Republic) Z Ondrášková	5	0
(Austria) S Bammer	7	6
(Belarus) O Govortsova	1	2
12	(Russia) E Dementieva	6	6

Second round
5	(Australia) S Stosur	6	6
(Australia) An Rodionova	1	4
(Italy) S Errani	6	6
28	(Russia) A Kleybanova	2	3
24	(Slovakia) D Hantuchová	5	6	6
(United States) V King	7	3	4
(Austria) S Bammer	3	4
12	(Russia) E Dementieva	6	6

Third round
5	(Australia) S Stosur	6	6
(Italy) S Errani	2	3
24	(Slovakia) D Hantuchová	5	2
12	(Russia) E Dementieva	7	6

Fourth round
5	(Australia) S Stosur	6	2	7^{7}
12	(Russia) E Dementieva	3	6	6^{2}

==== Section 8 ====
First round
13	(France) M Bartoli	6	6
(Romania) E Gallovits	3	2
WC	(France) V Razzano	6	6
(Czech Republic) K Zakopalová	3	2
(Serbia) A Ivanovic	6	6
(Russia) E Makarova	3	2
(Switzerland) T Bacsinszky	6^{0}	6^{1}
21	(China) J Zheng	7^{7}	7^{7}
27	(Czech Republic) P Kvitová	6	7
(Czech Republic) L Hradecká	4	5
(United Kingdom) E Baltacha	6	6
(Croatia) P Martić	2	2
Q	(Australia) S Peers	6	6
(Canada) A Wozniak	0	1
(Hungary) G Arn	0	5
2	(Belgium) K Clijsters	6	7

Second round
13	(France) M Bartoli	5	4
WC	(France) V Razzano	7	6
(Serbia) A Ivanovic	6	6
21	(China) J Zheng	3	0
27	(Czech Republic) P Kvitová	7^{7}	6
(United Kingdom) E Baltacha	6^{5}	3
Q	(Australia) S Peers	2	1
2	(Belgium) K Clijsters	6	6

Third round
WC	(France) V Razzano	5	0
(Serbia) A Ivanovic	7	6
27	(Czech Republic) P Kvitová	3	0
2	(Belgium) K Clijsters	6	6

Fourth round
(Serbia) A Ivanovic	2	1
2	(Belgium) K Clijsters	6	6

== Championship match statistics ==
Category	(Belgium) Clijsters	(Russia) Zvonareva
1st serve %	37/48 (77%)	27/41 (66%)
1st serve points won	29 of 37 = 78%	13 of 27 = 48%
2nd serve points won	6 of 11 = 55%	5 of 14 = 36%
Total service points won	35 of 48 = 72.92%	18 of 41 = 43.90%
Aces	1	1
Double faults	2	4
Winners	17	6
Unforced errors	15	24
Net points won	10 of 12 = 83%	4 of 9 = 44%
Break points converted	4 of 5 = 80%	0 of 2 = 0%
Return points won	23 of 41 = 56%	13 of 48 = 27%
Total points won	58	31

Preceded by 2010 Wimbledon Championships – Women's singles	Grand Slam women's singles	Succeeded by 2011 Australian Open – Women's singles
