= 2010 US Open – Women's doubles =

Women's doubles
- 2010 US Open

Final
- Champion: (United States) Vania King (Kazakhstan) Yaroslava Shvedova
- Runner-up: (United States) Liezel Huber (Russia) Nadia Petrova
- Score: 2–6, 6–4, 7–6^{(7–4)}

Details
- Draw: 64 (7 WC )
- Seeds: 16

Events
| Singles | men | women | | boys | girls |
| Doubles | men | women | mixed | boys | girls |
| WC Singles | men | women | quad |
| WC Doubles | men | women | quad |
| Legends | men | women | mixed |
| ← 2009 · | US Open | · 2011 → |

Serena Williams and Venus Williams were the defending champions. However, Serena withdrew from the tournament because of a foot injury and Venus chose to participate in the singles event only. Vania King and Yaroslava Shvedova defeated Liezel Huber and Nadia Petrova 2–6, 6–4, 7–6^{(7–4)} in the final. This match was played over two days due to heavy rainfall on September 12.

== Seeds ==
1. (Argentina) Gisela Dulko / (Italy) Flavia Pennetta (quarterfinals)
2. (United States) Liezel Huber / (Russia) Nadia Petrova (final)
3. (Spain) Nuria Llagostera Vives / (Spain) María José Martínez Sánchez (first round)
4. (Czech Republic) Květa Peschke / (Slovenia) Katarina Srebotnik (third round)
5. (United States) Lisa Raymond / (Australia) Rennae Stubbs (quarterfinals)
6. (United States) Vania King / (Kazakhstan) Yaroslava Shvedova (champions)
7. (Chinese Taipei) Chan Yung-jan / (China) Zheng Jie (semifinals)
8. (Spain) Anabel Medina Garrigues / (China) Yan Zi (second round)
9. (Zimbabwe) Cara Black / (Australia) Anastasia Rodionova (semifinals)
10. (Russia) Maria Kirilenko / (Poland) Agnieszka Radwańska (third round)
11. (Russia) Alisa Kleybanova / (Russia) Ekaterina Makarova (second round)
12. (Czech Republic) Iveta Benešová / (Czech Republic) Barbora Záhlavová-Strýcová (third round)
13. (Romania) Monica Niculescu / (Israel) Shahar Pe'er (third round)
14. (Russia) Elena Vesnina / (Russia) Vera Zvonareva (quarterfinals)
15. (United States) Bethanie Mattek-Sands / (United States) Meghann Shaughnessy (quarterfinals)
16. (Chinese Taipei) Hsieh Su-wei / (China) Peng Shuai (second round)

== Draw ==
=== Key ===
- Q = Qualifier
- WC = Wild card
- LL = Lucky loser
- Alt = Alternate
- ITF = ITF entry
- PR = Protected ranking
- SR = Special ranking
- SE = Special exempt
- JE = Junior exempt
- JR = Junior Accelerator Programme entrant
- CO = College Accelerator Programme entrant
- NG = Next Gen Accelerator Program entrant
- w/o = Walkover
- r = Retired
- d = Defaulted

=== Finals ===
Quarterfinals
1 | (Argentina) Gisela Dulko (Italy) Flavia Pennetta | 3 | 3
6 | (United States) Vania King (Kazakhstan) Yaroslava Shvedova | 6 | 6
14 | (Russia) Elena Vesnina (Russia) Vera Zvonareva | 6 | 5 | 4
9 | (Zimbabwe) Cara Black (Australia) Anastasia Rodionova | 4 | 7 | 6
7 | (Chinese Taipei) Chan Yung-jan (China) Zheng Jie | 6 | 6
15 | (United States) Bethanie Mattek-Sands (United States) Meghann Shaughnessy | 4 | 4
5 | (United States) Lisa Raymond (Australia) Rennae Stubbs | 4 | 6 | 5
2 | (United States) Liezel Huber (Russia) Nadia Petrova | 6 | 3 | 7

Semifinals
6 | (United States) Vania King (Kazakhstan) Yaroslava Shvedova | 6 | 4 | 6
9 | (Zimbabwe) Cara Black (Australia) Anastasia Rodionova | 3 | 6 | 4
7 | (Chinese Taipei) Chan Yung-jan (China) Zheng Jie | 3 | 2
2 | (United States) Liezel Huber (Russia) Nadia Petrova | 6 | 6

Final
6 | (United States) Vania King (Kazakhstan) Yaroslava Shvedova | 2 | 6 | 7
2 | (United States) Liezel Huber (Russia) Nadia Petrova | 6 | 4 | 6^{4}

=== Top half ===
==== Section 1 ====
First round
1 | (Argentina) G Dulko (Italy) F Pennetta | 4 | 6 | 6
(Spain) A Parra Santonja (Czech Republic) R Voráčová | 6 | 1 | 2
(Belgium) K Flipkens (Germany) J Wöhr | 7 | 0 | 3
(Romania) S Cîrstea (Czech Republic) L Šafářová | 6^{4} | 6 | 6
(Germany) T Malek (Germany) A Petkovic | 5 | 7 | 4
WC | (United States) A Glatch (United States) C Vandeweghe | 7 | 6^{6} | 6
(Netherlands) M Krajicek (Canada) M-È Pelletier | 6^{4} | 4
13 | (Romania) M Niculescu (Israel) S Pe'er | 7 | 6
12 | (Czech Republic) I Benešová (Czech Republic) B Záhlavová-Strýcová | 6 | 6
(Uzbekistan) A Amanmuradova (Germany) K Barrois | 0 | 4
(Serbia) J Janković (Serbia) B Jovanovski | 6 | 3 | 4
(Japan) K Date-Krumm (Japan) A Morita | 4 | 6 | 6
(Latvia) L Dekmeijere (Germany) A Kerber | 1 | 6 | 2
(Australia) J Groth (Czech Republic) K Zakopalová | 6 | 4 | 6
(Croatia) J Kostanić Tošić (Italy) R Oprandi | 3 | 0
6 | (United States) V King (Kazakhstan) Y Shvedova | 6 | 6

Second round
1 | (Argentina) G Dulko (Italy) F Pennetta | 6 | 6
(Romania) S Cîrstea (Czech Republic) L Šafářová | 0 | 4
WC | (United States) A Glatch (United States) C Vandeweghe | 7 | 3 | 6^{4}
13 | (Romania) M Niculescu (Israel) S Pe'er | 6^{6} | 6 | 7
12 | (Czech Republic) I Benešová (Czech Republic) B Záhlavová-Strýcová | 6 | 6^{1} | 6
(Japan) K Date-Krumm (Japan) A Morita | 4 | 7 | 1
(Australia) J Groth (Czech Republic) K Zakopalová | 5 | 6 | 2
6 | (United States) V King (Kazakhstan) Y Shvedova | 7 | 4 | 6

Third round
1 | (Argentina) G Dulko (Italy) F Pennetta | 6^{7} | 6 | 6
13 | (Romania) M Niculescu (Israel) S Pe'er | 7 | 1 | 2
12 | (Czech Republic) I Benešová (Czech Republic) B Záhlavová-Strýcová | 6^{9} | 6 | 6^{9}
6 | (United States) V King (Kazakhstan) Y Shvedova | 7 | 3 | 7

Quarterfinals
1 | (Argentina) G Dulko (Italy) F Pennetta | 3 | 3
6 | (United States) V King (Kazakhstan) Y Shvedova | 6 | 6

==== Section 2 ====
First round
3 | (Spain) N Llagostera Vives (Spain) MJ Martínez Sánchez | 4 | 6 | 6^{4}
(Romania) A Dulgheru (Slovakia) M Rybáriková | 6 | 4 | 7
(Romania) E Gallovits (Poland) K Jans | 5 | 6 | 6
(South Africa) N Grandin (United States) A Spears | 7 | 3 | 1
(Sweden) S Arvidsson (Sweden) J Larsson | 1 | 6 | 4
Alt | (Russia) V Diatchenko (Turkey) İ Şenoğlu | 6 | 2 | 6
WC | (United States) H Barte (United States) L Burdette | 5 | 3
14 | (Russia) E Vesnina (Russia) V Zvonareva | 7 | 6
9 | (Zimbabwe) C Black (Australia) An Rodionova | 6 | 6
Alt | (Italy) A Brianti (Poland) U Radwańska | 2 | 3
(Russia) Ar Rodionova (Ukraine) O Savchuk | 7 | 4 | 3
(Russia) A Kudryavtseva (Belarus) D Kustova | 5 | 6 | 6
(Germany) J Görges (Germany) A-L Grönefeld | 6 | 7
(Poland) A Rosolska (South Africa) C Scheepers | 3 | 6^{3}
(Switzerland) P Schnyder (Hungary) Á Szávay | 1 | 4
8 | (Spain) A Medina Garrigues (China) Z Yan | 6 | 6

Second round
(Romania) A Dulgheru (Slovakia) M Rybáriková | 6 | 6
(Romania) E Gallovits (Poland) K Jans | 2 | 3
Alt | (Russia) V Diatchenko (Turkey) İ Şenoğlu | 1 | 1
14 | (Russia) E Vesnina (Russia) V Zvonareva | 6 | 6
9 | (Zimbabwe) C Black (Australia) An Rodionova | 6 | 6
(Russia) A Kudryavtseva (Belarus) D Kustova | 4 | 1
(Germany) J Görges (Germany) A-L Grönefeld | 7 | 6
8 | (Spain) A Medina Garrigues (China) Z Yan | 5 | 2

Third round
(Romania) A Dulgheru (Slovakia) M Rybáriková | 5 | 3
14 | (Russia) E Vesnina (Russia) V Zvonareva | 7 | 6
9 | (Zimbabwe) C Black (Australia) An Rodionova | 2 | 6 | 6
(Germany) J Görges (Germany) A-L Grönefeld | 6 | 4 | 2

Quarterfinals
14 | (Russia) E Vesnina (Russia) V Zvonareva | 6 | 5 | 4
9 | (Zimbabwe) C Black (Australia) An Rodionova | 4 | 7 | 6

=== Bottom half ===
==== Section 3 ====
First round
7 | (Chinese Taipei) Y-j Chan (China) J Zheng | 6 | 6
(Greece) E Daniilidou (Bulgaria) T Pironkova | 2 | 3
WC | (United States) L Herring (United States) G Min | 1 | 4
(Slovakia) D Cibulková (Russia) A Pavlyuchenkova | 6 | 6
(Australia) A Molik (Italy) F Schiavone | 6^{4} | 3
(Slovenia) P Hercog (Croatia) P Martić | 7 | 6
(Russia) V Dushevina (India) S Mirza | 7 | 2 | 6^{3}
11 | (Russia) A Kleybanova (Russia) E Makarova | 6^{6} | 6 | 7
15 | (United States) B Mattek-Sands (United States) M Shaughnessy | 6 | 6
WC | (United States) C McHale (United States) R Zalameda | 0 | 3
(Slovakia) D Hantuchová (Denmark) C Wozniacki | 6 | 6
(Czech Republic) A Hlaváčková (Czech Republic) L Hradecká | 0 | 2
(Italy) S Errani (Italy) R Vinci | 2 | 3
WC | (United States) Ca Gullickson (United States) Ch Gullickson | 6 | 6
(Czech Republic) P Kvitová (Switzerland) S Vögele | 1 | 2
4 | (Czech Republic) K Peschke (Slovenia) K Srebotnik | 6 | 6

Second round
7 | (Chinese Taipei) Y-j Chan (China) J Zheng | 6 | 6
(Slovakia) D Cibulková (Russia) A Pavlyuchenkova | 2 | 3
(Slovenia) P Hercog (Croatia) P Martić | 6 | 6^{1} | 6
11 | (Russia) A Kleybanova (Russia) E Makarova | 3 | 7 | 3
15 | (United States) B Mattek-Sands (United States) M Shaughnessy | 7 | 6
(Slovakia) D Hantuchová (Denmark) C Wozniacki | 6^{3} | 4
WC | (United States) Ca Gullickson (United States) Ch Gullickson | 2 | 3
4 | (Czech Republic) K Peschke (Slovenia) K Srebotnik | 6 | 6

Third round
7 | (Chinese Taipei) Y-j Chan (China) J Zheng | 6 | 6
(Slovenia) P Hercog (Croatia) P Martić | 2 | 3
15 | (United States) B Mattek-Sands (United States) M Shaughnessy | 6 | 6
4 | (Czech Republic) K Peschke (Slovenia) K Srebotnik | 4 | 1

Quarterfinals
7 | (Chinese Taipei) Y-j Chan (China) J Zheng | 6 | 6
15 | (United States) B Mattek-Sands (United States) M Shaughnessy | 4 | 4

==== Section 4 ====
First round
5 | (United States) L Raymond (Australia) R Stubbs | 6 | 6
(Russia) M Kondratieva (Czech Republic) V Uhlířová | 1 | 2
(Chinese Taipei) C-j Chuang (Belarus) O Govortsova | 6 | 6
(Croatia) D Jurak (Estonia) K Kanepi | 1 | 1
WC | (United States) J Hampton (United States) M Oudin | 7 | 6
WC | (United States) J Craybas (United States) S Stephens | 5 | 0
(Chinese Taipei) K-c Chang (United States) R Kops-Jones | 3 | 0
10 | (Russia) M Kirilenko (Poland) A Radwańska | 6 | 6
16 | (Chinese Taipei) S-w Hsieh (China) S Peng | 6 | 6
(Belarus) E Dzehalevich (Belarus) T Poutchek | 3 | 3
(United Kingdom) A Keothavong (Latvia) A Sevastova | 6 | 3 | 2
(Switzerland) T Bacsinszky (Italy) T Garbin | 1 | 6 | 6
(France) A Rezaï (Belgium) Y Wickmayer | 4 | 1
(Ukraine) A Bondarenko (Ukraine) K Bondarenko | 6 | 6
(France) J Coin (France) A Cornet | 2 | 3
2 | (United States) L Huber (Russia) N Petrova | 6 | 6

Second round
5 | (United States) L Raymond (Australia) R Stubbs | 6 | 6
(Chinese Taipei) C-j Chuang (Belarus) O Govortsova | 2 | 3
WC | (United States) J Hampton (United States) M Oudin | 2 | 1
10 | (Russia) M Kirilenko (Poland) A Radwańska | 6 | 6
16 | (Chinese Taipei) S-w Hsieh (China) S Peng | 6 | 3 | 6^{6}
(Switzerland) T Bacsinszky (Italy) T Garbin | 3 | 6 | 7
(Ukraine) A Bondarenko (Ukraine) K Bondarenko | 3 | 2
2 | (United States) L Huber (Russia) N Petrova | 6 | 6

Third round
5 | (United States) L Raymond (Australia) R Stubbs | 6 | 7
10 | (Russia) M Kirilenko (Poland) A Radwańska | 4 | 6^{1}
(Switzerland) T Bacsinszky (Italy) T Garbin | 3 | 3
2 | (United States) L Huber (Russia) N Petrova | 6 | 6

Quarterfinals
5 | (United States) L Raymond (Australia) R Stubbs | 4 | 6 | 5
2 | (United States) L Huber (Russia) N Petrova | 6 | 3 | 7
