= Ester Goldfeld =

American tennis player (born 1993)

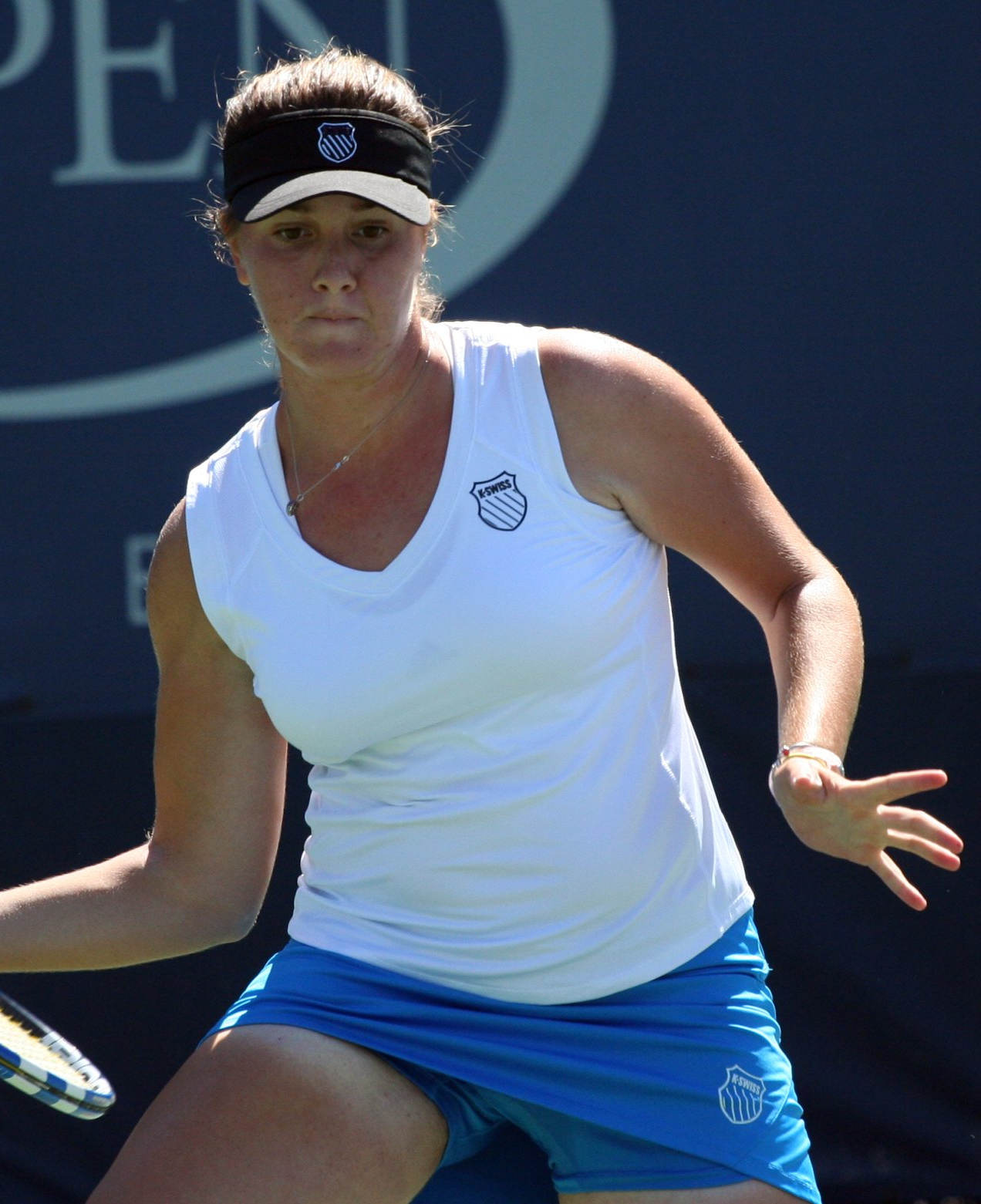
- Ester Goldfeld in action during the 2010 US Open girls' singles event.
- Full name: Ester Iris Goldfeld
- Country (sports): United States
- Residence: New York City, New York, United States
- Born: July 4, 1993 (age 32) New York City, New York, United States
- Plays: Right-handed (two-handed backhand)
- Prize money: $12,463

Singles
- Career record: 35-34
- Career titles: 0
- Highest ranking: No. 438 (June 7, 2010)

Doubles
- Career record: 8-3
- Career titles: 1 ITF
- Highest ranking: No. 794 (June 21, 2010)
- Last updated on: October 10, 2013.

Ester Iris Goldfeld (born July 4, 1993) is a junior American tennis player. Her highest WTA singles ranking is 438, which she reached on June 7, 2010. Her career high in doubles is 794, achieved on June 21, 2010.

== ITF Circuit finals ==
=== Singles finals (1) ===
$100,000 tournaments
$75,000 tournaments
$50,000 tournaments
$25,000 tournaments
$10,000 tournaments

Result	No.	Date	Location	Surface	Opponent	Score
Loss	1.	June 21, 2009	Brownsville, United States	Hard	(New Zealand) Sacha Jones	3–6, 2–6

=== Doubles finals 2 (1–1) ===
$100,000 tournaments
$75,000 tournaments
$50,000 tournaments
$25,000 tournaments
$10,000 tournaments

Result	No.	Date	Location	Surface	Partnering	Opponent	Score
Loss	1.	June 21, 2009	Brownsville, United States	Hard	(United States) Macall Harkins	(New Zealand) Sacha Jones (United States) Ashley Weinhold	3–6, 3–6
Win	2.	June 27, 2009	Wichita, United States	Hard	(United States) Macall Harkins	(United States) Sabrina Capannolo (United States) Elizabeth Lumpkin	7–6^{(7–5)}, 6–4
