= 2010 US Open – Mixed doubles =

Mixed doubles
- 2010 US Open

Final
- Champion: (United States) Liezel Huber (United States) Bob Bryan
- Runner-up: (Czech Republic) Květa Peschke (Pakistan) Aisam-ul-Haq Qureshi
- Score: 6–4, 6–4

Details
- Draw: 32
- Seeds: 8

Events
Singles	men	women		boys	girls
Doubles	men	women	mixed	boys	girls
WC Singles	men	women	quad
WC Doubles	men	women	quad
Legends	men	women	mixed
- US Open

Liezel Huber and Bob Bryan defeated Květa Peschke and Aisam-ul-Haq Qureshi in the final, 6–4, 6–4 to win the mixed doubles tennis title at the 2010 US Open.

Carly Gullickson and Travis Parrott were the defending champions, but lost in the first round to Gisela Dulko and Pablo Cuevas.

== Seeds ==
1. (United States) Liezel Huber / (United States) Bob Bryan (champions)
2. (Zimbabwe) Cara Black / (India) Leander Paes (quarterfinals)
3. (Slovenia) Katarina Srebotnik / (Serbia) Nenad Zimonjić (second round)
4. (United States) Bethanie Mattek-Sands / (Canada) Daniel Nestor (semifinals)
5. (Australia) Rennae Stubbs / (Belgium) Dick Norman (first round)
6. (Russia) Elena Vesnina / (Israel) Andy Ram (second round)
7. (United States) Lisa Raymond / (South Africa) Wesley Moodie (quarterfinals)
8. (United States) Vania King / (Romania) Horia Tecău (first round)

== Draw ==
Key

- Q = Qualifier
- WC = Wild card
- LL = Lucky loser
- Alt = Alternate
- ITF = ITF entry
- PR = Protected ranking
- SR = Special ranking
- SE = Special exempt
- JE = Junior exempt
- JR = Junior Accelerator Programme entrant
- CO = College Accelerator Programme entrant
- NG = Next Gen Accelerator Program entrant
- w/o = Walkover
- r = Retired
- d = Defaulted

=== Finals ===
Semifinals
1	(United States) Liezel Huber (United States) Bob Bryan	6	7
4	(United States) Bethanie Mattek-Sands (Canada) Daniel Nestor	3	5
(Czech Republic) Květa Peschke (Pakistan) Aisam-ul-Haq Qureshi	7	7
(Germany) Anna-Lena Grönefeld (The Bahamas) Mark Knowles	6^{5}	6^{4}

Final
1	(United States) Liezel Huber (United States) Bob Bryan	6	6
(Czech Republic) Květa Peschke (Pakistan) Aisam-ul-Haq Qureshi	4	4

=== Top half ===
First round
1	(United States) L Huber (United States) B Bryan	6	6
Alt	(Chinese Taipei) S-w Hsieh (Brazil) B Soares	4	3
WC	(United States) M Oudin (United States) R Harrison	6	7
(Czech Republic) A Hlaváčková (Slovakia) M Mertiňák	1	5
(Switzerland) T Bacsinszky (Austria) O Marach	1	3
(Belarus) O Govortsova (Poland) M Matkowski	6	6
(Spain) A Medina Garrigues (Spain) M López	1	6^{4}
7	(United States) L Raymond (South Africa) W Moodie	6	7
4	(United States) B Mattek-Sands (Canada) D Nestor	6	2	[10]
WC	(United States) B Capra (United States) J Sock	2	6	[7]
(China) Z Yan (India) R Bopanna	2	4
(France) A Rezaï (United States) R Ram	6	6
(Chinese Taipei) Y-j Chan (Australia) P Hanley	6	6
Alt	(Romania) A Dulgheru (Spain) D Marrero	4	2
WC	(United States) A Spears (United States) S Lipsky	7	7
5	(Australia) R Stubbs (Belgium) D Norman	6^{4}	6^{3}

Second round
1	(United States) L Huber (United States) B Bryan	5	6	[10]
WC	(United States) M Oudin (United States) R Harrison	7	1	[3]
(Belarus) O Govortsova (Poland) M Matkowski	4	6^{5}
7	(United States) L Raymond (South Africa) W Moodie	6	7
4	(United States) B Mattek-Sands (Canada) D Nestor	6^{2}	6	[10]
(France) A Rezaï (United States) R Ram	7	2	[5]
(Chinese Taipei) Y-j Chan (Australia) P Hanley	6	5	[10]
WC	(United States) A Spears (United States) S Lipsky	2	7	[5]

Quarterfinals
1	(United States) L Huber (United States) B Bryan	6	7
7	(United States) L Raymond (South Africa) W Moodie	4	6^{3}
4	(United States) B Mattek-Sands (Canada) D Nestor	6	6
(Chinese Taipei) Y-j Chan (Australia) P Hanley	4	3

Semifinals
1	(United States) L Huber (United States) B Bryan	6	7
4	(United States) B Mattek-Sands (Canada) D Nestor	3	5

=== Bottom half ===
First round
8	(United States) V King (Romania) H Tecău	5	6	[5]
(Czech Republic) K Peschke (Pakistan) A-u-H Qureshi	7	4	[10]
WC	(United States) J Craybas (United States) M Russell	6^{3}	7	[1]
(Kazakhstan) Y Shvedova (Austria) J Knowle	7	5	[10]
WC	(United States) C Gullickson (United States) T Parrott	2	4
(Argentina) G Dulko (Uruguay) P Cuevas	6	6
(Germany) A Petkovic (Poland) M Fyrstenberg	6^{3}	6^{2}
3	(Slovenia) K Srebotnik (Serbia) N Zimonjić	7	7
6	(Russia) E Vesnina (Israel) A Ram	6	6^{6}	[11]
WC	(United States) R Kops-Jones (United States) E Butorac	4	7	[9]
(Germany) A-L Grönefeld (The Bahamas) M Knowles	6	6
WC	(United States) N Gibbs (United States) S Querrey	3	2
(Slovakia) D Hantuchová (India) M Bhupathi	4	2
(Estonia) K Kanepi (Sweden) R Lindstedt	6	6
(Czech Republic) L Hradecká (Czech Republic) F Čermák	4	5
2	(Zimbabwe) C Black (India) L Paes	6	7

Second round
(Czech Republic) K Peschke (Pakistan) A-u-H Qureshi	5	6	[10]
(Kazakhstan) Y Shvedova (Austria) J Knowle	7	3	[4]
(Argentina) G Dulko (Uruguay) P Cuevas	7	7
3	(Slovenia) K Srebotnik (Serbia) N Zimonjić	5	5
6	(Russia) E Vesnina (Israel) A Ram	6	3	[7]
(Germany) A-L Grönefeld (The Bahamas) M Knowles	4	6	[10]
(Estonia) K Kanepi (Sweden) R Lindstedt	4	1
2	(Zimbabwe) C Black (India) L Paes	6	6

Quarterfinals
(Czech Republic) K Peschke (Pakistan) A-u-H Qureshi	3	6	[10]
(Argentina) G Dulko (Uruguay) P Cuevas	6	2	[4]
(Germany) A-L Grönefeld (The Bahamas) M Knowles	6	6
2	(Zimbabwe) C Black (India) L Paes	3	4

Semifinals
(Czech Republic) K Peschke (Pakistan) A-u-H Qureshi	7	7
(Germany) A-L Grönefeld (The Bahamas) M Knowles	6^{5}	6^{4}
