= 2010 US Open – Boys' doubles =

Boys' doubles
- 2010 US Open

Final
- Champion: (Peru) Duilio Beretta (Ecuador) Roberto Quiroz
- Runner-up: (United Kingdom) Oliver Golding (Czech Republic) Jiří Veselý
- Score: 6–1, 7–5

Events
Singles	men	women		boys	girls
Doubles	men	women	mixed	boys	girls
WC Singles	men	women	quad
WC Doubles	men	women	quad
Legends	men	women	mixed
- US Open

Márton Fucsovics and Hsieh Cheng-peng were the defending champions, but Hsieh did not enter the junior competition this year.
Fucsovics played alongside Máté Zsiga, but they lost to Guilherme Clézar and Tiago Fernandes in the second round.
Duilio Beretta and Roberto Quiroz won their second Grand Slam Boys' Doubles title in the year after winning at the French Open. They defeated Oliver Golding and Jiří Veselý 6–1, 7–5 in the final.

== Seeds ==
1. (Hungary) Márton Fucsovics / (Hungary) Máté Zsiga (second round)
2. (Argentina) Renzo Olivo / (Argentina) Agustín Velotti (first round)
3. (Peru) Duilio Beretta / (Ecuador) Roberto Quiroz (champions)
4. (United Kingdom) Oliver Golding / (Czech Republic) Jiří Veselý (final)
5. (Colombia) Juan Sebastián Gómez / (Japan) Yasutaka Uchiyama (first round)
6. (Bosnia and Herzegovina) Damir Džumhur / (Croatia) Mate Pavić (quarterfinals)
7. (United States) Denis Kudla / (United States) Raymond Sarmiento (first round)
8. (Chinese Taipei) Huang Liang-chi / (China) Ouyang Bowen (second round)

== Draw ==
Key

- Q = Qualifier
- WC = Wild card
- LL = Lucky loser
- Alt = Alternate
- ITF = ITF entry
- PR = Protected ranking
- SR = Special ranking
- SE = Special exempt
- JE = Junior exempt
- JR = Junior Accelerator Programme entrant
- CO = College Accelerator Programme entrant
- NG = Next Gen Accelerator Program entrant
- w/o = Walkover
- r = Retired
- d = Defaulted

=== Finals ===
Semifinals
(Brazil) Guilherme Clézar (Brazil) Tiago Fernandes	0	3
3	(Peru) Duilio Beretta (Ecuador) Roberto Quiroz	6	6
4	(United Kingdom) Oliver Golding (Czech Republic) Jiří Veselý	7	6^{6}	[10]
(Russia) Victor Baluda (Russia) Alexander Rumyantsev	6^{6}	7	[6]

Final
3	(Peru) Duilio Beretta (Ecuador) Roberto Quiroz	6	7
4	(United Kingdom) Oliver Golding (Czech Republic) Jiří Veselý	1	5

=== Top half ===
First round
1	(Hungary) Márton Fucsovics (Hungary) Máté Zsiga	6	6
WC	(United States) Max Lipman (United States) Mackenzie McDonald	3	3
(Brazil) Guilherme Clézar (Brazil) Tiago Fernandes	7	6
(Slovakia) Filip Horanský (Slovakia) Jozef Kovalík	6^{1}	4
(Bolivia) Hugo Dellien (Venezuela) Ricardo Rodríguez	6	6
(Barbados) Darian King (United States) Junior A. Ore	2	2
(United States) Bjorn Fratangelo (United States) Alexios Halebian	4	7	[8]
6	(Bosnia and Herzegovina) Damir Džumhur (Croatia) Mate Pavić	6	6^{7}	[10]
3	(Peru) Duilio Beretta (Ecuador) Roberto Quiroz	6	6
(Philippines) Jeson Patrombon (United States) Michael Zhu	4	3
(Czech Republic) Libor Salaba (China) Wang Chuhan	4	4
(United States) Mitchell Krueger (United States) Dane Webb	6	6
WC	(United States) Nick Chappell (United States) Michael Redlicki	4	2
(Germany) Peter Heller (Germany) Kevin Krawietz	6	6
(Croatia) Mate Delić (Czech Republic) Lukáš Vrňák	6^{1}	7	[9]
8	(Chinese Taipei) Huang Liang-chi (China) Ouyang Bowen	7	5	[11]

Second round
1	(Hungary) M Fucsovics (Hungary) M Zsiga	3	7	[4]
(Brazil) G Clézar (Brazil) T Fernandes	6	6^{6}	[10]
(Bolivia) H Dellien (Venezuela) R Rodríguez	6^{2}	3
6	(Bosnia and Herzegovina) D Džumhur (Croatia) M Pavić	7	6
3	(Peru) D Beretta (Ecuador) R Quiroz	6	6
(United States) M Krueger (United States) D Webb	2	2
(Germany) P Heller (Germany) K Krawietz	7	7
8	(Chinese Taipei) L-c Huang (China) B Ouyang	5	6^{6}

Quarterfinals
(Brazil) G Clézar (Brazil) T Fernandes	6	3	[10]
6	(Bosnia and Herzegovina) D Džumhur (Croatia) M Pavić	4	6	[6]
3	(Peru) D Beretta (Ecuador) R Quiroz	6	6
(Germany) P Heller (Germany) K Krawietz	1	3

Semifinals
(Brazil) G Clézar (Brazil) T Fernandes	0	3
3	(Peru) D Beretta (Ecuador) R Quiroz	6	6

=== Bottom half ===
First round
5	(Colombia) Juan Sebastián Gómez (Japan) Yasutaka Uchiyama	6	1	[5]
(Republic of Ireland) Sam Barry (New Zealand) Ben McLachlan	2	6	[10]
(Republic of Ireland) John Morrissey (Australia) Ben Wagland	4	7	[1]
(Brazil) Karue Sell (Brazil) Bruno Semenzato	6	5	[10]
(Belgium) Joris De Loore (Netherlands) Jannick Lupescu	6	4	[12]
(Spain) Andrés Artuñedo (Japan) Taro Daniel	2	6	[10]
WC	(United States) Daniel Kosakowski (United States) Dennis Novikov	6	3	[6]
4	(United Kingdom) Oliver Golding (Czech Republic) Jiří Veselý	4	6	[10]
7	(United States) Denis Kudla (United States) Raymond Sarmiento	4	4
(Austria) Dominic Thiem (Germany) Matthias Wunner	6	6
(Russia) Victor Baluda (Russia) Alexander Rumyantsev	6	6
(Belgium) Julien Cagnina (Brazil) Augusto Laranja	0	0
(France) Mathias Bourgue (United Kingdom) George Morgan	4	6	[10]
(Canada) Pavel Krainik (Italy) Giammarco Micolani	6	3	[5]
WC	(United States) Andrea Collarini (United States) Jack Sock	6	6
2	(Argentina) Renzo Olivo (Argentina) Agustín Velotti	2	0

Second round
(Republic of Ireland) S Barry (New Zealand) B McLachlan	6^{5}	6	[7]
(Brazil) K Sell (Brazil) B Semenzato	7	4	[10]
(Belgium) J De Loore (Netherlands) J Lupescu	4	6	[7]
4	(United Kingdom) O Golding (Czech Republic) J Veselý	6	4	[10]
(Austria) D Thiem (Germany) M Wunner	6	0	[8]
(Russia) V Baluda (Russia) A Rumyantsev	2	6	[10]
(France) M Bourgue (United Kingdom) G Morgan	6	3	[8]
WC	(United States) A Collarini (United States) J Sock	4	6	[10]

Quarterfinals
(Brazil) K Sell (Brazil) B Semenzato	1	3
4	(United Kingdom) O Golding (Czech Republic) J Veselý	6	6
(Russia) V Baluda (Russia) A Rumyantsev	6	6^{4}	[10]
WC	(United States) A Collarini (United States) J Sock	4	7	[5]

Semifinals
4	(United Kingdom) O Golding (Czech Republic) J Veselý	7	6^{6}	[10]
(Russia) V Baluda (Russia) A Rumyantsev	6^{6}	7	[6]
