= 2010 US Open – Men's doubles =

Men's doubles
- 2010 US Open

Final
- Champion: (United States) Bob Bryan (United States) Mike Bryan
- Runner-up: (India) Rohan Bopanna (Pakistan) Aisam-ul-Haq Qureshi
- Score: 7–6^{(7–5)}, 7–6^{(7–4)}

Details
- Draw: 64
- Seeds: 16

Events
Singles	men	women		boys	girls
Doubles	men	women	mixed	boys	girls
WC Singles	men	women	quad
WC Doubles	men	women	quad
Legends	men	women	mixed
- US Open

Bob and Mike Bryan defeated Rohan Bopanna and Aisam-ul-Haq Qureshi in the final, 7–6^{(7–5)}, 7–6^{(7–4)} to win the men's doubles tennis title at the 2010 US Open. The pair did not lose a set during the tournament.

Lukáš Dlouhý and Leander Paes were the defending champions, but lost in the first round to Martin Damm and Filip Polášek.

== Seeds ==
1. (United States) Bob Bryan / (United States) Mike Bryan (champions)
2. (Canada) Daniel Nestor / (Serbia) Nenad Zimonjić (third round)
3. (Czech Republic) Lukáš Dlouhý / (India) Leander Paes (first round)
4. (India) Mahesh Bhupathi / (Belarus) Max Mirnyi (second round)
5. (Poland) Łukasz Kubot / (Austria) Oliver Marach (quarterfinals)
6. (Czech Republic) František Čermák / (Slovakia) Michal Mertiňák (first round)
7. (Austria) Jürgen Melzer / (Germany) Philipp Petzschner (first round)
8. (Austria) Julian Knowle / (Israel) Andy Ram (first round)
9. (Poland) Mariusz Fyrstenberg / (Poland) Marcin Matkowski (quarterfinals)
10. (South Africa) Wesley Moodie / (Belgium) Dick Norman (quarterfinals)
11. (France) Julien Benneteau / (France) Michaël Llodra (second round, withdrew due to both players' injuries)
12. (Spain) Marcel Granollers / (Spain) Tommy Robredo (semifinals)
13. (Sweden) Robert Lindstedt / (Romania) Horia Tecău (third round)
14. (Sweden) Simon Aspelin / (Australia) Paul Hanley (quarterfinals)
15. (United States) Mardy Fish / (The Bahamas) Mark Knowles (third round)
16. (India) Rohan Bopanna / (Pakistan) Aisam-ul-Haq Qureshi (final)

== Draw ==
Key

- Q = Qualifier
- WC = Wild card
- LL = Lucky loser
- Alt = Alternate
- ITF = ITF entry
- PR = Protected ranking
- SR = Special ranking
- SE = Special exempt
- JE = Junior exempt
- JR = Junior Accelerator Programme entrant
- CO = College Accelerator Programme entrant
- NG = Next Gen Accelerator Program entrant
- w/o = Walkover
- r = Retired
- d = Defaulted

=== Finals ===
Quarterfinals
1	(United States) Bob Bryan (United States) Mike Bryan	6	7
9	(Poland) Mariusz Fyrstenberg (Poland) Marcin Matkowski	3	5
14	(Sweden) Simon Aspelin (Australia) Paul Hanley	4	6^{7}
12	(Spain) Marcel Granollers (Spain) Tommy Robredo	6	7
5	(Poland) Łukasz Kubot (Austria) Oliver Marach	3	6^{3}
(Argentina) Eduardo Schwank (Argentina) Horacio Zeballos	6	7
10	(South Africa) Wesley Moodie (Belgium) Dick Norman	5	6^{2}
16	(India) Rohan Bopanna (Pakistan) Aisam-ul-Haq Qureshi	7	7

Semifinals
1	(United States) Bob Bryan (United States) Mike Bryan	6	6
12	(Spain) Marcel Granollers (Spain) Tommy Robredo	1	4
(Argentina) Eduardo Schwank (Argentina) Horacio Zeballos	6^{5}	4
16	(India) Rohan Bopanna (Pakistan) Aisam-ul-Haq Qureshi	7	6

Final
1	(United States) Bob Bryan (United States) Mike Bryan	7	7
16	(India) Rohan Bopanna (Pakistan) Aisam-ul-Haq Qureshi	6^{5}	6^{4}

=== Top half ===
==== Section 1 ====
First round
1	(United States) B Bryan (United States) M Bryan	6	6
(Ukraine) A Dolgopolov (Germany) B Phau	3	2
(France) M Gicquel (France) G Monfils	1	2
WC	(United States) B Klahn (United States) T Smyczek	6	6
(Switzerland) M Chiudinelli (Slovakia) L Lacko	6	7
WC	(United States) D Martin (United States) D Young	4	5
(Spain) M López (Spain) P Riba	6	4	4
15	(United States) M Fish (The Bahamas) M Knowles	3	6	6
9	(Poland) M Fyrstenberg (Poland) M Matkowski	6	6
(Spain) G García-López (Spain) A Montañés	3	4
(Italy) A Seppi (Italy) S Vagnozzi	2	3
WC	(United States) R Harrison (United States) R Kendrick	6	6
(Colombia) A Falla (Colombia) S Giraldo	7	4	3
(France) J Chardy (Germany) C Kas	6^{2}	6	6
(Israel) J Erlich (Australia) J Kerr	7	6^{3}	7
8	(Austria) J Knowle (Israel) A Ram	5	7	6^{9}

Second round
1	(United States) B Bryan (United States) M Bryan	6	6
WC	(United States) B Klahn (United States) T Smyczek	3	1
(Switzerland) M Chiudinelli (Slovakia) L Lacko	4	1
15	(United States) M Fish (The Bahamas) M Knowles	6	6
9	(Poland) M Fyrstenberg (Poland) M Matkowski	6^{2}	6	7
WC	(United States) R Harrison (United States) R Kendrick	7	3	6^{4}
(France) J Chardy (Germany) C Kas	7	4	6
(Israel) J Erlich (Australia) J Kerr	5	6	4

Third round
1	(United States) B Bryan (United States) M Bryan	7	6
15	(United States) M Fish (The Bahamas) M Knowles	5	3
9	(Poland) M Fyrstenberg (Poland) M Matkowski	6	6
(France) J Chardy (Germany) C Kas	2	4

Quarterfinals
1	(United States) B Bryan (United States) M Bryan	6	7
9	(Poland) M Fyrstenberg (Poland) M Matkowski	3	5

==== Section 2 ====
First round
3	(Czech Republic) L Dlouhý (India) L Paes	7	3	4
(Czech Republic) M Damm (Slovakia) F Polášek	6^{7}	6	6
(Chinese Taipei) Y-h Lu (Serbia) J Tipsarević	6^{12}	6^{2}
(Ukraine) S Stakhovsky (Russia) M Youzhny	7	7
(Germany) P Marx (Slovakia) I Zelenay	5	6	7
Alt	(Germany) D Brands (Germany) S Greul	7	3	5
(United States) M Russell (Russia) D Tursunov	3	6	3
14	(Sweden) S Aspelin (Australia) P Hanley	6	3	6
12	(Spain) M Granollers (Spain) T Robredo	6	6^{5}	7
(Mexico) S González (United States) T Rettenmaier	4	7	6^{1}
(Australia) S Huss (Brazil) A Sá	3	3
(United States) R Ram (United States) B Reynolds	6	6
(Germany) F Mayer (Netherlands) R Wassen	6	6
(Sweden) J Brunström (United States) T Parrott	4	1
(South Africa) K Anderson (Romania) V Hănescu	4	6	7
7	(Austria) J Melzer (Germany) P Petzschner	6	3	6^{1}

Second round
(Czech Republic) M Damm (Slovakia) F Polášek	4	6	6^{1}
(Ukraine) S Stakhovsky (Russia) M Youzhny	6	1	7
(Germany) P Marx (Slovakia) I Zelenay	3	2
14	(Sweden) S Aspelin (Australia) P Hanley	6	6
12	(Spain) M Granollers (Spain) T Robredo	6	6
(United States) R Ram (United States) B Reynolds	4	3
(Germany) F Mayer (Netherlands) R Wassen
(South Africa) K Anderson (Romania) V Hănescu	w/o

Third round
(Ukraine) S Stakhovsky (Russia) M Youzhny	2	6	6^{2}
14	(Sweden) S Aspelin (Australia) P Hanley	6	3	7
12	(Spain) M Granollers (Spain) T Robredo	6	4	6
(Germany) F Mayer (Netherlands) R Wassen	3	6	1

Quarterfinals
14	(Sweden) S Aspelin (Australia) P Hanley	4	6^{7}
12	(Spain) M Granollers (Spain) T Robredo	6	7

=== Bottom half ===
==== Section 3 ====
First round
5	(Poland) Ł Kubot (Austria) O Marach	7	6
(United Kingdom) R Hutchins (United States) S Lipsky	6^{4}	3
(Germany) B Becker (Argentina) L Mayer	6	6
(Czech Republic) L Friedl (Serbia) D Vemić	2	4
(Portugal) F Gil (Spain) D Gimeno-Traver	6	6
(Belgium) X Malisse (Belgium) O Rochus	4	2
(Australia) C Ball (Australia) C Guccione	3	6^{4}
11	(France) J Benneteau (France) M Llodra	6	7
13	(Sweden) R Lindstedt (Romania) H Tecău	6	6
WC	(United States) R Ginepri (United States) R Sweeting	4	2
(Kazakhstan) A Golubev (Uzbekistan) D Istomin	4	6	2
(Italy) D Bracciali (Italy) P Starace	6	4	6
(Argentina) E Schwank (Argentina) H Zeballos	6	7
(United Kingdom) C Fleming (United Kingdom) K Skupski	2	6^{6}
(France) A Clément (France) N Mahut	1	4
4	(India) M Bhupathi (Belarus) M Mirnyi	6	6

Second round
5	(Poland) Ł Kubot (Austria) O Marach	6	6
(Germany) B Becker (Argentina) L Mayer	2	4
(Portugal) F Gil (Spain) D Gimeno-Traver
11	(France) J Benneteau (France) M Llodra	w/o
13	(Sweden) R Lindstedt (Romania) H Tecău	6	6
(Italy) D Bracciali (Italy) P Starace	3	4
(Argentina) E Schwank (Argentina) H Zeballos	6	3	7
4	(India) M Bhupathi (Belarus) M Mirnyi	4	6	6^{4}

Third round
5	(Poland) Ł Kubot (Austria) O Marach	2	6	6
(Portugal) F Gil (Spain) D Gimeno-Traver	6	3	4
13	(Sweden) R Lindstedt (Romania) H Tecău	6^{3}	6	3
(Argentina) E Schwank (Argentina) H Zeballos	7	3	6

Quarterfinals
5	(Poland) Ł Kubot (Austria) O Marach	3	6^{3}
(Argentina) E Schwank (Argentina) H Zeballos	6	7

==== Section 4 ====
First round
6	(Czech Republic) F Čermák (Slovakia) M Mertiňák	6^{4}	5
(Brazil) M Melo (Brazil) B Soares	7	7
(Argentina) JI Chela (Uruguay) P Cuevas	6	7
(Russia) T Gabashvili (Spain) F López	4	6^{4}
(Spain) D Marrero (Spain) R Ramírez Hidalgo	6	7
(Czech Republic) J Hájek (Belgium) K Vliegen	3	5
WC	(United States) D Courtney (United States) M Shabaz	3	4
10	(South Africa) W Moodie (Belgium) D Norman	6	6
16	(India) R Bopanna (Pakistan) A-u-H Qureshi	6	7
WC	(United States) B Battistone (United States) R DeHeart	3	6^{7}
WC	(United States) S Bangoura (United States) N Pasha	3	1
(Germany) M Kohlmann (Finland) J Nieminen	6	6
(Germany) M Berrer (Serbia) V Troicki	4	4
(Argentina) M González (Spain) S Ventura	6	6
(United States) E Butorac (Netherlands Antilles) J-J Rojer	6^{6}	3
2	(Canada) D Nestor (Serbia) N Zimonjić	7	6

Second round
(Brazil) M Melo (Brazil) B Soares	6	2	7
(Argentina) JI Chela (Uruguay) P Cuevas	4	6	6^{2}
(Spain) D Marrero (Spain) R Ramírez Hidalgo	3	6	6^{5}
10	(South Africa) W Moodie (Belgium) D Norman	6	3	7
16	(India) R Bopanna (Pakistan) A-u-H Qureshi	6	6
(Germany) M Kohlmann (Finland) J Nieminen	4	4
(Argentina) M González (Spain) S Ventura	7	3	1
2	(Canada) D Nestor (Serbia) N Zimonjić	6^{6}	6	6

Third round
(Brazil) M Melo (Brazil) B Soares	2	2
10	(South Africa) W Moodie (Belgium) D Norman	6	6
16	(India) R Bopanna (Pakistan) A-u-H Qureshi	6	6
2	(Canada) D Nestor (Serbia) N Zimonjić	3	4

Quarterfinals
10	(South Africa) W Moodie (Belgium) D Norman	5	6^{2}
16	(India) R Bopanna (Pakistan) A-u-H Qureshi	7	7
