= 2010 US Open – Wheelchair men's singles =

Wheelchair men's singles
- 2010 US Open

Final
- Champion: (Japan) Shingo Kunieda
- Runner-up: (France) Nicolas Peifer
- Score: walkover

Events
Singles	men	women		boys	girls
Doubles	men	women	mixed	boys	girls
WC Singles	men	women	quad
WC Doubles	men	women	quad
Legends	men	women	mixed
← 2009 ·	US Open	· 2011 →

Two-time defending champion Shingo Kunieda won the men's singles wheelchair tennis title at the 2010 US Open after Nicolas Peifer withdrew before the final. It was his third US Open singles title and eleventh major singles title overall.

== Seeds ==
1. (Japan) Shingo Kunieda (champion)
2. (Netherlands) Maikel Scheffers (semifinals)

== Draw ==
=== Key ===
- Q = Qualifier
- WC = Wild card
- LL = Lucky loser
- Alt = Alternate
- ITF = ITF entry
- PR = Protected ranking
- SR = Special ranking
- SE = Special exempt
- JE = Junior exempt
- JR = Junior Accelerator Programme entrant
- CO = College Accelerator Programme entrant
- NG = Next Gen Accelerator Program entrant
- w/o = Walkover
- r = Retired
- d = Defaulted

=== Finals ===
Quarterfinals
1	(Japan) Shingo Kunieda	6	6
(Netherlands) Ronald Vink	0	0
WC	(United States) Jon Rydberg	1	4
(France) Stéphane Houdet	6	6
(Netherlands) Robin Ammerlaan	0	4
(France) Nicolas Peifer	6	6
(Sweden) Stefan Olsson	6	4	2
2	(Netherlands) Maikel Scheffers	4	6	6

Semifinals
1	(Japan) Shingo Kunieda	6	6
(France) Stéphane Houdet	2	1
(France) Nicolas Peifer	7	7
2	(Netherlands) Maikel Scheffers	5	6^{3}

Finals
1	(Japan) Shingo Kunieda
(France) Nicolas Peifer	w/o
