= 2010 US Open – Wheelchair quad singles =

Wheelchair quad singles
- 2010 US Open

Final
- Champion: (United States) David Wagner
- Runner-up: (United Kingdom) Peter Norfolk
- Score: 6–0, 2–6, 6–3

Events
Singles	men	women		boys	girls
Doubles	men	women	mixed	boys	girls
WC Singles	men	women	quad
WC Doubles	men	women	quad
Legends	men	women	mixed
- US Open

David Wagner defeated the two-time defending champion Peter Norfolk in the final, 6–0, 2–6, 6–3 to win the quad singles wheelchair tennis title at the 2010 US Open.

== Draw ==
Key

- Q = Qualifier
- WC = Wild card
- LL = Lucky loser
- Alt = Alternate
- ITF = ITF entry
- PR = Protected ranking
- SR = Special ranking
- SE = Special exempt
- JE = Junior exempt
- JR = Junior Accelerator Programme entrant
- CO = College Accelerator Programme entrant
- NG = Next Gen Accelerator Program entrant
- w/o = Walkover
- r = Retired
- d = Defaulted

=== Final ===
Final
1	(United States) David Wagner	6	2	6
2	(United Kingdom) Peter Norfolk	0	6	3

=== Round robin ===
		(United States) Wagner	(Sweden) Andersson	(United States) Taylor	(United Kingdom) Norfolk	RR W–L	Set W–L	Game W–L	Standings
1	(United States) David Wagner		6–1, 6–4	6–1, 6–0	4–6, 7–5, 6–7^{(6–8)}	2–1	5–2	41–24	2
	(Sweden) Johan Andersson	1–6, 4–6		6–3, 6–7^{(4–7)}, 6–3	2–6, 2–6	1–2	2–5	27–37	3
WC	(United States) Nick Taylor	1–6, 0–6	3–6, 7–6^{(7–4)}, 3–6		1–6, 0–6	0–3	1–6	15–42	4
2	(United Kingdom) Peter Norfolk	6–4, 5–7, 7–6^{(8–6)}	6–2, 6–2	6–1, 6–0		3–0	6–1	42–22	1

Standings are determined by: 1. number of wins; 2. number of matches; 3. in two-players-ties, head-to-head records; 4. in three-players-ties, percentage of sets won, or of games won; 5. steering-committee decision.
