= 2010 US Open – Boys' singles =

Boys' singles
- 2010 US Open

Final
- Champion: (United States) Jack Sock
- Runner-up: (United States) Denis Kudla
- Score: 3–6, 6–2, 6–2

Events
Singles	men	women		boys	girls
Doubles	men	women	mixed	boys	girls
WC Singles	men	women	quad
WC Doubles	men	women	quad
Legends	men	women	mixed
- US Open

The boys' singles tournament of the 2010 US Open started on Sunday, September 5, the seventh day of the main tournament.

Bernard Tomic was the defending champion, but he did not defend his title as he had stopped playing junior tournaments in 2010, despite still being eligible to do so as a 1992 birth.

Jack Sock, who received a wildcard into the singles main draw, won this tournament after defeating his compatriot, tenth-seeded Denis Kudla, in the final.

== Seeds ==
1. (Colombia) Juan Sebastián Gómez (first round)
2. (Hungary) Márton Fucsovics (semifinals)
3. (Brazil) Tiago Fernandes (third round)
4. (Czech Republic) Jiří Veselý (quarterfinals)
5. (Bosnia and Herzegovina) Damir Džumhur (third round)
6. (Australia) Jason Kubler (first round)
7. (Peru) Duilio Beretta (second round, retired)
8. (Argentina) Agustín Velotti (semifinals)
9. (Australia) James Duckworth (first round)
10. (United States) Denis Kudla (final)
11. (Argentina) Renzo Olivo (first round)
12. (Hungary) Máté Zsiga (first round)
13. (Russia) Victor Baluda (quarterfinals)
14. (Austria) Dominic Thiem (first round)
15. (Ecuador) Roberto Quiroz (first round)
16. (United States) Mitchell Frank (third round)

== Draw ==
Key

- Q = Qualifier
- WC = Wild card
- LL = Lucky loser
- Alt = Alternate
- ITF = ITF entry
- PR = Protected ranking
- SR = Special ranking
- SE = Special exempt
- JE = Junior exempt
- JR = Junior Accelerator Programme entrant
- CO = College Accelerator Programme entrant
- NG = Next Gen Accelerator Program entrant
- w/o = Walkover
- r = Retired
- d = Defaulted

=== Finals ===
Quarterfinals
(Slovakia) Filip Horanský	5	1
10	(United States) Denis Kudla	7	6
4	(Czech Republic) Jiří Veselý	4	2
8	(Argentina) Agustín Velotti	6	6
WC	(United States) Jack Sock	6	7^{7}
13	(Russia) Victor Baluda	3	6^{4}
(United States) Dennis Novikov	2	6	3
2	(Hungary) Márton Fucsovics	6	4	6

Semifinals
10	(United States) Denis Kudla	6	6
8	(Argentina) Agustín Velotti	3	2
WC	(United States) Jack Sock	6	6
2	(Hungary) Márton Fucsovics	3	4

Final
10	(United States) Denis Kudla	6	2	2
WC	(United States) Jack Sock	3	6	6

=== Top half ===
==== Section 1 ====
First round
1	(Colombia) Juan Sebastián Gómez	6^{4}	6	3
WC	(United States) Andrea Collarini	7^{7}	4	6
(Brazil) Guilherme Clézar	6	3	6
(Venezuela) Ricardo Rodríguez	3	6	0
(Slovakia) Filip Horanský	7^{7}	6
WC	(United States) Junior Alexander Ore	6^{5}	1
(United Kingdom) George Morgan	6	4	7
15	(Ecuador) Roberto Quiroz	4	6	5
10	(United States) Denis Kudla	4	6	6
(China) Wang Chuhan	6	1	3
Q	(Japan) Daiki Kondo	2	2
(Germany) Kevin Krawietz	6	6
(Croatia) Mate Delić	6	6
WC	(United States) Michael Redlicki	3	4
WC	(United States) Evan King	7	6
6	(Australia) Jason Kubler	5	1

Second round
WC	(United States) A Collarini	7^{7}	6
(Brazil) G Clézar	6^{1}	3
(Slovakia) F Horanský	6	6
(United Kingdom) G Morgan	3	3
10	(United States) D Kudla	4	6	6
(Germany) K Krawietz	6	4	2
(Croatia) M Delić	0	0
WC	(United States) E King	6	6

Third round
WC	(United States) A Collarini	3	4
(Slovakia) F Horanský	6	6
10	(United States) D Kudla	6^{5}	7	6
WC	(United States) E King	7^{7}	5	4

Quarterfinals
(Slovakia) F Horanský	5	1
10	(United States) D Kudla	7	6

==== Section 2 ====
First round
4	(Czech Republic) Jiří Veselý	7	6
(Chinese Taipei) Huang Liang-chi	5	3
Q	(United States) Mackenzie McDonald	3	2
(Russia) Alexander Rumyantsev	6	6
(United States) Raymond Sarmiento	6^{6}	6	4
Q	(Brazil) Karue Sell	7^{8}	4	6
(Japan) Taro Daniel	6	6
14	(Austria) Dominic Thiem	4	0
12	(Hungary) Máté Zsiga	5	4
(Belgium) Joris De Loore	7	6
(Bolivia) Hugo Dellien	2	6	3
WC	(United States) Daniel Kosakowski	6	4	6
LL	(Italy) Giammarco Micolani	4	7^{8}	6
(United States) Dane Webb	6	6^{6}	4
(Germany) Matthias Wunner	6	6^{2}	2
8	(Argentina) Agustín Velotti	3	7^{7}	6

Second round
4	(Czech Republic) J Veselý	6	6
(Russia) A Rumyantsev	3	2
Q	(Brazil) K Sell	5	4
(Japan) T Daniel	7	6
(Belgium) J De Loore	3	2
WC	(United States) D Kosakowski	6	6
LL	(Italy) G Micolani	6^{5}	4
8	(Argentina) A Velotti	7^{7}	6

Third round
4	(Czech Republic) J Veselý	6	6^{2}	6
(Japan) T Daniel	1	7^{7}	0
WC	(United States) D Kosakowski	6^{4}	5
8	(Argentina) A Velotti	7^{7}	7

Quarterfinals
4	(Czech Republic) J Veselý	4	2
8	(Argentina) A Velotti	6	6

=== Bottom half ===
==== Section 3 ====
First round
5	(Bosnia and Herzegovina) Damir Džumhur	6	6
(France) Mathias Bourgue	4	4
Q	(Republic of Ireland) Sam Barry	6	6
(United States) Nick Chappell	1	3
(China) Ouyang Bowen	1	6^{4}
WC	(United States) Jack Sock	6	7^{7}
(Germany) Peter Heller	6	7
11	(Argentina) Renzo Olivo	3	5
13	(Russia) Victor Baluda	3	6	6
(Australia) Ben Wagland	6	1	3
(Slovakia) Jozef Kovalík	6	6
(United States) Bjorn Fratangelo	3	4
(New Zealand) Ben McLachlan	1	6^{4}
(Croatia) Mate Pavić	6	7^{7}
WC	(United States) Mitchell Krueger	0	1
3	(Brazil) Tiago Fernandes	6	6

Second round
5	(Bosnia and Herzegovina) D Džumhur	6	6
Q	(Republic of Ireland) S Barry	4	2
WC	(United States) J Sock	6	6
(Germany) P Heller	1	3
13	(Russia) V Baluda	6^{1}	6	6
(Slovakia) J Kovalík	7^{7}	2	3
(Croatia) M Pavić	3	6^{5}
3	(Brazil) T Fernandes	6	7^{7}

Third round
5	(Bosnia and Herzegovina) D Džumhur	6^{3}	3
WC	(United States) J Sock	7^{7}	6
13	(Russia) V Baluda	6	4	6
3	(Brazil) T Fernandes	4	6	3

Quarterfinals
WC	(United States) J Sock	6	7^{7}
13	(Russia) V Baluda	3	6^{4}

==== Section 4 ====
First round
7	(Peru) Duilio Beretta	6	7
(Philippines) Jeson Patrombon	2	5
Q	(Belgium) Julien Cagnina	4	3
(United States) Dennis Novikov	6	6
(Japan) Yasutaka Uchiyama	7^{8}	4	6
Q	(United States) Michael Zhu	6^{6}	6	0
(Netherlands) Jannick Lupescu	5	6	7^{7}
9	(Australia) James Duckworth	7	4	6^{3}
16	(United States) Mitchell Frank	6	6
(Barbados) Darian King	4	1
(United Kingdom) Oliver Golding	7^{11}	6
(Spain) Andrés Artuñedo	6^{9}	3
Q	(Brazil) Bruno Semenzato	4	1
Q	(United States) Alexios Halebian	6	6
(Czech Republic) Lukáš Vrňák	6	5	4
2	(Hungary) Márton Fucsovics	4	7	6

Second round
7	(Peru) D Beretta	6	6^{3}	1^{r}
(United States) D Novikov	2	7^{7}	4
(Japan) Y Uchiyama	6	6
(Netherlands) J Lupescu	2	3
16	(United States) M Frank	6	6
(United Kingdom) O Golding	4	2
Q	(United States) A Halebian	6	1	3
2	(Hungary) M Fucsovics	3	6	6

Third round
(United States) D Novikov	7	6
(Japan) Y Uchiyama	5	3
16	(United States) M Frank	4	1
2	(Hungary) M Fucsovics	6	6

Quarterfinals
(United States) D Novikov	2	6	3
2	(Hungary) M Fucsovics	6	4	6
