= 2010 US Open – Wheelchair women's singles =

Wheelchair women's singles
- 2010 US Open

Final
- Champion: (Netherlands) Esther Vergeer
- Runner-up: (Australia) Daniela Di Toro
- Score: 6–0, 6–0

Events
Singles	men	women		boys	girls
Doubles	men	women	mixed	boys	girls
WC Singles	men	women	quad
WC Doubles	men	women	quad
Legends	men	women	mixed
← 2009 ·	US Open	· 2011 →

Four-time defending champion Esther Vergeer defeated Daniela Di Toro in the final, 6–0, 6–0 to win the women's singles wheelchair tennis title at the 2010 US Open.

== Seeds ==
1. (Netherlands) Esther Vergeer (champion)
2. (Netherlands) Sharon Walraven (semifinals)

== Draw ==
=== Key ===
- Q = Qualifier
- WC = Wild card
- LL = Lucky loser
- Alt = Alternate
- ITF = ITF entry
- PR = Protected ranking
- SR = Special ranking
- SE = Special exempt
- JE = Junior exempt
- JR = Junior Accelerator Programme entrant
- CO = College Accelerator Programme entrant
- NG = Next Gen Accelerator Program entrant
- w/o = Walkover
- r = Retired
- d = Defaulted

=== Finals ===
Quarterfinals
1	(Netherlands) Esther Vergeer	7	7
(France) Florence Alix-Gravellier	5	5
(Netherlands) Jiske Griffioen	6	6
WC	(United States) Mackenzie Soldan	1	1
(Australia) Daniela Di Toro	6	7
(Netherlands) Aniek van Koot	3	6^{2}
(Belgium) Annick Sevenans	4	3
2	(Netherlands) Sharon Walraven	6	6

Semifinals
1	(Netherlands) Esther Vergeer	6	6
(Netherlands) Jiske Griffioen	1	0
(Australia) Daniela Di Toro	6	6
2	(Netherlands) Sharon Walraven	4	2

Finals
1	(Netherlands) Esther Vergeer	6	6
(Australia) Daniela Di Toro	0	0
