= 2011 RBC Bank Women's Challenger =

- Date: 9–15 May
- Edition: 7th
- Location: Raleigh, North Carolina, United States

Champions

Singles
- (Slovenia) Petra Rampre

Doubles
- (Canada) Sharon Fichman / (Canada) Marie-Ève Pelletier
← 2010 ·	RBC Bank Women's Challenger	· 2012 →

The 2011 RBC Bank Women's Challenger is a professional tennis tournament played on clay courts. It is part of the 2011 ITF Women's Circuit. It took place in Raleigh, North Carolina, United States in 9 and 15 May 2011.

== Singles entrants ==
=== Seeds ===
Country	Player	Rank^{1}	Seed
POR	Michelle Larcher de Brito	165	1
USA	Julia Cohen	169	2
UKR	Tetiana Luzhanska	194	3
USA	Alexa Glatch	223	4
USA	Alexandra Stevenson	236	5
ITA	Camila Giorgi	240	6
USA	Ashley Weinhold	247	6
USA	Julie Ditty	248	8

- Rankings are as of May 2, 2010.

=== Other entrants ===
The following players received wildcards into the singles main draw:

- (United States) Chieh-yu Hsu
- (United States) Simone Kalhorn
- (United States) Lena Litvak
- (United States) Asia Muhammad

The following players received entry from the qualifying draw:

- (United States) Alexandra Mueller
- (United States) Jessica Pegula
- (Canada) Marie-Ève Pelletier
- (United States) Yasmin Schnack

The following players received entry by a lucky loser spot:

- (United States) Alexis King

== Champions ==
=== Singles ===
(Slovenia) Petra Rampre def. (Italy) Camila Giorgi, 6–3, 6–2

=== Doubles ===
(Canada) Sharon Fichman / (Canada) Marie-Ève Pelletier def. (United States) Beatrice Capra / (United States) Asia Muhammad, 6–1, 6–3
