= 2010 US Open – Day-by-day summaries =

== Day 1 (August 30) ==
- Seeds out:
  - Men's Singles: (Chile) Fernando González [27], (Australia) Lleyton Hewitt [32]
- Schedule of play

Matches on main courts
Matches on Arthur Ashe Stadium
Event	Winner	Loser	Score
Women's Singles 1st Round	(United States) Melanie Oudin	(Ukraine) Olga Savchuk [Q]	6–3, 6–0
Women's Singles 1st Round	(Belgium) Kim Clijsters [2]	(Hungary) Gréta Arn	6–0, 7–5
Men's Singles 1st Round	(United States) Andy Roddick [9]	(France) Stéphane Robert	6–3, 6–2, 6–2
2010 US Open Opening Night Ceremony
Women's Singles 1st Round	(United States) Venus Williams [3]	(Italy) Roberta Vinci	6–4, 6–1
Men's Singles 1st Round	(Switzerland) Roger Federer [2]	(Argentina) Brian Dabul	6–1, 6–4, 6–2
Matches on Louis Armstrong Stadium
Event	Winner	Loser	Score
Men's Singles 1st Round	(Russia) Nikolay Davydenko [6]	(United States) Michael Russell	6–4, 6–1, 6–3
Women's Singles 1st Round	(Slovakia) Daniela Hantuchová [24]	(Russia) Dinara Safina	6–3, 6–4
Women's Singles 1st Round	(Australia) Samantha Stosur [5]	(Russia) Elena Vesnina	3–6, 7–6^{(7–2)}, 6–1
Men's Singles 1st Round	(France) Paul-Henri Mathieu	(Australia) Lleyton Hewitt [32]	6–3, 6–4, 5–7, 4–6, 6–1
Matches on the Grandstand
Event	Winner	Loser	Score
Women's Singles 1st Round	(Italy) Francesca Schiavone [6]	(Japan) Ayumi Morita	6–1, 6–0
Men's Singles 1st Round	(Sweden) Robin Söderling [5]	(Austria) Andreas Haider-Maurer [Q]	7–5, 6–3, 6–7^{(2–7)}, 5–7, 6–4
Men's Singles 1st Round	(United States) Taylor Dent	(Colombia) Alejandro Falla	6–4, 7–5, 6–1
Women's Singles 1st Round	(Serbia) Ana Ivanovic	(Russia) Ekaterina Makarova	6–3, 6–2
Colored background indicates a night match

== Day 2 (August 31) ==
- Seeds out:
  - Men's Singles: (Cyprus) Marcos Baghdatis [16], (Latvia) Ernests Gulbis [24], (Czech Republic) Radek Štěpánek [28], (Argentina) Juan Mónaco [30]
  - Women's Singles: (China) Li Na [8], (Russia) Nadia Petrova [17], (Czech Republic) Lucie Šafářová [26], (Kazakhstan) Yaroslava Shvedova [30]
  - Men's Doubles: (Czech Republic) Lukáš Dlouhý / (India) Leander Paes [3], (Czech Republic) František Čermák / (Slovakia) Michal Mertiňák [6]
- Schedule of play

Matches on main courts
Matches on Arthur Ashe Stadium
Event	Winner	Loser	Score
Women's Singles 1st Round	(Serbia) Jelena Janković [4]	(Romania) Simona Halep	6–4, 4–6, 7–5
Men's Singles 1st Round	(Serbia) Novak Djokovic [3]	(Serbia) Viktor Troicki	6–3, 3–6, 2–6, 7–5, 6–3
Women's Singles 1st Round	(Russia) Maria Sharapova [14]	(Australia) Jarmila Groth	4–6, 6–3, 6–1
Men's Singles 1st Round	(Spain) Rafael Nadal [1]	(Russia) Teymuraz Gabashvili	7–6^{(7–4)}, 7–6^{(7–4)}, 6–3
Women's Singles 1st Round	(Denmark) Caroline Wozniacki [1]	(United States) Chelsey Gullickson [WC]	6–1, 6–1
Matches on Louis Armstrong Stadium
Event	Winner	Loser	Score
Men's Singles 1st Round	(France) Arnaud Clément	(Cyprus) Marcos Baghdatis [16]	6–3, 2–6, 1–6, 6–4, 7–5
Women's Singles 1st Round	(Ukraine) Kateryna Bondarenko	(China) Li Na [8]	2–6, 6–4, 6–2
Men's Singles 1st Round	(United States) James Blake [WC]	(Belgium) Kristof Vliegen	6–3, 6–2, 6–4
Women's Singles 1st Round	(Russia) Vera Zvonareva [7]	(Slovakia) Zuzana Kučová [Q]	6–2, 6–1
Women's Singles 1st Round	(Germany) Andrea Petkovic	(Russia) Nadia Petrova [17]	6–2, 4–6, 7–6^{(7–4)}
Matches on the Grandstand
Event	Winner	Loser	Score
Women's Singles 1st Round	(Russia) Svetlana Kuznetsova [11]	(Japan) Kimiko Date-Krumm	6–2, 4–6, 6–1
Men's Singles 1st Round	(United States) Mardy Fish [19]	(Czech Republic) Jan Hájek	6–0, 3–6, 4–6, 6–0, 6–1
Men's Singles 1st Round	(Spain) Fernando Verdasco [8]	(Italy) Fabio Fognini	1–6, 7–5, 6–1, 4–6, 6–3
Women's Singles 1st Round	(Germany) Sabine Lisicki	(United States) Coco Vandeweghe [WC]	6–1, 6–0
Colored background indicates a night match

== Day 3 (September 1) ==
- Schedule of play
- Seeds out:
  - Men's Singles: (Czech Republic) Tomáš Berdych [7], (United States) Andy Roddick [9], (Croatia) Ivan Ljubičić [15]
  - Women's Singles: (Belarus) Victoria Azarenka [10], (France) Marion Bartoli [13], (China) Zheng Jie [21], (Russia) Alisa Kleybanova [28], (Bulgaria) Tsvetana Pironkova [32]
  - Men's Doubles: (Austria) Jürgen Melzer / (Germany) Philipp Petzschner [7]
  - Women's Doubles: (Spain) Nuria Llagostera Vives / (Spain) María José Martínez Sánchez [3]
  - Mixed Doubles: (United States) Vania King / (Romania) Horia Tecău [8]

Matches on main courts
Matches on Arthur Ashe Stadium
Event	Winner	Loser	Score
Women's Singles 2nd Round	(Serbia) Ana Ivanovic	(China) Zheng Jie [21]	6–3, 6–0
Men's Singles 1st Round	(United Kingdom) Andy Murray [4]	(Slovakia) Lukáš Lacko	6–3, 6–2, 6–2
Women's Singles 2nd Round	(United States) Venus Williams [3]	(Canada) Rebecca Marino [Q]	7–6^{(7–3)}, 6–3
Women's Singles 2nd Round	(Belgium) Kim Clijsters [2]	(Australia) Sally Peers [Q]	6–2, 6–1
Men's Singles 2nd Round	(Serbia) Janko Tipsarević	(United States) Andy Roddick [9]	3–6, 7–5, 6–3, 7–6^{(7–4)}
Matches on Louis Armstrong Stadium
Event	Winner	Loser	Score
Men's Singles 1st Round	(United States) Sam Querrey [20]	(United States) Bradley Klahn [WC]	6–3, 4–6, 7–5, 6–4
Women's Singles 2nd Round	(Slovakia) Daniela Hantuchová [24]	(United States) Vania King	5–7, 6–3, 6–4
Women's Singles 2nd Round	(Ukraine) Alona Bondarenko [29]	(United States) Melanie Oudin	6–2, 7–5
Men's Singles 1st Round	(United States) John Isner [18]	(Portugal) Frederico Gil	6–4, 6–3, 6–4
Matches on the Grandstand
Event	Winner	Loser	Score
Women's Singles 2nd Round	(Argentina) Gisela Dulko	(Belarus) Victoria Azarenka [10]	5–1, retired
Men's Singles 1st Round	(France) Michaël Llodra	(Czech Republic) Tomáš Berdych [7]	7–6(3), 6–4, 6–4
Women's Singles 2nd Round	(Italy) Francesca Schiavone [6]	(Italy) Maria Elena Camerin [Q]	6–2, 6–1
Men's Singles 2nd Round	(France) Gaël Monfils [17]	(Russia) Igor Andreev	6–3, 6–4, 6–3
Men's Doubles 1st Round	(United States) Bob Bryan [1] (United States) Mike Bryan [1]	(Ukraine) Alexandr Dolgopolov (Germany) Björn Phau	6–3, 6–2
Colored background indicates a night match

== Day 4 (September 2) ==
- Schedule of play
- Seeds out:
  - Men's Singles: (Russia) Nikolay Davydenko [6], (Croatia) Marin Čilić [11], (Brazil) Thomaz Bellucci [26]
  - Women's Singles: (Poland) Agnieszka Radwańska [9], (France) Aravane Rezaï [18], (Spain) María José Martínez Sánchez [22]
  - Men's Doubles: (Austria) Julian Knowle / (Israel) Andy Ram [8]

Matches on main courts
Matches on Arthur Ashe Stadium
Event	Winner	Loser	Score
Women's Singles 2nd Round	(Russia) Vera Zvonareva [7]	(Germany) Sabine Lisicki	6–1, 7–6^{(7–5)}
Women's Singles 2nd Round	(Denmark) Caroline Wozniacki [1]	(Chinese Taipei) Chang Kai-chen	6–0, 6–0
Men's Singles 2nd Round	(Switzerland) Roger Federer [2]	(Germany) Andreas Beck	6–3, 6–4, 6–3
Women's Singles 2nd Round	(Russia) Maria Sharapova [14]	(Czech Republic) Iveta Benešová	6–1, 6–2
Men's Singles 2nd Round	(Serbia) Novak Djokovic [3]	(Germany) Philipp Petzschner	7–5, 6–3, 7–6^{(8–6)}
Matches on Louis Armstrong Stadium
Event	Winner	Loser	Score
Men's Singles 2nd Round	(United States) Mardy Fish [19]	(Uruguay) Pablo Cuevas	7–5, 6–0, 6–2
Women's Singles 2nd Round	(Russia) Svetlana Kuznetsova [11]	(Latvia) Anastasija Sevastova	6–2, 6–3
Women's Singles 2nd Round	(Serbia) Jelena Janković [4]	(Croatia) Mirjana Lučić [Q]	6–4, 3–6, 6–2
Men's Singles 2nd Round	(United States) James Blake [WC]	(Canada) Peter Polansky [Q]	6–7^{(1–7)}, 6–3, 6–2, 6–4
Matches on the Grandstand
Event	Winner	Loser	Score
Women's Singles 2nd Round	(United States) Beatrice Capra [WC]	(France) Aravane Rezaï [18]	7–5, 2–6, 6–3
Men's Singles 2nd Round	(France) Richard Gasquet	(Russia) Nikolay Davydenko [6]	6–3, 6–4, 6–2
Men's Singles 2nd Round	(Sweden) Robin Söderling [5]	(United States) Taylor Dent	6–2, 6–2, 6–4
Women's Singles 2nd Round	(Germany) Andrea Petkovic	(United States) Bethanie Mattek-Sands	3–6, 6–3, 7–5
Women's Singles 2nd Round	(China) Peng Shuai	(Poland) Agnieszka Radwańska [9]	2–6, 6–1, 6–4
Colored background indicates a night match

== Day 5 (September 3) ==
- Schedule of play
- Seeds out:
  - Men's Singles: (Germany) Philipp Kohlschreiber [29]
  - Women's Singles: (Italy) Flavia Pennetta [19], (Slovakia) Daniela Hantuchová [24], (Czech Republic) Petra Kvitová [27], (Ukraine) Alona Bondarenko [29]
  - Men's Doubles: (France) Julien Benneteau / (France) Michaël Llodra [11]
  - Women's Doubles: (Spain) Anabel Medina Garrigues / (China) Yan Zi [8], (Russia) Alisa Kleybanova / (Russia) Ekaterina Makarova [11], (Chinese Taipei) Hsieh Su-wei / (China) Peng Shuai [16]
  - Mixed Doubles: (Australia) Rennae Stubbs / (Belgium) Dick Norman [5]

Matches on main courts
Matches on Arthur Ashe Stadium
Event	Winner	Loser	Score
Women's Singles 3rd Round	(Russia) Elena Dementieva [12]	(Slovakia) Daniela Hantuchová [24]	7–5, 6–2
Women's Singles 3rd Round	(Belgium) Kim Clijsters [2]	(Czech Republic) Petra Kvitová [27]	6–3, 6–0
Men's Singles 2nd Round	(United Kingdom) Andy Murray [4]	(Jamaica) Dustin Brown	7–5, 6–3, 6–0
Women's Singles 3rd Round	(United States) Venus Williams [3]	(Luxembourg) Mandy Minella [Q]	6–2, 6–1
Men's Singles 2nd Round	(Spain) Rafael Nadal [1]	(Uzbekistan) Denis Istomin	6–2, 7–6^{(7–5)}, 7–5
Matches on Louis Armstrong Stadium
Event	Winner	Loser	Score
Women's Singles 3rd Round	(Australia) Samantha Stosur [5]	(Italy) Sara Errani	6–2, 6–3
Men's Singles 2nd Round	(United States) John Isner [18]	(Switzerland) Marco Chiudinelli	6–3, 3–6, 7–6^{(9–7)}, 6–4
Women's Singles 3rd Round	(Serbia) Ana Ivanovic	(France) Virginie Razzano [WC]	7–5, 6–0
Men's Singles 2nd Round	(United States) Sam Querrey [20]	(Spain) Marcel Granollers	6–2, 6–3, 6–4
Matches on the Grandstand
Event	Winner	Loser	Score
Men's Singles 2nd Round	(Ukraine) Sergiy Stakhovsky	(United States) Ryan Harrison [Q]	6–3, 5–7, 3–6, 6–3, 7–6^{(8–6)}
Women's Singles 3rd Round	(Italy) Francesca Schiavone [6]	(Ukraine) Alona Bondarenko [29]	6–1, 7–5
Men's Singles 2nd Round	(Argentina) David Nalbandian [31/PR]	(France) Florent Serra	7–5, 6–4, 6–2
Colored background indicates a night match

== Day 6 (September 4) ==
- Schedule of play
- Seeds out:
  - Men's Singles: (Spain) Juan Carlos Ferrero [22]
  - Women's Singles: (Serbia) Jelena Janković [4], (Russia) Maria Kirilenko [23], (Romania) Alexandra Dulgheru [25]
  - Men's Doubles: (India) Mahesh Bhupathi / (Belarus) Max Mirnyi [4]
  - Mixed Doubles: (Slovenia) Katarina Srebotnik / (Serbia) Nenad Zimonjić [3], (Russia) Elena Vesnina / (Israel) Andy Ram [6]

Matches on main courts
Matches on Arthur Ashe Stadium
Event	Winner	Loser	Score
Women's Singles 3rd Round	(Estonia) Kaia Kanepi [31]	(Serbia) Jelena Janković [4]	6–2, 7–6^{(7–1)}
Women's Singles 3rd Round	(Russia) Maria Sharapova [14]	(United States) Beatrice Capra [WC]	6–0, 6–0
Men's Singles 3rd Round	(Switzerland) Roger Federer [2]	(France) Paul-Henri Mathieu	6–4, 6–3, 6–3
Men's Singles 3rd Round	(Serbia) Novak Djokovic [3]	(United States) James Blake [WC]	6–1, 7–6^{(7–4)}, 6–3
Women's Singles 3rd Round	(Russia) Svetlana Kuznetsova [11]	(Russia) Maria Kirilenko [23]	6–3, 6–4
Matches on Louis Armstrong Stadium
Event	Winner	Loser	Score
Men's Singles 3rd Round	(Sweden) Robin Söderling [5]	(Netherlands) Thiemo de Bakker	6–2, 6–3, 6–3
Women's Singles 3rd Round	(Denmark) Caroline Wozniacki [1]	(Chinese Taipei) Chan Yung-jan	6–1, 6–0
Men's Singles 3rd Round	(United States) Mardy Fish [19]	(France) Arnaud Clément	4–6, 6–3, 6–4, 1–6, 6–3
Women's Singles 3rd Round	(Russia) Vera Zvonareva [7]	(Romania) Alexandra Dulgheru [25]	6–2, 7–6^{(7–2)}
Matches on the Grandstand
Event	Winner	Loser	Score
Men's Singles 3rd Round	(France) Gaël Monfils [17]	(Serbia) Janko Tipsarević	7–6^{(7–4)}, 6–7^{(4–7)}, 6–2, 6–4
Women's Singles 3rd Round	(Belgium) Yanina Wickmayer [15]	(Switzerland) Patty Schnyder	7–6^{(7–5)}, 3–6, 7–6^{(8–6)}
Men's Singles 3rd Round	(Austria) Jürgen Melzer [13]	(Spain) Juan Carlos Ferrero [22]	7–5, 6–3, 6–1
Mixed Doubles 2nd Round	(United States) Liezel Huber [1] (United States) Bob Bryan [1]	(United States) Melanie Oudin (United States) Ryan Harrison	5–7, 6–1, [10–3]
Colored background indicates a night match

== Day 7 (September 5) ==
- Schedule of Play
- Seeds out:
  - Men's Singles: (United Kingdom) Andy Murray [4], (Spain) Nicolás Almagro [14], (United States) John Isner [18], (Argentina) David Nalbandian [31]
  - Women's Singles: (Russia) Elena Dementieva [12], (Israel) Shahar Pe'er [16], (Russia) Anastasia Pavlyuchenkova [20]
  - Men's Doubles: (Canada) Daniel Nestor / (Serbia) Nenad Zimonjić [2]
  - Women's Doubles: (Russia) Maria Kirilenko / (Poland) Agnieszka Radwańska [10], (Czech Republic) Iveta Benešová / (Czech Republic) Barbora Záhlavová-Strýcová [12]

Matches on main courts
Matches on Arthur Ashe Stadium
Event	Winner	Loser	Score
Women's Singles 4th Round	(Belgium) Kim Clijsters [2]	(Serbia) Ana Ivanovic	6–2, 6–1
Women's Singles 4th Round	(United States) Venus Williams [3]	(Israel) Shahar Pe'er [16]	7–6^{(7–3)}, 6–3
Men's Singles 3rd Round	(Spain) Rafael Nadal [1]	(France) Gilles Simon	6–4, 6–4, 6–2
Men's Singles 3rd Round	(Russia) Mikhail Youzhny [12]	(United States) John Isner [18]	6–4, 6–7^{(3–7)}, 7–6^{(7–4)}, 6–4
Women's Singles 4th Round	(Australia) Samantha Stosur [5]	(Russia) Elena Dementieva [12]	6–3, 2–6, 7–6^{(7–2)}
Matches on Louis Armstrong Stadium
Event	Winner	Loser	Score
Women's Singles 4th Round	(Italy) Francesca Schiavone [6]	(Russia) Anastasia Pavlyuchenkova [20]	6–3, 6–0
Men's Singles 3rd Round	(United States) Sam Querrey [20]	(Spain) Nicolás Almagro [14]	6–3, 6–4, 6–4
Men's Singles 3rd Round	(Switzerland) Stanislas Wawrinka [25]	(United Kingdom) Andy Murray [4]	6–7^{(3–7)}, 7–6^{(7–4)}, 6–3, 6–3
Women's Doubles 3rd Round	(United States) Liezel Huber [2] (Russia) Nadia Petrova [2]	(Switzerland) Timea Bacsinszky (Italy) Tathiana Garbin	6–3, 6–3
Matches on the Grandstand
Event	Winner	Loser	Score
Men's Singles 3rd Round	(Spain) Fernando Verdasco [8]	(Argentina) David Nalbandian [31]	6–2, 3–6, 6–3, 6–2
Men's Singles 3rd Round	(Spain) Feliciano López [23]	(Ukraine) Sergiy Stakhovsky	6–3, 4–0, retired
Men's Singles 3rd Round	(Spain) Tommy Robredo	(France) Michaël Llodra	3–6, 7–6, 6–4, 2–1, retired
Colored background indicates a night match

== Day 8 (September 6) ==
- Schedule of Play
- Seeds out:
  - Men's Singles: (Austria) Jürgen Melzer [13], (United States) Mardy Fish [19], (Spain) Albert Montañés [21]
  - Women's Singles: (Russia) Svetlana Kuznetsova [11], (Russia) Maria Sharapova [14], (Belgium) Yanina Wickmayer [15]
  - Men's Doubles: (Sweden) Robert Lindstedt / (Romania) Horia Tecău [13], (United States) Mardy Fish / (The Bahamas) Mark Knowles [15]
  - Women's Doubles: (Czech Republic) Květa Peschke / (Slovenia) Katarina Srebotnik [4], (Romania) Monica Niculescu / (Israel) Shahar Pe'er [13]
  - Mixed Doubles: (Zimbabwe) Cara Black / (India) Leander Paes [2], (United States) Lisa Raymond / (South Africa) Wesley Moodie [7]

Matches on main courts
Matches on Arthur Ashe Stadium
Event	Winner	Loser	Score
Women's Singles 4th Round	(Slovakia) Dominika Cibulková	(Russia) Svetlana Kuznetsova [11]	7–5, 7–6^{(7–4)}
Men's Singles 4th Round	(Serbia) Novak Djokovic [3]	(United States) Mardy Fish [19]	6–3, 6–4, 6–1
Women's Singles 4th Round	(Denmark) Caroline Wozniacki [1]	(Russia) Maria Sharapova [14]	6–3, 6–4
Women's Singles 4th Round	(Russia) Vera Zvonareva [7]	(Germany) Andrea Petkovic	6–1, 6–2
Men's Singles 4th Round	(Switzerland) Roger Federer [2]	(Austria) Jürgen Melzer [13]	6–3, 7–6^{(7–4)}, 6–3
Matches on Louis Armstrong Stadium
Event	Winner	Loser	Score
Men's Singles 4th Round	(France) Gaël Monfils [17]	(France) Richard Gasquet	6–4, 7–5, 7–5
Women's Singles 4th Round	(Estonia) Kaia Kanepi [31]	(Belgium) Yanina Wickmayer [15]	0–6, 7–6^{(7–2)}, 6–1
Men's Singles 4th Round	(Sweden) Robin Söderling [5]	(Spain) Albert Montañés [21]	4–6, 6–3, 6–2, 6–3
Matches on the Grandstand
Event	Winner	Loser	Score
Women's Doubles 3rd Round	(Argentina) Gisela Dulko [1] (Italy) Flavia Pennetta [1]	(Romania) Monica Niculescu [13] (Israel) Shahar Pe'er [13]	6–7^{(7–9)}, 6–1, 6–2
Men's Doubles 3rd Round	(Argentina) Eduardo Schwank (Argentina) Horacio Zeballos	(Sweden) Robert Lindstedt [13] (Romania) Horia Tecău [13]	7–6^{(7–3)}, 3–6, 6–3
Women's Doubles 3rd Round	(Zimbabwe) Cara Black [9] (Australia) Anastasia Rodionova [9]	(Germany) Julia Görges (Germany) Anna-Lena Grönefeld	2–6, 6–4, 6–2
Men's Doubles 3rd Round	(United States) Bob Bryan [1] (United States) Mike Bryan [1]	(United States) Mardy Fish [15] (The Bahamas) Mark Knowles [15]	7–5, 6–3
Mixed Doubles Quarterfinals	(United States) Liezel Huber [1] (United States) Bob Bryan [1]	(United States) Lisa Raymond [7] (South Africa) Wesley Moodie [7]	6–4, 7–6^{(7–3)}
Colored background indicates a night match

== Day 9 (September 7) ==
- Schedule of Play
- Seeds out:
  - Men's Singles: (Spain) David Ferrer [10], (Spain) Feliciano López [23], (United States) Sam Querrey [20]
  - Women's Singles: (Italy) Francesca Schiavone [6], (Australia) Samantha Stosur [5]
  - Men's Doubles: (Poland) Łukasz Kubot / (Austria) Oliver Marach [5], (Poland) Mariusz Fyrstenberg / (Poland) Marcin Matkowski [9], (South Africa) Wesley Moodie / (Belgium) Dick Norman [10], (Sweden) Simon Aspelin / (Australia) Paul Hanley [14]
  - Women's Doubles: (Argentina) Gisela Dulko / (Italy) Flavia Pennetta [1], (Russia) Elena Vesnina / (Russia) Vera Zvonareva [14]

Matches on main courts
Matches on Arthur Ashe Stadium
Event	Winner	Loser	Score
Men's Doubles Quarterfinals	(Argentina) Eduardo Schwank (Argentina) Horacio Zeballos	(Poland) Łukasz Kubot [5] (Austria) Oliver Marach [5]	6–3, 7–6^{(7–3)}
Men's Singles 4th Round	(Switzerland) Stanislas Wawrinka [25]	(United States) Sam Querrey [20]	7–6^{(11–9)}, 6–7^{(5–7)}, 7–5, 4–6, 6–4
Women's Singles Quarterfinals	(United States) Venus Williams [3]	(Italy) Francesca Schiavone [6]	7–6^{(7–5)}, 6–4
Women's Singles Quarterfinals	(Belgium) Kim Clijsters [2]	(Australia) Samantha Stosur [5]	6–4, 5–7, 6–3
Men's Singles 4th Round	(Spain) Rafael Nadal [1]	(Spain) Feliciano López [23]	6–3, 6–4, 6–4
Matches on Louis Armstrong Stadium
Event	Winner	Loser	Score
Men's Singles 4th Round	(Russia) Mikhail Youzhny [12]	(Spain) Tommy Robredo	7–5, 6–2, 4–6, 6–4
Women's Doubles Quarterfinals	(United States) Vania King [6] (Kazakhstan) Yaroslava Shvedova [6]	(Argentina) Gisela Dulko [1] (Italy) Flavia Pennetta [1]	6–3, 6–3
Men's Doubles Quarterfinals	(United States) Bob Bryan [1] (United States) Mike Bryan [1]	(Poland) Mariusz Fyrstenberg [9] (Poland) Marcin Matkowski [9]	6–3, 7–5
Men's Singles 4th Round	(Spain) Fernando Verdasco [8]	(Spain) David Ferrer [10]	5–7, 6–7^{(8–10)}, 6–3, 6–3, 7–6^{(7–4)}
Colored background indicates a night match

== Day 10 (September 8) ==
- Schedule of Play
- Seeds out:
  - Men's Singles: (Sweden) Robin Söderling [5], (France) Gaël Monfils [17]
  - Women's Singles: (Estonia) Kaia Kanepi [31]
  - Men's Doubles: (Spain) Marcel Granollers / (Spain) Tommy Robredo [12]
  - Women's Doubles: (United States) Lisa Raymond / (Australia) Rennae Stubbs [5], (United States) Bethanie Mattek-Sands / (United States) Meghann Shaughnessy [15]
  - Mixed Doubles: (United States) Bethanie Mattek-Sands / (Canada) Daniel Nestor [4]

Matches on main courts
Matches on Arthur Ashe Stadium
Event	Winner	Loser	Score
Women's Doubles Quarterfinals	(United States) Liezel Huber [2] (Russia) Nadia Petrova [2]	(United States) Lisa Raymond [5] (Australia) Rennae Stubbs [5]	6–4, 3–6, 7–5
Women's Singles Quarterfinals	(Russia) Vera Zvonareva [7]	(Estonia) Kaia Kanepi [31]	6–3, 7–5
Men's Singles Quarterfinals	(Serbia) Novak Djokovic [3]	(France) Gaël Monfils [17]	7–6^{(7–2)}, 6–1, 6–2
Women's Singles Quarterfinals	(Denmark) Caroline Wozniacki [1]	(Slovakia) Dominika Cibulková	6–2, 7–5
Men's Singles Quarterfinals	(Switzerland) Roger Federer [2]	(Sweden) Robin Söderling [5]	6–4, 6–4, 7–5
Matches on Louis Armstrong Stadium
Event	Winner	Loser	Score
Women's Doubles Quarterfinals	(Chinese Taipei) Chan Yung-jan [7] (China) Zheng Jie [7]	(United States) Bethanie Mattek-Sands [15] (United States) Meghann Shaughnessy [15]	6–4, 6–4
Men's Doubles Semifinals	(United States) Bob Bryan [1] (United States) Mike Bryan [1]	(Spain) Marcel Granollers [12] (Spain) Tommy Robredo [12]	6–1, 6–4
Men's Doubles Semifinals	(India) Rohan Bopanna [16] (Pakistan) Aisam-ul-Haq Qureshi [16]	(Argentina) Eduardo Schwank (Argentina) Horacio Zeballos	7–6^{(7–5)}, 6–4
Mixed Doubles Semifinals	(United States) Liezel Huber [1] (United States) Bob Bryan [1]	(United States) Bethanie Mattek-Sands [4] (Canada) Daniel Nestor [4]	6–3, 7–5
Colored background indicates a night match

== Day 11 (September 9) ==
- Schedule of Play
- Seeds out:
  - Men's Singles: (Spain) Fernando Verdasco [8], (Switzerland) Stanislas Wawrinka [25]
  - Women's Doubles: (Zimbabwe) Cara Black / (Australia) Anastasia Rodionova [9]

Matches on main courts
Matches on Arthur Ashe Stadium
Event	Winner	Loser	Score
Women's Doubles Semifinals	(United States) Vania King [6] (Kazakhstan) Yaroslava Shvedova [6]	(Zimbabwe) Cara Black [9] (Australia) Anastasia Rodionova [9]	6–3, 4–6, 6–4
Mixed Doubles Final	(United States) Liezel Huber [1] (United States) Bob Bryan [1]	(Czech Republic) Květa Peschke (Pakistan) Aisam-ul-Haq Qureshi	6–4, 6–4
Men's Singles Quarterfinals	(Russia) Mikhail Youzhny [12]	(Switzerland) Stanislas Wawrinka [25]	3–6, 7–6^{(9–7)}, 3–6, 6–3, 6–3
Men's Singles Quarterfinals	(Spain) Rafael Nadal [1]	(Spain) Fernando Verdasco [8]	7–5, 6–3, 6–4
Colored background indicates a night match

== Day 12 (September 10) ==
- Seeds out:
  - Women's Singles: (Denmark) Caroline Wozniacki [1], (United States) Venus Williams [3]
  - Men's Doubles: (India) Rohan Bopanna / (Pakistan) Aisam-ul-Haq Qureshi [16]
  - Women's Doubles: (Chinese Taipei) Chan Yung-jan / (China) Zheng Jie [7]
- Schedule of Play

Matches on main courts
Matches on Arthur Ashe Stadium
Event	Winner	Loser	Score
Men's Doubles Final	(United States) Bob Bryan [1] (United States) Mike Bryan [1]	(India) Rohan Bopanna [16] (Pakistan) Aisam-ul-Haq Qureshi [16]	7–6^{(7–5)}, 7–6^{(7–4)}
Women's Singles Semifinals	(Russia) Vera Zvonareva [7]	(Denmark) Caroline Wozniacki [1]	6–4, 6–3
Women's Singles Semifinals	(Belgium) Kim Clijsters [2]	(United States) Venus Williams [3]	4–6, 7–6^{(7–2)}, 6–4
Matches on Louis Armstrong Stadium
Event	Winner	Loser	Score
Women's Doubles Semifinal	(United States) Liezel Huber [2] (Russia) Nadia Petrova [2]	(Chinese Taipei) Chan Yung-jan [7] (China) Zheng Jie [7]	6–3, 6–2
Wheelchair Quad Singles	(United States) David Wagner [1]	(Sweden) Johan Andersson	6–1, 6–4
Boys' Singles Quarterfinals	(United States) Denis Kudla [10]	(Slovakia) Filip Horanský	7–5, 6–1

== Day 13 (September 11) ==
- Seeds out:
  - Men's Singles: (Switzerland) Roger Federer [2], (Russia) Mikhail Youzhny [12]
  - Women's Singles: (Russia) Vera Zvonareva [7]
- Schedule of Play

Matches on main courts
Matches on Arthur Ashe Stadium
Event	Winner	Loser	Score
Men's Singles Semifinals	(Spain) Rafael Nadal [1]	(Russia) Mikhail Youzhny [12]	6–2, 6–3, 6–4
Men's Singles Semifinals	(Serbia) Novak Djokovic [3]	(Switzerland) Roger Federer [2]	5–7, 6–1, 5–7, 6–2, 7–5
Women's Singles Finals	(Belgium) Kim Clijsters [2]	(Russia) Vera Zvonareva [7]	6–2, 6–1
Colored background indicates a night match

== Day 14 (September 12) ==
Some matches had put off to an additional unscheduled Day 15 due to inclement weather.

- Schedule of play

Matches on main courts
Matches on Arthur Ashe Stadium
Event	Winner	Loser	Score
Men's Singles Final	(Spain) Rafael Nadal [1] vs (Serbia) Novak Djokovic [3]		Postponed
Matches on Louis Armstrong Stadium
Event	Winner	Loser	Score
Women's Doubles Final	(United States) Vania King / (Kazakhstan) Yaroslava Shvedova [6] vs (United States) Liezel Huber / (Russia) Nadia Petrova [2]		2–6, 6–4, 4–5, suspended

== Day 15 (September 13) ==
- Seeds out:
  - Men's Singles: (Serbia) Novak Djokovic [3]
  - Women's Doubles: (United States) Liezel Huber / (Russia) Nadia Petrova [2]
- Schedule of play

Matches on main courts
Matches on Arthur Ashe Stadium
Event	Winner	Loser	Score
Women's Doubles Final	(United States) Vania King [6] (Kazakhstan) Yaroslava Shvedova [6]	(United States) Liezel Huber [2] (Russia) Nadia Petrova [2]	2–6, 6–4, 7–6^{(7–4)}
Men's Singles Final	(Spain) Rafael Nadal [1]	(Serbia) Novak Djokovic [3]	6–4, 5–7, 6–4, 6–2
