= 2011 RBC Bank Women's Challenger – Singles =

Singles
- 2011 RBC Bank Women's Challenger

Final
- Champions: (Slovenia) Petra Rampre
- Runners-up: (Italy) Camila Giorgi
- Score: 6–3, 6–2

Events
Singles	Doubles
← 2010 ·	RBC Bank Women's Challenger	· 2012 →

The 2011 RBC Bank Women's Challenger was a tennis tournament in Raleigh, North Carolina. Johanna Konta was the defending champion but chose not to participate.

Petra Rampre defeated Camila Giorgi in the final 6–3, 6–2.

== Seeds ==
1. (Portugal) Michelle Larcher de Brito (first round)
2. (United States) Julia Cohen (first round)
3. (Ukraine) Tetiana Luzhanska (first round)
4. (United States) Alexa Glatch (quarterfinals)
5. (United States) Alexandra Stevenson (first round, retired)
6. (Italy) Camila Giorgi (final)
7. (United States) Ashley Weinhold (first round)
8. (United States) Julie Ditty (first round)

== Draw ==
=== Key ===
- Q = Qualifier
- WC = Wild card
- LL = Lucky loser
- Alt = Alternate
- SE = Special exempt
- PR = Protected ranking
- ITF = ITF entry
- JE = Junior exempt
- w/o = Walkover
- r = Retired
- d = Defaulted
- SR = Special ranking

=== Finals ===
Semifinals
Q	(Canada) Marie-Ève Pelletier	1	6^{4}
6	(Italy) Camila Giorgi	6	7
(Slovenia) Petra Rampre	6	6
(United States) Julia Boserup	2	0

Final
6	(Italy) Camila Giorgi	3	2
(Slovenia) Petra Rampre	6	6

=== Top half ===
First round
1	(Portugal) M Larcher de Brito	7	1	6^{2}
Q	(Canada) M-È Pelletier	5	6	7
Q	(United States) A Mueller	6	6
(United Kingdom) M South	1	4
(Russia) V Solovieva	7	6
(Bolivia) MF Álvarez Terán	6^{7}	1
Q	(United States) Y Schnack	7	6
7	(United States) A Weinhold	5	4
4	(United States) A Glatch	6	6
Q	(United States) J Pegula	3	1
(Brazil) V Segnini	0	1
(Canada) S Fichman	6	6
(United States) A Fink	2	2
(Ukraine) I Buryachok	6	6
(Brazil) MF Alves	2	2
6	(Italy) C Giorgi	6	6

Second round
Q	(Canada) M-È Pelletier	6	6
Q	(United States) A Mueller	4	2
(Russia) V Solovieva	2	6	6
Q	(United States) Y Schnack	6	3	3
4	(United States) A Glatch	3	6	6
(Canada) S Fichman	6	1	2
(Ukraine) I Buryachok	5	1
6	(Italy) C Giorgi	7	6

Quarterfinals
Q	(Canada) M-È Pelletier	6	7
(Russia) V Solovieva	1	6^{4}
4	(United States) A Glatch	6	6^{6}	4
6	(Italy) C Giorgi	4	7	6

Semifinals
Q	(Canada) M-È Pelletier	1	6^{4}
6	(Italy) C Giorgi	6	7

=== Bottom half ===
First round
5	(United States) A Stevenson	6	1	0^{r}
(Slovenia) P Rampre	3	6	3
WC	(United States) C-y Hsu	4	2
(Hungary) T Babos	6	6
(Belgium) T Hendler	6^{3}	6	6
WC	(United States) L Litvak	7	1	4
WC	(United States) A Muhammed	6	3	6
3	(Ukraine) T Luzhanska	2	6	4
8	(United States) J Ditty	6^{3}	2
(United States) S Rogers	7	6
LL	(United States) A King	6	6
WC	(United States) S Kalhorn	0	1
(United States) J Boserup	6	6
(United States) J Elie	2	2
(United States) B Capra	6	6
2	(United States) J Cohen	1	1

Second round
(Slovenia) P Rampre	6	6
(Hungary) T Babos	4	2
(Belgium) T Hendler	7	2	4
WC	(United States) A Muhammed	5	6	6
(United States) S Rogers	7	6
(United States) A King	5	3
(United States) J Boserup	6	6
(United States) B Capra	2	0

Quarterfinals
(Slovenia) P Rampre	6	4	7
WC	(United States) A Muhammed	2	6	5
(United States) S Rogers	6	2	3
(United States) J Boserup	2	6	6

Semifinals
(Slovenia) P Rampre	6	6
(United States) J Boserup	2	0
