= Mary Gambale =

American tennis player

- Country (sports): United States
- Born: December 18, 1988 (age 37) Winchester, Massachusetts
- Height: 5 ft 4 in (163 cm)
- Plays: Right-handed
- Prize money: $67,812

Singles
- Career record: 77–76
- Highest ranking: No. 226 (October 17, 2005)

Grand Slam singles results
- French Open: Q2 (2005)
- US Open: 1R (2005)

Doubles
- Career record: 19–43
- Career titles: 1 ITF
- Highest ranking: No. 403 (July 17, 2006)

Mary Gambale (born December 18, 1988) is an American former professional tennis player.

Gambale grew up in Winchester, Massachusetts and was coached by her father Bob. She played Junior Fed Cup tennis for the United States and was later used as a hitting partner for the senior team. After winning the USTA Girls 18s National Championships as a 16-year-old in 2005, Gambale received a wildcard into the main draw of that year's US Open, where she was beaten in the first round by Dally Randriantefy.

== ITF finals ==
$75,000 tournaments
$25,000 tournaments
$10,000 tournaments

=== Singles: 1 (0–1) ===
Outcome	No.	Date	Tournament	Surface	Opponent	Score
Runner-up	1.	May 2005	ITF Raleigh, United States	Clay	(Ukraine) Olga Lazarchuk	3–6, 1–6

=== Doubles: 1 (1–1) ===
Outcome	No.	Date	Tournament	Surface	Partner	Opponents	Score
Winner	1.	Jul 2005	ITF Hammond, United States	Hard	(United States) Kelley Hyndman	(United States) Christina Fusano (United States) Ahsha Rolle	2–6, 6–3, 7–5
Runner-up	2.	Oct 2008	ITF Southlake, United States	Hard	(United States) Elizabeth Lumpkin	(United States) Beatrice Capra (Canada) Rebecca Marino	6–3, 4–6, [6–10]
