= 2010 US Open (tennis) =

- Date: August 30 – September 13
- Edition: 130th
- Category: Grand Slam (ITF)
- Surface: Hardcourt
- Location: New York City, U.S.
- Venue: USTA Billie Jean King National Tennis Center

Champions

Men's singles
- (Spain) Rafael Nadal

Women's singles
- (Belgium) Kim Clijsters

Men's doubles
- (United States) Bob Bryan / (United States) Mike Bryan

Women's doubles
- (United States) Vania King / (Kazakhstan) Yaroslava Shvedova

Mixed doubles
- (United States) Liezel Huber / (United States) Bob Bryan

Wheelchair men's singles
- (Japan) Shingo Kunieda

Wheelchair women's singles
- (Netherlands) Esther Vergeer

Wheelchair quad singles
- (United States) David Wagner

Wheelchair men's doubles
- (Netherlands) Maikel Scheffers / (Netherlands) Ronald Vink

Wheelchair women's doubles
- (Netherlands) Esther Vergeer / (Netherlands) Sharon Walraven

Wheelchair quad doubles
- (United States) Nick Taylor / (United States) David Wagner

Boys' singles
- (United States) Jack Sock

Girls' singles
- (Russia) Daria Gavrilova

Boys' doubles
- (Peru) Duilio Beretta / (Ecuador) Roberto Quiroz

Girls' doubles
- (Hungary) Tímea Babos / (United States) Sloane Stephens
- US Open

The 2010 US Open was a tennis tournament played on outdoor hard courts, held from August 30 to September 13, 2010, in the USTA Billie Jean King National Tennis Center at Flushing Meadows, Queens, New York City, United States.

The tournament was initially going to finish with Men's Singles final on September 12, but was postponed due to rain on the last day and just before the men's tournament final. In the previous two years the tournament was also postponed because of weather.

Juan Martín del Potro and Kim Clijsters were the defending champions. Del Potro, due to a wrist injury, opted not to defend his title. Clijsters successfully defended her title with a score of 6–2, 6–1 in the final against Vera Zvonareva.

== Notable stories ==
=== Milestones ===
- Maria Sharapova recorded her 100th Grand Slam match victory with a 6–0, 6–0 defeat of wildcard Beatrice Capra in the third round.
- Kim Clijsters became the first woman since Venus Williams in 2000–1 to successfully defend her US Open title, by defeating Vera Zvonareva in the final. The final lasted just under one hour with Clijsters winning 6–2, 6–1.
- Rafael Nadal defeated Novak Djokovic 6–4, 5–7, 6–4, 6–2 in the men's final, and in doing so, completed his Golden Career Grand Slam.

=== Serena Williams' withdrawal ===
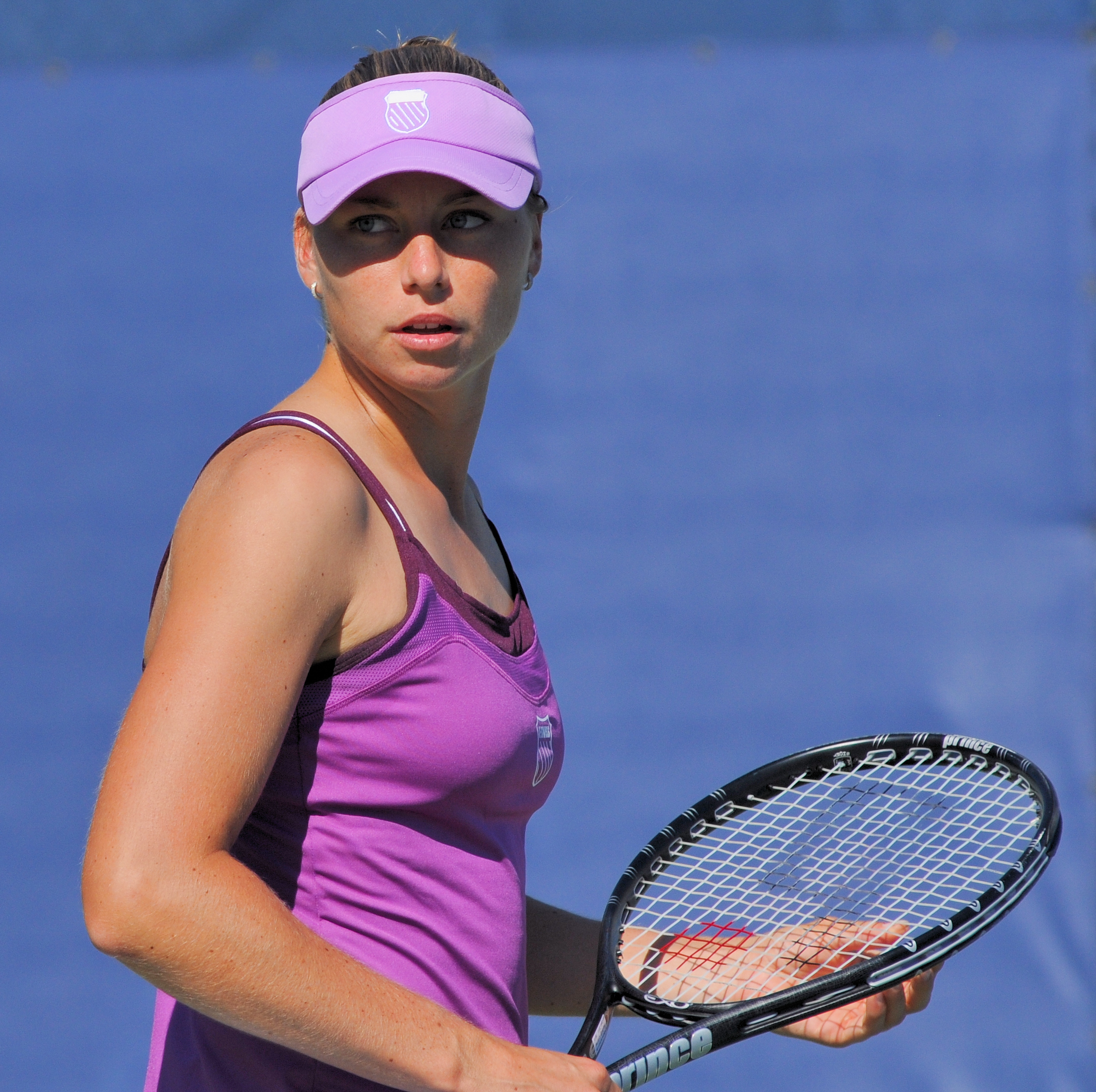
Vera Zvonareva reached her first US Open final by defeating top seed Caroline Wozniacki in the semi-finals.

Three-time champion and World No. 1 Serena Williams officially announced her withdrawal from the US Open on August 20 due to foot surgery. Her withdrawal also meant that she and older sister Venus could not pair up to defend the doubles title they won in 2009, and allowed WTA No. 2 Caroline Wozniacki to be installed as the top seed for the tournament, where she was defeated in the semi-finals by Vera Zvonareva. It was the first time since 2003 in which Serena Williams was forced to miss her national championships due to injury, the first Grand Slam tournament she missed through injury since Wimbledon in 2006, the first time since the 2007 Australian Open in which the women's World No. 1 missed a Grand Slam tournament and the first time in the WTA's 35-year rankings history that the World No. 1 missed the US Open.

Other notable withdrawals included two-time champion Justine Henin, as well as men's defending champion Juan Martín del Potro, Tommy Haas, Jo-Wilfried Tsonga, Ivo Karlović and Mario Ančić. Venus Williams, Maria Sharapova, Ana Ivanovic, Kim Clijsters and John Isner had all been in doubt after suffering minor injuries during lead-up tournaments but all were cleared to play.

=== Victoria Azarenka collapses ===
In a second round match played in 104 °F (40 °C) heat, Belarusian 10th seed Victoria Azarenka collapsed whilst trailing Gisela Dulko 1–5 in the first set. Azarenka was subsequently taken to hospital in a wheelchair where she was diagnosed with mild concussion and later released a statement saying that a mishap in the gym, and not the heat, caused her to collapse during the match. Her second round retirement represented her worst ever performance at the US Open, having never previously fallen before the third round. It was also the second time she was forced to retire from a match at a Major, when she retired in near identical circumstances against Serena Williams at the 2009 Australian Open.

=== Spanish performance ===
The men's tournament was well known for the excellent performances of Spanish players. Of the sixteen Spaniards that started in the 128-man draw, six of them reached the fourth round: Rafael Nadal, Fernando Verdasco, Tommy Robredo, David Ferrer, Feliciano López and Albert Montañés. There were two all-Spanish fourth round matches, guaranteeing two Spaniards in the quarter-finals: Nadal vs. López and Ferrer vs. Verdasco (the latter winning in a final set tiebreak). In a rematch of their 2009 Australian Open semi-final, Nadal defeated Verdasco in straight sets in the all-Spanish quarter-final, and went on to become the first Spaniard since Manuel Orantes in 1975 to win the US Open.

== Singles players ==
Men's singles

Champion		Runner-up	
(Spain) Rafael Nadal [1]		(Serbia) Novak Djokovic [3]	
Semifinals out
(Russia) Mikhail Youzhny [12]		(Switzerland) Roger Federer [2]	
Quarterfinals out
(Spain) Fernando Verdasco [8]	(Switzerland) Stan Wawrinka [25]	(France) Gaël Monfils [17]	(Sweden) Robin Söderling [5]
4th round out
(Spain) Feliciano López [23]	(Spain) David Ferrer [10]	(United States) Sam Querrey [20]	(Spain) Tommy Robredo
(France) Richard Gasquet	(United States) Mardy Fish [19]	(Spain) Albert Montañés [21]	(Austria) Jürgen Melzer [13]
3rd round out
(France) Gilles Simon	(Ukraine) Sergiy Stakhovsky	(Spain) Daniel Gimeno Traver	(Argentina) David Nalbandian [31/PR]
(United Kingdom) Andy Murray [4]	(Spain) Nicolás Almagro [14]	(United States) John Isner [18]	(France) Michaël Llodra
(South Africa) Kevin Anderson	(Serbia) Janko Tipsarević	(France) Arnaud Clément	(United States) James Blake (WC)
(Netherlands) Thiemo de Bakker	(Japan) Kei Nishikori (Q)	(Spain) Juan Carlos Ferrero [22]	(France) Paul-Henri Mathieu
2nd round out
(Uzbekistan) Denis Istomin	(Germany) Philipp Kohlschreiber [29]	(France) Benoît Paire (Q)	(United States) Ryan Harrison (Q)
(Germany) Benjamin Becker	(France) Jérémy Chardy	(France) Florent Serra	(France) Adrian Mannarino (Q)
(Jamaica) Dustin Brown	(Argentina) Juan Ignacio Chela	(Spain) Marcel Granollers	(Spain) Guillermo García López
(Israel) Dudi Sela	(Switzerland) Marco Chiudinelli	(France) Julien Benneteau	(Romania) Victor Hănescu
(Russia) Nikolay Davydenko [6]	(Brazil) Thomaz Bellucci [26]	(Russia) Igor Andreev	(United States) Andy Roddick [9]
(Argentina) Eduardo Schwank	(Uruguay) Pablo Cuevas	(Canada) Peter Polansky (Q)	(Germany) Philipp Petzschner
(United States) Taylor Dent	(Croatia) Ivan Dodig (Q)	(Australia) Carsten Ball (WC)	(Croatia) Marin Čilić [11]
(Lithuania) Ričardas Berankis (Q)	(Brazil) Ricardo Mello	(France) Guillaume Rufin (WC)	(Germany) Andreas Beck
1st round out
(Russia) Teymuraz Gabashvili	(Argentina) Máximo González (PR)	(United States) Donald Young (WC)	(Germany) Tobias Kamke
(Colombia) Santiago Giraldo	(Germany) Rainer Schüttler	(Australia) Peter Luczak	(Croatia) Ivan Ljubičić [15]
(Ukraine) Alexandr Dolgopolov	(Germany) Daniel Brands	(Finland) Jarkko Nieminen	(Latvia) Ernests Gulbis [24]
(South Africa) Rik de Voest (Q)	(Germany) Florian Mayer	(Spain) Pere Riba	(Italy) Fabio Fognini
(Slovakia) Lukáš Lacko	(Spain) Rubén Ramírez Hidalgo	(Chinese Taipei) Lu Yen-hsun	(Kazakhstan) Mikhail Kukushkin
(United States) Bradley Klahn (WC)	(Italy) Andreas Seppi	(Poland) Łukasz Kubot	(Italy) Potito Starace
(Kazakhstan) Andrey Golubev	(Belgium) Xavier Malisse	(United States) Jack Sock (WC)	(Portugal) Frederico Gil
(Czech Republic) Radek Štěpánek [28]	(Czech Republic) Lukáš Rosol (Q)	(Argentina) Carlos Berlocq	(Czech Republic) Tomáš Berdych [7]
(United States) Michael Russell	(Germany) Simon Greul	(India) Somdev Devvarman	(United States) Tim Smyczek (WC)
(United States) Robert Kendrick (Q)	(Argentina) Horacio Zeballos	(Belgium) Olivier Rochus	(France) Stéphane Robert
(Cyprus) Marcos Baghdatis [16]	(United States) Robby Ginepri	(Brazil) Júlio Silva (Q)	(Czech Republic) Jan Hájek
(Argentina) Juan Mónaco (30)	(Belgium) Kristof Vliegen (PR)	(Czech Republic) Dušan Lojda (Q)	(Serbia) Viktor Troicki
(Austria) Andreas Haider-Maurer (Q)	(Colombia) Alejandro Falla	(France) Marc Gicquel (Q)	(Chile) Fernando González [27]
(Poland) Michał Przysiężny	(Canada) Milos Raonic (Q)	(Kazakhstan) Evgeny Korolev	(Ukraine) Illya Marchenko
(Russia) Dmitry Tursunov (PR)	(United States) Ryan Sweeting (WC)	(Germany) Björn Phau	(Slovakia) Martin Kližan (Q)
(Australia) Lleyton Hewitt [32]	(Argentina) Leonardo Mayer	(Germany) Michael Berrer	(Argentina) Brian Dabul

Women's singles

Champion		Runner-up	
(Belgium) Kim Clijsters [2]		(Russia) Vera Zvonareva [7]	
Semifinals out
(Denmark) Caroline Wozniacki [1]		(United States) Venus Williams [3]	
Quarterfinals out
(Slovakia) Dominika Cibulková	(Estonia) Kaia Kanepi [31]	(Italy) Francesca Schiavone [6]	(Australia) Samantha Stosur [5]
4th round out
(Russia) Maria Sharapova [14]	(Russia) Svetlana Kuznetsova [11]	(Belgium) Yanina Wickmayer [15]	(Germany) Andrea Petkovic
(Russia) Anastasia Pavlyuchenkova [20]	(Israel) Shahar Pe'er [16]	(Russia) Elena Dementieva [12]	(Serbia) Ana Ivanovic
3rd round out
(Chinese Taipei) Chan Yung-jan	(United States) Beatrice Capra (WC)	(Russia) Maria Kirilenko [23]	(Spain) Lourdes Domínguez Lino (Q)
(Serbia) Jelena Janković [4]	(Switzerland) Patty Schnyder	(China) Peng Shuai	(Romania) Alexandra Dulgheru [25]
(Ukraine) Alona Bondarenko [29]	(Argentina) Gisela Dulko	(Italy) Flavia Pennetta [19]	(Luxembourg) Mandy Minella (Q)
(Italy) Sara Errani	(Slovakia) Daniela Hantuchová [24]	(France) Virginie Razzano (WC)	(Czech Republic) Petra Kvitová [27]
2nd round out
(Chinese Taipei) Chang Kai-chen	(Austria) Tamira Paszek (Q)	(France) Aravane Rezaï [18]	(Czech Republic) Iveta Benešová
(Latvia) Anastasija Sevastova	(Austria) Yvonne Meusburger	(Poland) Urszula Radwańska (PR)	(Ukraine) Kateryna Bondarenko
(Croatia) Mirjana Lučić (Q)	(Uzbekistan) Akgul Amanmuradova (Q)	(Spain) María José Martínez Sánchez [22]	(Germany) Julia Görges
(Poland) Agnieszka Radwańska [9]	(United States) Bethanie Mattek-Sands	(Sweden) Sofia Arvidsson	(Germany) Sabine Lisicki
(Italy) Maria Elena Camerin (Q)	(United States) Melanie Oudin	(India) Sania Mirza (Q)	(Belarus) Victoria Azarenka [10]
(France) Pauline Parmentier	(Hungary) Ágnes Szávay	(Bulgaria) Tsvetana Pironkova [32]	(Canada) Rebecca Marino (Q)
(Australia) Anastasia Rodionova	(Russia) Alisa Kleybanova [28]	(United States) Vania King	(Austria) Sybille Bammer
(France) Marion Bartoli [13]	(China) Zheng Jie [21]	(United Kingdom) Elena Baltacha	(Australia) Sally Peers (Q)
1st round out
(United States) Chelsey Gullickson (WC)	(Spain) Carla Suárez Navarro	(United Kingdom) Anne Keothavong (PR)	(Czech Republic) Lucie Šafářová [26]
(Slovakia) Magdaléna Rybáriková	(Croatia) Karolina Šprem	(Spain) Nuria Llagostera Vives (Q)	(Australia) Jarmila Groth
(Japan) Kimiko Date-Krumm	(Russia) Regina Kulikova	(United States) Jill Craybas	(Czech Republic) Barbora Záhlavová-Strýcová
(Kazakhstan) Yaroslava Shvedova [30]	(Russia) Anna Chakvetadze	(Switzerland) Stefanie Vögele	(China) Li Na [8]
(Romania) Simona Halep	(Australia) Alicia Molik	(South Africa) Chanelle Scheepers	(France) Alizé Cornet
(United States) Jamie Hampton (WC)	(Belgium) Kirsten Flipkens	(Italy) Romina Oprandi	(Russia) Alla Kudryavtseva
(Spain) Arantxa Parra Santonja	(United States) Shelby Rogers (WC)	(Spain) Anabel Medina Garrigues	(Russia) Nadia Petrova [17]
(France) Julie Coin	(Romania) Sorana Cîrstea	(United States) CoCo Vandeweghe (WC)	(Slovakia) Zuzana Kučová (Q)
(Japan) Ayumi Morita	(Australia) Sophie Ferguson (WC)	(Ukraine) Olga Savchuk (Q)	(Russia) Vera Dushevina
(Germany) Kristina Barrois	(Portugal) Michelle Larcher de Brito (Q)	(Germany) Angelique Kerber	(Romania) Monica Niculescu (Q)
(Croatia) Jelena Kostanić Tošić (PR)	(Italy) Alberta Brianti	(Czech Republic) Sandra Záhlavová	(United States) Irina Falconi (Q)
(Czech Republic) Renata Voráčová	(Slovenia) Polona Hercog	(Russia) Ksenia Pervak	(Italy) Roberta Vinci
(Russia) Elena Vesnina	(Serbia) Bojana Jovanovski	(Italy) Tathiana Garbin	(Sweden) Johanna Larsson
(Russia) Dinara Safina	(United States) Christina McHale (WC)	(Czech Republic) Zuzana Ondrášková (Q)	(Belarus) Olga Govortsova
(Romania) Edina Gallovits	(Czech Republic) Klára Zakopalová	(Russia) Ekaterina Makarova	(Switzerland) Timea Bacsinszky
(Czech Republic) Lucie Hradecká	(Croatia) Petra Martić	(Canada) Aleksandra Wozniak	(Hungary) Gréta Arn

== Player(s) of the day ==
- Day 1: (United States) Andy Roddick – Roddick advanced to the second round of the US Open with a 6–3, 6–2, 6–2 victory over (France) Stéphane Robert on his 28th birthday.
- Day 2: (United States) Beatrice Capra – The young wild card entrant defeated (Croatia) Karolina Šprem 6–1, 6–3 and advanced to the second round.
- Day 3: (United States) Ryan Harrison – The 18-year-old qualifier ousted 15th-seeded (Croatia) Ivan Ljubičić in a hard-fought match, 6–3, 6–7^{(4–7)}, 6–3, 6–4.
- Day 4: (Japan) Kei Nishikori – The qualifier, and only Japanese player in the men's draw, upset 11th-seeded (Croatia) Marin Čilić in a grueling five-hour match, 5–7, 7–6^{(8–6)}, 3–6, 7–6^{(7–3)}, 6–1.
- Day 5: (Ukraine) Sergiy Stakhovsky – The Pilot Pen champion fought past a rain delay, a partisan crowd, and a determined young opponent to take down (United States) Ryan Harrison, 6–3, 5–7, 3–6, 6–3, 7–6^{(8–6)}.
- Day 6: (Denmark) Caroline Wozniacki – The Pilot Pen champion destroyed (Chinese Taipei) Chan Yung-jan, 6–1, 6–0, maintaining her average of one game lost per match at the tournament as she heads into the Round of 16.
- Day 7: (Italy) Francesca Schiavone – The world #7 defeated (Russia) Anastasia Pavlyuchenkova, 6–3, 6–0 in just 1 hour and 8 minutes to advance into the Quarterfinals.
- Day 8: (Estonia) Kaia Kanepi – Overcame a lopsided start to upset 15th-seeded (Belgium) Yanina Wickmayer, 0–6, 7–6^{(7–2)}, 6–1, reaching her first US Open quarterfinals.
- Day 9: (Switzerland) Stan Wawrinka – Two days after his upset of (United Kingdom) Andy Murray, the Swiss overcame crowd favorite and last American standing (United States) Sam Querrey in a long five-setter, 7–6^{(11–9)}, 6–7^{(5–7)}, 7–5, 4–6, 6–4.
- Day 10: Vera Zvonareva – Russia's top player defeated 31st-seeded (Estonia) Kaia Kanepi, 6–3, 7–5, in gusty conditions for her best-ever US Open showing.
- Day 11: (Russia) Mikhail Youzhny – The big-hitting Russian outlasted (Switzerland) Stan Wawrinka in five sets, 3–6, 7–6^{(9–7)}, 3–6, 6–3, 6–3, to advance to the semifinals.
- Day 12: (United States) Bob Bryan / (United States) Mike Bryan – The American twins won their 9th Grand Slam title and 3rd US Open, defeating (India) Rohan Bopanna / (Pakistan) Aisam-ul-Haq Qureshi 7–6^{(7–5)}, 7–6^{(7–4)}.
- Day 13: (Serbia) Novak Djokovic – The ATP ranked #3 defeated (Switzerland) Roger Federer in a five-set match to reach his first Grand Slam final since he won the 2008 Australian Open.
- Day 14: No matches completed due to rain.
- Day 15: (Spain) Rafael Nadal – The World #1 beat (Serbia) Novak Djokovic to win the US Open for the first time and complete his Career Slam.

== Events ==
=== Men's singles ===
(Spain) Rafael Nadal def. (Serbia) Novak Djokovic, 6–4, 5–7, 6–4, 6–2

- It was Nadal's 6th title of the year and 42nd of his career. It was his 3rd slam of the year, first US Open, and 9th slam of his career.

=== Women's singles ===
(Belgium) Kim Clijsters def. (Russia) Vera Zvonareva, 6–2, 6–1

• It was Clijsters' 4th title of the year and 39th of her career. It was her 3rd career Grand Slam singles title and her 3rd and last at the US Open.

=== Men's doubles ===
(United States) Bob Bryan / (United States) Mike Bryan def. (India) Rohan Bopanna / (Pakistan) Aisam-ul-Haq Qureshi, 7–6^{(7–5)}, 7–6^{(7–4)}.

- It was the Bryan's ninth grand slam men's doubles title for their careers, and the third US Open crown along with 2005 and 2008. This was Bob's 65th title of his career and the 67th title of Mike's career.

=== Women's doubles ===
(United States) Vania King / (Kazakhstan) Yaroslava Shvedova def. (United States) Liezel Huber / (Russia) Nadia Petrova, 2–6, 6–4, 7–6^{(7–4)}

- This was the pair of King and Shvedova second women's grand slam doubles title of the year and of their careers to go along with the 2010 Wimbledon crown. This was King's eleventh women's doubles title of her career and Shvedova's third career women's doubles victory.

=== Mixed doubles ===
(United States) Liezel Huber / (United States) Bob Bryan def. (Czech Republic) Květa Peschke / (Pakistan) Aisam-ul-Haq Qureshi, 6–4, 6–4.

- This victory was the second joint title in a grand slam tournament for the pair of Huber and Bryan, which they won the 2009 French Open together. This was Huber's second mixed double slam, which all were won with Bob, but this was Bob Bryan seventh mixed doubles title for his career. This was the first US Open title for Huber in mixed doubles, but this was Bob's fourth mixed doubles title for his career to go along with titles in 2003, 2004, and 2006.

=== Boys' singles ===
(United States) Jack Sock def. (United States) Denis Kudla, 3–6, 6–2, 6–2

=== Girls' singles ===
(Russia) Daria Gavrilova def. (Russia) Yulia Putintseva, 6–3, 6–2

=== Boys' doubles ===
(Peru) Duilio Beretta / (Ecuador) Roberto Quiroz def. (United Kingdom) Oliver Golding / (Czech Republic) Jiří Veselý, 6–1, 7–5

- It was their second Grand Slam Boys' Doubles title in the year after winning at the French Open.

=== Girls' doubles ===
(Hungary) Tímea Babos / (United States) Sloane Stephens def. (Belgium) An-Sophie Mestach / (Croatia) Silvia Njirić, walkover

- It was their third Grand Slam Girls' Doubles title in the year after winning at the French Open and at the Wimbledon Championships.

=== Wheelchair men's singles ===
(Japan) Shingo Kunieda def. (France) Nicolas Peifer, walkover

=== Wheelchair women's singles ===
(Netherlands) Esther Vergeer def. (Australia) Daniela Di Toro, 6–0, 6–0

=== Wheelchair men's doubles ===
(Netherlands) Maikel Scheffers / (Netherlands) Ronald Vink def. (France) Nicolas Peifer / (United States) Jon Rydberg, 6–0, 6–0

=== Wheelchair women's doubles ===
(Netherlands) Esther Vergeer / (Netherlands) Sharon Walraven def. (Australia) Daniela Di Toro / (Netherlands) Aniek van Koot, 6–3, 6–3

=== Wheelchair quad singles ===
(United States) David Wagner def. (United Kingdom) Peter Norfolk, 6–0, 2–6, 6–3

=== Wheelchair quad doubles ===
(United States) Nick Taylor / (United States) David Wagner def. (Sweden) Johan Andersson / (United Kingdom) Peter Norfolk, 7–5, 7–6^{(7–4)}

== Champions invitational ==
The Champions Invitational returned for the fifth year with 16 former Grand Slam tournament champions and finalists. It was a doubles only event for the first time, but employed the fan-friendly World TeamTennis format for the second consecutive year. Players were divided into four teams of four players each that were named after members of the US Open Court of Champions. All teams played two matches from Wednesday, September 8, through Saturday, September 11. For the first time, prize money was awarded to the competitors based on their team's order of finish.

The invitees for this year's event included a host of past US Open champions, including sixteen-time US Open champion Martina Navratilova, two-time women's singles champion Tracy Austin (1979, 1981) and 1988 men's singles champion Mats Wilander, as well as the Champion Invitational's first "Hall of Fame team": 2010 International Tennis Hall of Fame inductees Gigi Fernández and Natasha Zvereva, who teamed to win three US Open women's doubles titles, and Todd Woodbridge and Mark Woodforde, collectively known as The Woodies, who won back-to-back men's doubles championships in 1995 and 1996.

Also scheduled to compete were U.S. Fed Cup Captain and two-time Grand Slam singles finalist Mary Joe Fernández, 1989 French Open champion Michael Chang, 1987 Wimbledon champion Pat Cash, 1997 French Open champion Iva Majoli, 1996 Wimbledon runner-up MaliVai Washington and 1999 US Open finalist Todd Martin.

=== Teams ===
Team Connolly

- Gigi Fernández
- Todd Woodbridge
- Mark Woodforde
- Natasha Zvereva

Team Gibson

- MaliVai Washington
- Mary Joe Fernández
- Todd Martin
- Tracy Austin

Team Kramer

- Pat Cash
- Martina Navratilova
- Chanda Rubin
- Michael Chang

Team Tilden

- Iva Majoli
- Conchita Martínez
- Cédric Pioline
- Mats Wilander

=== Results ===
Date	Winner	Loser	Score
September 8	Team Connolly	Team Tilden	15–10
September 9	Team Kramer	Team Gibson	14–11
September 11	Team Tilden	Team Gibson	14–11
September 11	Team Connolly	Team Kramer	14–9

== Singles seeds ==
The following are the seeded players and notable players who withdrew from the event. Seedings based on ATP and WTA rankings as of August 23, 2010. Rankings and points were before as of August 30, 2010.

=== Men's singles ===
Seed	Rank	Player	Points before	Points defending	Points won	Points after	Status
1	1	(Spain) Rafael Nadal	10,745	720	2,000	12,025	Champion, defeated (Serbia) Novak Djokovic [3]
2	2	(Switzerland) Roger Federer	7,215	1,200	720	6,735	Semifinals lost to (Serbia) Novak Djokovic [3]
3	3	(Serbia) Novak Djokovic	6,665	720	1,200	7,145	Runner-up, lost to (Spain) Rafael Nadal [1]
4	4	(United Kingdom) Andy Murray	5,125	180	90	5,035	Third round lost to (Switzerland) Stan Wawrinka [25]
5	5	(Sweden) Robin Söderling	4,910	360	360	4,910	Quarterfinals lost to (Switzerland) Roger Federer [2]
6	6	(Russia) Nikolay Davydenko	4,285	180	45	4,150	Second round lost to (France) Richard Gasquet
7	7	(Czech Republic) Tomáš Berdych	3,860	90	10	3,780	First round lost to (France) Michaël Llodra
8	8	(Spain) Fernando Verdasco	3,330	360	360	3,330	Quarterfinals lost to (Spain) Rafael Nadal [1]
9	9	(United States) Andy Roddick	3,225	90	45	3,180	Second round lost to (Serbia) Janko Tipsarević
10	12	(Spain) David Ferrer	3,065	45	180	3,200	Fourth round lost to (Spain) Fernando Verdasco [8]
11	13	(Croatia) Marin Čilić	2,855	360	45	2,540	Second round lost to (Japan) Kei Nishikori [Q]
12	14	(Russia) Mikhail Youzhny	2,620	45	720	3,295	Semifinals lost to (Spain) Rafael Nadal [1]
13	15	(Austria) Jürgen Melzer	2,470	45	180	2,605	Fourth round lost to (Switzerland) Roger Federer [2]
14	16	(Spain) Nicolás Almagro	2,150	90	90	2,150	Third round lost to (United States) Sam Querrey [20]
15	17	(Croatia) Ivan Ljubičić	2,120	10	10	2,120	First round lost to (United States) Ryan Harrison [Q]
16	18	(Cyprus) Marcos Baghdatis	2,095	75	10	2,030	First round lost to (France) Arnaud Clément
17	19	(France) Gaël Monfils	2,070	180	360	2,250	Quarterfinals lost to (Serbia) Novak Djokovic [3]
18	20	(United States) John Isner	1,805	180	90	1,715	Third round lost to (Russia) Mikhail Youzhny [12]
19	21	(United States) Mardy Fish	1,751	0	180	1,931	Fourth round lost to (Serbia) Novak Djokovic [3]
20	22	(United States) Sam Querrey	1,705	90	180	1,795	Fourth round lost to (Switzerland) Stan Wawrinka [25]
21	23	(Spain) Albert Montañés	1,600	10	180	1,770	Fourth round lost to (Sweden) Robin Söderling [5]
22	24	(Spain) Juan Carlos Ferrero	1,560	180	90	1,470	Third round lost to (Austria) Jürgen Melzer [13]
23	25	(Spain) Feliciano López	1,515	10	180	1,685	Fourth round lost to (Spain) Rafael Nadal [1]
24	26	(Latvia) Ernests Gulbis	1,515	10	10	1,515	First round lost to (France) Jérémy Chardy
25	27	(Switzerland) Stan Wawrinka	1,510	10	360	1,860	Quarterfinals lost to (Russia) Mikhail Youzhny [12]
26	28	(Brazil) Thomaz Bellucci	1,480	70	45	1,455	Second round lost to (South Africa) Kevin Anderson
27	29	(Chile) Fernando González	1,340	360	10	990	First round retired against (Croatia) Ivan Dodig [Q]
28	30	(Czech Republic) Radek Štěpánek	1,320	180	10	1,150	First round lost to (France) Julien Benneteau
29	31	(Germany) Philipp Kohlschreiber	1,315	90	45	1,270	Second round lost to (France) Gilles Simon
30	32	(Argentina) Juan Mónaco	1,235	10	10	1,235	First round lost to (Canada) Peter Polansky [Q]
31	33	(Argentina) David Nalbandian	1,235	0	90	1,325	Third round lost to (Spain) Fernando Verdasco [8]
32	34	(Australia) Lleyton Hewitt	1,215	90	10	1,135	First round lost to (France) Paul-Henri Mathieu

The following players would have been seeded, but they withdrew from the event.

Rank	Player	Points before	Points defending	Points after	Withdrawal reason
10	(Argentina) Juan Martín del Potro	3,170	2,000	1,170	Right wrist injury
11	(France) Jo-Wilfried Tsonga	3,085	180	2,905	Knee injury

=== Women's singles ===
Seed	Rank	Player	Points before	Points defending	Points won	Points after	Status
1	2	(Denmark) Caroline Wozniacki	6,410	1,400	900	5,910	Semifinals lost to (Russia) Vera Zvonareva [7]
2	3	(Belgium) Kim Clijsters	5,325	2,000	2,000	5,325	Champion, defeated (Russia) Vera Zvonareva [7]
3	4	(United States) Venus Williams	5,176	280	900	5,796	Semifinals lost to (Belgium) Kim Clijsters [2]
4	5	(Serbia) Jelena Janković	5,145	100	160	5,205	Third round lost to (Estonia) Kaia Kanepi [31]
5	6	(Australia) Samantha Stosur	4,550	100	500	4,950	Quarterfinals lost to (Belgium) Kim Clijsters [2]
6	7	(Italy) Francesca Schiavone	4,450	280	500	4,670	Quarterfinals lost to (United States) Venus Williams [3]
7	8	(Russia) Vera Zvonareva	4,430	280	1,400	5,550	Runner-up, lost to (Belgium) Kim Clijsters [2]
8	9	(China) Li Na	4,015	500	5	3,520	First round lost to (Ukraine) Kateryna Bondarenko
9	10	(Poland) Agnieszka Radwańska	3,995	100	100	3,995	Second round lost to (China) Peng Shuai
10	11	(Belarus) Victoria Azarenka	3,775	160	100	3,715	Second round retired against (Argentina) Gisela Dulko
11	13	(Russia) Svetlana Kuznetsova	3,516	280	280	3,516	Fourth round lost to (Slovakia) Dominika Cibulková
12	12	(Russia) Elena Dementieva	3,765	100	280	3,945	Fourth round lost to (Australia) Samantha Stosur [5]
13	14	(France) Marion Bartoli	3,455	100	100	3,455	Second round lost to (France) Virginie Razzano
14	17	(Russia) Maria Sharapova	3,330	160	280	3,450	Fourth round lost to (Denmark) Caroline Wozniacki [1]
15	18	(Belgium) Yanina Wickmayer	3,310	900	280	2,690	Fourth round lost to (Estonia) Kaia Kanepi [31]
16	19	(Israel) Shahar Pe'er	3,175	160	280	3,295	Fourth round lost to (United States) Venus Williams [3]
17	16	(Russia) Nadia Petrova	3,345	280	5	3,070	First round lost to (Germany) Andrea Petkovic
18	20	(France) Aravane Rezaï	3,005	5	100	3,100	Second round lost to (United States) Beatrice Capra [WC]
19	21	(Italy) Flavia Pennetta	2,905	500	160	2,565	Third round lost to (Israel) Shahar Pe'er [16]
20	22	(Russia) Anastasia Pavlyuchenkova	2,505	5	280	2,780	Fourth round lost to (Italy) Francesca Schiavone [6]
21	23	(China) Zheng Jie	2,351	160	100	2,291	Second round lost to (Serbia) Ana Ivanovic
22	24	(Spain) María José Martínez Sánchez	2,285	160	100	2,225	Second round lost to (Switzerland) Patty Schnyder
23	25	(Russia) Maria Kirilenko	2,275	160	160	2,275	Third round lost to (Russia) Svetlana Kuznetsova [11]
24	26	(Slovakia) Daniela Hantuchová	2,045	280	160	1,925	Third round lost to (Russia) Elena Dementieva [12]
25	27	(Romania) Alexandra Dulgheru	2,005	5	160	2,160	Third round lost to (Russia) Vera Zvonareva [7]
26	28	(Czech Republic) Lucie Šafářová	1,975	5	5	1,975	First round lost to (Austria) Tamira Paszek [Q]
27	29	(Czech Republic) Petra Kvitová	1,869	280	160	1,749	Third round lost to (Belgium) Kim Clijsters [2]
28	30	(Russia) Alisa Kleybanova	1,840	5	100	1,935	Second round lost to (Italy) Sara Errani
29	33	(Ukraine) Alona Bondarenko	1,723	100	160	1,783	Third round lost to (Italy) Francesca Schiavone [6]
30	31	(Kazakhstan) Yaroslava Shvedova	1,770	160	5	1,615	First round lost to (Spain) Lourdes Domínguez Lino [Q]
31	32	(Estonia) Kaia Kanepi	1,725	5	500	2,220	Quarterfinals lost to (Russia) Vera Zvonareva [7]
32	34	(Bulgaria) Tsvetana Pironkova	1,708	5	100	1,803	Second round lost to (Luxembourg) Mandy Minella [Q]

The following players would have been seeded, but they withdrew from the event.

Rank	Player	Points before	Points defending	Points after	Withdrawal reason
1	(United States) Serena Williams	7,895	900	6,995	Foot surgery
15	(Belgium) Justine Henin	3,415	0	3,415	Right elbow injury

== Wildcard entries ==
Below are the lists of the wildcard awardees entering in the main draws and in the qualifying draws.

=== Men's singles ===
1. (Australia) Carsten Ball
2. (United States) James Blake
3. (United States) Bradley Klahn
4. (France) Guillaume Rufin
5. (United States) Tim Smyczek
6. (United States) Jack Sock
7. (United States) Ryan Sweeting
8. (United States) Donald Young

=== Women's singles ===
1. (United States) Beatrice Capra
2. (Australia) Sophie Ferguson
3. (United States) Chelsey Gullickson
4. (United States) Jamie Hampton
5. (United States) Christina McHale
6. (France) Virginie Razzano
7. (United States) Shelby Rogers
8. (United States) CoCo Vandeweghe

=== Men's doubles ===
1. (United States) Bradley Klahn / (United States) Tim Smyczek
2. (United States) David Martin / (United States) Donald Young
3. (United States) Ryan Harrison / (United States) Robert Kendrick
4. (United States) Robby Ginepri / (United States) Ryan Sweeting
5. (United States) Drew Courtney / (United States) Michael Shabaz
6. (United States) Brian Battistone / (United States) Ryler DeHeart
7. (United States) Sekou Bangoura / (United States) Nathan Pasha

=== Women's doubles ===
1. (United States) Alexa Glatch / (United States) CoCo Vandeweghe
2. (United States) Hilary Barte / (United States) Lindsay Burdette
3. (United States) Lauren Herring / (United States) Grace Min
4. (United States) Christina McHale / (United States) Riza Zalameda
5. (United States) Carly Gullickson / (United States) Chelsey Gullickson
6. (United States) Jamie Hampton / (United States) Melanie Oudin
7. (United States) Jill Craybas / (United States) Sloane Stephens

=== Mixed doubles ===
1. (United States) Beatrice Capra / (United States) Jack Sock
2. (United States) Jill Craybas / (United States) Michael Russell
3. (United States) Nicole Gibbs / (United States) Sam Querrey
4. (United States) Carly Gullickson / (United States) Travis Parrott
5. (United States) Racquel Kops-Jones / (United States) Eric Butorac
6. (United States) Melanie Oudin / (United States) Ryan Harrison
7. (United States) Abigail Spears / (United States) Scott Lipsky

== Protected ranking ==
The following players were accepted directly into the main draw using a protected ranking:

Men's Singles

- (Argentina) David Nalbandian (15)
- (Russia) Dmitry Tursunov (58)
- (Argentina) Máximo González (66)
- (Belgium) Kristof Vliegen (68)

Women's Singles

- (United Kingdom) Anne Keothavong (55)
- (Poland) Urszula Radwańska (75)
- (Croatia) Jelena Kostanić Tošić (101)

== Qualifier entries ==
Below are the lists of the qualifiers entering the main draw.

=== Men's singles ===
1. (Croatia) Ivan Dodig
2. (Czech Republic) Lukáš Rosol
3. (Canada) Peter Polansky
4. (Czech Republic) Dušan Lojda
5. (Austria) Andreas Haider-Maurer
6. (Brazil) Júlio Silva
7. (Slovakia) Martin Kližan
8. (Canada) Milos Raonic
9. (Lithuania) Ričardas Berankis
10. (United States) Ryan Harrison
11. (United States) Robert Kendrick
12. (Japan) Kei Nishikori
13. (France) Adrian Mannarino
14. (South Africa) Rik de Voest
15. (France) Benoît Paire
16. (France) Marc Gicquel

=== Women's singles ===
1. (Uzbekistan) Akgul Amanmuradova
2. (Spain) Nuria Llagostera Vives
3. (Romania) Monica Niculescu
4. (Croatia) Mirjana Lučić
5. (Australia) Sally Peers
6. (Austria) Tamira Paszek
7. (Luxembourg) Mandy Minella
8. (Spain) Lourdes Domínguez Lino
9. (Canada) Rebecca Marino
10. (United States) Irina Falconi
11. (Italy) Maria Elena Camerin
12. (Slovakia) Zuzana Kučová
13. (Czech Republic) Zuzana Ondrášková
14. (Ukraine) Olga Savchuk
15. (India) Sania Mirza
16. (Portugal) Michelle Larcher de Brito

== Withdrawals ==
The following players were accepted directly into the main tournament, but withdrew with injuries or personal reasons.

Men's singles

- ‡ (Croatia) Ivo Karlović (51) → replaced by (Jamaica) Dustin Brown (99)
- ‡ (Croatia) Mario Ančić (65 PR) → replaced by (Germany) Tobias Kamke (100)
- ‡ (France) Jo-Wilfried Tsonga (11) → replaced by (Argentina) Carlos Berlocq (101)
- ‡ (Germany) Tommy Haas (20 PR) → replaced by (Israel) Dudi Sela (102)
- ‡ (Argentina) Juan Martín del Potro (7) → replaced by (India) Somdev Devvarman (103)

Women's singles

- † (Belgium) Justine Henin (12) → replaced by (Czech Republic) Sandra Záhlavová (102)
- ‡ (Hungary) Melinda Czink (71) → replaced by (Russia) Anna Chakvetadze (103)
- ‡ (United States) Serena Williams (1) → replaced by (Hungary) Gréta Arn (104)

† – not included on entry list
‡ – withdrew from entry list

== Point distribution ==
Stage	Men's singles	Men's doubles	Women's singles	Women's doubles
Champion	2000			
Finals	1200		1400	
Semifinals	720		900	
Quarterfinals	360		500	
Round of 16	180		280	
Round of 32	90		160	
Round of 64	45	0	100	5
Round of 128	10	–	5	–
Qualifier	25	–	60	–
Qualifying 3rd round	16	–	50	–
Qualifying 2nd round	8	–	40	–
Qualifying 1st round	0	–	2	–

== Prize money ==
All prize money is in U.S. dollars ($); doubles prize money is distributed per pair.

=== Men's and women's singles ===
- Winners: $1,700,000
- Runners-up: $850,000
- Semi-finalists: $400,000
- Quarter-finalists: $200,000
- Fourth round: $100,000
- Third round: $50,250
- Second round: $31,000
- First round: $19,000

=== Men's and women's doubles ===
- Winners: $420,000
- Runners-up: $210,000
- Semi-finalists: $105,000
- Quarter-finalists: $50,000
- Third round: $25,000
- Second round: $15,000
- First round: $10,000

=== Mixed doubles ===
- Winners: $150,000
- Runners-up: $70,000
- Semi-finalists: $30,000
- Quarter-finalists: $15,000
- Second round: $10,000
- First round: $5,000

== Media coverage ==
Country	Broadcasters
United States	CBS; ESPN2; Tennis Channel
Canada	TSN; RDS; TSN2
Brazil	ESPN Brasil; SporTV
Argentina	ESPN Latin America; ESPN Dos; ESPN+
Mexico	ESPN Latin America; ESPN Dos; ESPN+
Colombia	ESPN Latin America; ESPN Dos; ESPN+
Peru	ESPN Latin America; ESPN Dos; ESPN+
Venezuela	ESPN Latin America; ESPN Dos; ESPN+
Chile	ESPN Latin America; ESPN Dos; ESPN+
Ecuador	ESPN Latin America; ESPN Dos; ESPN+
Bolivia	ESPN Latin America; ESPN Dos; ESPN+
Guatemala	ESPN Latin America; ESPN Dos; ESPN+
Cuba	ESPN Latin America; ESPN Dos; ESPN+
Dominican Republic	ESPN Latin America; ESPN Dos; ESPN+
Honduras	ESPN Latin America; ESPN Dos; ESPN+
Paraguay	ESPN Latin America; ESPN Dos; ESPN+
El Salvador	ESPN Latin America; ESPN Dos; ESPN+
Nicaragua	ESPN Latin America; ESPN Dos; ESPN+
Costa Rica	ESPN Latin America; ESPN Dos; ESPN+
Uruguay	ESPN Latin America; ESPN Dos; ESPN+
Panama	ESPN Latin America; ESPN Dos; ESPN+
United Kingdom	Sky Sports; British Eurosport
Switzerland	SF zwei Eurosport
France	Canal+ Eurosport
Armenia	Eurosport; Eurosport 2
Bulgaria	Eurosport; Eurosport 2
Denmark	Eurosport; Eurosport 2
Finland	Eurosport; Eurosport 2
Germany	Eurosport; Eurosport 2
Hungary	Eurosport; Eurosport 2
Israel	Eurosport; Eurosport 2
Italy	Eurosport; Eurosport 2
Montenegro	Eurosport; Eurosport 2
Poland	Eurosport; Eurosport 2
Romania	Eurosport; Eurosport 2
Sweden
Serbia	RTS; Eurosport; Eurosport 2
Portugal	RTP1; RTP2; Eurosport; Eurosport 2
Belgium	VRT
Spain	Digital plus Antena 3
Algeria	Al Jazeera Sports
Bahrain	Al Jazeera Sports
Comoros	Al Jazeera Sports
Djibouti	Al Jazeera Sports
Egypt	Al Jazeera Sports
Iraq	Al Jazeera Sports
Jordan	Al Jazeera Sports
Kuwait	Al Jazeera Sports
Lebanon	Al Jazeera Sports
Libya	Al Jazeera Sports
Mauritania	Al Jazeera Sports
Morocco	Al Jazeera Sports
Oman	Al Jazeera Sports
Palestinian Authority	Al Jazeera Sports
Qatar	Al Jazeera Sports
Saudi Arabia	Al Jazeera Sports
Somalia	Al Jazeera Sports
Sudan	Al Jazeera Sports
Syria	Al Jazeera Sports
Tunisia	Al Jazeera Sports
United Arab Emirates	Al Jazeera Sports
Yemen	Al Jazeera Sports
India	Ten Sports
Pakistan	Ten Sports
Japan	WOWOW
China	CCTV-5
Thailand	TrueVisions
Philippines	Balls
Indonesia	Vision 1 Sports

Preceded by 2010 Wimbledon Championships	Grand Slams	Succeeded by 2011 Australian Open
Preceded by New Haven	2010 US Open Series	Succeeded by None
