= 2011 RBC Bank Women's Challenger – Doubles =

Doubles
- 2011 RBC Bank Women's Challenger

Final
- Champion: (Canada) Sharon Fichman (Canada) Marie-Ève Pelletier
- Runner-up: (United States) Beatrice Capra (United States) Asia Muhammed
- Score: 6–1, 6–3

Events
| Singles | Doubles |
| ← 2010 · | RBC Bank Women's Challenger | · 2012 → |

Kristie Ahn and Nicole Gibbs were the defending champions, but both chose not to participate.
Sharon Fichman and Marie-Ève Pelletier defeated Beatrice Capra and Asia Muhammed in the final 6–1, 6–3.

== Seeds ==
1. (Canada) Sharon Fichman / (Canada) Marie-Ève Pelletier (champions)
2. (United States) Julie Ditty / (United States) Carly Gullickson (first round)
3. (Hungary) Tímea Babos / (United Kingdom) Melanie South (first round)
4. (United States) Christina Fusano / (United States) Alexa Glatch (semifinals)

== Draw ==
=== Key ===
- Q = Qualifier
- WC = Wild card
- LL = Lucky loser
- Alt = Alternate
- SE = Special exempt
- PR = Protected ranking
- ITF = ITF entry
- JE = Junior exempt
- w/o = Walkover
- r = Retired
- d = Defaulted
- SR = Special ranking

=== Draw ===
First round
1 | (Canada) S Fichman (Canada) M-È Pelletier | 6 | 6
WC | (United States) S Kalhorn (United States) A Marrow | 1 | 0
(United States) J Cohen (Slovenia) P Rampre | 2 | 3
(United States) A Fink (United States) Y Schnack | 6 | 6
3 | (Hungary) T Babos (United Kingdom) M South | 2 | 2
(United States) C Nagle (United States) A Weinhold | 6 | 6
(Canada) G Dabrowski (United States) W Jones | 2 | 2
(United States) E Lumpkin (United States) S Tweedie-Yates | 6 | 6
WC | (United States) J Pegula (United States) S Rogers | 6 | 6
(United States) M Falcon (United States) A Mueller | 1 | 2
(Brazil) MF Alves (United States) J Boserup | 5 | 6 | [8]
4 | (United States) C Fusano (United States) A Glatch | 7 | 4 | [10]
(United States) B Augustine (United States) L Litvak | 3 | 6^{3}
(United States) B Capra (United States) A Muhammed | 6 | 7
(Bolivia) MF Álvarez Terán (Brazil) V Segnini | 6 | 6
2 | (United States) J Ditty (United States) Ca Gullickson | 3 | 2

Quarterfinals
1 | (Canada) S Fichman (Canada) M-È Pelletier | 6 | 6
(United States) A Fink (United States) Y Schnack | 1 | 0
(United States) C Nagle (United States) A Weinhold | 0 | 3
(United States) E Lumpkin (United States) S Tweedie-Yates | 6 | 6
WC | (United States) J Pegula (United States) S Rogers | 4 | 2
4 | (United States) C Fusano (United States) A Glatch | 6 | 6
(United States) B Capra (United States) A Muhammed | w/o
(Bolivia) MF Álvarez Terán (Brazil) V Segnini

Semifinals
1 | (Canada) S Fichman (Canada) M-È Pelletier | 6 | 6
(United States) E Lumpkin (United States) S Tweedie-Yates | 4 | 3
4 | (United States) C Fusano (United States) A Glatch | 6 | 5 | [8]
(United States) B Capra (United States) A Muhammed | 2 | 7 | [10]

Final
1 | (Canada) S Fichman (Canada) M-È Pelletier | 6 | 6
(United States) B Capra (United States) A Muhammed | 1 | 3
