= Merz Aesthetics Women's Challenger =

ITF Women's Tour
- Location: Raleigh, North Carolina, United States
- Venue: North Hills Club
- Category: ITF Women's Circuit
- Surface: Clay (Outdoor)
- Draw: 32S/32Q/16D
- Prize money: $25,000
- Website: northhillsclub.com/merz

The Merz Aesthetics Women's Challenger (previously known as the RBC Bank Women's Challenger) was a tennis tournament held in Raleigh, North Carolina, a city in United States. Held since 2004, this ITF Circuit event was a $25,000 tournament played on outdoor clay courts. The event was previously a $75,000 and $50,000 tournament.

== Past finals ==
=== Singles ===
Year	Champion	Runner-up	Score
2015	(United States) Julia Boserup	(United States) Samantha Crawford	6–3, 6–2
2014	(Canada) Heidi El Tabakh	(United States) Maria Sanchez	6–3, 6–4
2013	(United States) Asia Muhammad	(United States) Chalena Scholl	6–2, 6–2
2012	(United States) Grace Min	(Belgium) Tamaryn Hendler	3–6, 6–2, 6–3
2011	(Slovenia) Petra Rampre	(Italy) Camila Giorgi	6–3, 6–2
2010	(Australia) Johanna Konta	(United States) Lindsay Lee-Waters	6–2, 5–7, 6–4
2009	(United States) Melanie Oudin	(United States) Lindsay Lee-Waters	6–1, 2–6, 6–4
2008	(United States) Chelsey Gullickson	(United States) Lauren Albanese	6–4, 2–6, 6–3
2007–06	Not held		
2005	(Ukraine) Olga Lazarchuk	(United States) Mary Gambale	6–3, 6–1
2004	(United States) Marissa Irwin	(United States) Mashona Washington	6–3, 6–3

=== Doubles ===
Year	Champion	Runner-up	Score
2015	(United States) Jan Abaza (Poland) Justyna Jegiołka	(United States) Jacqueline Cako (Australia) Sally Peers	7–6^{(7–4)}, 4–6, [10–7]
2014	(Chinese Taipei) Hsu Chieh-yu (United States) Alexandra Mueller	(United States) Danielle Lao (United States) Keri Wong	6–3, 6–3
2013	(United States) Asia Muhammad (United States) Allie Will	(Australia) Jessica Moore (Australia) Sally Peers	6–3, 6–3
2012	(Canada) Gabriela Dabrowski (Canada) Marie-Ève Pelletier	(United States) Alexandra Mueller (United States) Asia Muhammad	6–4, 4–6, [10–5]
2011	(Canada) Sharon Fichman (Canada) Marie-Ève Pelletier	(United States) Beatrice Capra (United States) Asia Muhammad	6–1, 6–3
2010	(United States) Kristie Ahn (United States) Nicole Gibbs	(United States) Alexandra Mueller (United States) Ahsha Rolle	6–3, 6–2
2009	(United States) Lilia Osterloh (United States) Riza Zalameda	(Germany) Carmen Klaschka (Germany) Sabine Klaschka	6–0, 6–0
2008	(United States) Kimberly Couts (Georgia (country)) Anna Tatishvili	(Switzerland) Stefania Boffa (Austria) Nicole Rottmann	6–3, 6–4
2007–06	Not held		
2005	(United States) Ashley Harkleroad (United States) Lindsay Lee-Waters	(Brazil) Maria Fernanda Alves (Canada) Stéphanie Dubois	6–2, 0–6, 6–3
2004	(United States) Ansley Cargill (Australia) Christina Wheeler	(Canada) Marie-Ève Pelletier (Netherlands) Anousjka van Exel	6–4, 6–4

== See also ==
- List of tennis tournaments
