= Arthur Ashe Stadium =

Tennis stadium in New York City

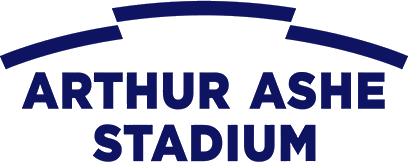

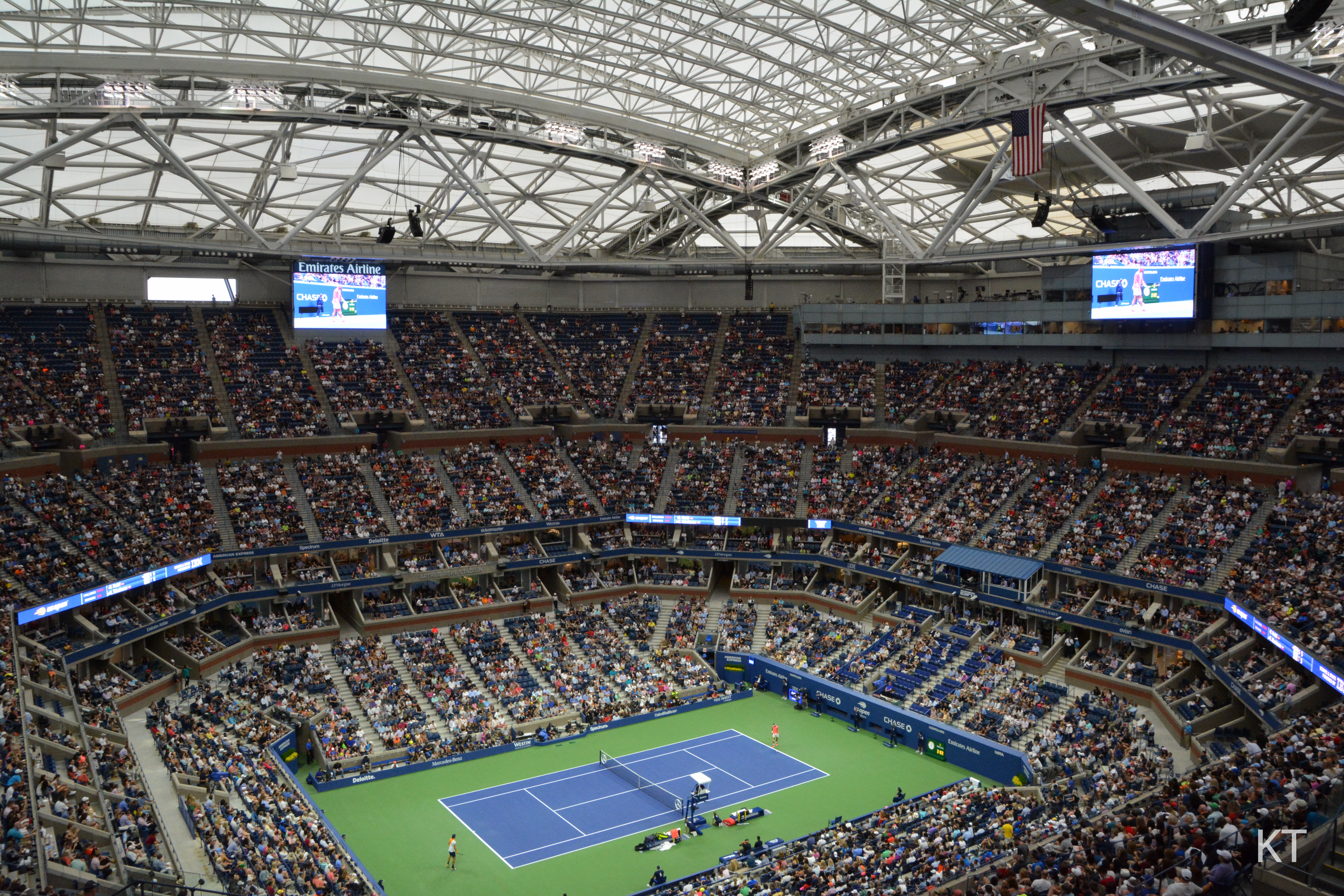
- Interior of the Arthur Ashe Stadium during 2018 US Open
- Interactive map of Arthur Ashe Stadium
- Location: USTA Billie Jean King National Tennis Center, Flushing, Queens, New York City
- Coordinates: 40°44′59.6″N 73°50′49.3″W
- Owner: USTA
- Capacity: 23,771
- Roof: Retractable
- Surface: Laykold
- Public transit: Long Island Rail Road (LIRR): Port Washington Branch at Mets–Willets Point; New York City Subway: trains at Mets–Willets Point

Construction
- Opened: 1997
- Renovated: 2016
- Cost: $ 254 million ($511 million in 2025 dollars)
- Architect: Rossetti Architects

Tenant
- US Open (USTA) (1997–present); Westminster Kennel Club Dog Show (2023–2024)

Arthur Ashe Stadium is a retractable roof tennis arena at Flushing Meadows–Corona Park in Queens, New York City. Part of the USTA Billie Jean King National Tennis Center, it is the main stadium of the US Open tennis tournament and has a capacity of 23,771, making it the largest tennis stadium in the world.

The stadium is named after Arthur Ashe (1943–1993), winner of the inaugural 1968 US Open, the first in which professionals could compete. The original stadium design, completed in 1997, had not included a roof. After suffering successive years of event delays from inclement weather, a new lightweight retractable roof was completed in 2016.

At the entrance passageway, which tennis players go through to enter the stadium's court, there is a plaque that displays a quotation delivered by former American tennis player Billie Jean King that reads: “Pressure is a privilege".

== History ==
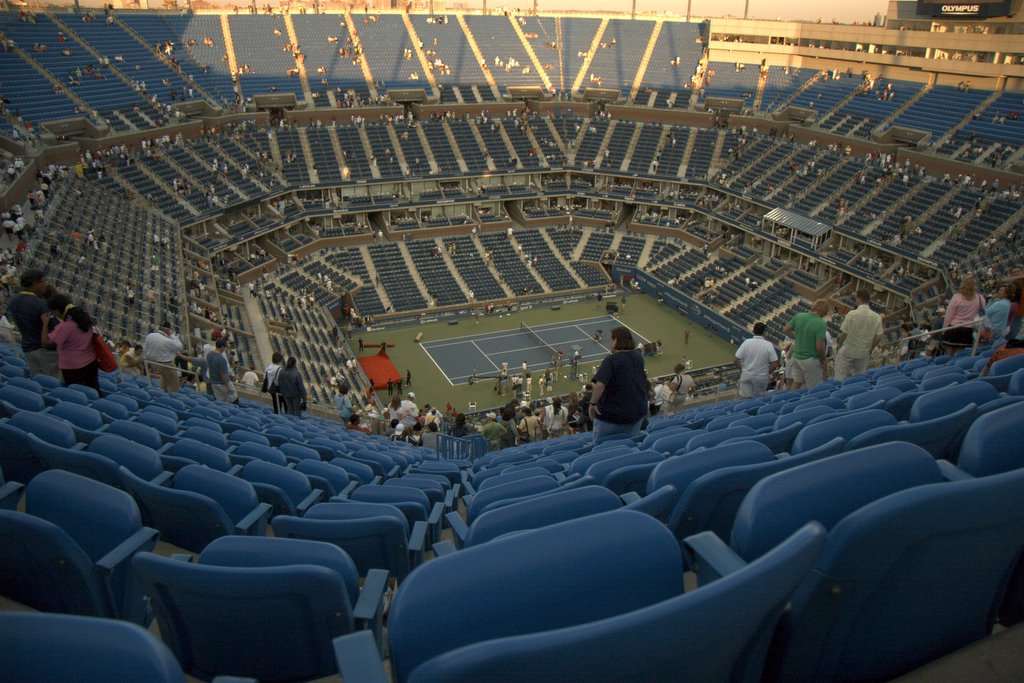
Seen in 2005

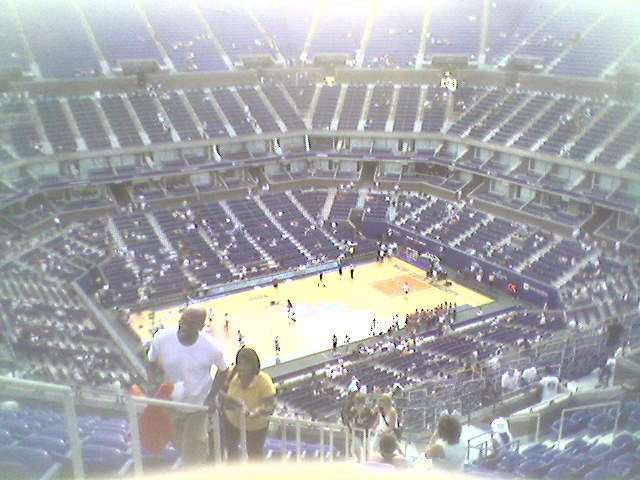
In July 2008, Arthur Ashe Stadium hosted its first professional basketball game played outdoors

Arthur Ashe Stadium occupies the site of the United States Pavilion, which was built for the 1964 New York World's Fair and demolished in 1977. The facility, which opened in 1997, replaced Louis Armstrong Stadium as the primary venue for the tournament. It cost $254 million to construct, and originally had 22,547 seats, 90 luxury suites, five restaurants, and a two-level players' lounge, making it by far the largest tennis-only venue in the world. Like the other 32 courts in the facility, it had a DecoTurf cushioned acrylic surface.

On August 25, 1997, the stadium opened by hosting the US Open, with Whitney Houston singing "One Moment in Time" during the stadium's inauguration ceremonies and dedicating the performance to the late Arthur Ashe.

The first official match played on the court was at the 1997 US Open between Tamarine Tanasugarn of Thailand and Chanda Rubin of the United States. Tanasugarn won in two sets.

The facility features a Hawk-Eye electronic system which allows tennis players to challenge the umpire's decision on calls made throughout championships. In 2005, the color scheme for the courts was changed from green to electric blue inner courts and a light green outer court. All US Open Series events now use this color scheme, providing television viewers a more easily trackable ball — with the yellow tennis balls contrasting more visibly against the blue courts.

== Non-tennis events ==
On July 19, 2008, the stadium hosted its first non-tennis event, a WNBA outdoor game known as the Liberty Outdoor Classic; it was the first-ever outdoor regular season game in professional basketball. The Indiana Fever beat the host New York Liberty 71–55. Portions of proceeds from the event went to the Breast Cancer Research Foundation.

On July 26–28, 2019, the stadium hosted the Fortnite World Cup, a three-day long esports tournament with a prize pool of US$30 million, $3 million of which awarded to the winner of the Finals.

During the COVID-19 pandemic in New York City, the stadium was converted for use as a hospital.

On September 22, 2021, professional wrestling promotion All Elite Wrestling (AEW) broadcast special episodes of its weekly programs Dynamite and Rampage from Arthur Ashe Stadium, billed as "AEW Grand Slam" The event marked AEW's debut show in New York City and the first professional wrestling show ever held at the tennis complex. "Grand Slam" was held at the stadium again in 2022, 2023, and 2024.

After having been displaced from its traditional February scheduling and Madison Square Garden due to COVID-19, the Westminster Kennel Club Dog Show re-located to the complex for 2023 and 2024, with Arthur Ashe Stadium serving as the main venue. It returned to MSG in 2025.

== Retractable roof ==
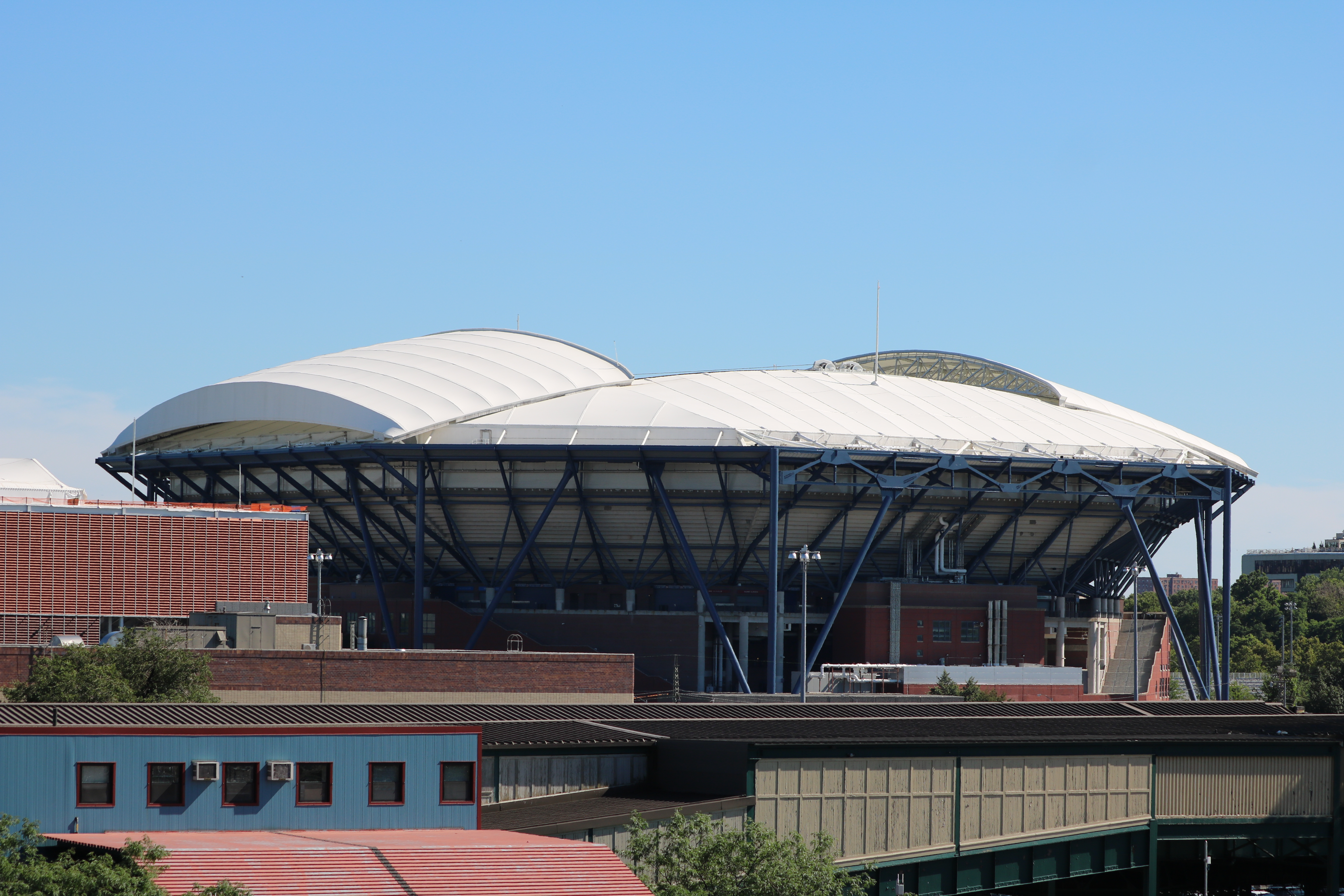
Arthur Ashe Stadium with retractable roof installed, 2018

Lacking a roof, where relatively strong and unpredictable winds could occur inside the stadium, events were vulnerable to inclement weather—and five straight years of rain delays occurred during the US Open men's singles final from 2008 to 2012.

Despite the original design's lacking provisions for a roof, the USTA announced in 2013 plans to construct a roof for the stadium using a 5,000-short-ton (4,536-tonne) superstructure—having consulted "with every architect involved in the design of a stadium roof in North America."

Notably, the site of the Ashe center featured poor soil conditions. It had previously been Manhattan's Corona Ash Dumps (featured prominently in F. Scott Fitzgerald's The Great Gatsby as the Valley of Ashes) and prior to that a natural wetland swamp. For the new roof, a very light solution was critical.

The roof has two 800-ton fabric panels made of 210,000 square feet (20,000 m^{2}) of lightweight PTFE membrane which can open or close on glides, up to 25 feet per minute, to create an opening roughly the size of 17 Olympic swimming pools. The stadium is not fully conditioned; a new chilled water ventilation system controls humidity when the roof is closed. The new cantilevering design is supported by eight columns that sit on concrete bases, each supported by 20 piles driven 150 to 200 feet deep and has a data acquisition and recording system along with synchronized cameras to interpret the data created by the complex control systems. The roof, which cost $150 million, was part of a $550 million renovation of the National Tennis Center. The retractable roof project was completed in 2016.

The roof was designed by Rossetti Architects and its structure engineered by WSP Global. Geiger Engineers designed the roof's mechanization system. Engineer of Record for the mechanization system was Hardesty & Hanover in partnership with Morgan Engineering.

== Gallery ==
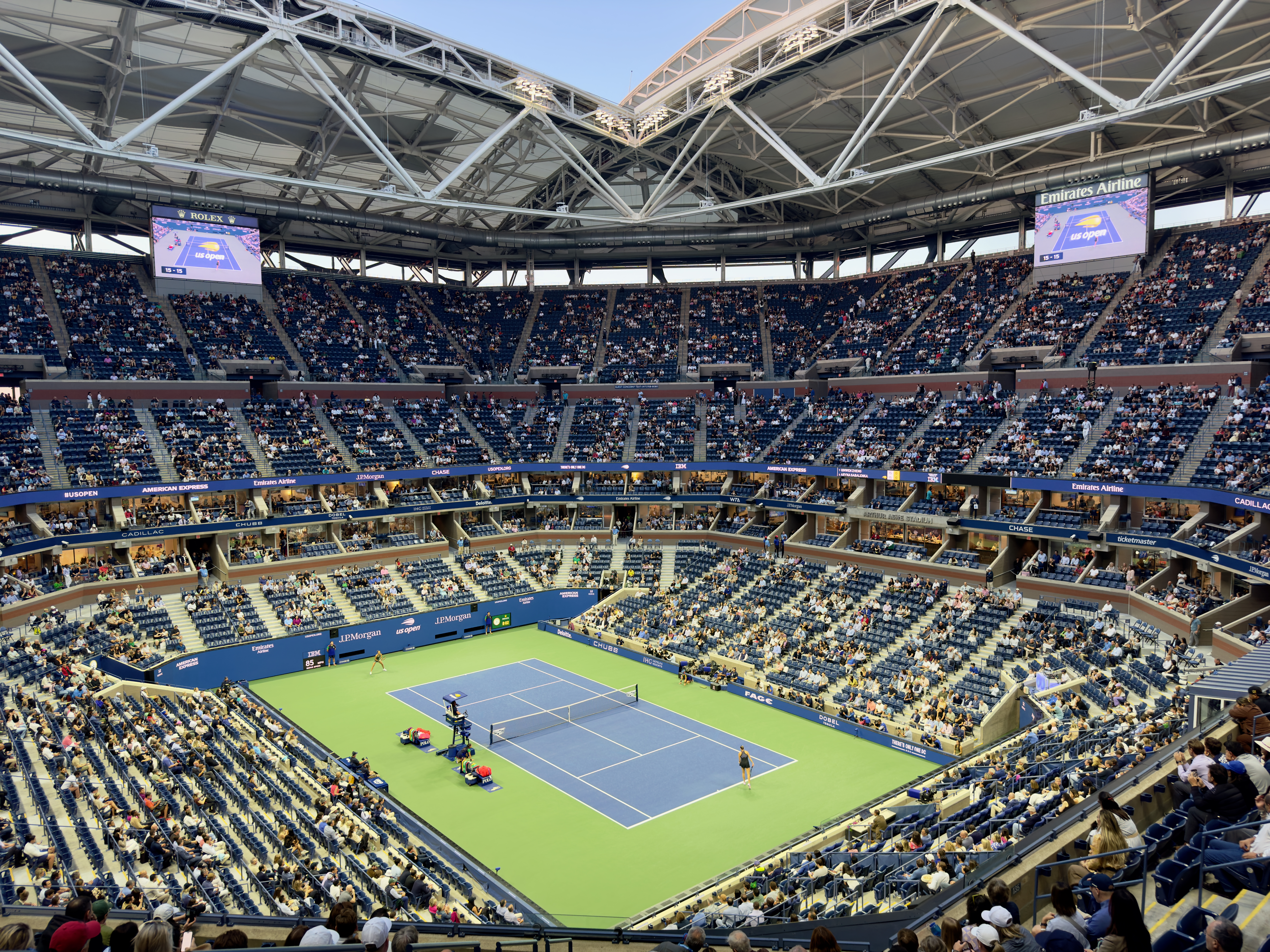
Aryna Sabalenka vs. Qinwen Zheng in the 2024 US Open quarter-finals.

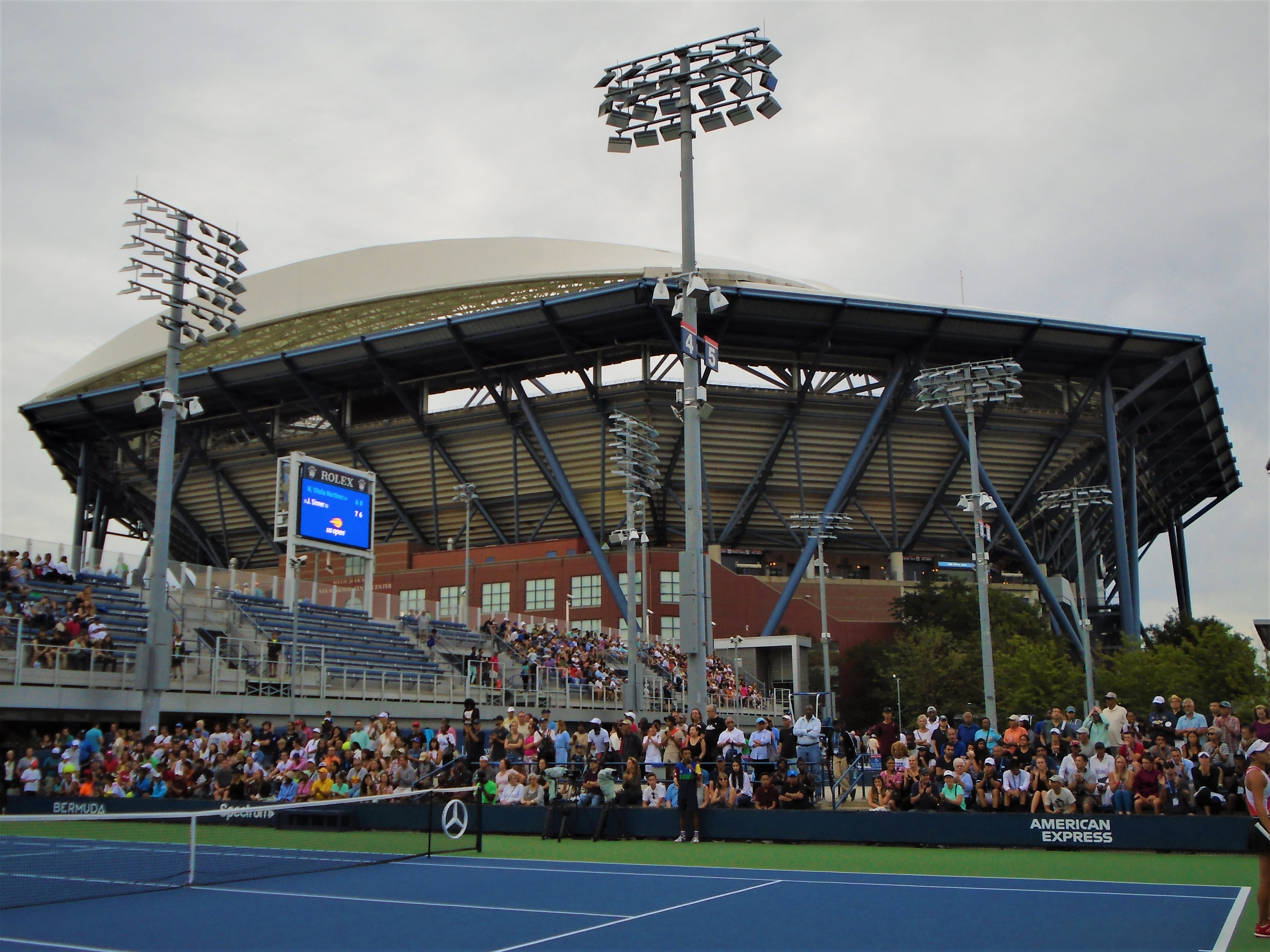
Arthur Ashe Seen from Court 4 during fan week of the 2019 US Open.

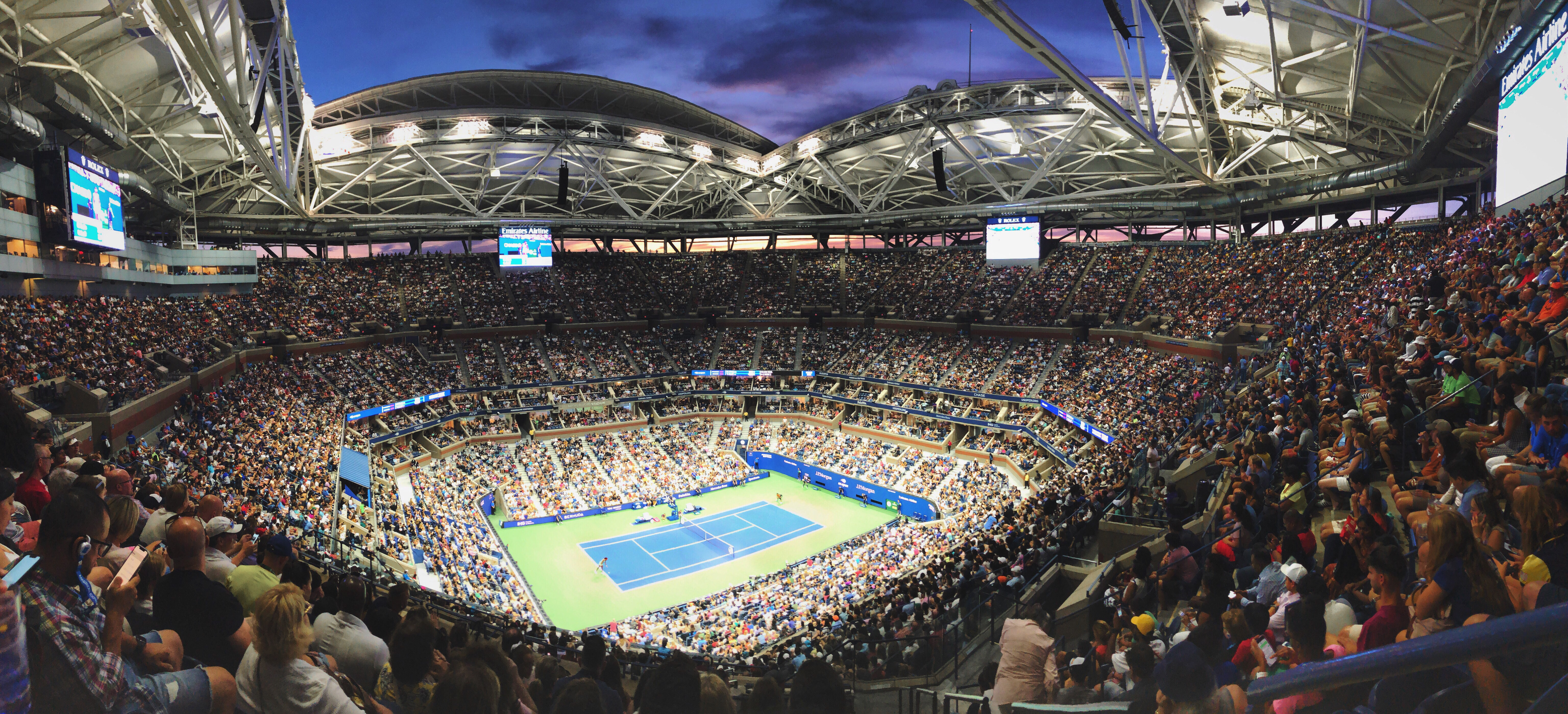
Arthur Ashe with the roof open at night during the 2019 US Open

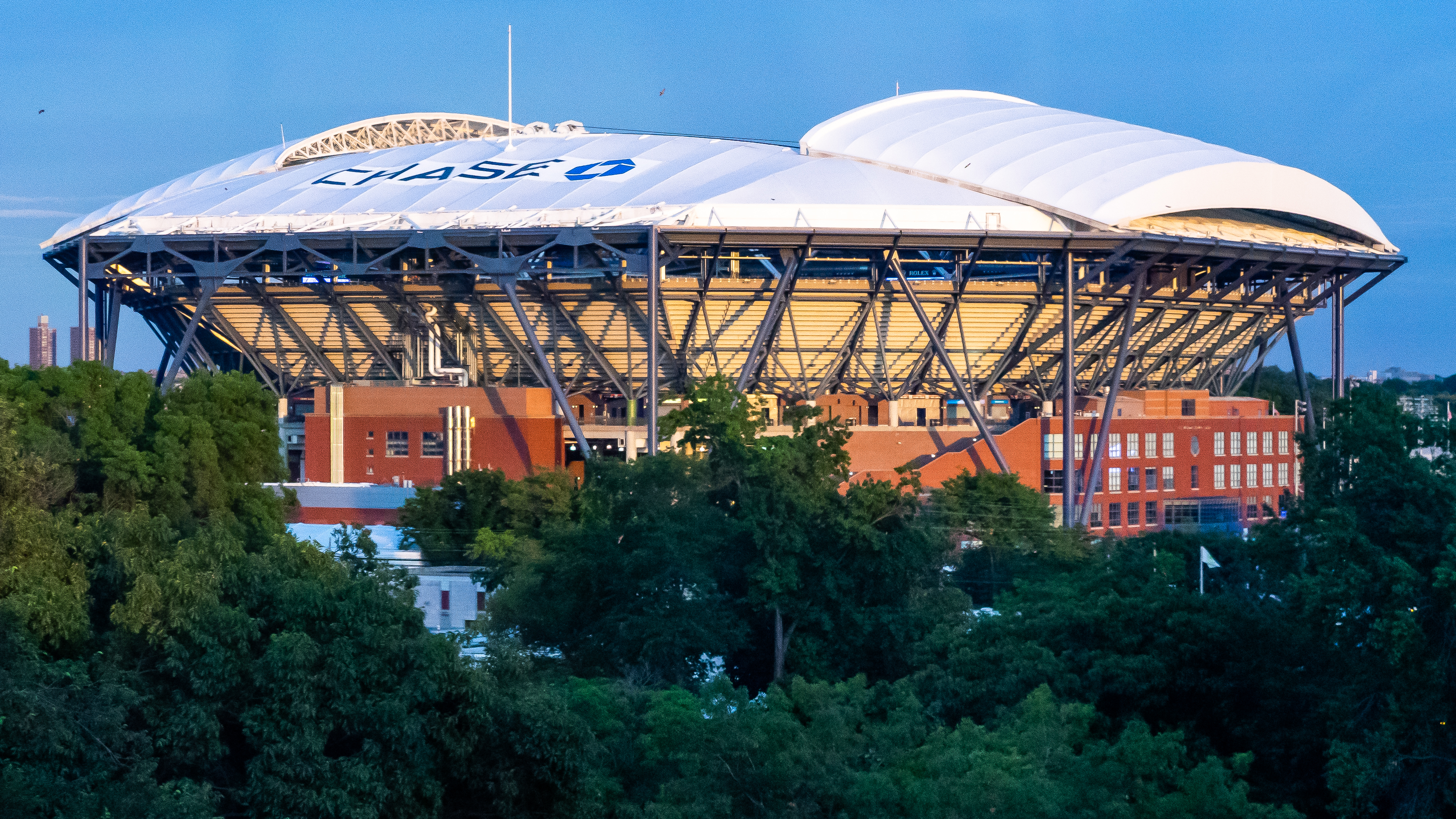
Arthur Ashe stadium seen from a distance in 2019

== See also ==
- List of tennis stadiums by capacity
- Lists of stadiums
