= Louis Armstrong Stadium (1978–2016) =

Former tennis venue in New York City

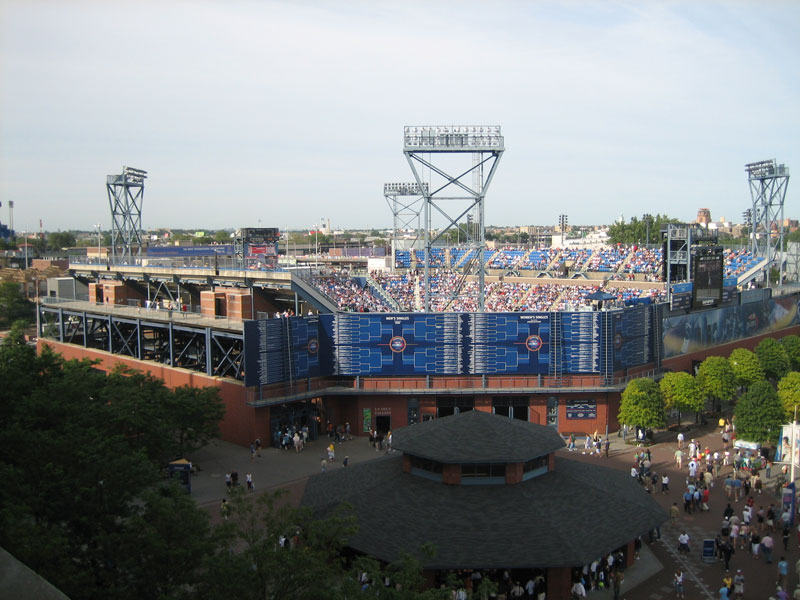
- as seen from Arthur Ashe Stadium
- Interactive map of Louis Armstrong Stadium
- Location: USTA Billie Jean King National Tennis Center, Flushing, Queens, New York City
- Coordinates: 40°45′03.4″N 73°50′43.8″W
- Owner: USTA
- Capacity: 10,200; 18,000 (approximate, prior to construction of Arthur Ashe Stadium)
- Surface: DecoTurf

Construction
- Opened: 1978
- Closed: 2016
- Demolished: October 2016
- Architect: Rossetti Architects

Tenant
- US Open (USTA) (1978–2016)

Louis Armstrong Stadium was a tennis stadium of the USTA Billie Jean King National Tennis Center and one of the venues of the US Open. Armstrong was the main stadium before Arthur Ashe Stadium opened in 1997, after which it served as the No. 2 stadium. It was named after the noted jazz musician Louis Armstrong, who lived nearby until his death in 1971 and was a significant figure in the civil rights movement.

== Original stadium ==
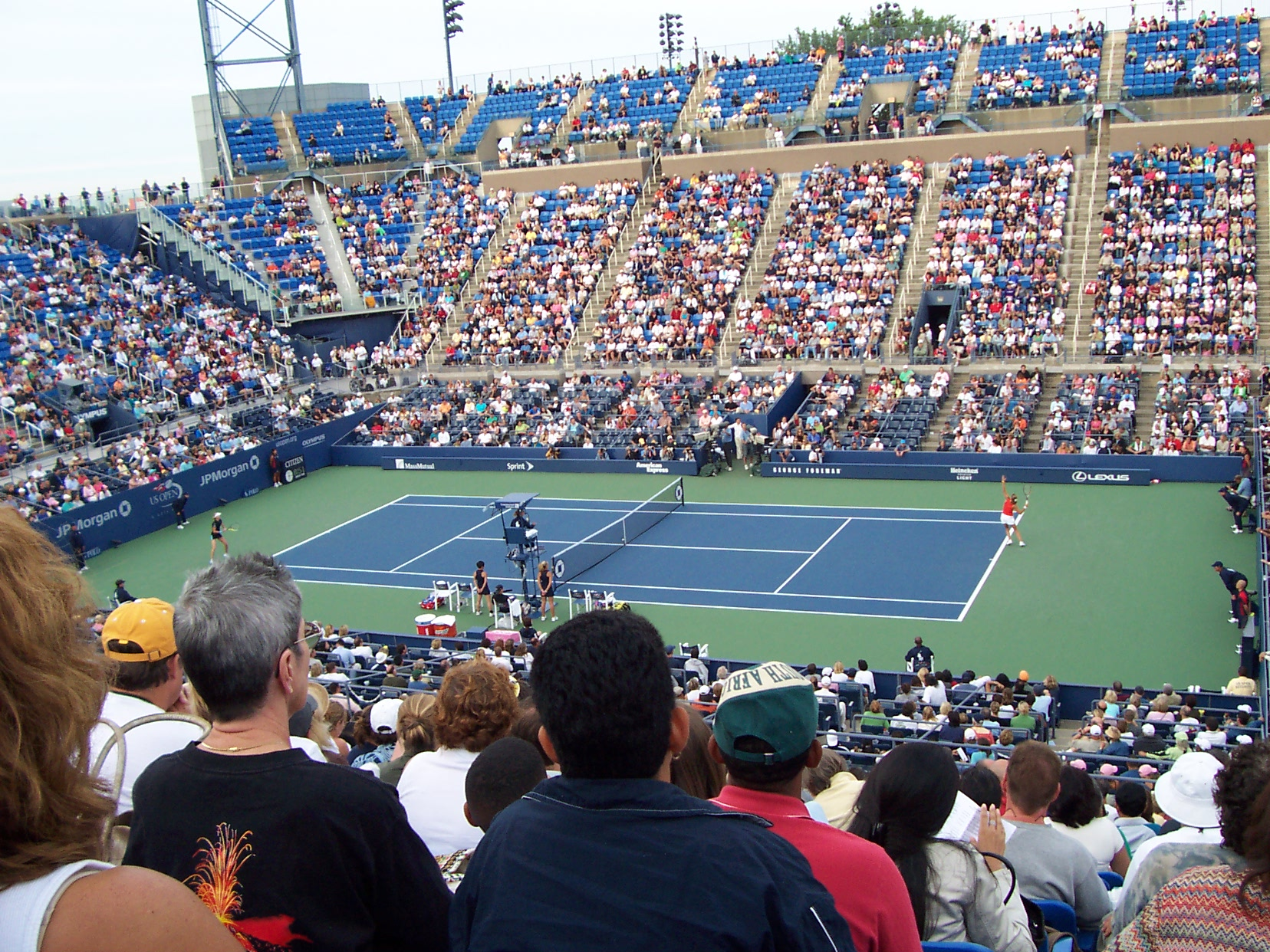
Inside Armstrong Stadium during the 2006 US Open

The stadium was originally built as the Singer Bowl for the 1964 New York World's Fair, and hosted special events and concerts afterwards. It was renamed the Louis Armstrong Stadium in 1973 but closed the following year.

In the early 1970s the United States Tennis Association was looking for a new place to host the US Open, for its relations with the West Side Tennis Club in Forest Hills, which had hosted the tournament, were breaking down. The USTA was initially unable to find a sufficient site, but the association's incoming president, W.E. Hester saw the old Singer Bowl from the window of an airplane flying into LaGuardia Airport. The old, long rectangular stadium was heavily renovated and divided into two venues, becoming the square Louis Armstrong Stadium, with the remaining third becoming the attached Grandstand, with a seating capacity of about 6,000.

In 1997, the stadium was replaced as the US Open's primary venue by the new Arthur Ashe Stadium. Armstrong Stadium was renovated again: the top tiers of seating were removed, which reduced capacity from the peak of 18,000 to 10,200, while a brick facade was added to match that of Ashe Stadium.

The stadium was demolished in October 2016. For the 2017 tournament, while construction was still ongoing on the new stadium, a temporary 8,800-seat stadium was built on the site of the demolished ticket office and East Gate entrance, on Parking Lot B, close to the boardwalk ramp to the subway and LIRR trains.

== Current stadium ==
A new 14,000-seat Louis Armstrong Stadium opened for the 2018 US Open. This new stadium features a retractable roof and is the largest No. 2 stadium at a Grand Slam site.

== See also ==
- List of tennis stadiums by capacity

== External Galleries ==
- Views of Louis Armstrong Stadium
- Old Stadium / Singer bowl Demolition
