= Alexis King =

American tennis player

- Country (sports): United States
- Born: 31 March 1983 (age 41)
- Height: 5 ft 2 in (157 cm)
- Turned pro: 2002
- Plays: Left-handed
- Prize money: $30,625

Singles
- Career record: 85–65
- Career titles: 3 ITF
- Highest ranking: No. 343 (7 July 2008)

Doubles
- Career record: 0–1

Alexis King (born March 31, 1983) is an American former tennis player. Before marriage, she was known as Alexis Gordon.

Her career-high singles ranking is 343, achieved July 2008, a ranking which gave her a direct entry into the 2008 Ordina Open, where she lost in the first round to New Zealander Marina Erakovic.

This has been King's only appearance at a WTA Tour event. In her career, she won three singles titles on the ITF Women's Circuit.

== ITF Circuit finals ==
=== Singles (3–2) ===
$100,000 tournaments
$75,000 tournaments
$50,000 tournaments
$25,000 tournaments
$10,000 tournaments

Outcome	No.	Date	Tournament	Surface	Opponent	Score
Winner	1.	28 April 2008	Charlottesville, United States	Clay	(Russia) Olga Puchkova	6–3, 6–3
Runner-up	2.	24 May 2010	Sumter, United States	Hard	(Croatia) Jelena Pandžić	2–6, 6–1, 2–6
Winner	3.	31 May 2010	Hilton Head, United States	Hard	(United States) Jacqueline Cako	6–2, 6–2
Winner	4.	23 May 2011	Sumter, United States	Hard	(United States) Brooke Austin	6–3, 7–5
Runner-up	5.	11 July 2011	Atlanta, United States	Hard	(United States) Lauren Davis	6–1, 2–6, 2–6
