= Tennis court =

Type of sports venue

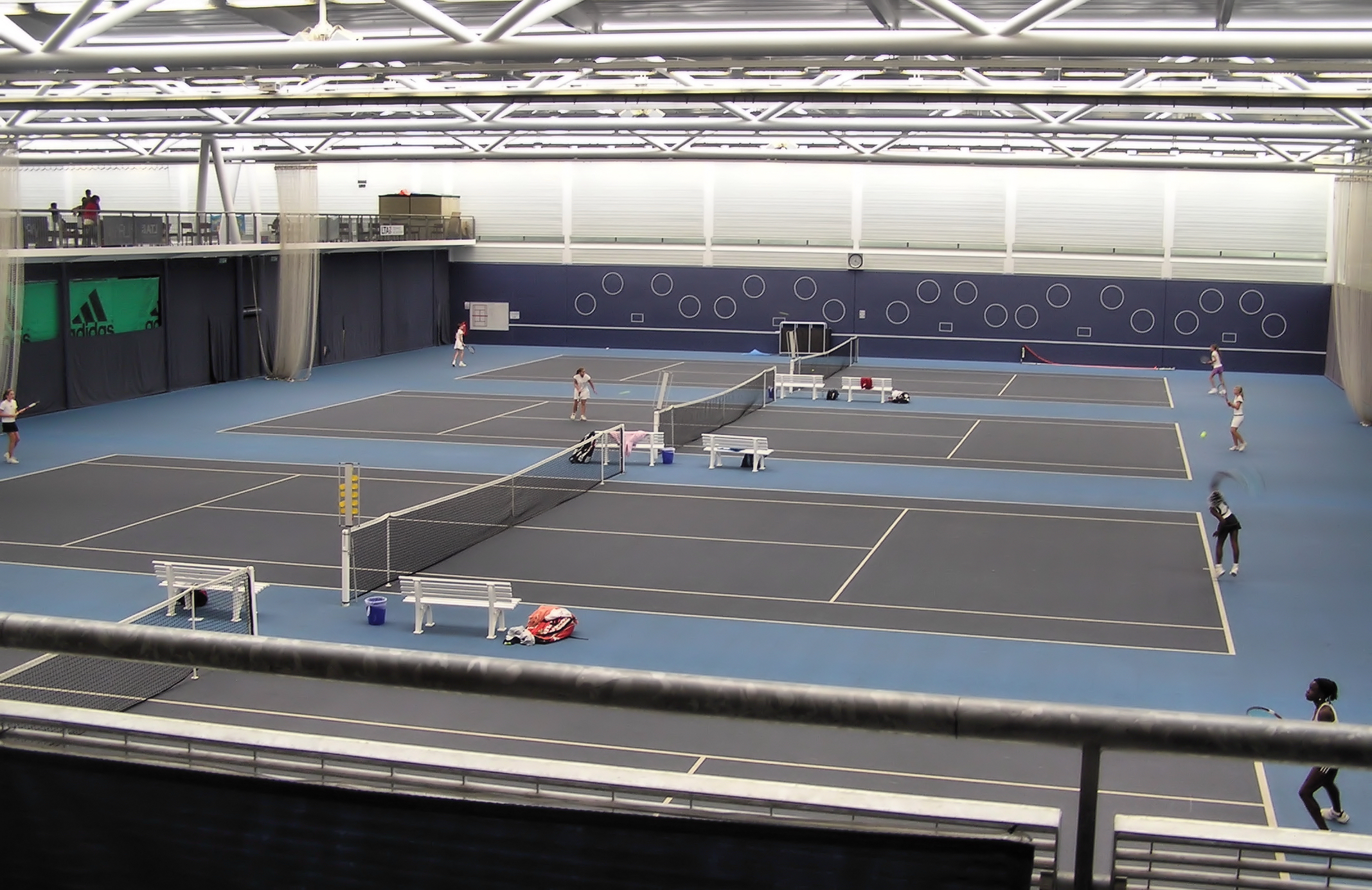
Indoor tennis courts at the University of Bath, England

A tennis court is the venue where the sport of tennis is played. It is a firm rectangular surface with a low net stretched across the centre. The same surface can be used to play both doubles and singles matches. A variety of surfaces can be used to create a tennis court, each with its own characteristics which affect the playing style of the game.

== Dimensions ==
The dimensions of a tennis court.

The dimensions of a tennis court are defined and regulated by the International Tennis Federation (ITF) governing body and are written down in the annual 'Rules of Tennis' document. The court is 78 ft (23.77 m) long. Its width is 27 ft (8.23 m) for singles matches and 36 ft (10.97 m) for doubles matches. The service line is 21 ft (6.40 m) from the net. Additional clear space around the court is needed in order for players to reach overrun balls for a total of 60 ft (18 m) wide and 120 ft (37 m) long. A net is stretched across the full width of the court, parallel with the baselines, dividing it into two equal ends. The net is 3 ft 6 in (1.07 m) high at the posts, and 3 ft (0.914 m) high in the center. The net posts are 3 ft (0.914 m) outside the doubles court on each side or, for a singles net, 3 ft (0.914 m) outside the singles court on each side.

Based on the standard rules of tennis, the size of the court is measured to the outside of the respective baselines and sidelines. The "service" lines ("T" and the "service" line) are centered. The ball must completely miss the line to be considered "out". This also means that the width of the line (except for the center service line) is irrelevant to play. The center service line is 2 in (5 cm), the other lines are between 1 and 2 in (3 and 5 cm) wide, whereas the baseline may be up to 4 in (10 cm) wide.

=== Smaller courts ===
The ITF's Play and Stay campaign promotes playing on smaller courts with slower red, orange, and green balls for younger children. This gives children more time and control so they can serve, rally, and score from the first lesson on courts that are sized to fit their bodies. The ITF has mandated that official competition for children aged 10 years and under should be played on "Orange" courts 18 m (59 ft) long by 6.4 m (21 ft) wide. Competition for children under 8 years is played on "Red" courts that are 11 m (36 ft) long and 5.5 m (18 ft) wide. The net is always 0.8 m high in the center.

== Surfaces ==
ITF Court Pace Classification Programme

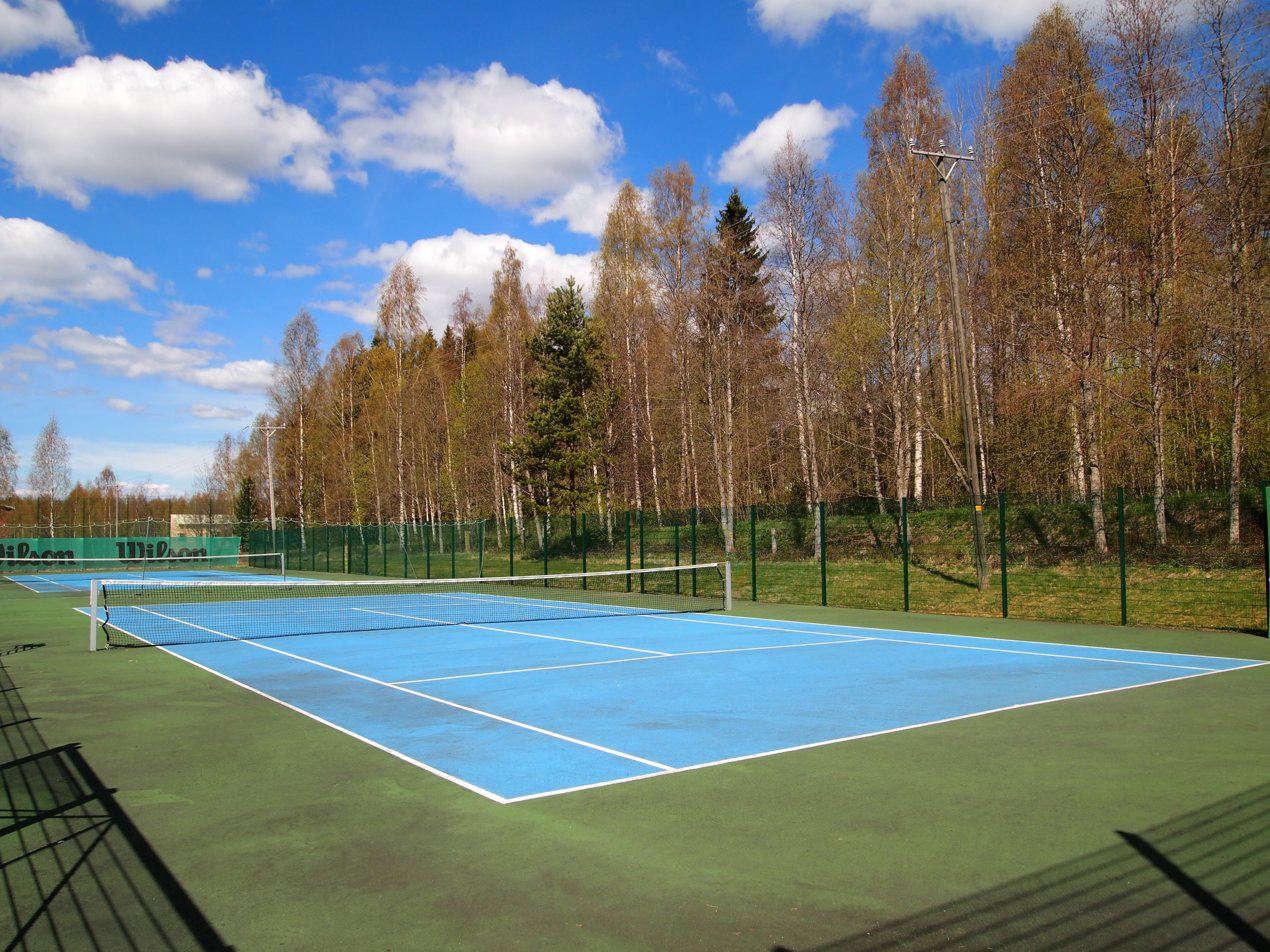
Tennis court in Petäjävesi, Finland

Tennis is played on a variety of surfaces and each surface has its own characteristics which affect the playing style of the game. There are four main types of courts depending on the materials used for the court surface: clay courts, hard courts, grass courts and carpet courts. The International Tennis Federation (ITF) lists different surfaces and properties and classifies surfaces into one of five pace settings:

- Category 1 (slow)
- Category 2 (medium-slow)
- Category 3 (medium)
- Category 4 (medium-fast)
- Category 5 (fast)

Of the current four Grand Slam tournaments, the Australian and US Open use hard courts, the French Open is played on clay, and Wimbledon, the only Grand Slam to have always been played on the same surface, is played on grass. The Australian Open switched from grass to hard courts in 1988 and in its early years the French championship alternated between clay and sand/rubble courts. The US Open is the only major to have been played on three surfaces; it was played on grass from its inception until 1974, green clay from 1975 until 1977 and hard courts since it moved from the West Side Tennis Club to the National Tennis Center in 1978.

ITF uses the following classification for tennis court surface types:

| Surface code | Type | Description |
| A | Acrylic | Textured, pigmented, resin-bound coating |
| B | Artificial clay | Synthetic surface with the appearance of clay |
| C | Artificial grass | Synthetic surface with the appearance of natural grass |
| D | Asphalt | Bitumen-bound aggregate |
| E | Carpet | Textile or polymeric material supplied in rolls or sheets of finished product |
| F | Clay | Unbound mineral aggregate |
| G | Concrete | Cement-bound aggregate |
| H | Grass | Natural grass grown from seed |
| J | Other | E.g. modular systems (tiles), wood, canvas |

=== Clay courts ===
Clay courts are made of crushed shale, stone or brick. The French Open is the only Grand Slam tournament still played on clay; the courts there are made from crushed red brick (known commonly as "European clay", or terre battue in France).

Clay courts slow down the ball and produce a high bounce in comparison to grass or hard courts, taking away many of the advantages of big serves. For this reason, the clay court heavily favors baseline players, as it is hard for attacking serve-and-volley players to dominate on the surface. Clay courts are cheaper to construct than other types of tennis courts, but a clay surface costs more to maintain. Clay courts need to be rolled to preserve flatness. The clay's water content must be balanced; green clay courts (see below) are generally required to be sloped to allow water run-off.

Clay courts are more common in Europe and Latin America than in North America. The clay courts that do exist in the United States tend to be made of green clay, which consists of crushed basalt; they are usually known by their brand name, HarTru. A "maroon" form of clay, advertised as "American red clay", is also used at the U.S. Men's Clay Court Championships in Houston, Texas. Clay courts with a top dressing of burnt shale – which makes the surface grittier and allows for faster play – can be found in Britain, especially in northern England and Scotland (where they are known as "blaes" courts). More esoteric clay-like surfaces, meanwhile, still exist in rural Australia ('antbed' courts, made out of compacted termite mounds and/or loam), India (animal dung) and the Philippines (crushed sea-shells).

Historically for the Grand Slams clay courts have been used at the French Open since 1891 and the US Open from 1975 to 1977 (on green clay).

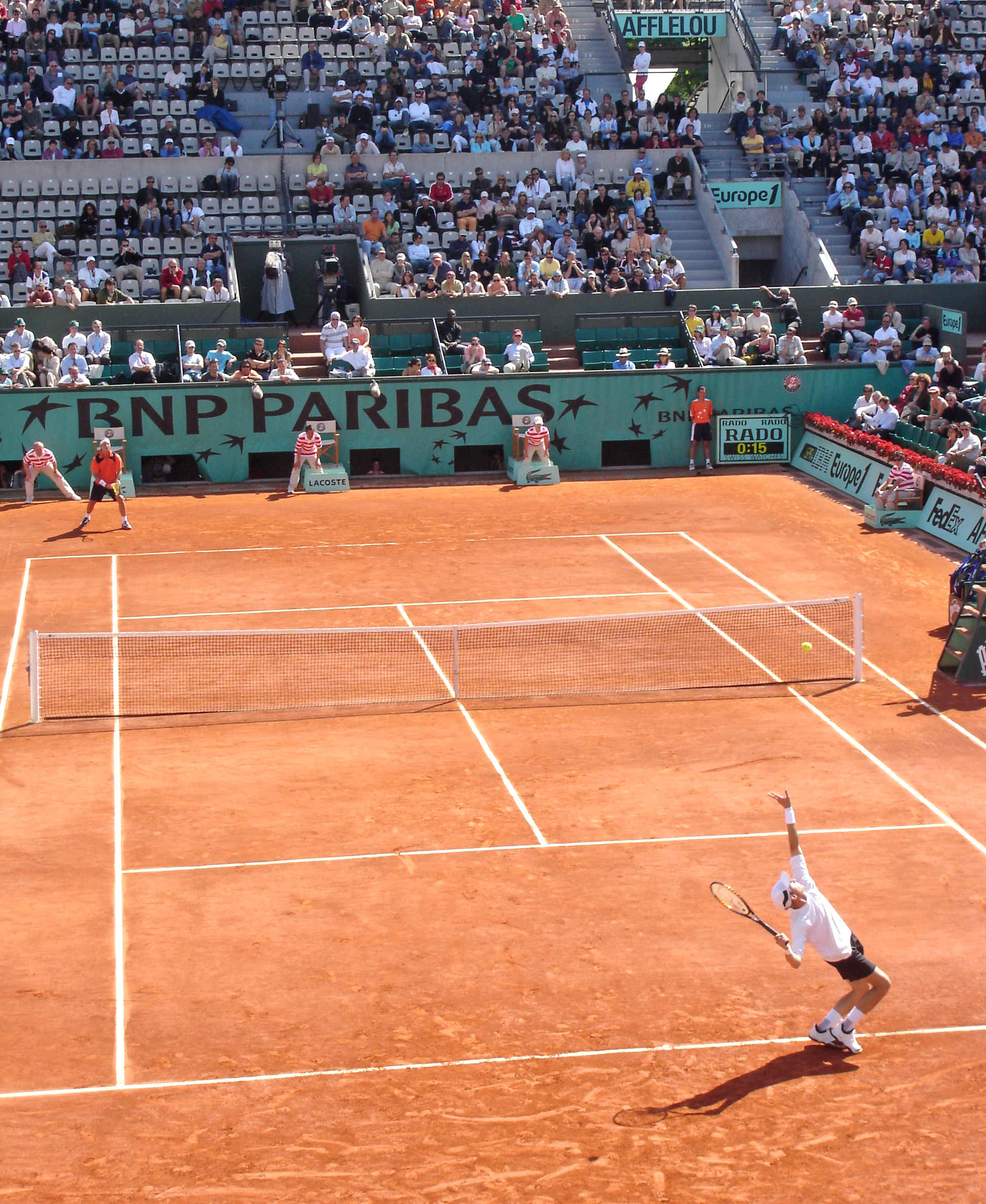
The French Open is played on clay courts.

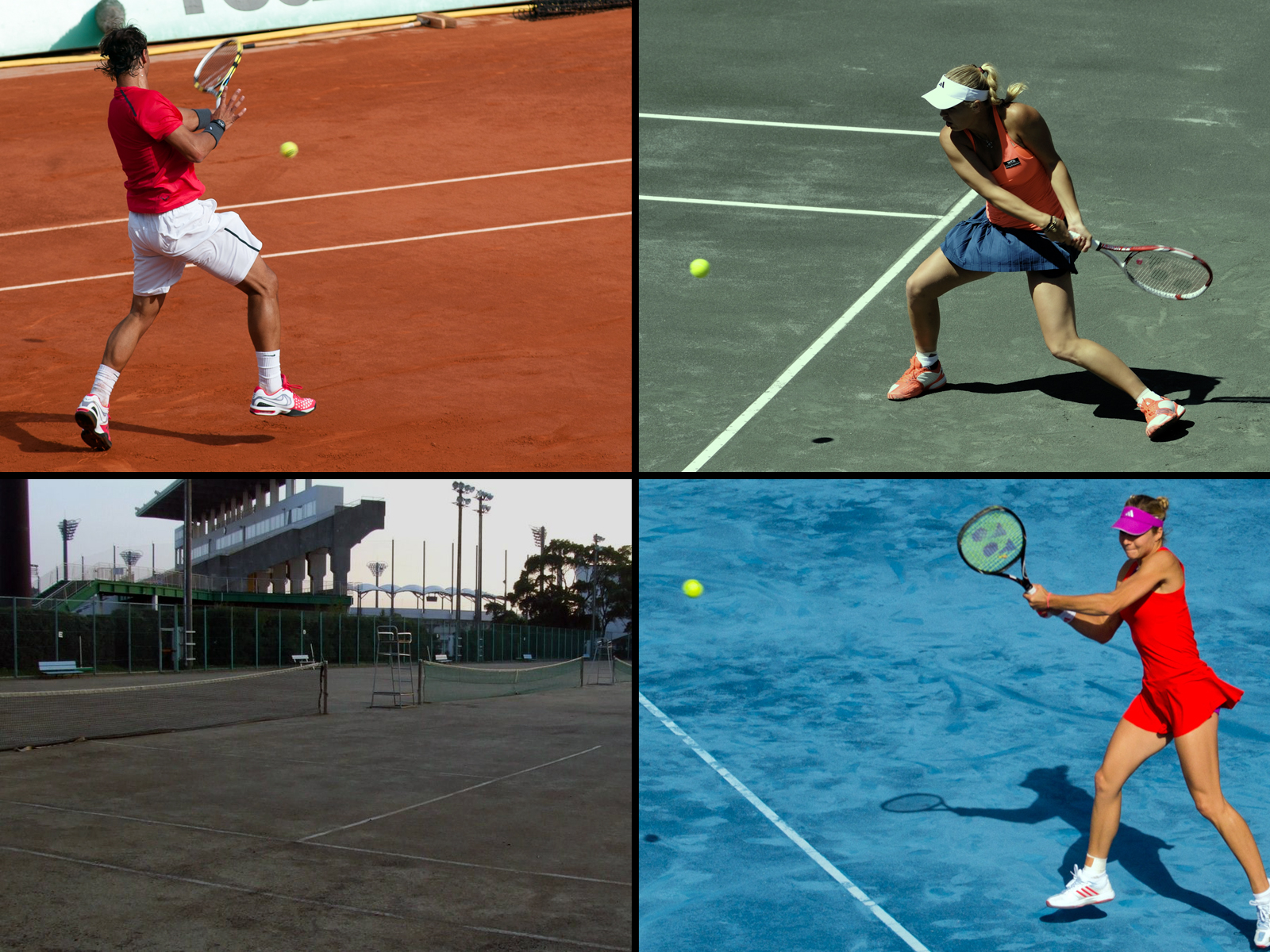
Clay courts can come in many colors. Clockwise from top-left: red, green (HarTru), blue, gray

=== Grass courts ===
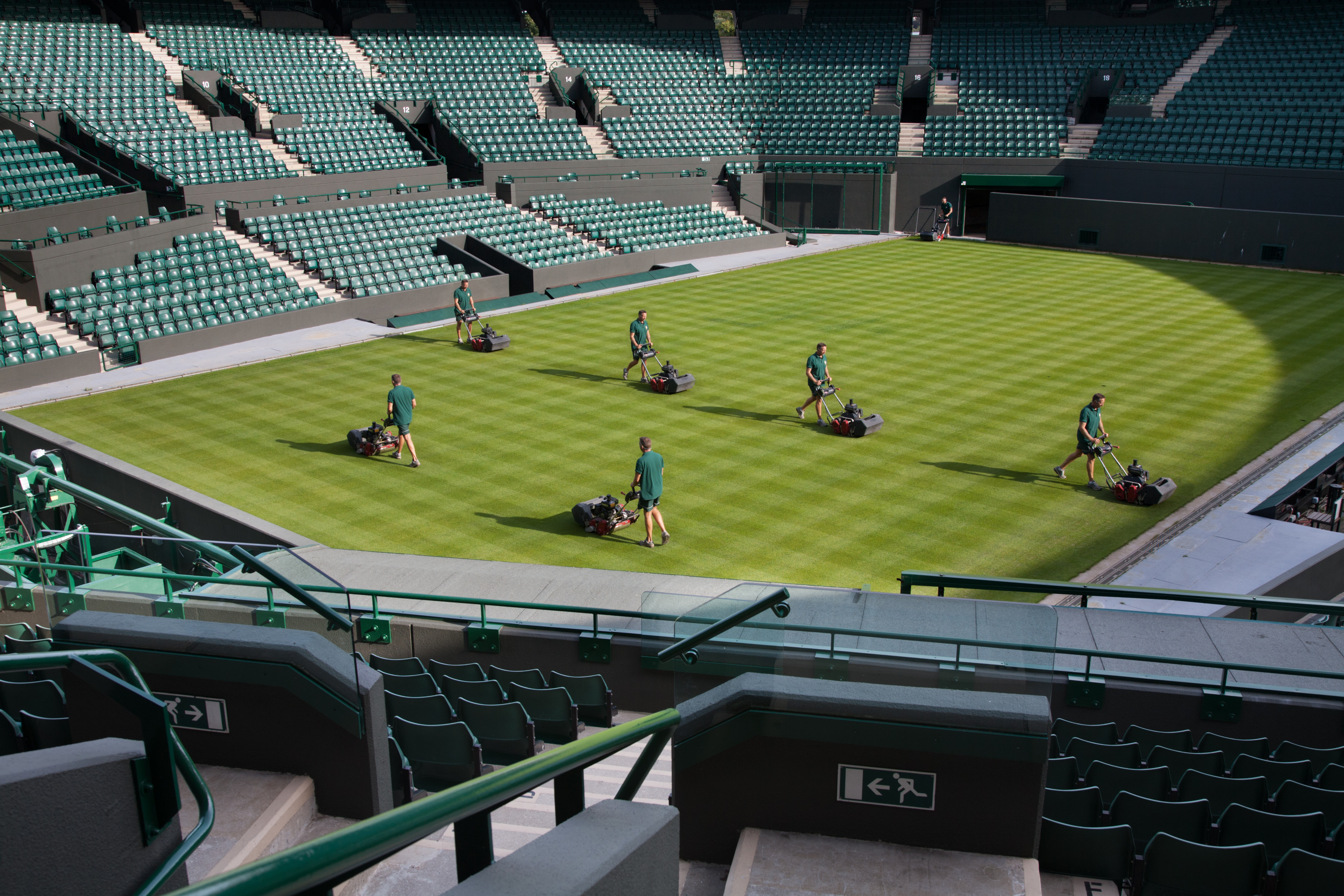
Grass court maintenance at Wimbledon

Grass courts are the fastest type of courts in common use. They consist of grass grown on very hard-packed soil, which adds additional variables: bounces depend on how healthy the grass is, how recently it has been mowed, and the wear and tear of recent play. Points are usually very quick where fast, low bounces keep rallies short, and the serve plays a more important role than on other surfaces. Grass courts thus tend to favour serve-and-volley tennis players.

Grass courts were once among the most common tennis surfaces, but are now rare due to high maintenance costs, as they must be watered and mown often, and take a longer time to dry after rain than hard courts.

Historically for the Grand Slams grass courts have been used at Wimbledon since 1877, the US Open from 1881 to 1974, and the Australian Open from 1905 to 1987.

=== Hard courts ===
Rooftop tennis hardcourts in Downtown Singapore

Hardcourts are made of uniform rigid material, often covered with an acrylic surface layer to offer greater consistency of bounce than other outdoor surfaces. Hardcourts can vary in speed, though they are faster than clay but not as fast as grass courts. The quantity of sand added to the paint can greatly affect the rate at which the ball slows down. As well as acrylic, asphalt and concrete are also examples of hardcourt surfaces.

The US Open is played on Laykold while the Australian Open is played on GreenSet, both acrylic-topped hardcourt surfaces.

Historically for the Grand Slams hardcourts have been used at the US Open since 1978 and the Australian Open since 1988.

=== Carpet courts ===
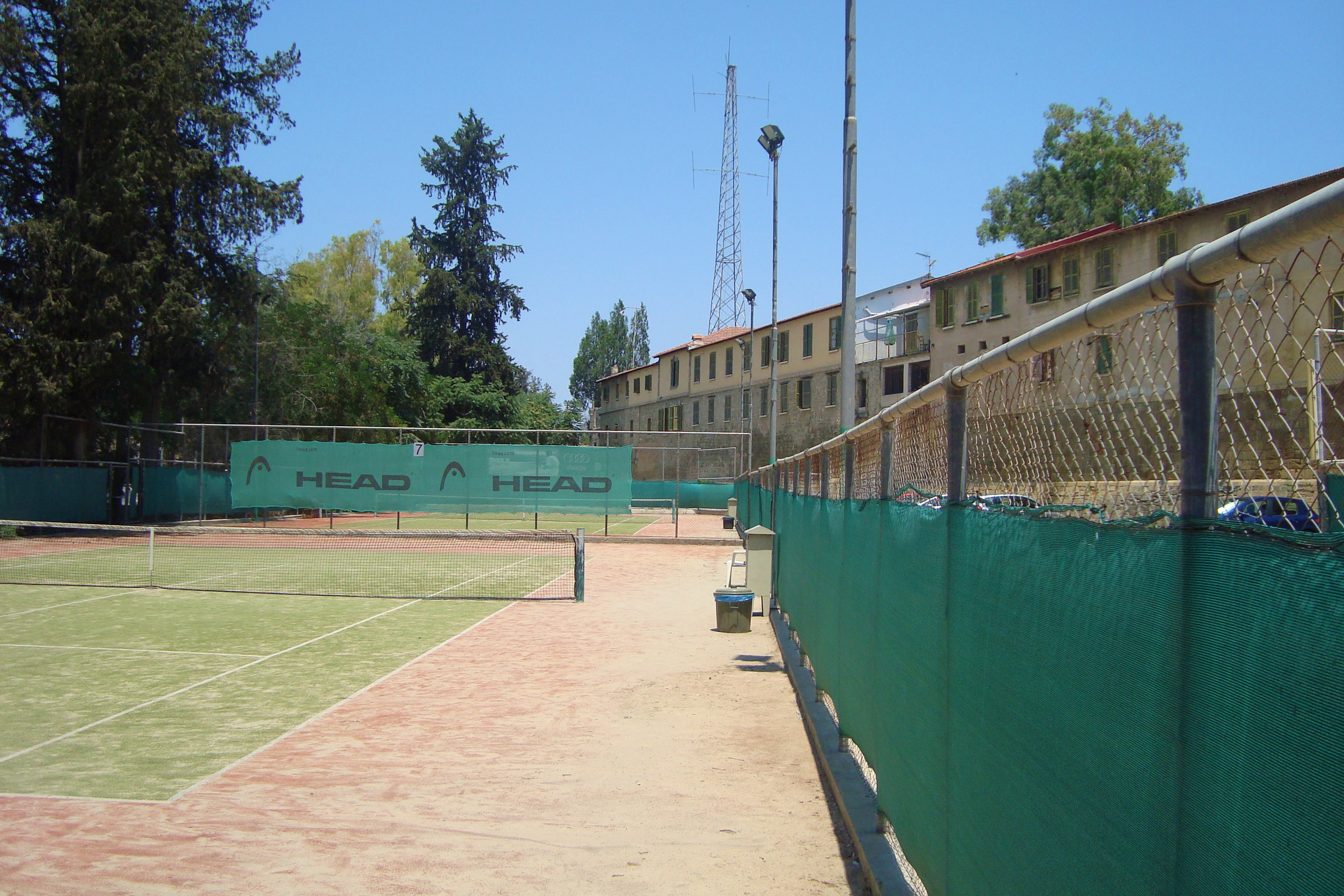
Artificial turf tennis courts in Nicosia, Cyprus

"Carpet" in tennis means any removable court covering. Indoor arenas store rolls of rubber-backed court surfacing and install it temporarily for tennis events, but they are not in use any more for professional events. A short piled form of artificial turf infilled with sand is used for some outdoor courts, particularly in Asia. Carpet is generally a fast surface, faster than hardcourt, with low bounce.

Notable tennis tournaments previously held on carpet courts were the WCT Finals, Paris Masters, U.S. Pro Indoor and Kremlin Cup. Since 2009, their use has been discontinued on the top tier of the ATP. ATP Challenger Tour tournaments such as the Trofeo Città di Brescia still use carpet courts. The WTA Tour's last carpet court event, the International-level Tournoi de Québec, was discontinued after 2018.

== Indoor courts ==
Some tennis courts are indoors, which allows play regardless of weather conditions and is more comfortable for spectators.

Different court surfaces have been used indoors. Hard courts are most common indoors, as they are the easiest to install and maintain. If the installation is permanent, they are constructed on an asphalt or concrete base, as with outdoor courts. Temporary indoor hard courts are typically constructed using wooden floor panels topped with acrylic which are installed over the venue's standard floor. This is the system used for modern indoor professional events such as the ATP Finals.

Clay courts can be installed indoors with subsurface watering systems to keep the clay from drying out, and have been used for Davis Cup matches.

Carpet courts were once the most prominent of indoor surfaces, especially in temporary venues, but have largely been replaced by removable hard courts. They were used on both the ATP World Tour and World Championship Tennis circuits, though no events currently use them.

Historically, other surfaces have been used indoors such as wood courts at the defunct World Covered Court Championships and London Indoor Professional Championships.

The conclusion of the Wimbledon Championships, in 2012, was played on the lawn of Centre Court under the closed roof and artificial lights; the Halle Open has also seen a number of matches played on its grass court in the Gerry Weber Stadion with the roof closed. These, however, are outdoor venues with retractable roofs.

== Gallery ==
Below are photographs of a number of different surfaces, each featuring their relevant ITF surface code:

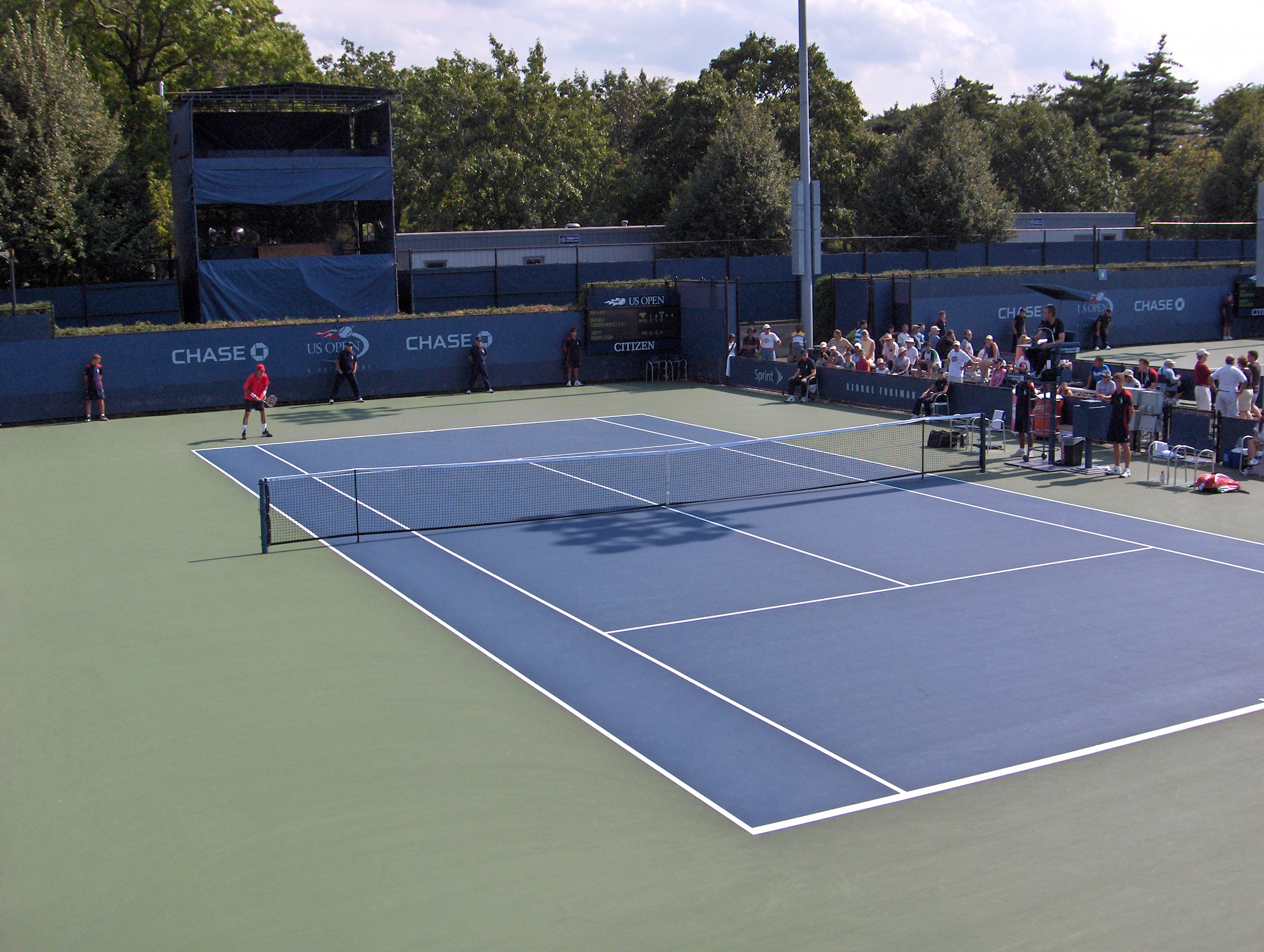
Code A: Acrylic (DecoTurf)

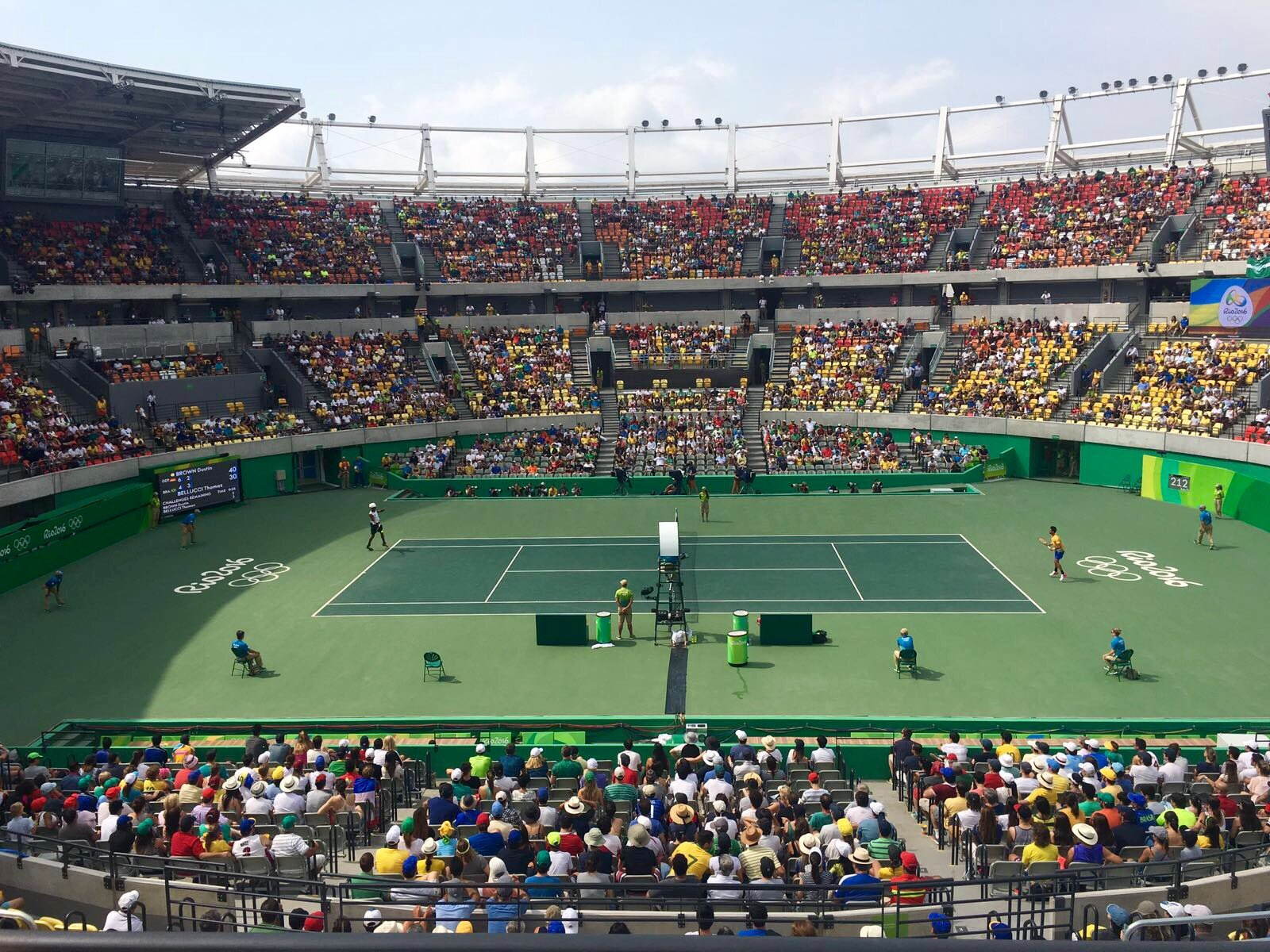
Code A: Acrylic (GreenSet)

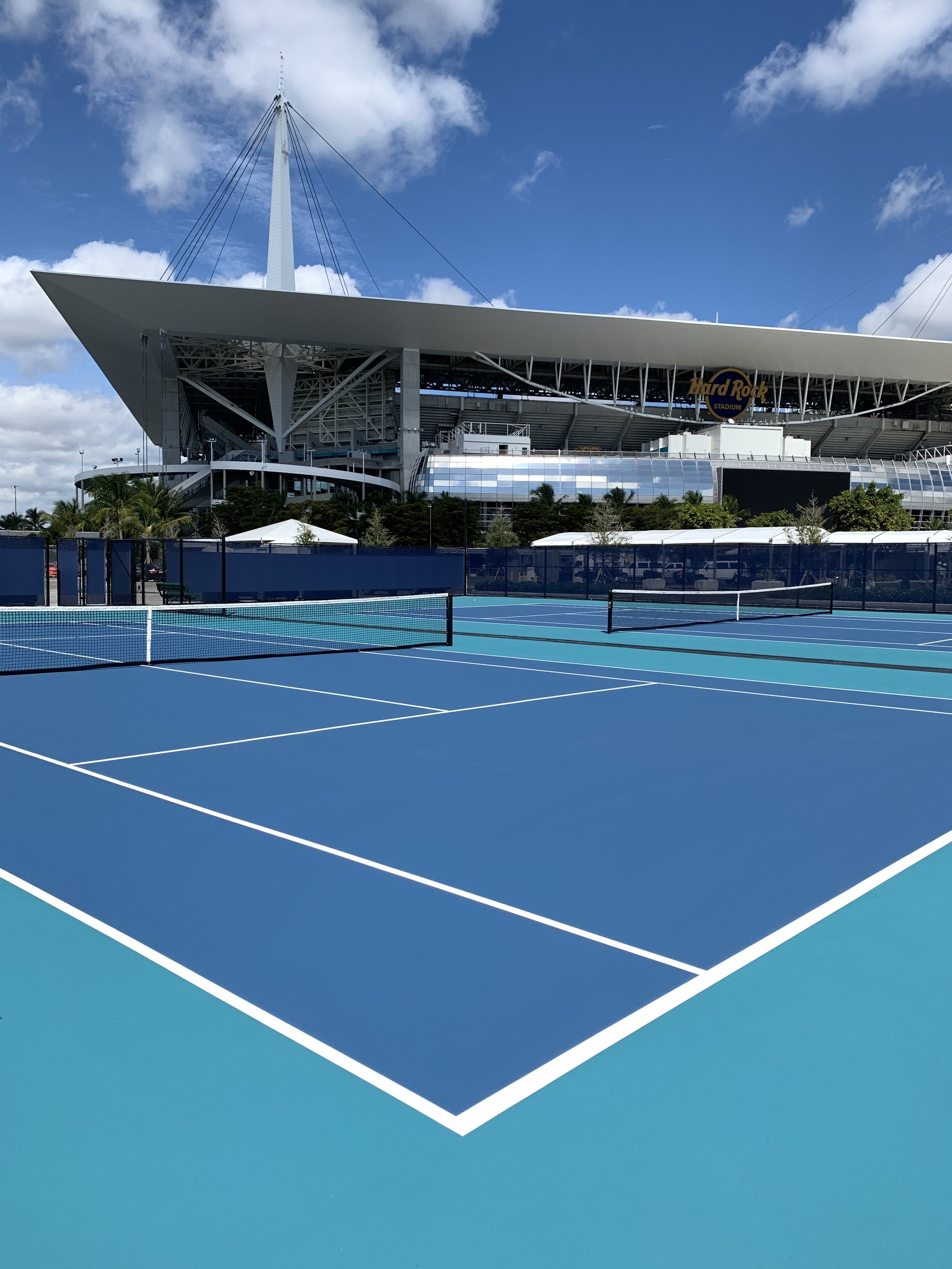
Code A: Acrylic (Laykold)

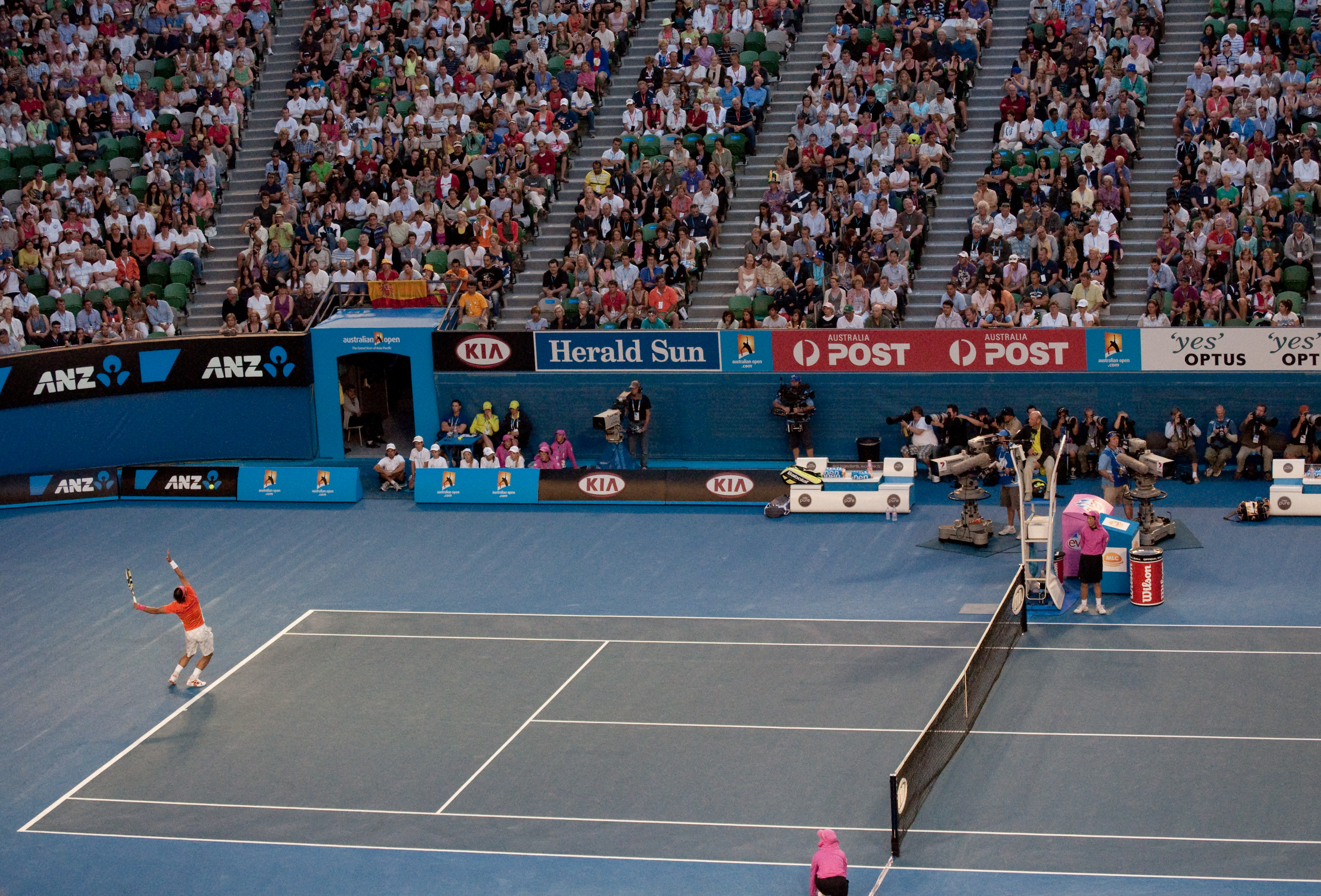
Code A: Acrylic (Plexicushion)

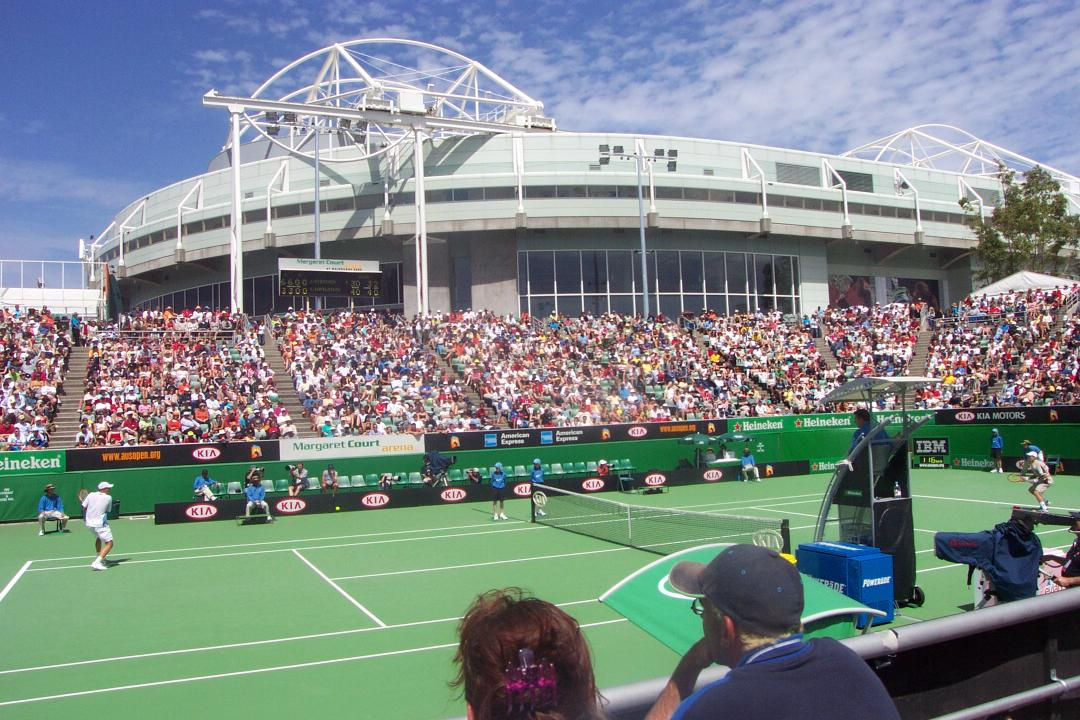
Code A: Acrylic (Rebound Ace)

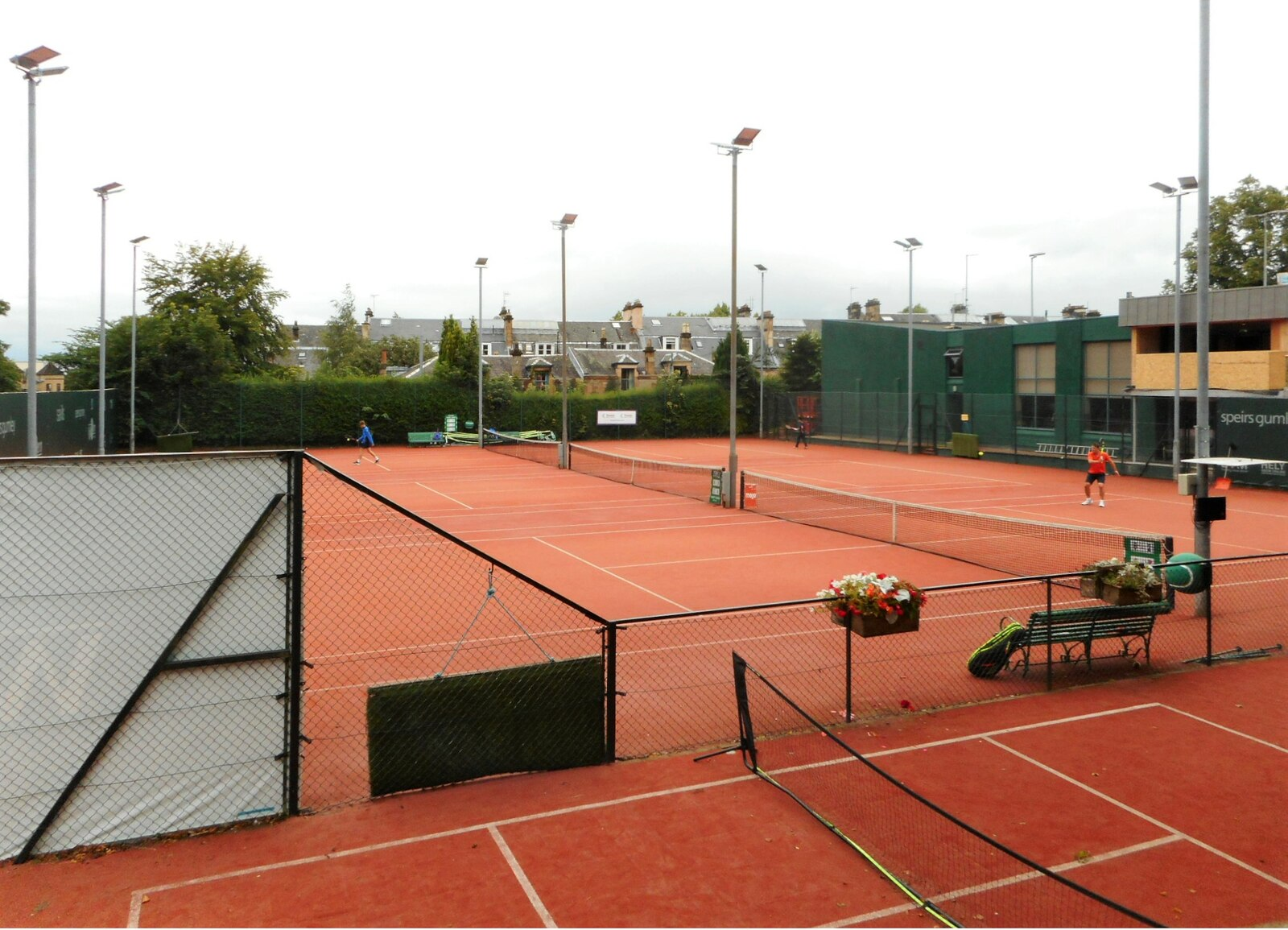
Code B: Artificial clay

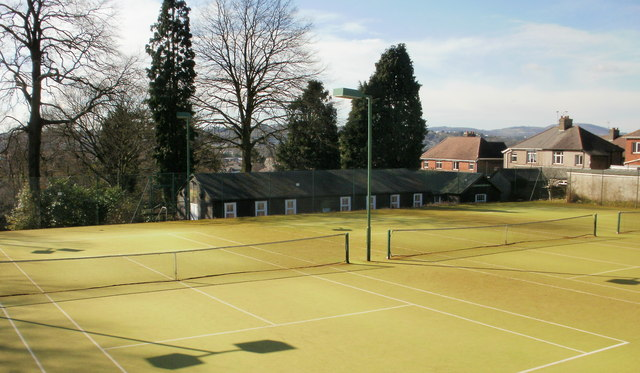
Code C: Artificial grass

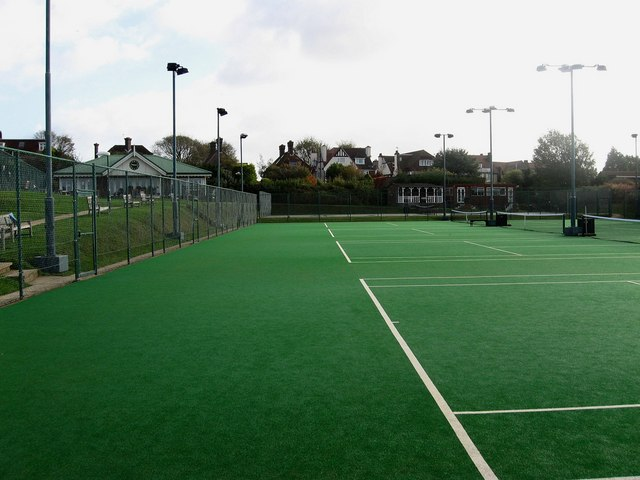
Code C: Artificial grass

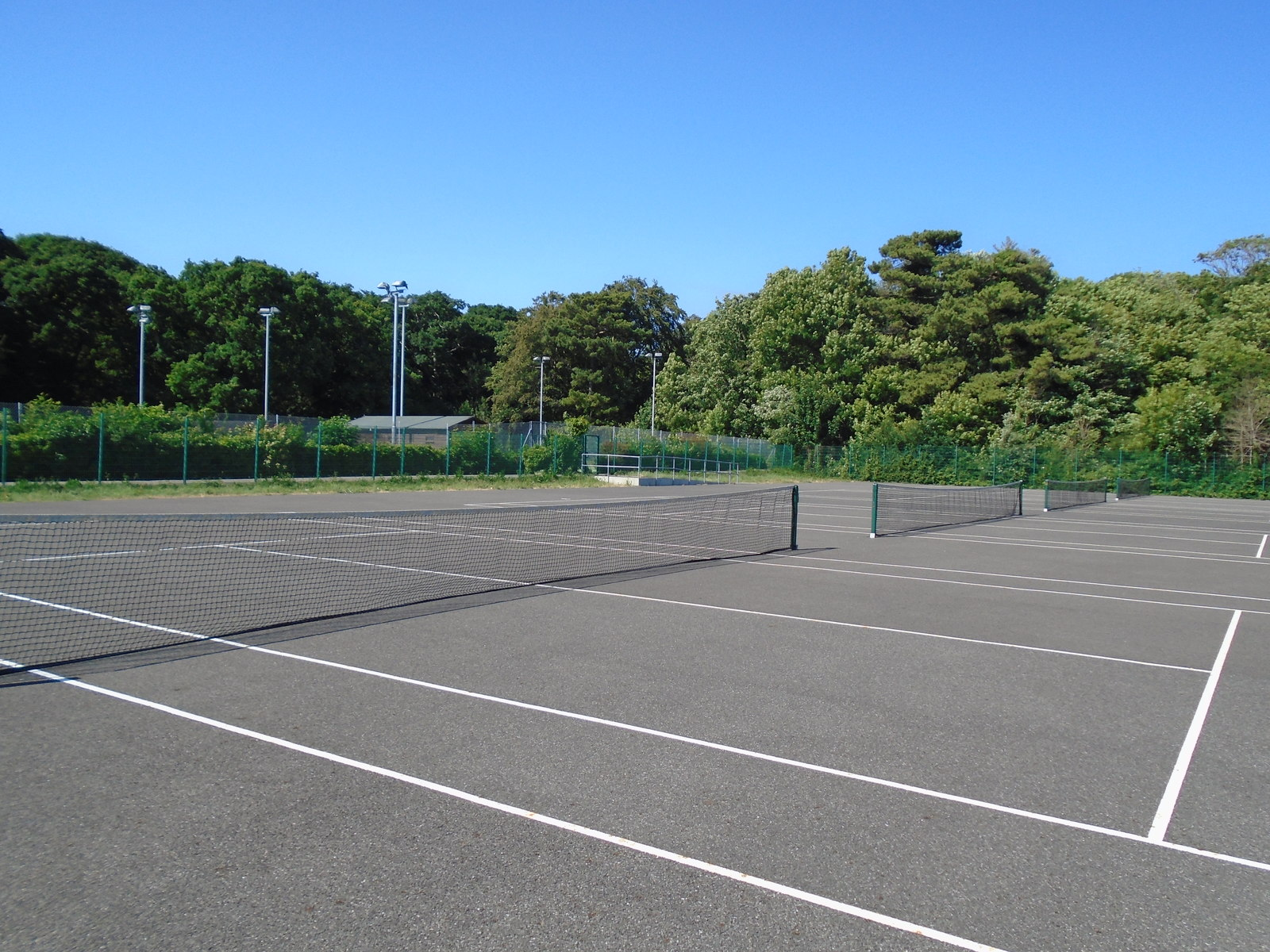
Code D: Asphalt

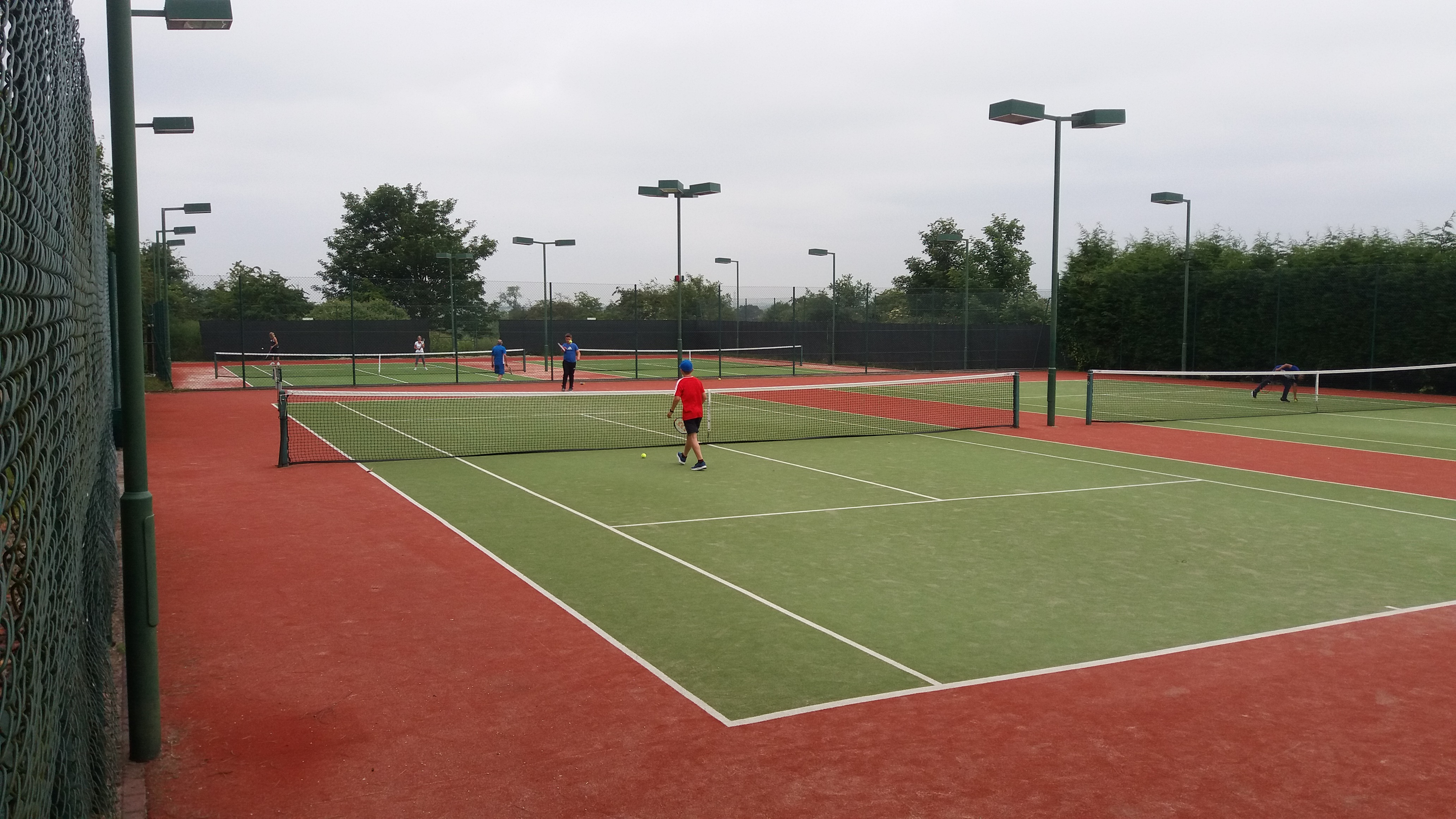
Code E: Carpet (outdoor; sand turf)

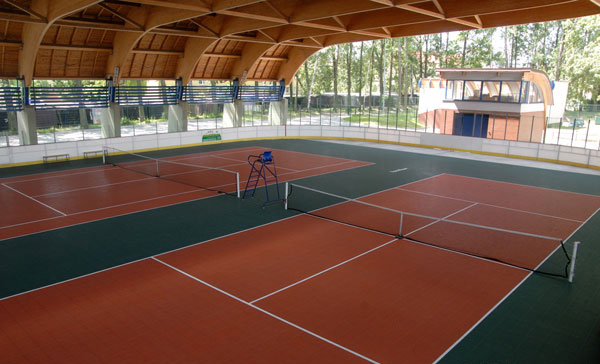
Code E: Carpet (indoor; textile)

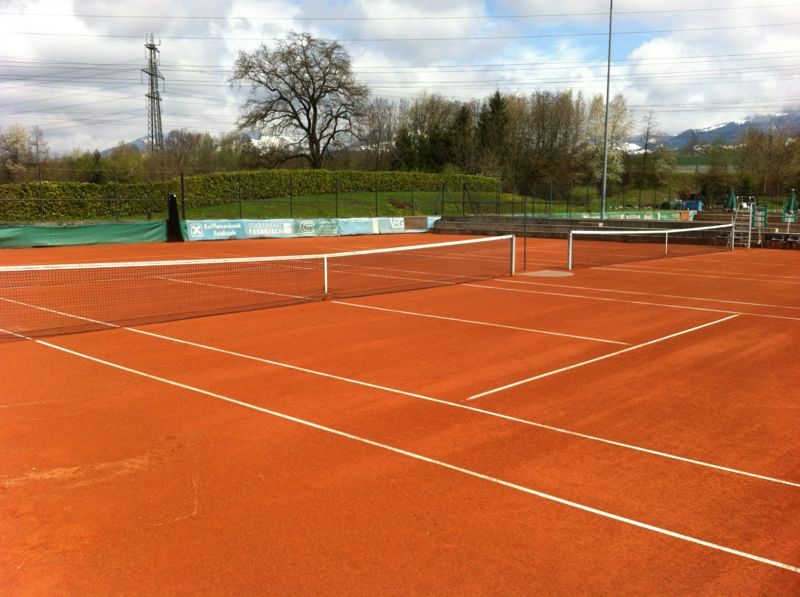
Code F: Clay (brick; i.e., terre battue)

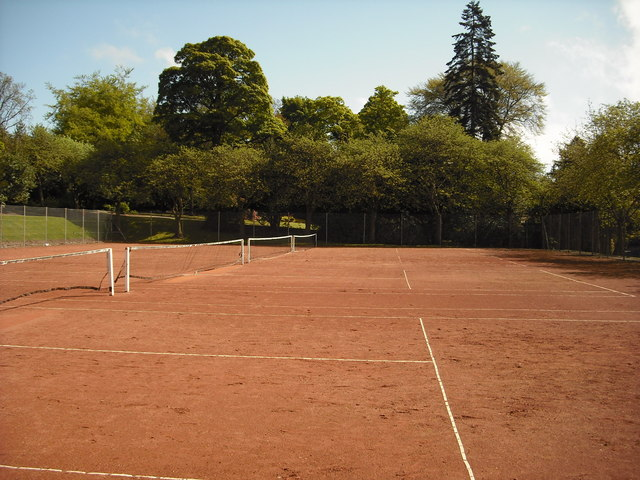
Code F: Clay (shale or "blaes")

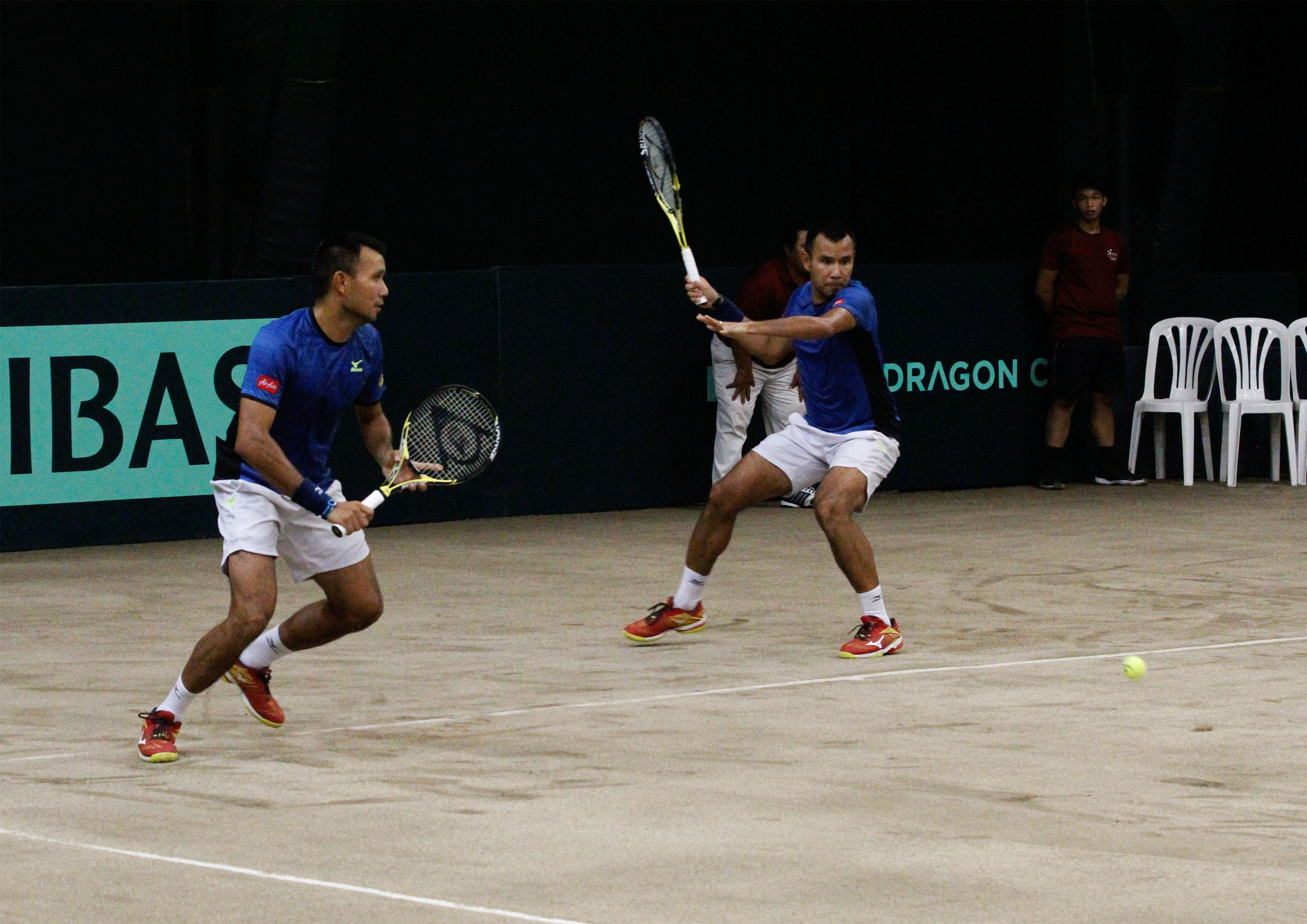
Code F: Clay (shell)

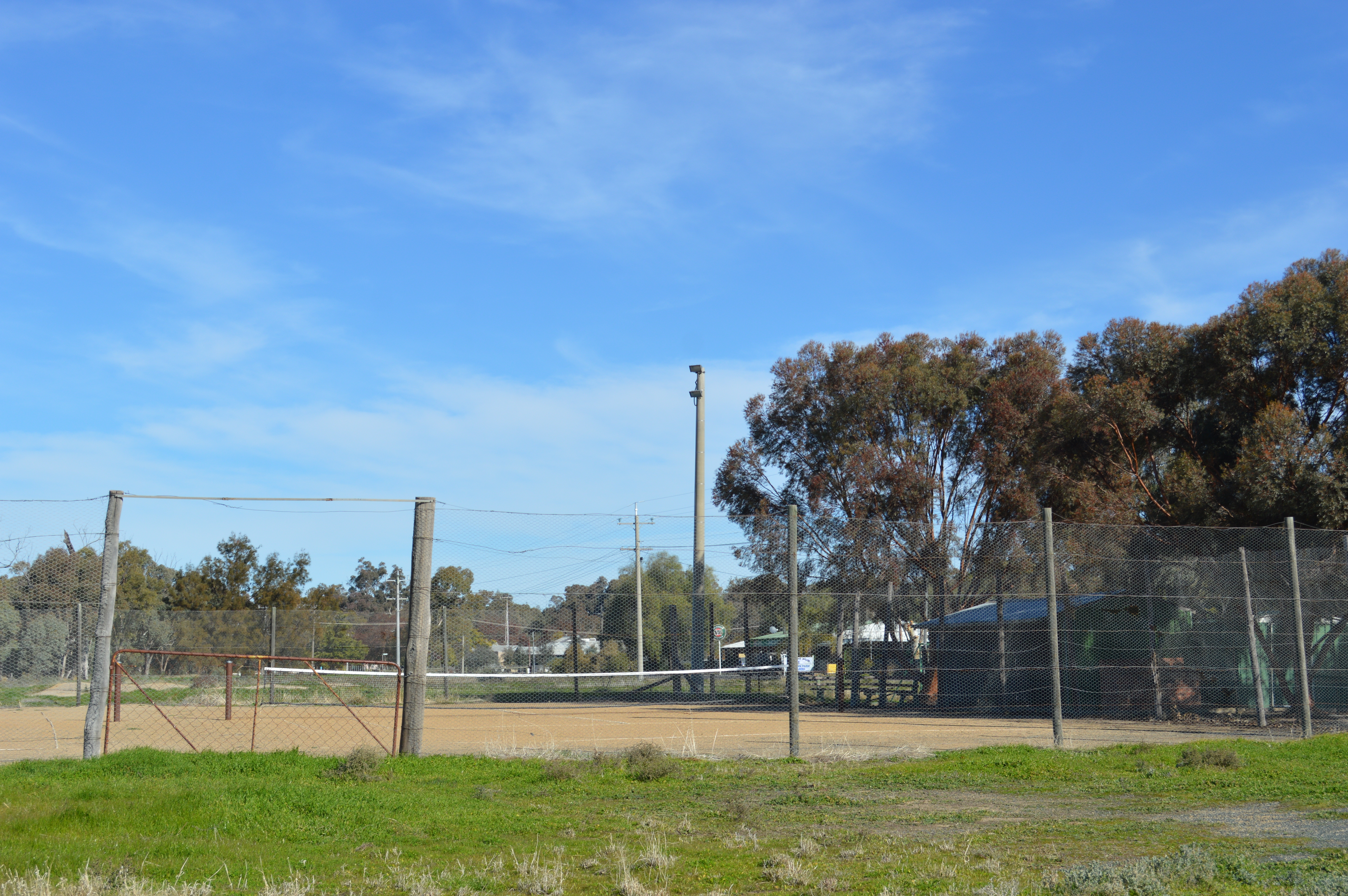
Code F: Clay (antbed)

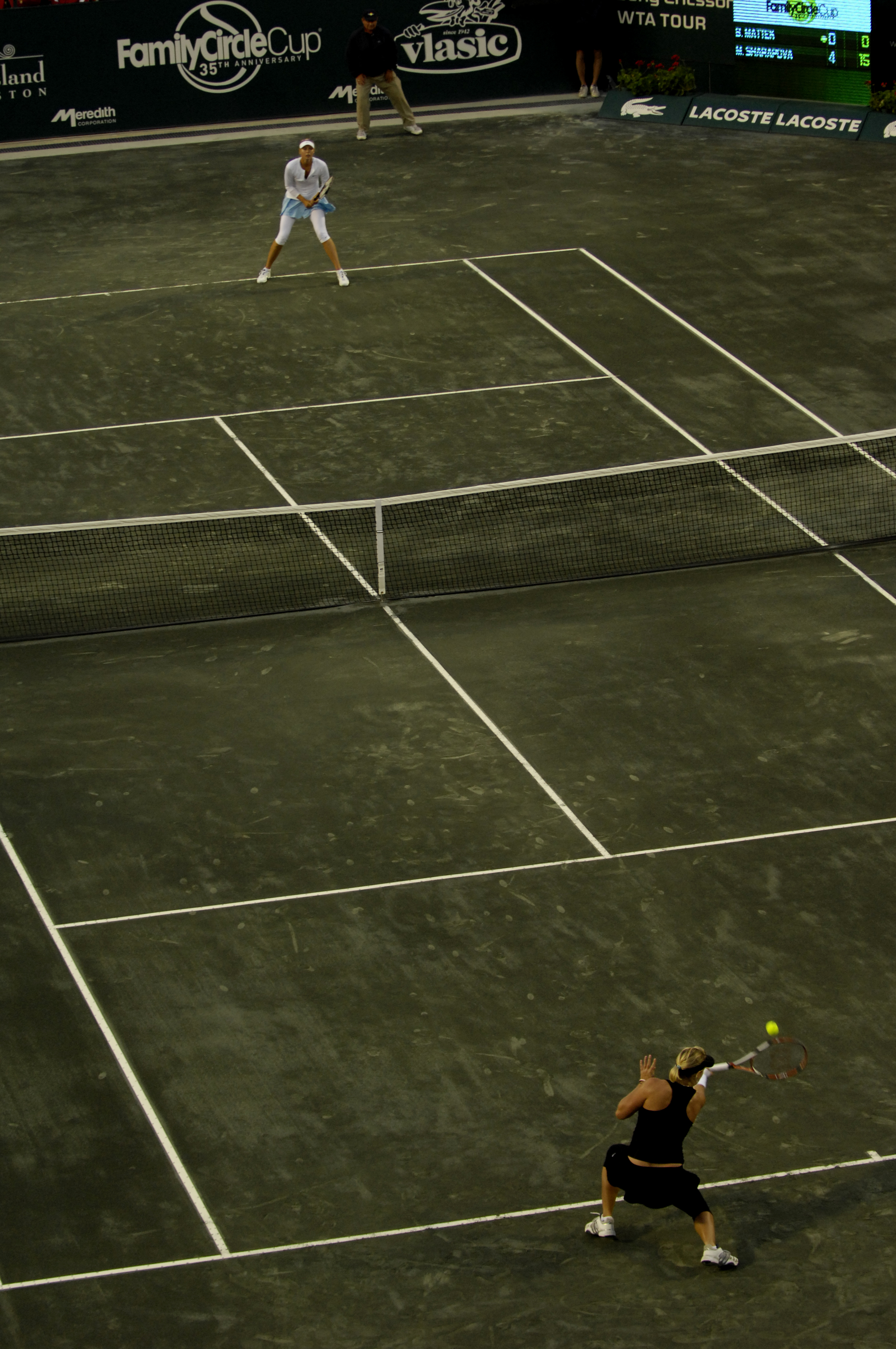
Code F: Clay (green HarTru)

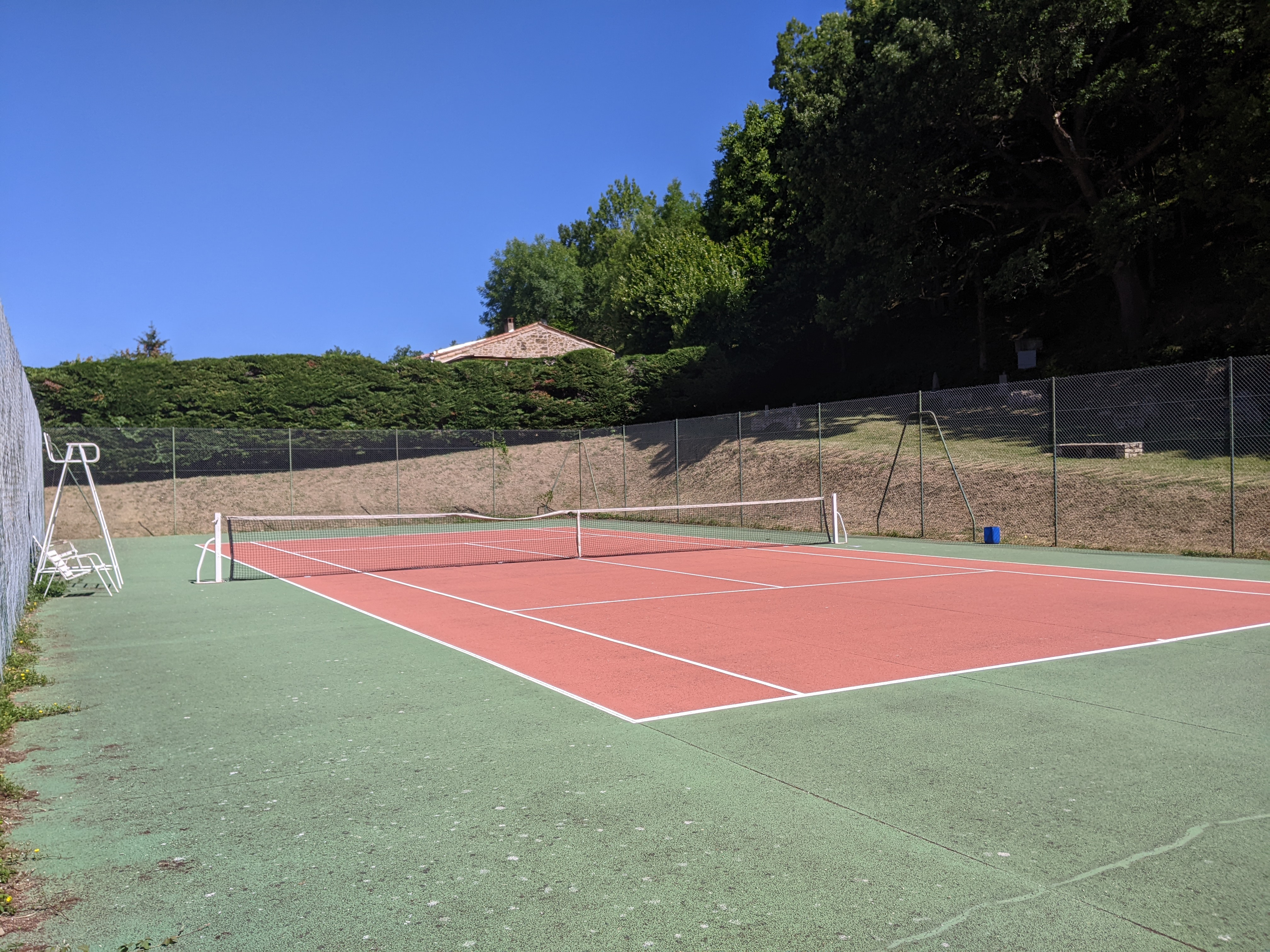
Code G: Concrete

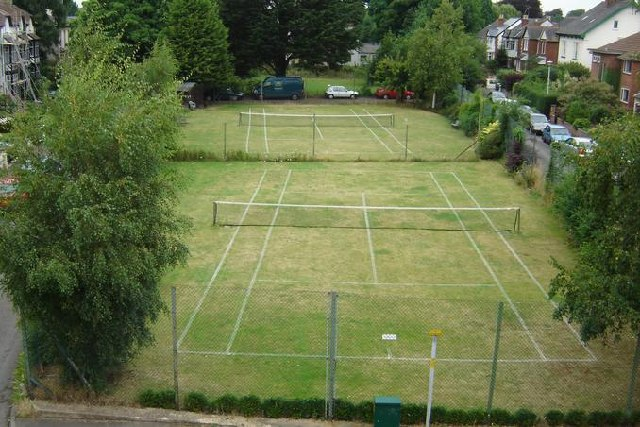
Code H: Grass

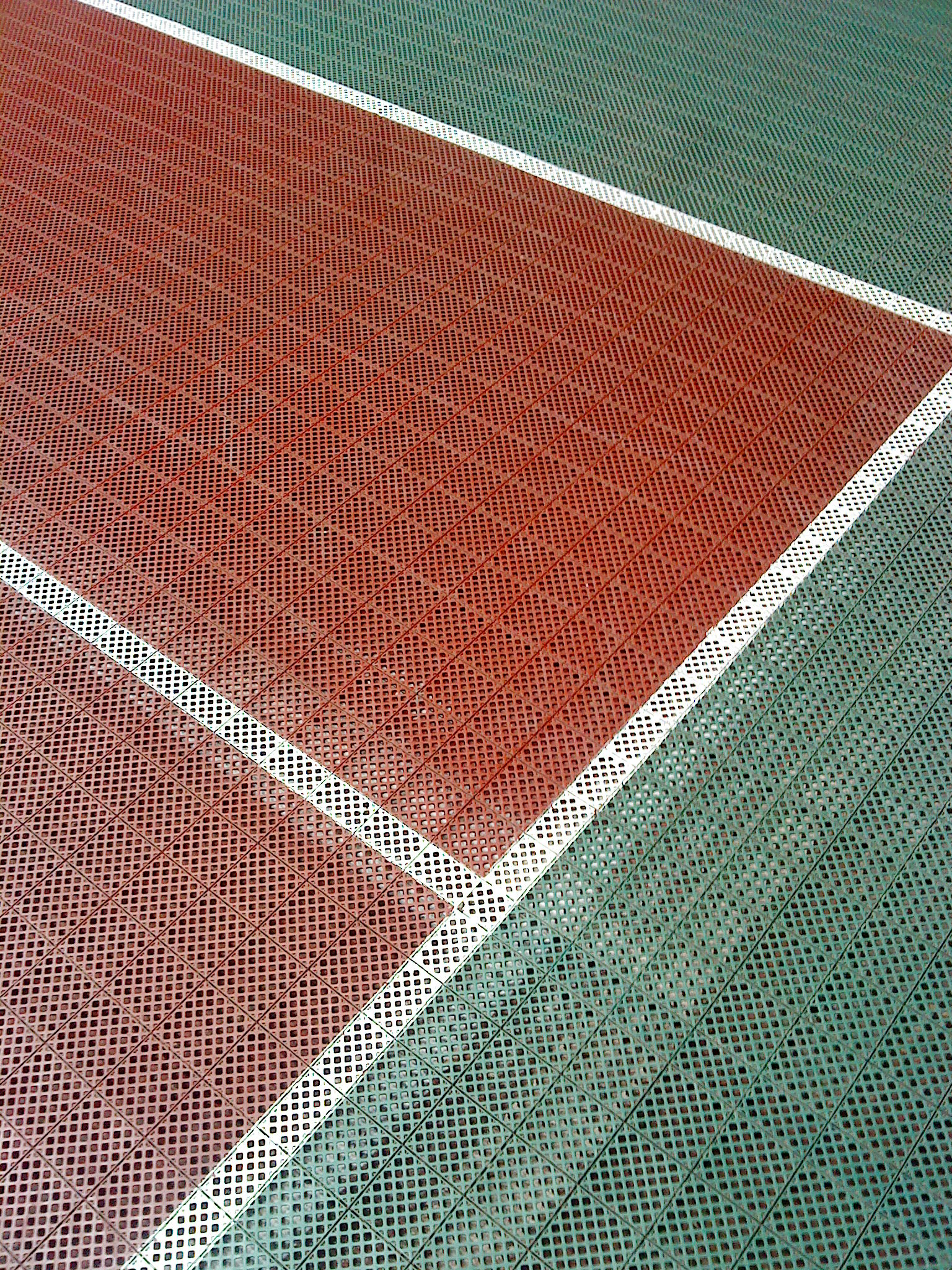
Code J: Tile

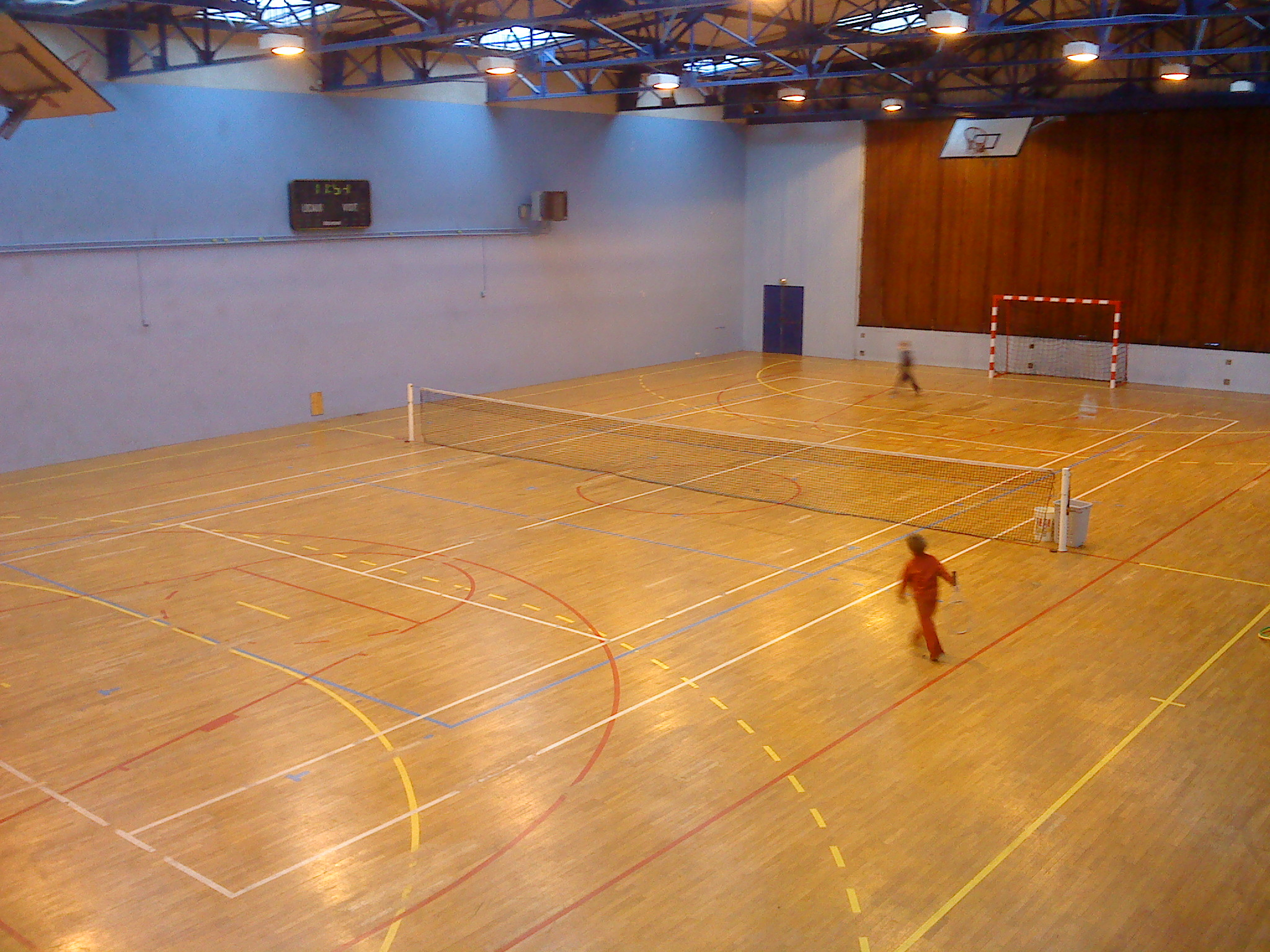
Code J: Wood (indoor)

== Terminology ==
Common tennis court terms:

- Advantage service box or ad court: The receiver's left side service box, or the opponent's right for the server; significant as the receiving side for an advantage point.
- Alley or Tramlines: The lanes on each side of the singles court. These are only used when playing doubles.
- Back court: The area between the baseline and the service line.
- Baseline: The rearmost line of the court, furthest from and parallel to the net.
- Center service line: The line dividing the two service boxes on each side.
- Center mark: The 4-inch mark at the halfway point of the baseline used to distinguish the two halves (and service boxes) of a tennis court.
- Deuce service box or deuce court: The receiver's right side service box, or the opponent's left for the server, significant as the receiving side for a deuce point.
- Service box: The area on each side bounded by the singles sideline, the service line, and the net. There are left and right service boxes, separated by the center service line.
- Service line: The line that is parallel to the net and is located between the baseline and the net. It marks the end of the service boxes.
- Side T: The T shape formed by the service line and the singles sideline. There are four such side Ts, two on each side of the net.
- T or Middle T: The T shape formed by the service line and the center service line.

== See also ==
- List of tennis stadiums by capacity
- No-line court
