= Rod Laver Arena =

Arena in Melbourne

- The Tennis Centre

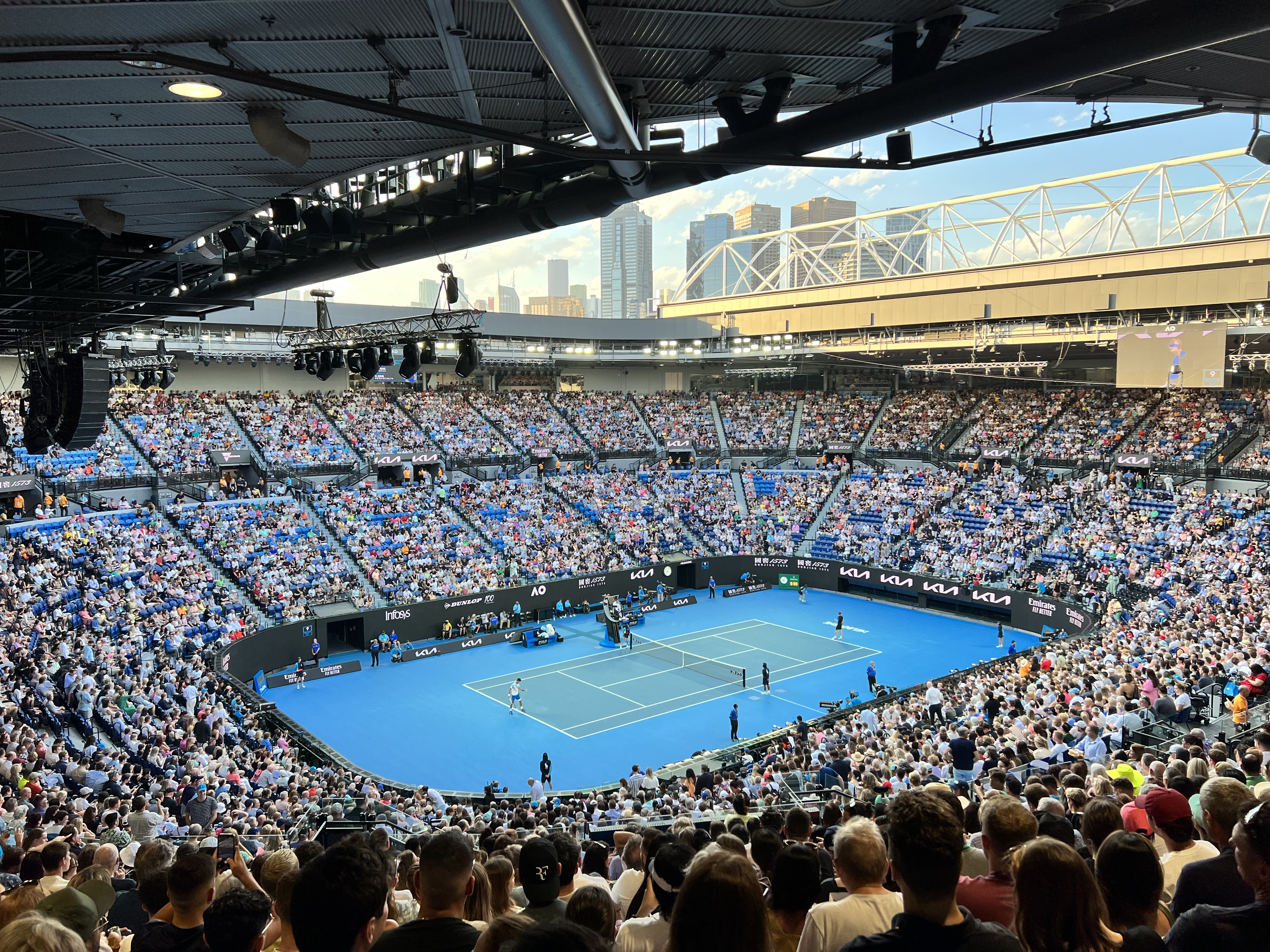
- Rod Laver Arena at a night session of the 2023 Australian Open
- Interactive map of Rod Laver Arena
- Full name: Rod Laver Arena at Melbourne Park
- Former names: National Tennis Centre at Flinders Park (1988–1996); Centre Court (1996–2000)
- Address: 200 Batman Avenue; Melbourne, Victoria, Australia
- Location: Melbourne Park
- Coordinates: 37°49′18″S 144°58′42″E
- Owner: Government of Victoria
- Operator: Melbourne and Olympic Park Trust
- Capacity: 14,820
- Surface: Rebound Ace (1988–2007) (tennis); Plexicushion (2008–2018) (tennis); GreenSet (2019–present) (tennis); Hardwood (basketball)
- Record attendance: ~26000 – Intel Extreme Masters Melbourne 2025, Counter-Strike 2 tournament

Construction
- Groundbreaking: 1985
- Opened: 11 January 1988
- Renovated: 1995
- Cost: A$94 million (Original) ($305 million in 2022 dollars) $23 million (1996 renovations) ($45 million in 2022 dollars)
- Architects: Peddle Thorp Learmonth; Cox Architecture
- Main contractor: Civil & Civic

Tenants
- Australian Open (1988–present); Melbourne Tigers (1992–2000); South East Melbourne Magic (1992–1998); Victoria Titans (1998–2000); Major sporting events hosted; 2006 Commonwealth Games gymnastics

Website
- Venue Website

Rod Laver Arena is a multipurpose arena located within Melbourne Park, in Melbourne, Victoria, Australia. The arena is the main venue for the Australian Open, the first Grand Slam tennis tournament of the calendar year.

== History ==
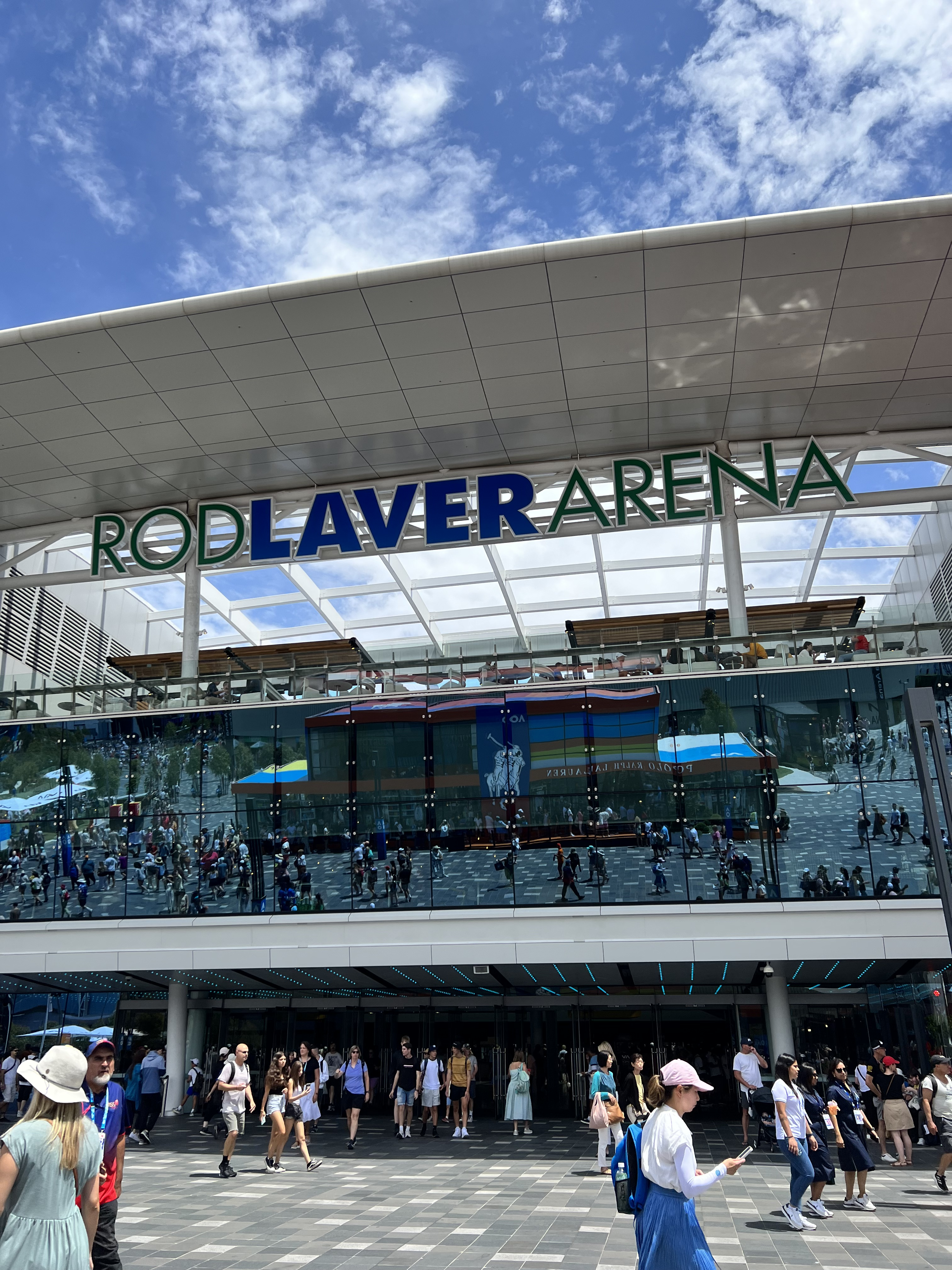
Rod Laver Arena entrance in 2023.

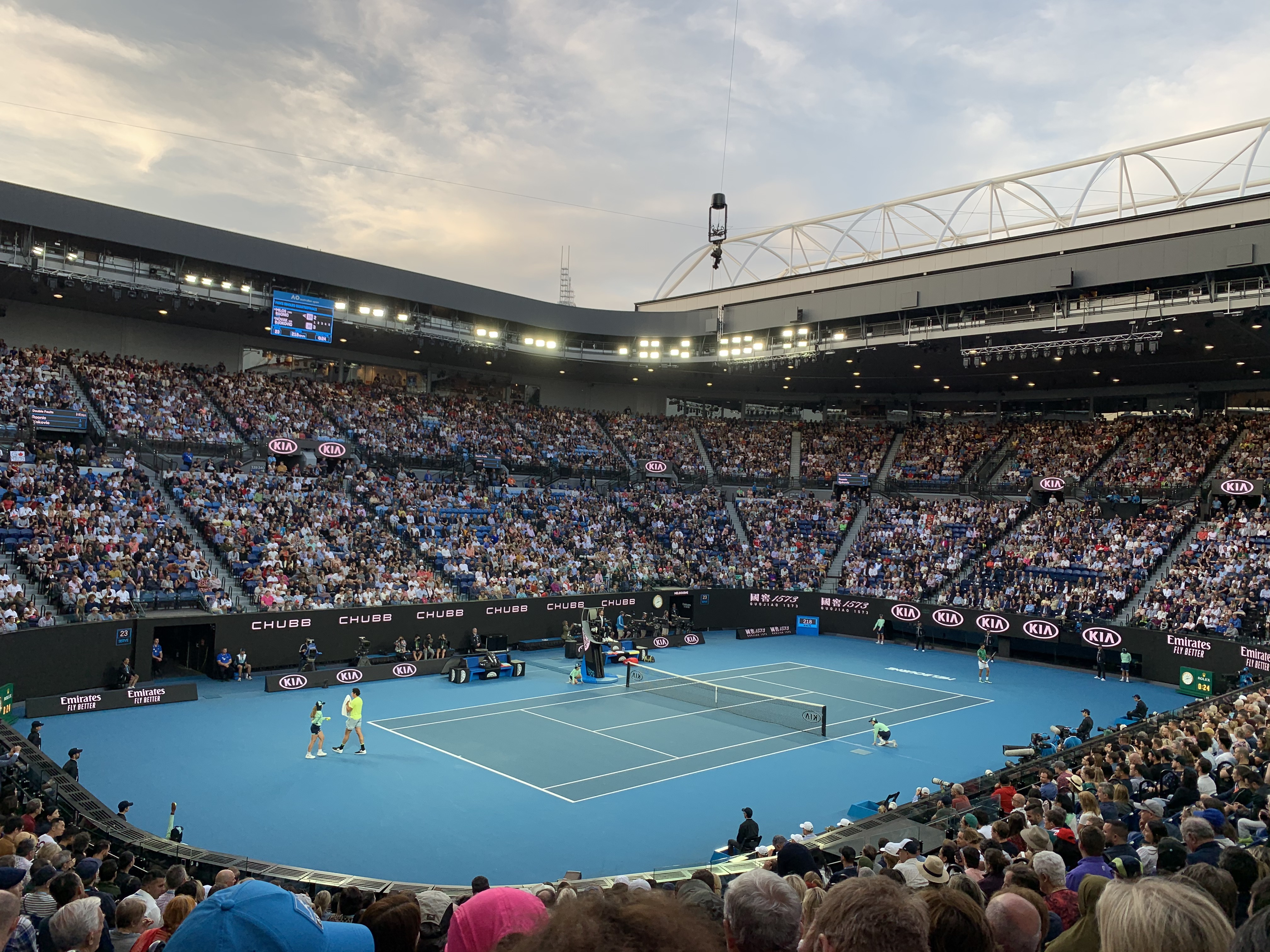
Interior of arena during the 2020 Australian Open

Replacing the aging Kooyong Stadium, construction on the arena began in 1985. It was undertaken by Civil & Civic and was completed in 1987 at a cost of AU$94 million. It opened on 11 January 1988 for the 1988 Australian Open.

Originally known in 1988 as the National Tennis Centre at Flinders Park, the arena has officially changed its name twice. First in 1996, when it was known as the Centre Court, and again on 16 January 2000 to honour Rod Laver, a three-time winner of the Australian Open and one of the world's greatest tennis players.

== Features ==
Rod Laver Arena has a seating capacity of 14,820, with a capacity of 15,400 for sports such as basketball, when extra seats are added around the court, and up to 14,200 for concerts with floor seating. The arena currently attracts over 1.5 million visitors per year.

The arena was the first tennis venue in the world and the first arena of any kind in Australia to have a retractable roof installed. The idea for such a roof came about at the suggestion of the Premier of Victoria, John Cain, around 1980, who came up with the compromise idea after Tennis Australia requested the government to build an open-air tennis facility next to a preexisting government project to build a closed-roof entertainment centre.

The Rod Laver Arena is the largest indoor arena in Australia without a permanent roof (not counting the 56,347 seat Docklands Stadium, also in Melbourne, which is classed as a stadium rather than an arena). It is also the second largest indoor arena in Australia behind the 21,032 capacity Sydney SuperDome. The arena's retractable roof allows competitors to continue play during rain or extreme heat.

Rod Laver Arena is equipped with the Hawk-Eye Live line-calling system which has been used in place of line judges since the 2021 Australian Open.

== Sports and events ==
Rod Laver Arena is the focal point of the Australian Open at Melbourne Park, and besides tennis, the arena has hosted basketball, motorbike super-crosses, music concerts, conferences, professional wrestling events and ballet. Other than for tennis, during sporting events or concerts, a section of the southern lower seating bowl is retracted to allow space for a stage or special floor level seating.

=== Tennis ===
Rod Laver Arena acts as the centre court for the Australian Open tennis championships every year. The player after whom the arena is named, Rod Laver, is a frequent guest of honour at Championships and has presented the trophy to the men's singles champion on several occasions. Laver is widely considered the best player of his generation and amongst the best players of all time. (Note: See)

Rod Laver Arena was the scene for Australia's famous Davis Cup victories in 2003. The arena hosted the semi-final and Final, at which Australia was successful in recording their 28th Davis Cup title.

=== Basketball ===
Aside from tennis, the sport most often held at Rod Laver Arena in the past was basketball. The arena's first basketball game was in 1991 when the Australian Boomers played host to a touring All-Star team headlined by Kareem Abdul-Jabbar, with over 15,000 in attendance.

On 3 April 1992, the arena became the home of Melbourne basketball when the Melbourne Tigers (now known as Melbourne United) defeated the Canberra Cannons 112–104. The venue was actually criticised in its early days as a basketball venue due to the poor quality of the backboards and rings used. However, these concerns were quickly addressed and the arena became known as one of the best in the country, especially with anywhere near a full house in attendance. The arena was also home to the South East Melbourne Magic (later renamed the Victoria Titans in 1998 after merging with the North Melbourne Giants) with both teams attracting some of the largest crowds in the history of the NBL. Rod Laver Arena was also the site of the first ever "outdoor" pro basketball game in Australia when the Magic hosted the Adelaide 36ers on 31 December 1997 with the roof open.

The largest basketball crowd at Rod Laver Arena was set in 1996 when 15,366 attended a local derby game between the Magic and Tigers. This remains the second largest NBL basketball attendance ever in Australia behind the 17,803 who attended a game between the Sydney Kings and West Sydney Razorbacks at the Sydney SuperDome in 1999. Game two of the 1996 NBL Grand Final series, also between the Magic and Tigers, saw the NBL's largest ever single game Grand Final crowd when 15,064 watched the Magic defeat the Tigers 88–84.

1992 saw the first time two teams from the one city had reached the NBL Grand Final series when the Magic faced fellow Melbourne Park tenants the Tigers. With all games being played at the league's largest venue a record aggregate of 43,605 (average 14,535) fans saw the Magic win their first championship two games to one, coming back to win games two and three 115–93 and 95–88 after losing game one 98–116.

In all, Rod Laver Arena hosted 287 NBL games including NBL Championship deciders in 1992, 1996, 1997 and 1999, and played host to its last game in April 2000 before Melbourne Arena opened in 2000 and became the new home of basketball in Melbourne. The arena hosted the Australian Boomers on numerous occasions, including playing against the Magic Johnson All-Stars in 1995, as well as hosting the 1997 FIBA Under-22 World Championship, which Australia won for the first time. The arena also played host to the 1993 NBL All-Star Game with the NBL Stars defeating the Boomers 124–119.

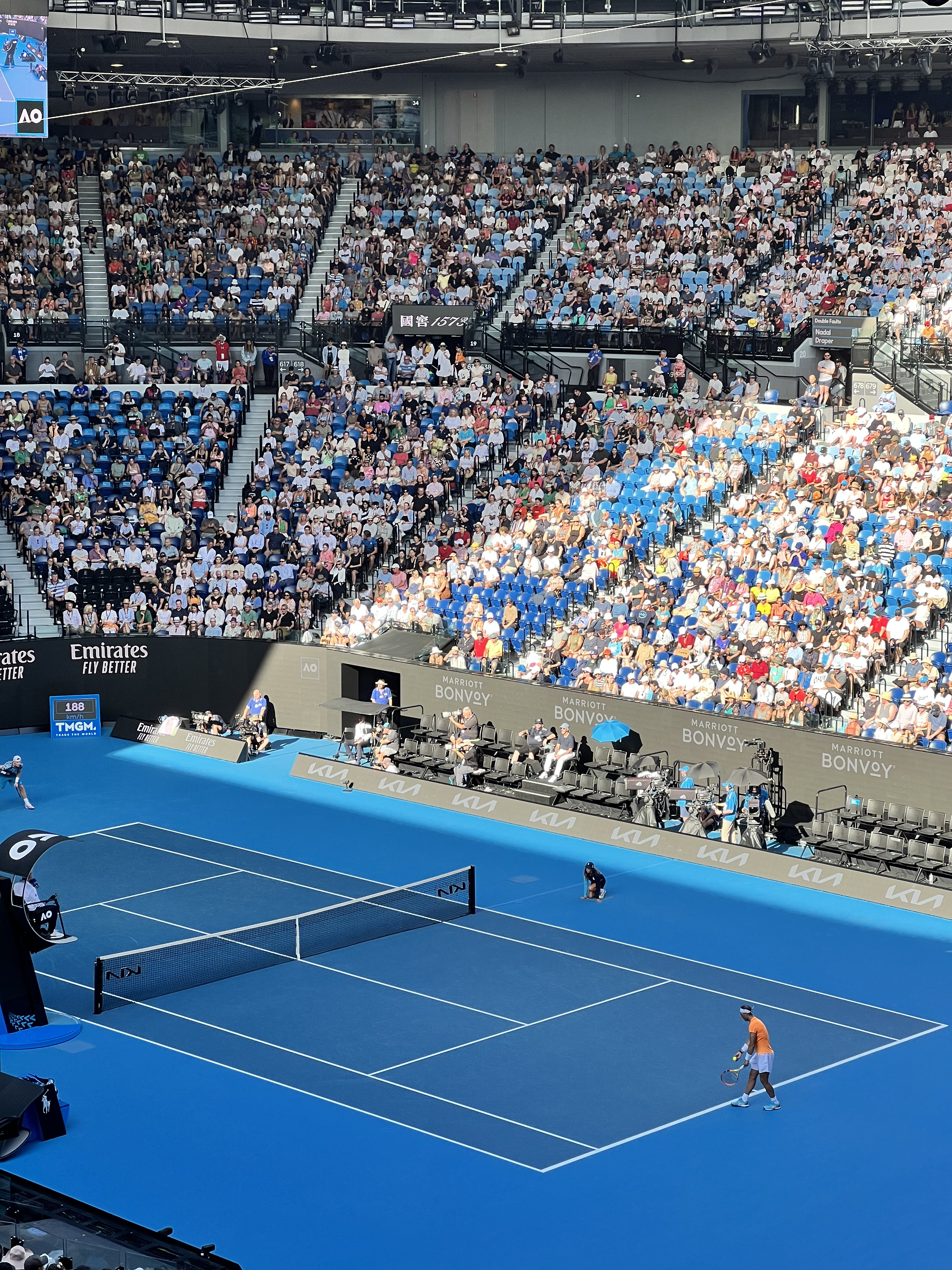
Day match at the 2023 Australian Open

On 15 August 2015, Rod Laver Arena played host to the opening game of the 2015 FIBA Men's Oceania Basketball Championship between the Australian Boomers and the New Zealand Tall Blacks. In front of 15,062 fans Australia ran out 71–59 winners.

On 11 March 2025, the National Basketball Association, the National Basketball League and the Victoria State Government announced that the New Orleans Pelicans of the NBA would play two pre-season exhibition basketball games at Rod Laver Arena, as part of the NBA x NBL: Melbourne Series. The Pelicans played Melbourne United on 3 October 2025, and the South East Melbourne Phoenix on 5 October 2025.

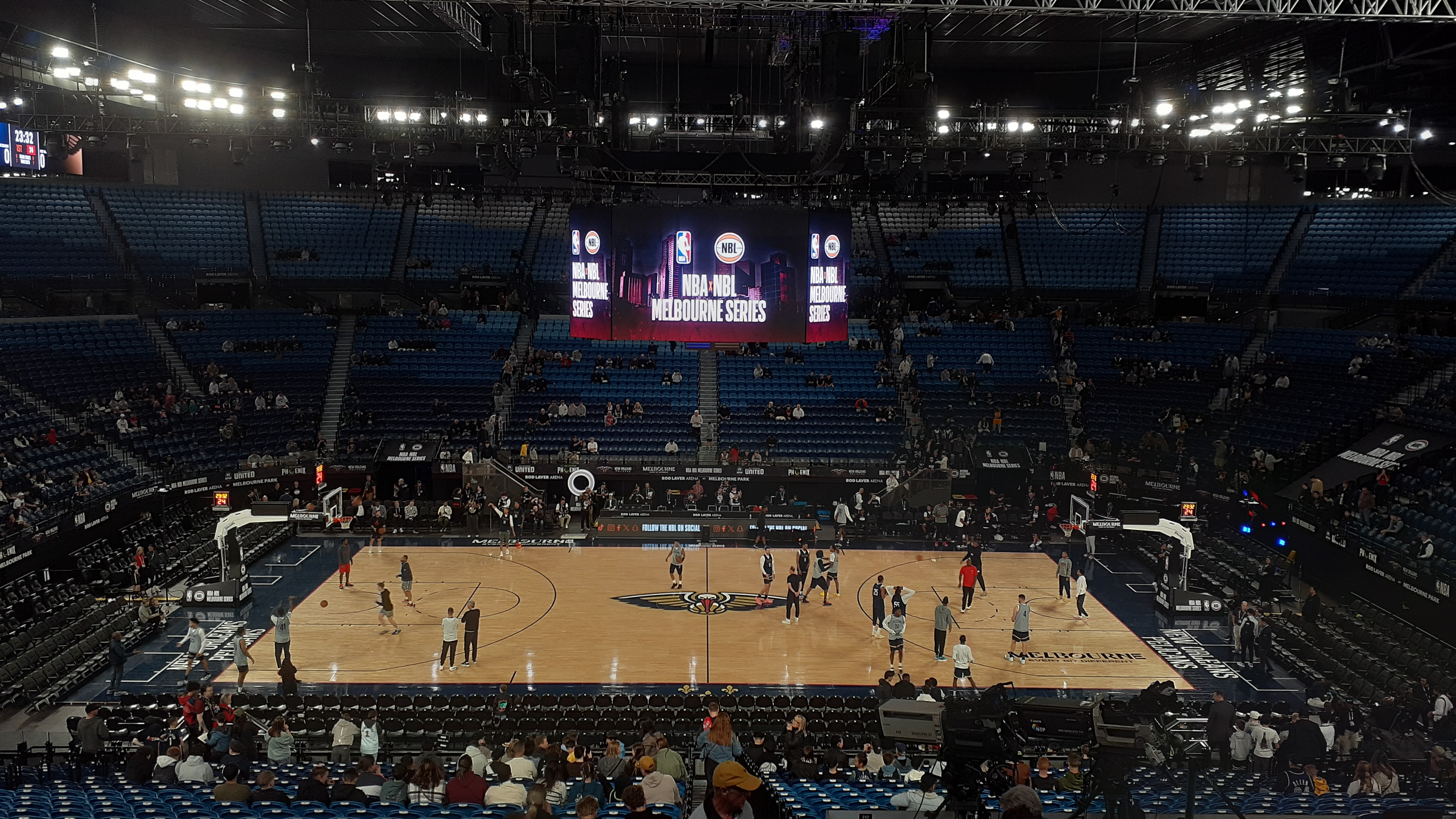
Rod Laver Arena during the NBAxNBL Melbourne Series

=== Swimming ===
Rod Laver Arena was the focal point of the 12th FINA World Aquatics Championships, which were held from 17 March to 1 April 2007. A temporary swimming pool, named the Susie O'Neill Pool after Australian swimming champion Susie O'Neill, was built at significant cost.

=== Commonwealth Games ===
Rod Laver was the host venue for the gymnastics competition at the 2006 Commonwealth Games.

=== Other sports ===
The venue has hosted professional wrestling events such as World Wrestling Entertainment, World Championship Wrestling, World Wrestling All-Stars and World Cup skateboarding. In July 2012, the venue hosted its first netball match, when the Melbourne Vixens were forced to move a home semi-final to the arena after their usual home venue was booked for a concert. On 10 February 2019, the venue hosted UFC 234: Adesanya vs. Silva. On September 23 and 24, 2023, the arena hosted National Hockey League (NHL) pre-season ice hockey when the Arizona Coyotes faced the Los Angeles Kings.

=== Esports ===
Rod Laver Arena was one of the host venues, along with Margaret Court Arena and Melbourne Arena, for the second Melbourne Esports Open on the weekend of 31 August to 1 September 2019. It featured three major regional esports tournaments across League of Legends, Overwatch and Rainbow Six Siege.

Rod Laver Arena hosted the playoffs of the Intel Extreme Masters Melbourne 2025 tournament for Counter-Strike 2, from 25 to 27 April 2025. Which later became the most viewed tournament in Australia With 1.25M view peaked during stream

=== Concerts ===
Rod Laver Arena consistently hosts many of Melbourne's highest-profile musical and entertainment concerts. In 2009, the arena polled 9th out of 50 worldwide top arenas for first-quarter ticket sales, making it the second highest ticket selling venue in Australia, second to Sydney's Afterpay Arena, which placed third. In 2012, the arena became Australia's highest selling venue and 4th in the world, based on 2011 ticket sales.

Rod Laver Arena's record attendance of 16,183 was set on 18 November 2007 for a Justin Timberlake concert during his FutureSex/LoveShow tour.

American living legend Beyoncé performed there numerous times between 2002 and 2013, either as a member of Destiny's Child or as a solo artist. In 2013, during her The Mrs Carter Show World Tour, she played 4 sold-out shows, selling over 47,000 tickets and generating nearly 8 million dollars.

American singer Chris Brown performed on April 23, 2011 as part of his F.A.M.E. Tour (Chris Brown)

American singer P!nk performed a record-breaking 18 concerts at the venue in the winter of 2013 with her Truth About Love Tour, beating her own record of 17 shows from the Funhouse Tour in 2009. She is currently the artist who holds the record for most shows at the venue, with 53 shows.

American singer Billie Eilish performed four shows on her Happier Than Ever, The World Tour at the Rod Laver Arena. Eilish performed at the Rod Laver Arena from 22 September 2022 to 24 September 2022, and again on 26 September 2022. Eilish returned to Rod Laver Arena in 2025 on her Hit Me Hard And Soft: The Tour, on March 4, 5, 7 and 8 as part of the final Australian shows of said tour.

Chinese singer-songwriter Joker Xue performed on March 26, 2024 as part of his Extraterrestrial World Tour.

American singer Olivia Rodrigo made her Australian debut at this venue on her Guts Tour, performing shows on October 9, 10, 13 and 14, 2024.

British singer Dua Lipa performed five shows from March 17 through March 23 2025, for her Radical Optimism Tour.

Japanese Singer Ado performed for the second time in Australia, after her first performance in Sydney two days prior for her Hibana World Tour on the 27th of May 2025.

American rock band Linkin Park played two shows on March 8th and 10th in 2026 as part of their From Zero World Tour. They previously playing in the venue on the 14th and 15th of October 2007, on the 12th and 13th of December 2010 and most recently on February 27, 2013. A Live recording of the song In The End from one of the 2010 shows was included on Hybrid Theory: Around the World released in 2012, while live recordings from one of the 2010 shows of the songs Bleed It Out and Shadow of the Day were included on Minutes to Midnight: Live Around the World also released in 2012.

British singer Olivia Dean performed a pair of shows on 5 and 6 October 2026, on her Art of Loving Live tour.

Canadian band Nickelback will perform one show at the venue, in October 2027, as part of their Everything Under the Sun Tour. It will be the band's first tour of Australia since February 2019.

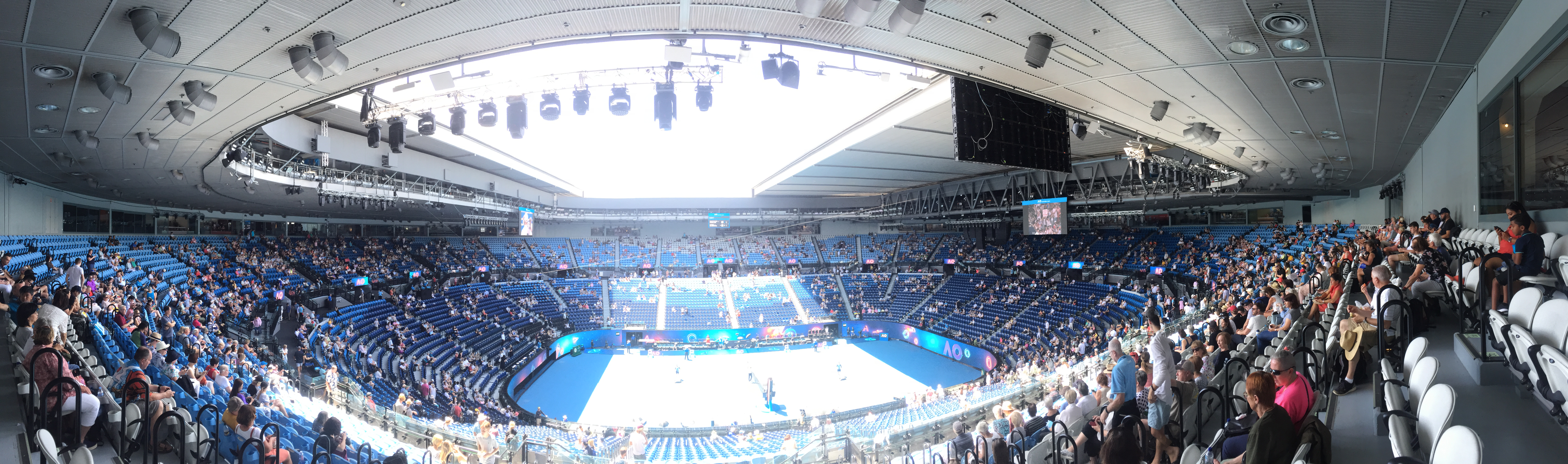
A panoramic view of Rod Laver Arena during a day session at the 2020 Australian Open

== Tennis surface ==
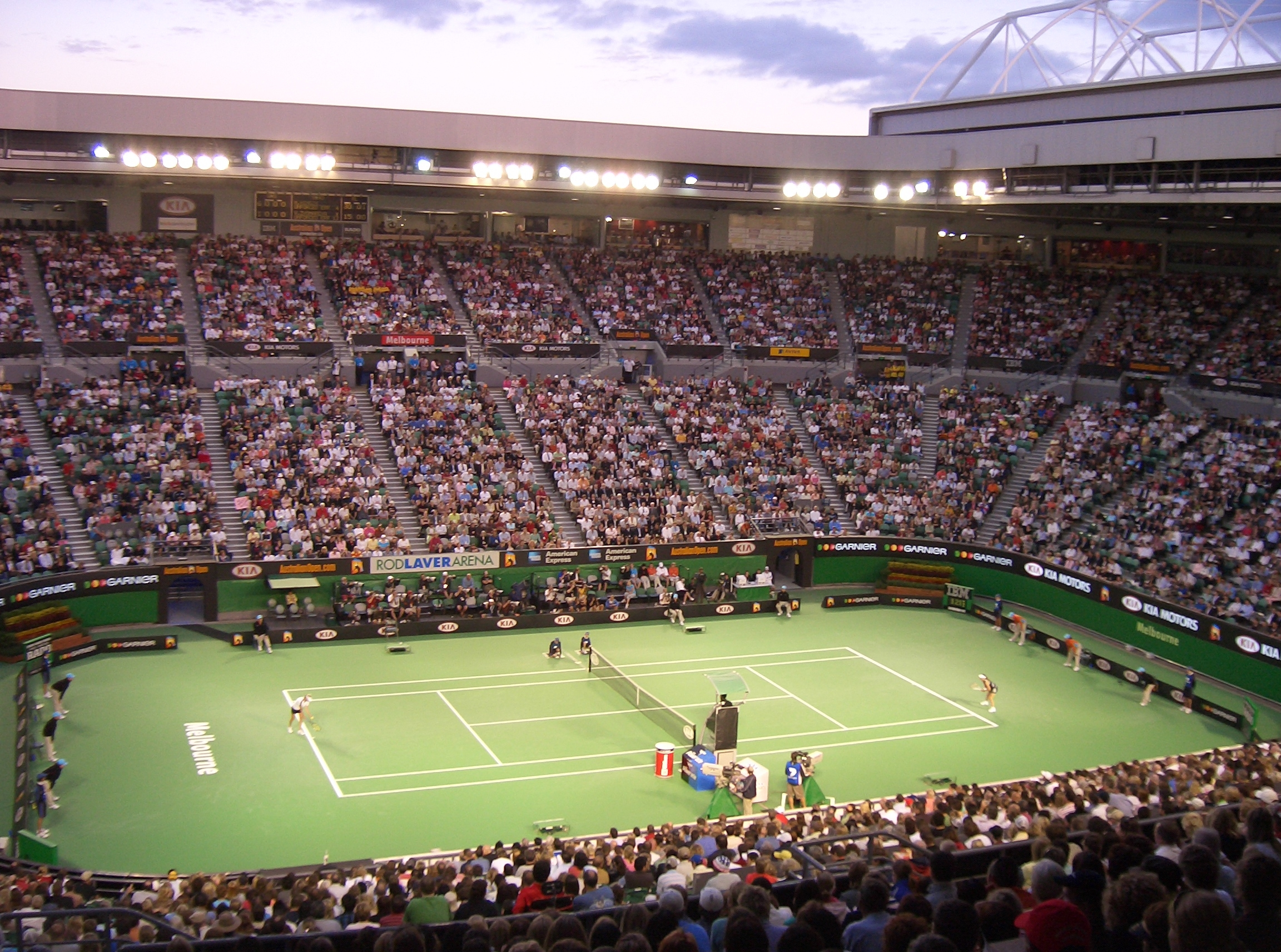
Interior of Rod Laver Arena with the original Rebound Ace surface

From 1988 until 2007, the surface of the court at the Australian Open and on Rod Laver Arena was Rebound Ace, which was coloured green and played slowly. The surface was also blamed for many injuries in the Australian Open, with many players claiming that the surface became sticky in hot weather, making it difficult to play on.

In 2008, the surface was changed to Plexicushion, and coloured blue. The surface is similar in properties to DecoTurf, the surface used at that time for the US Open. This has more cushioning and more give than Rebound Ace. In 2019 the surface was changed again to Greenset, though retained its blue appearance and similarities to the Plexicushion.

It has also had a temporary grass court in use, during the 1993 Davis Cup quarterfinals, 2001 Davis Cup final and the 2003 Davis Cup final.

== Refurbishment ==
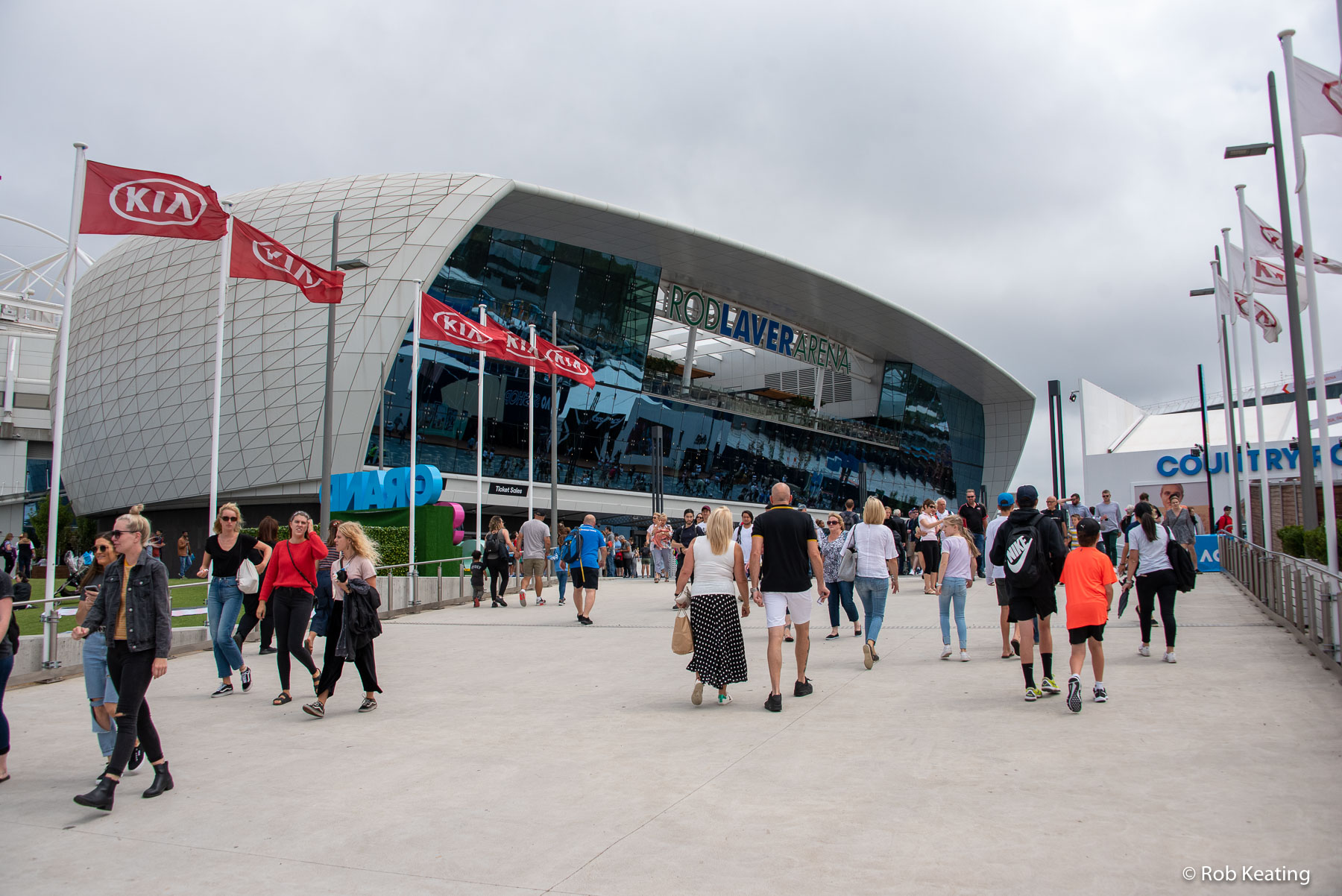
A view of the redeveloped Rod Laver Arena in January 2020.

In June 2015, it was announced that the arena would undergo a redevelopment of its exterior facade and interior customer features, such as bars and other facilities. The refurbishment constituted the main aspect of the $338 million second stage of redevelopments that occurred at the Melbourne Park precinct, which included a new pedestrian bridge linking Melbourne Park and Birrarung Marr and a new media and administration centre. Construction began in April 2016.

The refurbishment included a new eastern-facing primary entrance, an expanded public concourse space and other amenities designed to "open up" the arena and provide enhanced facilities and entry points for spectators. A new four-level Player Pod was constructed which increased the space for training, treatment, recovery, dining and lounging for athletes at major tournaments such as the Australian Open. In addition, the venue's roof was upgraded to allow for it to be closed for inclement weather in five minutes, dropping from the 30 minutes it took beforehand. The refurbishment was completed in late December 2018.

== Naming ==
- National Tennis Centre at Flinders Park (11 January 1988 – 28 January 1996)
- Centre Court (29 January 1996 – 15 January 2000)
- Rod Laver Arena (16 January 2000 – present)

== Record attendances ==
=== Concert ===
- 16,183 – Justin Timberlake, 18 November 2007

=== Basketball ===
- National Basketball League
  - 15,366 – South East Melbourne Magic vs Melbourne Tigers, 22 June 1996
- International
  - 15,062 – Australia vs New Zealand, 15 August 2015

=== Tennis ===
- 14,820 – Australian Open / Davis Cup (various)

=== Esports ===
- ~26000 - Intel Extreme Masters Melbourne 2025 (Counter-Strike 2)

== See also ==
- List of sports venues named after individuals
- List of tennis stadiums by capacity
- List of indoor arenas in Australia
