= SportMaster Sport Surfaces =

Tennis hardcourt surface made from multiple layers of acrylic, silica sand, and such

SportMaster Sport Surfaces is a tennis hardcourt surface made from multiple layers of acrylic, silica sand, and other constituents. The system is applied on an asphalt or concrete substrate, and can be used indoor or outdoors in any climate. SportMaster Sport Surfaces are manufactured by ThorWorks Industries, Inc.

== ITF Pace Classifications ==
SportMaster tennis court surfaces are classified by the International Tennis Federation pace classification programme, and have obtained all five paces: Slow, Medium-slow, Medium, Medium-fast, and Fast.

== Tournaments ==
SportMaster is the official surface of the United States Professional Tennis Association and the playing surface of the Irving Tennis Classic, as of 2012. The DTC is an ATP Challenger Tour tournament located in Las Colinas, Texas. Other tournaments where SportMaster is the official playing surface include:

- Washington Open (tennis) Currently, this is one of only two ATP World Tour 500 series tournament in the United States.
- Connecticut Open (tennis) Part of the WTA Premier tournaments and located at Yale University.
- 2016 Tennis Championships of Maui. Also part of the ATP Challenger Tour series.

== Other sport surfaces ==
Other sport surface variations in the SportMaster lines include basketball, roller hockey, running track, and multipurpose systems.

== See also ==
Other major bands of hardcourt surfaces:

- DecoTurf
- GreenSet
- Laykold
- Plexicushion
- Rebound Ace
