= Laykold =

Tennis court surfacing

Logo

Laykold is a brand of tennis hardcourt constructed over an asphalt or concrete base. It can be constructed without cushion or with a cushion layer (Laykold Cushion Plus) for better force reduction and longer player longevity. Court surfaces are made of various materials including rubber, silica, and acrylic resin. Laykold is manufactured by Advanced Polymer Technology based in Harmony, Pennsylvania.

== Tournaments ==
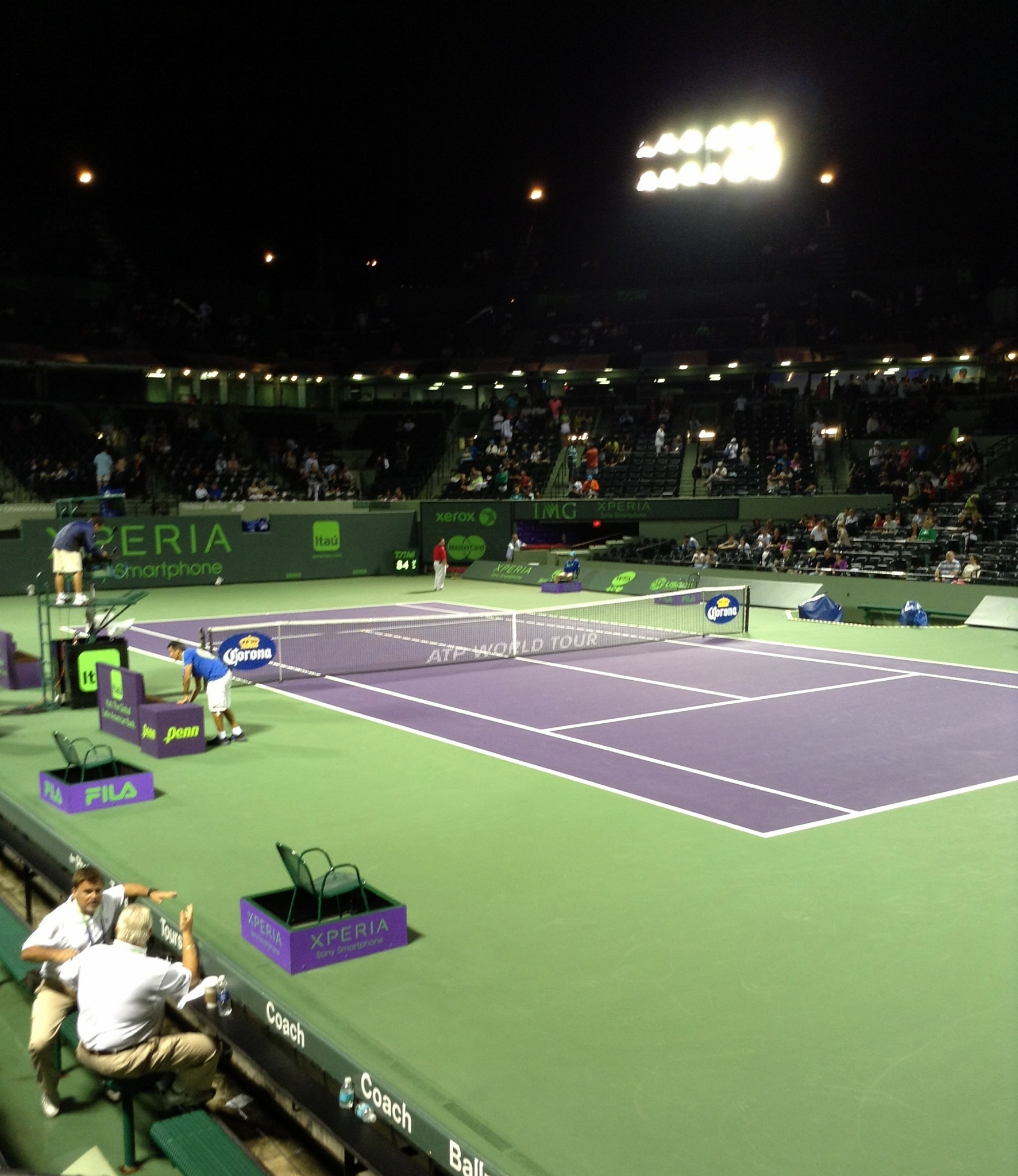
Laykold court at the Miami Open in March 2013

Laykold has been the surface of the Miami Open since 1984. In March 2020, the United States Tennis Association (USTA) announced that the US Open will be using Laykold for five years, starting with the 2020 tournament. In 2025 the surface was used at Indian Wells.

== See also ==
Other major bands of hardcourt surfaces:

- DecoTurf
- GreenSet
- Plexicushion
- Rebound Ace
- SportMaster Sport Surfaces
