= Rebound Ace =

Type of tennis court surface

Logo

Rebound Ace is a cushioned tennis hardcourt composed of polyurethane rubber, fiberglass, and other materials on top of an asphalt or reinforced concrete base. It is manufactured and sold by California Products Corporation's Sports Surfaces division, a company based in Andover, Massachusetts, United States.

== Properties ==
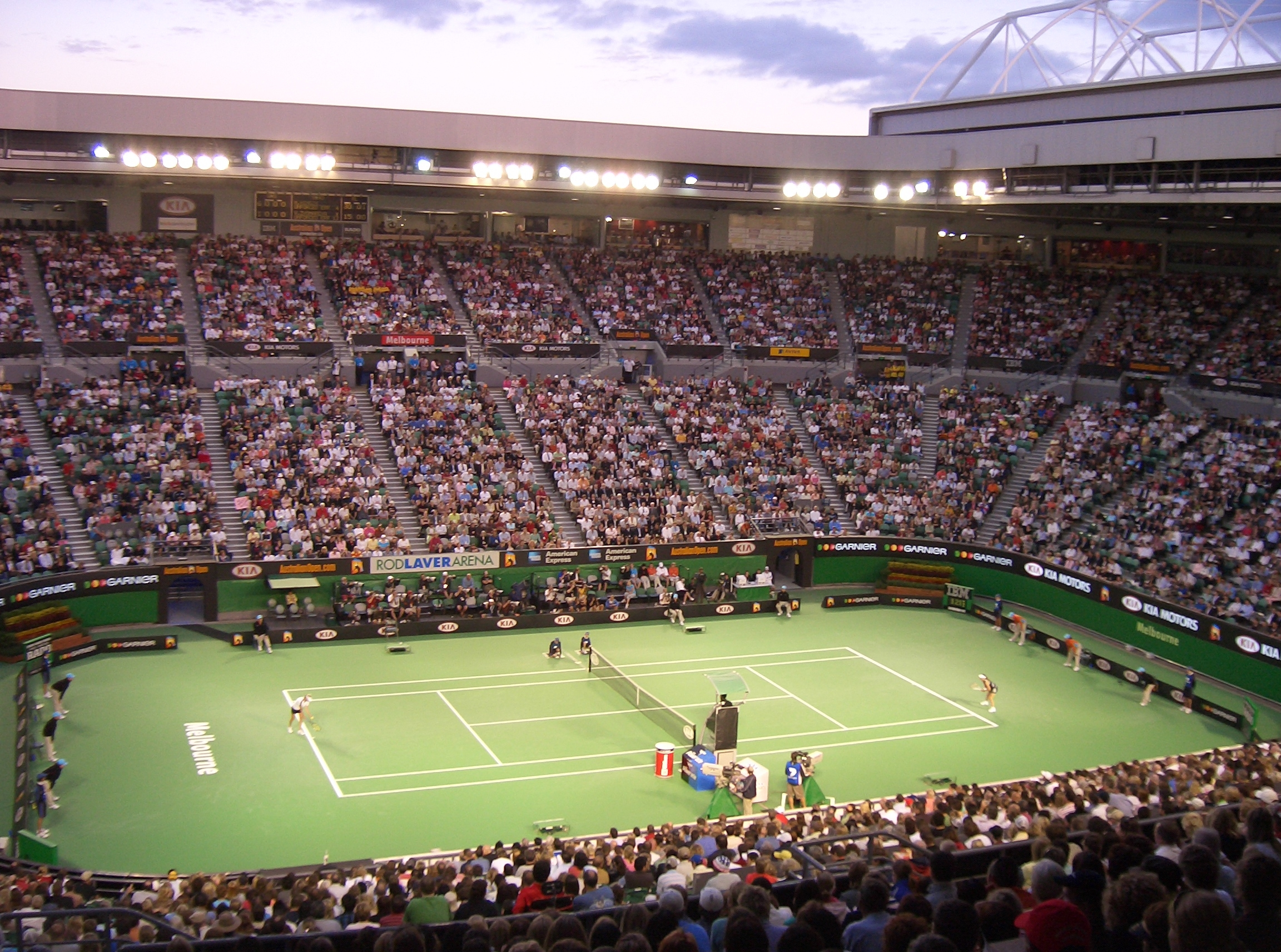
The Rod Laver Arena, the centre court of the Australian Open, in 2006

The friction of the surface of Rebound Ace can be varied by adjusting the amount of sand in the top layer, thereby customising the ball bounce and general speed of the court. Rebound Ace is sometimes compared with DecoTurf, which is used at the US Open, but Rebound Ace is built with more cushioning.

== Australian Open ==
From 1988 until May 30 2007, Rebound Ace was the official surface of the Australian Open, when it was replaced by Plexicushion.

It was subject to some controversy in 2002 when some tennis players argued that it got very sticky with high temperatures, increasing the chances of injuries. However, evidence points to it being no worse than other hard courts. A 2002 quote by Paul McNamee indicates that investigations found nothing, commenting that "an investigation into injuries at the Australian Open, by the ATP and WTA tours, had laid no blame on Rebound Ace.

Rebound Ace was also used at the Sydney 2000 Olympics, at Homebush Bay in the Sydney Olympic Park.

In 2013, Rebound Ace was acquired by California Products Corporation of Andover, Massachusetts, which also produces DecoTurf (used at the US Open) and Plexicushion (which replaced Rebound Ace at the Australian Open), and incorporated into its Sports Surfaces line of athletic surfacing products.

== See also ==
Other major bands of hardcourt surfaces:

- DecoTurf
- GreenSet
- Laykold
- Plexicushion
- SportMaster Sport Surfaces
