= Plexicushion =

Tennis court surfacing

Logo

Plexicushion is a brand of acrylic-based hardcourt tennis surface and one of the surface types used on the professional Association of Tennis Professionals and Women's Tennis Association tours. It is manufactured and sold by the sports surfaces division of California Products Corporation, a company based in Andover, Massachusetts, United States.

== Australian Open ==
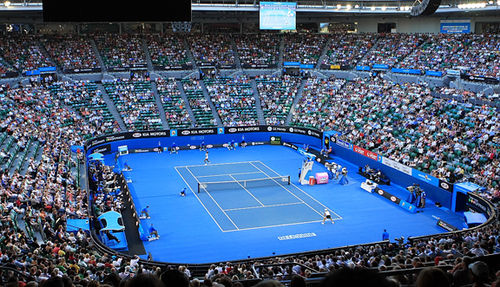
Rod Laver Arena, the center court of the Australian Open, with a Plexicushion surface

On May 30, 2007, the Australian Open and Tennis Australia announced Plexicushion as the new Australian Open surface, replacing the Rebound Ace surface that had been in use since Melbourne Park was opened in 1988. The surface was installed in time for the 2008 Australian Open, and was accompanied by a change in surfaces at the lead-up tournaments to the Australian Open. The brand was used at the Australian Open from 2008 to 2019, before being replaced by GreenSet for the 2020 event.

== Indian Wells ==
A similar hardcourt surface, called "Plexipave", was in use at the Indian Wells Masters tournament.

== See also ==
Other major bands of hardcourt surfaces:

- DecoTurf
- GreenSet
- Laykold
- Rebound Ace
- SportMaster Sport Surfaces
