= DecoTurf =

Tennis court surfacing

Logo

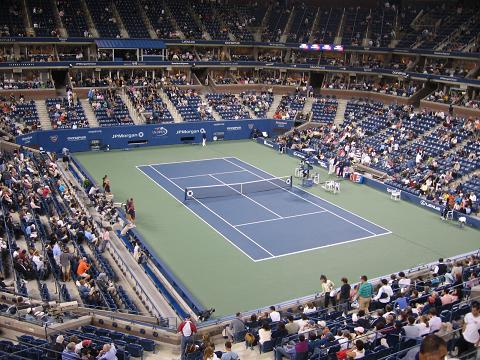
Arthur Ashe Stadium, US Open in Decoturf.

DecoTurf is a brand of tennis hardcourt constructed from layers of acrylic resin, rubber, silica, and other materials on top of an asphalt or concrete base. It is manufactured by the sports surfaces division of California Products Corporation, based in Andover, Massachusetts.

The surface is currently in use at the following tournaments:

- Washington Open
- Dubai Championships
- Canada Masters
- China Open
- Japan Open
- Shanghai Masters

DecoTurf was used at the US Open from 1978 to 2019, at the 2020 Olympics held in Tokyo, Japan; the 2008 Olympics held in Beijing, China, and the 2004 Olympics held in Athens, Greece, as well as the Paralympic Games at both sites.

== See also ==
Other major bands of hardcourt surfaces:

- GreenSet
- Laykold
- Plexicushion
- Rebound Ace
- SportMaster Sport Surfaces
