= GreenSet =

Tennis court surfacing

Logo

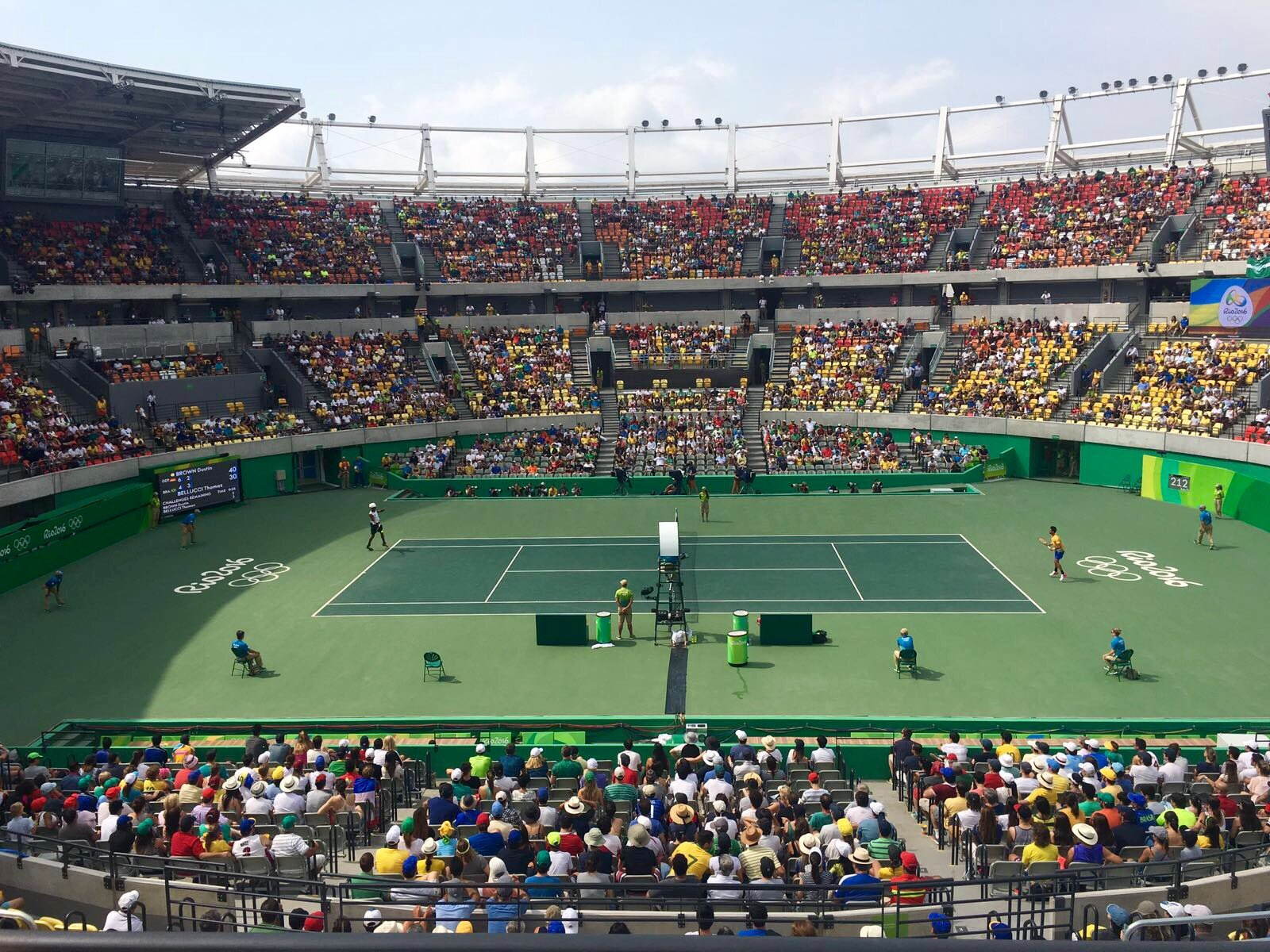
Tennis court at the 2016 Olympic Games

GreenSet is a supplier of acrylic hardcourt surfaces used in many professional tennis events run by the International Tennis Federation (ITF) and on the Association of Tennis Professionals (ATP) and Women's Tennis Association (WTA) tours. It is made of layers of acrylic resin and silica on top of an asphalt or concrete base, for permanent facilities, or on top of a wooden platform, for venues with occasional use. The company is based in Barcelona, Spain.

== Overview ==
GreenSet surfaces are homologated by the ITF Court Pace Rating categories, classified in the Medium-Slow, Medium and Medium-Fast.

GreenSet has been in use since 1970, when it was first introduced in Europe. Since then, over 60,000 tennis courts around the world have been coated with GreenSet.

The surface is currently in use at the following tournaments:

- Australian Open and AO Series (since the 2020 tournament)
- Cincinnati Masters
- Paris Masters
- Swiss Indoors
- Open Sud de France
- ATP Finals at the O2 Arena in London.
- WTA Prague Open (since the 2021 tournament)

Many Davis Cup and Billie Jean King Cup ties are also held on GreenSet courts.

Tennis at the 2016 Summer Olympics in Rio, as well as the 2016 Summer Paralympics, was played on GreenSet Grand Prix Cushion courts. The Olympic Tennis Centre, with over 18,000 square metres, was completely surfaced in early 2016, months ahead of the event. GreenSet also supplied the BMX surfaces for the Olympic BMX Centre in Rio.

== See also ==
Other major bands of hardcourt surfaces:

- DecoTurf
- Laykold
- Plexicushion
- Rebound Ace
- SportMaster Sport Surfaces
