= Tennis Australia =

Governing body of tennis in Australia

- Sport: Tennis
- Abbreviation: TA
- Founded: 1904
- Affiliation: World Tennis
- Regional affiliation: Oceania Tennis Federation
- Headquarters: Melbourne, Victoria
- Chairman: Chris Harrop
- CEO: Andrew Abdo

Official website
- tennis.com.au
- (Australia)

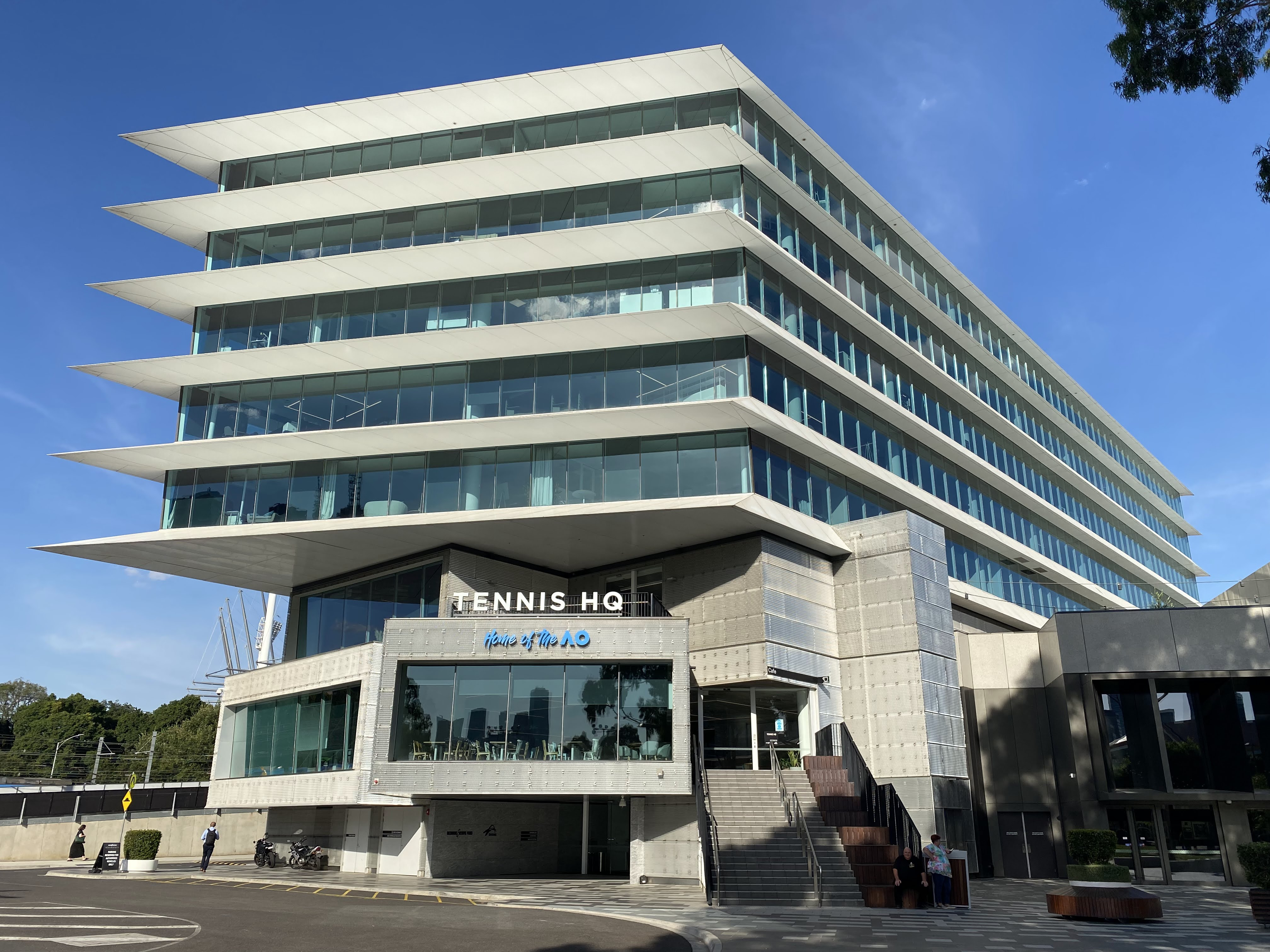
The headquarters in Melbourne

Tennis Australia is the governing body for tennis in Australia. It is owned by Australian states and territories. The association organizes national and international tennis tournaments including the Australian Open, Australian Open Series, Davis Cup, Billie Jean King Cup, ATP Cup, and Australian Pro Tour. In addition, the association takes the responsibility to facilitate tennis at all levels from grassroots to elite development. Tennis Australia's state-based member associates carry out the promotion, management, and development of tennis within Australia. Other than that, it administers amateur tournaments and youth development programs.

Tennis Australia's headquarters is located in Melbourne, Australia. It administers tennis projects throughout Australia, employing around 716 full-time staff. The association generates income from selling tournament tickets, TV rights, and through sponsorship from companies.

The organisation was formulated and incorporated in 1904. In 1904, it operated as the Lawn Tennis Association of Australasia. However, the name was changed to the Lawn Tennis Association of Australia in 1906. Finally, in 1986, the name was changed to Tennis Australia (TA).

== History ==
The exact origin of tennis in Australia is not known. Many believe the ancient civilisations of Greece and Rome initiated racket and ball games like the current tennis. Others argue that France and England introduced tennis around the 18th and 19th centuries. In 1875, a meeting was held in England that determined a standardised set of rules for the sport of lawn tennis. In January 1880, Australia hosted its first tennis tournament at the Melbourne Cricket Club. In the following 20 years, the popularity of tennis grew among wealthy Australians. In 1904, Australia required a governing body for tennis in Australia. The state representatives formed the Australasian Lawn Tennis Association for both Australia and New Zealand.

The purpose of the Lawn Tennis Association of Australasia in 1904, was to organise the Davis Cup and the Australasian Championships. In 1926, the association moved to Melbourne from Sydney and began to trade as the Lawn Tennis Association of Australia. It was managed by Sir Norman Brookes until 1955. As tennis grew in popularity around the world during the 1970s and 1980s, the association formed a company and remanded Tennis Australia in 1986.

=== 2020s ===
In February 2026, Craig Tiley resigned as CEO to take up a position as CEO of the United States Tennis Association, he will remain as CEO of Tennis Australia until his successor is appointed.

In May 2026, CEO of the National Rugby League (NRL) Andrew Abdo was announced as the next CEO of Tennis Australia, he will take up the role in August.

== Major tournaments ==
=== Australian Open ===
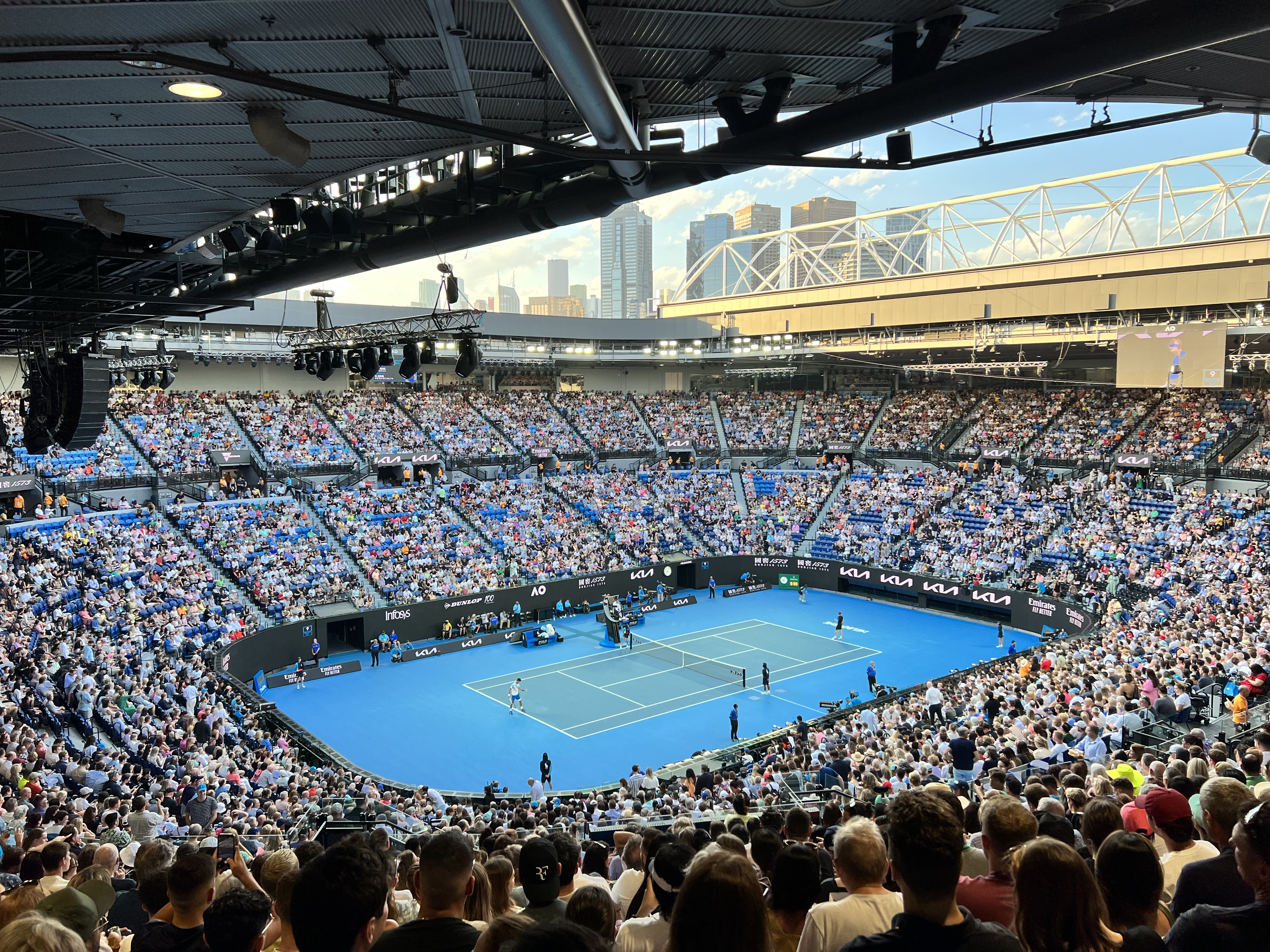
Australian Open 2023

The Australian Open, formerly known as the Happy Slam, is one of the major tennis tournaments hosted by Tennis Australia. Along with the US Open, French Open, and Wimbledon, the Australian Open is classified as a Grand Slam. The Australian Open is held annually in Melbourne for about two weeks. The categories of the tournament include women's and men's singles; men's mixed doubles; Junior Championships; the exhibition and legends; and wheelchair events. In 2019, the Australian Open experienced record attendance of more than 780,000 fans. The Australian Open's attendance rate has increased by 13% from 2015. This is the highest increase among the four slams. This way the Australian Open Tournaments contribute to the hosting state's economy. The 2020 tournaments, for example, created 1775 jobs and generated AU$ 387.7 million worth of Real Gross State Product. The 2020 tournaments also distributed AU$ 71 million worth of prize money. The winners of the Australian Open are awarded with prize money of AU$ 4.1 million as well as trophies with their name inscribed on it.

The first Australian Open was held in 1905 with only seventeen participants. By 1924, the Australian Open was a national event and it was hosted by different states every year. Since 1972, the Australian Open has only been held in Melbourne, Victoria. Women's tennis tournaments were only included in the Australian Open from 1922. In 1969, the Australian Open allowed all players and professionals to compete in the tournament.

=== The Australian Open series ===
The Australian Open Series tournaments are pro tournaments held prior to the start of the Australian Open tournament. The Series’ tournaments include:

- Brisbane International
- The Brisbane International is part of the Association of Tennis Professionals (ATP) World Tour 250 series and the Women's Tennis Association (WTA) Premier tournaments. This international tournament is owned by Tennis Australia and is annually held in Queensland Tennis Center prior to the Australian Open.
- Sydney International
- Sydney International, part of the ATP tour, is a tennis tournament played leading up to the Australian Open. Historically, colonial officials used the Sydney International tournaments to select players for the Davis Cup team. The Sydney International includes tournaments for both men and women.
- Hobart International
- The Hobart International is part of the WTA tour that is annually held at the Domain Tennis Center. The tournament is for international female tennis players.
- Hopman Cup
- The Hopman Cup was co-founded in 1989 by Paul McNamee, an Australian doubles champion. The Hopman is named in honor of Harry Hopman, one of Australia's outstanding tennis players. The Hopman Cup is an international mixed-gender team tennis event that is annually organized in Perth. The tournament is part of the International Tennis Federation (ITF) and features players from eight countries. The tournament has been played since 1989 and paused in 2020.
- World Tennis Challenge
- The World Tennis Challenge was launched in 2009. It replaced the Australian Men's Hardcourt Championship. The WTC is held in South Australia for over three nights. It aims to provide a platform for players to prepare for the Grand Slam, the Australian Open. The WTC attracts over 14,000 spectators each year. The WTC is organized by Tennis Australia and supported by the South Australian Tourism Commission.

=== The ATP Cup ===
The ATP Cup is a men's team competition that is annually hosted in Australia by Tennis Australia. Players from 24 countries participate. The tournaments are held in the NSW Tennis Centre at Sydney Olympic Park before the Australian Open. The total prize money of US$15 million is distributed to the winners. The players can also win up to 750 singles and 250 doubles ATP ranking points.

=== The Davis Cup ===
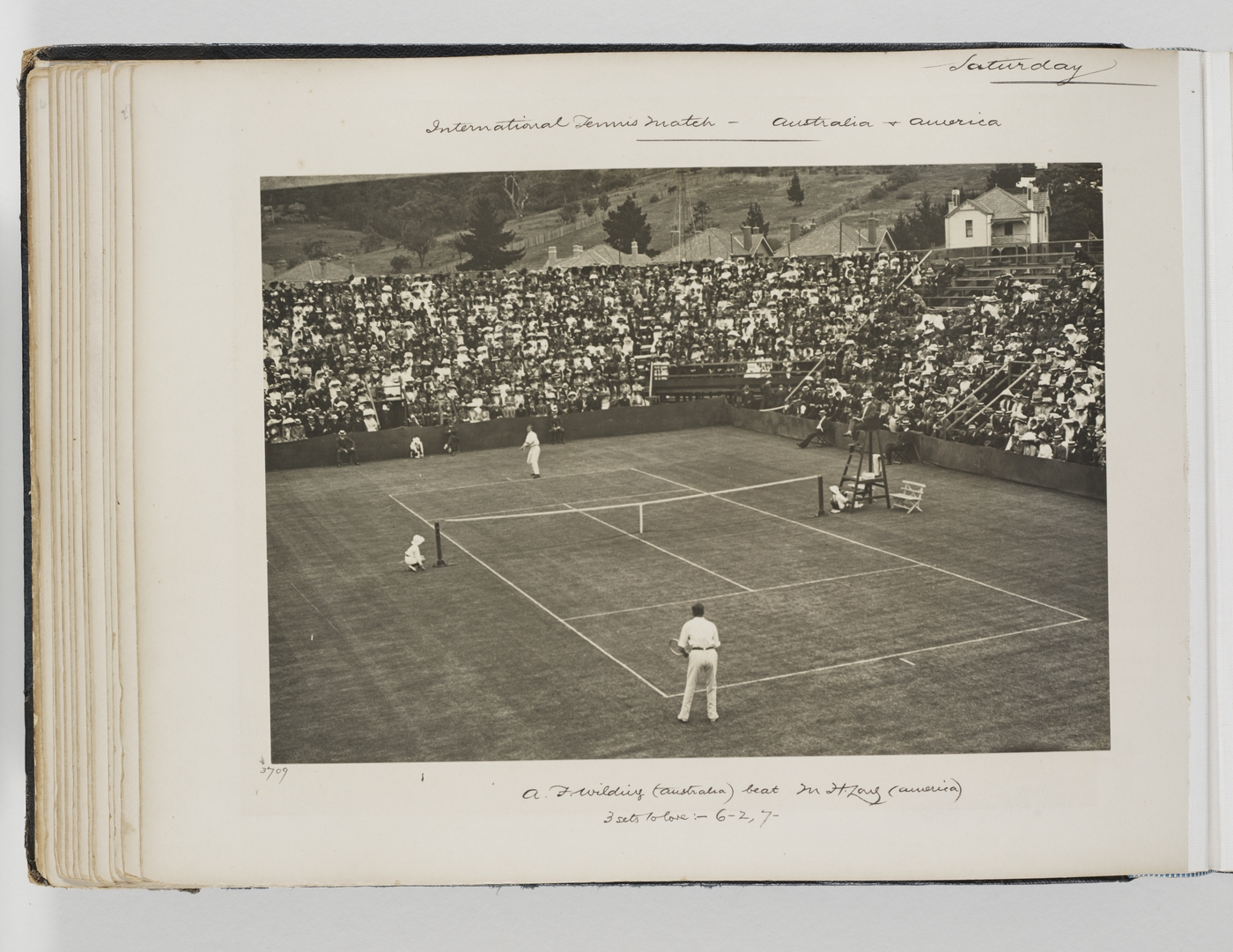
1909 Davis Cup held in Sydney

The Davis Cup is a Men's International Tennis Tournament organized annually by various countries. It is owned and regulated by the International Tennis Foundation and Kosmos Tennis Group. Tennis Australia frequently hosts the Davis Cup for Australia. It hosted 12 Davis Cup contests from 1946 to 2017. The 2017 Davis Cup held at the Kooyong Lawn Tennis Club was the most recent Davis Cup played in Australia.

=== Fed Cup / Billie Jean King Cup ===
Like the Davis Cup, the Fed Cup is the world's largest women's international team championship. 116 countries participate in the Fed Cup and the top 12 countries compete in the finals. The tournaments run for over one week. In 2020, it was renamed the Billie Jean King Cup after the 10-time winning champion Billie Jean King. The most recent Fed Cup hosted by Tennis Australia was in 2019 in Perth, WA. The event considerably contributed to the state's economy. It attracted more than 3000 people to Perth who spent AU$ 4.5 million. Also, as the tournament was broadcast internationally, it highlighted the state's attractions to international tourists. This would help boost WA's tourism markets in the future.

=== The Australian Pro Tour ===
The Australian Pro Tour includes Pro Tour events, Australian Money Tournaments, and the Asia-Pacific Tennis League that run for 36 weeks every year. The participants receive 15,105 world ranking points and the finalists share US$111,500 in prize money. The tournaments provide opportunities for emerging tennis players to practice professional tennis as well as connect with international tennis professionals. The tournaments allow players to choose a wide range of categories including surfaces, venues, and circuits. The tournament also offers international participants an opportunity to explore the iconic areas of Australia as the tournaments are played across the nation in regional and metropolitan areas.

== Famous Australian tennis players ==
Rod Laver

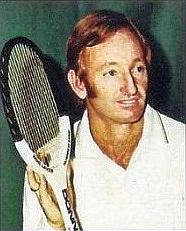
Rod Laver

Rodney George Laver, an Australian Tennis legend, and the only player in the history of tennis to hold the Grand Slam twice. Laver was born in the sunshine state of Australia and nicknamed ‘Rocket’ by his coach Harry Hopman who was a Davis Cup captain. At the age of 17, in 1956, Laver won the US Junior Championship tournament. In 1962, Laver became the only second player to win the Grand Slam and in 1969, he won the Grand Slam again. Rod Laver was ranked the world's number-one tennis player for seven successive years from 1964 to 1970. Throughout his career, Laver won thirty-nine titles and had a winning record of about eighty percent. Laver retired from professional tennis in 1979 and was part of the International and Australian Tennis Halls of Fame between 1981 and 1993. In 2000, as a tribute to Rod Laver, the 'Centre Court' or 'Flinders Park' in Melbourne Park was named after him; the Rod Laver Arena.

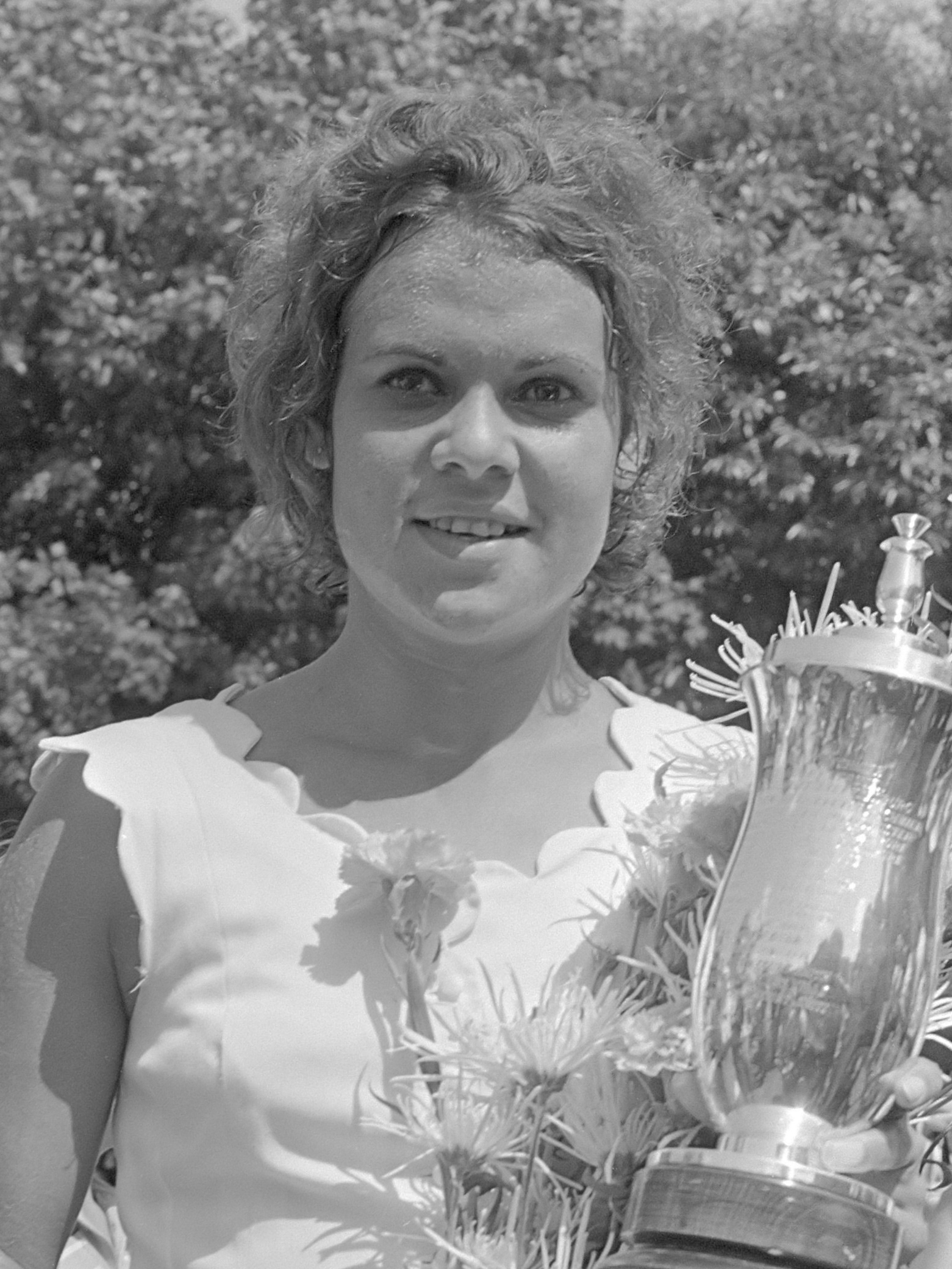
Evonne Goolagong Cawley

Evonne Goolagong Cawley

Evonne Goolagong Cawley, part of the Wiradjuri Aboriginal tribe, held the title of women's world number one tennis player from 1971 to 1976. At the age of 13, Goolagong-Cawley moved to live with tennis coach Vic Edwards. In 1971, 20-year-old Goolagong-Cawley competed in the Wimbledon final against Australian Tennis champion Margaret Court and won the Wimbledon title. In 1972, Evonne Goolagong Cawley was named Australian of the Year. Evonne continued to win every Australian state title and Australian singles title in 1974, 1975, and 1976 as well as more Wimbledon titles. Hence, an English Journalist nicknamed her the ‘Sunshine Supergirl’. In 1991, Evonne Goolagong Cawley moved to Noosa and restored her connections with her Wiradjuri people, and got involved with Aboriginal affairs. In 2018 she was appointed as a Companion of the Order of Australia.

== Support for players ==
Tennis Australia is involved with the local governments to support tennis at the grassroots. The local government owns 80 percent of tennis venues around Australia. Hence, TA recognises and supports the local government's involvement in organising tennis in the local community, parklands, and open spaces. Furthermore, TA and local governments around Australia have developed four rules to ensure all of the tennis facilities meet the shared objective of the sport's governing body. The four rules are accountability, community benefit, sustainability, and accessibility.

== Matches organised by Tennis Australia ==
Singles

The tennis singles tournaments involve individual players competing against each other. Tennis Australia hosts various Tennis singles tournaments.

Doubles

The tennis doubles tournaments include a pair of players on both sides of the net competing against each other. Both players move freely around their side of the court, between the double side-lines and baselines. Tennis Australia hosts men's doubles, women's doubles, and mixed doubles.

Inclusion and Diversity

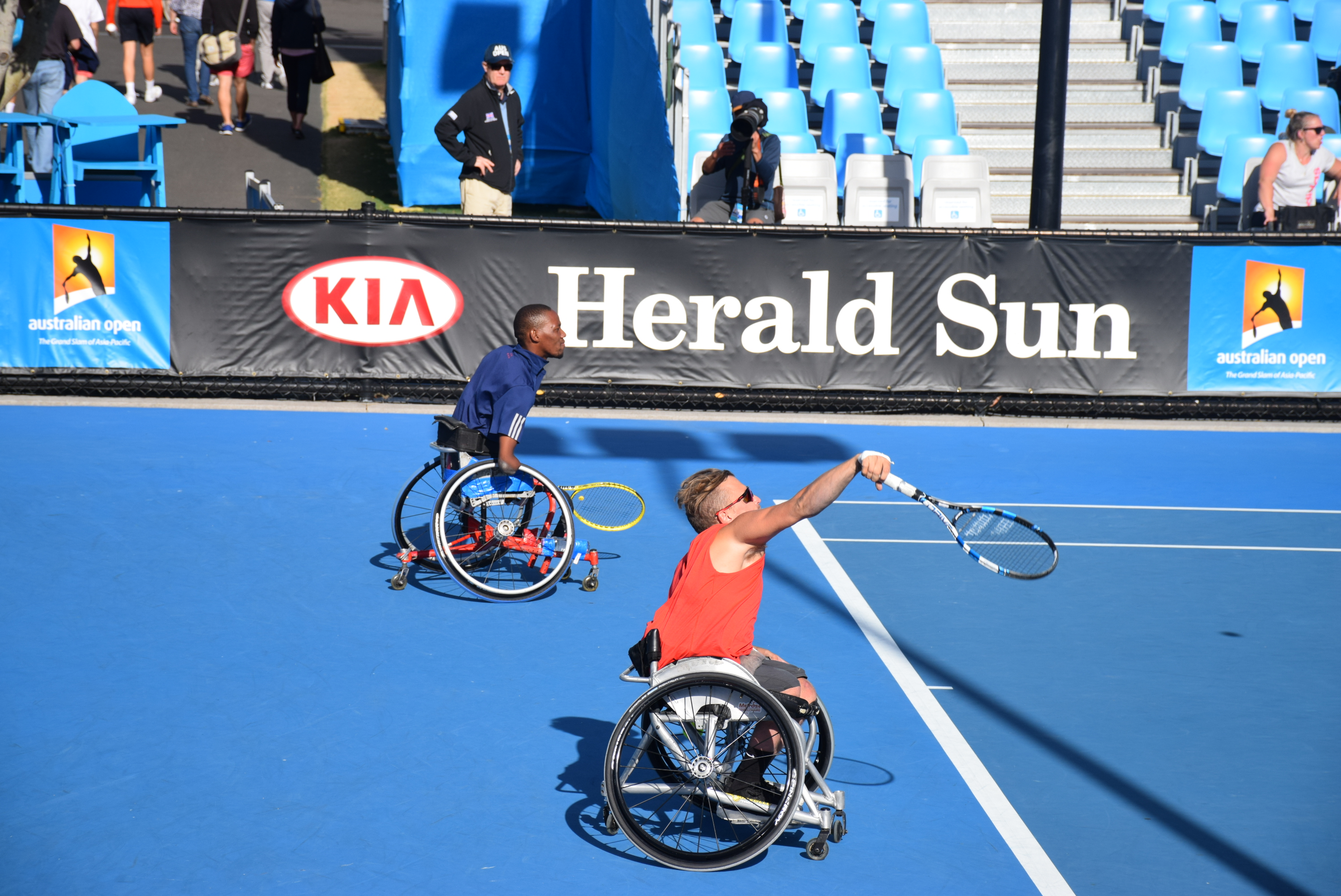
AO Wheelchair Tennis

Tennis Australia and its member associations are committed to embracing diversity. Tennis Australia provides an environment in which people of diverse backgrounds can participate and feel comfortable. Tennis Australia organises tournaments for people that have conditions such as deaf and hard of hearing, intellectual disability or autism, blindness and low vision, wheelchair tennis, and more.

Moreover, as Tennis Australia aims to create a discrimination-free environment, it has published a book called Tennis: Everybody Everywhere. The booklet outlines the scenarios of discriminator language and behaviours as well as provides practical solutions to deal with participants from diverse backgrounds.

Furthermore, Tennis Australia along with its Member Associations supports the participation of Aboriginal and Torres Strait Islanders through funding and promoting Indigenous Tennis Program (ITP). The ITP organises programs that offer tennis coaching to the Indigenous communities. The ITP employs a holistic approach to support Indigenous Australians to become officials, coaches, and administrators. This ultimately ensures the interested participants have a satisfactory and safe tennis experience. Moreover, Tennis Australia holds an annual National Indigenous Tennis Carnival at the Darwin International Tennis Centre in which participants of all potential ages 10–18 are able to get involved. The carnival aims to celebrate the culture, music, and food through Tennis.

== Awards ==
The awards issued by Tennis Australia include the Newcombe Medal, Spirit of Tennis, Coaching Excellence – Performance, Coaching Excellence – Club, Coaching Excellence – Development, Junior Athlete of the Year, Most Outstanding Athlete with Disability, Volunteer Achievement Award, Most Outstanding 30+ Tennis Senior, Excellence in Officiating, Most Outstanding Tennis Club, Most Outstanding Australian Ranking Tournament, Most Outstanding Professional Tournament and Most Outstanding School.

Tennis Australia has been following a new nomination process since 2016. The award winners across the nations are automatically nominated for their equivalent national award. The selection panel then determines the finalists for each Tennis Australia award category.

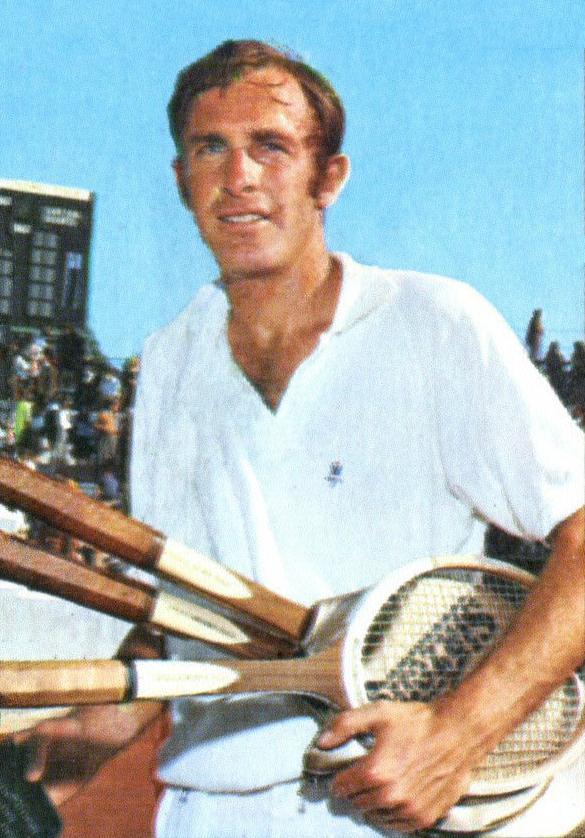
John Newcombe

=== The Newcombe Medal ===
The Newcombe Medal is one of the many awards issued by Tennis Australia annually. It is named in honour of Australian tennis player John Newcombe. The medal is awarded to Australia's most elite Tennis player and ambassador for tennis. The award seeks to acknowledge the performances, achievements, and contributions made by Tennis Australia's members. The nominees of the awards are selected by a panel appointed by Tennis Australia. The panel includes Australian Tennis champions and well-respected members of the Tennis community.

== See also ==
- Australian Open – Annual tennis tournament held in Melbourne
- Australia Davis Cup team – National tennis team
- Australia Fed Cup team – Australian women's tennis team
- Australia at the Hopman Cup – Sporting event delegation
- Tennis in Australia
