= Australian Open =

Annual tennis tournament held in Melbourne

- Official website
- Founded: 1905; 121 years ago
- Editions: 114 (2026)
- Location: Melbourne CBD; Australia
- Venue: Melbourne Park (since 1988)
- Surface: Hard – outdoors (Note: Rebound Ace was used from 1988 to 2007, Plexicushion from 2008 until 2019, and Blue GreenSet since 2020) (Note: Except for Rod Laver Arena, Margaret Court Arena, and John Cain Arena during rain delays.) (since 1988); Grass – outdoors (1905–1987)
- Prize money: A$111,500,000 (2026)

Men's
- Draw: 128S (128Q) / 64D (16Q) (Note: In the main draws, there are 128 singles players (S) and 64 doubles teams (D), and there are 128 and 16 entrants in the respective qualifying (Q) draws.)
- Current champions: Carlos Alcaraz (singles); Christian Harrison; Neal Skupski (doubles)
- Most singles titles: Novak Djokovic (10)
- Most doubles titles: Adrian Quist (10)

Women's
- Draw: 128S (128Q) / 64D (16Q)
- Current champions: Elena Rybakina (singles); Elise Mertens; Zhang Shuai (doubles)
- Most singles titles: Margaret Court (11)
- Most doubles titles: Thelma Coyne Long (12)

Mixed doubles
- Draw: 32
- Current champions: Olivia Gadecki; John Peers
- Most titles (male): 4 Harry Hopman
- Most titles (female): 4 Thelma Coyne Long

Grand Slam
- Australian Open; French Open; Wimbledon; US Open

Last completed
- 2026 Australian Open

The Australian Open is a tennis tournament organised by Tennis Australia annually at Melbourne Park in Melbourne, Victoria, Australia. It is the first of the four Grand Slam tennis tournaments every year, held before the French Open, Wimbledon and the US Open.

The Australian Open typically starts around the middle of January and continues for two weeks, concluding with the men's final traditionally held on the last Sunday of the month. It features men's and women's singles, men's, women's and mixed doubles, juniors’ championships, wheelchair, legends, and exhibition events.

Formerly played on grass courts, it switched to hard court in 1988. Three types of hardcourt surfaces have been used: green-coloured Rebound Ace (1988–2007), blue Plexicushion (2008–2019), and blue GreenSet since 2020.

First held in 1905 as the Australasian championships, the Australian Open has grown to become one of the biggest sporting events in the Southern Hemisphere. Nicknamed "the happy slam", the Australian Open is the highest attended Grand Slam event, with more than 1,360,000 people attending the 2026 tournament, including qualifying. It was also the first Grand Slam tournament to feature indoor play during wet weather or extreme heat with its three primary courts, Rod Laver Arena, John Cain Arena and the refurbished Margaret Court Arena equipped with retractable roofs.

The Australian Open has been held at the Melbourne Park complex since 1988 and is a major contributor to the Victorian economy; the 2026 Australian Open delivered A$722.3 million into the state's economy, while over the preceding decade, the Australian Open contributed more than A$3.9 billion in economic benefits to the state. Major occupations associated with the tournament include accommodation, hotels, cafés and trade services sectors.

== History ==
The Australian Open is managed by Tennis Australia, formerly the Lawn Tennis Association of Australia (LTAA), and was first played at the Warehouseman's Cricket Ground in Melbourne in November 1905. The facility, now known as the Albert Reserve Tennis Centre, was a grass court.

The tournament was first known as the Australasian Championships. It became the Australian Championships in 1927. Then, in 1969, it became the Australian Open. Since 1905, it has been staged 110 times in five Australian cities: Melbourne (66 times), Sydney (17 times), Adelaide (15 times), Brisbane (7 times), Perth (3 times), and two New Zealand cities: Christchurch (1906) and Hastings (1912).

Although it began in 1905, the International Lawn Tennis Federation (ILTF) did not designate it a major championship until 1924, following a meeting held in 1923. The tournament committee changed the tournament structure to include seeding at that time. In the period of 1916–1918, no tournament was organised due to World War I.

During World War II, the tournament was not held from 1941 to 1945. In 1972, it was decided to stage the tournament in Melbourne each year because it attracted the biggest patronage of any Australian city. The tournament was played at the Kooyong Lawn Tennis Club from 1972 until its move to the new Flinders Park complex in 1988.

The new facilities at Flinders Park were envisaged to meet the demands of a tournament that had outgrown Kooyong's capacity. The move to Flinders Park was an immediate success, with a 90 percent increase in attendance in 1988 (266,436) on the previous year at Kooyong (140,000).

Because of Australia's geographic remoteness, very few foreign players entered the tournament in the early 20th century. In the 1920s, the trip by ship from Europe to Australia took about 45 days. The first tennis players who came by aircraft were the US Davis Cup players in November 1946. Even inside Australia, many players could not travel easily. When the tournament was held in Perth, no one from Victoria or New South Wales crossed by train, a distance of about 3,000 kilometres (1,900 mi) between the east and west coasts. In Christchurch in 1906, of a small field of 10 players, only two Australians attended and the tournament was won by a New Zealander.

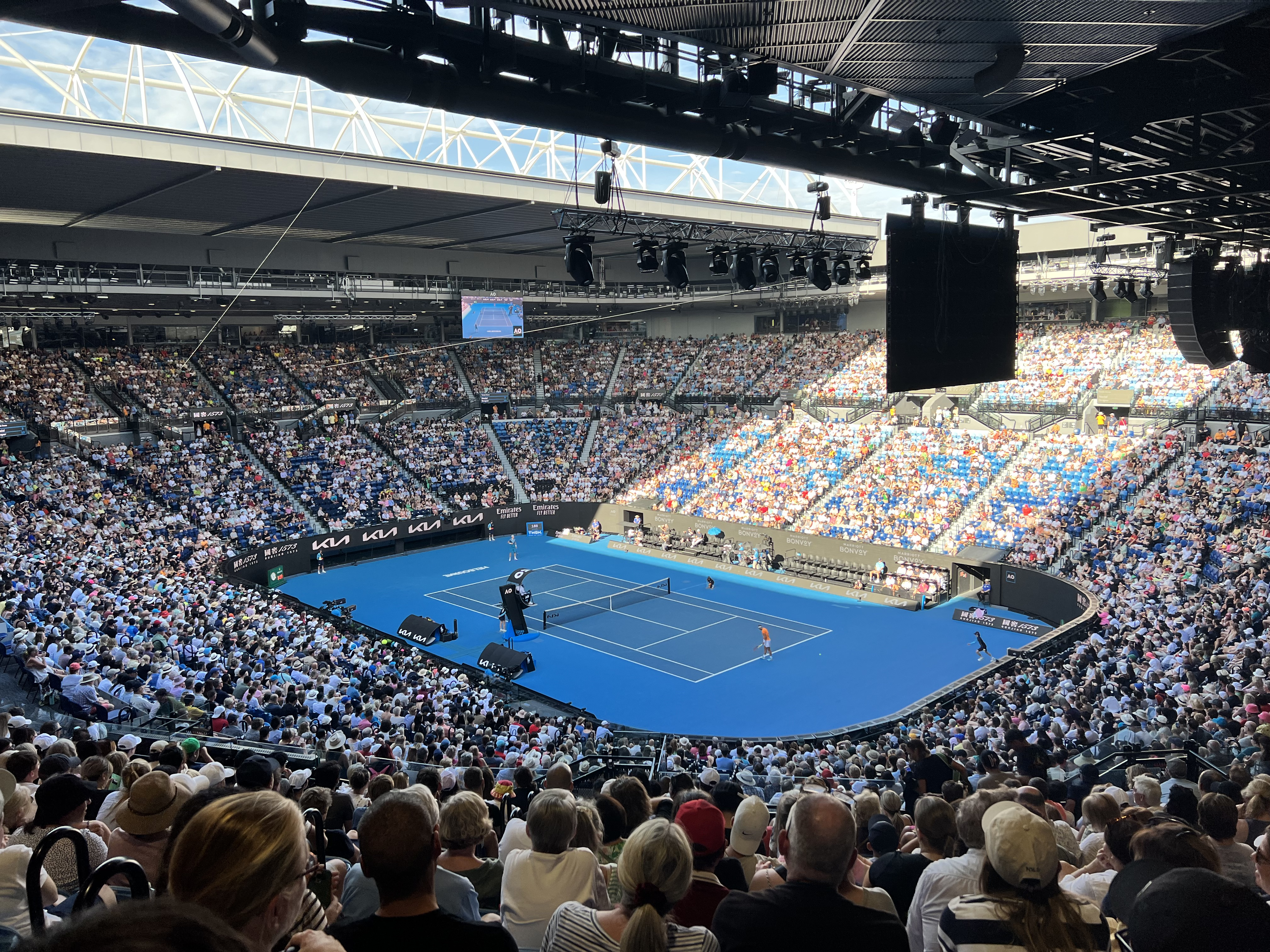
Rod Laver Arena, the main court of the Australian Open, in 2023

The first tournaments of the Australasian Championships suffered from the competition of the other Australasian tournaments. Before 1905, all Australian states, and New Zealand, had their own championships; the first being organised in 1880 in Melbourne and called the Championship of the Colony of Victoria (later the Championship of Victoria). In those years, the best two players – Australian Norman Brookes (whose name is now written on the men's singles cup) and New Zealander Anthony Wilding – almost did not play this tournament.

Brookes took part once and won in 1911, and Wilding entered and won the competition twice (1906 and 1909). Their meetings in the Victorian Championships (or at Wimbledon) helped to determine the best Australasian players. Even when the Australasian Championships were held in Hastings, New Zealand, in 1912, Wilding, though three times Wimbledon champion, did not come back to his home country. It was a recurring problem for all players of the era. Brookes went to Europe only three times, where he reached the Wimbledon Challenge Round once and then won Wimbledon twice.

Thus, many players had never played the Austral(as)ian amateur or open championships: the Doherty brothers, William Larned, Maurice McLoughlin, Beals Wright, Bill Johnston, Bill Tilden, René Lacoste, Henri Cochet, Bobby Riggs, Jack Kramer, Ted Schroeder, Pancho Gonzales, Budge Patty, and others, while Brookes, Ellsworth Vines, Jaroslav Drobný, came just once. Even in the 1960s and 1970s, when travel was less difficult, leading players such as Manuel Santana, Jan Kodeš, Manuel Orantes, Ilie Năstase (who only came once, when 35 years old) and Björn Borg came rarely or not at all.

=== Open era ===
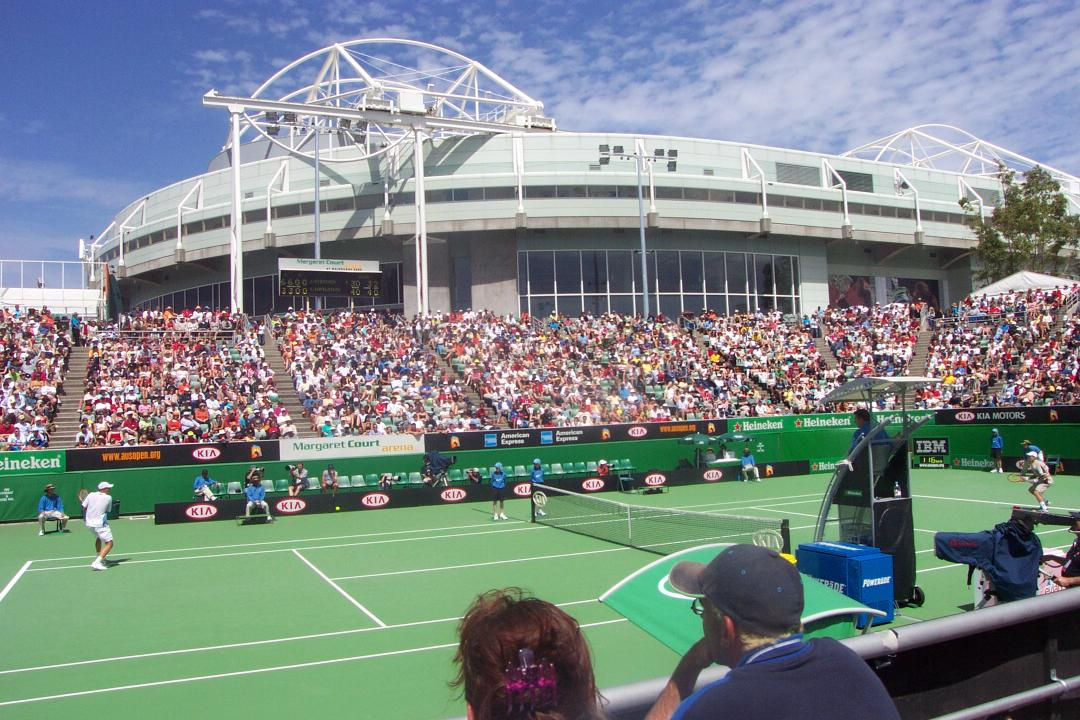
Margaret Court Arena at the Australian Open in 2005 prior to its redevelopment. Rod Laver Arena is in the background.

Beginning in 1969, when the first Australian Open was held on the Milton Courts at Brisbane, the tournament was open to all players, including professionals who were not allowed to play the traditional circuit. Nevertheless, except for the 1969 and 1971 tournaments, many of the best players missed the championship until 1982, because of the remoteness, the inconvenient dates (around Christmas and New Year's Day) and the low prize money. In 1970, George MacCall's National Tennis League, which employed Rod Laver, Ken Rosewall, Andrés Gimeno, Pancho Gonzales, Roy Emerson and Fred Stolle, prevented its players from entering the tournament because the guarantees were insufficient. The tournament was won by Arthur Ashe.

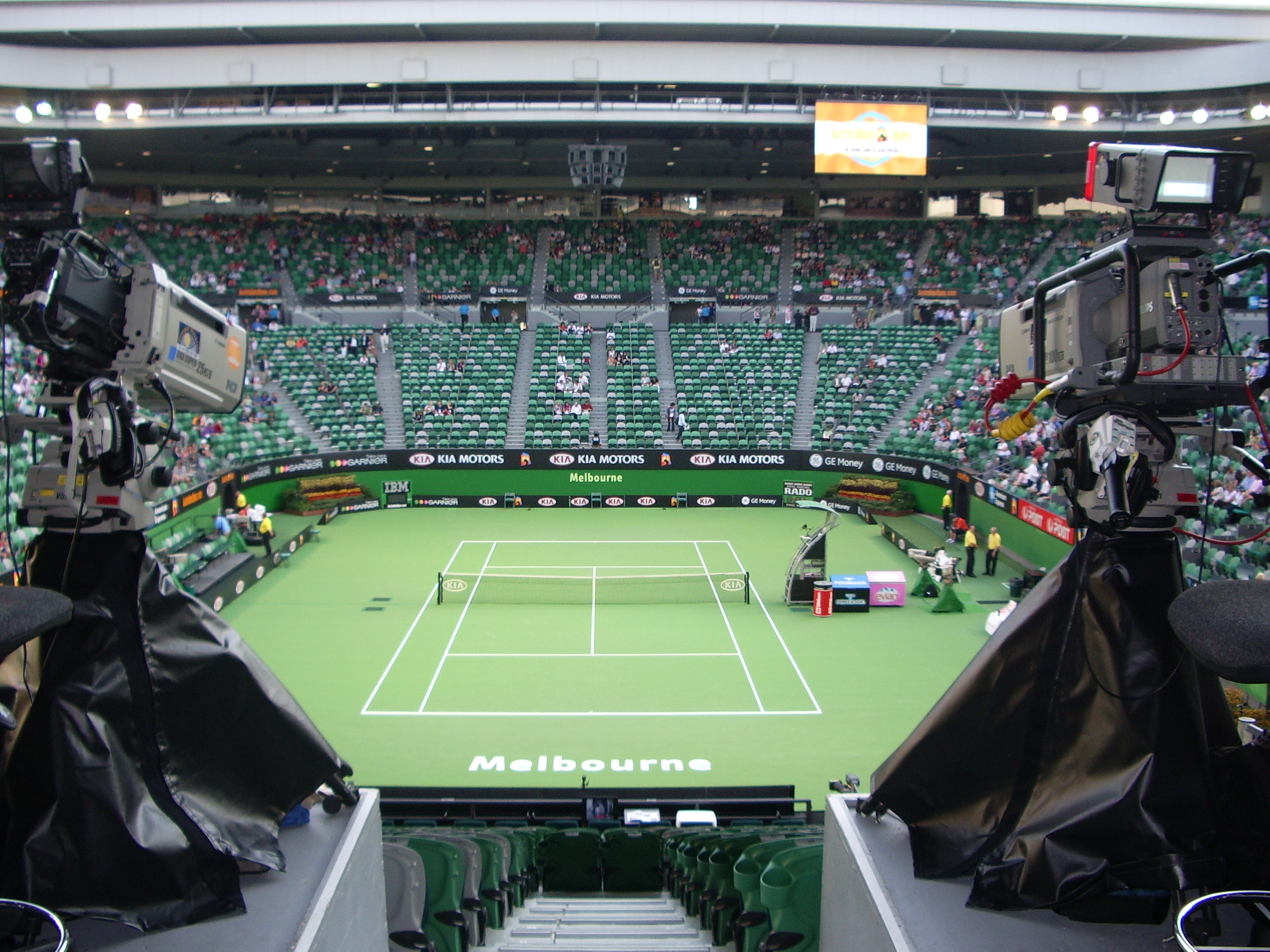
Rod Laver Arena night session in 2007, the last year the tournament used the Rebound Ace surface.

In 1983, Ivan Lendl, John McEnroe and Mats Wilander entered the tournament. Wilander won the singles title and both his Davis Cup singles rubbers in the Swedish loss to Australia at Kooyong shortly after. Following the 1983 Australian Open, the International Tennis Federation prompted the Lawn Tennis Association of Australia to change the site of the tournament, because the Kooyong stadium was then inappropriate to serve such a big event. In 1988 the tournament was first held at Flinders Park (later renamed Melbourne Park). The change of the venue also led to a change of the court surface from grass to a hard court surface known as Rebound Ace.

Mats Wilander was the only player to win the tournament on both grass and hard courts. In 2008, after being used for 20 years, the Rebound Ace was replaced by a cushioned, medium-paced, acrylic surface known as Plexicushion Prestige. Roger Federer and Serena Williams are the only players to win the Australian Open on both Rebound Ace and Plexicushion Prestige. The main benefits of the new surface are better consistency and less retention of heat because of a thinner top layer. This change was accompanied by changes in the surfaces of all lead-up tournaments to the Australian Open. The change was controversial because of the new surface's similarity to DecoTurf, the surface used by the US Open.

Before the Melbourne Park stadium era, tournament dates fluctuated as well, in particular in the early years because of the climate of each site or exceptional events. For example, the 1919 tournament was held in January 1920 (the 1920 tournament was played in March) and the 1923 tournament in Brisbane took place in August when the weather was not too hot and wet. After a first 1977 tournament was held in December 1976 – January 1977, the organisers chose to move the next tournament forward a few days, then a second 1977 tournament was played (ended on 31 December), but this failed to attract the best players.

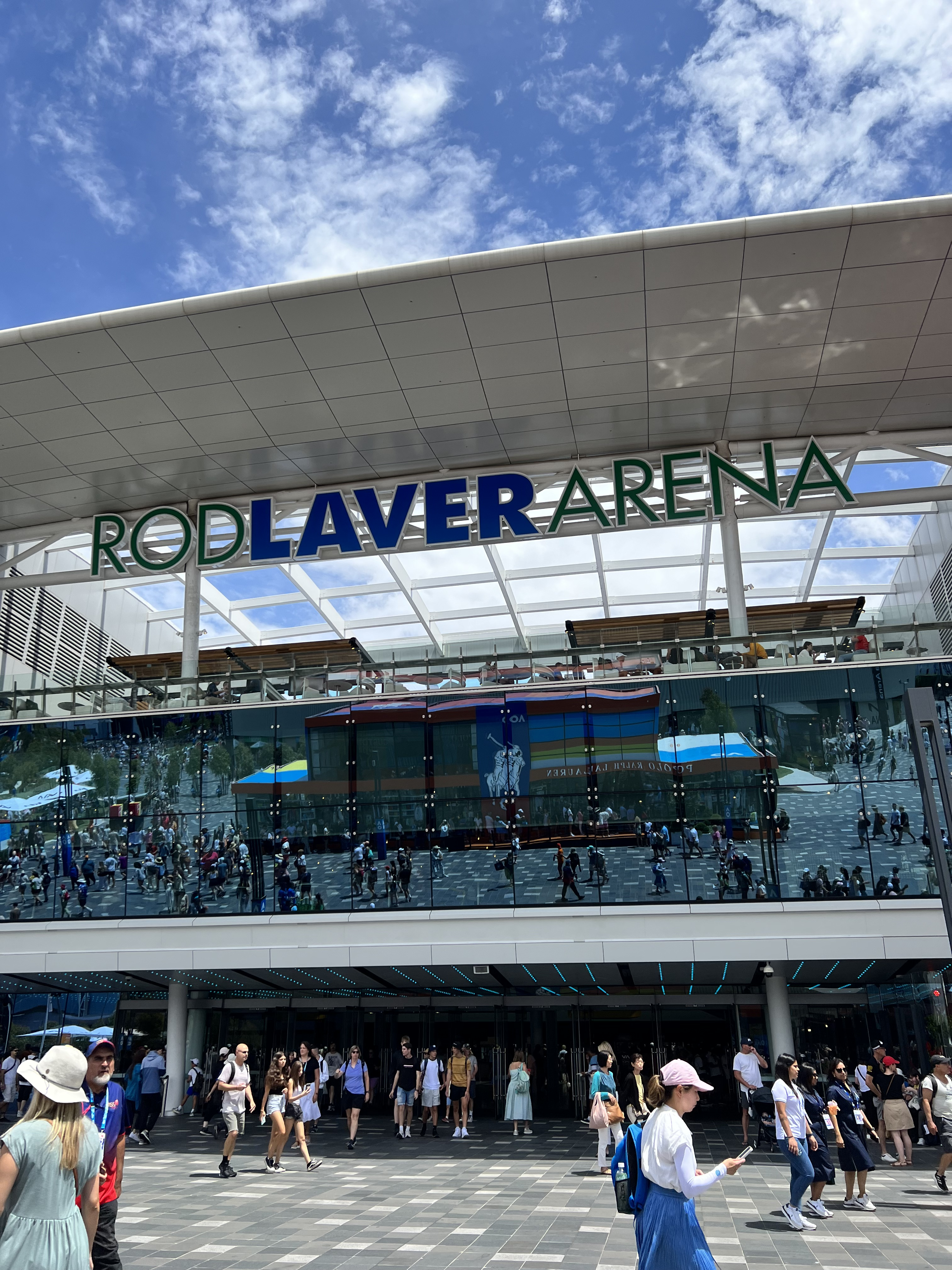
New Rod Laver Arena entrance added in 2018 as part of the Melbourne Park redevelopment.

From 1982 to 1985, the tournament was played in mid-December. Then it was decided to move the next tournament to mid-January (January 1987), which meant no tournament was organised in 1986. From 1987 to 2026, the Australian Open date has not changed (except for 2021, when it was postponed by three weeks to February due to the COVID-19 pandemic). In 2026, the tournament was played in late January. Some top players, including Roger Federer and Rafael Nadal, have said in the past that the tournament is held too soon after the Christmas and New Year holidays, and expressed a desire to consider shifting the tournament to February. Such a change, however, would move the tournament outside Australia's summer school holiday period, potentially impacting attendance figures.

Prior to 1996, the Australian Open rewarded fewer ATP rankings points than the other three Grand Slam tournaments. The reason cited by the ATP was the prize money offered by the Australian Open was far less than the other three majors.

=== Melbourne Park expansion ===
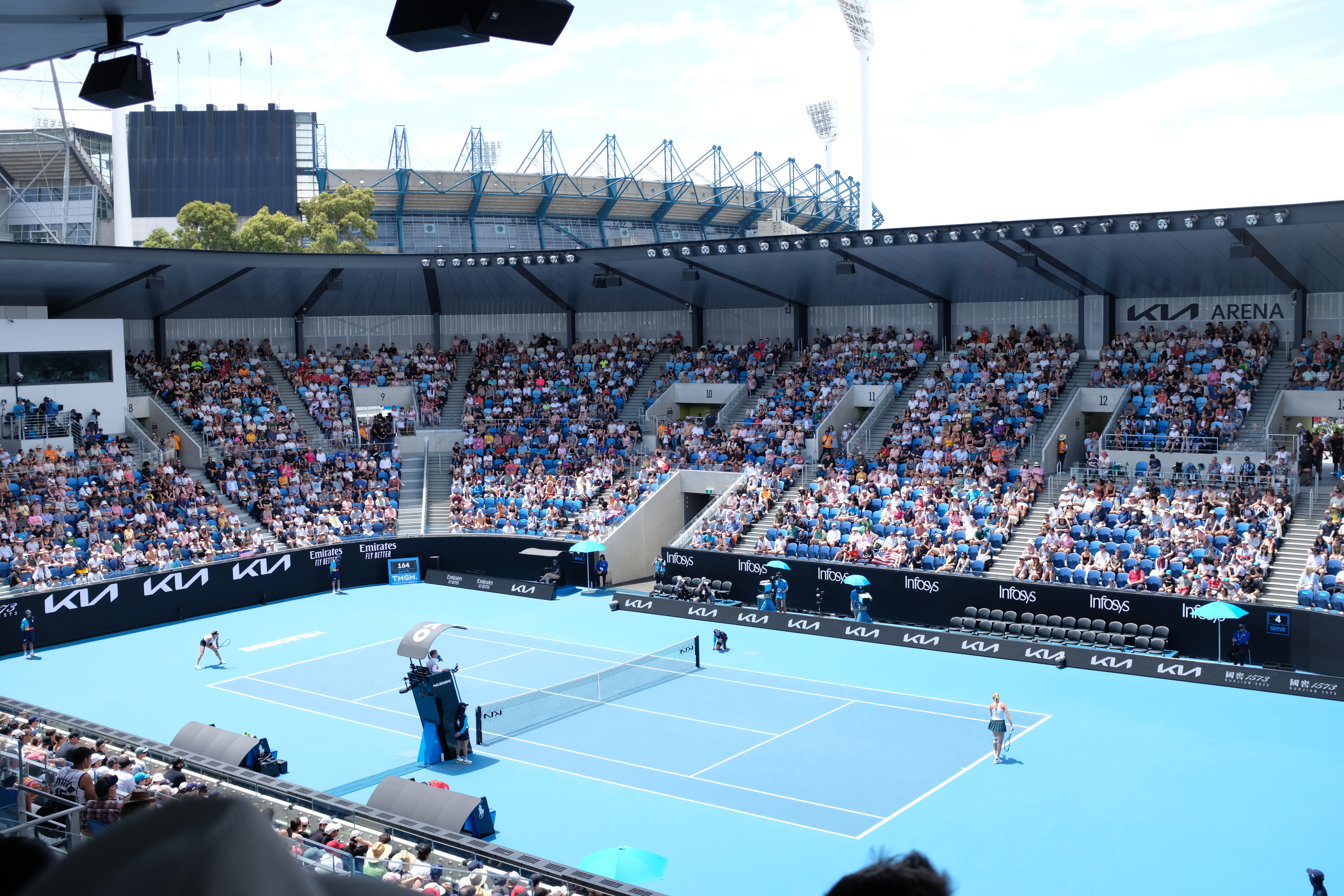
New Show Court Arena that opened in 2022

New South Wales and overseas authorities proposed becoming the new hosts of the tournament in 2008, though such a move never materialised. In any case, it was around this time the Melbourne Park precinct commenced upgrades which enhanced facilities for players and spectators. The precinct also aimed to provide more options of refreshments especially coffee to entertain the growing number of local and international visitors.

Notably a retractable roof was placed over Margaret Court Arena, making the Open the first of the four Grand Slams to have retractable roofs available on three of their main courts. The player and administrative facilities, as well as access points for spectators, were improved and the tournament site expanded its footprint out of Melbourne Park into nearby Birrarung Marr. A fourth major show court, seating 5,000 people was completed in late 2021, along with the rest of decade-long redevelopment, which included the Centrepiece ballroom, function and media building, as well as other upgraded facilities for players, administrators and spectators.

In December 2018, tournament organisers announced the Australian Open would follow the examples set by Wimbledon and the US Open and introduce tie-breaks in the final sets of men's and women's singles matches. Unlike Wimbledon and the US Open, which initiated conventional tie-breaks at 12–12 games and 6–6 games respectively, the Australian Open utilises a first to 10 points breaker at 6 games all. In 2020, the tournament organisers decided to replace the official court manufacturer to GreenSet, though retained the iconic blue cushioned acrylic hardcourt.

In 2021, in an effort to reduce the number of staff on-site due to the COVID-19 pandemic, all matches used electronic line judging. It marked the first-ever Grand Slam tournament to exclusively use electronic line judging; the 2020 US Open used it for matches outside of the two main stadium courts.

The Australian Open produced a range of NFTs in 2022.

Starting in 2024, the Australian Open began on a Sunday, one day earlier than usual. Day sessions on Rod Laver Arena and Margaret Court Arena featured a minimum of two matches (down from three) in an effort to reduce the possibility of matches finishing in the early hours of the following morning.

The 2025 Australian Open was the first Australian Open to present pickleball. From January 24 to the 26th the AO Pickleball Slam tournament was held on Court 3 at Melbourne Park. The invitational tournament awarded A$100,000 in prize money to some of Australia's top players and international participants.

== Courts ==
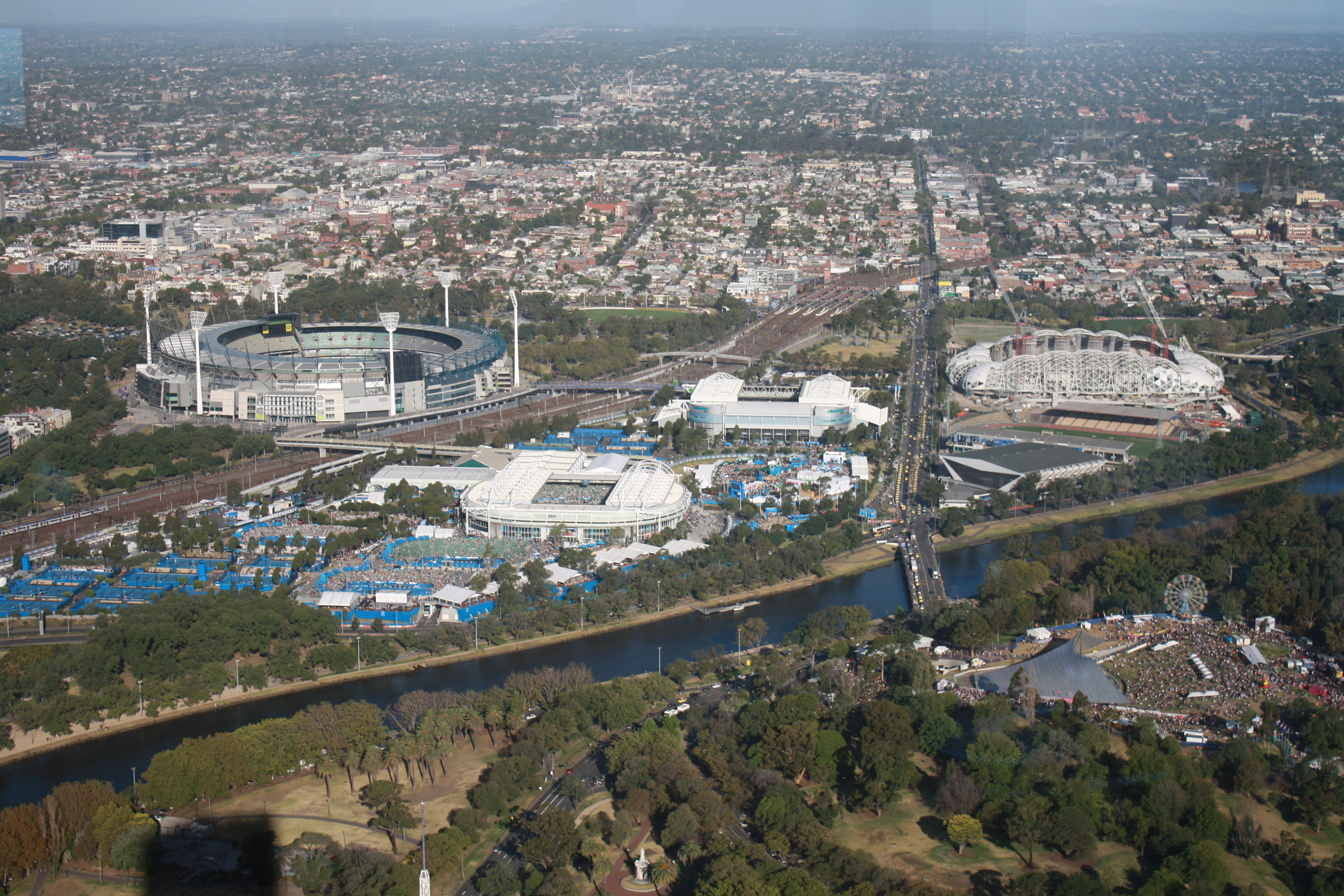
The Melbourne Sports and Entertainment precinct on the banks of the Yarra River in 2010.

The Australian Open is played at Melbourne Park, which is located in the Melbourne Sports and Entertainment Precinct; the event moved to this site in 1988. Currently three of the courts have retractable roofs, allowing play to continue during rain and extreme heat. As of 2017, spectators can also observe play at Show Courts 2 and 3, which have capacities of 3,000 each, as well as at Courts 4–17, 19 and 20 with the aid of temporary seating grandstands of capacity anywhere from 50 to 2,500.

Construction of a new 5,000 seat capacity stadium began in 2019 as part of a A$271 million redevelopment of the precinct. The new stadium, Kia Arena, was unveiled by Australian Open officials on 22 November 2021.

From 2008 to 2019, all of the courts used during the Australian Open were hard courts with Plexicushion acrylic surfaces (though Melbourne Park does have eight practice clay courts which are not used for the tournament). This replaced the Rebound Ace surface used from the opening of Melbourne Park. The ITF rated the surface's speed as medium. Since 2020, the courts have used a GreenSet surface.

=== Current courts ===
Court	Opened	Capacity	Arena Roof	Ref.
Rod Laver Arena	1988	14,820	Retractable	
John Cain Arena	2000	10,300	Retractable	
Margaret Court Arena (Formerly Show Court 1)	1988	7,500	Retractable	
Show Court Arena (Kia Arena)	2021	5,000	No	
Show Court 2 (1573 Arena)	1988	3,000	No	
Show Court 3 (ANZ Arena)	1988	3,000	No	

== Ranking points ==
Ranking points for the men (ATP) and women (WTA) have varied at the Australian Open through the years but presently players receive the following points:

Event		W	F	SF	QF	R16	R32	R64	R128	Q	Q3	Q2	Q1
Singles	Men	2000	1300	800	400	200	100	50	10	30	16	8	0
Singles	Women	2000	1300	780	430	240	130	70	10	40	30	20	2
Doubles	Men	2000	1200	720	360	180	90	0	–	–	–	–	–
Doubles	Women	2000	1300	780	430	240	130	10	–	–	–	–	–

== Prize money and trophies ==
The prize money awarded in the men's and women's singles tournaments is distributed equally. The total prize money for the 2026 tournament in Australian Dollars is A$111.5 million. The prize money distribution is as follows:

Event	W	F	SF	QF	4R	3R	2R	1R	Q3	Q2	Q1
Singles	A$4,150,000	A$2,150,000	A$1,250,000	A$750,000	A$480,000	A$327,750	A$225,000	A$150,000	A$83,500	A$57,000	A$40,500
Doubles	A$900,000	A$485,000	A$275,000	A$158,000	A$92,000	A$68,000	A$44,000	—N/a	—N/a	—N/a	—N/a

Doubles prize money is per team.

=== Trophies ===
The names of the tournament winners are inscribed on the perpetual trophy cups. In 2013, ABC Bullion, a Pallion company, was awarded the rights to make the Cups. The cups are produced by W. J. Sanders, a sister division within Pallion and takes over 250 hours to produce.

- The women's singles winner is presented with the Daphne Akhurst Memorial Cup.
- The men's singles winner is presented with the Norman Brookes Challenge Cup.

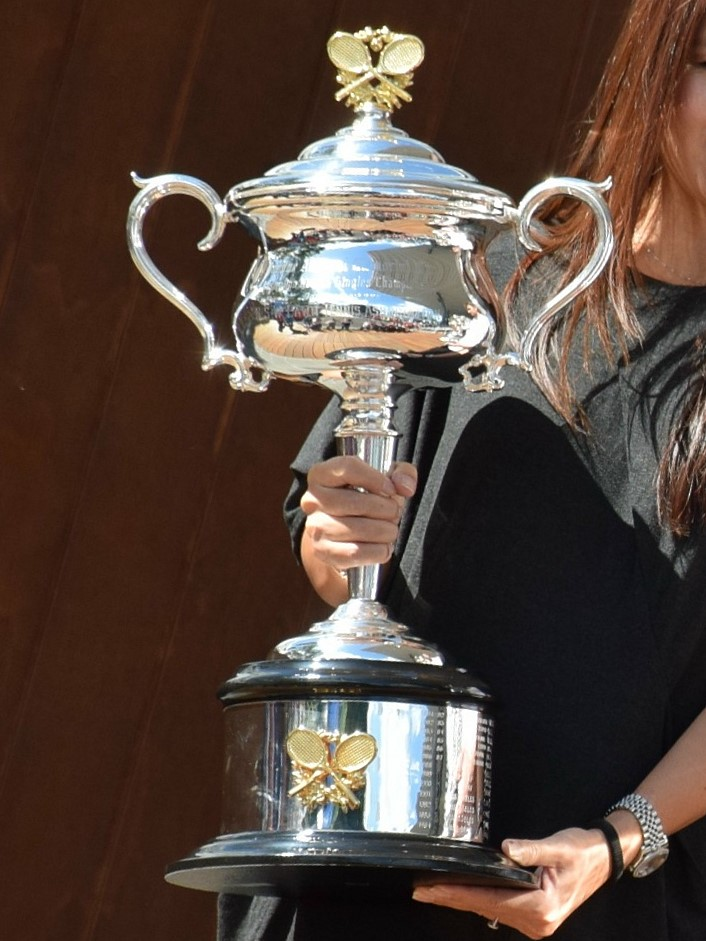
The Daphne Akhurst Memorial Cup.

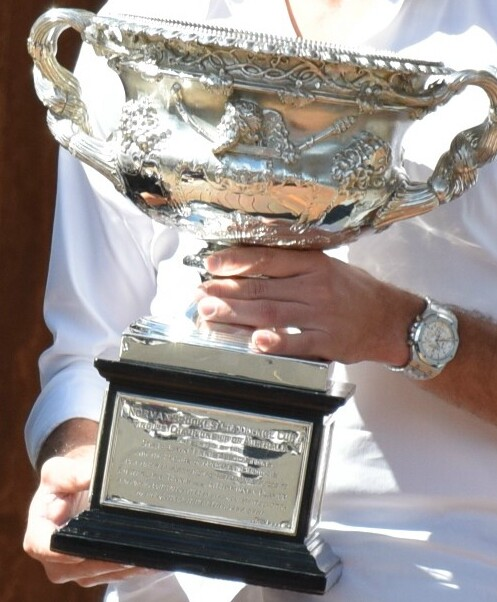
The Norman Brookes Challenge Cup.

== Champions ==
=== Former champions ===
- Men's singles
- Women's singles
- Men's doubles
- Women's doubles
- Mixed doubles
- All champions

=== Current champions ===
2026 Australian Open
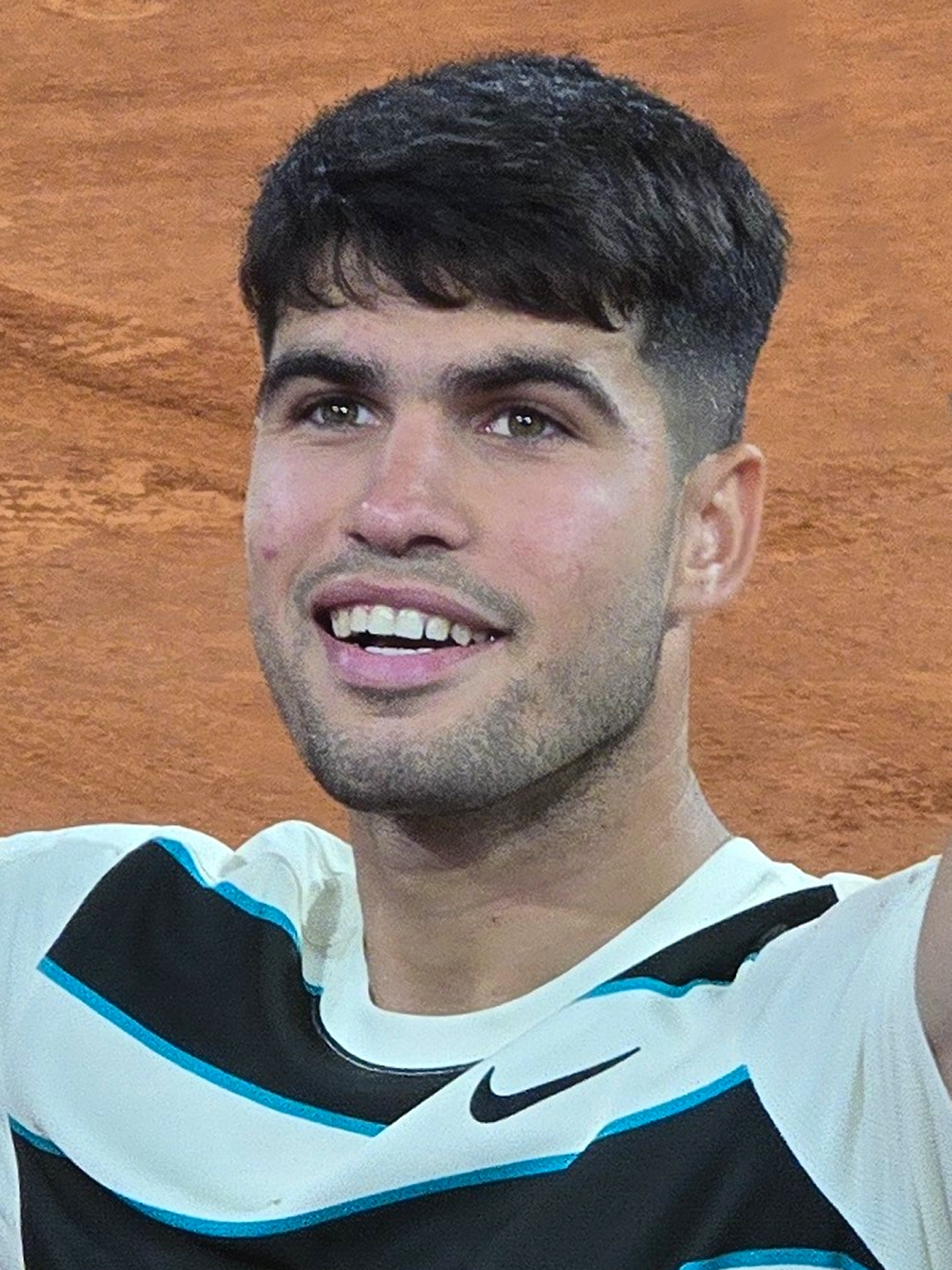
Carlos Alcaraz, 2026 men's singles champion.

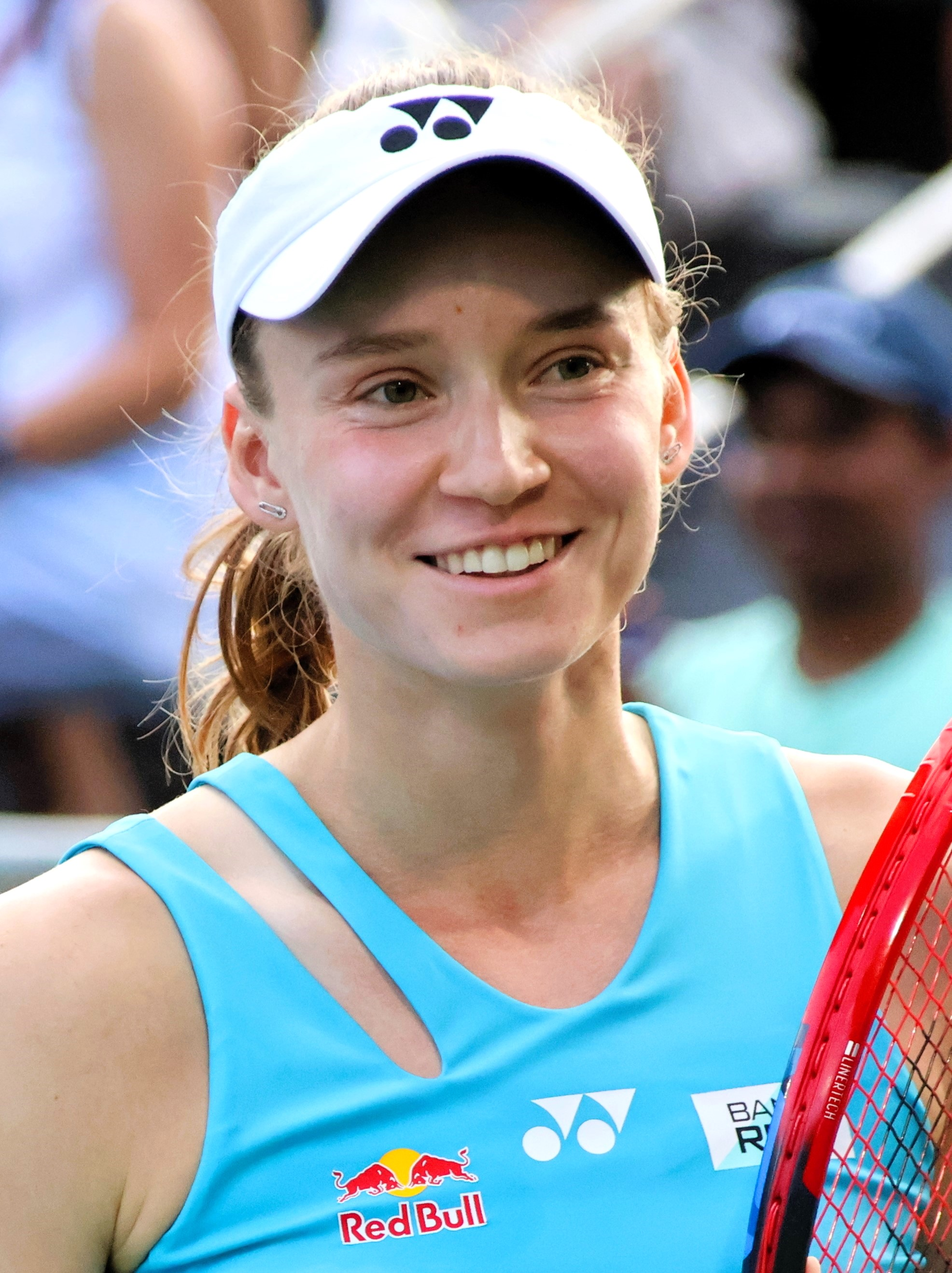
Elena Rybakina, 2026 women's singles champion.

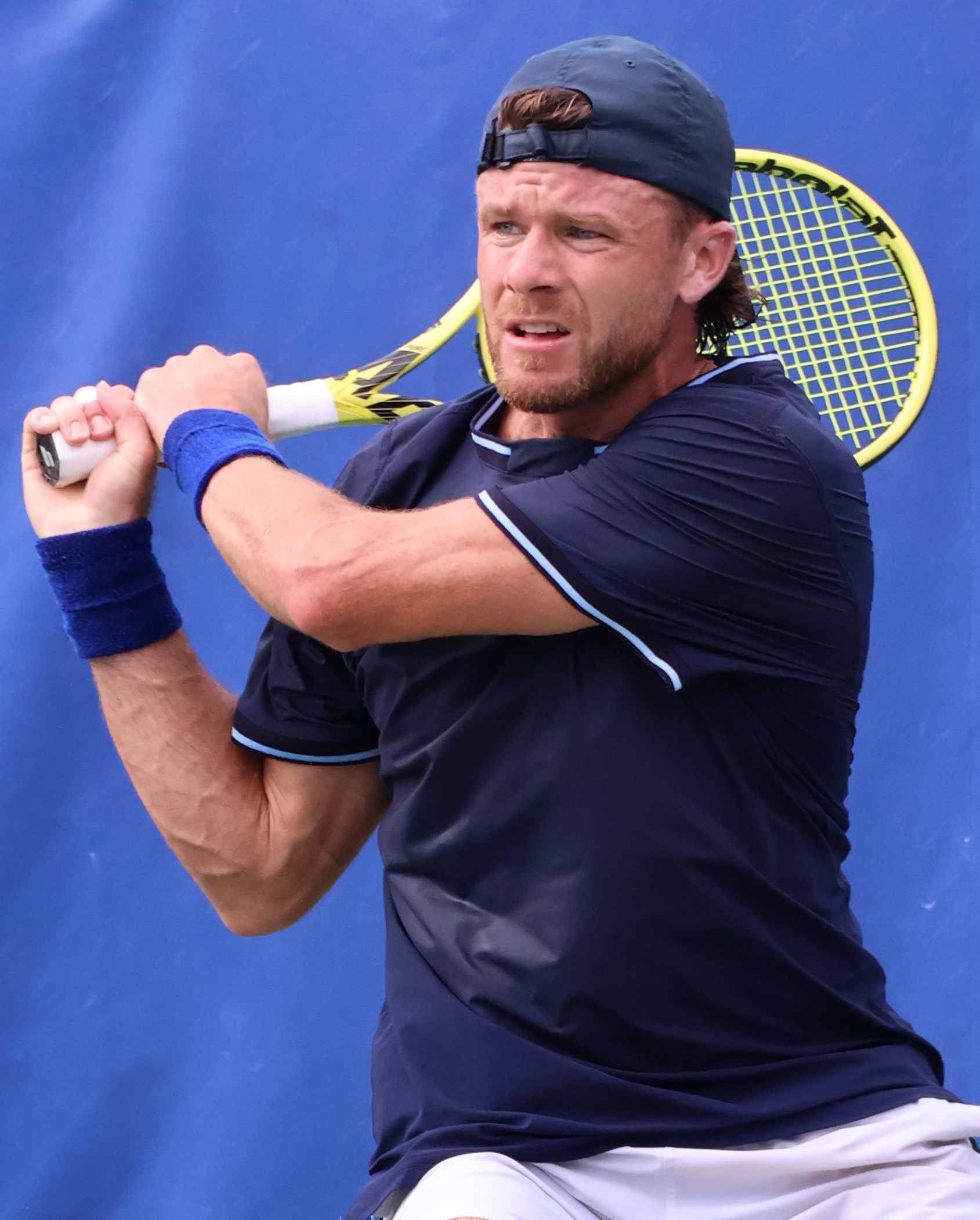
Christian Harrison was part of the 2026 winning men's doubles team.

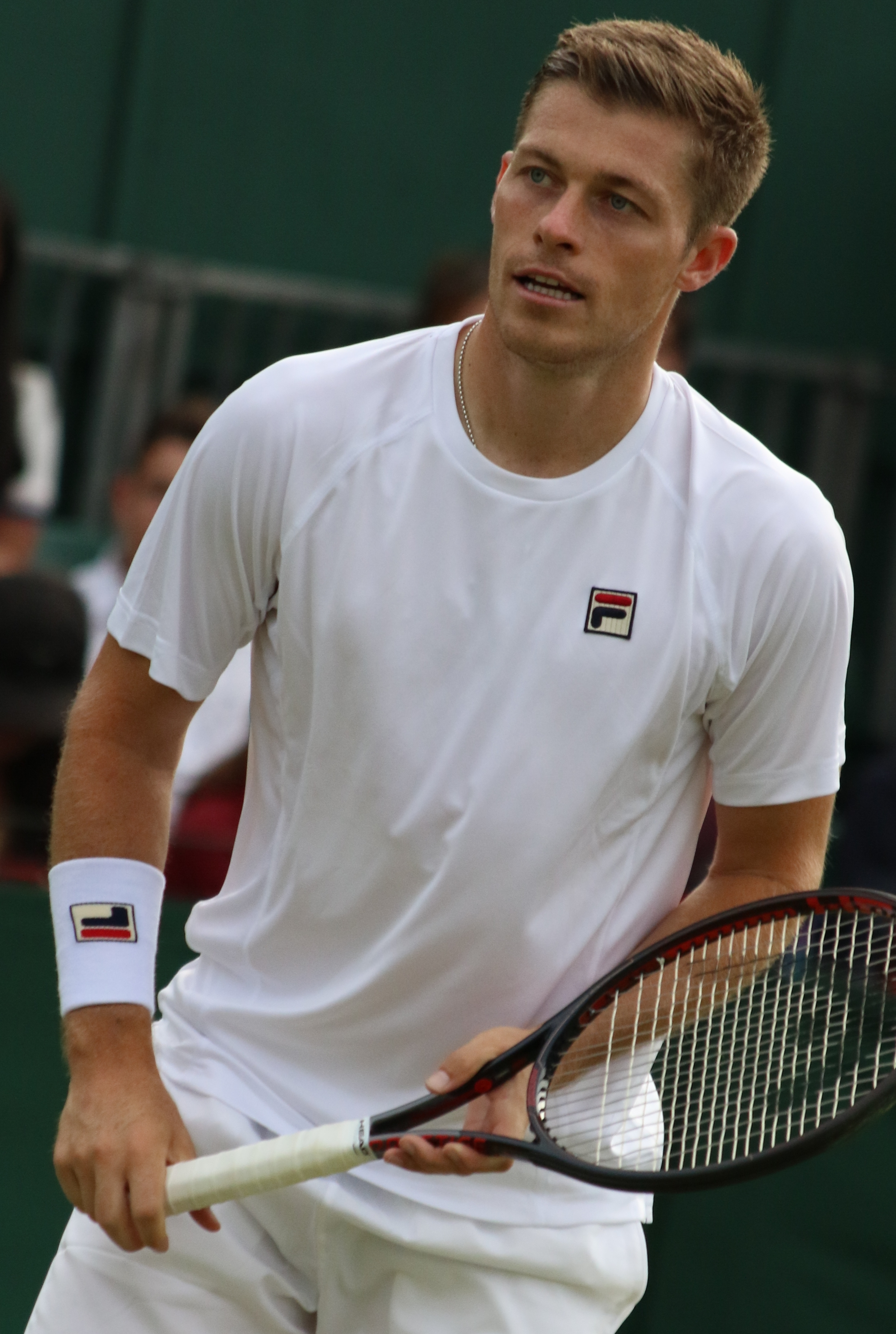
Neal Skupski was part of the 2026 winning men's doubles team.

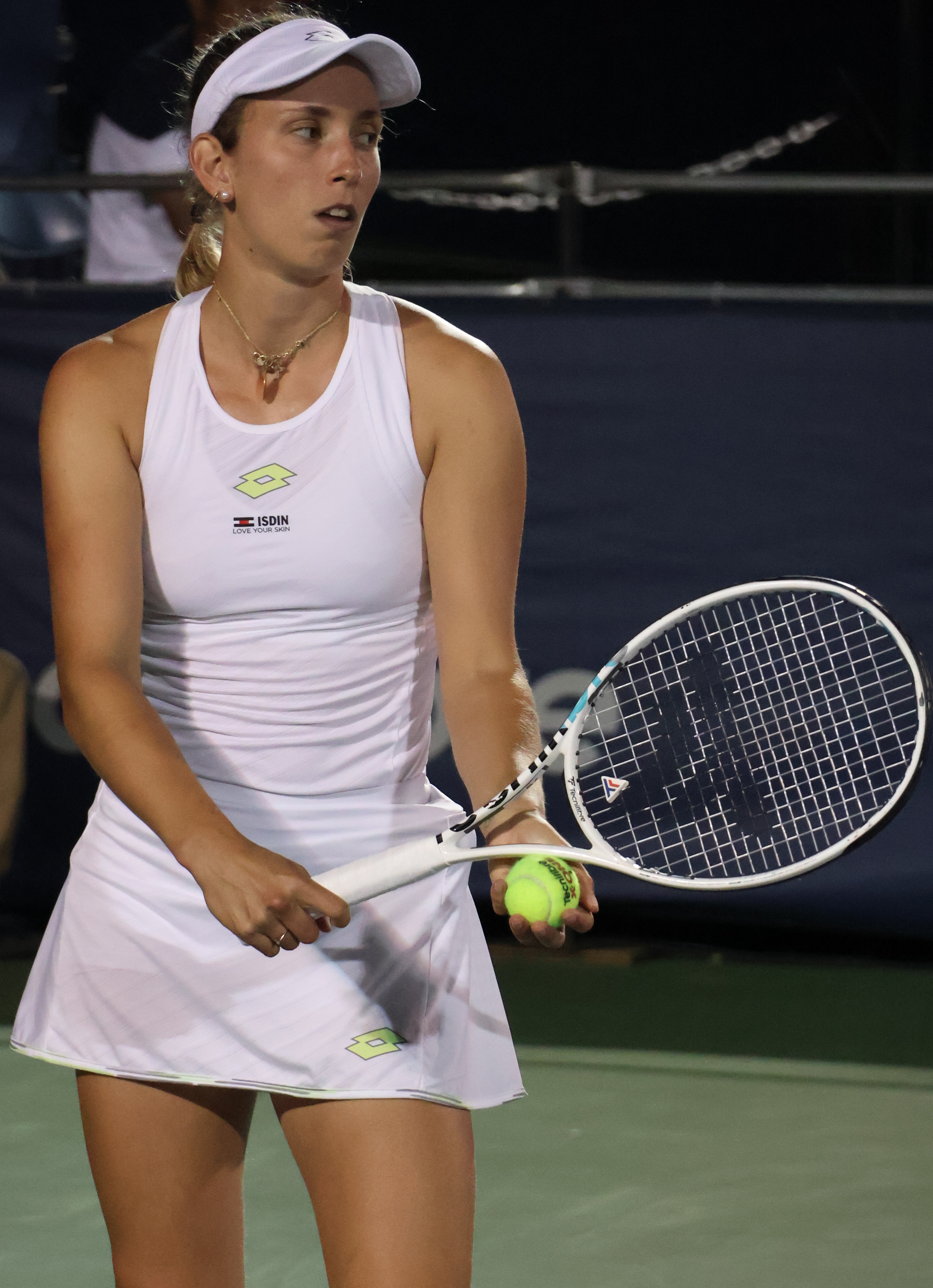
Elise Mertens was part of the 2026 winning women's doubles team.

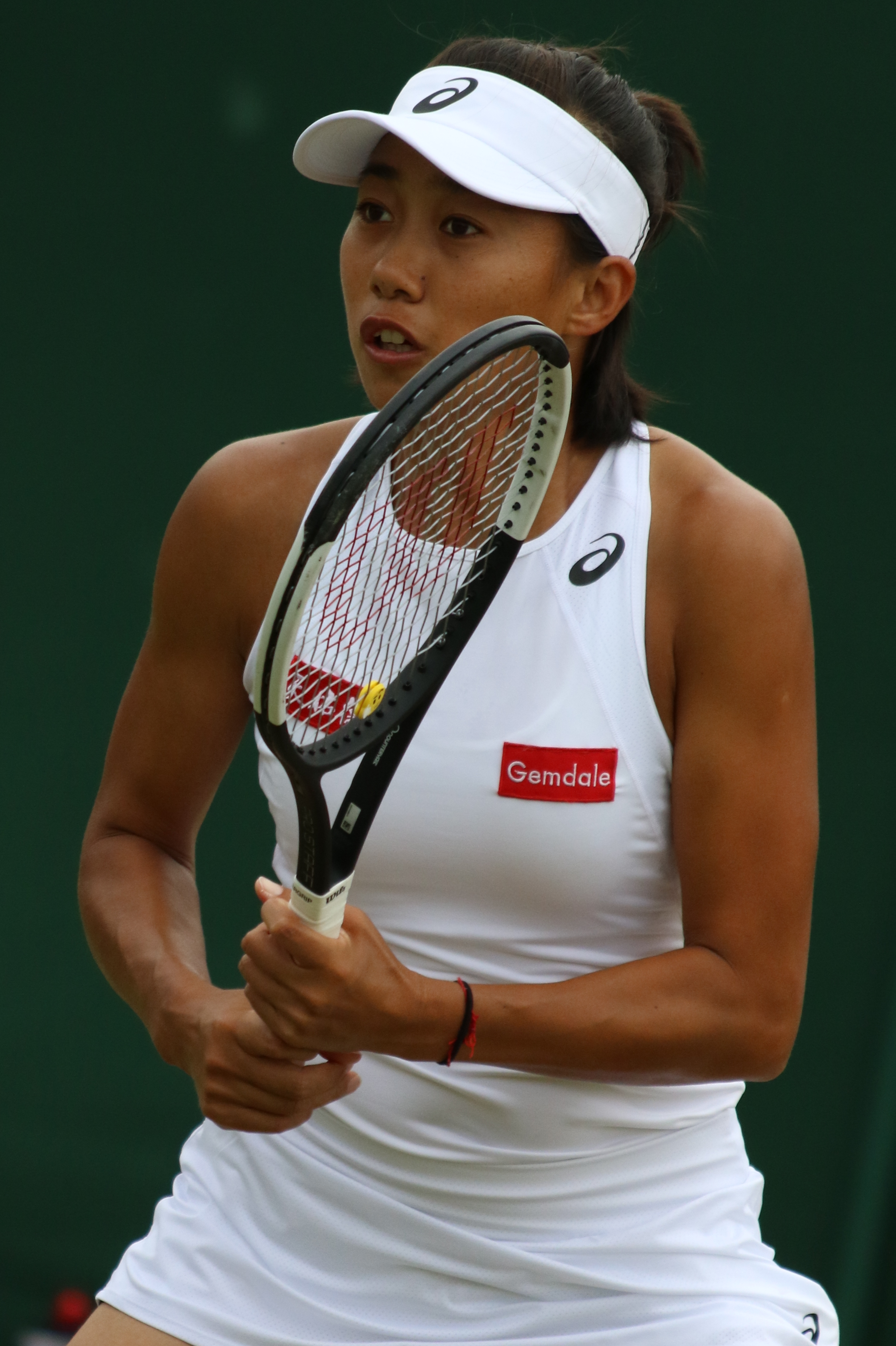
Zhang Shuai was part of the 2026 winning women's doubles team.

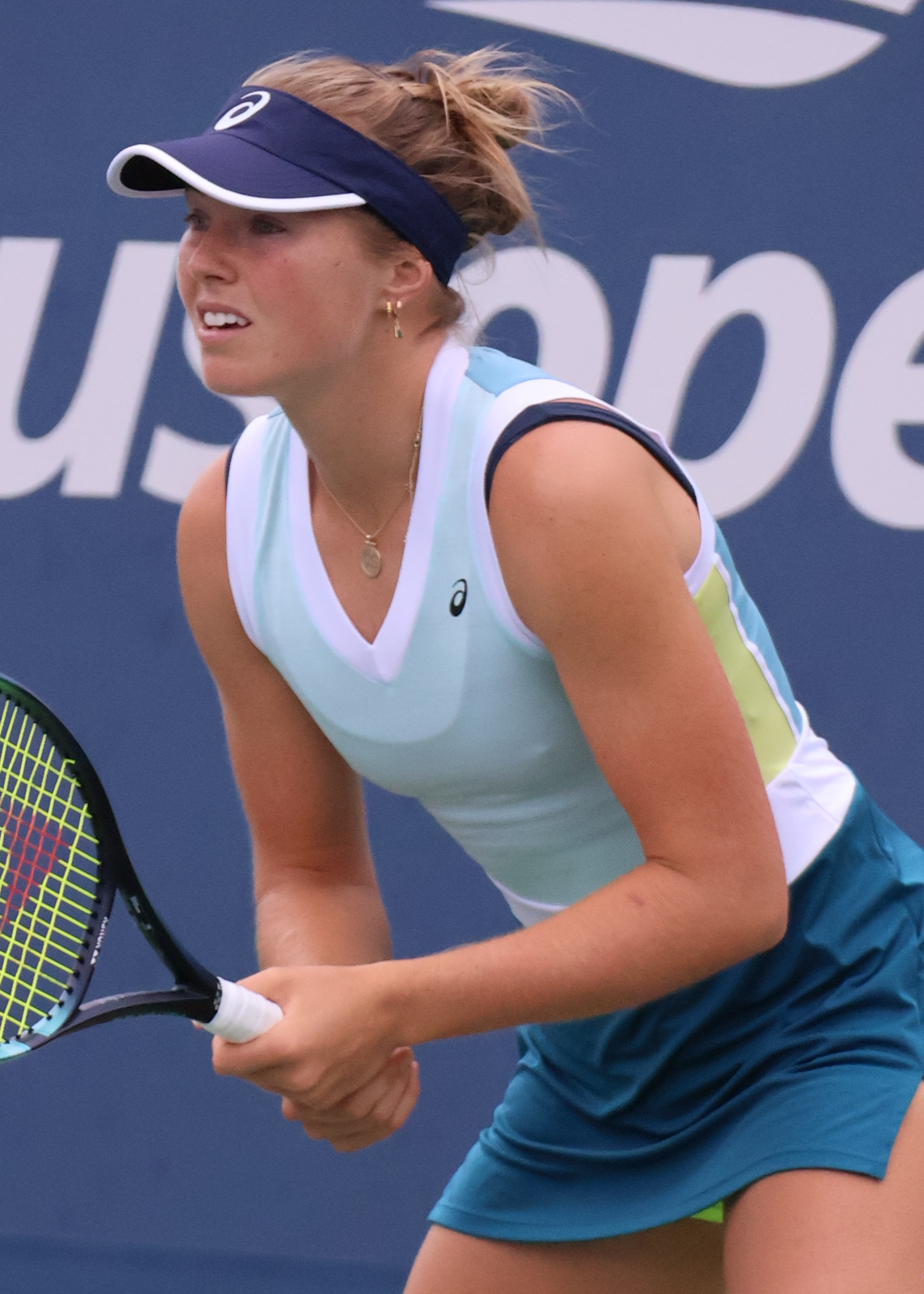
Olivia Gadecki was part of the 2026 winning mixed doubles team.

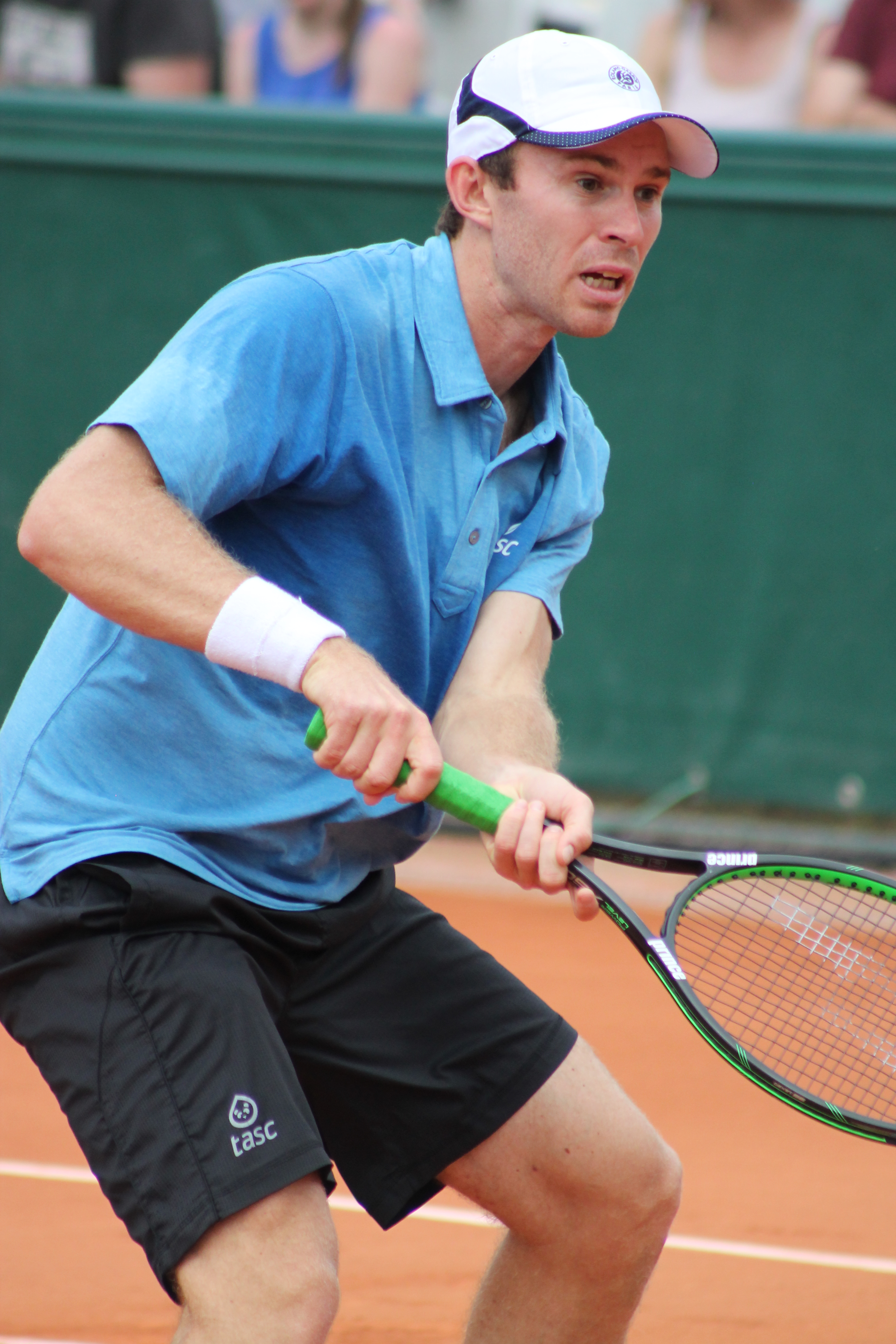
John Peers was part of the 2026 winning mixed doubles team.

=== Most recent finals ===
2026 Event	Champion	Runner-up	Score
Men's singles	(Spain) Carlos Alcaraz	(Serbia) Novak Djokovic	2–6, 6–2, 6–3, 7–5
Women's singles	(Kazakhstan) Elena Rybakina	Aryna Sabalenka	6–4, 4–6, 6–4
Men's doubles	(United States) Christian Harrison (United Kingdom) Neal Skupski	(Australia) Jason Kubler (Australia) Marc Polmans	7–6^{(7–4)}, 6–4
Women's doubles	(Belgium) Elise Mertens (China) Zhang Shuai	(Kazakhstan) Anna Danilina (Serbia) Aleksandra Krunić	7–6^{(7–4)}, 6–4
Mixed doubles	(Australia) Olivia Gadecki (Australia) John Peers	(France) Kristina Mladenovic (France) Manuel Guinard	4–6, 6–3, [10–8]

== Records ==
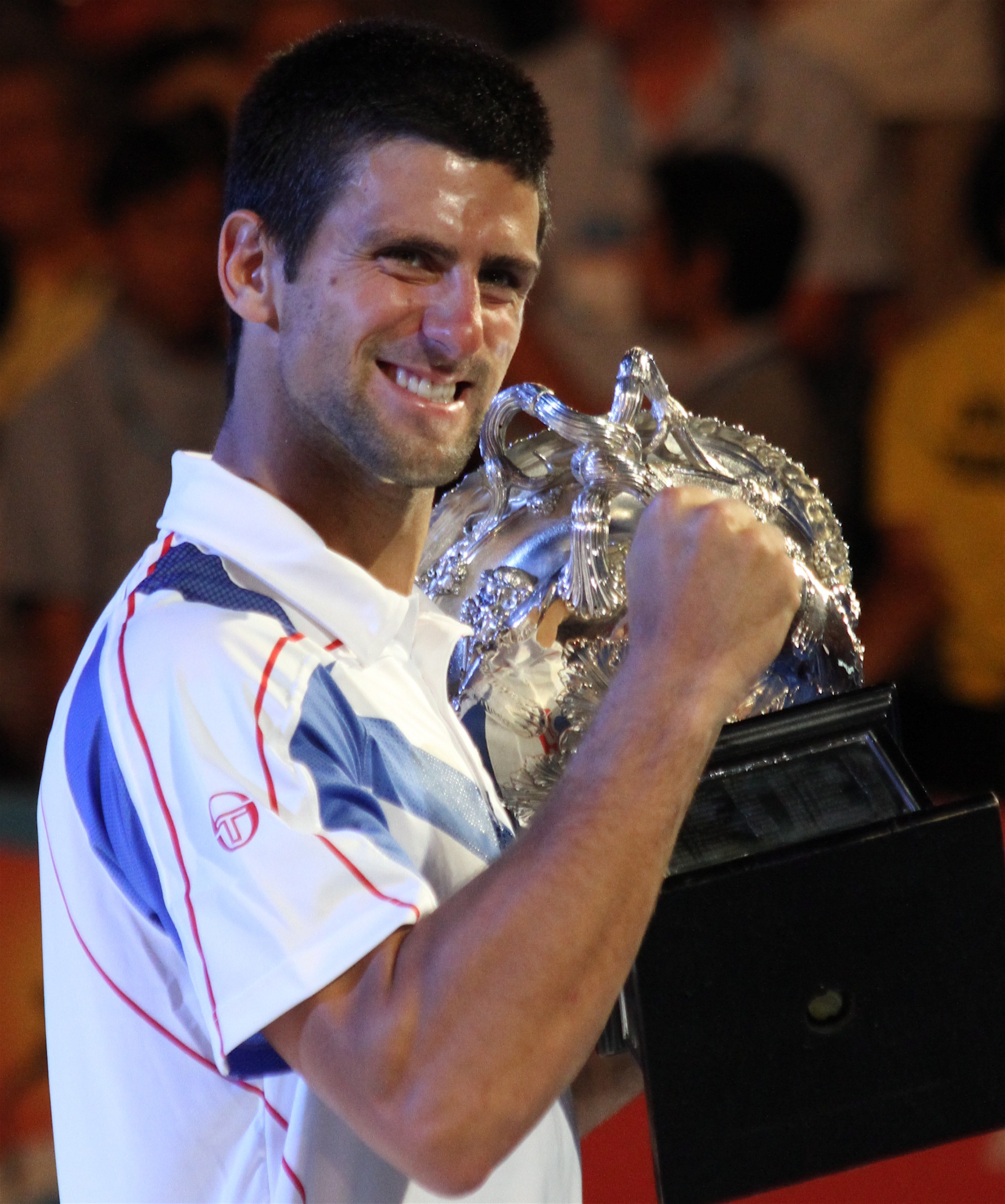
Novak Djokovic, the all-time record holder in men's singles.

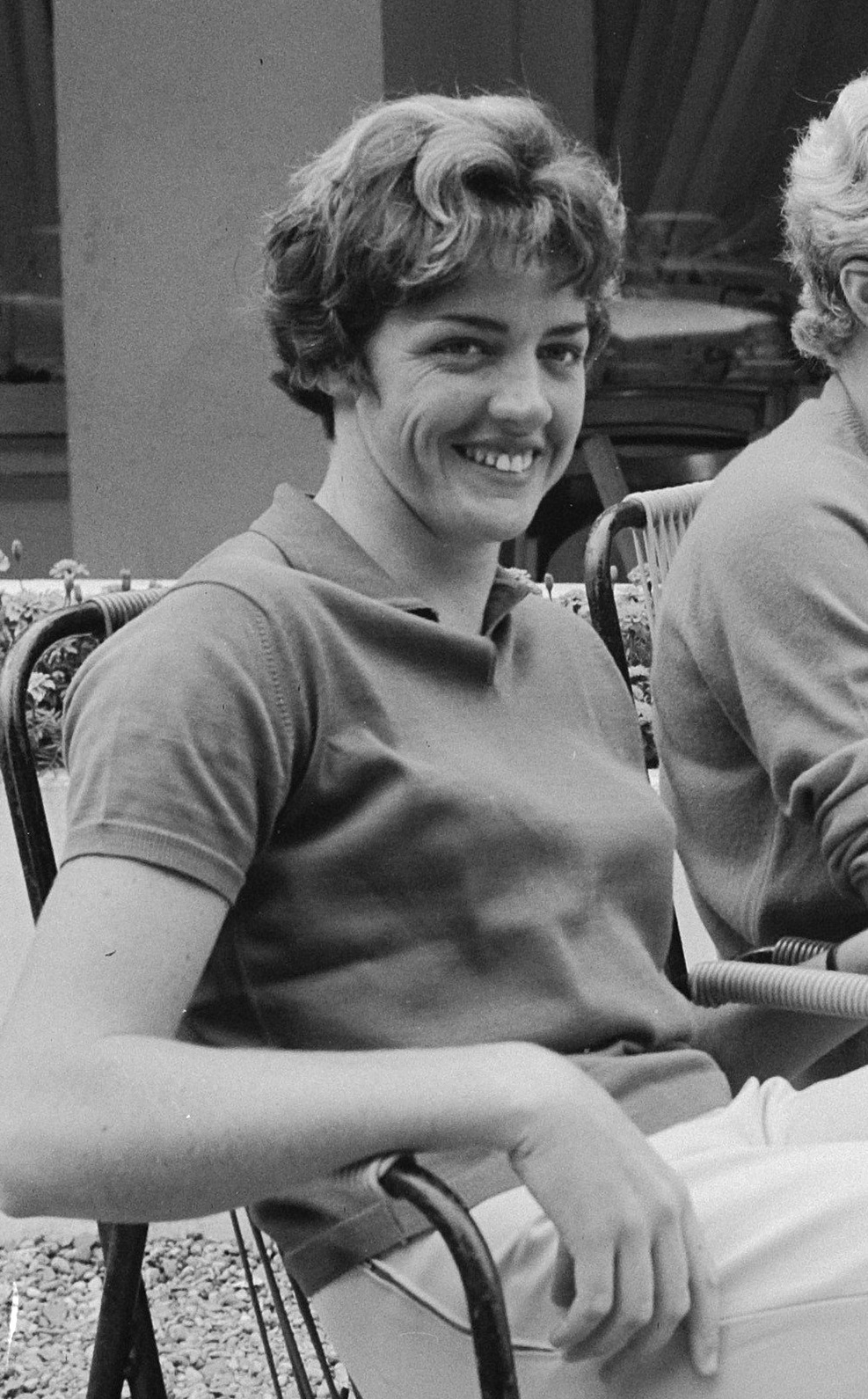
Margaret Court, the all-time record holder in women's singles.

- Unlike the other three Grand Slam tournaments, which became open in 1968, the Australian tournament opened to professionals in 1969.

Record	Era	Player(s)	Count	Years
Men since 1905
Most singles titles	Open Era	(Serbia) Novak Djokovic	10	2008, 2011–2013, 2015–2016, 2019–2021, 2023
Most singles titles	Amateur Era	(Australia) Roy Emerson	6	1961, 1963–1967
Most consecutive singles titles	Open Era	(Serbia) Novak Djokovic	3	2011–2013, 2019–2021
Most consecutive singles titles	Amateur Era	(Australia) Roy Emerson	5	1963–1967
Most doubles titles	Open Era	(United States) Bob Bryan (United States) Mike Bryan	6	2006–2007, 2009–2011, 2013
Most doubles titles	Amateur Era	(Australia) Adrian Quist	10	1936–1940, 1946–1950
Most consecutive doubles titles	Open Era	(United States) Bob Bryan (United States) Mike Bryan	3	2009–2011
Most consecutive doubles titles	Amateur Era	(Australia) Adrian Quist	10	1936–1940, 1946–1950
Most mixed doubles titles	Open Era	(United States) Jim Pugh (India) Leander Paes (Canada) Daniel Nestor	3	1988–1990; 2003, 2010, 2015; 2007, 2011, 2014
Most mixed doubles titles	Amateur Era	(Australia) Harry Hopman (Australia) Colin Long	4	1930, 1936–1937, 1939; 1940, 1946–1948
Most Championships (singles, doubles, mixed doubles)	Open Era	(Serbia) Novak Djokovic	10	2008–2023 (10 men's singles)
Most Championships (singles, doubles, mixed doubles)	Amateur Era	(Australia) Adrian Quist	13	1936–1950 (3 singles, 10 men's doubles, 0 mixed doubles)
Women since 1922
Most singles titles	All-time	(Australia) Margaret Court	11	1960–1966, 1969–1971, 1973
Most singles titles	Open Era	(United States) Serena Williams	7	2003, 2005, 2007, 2009, 2010, 2015, 2017
Most singles titles	Amateur Era	(Australia) Margaret Court	7	1960–1966
Most consecutive singles titles	Open Era	(Australia) Margaret Court (Australia) Evonne Goolagong Cawley (Germany) Steffi Graf (Socialist Federal Republic of Yugoslavia) / (Federal Republic of Yugoslavia) Monica Seles (Switzerland) Martina Hingis	3	1969–1971; 1974–1976; 1988–1990; 1991–1993; 1997–1999
Most consecutive singles titles	Amateur Era	(Australia) Margaret Court	7	1960–1966
Most doubles titles	Amateur Era	(Australia) Thelma Coyne Long	12	1936–1940, 1947–1949, 1951–1952, 1956, 1958
Most doubles titles	Open Era	(United States) Martina Navratilova	8	1980, 1982–1985, 1987–1989
Most consecutive doubles titles	Open Era	(United States) Martina Navratilova (United States) Pam Shriver	7	1982–1985, 1987–1989
Most consecutive doubles titles	Amateur Era	(Australia) Thelma Coyne Long (Australia) Nancye Wynne Bolton	5	1936–1940
Most mixed doubles titles	Open Era	(Czech Republic) Barbora Krejčíková	3	2019–2021
Most mixed doubles titles	Amateur Era	(Australia) Daphne Akhurst Cozens (Australia) Nell Hall Hopman (Australia) Nancye Wynne Bolton (Australia) Thelma Coyne Long	4	1924–1925, 1928–1929; 1930, 1936–1937, 1939; 1940, 1946–1948; 1951–1952, 1954–1955
Most Championships (singles, doubles, mixed doubles)	All-time	(Australia) Margaret Court	23	1960–1973 (11 singles, 8 women's doubles, 4 mixed doubles)
Most Championships (singles, doubles, mixed doubles)	Open Era	(United States) Martina Navratilova	12	1980–2003 (3 singles, 8 women's doubles, 1 mixed doubles)
Most Championships (singles, doubles, mixed doubles)	Amateur Era	(Australia) Nancye Wynne Bolton	20	1936–1952 (6 singles, 10 women's doubles, 4 mixed doubles)
Wheelchair: singles since 2002, doubles since 2004, quads since 2008
Most singles titles	Men	(Japan) Shingo Kunieda	11	2007–2011, 2013–2015, 2018, 2020, 2022
Most singles titles	Women	(Netherlands) Esther Vergeer	9	2002–2004, 2006–2009, 2011–2012
Most singles titles	Quads	(Australia) Dylan Alcott	7	2015–2021
Most consecutive singles titles	Men	(Japan) Shingo Kunieda	5	2007–2011
Most consecutive singles titles	Women	(Netherlands) Esther Vergeer (Netherlands) Diede de Groot	4	2006–2009; 2021–2024
Most consecutive singles titles	Quads	(Australia) Dylan Alcott	7	2015–2021
Most doubles titles	Men	(Japan) Shingo Kunieda	8	2007–2011, 2013–2015
Most doubles titles	Women	(Netherlands) Esther Vergeer (Netherlands) Aniek van Koot	7	2003–2004, 2006–2009, 2011–2012; 2010, 2013, 2017, 2019, 2021–2023
Most doubles titles	Quads	(United States) David Wagner	9	2008–2010, 2013–2017, 2022
Most consecutive doubles titles	Men	(Japan) Shingo Kunieda	5	2007–2011
Most consecutive doubles titles	Women	(Netherlands) Esther Vergeer (Netherlands) Diede de Groot	4	2006–2009; 2021–2024
Most consecutive doubles titles	Quads	(United States) David Wagner	5	2013–2017
Miscellaneous
Unseeded champions	Men	(Australia) Mark Edmondson	1976	
Unseeded champions	Women	(Australia) Chris O'Neil (United States) Serena Williams	1978; 2007	
Youngest singles champion	Men	(Australia) Ken Rosewall	18 years and 2 months (1953)	
Youngest singles champion	Women	(Switzerland) Martina Hingis	16 years and 4 months (1997)	
Oldest singles champion	Men	(Australia) Ken Rosewall	37 years and 2 months (1972)	
Oldest singles champion	Women	(Australia) Thelma Coyne Long	35 years and 8 months (1954)	

== Media coverage and attendance ==
From 1973 to 2018, the Seven Network served as the host broadcaster of the Australian Open. In March 2018, it was announced that the Nine Network had acquired the rights to the tournament beginning in 2020, for a period of five years. The network later bought the rights for the 2019 tournament as well. The Open's broadcast rights are lucrative in the country, as it occurs near the end of the Summer non-ratings season — which gives its broadcaster opportunities to promote their upcoming programming lineup. As of 2022, Nine has extended its rights to the Australian Open until 2029.

In Europe the tournament is broadcast on Eurosport. Other broadcasters in the region have included the BBC in the United Kingdom, SRG in Switzerland, NOS in Netherlands and RTS in Serbia. In the United Kingdom, the BBC dropped its live coverage of the 2016 tournament just a month before the start due to budget cuts, leaving Eurosport as the exclusive live broadcaster.

Elsewhere, beIN Sports broadcasts it into the Middle East and northern Africa, and SuperSport in sub-Sahara Africa. In the United States, the tournament is broadcast on ESPN2, ESPN3 and the Tennis Channel, with limited highlights airing on ABC. The championship matches are televised live on ESPN. While it is broadcast on ESPN International in Central and Latin America. It is broadcast on TSN in Canada.

In the Asia–Pacific region, the tournament is broadcast on five television networks in China, including national broadcaster CCTV, provincial networks Beijing TV, Shanghai Dragon TV and Guangdong TV and English language Star Sports, as well as online on iQIYI Sports. Elsewhere in the region, it is broadcast in Japan by national broadcaster NHK, and pay-TV network Wowow. In the Indian subcontinent, Sony Six has broadcast since 2015 and, in the rest of Asia, it is broadcast on Fox Sports Asia until the network's shutdown in 2021 and the rights is acquired by beIN Sports from 2022 except for Vietnam which will be broadcast on K+ until 2025. Through TV360, Viettel currently holds broadcast rights in Vietnam from 2026 onwards.

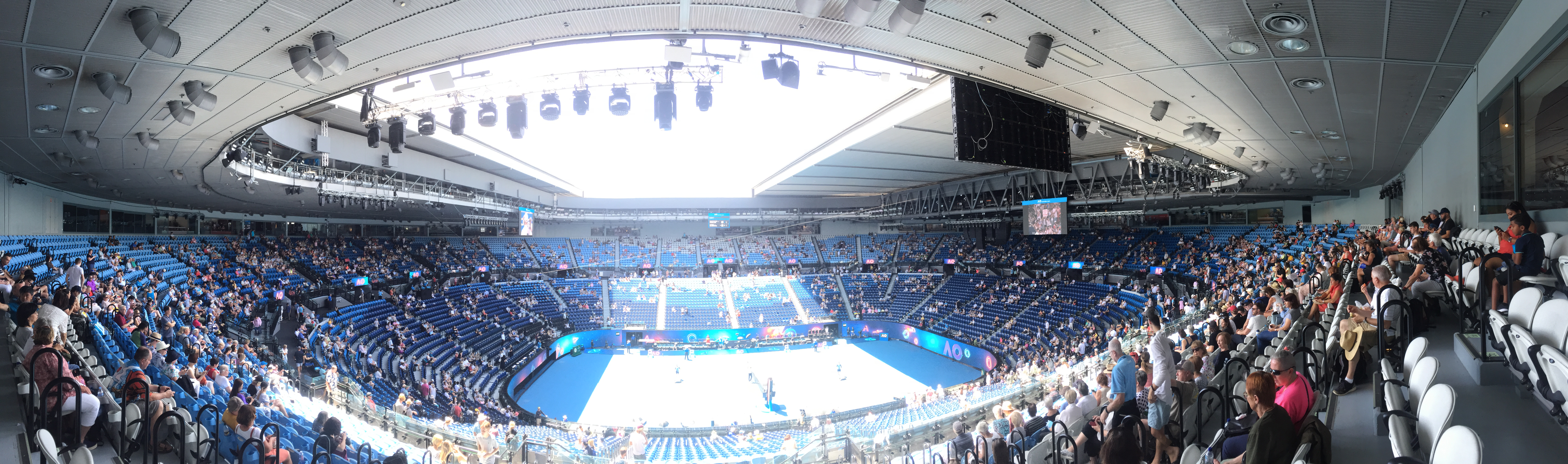
A panoramic view of Rod Laver Arena during a day session at the 2020 Australian Open

=== Attendance ===
The Australian Open is the most attended Grand Slam tournament. The tournament in 2025 set a new attendance record of 1,218,831 while the single-day attendance record is 97,132, recorded on the 17 January 2025.

The following record of attendance begins in 1987, when the tournament moved from being held in December to in January (the immediate preceding tournament was December 1985). 1987 was the last year that the Kooyong Tennis Club hosted the tournament; since 1988 it has been held at Melbourne Park. The average growth rate over the period covered below is more than 7%. Note that these figures include attendances for the week of qualifying and pre-main tournament events.

- 2026: 1,368,043
- 2025: 1,218,831
- 2024: 1,110,657
- 2023: 902,312
- 2022: 346,468 (Note: Crowds were restricted to around 50% of overall capacity throughout the tournament due to the COVID-19 pandemic.)
- 2021: 130,374 (Note: Crowds were permitted to attend only nine of the fourteen days of the tournament and were restricted to between 30% and 50% of overall capacity, due to the COVID-19 pandemic.)
- 2020: 812,174
- 2019: 796,435
- 2018: 743,667
- 2017: 728,763
- 2016: 720,363
- 2015: 703,899
- 2014: 643,280
- 2013: 684,457
- 2012: 686,006
- 2011: 651,127
- 2010: 653,860
- 2009: 603,160
- 2008: 605,735
- 2007: 554,858
- 2006: 550,550
- 2005: 543,873
- 2004: 521,691
- 2003: 512,225
- 2002: 518,248
- 2001: 543,834
- 2000: 501,251
- 1999: 473,296
- 1998: 434,807
- 1997: 391,504
- 1996: 389,598
- 1995: 311,678
- 1994: 332,926
- 1993: 322,074
- 1992: 329,034
- 1991: 305,048
- 1990: 312,000
- 1989: 289,023
- 1988: 244,859
- 1987: 140,089

== See also ==
- Australian Open extreme heat policy
- Australian Open series

Lists of champions

- List of Australian Open champions (all events)
  - List of Australian Open men's singles champions
  - List of Australian Open women's singles champions
  - List of Australian Open men's doubles champions
  - List of Australian Open women's doubles champions
  - List of Australian Open mixed doubles champions
- List of Australian Open singles finalists during the Open Era, records and statistics

Other Grand Slam tournaments

- French Open
- Wimbledon Championships
- US Open

== Notes ==
Preceded by US Open	Grand Slam Tournament; January	Succeeded by French Open
