= Pallion Group =

Australian precious metal services company

Pallion Group Pty Ltd
- Type: Private
- Founded: 1951
- Founder: Felix Parry
- Headquarters: Sydney, Australia
- Area served: Worldwide
- Key people: Philip Williams (Chairman); Andrew Cochineas (CEO)
- Services: Bullion, refining and minting, casting and Jewellery, fabricated metals, findings, goldsmithing and silversmithing, vaulting
- Website: pallion.com

Pallion designs, manufactures, and distributes precious metal products and related services. It is the largest precious metal services group in Australasia. Pallion is the result of the merger in 2014 of the ABC Bullion and Palloys Group of companies founded in 1972 and 1951 respectively. The group maintains its headquarters in Sydney, Australia and is a wholly privately owned group of companies with manufacturing facilities and offices in Sydney, Melbourne, Brisbane and Perth in Australia, Hong Kong, mainland China, Thailand and Western Europe.

Pallion broadly comprises six entities. These provide the following services: bullion and bullion trading; refining and minting; casting and custom jewellery; fabricated metals; wedding rings and electroplating; findings; goldsmithing, silversmithing and vaulting.

== Timeline ==
=== Beginnings ===
Palloys commenced operations as Palloys Refining Co in 1951, in Woollahra, Sydney. The business was the brainchild of Felix Parry (Felix Pisarewski) a Polish war hero who arrived in Australia as a refugee after the second world war. At its inception, Palloys Refining Co's business was solely related to the refining of precious metals sourced from the jewellery and dental industries.

In 1952, Palloys Refining Co entered into an agreement with Matthey Garrett. Pursuant to that agreement, Palloys Refining Co changed the focus of its business to the casting of jewellery and dental components utilising the lost wax method. It also changed its name to Palloys. In return, Matthey Garrett agreed to provide bulk precious metal refining services to Palloys. By 1955, Palloys was servicing burgeoning post war jewellery demand across Australia, New Zealand and Hong Kong. To cater to this increased global demand, Palloys Hong Kong commenced operations in 1962 in joint venture with Wheelock Marden Limited, now part of Wheelock & Co Limited. Palloys Hong Kong was the first company engaged in the casting of precious metals in Hong Kong.

=== External investment and diversification ===
In 1965, a 25% interest in Palloys was acquired by Wieland Edeinmetalle GMBH (now part of the Saxonia Franke Group). To this day, Palloys is the Australian distributor of Wieland Plating Products. In 1986 interests associated with the Kay family acquired the remaining 75% interest in Palloys.

In 1972, Australian Bullion Company (NSW) Pty Ltd commenced operation as a distributor of bullion products throughout Australia. It now trades under the name ABC Bullion, the largest independent bullion dealer in Australia and a cornerstone of the Australian gold trading system.

In 1990, Palloys diversified from the jewellery casting market into the manufacture and supply of fabricated alloyed precious metal in various forms: wire; sheet; solders; milled wedding rings; and precious metal refining services. It did so through a joint venture agreement with Bullion Mark Pty Ltd, a company associated with Mr P.J. Williams and Harringtons Limited, a listed Australian public company and now part of the Perth Mint. The new joint venture entity was called Alloy & Gold Supply (NSW) Pty Ltd. Through various mergers and acquisitions, the non-Palloys 50% interest was acquired by AGR Matthey, itself a joint venture between the Perth Mint, Australian Gold Alliance (a wholly owned subsidiary of Newmont) and Johnson Matthey.

=== Growth ===
In late 2007, new interests acquired Palloys and its interest in Alloy & Gold Supply (NSW) Pty Ltd. In 2008, Palloys acquired the AGR Matthey interest in Alloy & Gold Supply (NSW) Pty Ltd and also the AGR Matthey jewellery division. Alloy & Gold Supply (NSW) Pty Ltd was renamed AGS Metals Pty Ltd and the Palloys Group was born.

In 2008, Palloys Group launched what was to become the largest CAD/CAM jewellery rapid prototyping and manufacturing division in Australia. Further diversification occurred with the incorporation of the Australian jewellery findings arm of the group, Regentco in 2009. In 2011, Palloys Group expanded its fabricated metals manufacturing base with the acquisition of P.J Williams Pty Ltd by AGS Metals Pty Ltd which was renamed AGS|PJW.

Commencing in 2009 and completing in 2014, Palloys Group acquired Goldenage International Limited (GAI). With offices and manufacturing facilities in Hong Kong SAR and mainland China, GAI is a world leader in volume findings production. In 2013 GAI expanded its product offering to include premium custom jewellery production for some of the world's best known jewellery brands.

As of 2012, the group's international headquarters moved to Sydney. Also in 2012, Palloys Group and ABC Bullion formed a joint venture to acquire ABC Refinery which is now the largest private refiner and assayer of precious metals in Australia. In 2014, ABC Refinery was awarded NATA accreditation, compliant with ISO (International Organization for Standardization) and IEC (International Electrotechnical Commission) Standard 17025:2005 for the analysis of gold, silver and their alloys. In addition, ABC Refinery has been accredited as compliant with Standards Australia and ILAC (International Laboratory Accreditation Cooperation). In 2013, Palloys Group and ABC Bullion commenced trading of ABC Bullion in Hong Kong to cater to increasing demand from Asia for bullion and related products. Also in that year, the entities opened Custodian Vaults in Australia – a private secure vaulting operation.

In 2014, ABC Refinery commenced construction of a new minting facility in Australia catering to public and private institutional demand. In 2014, the jewellery division of Pallion was named Australian Best Jewellery Supplier in the inaugural Australian Jewellery Industry Awards.

=== Merger and accreditation ===
In late 2014, the ABC Bullion and Palloys Group of companies financially merged under a new holding company, Pallion, a top 3 Australian private company by revenue. It is owned by interests associated with the Cochineas, Gregg and Simpson families. Today, Pallion has manufacturing facilities and offices in Sydney, Melbourne, Brisbane and Perth in Australia, Hong Kong, mainland China, Thailand and Italy.

In February 2015, Palloys was named Australian Best Jewellery Manufacturer at the Australian Jewellery Industry Awards. In April 2015, a long-standing association with A&E Metals was formalised in the acquisition by Pallion of A&E Metals. In November 2015, ABC Bullion was awarded the manufacturing rights to the Melbourne Cup by the Victoria Racing Club. ABC Bullion is the third manufacturer of the Melbourne Cup in its entire history. Melbourne Cups produced by ABC Bullion are the first Melbourne Cups made from metal that has been mined, fabricated and assembled wholly within Australia. In February 2018 it was announced by the Victorian Racing Club that Lexus was to be the new major sponsor for the Melbourne Cup. In December 2015, ABC Refinery was appointed to The London Bullion Market Association Good Delivery list for gold.

=== Further globalisation ===
In April 2018, ABC Refinery was officially accredited by the Shanghai Gold Exchange. The accreditation makes it one of only seven international companies approved to sell gold directly to China. In August 2018, Pallion acquired WJ Sanders, Australia's last traditional manufacturing silversmith. In late 2018, ABC Refinery became the first major precious metals refinery in the world to install an Acidless Refining System (ALS) that uses no harmful acids and produces no environmentally harmful emissions. To date, ABC Refinery operates the world's largest ALS refining capacity.

In May 2019, Palloys became Australia's first jewellery manufacturer and wholesaler to be certified by the Responsible Jewellery Council (RJC). To date, it is the only Australian wholesaler and manufacturer to be so accredited.

In June 2020, ABC Refinery was accredited by the CME Group. The accreditation saw ABC Refinery bars added to the COMEX good delivery list of brands used to physically settle against the GC gold futures contract in New York. In July 2020, AE Metals, AGS| PJW, Regentco and Palloys amalgamated under the Palloys brand name. The Palloys brand now services the global jewellery business to business market under a single trading name.

In November 2021, ABC Refinery was appointed to The London Bullion Market Association Good Delivery list for silver as well as the COMEX good delivery list of brands used to physically settle against the SI silver futures contract in New York. These appointments make ABC Refinery the only independent gold and silver refinery in Australia accredited by the London Bullion Market Association and COMEX.

In May 2023, ABC Bullion opened its global retail flagship in Martin Place, Sydney.

== Products and significant projects ==
Pallion products are sold internationally with a focus on Asian, North American and Western European markets. Its range of products and services can be broadly summarised as follows:

- Bullion and bullion trading
- Refining and minting
- Casting and custom jewellery
- Fabricated metals, wedding rings and electroplating
- Findings
- Gold and silversmithing
- Vaulting

Pallion entities provide precious metal products and services to central banks, investments banks, investors and wholesale jewellery groups. Pallion products also used to commemorate some of the world's largest sporting and horse racing events, for premium car restoration companies, government security forces and international movie production houses. Pallion entities also provide metal product design services to the Australian Federal Government. Significant public and private institutional projects in respect of which Pallion entities have been involved include:

- 1980: Assay of one of the world's largest gold natural nuggets – the Hand of Faith
- 1988: Mounts supplied for Queen Elizabeth II's Australian State Coach. The Australian State Coach was used to convey the Prince of Wales, the Duchess of Cornwall and Mr and Mrs Middleton from Westminster Abbey to Buckingham Palace following the Wedding of Prince William and Catherine Middleton on 29 April 2011
- 1998: Supply of gold lettering for the Australian War Memorial Tomb of the Unknown Soldier
- 2001: Supply of the iconostas for a Black Madonna Icon presented to and blessed by Pope John Paul II
- 2013: Mounts supplied for Queen Elizabeth II's Diamond Jubilee Coach (ridden by Queen Elizabeth II at the state opening of the British Parliament on 4 June 2014 session)
- 2015: ABC Bullion awarded production rights to the Melbourne Cup suite trophies by the Victorian Racing Club
- 2020: ABC Bullion awarded production rights to the ATP Cup
- 2022: ABC Bullion awarded production rights to the Australian Open suite of trophies. Pallion donates the Pallion Garden Terrace to the Art Gallery of New South Wales.

== Facilities ==
Pallion is the largest precious metal services group in Australasia. It has manufacturing facilities located in Sydney, Melbourne, Hong Kong, Shenzhen China, Thailand and Western Europe. Its production facilities are the most technologically advanced of their type in Australia with the largest fabricated precious metal production capacity in the region, capable of producing in over 70 proprietary precious metal alloys daily.

Sales and distribution facilities are located throughout Australia, Hong Kong, mainland China, Thailand and Italy.
