= Lawn Tennis Association of Australasia =

Lawn Tennis Association of Australasia (LTAA) was the tennis organisation formed after the amalgamation of New Zealand Lawn Tennis Association (now Tennis New Zealand) and six Australian state tennis associations in 1904. New Zealand split from the tennis association partnership in 1922 and hence caused dissolution of LTAA. LTAA was the founding member of the International Lawn Tennis Federation (ILTF) (now World Tennis), which was established in a conference in Paris, France on 1 March 1913. The LTAA is now the governing body for tennis is Australia and is known an Tennis Australia.

The main motive behind the amalgamation of tennis associations of New Zealand and Australia was to develop an international tennis tournament on the basis of French Open, US Open and Wimbledon, which resulted in the formation of Australasian Championships (later become Australian Championships, in 1927, and the Australian Open in 1969). The organisation also worked in the development of tennis in both Australia and New Zealand
