= 2012 ITF Wheelchair Tennis Tour =

Wheelchair tennis circuit

The 2012 ITF Wheelchair Tennis Tour is the global elite professional wheelchair tennis circuit organized by the International Tennis Federation (ITF) for the 2012 tennis season. The 2012 ITF Wheelchair Tennis Tour calendar comprises the Grand Slam tournaments, the Wheelchair Tennis Masters, the ITF Super Series, the ITF 1 series, the ITF 2 series, the ITF 3 series, and the ITF Futures series.

== Schedule ==
This is the complete schedule of Grand Slams and events in the ITF Masters Series, ITF Super Series and the ITF 1 Series on the 2012 calendar.

=== Key ===
Grand Slam tournaments
ITF Masters Series
ITF Super Series
ITF 1 Series
ITF 2 Series
ITF 3 Series
ITF Futures Series

=== January ===
Date	Tournament	Event	Champions
January 20	Sydney International Wheelchair Open (Australia) Sydney, Australia; ITF Super Series, Hard	Men's singles	Michaël Jérémiasz (FRA)
January 20	Sydney International Wheelchair Open (Australia) Sydney, Australia; ITF Super Series, Hard	Men's doubles	Richard Engles (AUS); Keegan Oh-Chee (AUS)
January 20	Sydney International Wheelchair Open (Australia) Sydney, Australia; ITF Super Series, Hard	Women's singles	Esther Vergeer (NED)
January 20	Sydney International Wheelchair Open (Australia) Sydney, Australia; ITF Super Series, Hard	Women's doubles	Marjolein Buis (NED); Aniek van Koot (NED)
January 20	Sydney International Wheelchair Open (Australia) Sydney, Australia; ITF Super Series, Hard	Quad Singles	Noam Gershony (ISR)
January 20	Sydney International Wheelchair Open (Australia) Sydney, Australia; ITF Super Series, Hard	Quad Doubles	Noam Gershony (ISR); David Wagner (USA)
January 25	Australian Open (Australia) Melbourne, Australia; Grand Slam, Hard	Men's singles	Maikel Scheffers (NED)
January 25	Australian Open (Australia) Melbourne, Australia; Grand Slam, Hard	Men's doubles	Robin Ammerlaan (NED); Ronald Vink (NED)
January 25	Australian Open (Australia) Melbourne, Australia; Grand Slam, Hard	Women's singles	Esther Vergeer (NED)
January 25	Australian Open (Australia) Melbourne, Australia; Grand Slam, Hard	Women's doubles	Esther Vergeer (NED); Sharon Walraven (NED)
January 25	Australian Open (Australia) Melbourne, Australia; Grand Slam, Hard	Quad Singles	Peter Norfolk (GBR)
January 25	Australian Open (Australia) Melbourne, Australia; Grand Slam, Hard	Quad Doubles	Andrew Lapthorne (GBR); Peter Norfolk (GBR)

=== February ===
Date	Tournament	Event	Champions
February 16	ABN Amro World Wheelchair Tennis Tournament (Netherlands) Rotterdam, Netherlands; ITF 1 Series, Hard	Men's singles	Ronald Vink (NED)

=== March ===
Date	Tournament	Event	Champions
March 21	Cajun Classic (United States) Baton Rouge, United States; ITF 1 Series, Hard	Men's singles	Stéphane Houdet (FRA)
March 21	Cajun Classic (United States) Baton Rouge, United States; ITF 1 Series, Hard	Men's doubles	Michaël Jérémiasz (FRA); Nicolas Peifer (FRA)
March 21	Cajun Classic (United States) Baton Rouge, United States; ITF 1 Series, Hard	Women's singles	Aniek van Koot (NED)
March 21	Cajun Classic (United States) Baton Rouge, United States; ITF 1 Series, Hard	Women's doubles	Jiske Griffioen (NED); Aniek van Koot (NED)
March 21	Cajun Classic (United States) Baton Rouge, United States; ITF 1 Series, Hard	Quad Singles	Andrew Lapthorne (GBR)
March 21	Cajun Classic (United States) Baton Rouge, United States; ITF 1 Series, Hard	Quad Doubles	Nicholas Taylor (USA); David Wagner (USA)
March 28	Pensacola Open (United States) Pensacola, United States; ITF 1 Series, Hard	Men's singles	Stéphane Houdet (FRA)
March 28	Pensacola Open (United States) Pensacola, United States; ITF 1 Series, Hard	Men's doubles	Michaël Jérémiasz (FRA); Gordon Reid (GBR)
March 28	Pensacola Open (United States) Pensacola, United States; ITF 1 Series, Hard	Women's singles	Esther Vergeer (NED)
March 28	Pensacola Open (United States) Pensacola, United States; ITF 1 Series, Hard	Women's doubles	Jiske Griffioen (NED); Aniek van Koot (NED)
March 28	Pensacola Open (United States) Pensacola, United States; ITF 1 Series, Hard	Quad Singles	Marcus Jonsson (SWE)
March 28	Pensacola Open (United States) Pensacola, United States; ITF 1 Series, Hard	Quad Doubles	Nicholas Taylor (USA); David Wagner (USA)

=== April ===
Date	Tournament	Event	Champions
April 4	Florida Open (United States) Boca Raton, United States; ITF Super Series, Hard	Men's singles	Stéphane Houdet (FRA)
April 4	Florida Open (United States) Boca Raton, United States; ITF Super Series, Hard	Men's doubles	Steve Baldwin (USA); Adam Kellerman (AUS)
April 4	Florida Open (United States) Boca Raton, United States; ITF Super Series, Hard	Women's singles	Esther Vergeer (NED)
April 4	Florida Open (United States) Boca Raton, United States; ITF Super Series, Hard	Women's doubles	Marjolein Buis (NED); Esther Vergeer (NED)
April 4	Florida Open (United States) Boca Raton, United States; ITF Super Series, Hard	Quad Singles	David Wagner (USA)
April 4	Florida Open (United States) Boca Raton, United States; ITF Super Series, Hard	Quad Doubles	Andrew Lapthorne (GBR); Peter Norfolk (GBR)
April 21	South African Open (South Africa) Johannesburg, South Africa; ITF 1 Series, Hard	Men's singles	Marc McCarroll (GBR)
April 21	South African Open (South Africa) Johannesburg, South Africa; ITF 1 Series, Hard	Men's doubles	Marc McCarroll (GBR); Gordon Reid (GBR)
April 21	South African Open (South Africa) Johannesburg, South Africa; ITF 1 Series, Hard	Women's singles	Sabine Ellerbrock (GER)
April 21	South African Open (South Africa) Johannesburg, South Africa; ITF 1 Series, Hard	Women's doubles	Marjolein Buis (NED); Sabine Ellerbrock (GER)
April 21	South African Open (South Africa) Johannesburg, South Africa; ITF 1 Series, Hard	Quad Singles	Andrew Lapthorne (GBR)
April 21	South African Open (South Africa) Johannesburg, South Africa; ITF 1 Series, Hard	Quad Doubles	Boaz Kramer (ISR); Shraqa Weinberg (ISR)

=== May ===
Date	Tournament	Event	Champions
May 8	Atlanta Open (United States) Atlanta, United States; ITF 1 Series, Hard	Men's singles	Maikel Scheffers (NED)
May 8	Atlanta Open (United States) Atlanta, United States; ITF 1 Series, Hard	Men's doubles	Marc McCarroll (GBR); Maikel Scheffers (NED)
May 8	Atlanta Open (United States) Atlanta, United States; ITF 1 Series, Hard	Women's singles	Jiske Griffioen (NED)
May 8	Atlanta Open (United States) Atlanta, United States; ITF 1 Series, Hard	Women's doubles	Lucy Shuker (GBR); Jordanne Whiley (GBR)
May 8	Atlanta Open (United States) Atlanta, United States; ITF 1 Series, Hard	Quad Singles	David Wagner (USA)
May 8	Atlanta Open (United States) Atlanta, United States; ITF 1 Series, Hard	Quad Doubles	Nicholas Taylor (USA); David Wagner (USA)
May 14	Japan Open; Fukuoka, Japan; ITF Super Series, Hard	Men's singles	Gustavo Fernandez (ARG)
May 14	Japan Open; Fukuoka, Japan; ITF Super Series, Hard	Men's doubles	Sam-Ju Kim (KOR); Ji-Hwan Lee (KOR)
May 14	Japan Open; Fukuoka, Japan; ITF Super Series, Hard	Women's singles	Sabine Ellerbrock (GER)
May 14	Japan Open; Fukuoka, Japan; ITF Super Series, Hard	Women's doubles	Faizatul Abdullah Thani (MAS); Choosri Inthanin (THA)
May 14	Japan Open; Fukuoka, Japan; ITF Super Series, Hard	Quad Singles	David Wagner (USA)
May 14	Japan Open; Fukuoka, Japan; ITF Super Series, Hard	Quad Doubles	Jamie Burdekin (GBR); Peter Norfolk (GBR)
May 29	Korea Open (South Korea) Seoul, South Korea; ITF 1 Series, Hard	Men's singles	Gustavo Fernandez (ARG)
May 29	Korea Open (South Korea) Seoul, South Korea; ITF 1 Series, Hard	Men's doubles	Seung-Jin Kim (KOR); Dong-Ju Kwak (KOR)
May 29	Korea Open (South Korea) Seoul, South Korea; ITF 1 Series, Hard	Women's singles	Aniek van Koot (NED)
May 29	Korea Open (South Korea) Seoul, South Korea; ITF 1 Series, Hard	Women's doubles	Lucy Shuker (GBR); Jordanne Whiley (GBR)
May 29	Korea Open (South Korea) Seoul, South Korea; ITF 1 Series, Hard	Quad Singles	Lucas Sithole (RSA)
May 29	Korea Open (South Korea) Seoul, South Korea; ITF 1 Series, Hard	Quad Doubles	Jamie Burdekin (GBR); Anders Hard (SWE)

=== June ===
Date	Tournament	Event	Champions
June 5	Daegu Open (South Korea) Daegu, South Korea; ITF 1 Series, Hard	Men's singles	Gustavo Fernandez (ARG)
June 5	Daegu Open (South Korea) Daegu, South Korea; ITF 1 Series, Hard	Men's doubles	Chiol Young An (KOR); Sung-Mo Lee (KOR)
June 5	Daegu Open (South Korea) Daegu, South Korea; ITF 1 Series, Hard	Women's singles	Lucy Shuker (GBR)
June 5	Daegu Open (South Korea) Daegu, South Korea; ITF 1 Series, Hard	Women's doubles	Katharina Krüger (GER); Lucy Shuker (GBR)
June 5	Daegu Open (South Korea) Daegu, South Korea; ITF 1 Series, Hard	Quad Singles	Anders Hard (SWE)
June 5	Daegu Open (South Korea) Daegu, South Korea; ITF 1 Series, Hard	Quad Doubles	Anders Hard (SWE); Lucas Sithole (RSA)
June 6	French Open (France) Paris, France; Grand Slam, Clay	Men's singles	Stéphane Houdet (FRA)
June 6	French Open (France) Paris, France; Grand Slam, Clay	Men's doubles	Frédéric Cattanéo (FRA); Shingo Kunieda (JPN)
June 6	French Open (France) Paris, France; Grand Slam, Clay	Women's singles	Esther Vergeer (NED)
June 6	French Open (France) Paris, France; Grand Slam, Clay	Women's doubles	Esther Vergeer (NED); Marjolein Buis (NED)
June 26	BNP Paribas French Open (France) Paris, France; ITF Super Series, Hard	Men's singles	Shingo Kunieda (JPN)
June 26	BNP Paribas French Open (France) Paris, France; ITF Super Series, Hard	Men's doubles	Stéphane Houdet (FRA); Michaël Jérémiasz (FRA)
June 26	BNP Paribas French Open (France) Paris, France; ITF Super Series, Hard	Women's singles	Aniek van Koot (NED)
June 26	BNP Paribas French Open (France) Paris, France; ITF Super Series, Hard	Women's doubles	Jiske Griffioen (NED); Aniek van Koot (NED)
June 26	BNP Paribas French Open (France) Paris, France; ITF Super Series, Hard	Quad Singles	Noam Gershony (ISR)
June 26	BNP Paribas French Open (France) Paris, France; ITF Super Series, Hard	Quad Doubles	Andrew Lapthorne (GBR); Peter Norfolk (GBR)

=== July ===
Date	Tournament	Event	Champions
July 6	Wimbledon Championships (United Kingdom) London, Great Britain; Grand Slam, Grass	Men's doubles	Tom Egberink (NED); Michaël Jérémiasz (FRA)
July 6	Wimbledon Championships (United Kingdom) London, Great Britain; Grand Slam, Grass	Women's doubles	Jiske Griffioen (NED); Aniek van Koot (NED)
July 10	Swiss Open (Switzerland) Geneva, Switzerland; ITF 1 Series, Hard	Men's singles	Shingo Kunieda (JPN)
July 10	Swiss Open (Switzerland) Geneva, Switzerland; ITF 1 Series, Hard	Men's doubles	Gordon Reid (GBR); Maikel Scheffers (NED)
July 10	Swiss Open (Switzerland) Geneva, Switzerland; ITF 1 Series, Hard	Women's singles	Esther Vergeer (NED)
July 10	Swiss Open (Switzerland) Geneva, Switzerland; ITF 1 Series, Hard	Women's doubles	Maaike Smit (NED); Esther Vergeer (NED)
July 10	Swiss Open (Switzerland) Geneva, Switzerland; ITF 1 Series, Hard	Quad Singles	David Wagner (USA)
July 10	Swiss Open (Switzerland) Geneva, Switzerland; ITF 1 Series, Hard	Quad Doubles	Bryan Barten (USA); David Wagner (USA)
July 17	British Open (United Kingdom) Nottingham, Great Britain; ITF Super Series, Hard	Men's singles	Shingo Kunieda (JPN)
July 17	British Open (United Kingdom) Nottingham, Great Britain; ITF Super Series, Hard	Men's doubles	Stéphane Houdet (FRA); Michaël Jérémiasz (FRA)
July 17	British Open (United Kingdom) Nottingham, Great Britain; ITF Super Series, Hard	Women's singles	Esther Vergeer (NED)
July 17	British Open (United Kingdom) Nottingham, Great Britain; ITF Super Series, Hard	Women's doubles	Jiske Griffioen (NED); Aniek van Koot (NED)
July 17	British Open (United Kingdom) Nottingham, Great Britain; ITF Super Series, Hard	Quad Singles	Noam Gershony (ISR)
July 17	British Open (United Kingdom) Nottingham, Great Britain; ITF Super Series, Hard	Quad Doubles	Noam Gershony (ISR); Shraga Weinberg (ISR)
July 24	Belgian Open (Belgium) Jambes, Belgium; ITF 1 Series, Hard	Men's singles	Ronald Vink (NED)
July 24	Belgian Open (Belgium) Jambes, Belgium; ITF 1 Series, Hard	Men's doubles	Robin Ammerlaan (NED); Ronald Vink (NED)
July 24	Belgian Open (Belgium) Jambes, Belgium; ITF 1 Series, Hard	Women's singles	Sabine Ellerbrock (GER)
July 24	Belgian Open (Belgium) Jambes, Belgium; ITF 1 Series, Hard	Women's doubles	Annick Sevenans (BEL); Lucy Shuker (GBR)
July 24	Belgian Open (Belgium) Jambes, Belgium; ITF 1 Series, Hard	Quad Singles	David Wagner (USA)
July 24	Belgian Open (Belgium) Jambes, Belgium; ITF 1 Series, Hard	Quad Doubles	Bryan Barten (USA); David Wagner (USA)

=== August ===
Date	Tournament	Event	Champions
August 1	Salzburg Open (Austria) Salzburg, Austria; ITF 1 Series, Hard	Men's singles	Joachim Gérard (BEL)
August 1	Salzburg Open (Austria) Salzburg, Austria; ITF 1 Series, Hard	Men's doubles	Antonio Cippo (ITA); Luciano Grande (ITA)
August 1	Salzburg Open (Austria) Salzburg, Austria; ITF 1 Series, Hard	Women's singles	Daniela Di Toro (AUS)
August 1	Salzburg Open (Austria) Salzburg, Austria; ITF 1 Series, Hard	Women's doubles	Sabine Ellerbrock (GER); Katharina Krüger (GER)
August 1	Salzburg Open (Austria) Salzburg, Austria; ITF 1 Series, Hard	Quad Singles	Lucas Sithole (RSA)
August 1	Salzburg Open (Austria) Salzburg, Austria; ITF 1 Series, Hard	Quad Doubles	Giuseppe Polidori (ITA); Antonio Raffaele (ITA)

=== September ===
Date	Tournament	Event	Champions
September 1	2012 Summer Paralympics (United Kingdom) London, Great Britain; ITF Super Series, Hard	Men's singles	Shingo Kunieda (JPN)
September 1	2012 Summer Paralympics (United Kingdom) London, Great Britain; ITF Super Series, Hard	Men's doubles	Stefan Olsson (SWE); Peter Vikstrom (SWE)
September 1	2012 Summer Paralympics (United Kingdom) London, Great Britain; ITF Super Series, Hard	Women's singles	Esther Vergeer (NED)
September 1	2012 Summer Paralympics (United Kingdom) London, Great Britain; ITF Super Series, Hard	Women's doubles	Marjolein Buis (NED); Esther Vergeer (NED)
September 1	2012 Summer Paralympics (United Kingdom) London, Great Britain; ITF Super Series, Hard	Quad Singles	Noam Gershony (ISR)
September 1	2012 Summer Paralympics (United Kingdom) London, Great Britain; ITF Super Series, Hard	Quad Doubles	Nicholas Taylor (USA); David Wagner (USA)
September 25	Sardinia Open (Italy) Localita Maria Pia, Italy; ITF 1 Series, Hard	Men's singles	Joachim Gérard (BEL)
September 25	Sardinia Open (Italy) Localita Maria Pia, Italy; ITF 1 Series, Hard	Men's doubles	Joachim Gérard (BEL); Martin Legner (AUT)
September 25	Sardinia Open (Italy) Localita Maria Pia, Italy; ITF 1 Series, Hard	Women's singles	Sabine Ellerbrock (GER)
September 25	Sardinia Open (Italy) Localita Maria Pia, Italy; ITF 1 Series, Hard	Women's doubles	Sabine Ellerbrock (GER); Sharon Walraven (NED)
September 25	Sardinia Open (Italy) Localita Maria Pia, Italy; ITF 1 Series, Hard	Quad Singles	Sarah Hunter (CAN)
September 25	Sardinia Open (Italy) Localita Maria Pia, Italy; ITF 1 Series, Hard	Quad Doubles	Christer Jansson (SWE); Antonio Raffaele (ITA)

=== October ===
Date	Tournament	Event	Champions
October 2	USTA Wheelchair Tennis Championships (United States) St. Louis, United States; ITF Super Series, Hard	Men's singles	Stéphane Houdet (FRA)
October 2	USTA Wheelchair Tennis Championships (United States) St. Louis, United States; ITF Super Series, Hard	Men's doubles	Stéphane Houdet (FRA); Gordon Reid (GBR)
October 2	USTA Wheelchair Tennis Championships (United States) St. Louis, United States; ITF Super Series, Hard	Women's singles	Sabine Ellerbrock (GER)
October 2	USTA Wheelchair Tennis Championships (United States) St. Louis, United States; ITF Super Series, Hard	Women's doubles	Sabine Ellerbrock (GER); Sharon Walraven (NED)
October 2	USTA Wheelchair Tennis Championships (United States) St. Louis, United States; ITF Super Series, Hard	Quad Singles	David Wagner (USA)
October 2	USTA Wheelchair Tennis Championships (United States) St. Louis, United States; ITF Super Series, Hard	Quad Doubles	Nick Taylor (USA); David Wagner (USA)

=== November ===
Date	Tournament	Event	Champions
November 7	NEC Singles Masters (Belgium) Sint-Katelijne-Waver, Belgium; ITF Masters Series, Hard	Men's singles	Shingo Kunieda (JPN)
November 7	NEC Singles Masters (Belgium) Sint-Katelijne-Waver, Belgium; ITF Masters Series, Hard	Women's singles	Jiske Griffioen (NED)
November 7	NEC Singles Masters (Belgium) Sint-Katelijne-Waver, Belgium; ITF Masters Series, Hard	Quad Singles	David Wagner (USA)
November 14	Invacare Doubles Masters (Netherlands) Netherlands; ITF Masters Series, Hard	Men's doubles	Stéphane Houdet (FRA); Shingo Kunieda (JPN)
November 14	Invacare Doubles Masters (Netherlands) Netherlands; ITF Masters Series, Hard	Women's doubles	Jiske Griffioen (NED); Aniek van Koot (NED)
November 14	Invacare Doubles Masters (Netherlands) Netherlands; ITF Masters Series, Hard	Quad Doubles	Nick Taylor (USA); David Wagner (USA)
