= List of quad wheelchair tennis champions =

This is a list of the wheelchair tennis champions at the Grand Slam and the Wheelchair Tennis Masters events in the quad division since its introduction to the Wheelchair Tennis Tour in 1998. Champions from the quad wheelchair tennis events at the Paralympic Games are also included.

== Champions by year ==
Legend
bold outline	Player won the Grand Slam (four major tournaments in the same year).

=== Wheelchair quad singles ===
Year	Grand Slam				Masters	Paralympics
Year	AO	FO	Wim	USO	Masters	Paralympics
2004	not held	not held	not held	not held	David Wagner	Peter Norfolk
2005	not held	not held	not held	not held	David Wagner	not held
2006	not held	not held	not held	not held	Peter Norfolk	not held
2007	not held	not held	not held	Peter Norfolk	David Wagner	not held
2008	Peter Norfolk	not held	not held	not held	David Wagner	Peter Norfolk
2009	Peter Norfolk	not held	not held	Peter Norfolk	Peter Norfolk	not held
2010	Peter Norfolk	not held	not held	David Wagner	Peter Norfolk	not held
2011	David Wagner	not held	not held	David Wagner	Noam Gershony	not held
2012	Peter Norfolk	not held	not held	not held	David Wagner	Noam Gershony
2013	David Wagner	not held	not held	Lucas Sithole	David Wagner	not held
2014	David Wagner	not held	not held	Andy Lapthorne	David Wagner	not held
2015	Dylan Alcott	not held	not held	Dylan Alcott	David Wagner	not held
2016	Dylan Alcott	not held	not held	not held	David Wagner	Dylan Alcott
2017	Dylan Alcott	not held	not held	David Wagner	David Wagner	not held
2018	Dylan Alcott	not held	not held	Dylan Alcott	Dylan Alcott	not held
2019	Dylan Alcott	Dylan Alcott	Dylan Alcott	Andy Lapthorne	David Wagner	not held
2020	Dylan Alcott	Dylan Alcott	cancelled	Sam Schröder	cancelled	Rescheduled
2021	Dylan Alcott	Dylan Alcott	Dylan Alcott	Dylan Alcott	Niels Vink	Dylan Alcott
2022	Sam Schröder	Niels Vink	Sam Schröder	Niels Vink	Sam Schröder	not held
2023	Sam Schröder	Niels Vink	Niels Vink	Sam Schröder	Niels Vink	not held
2024	Sam Schröder	Guy Sasson	Niels Vink	not held	Niels Vink	Niels Vink
2025	Sam Schröder	Guy Sasson	Niels Vink	Niels Vink	Sam Schröder	not held
2026	Niels Vink	Niels Vink	Niels Vink	Niels Vink		not held

=== Wheelchair quad doubles ===
Year	Grand Slam				Masters	Paralympics
Year	AO	FO	Wim	USO	Masters	Paralympics
2003	not held	not held	not held	not held	Sarah Hunter; Peter Norfolk	not held
2004	not held	not held	not held	not held	Sarah Hunter; Peter Norfolk	Nick Taylor; David Wagner
2005	not held	not held	not held	not held	Nick Taylor; David Wagner	not held
2006	not held	not held	not held	not held	Nick Taylor; David Wagner	not held
2007	not held	not held	not held	Nick Taylor; David Wagner	Nick Taylor; David Wagner	not held
2008	Nick Taylor; David Wagner	not held	not held	not held	Johan Andersson; Bas van Erp	Nick Taylor; David Wagner
2009	Nick Taylor; David Wagner	not held	not held	Nick Taylor; David Wagner	Nick Taylor; David Wagner	not held
2010	Nick Taylor; David Wagner	not held	not held	Nick Taylor; David Wagner	Andy Lapthorne; Peter Norfolk	not held
2011	Andy Lapthorne; Peter Norfolk	not held	not held	Nick Taylor; David Wagner	Nick Taylor; David Wagner	not held
2012	Andy Lapthorne; Peter Norfolk	not held	not held	not held	Nick Taylor; David Wagner	Nick Taylor; David Wagner
2013	Nick Taylor; David Wagner	not held	not held	Nick Taylor; David Wagner	Nick Taylor; David Wagner	not held
2014	Andy Lapthorne; David Wagner	not held	not held	Nick Taylor; David Wagner	Nick Taylor; David Wagner	not held
2015	Andy Lapthorne; David Wagner	not held	not held	Nick Taylor; David Wagner	Nick Taylor; David Wagner	not held
2016	Lucas Sithole; David Wagner	not held	not held	not held	Antony Cotterill; Andy Lapthorne	Dylan Alcott; Heath Davidson
2017	Andy Lapthorne; David Wagner	not held	not held	Andy Lapthorne; David Wagner	Nick Taylor; David Wagner	not held
2018	Dylan Alcott; Heath Davidson	not held	Exhibition match	Andy Lapthorne; David Wagner	Nick Taylor; David Wagner	not held
2019	Dylan Alcott; Heath Davidson	Dylan Alcott; David Wagner	Dylan Alcott; Andy Lapthorne	Dylan Alcott; Andy Lapthorne	Heath Davidson; Niels Vink	not held
2020	Dylan Alcott; Heath Davidson	Sam Schröder; David Wagner	cancelled	Dylan Alcott; Andy Lapthorne	cancelled	Rescheduled
2021	Dylan Alcott; Heath Davidson	Andy Lapthorne; David Wagner	Andy Lapthorne; David Wagner	Sam Schröder; Niels Vink	Sam Schröder; Niels Vink	Sam Schröder; Niels Vink
2022	Andy Lapthorne; David Wagner	Sam Schröder; Niels Vink	Sam Schröder; Niels Vink	Sam Schröder; Niels Vink	Sam Schröder; Niels Vink	not held
2023	Sam Schröder; Niels Vink	Andy Lapthorne; Donald Ramphadi	Sam Schröder; Niels Vink	Sam Schröder; Niels Vink	Sam Schröder; Niels Vink	not held
2024	Andy Lapthorne; David Wagner	Sam Schröder; Niels Vink	Sam Schröder; Niels Vink	not held	Sam Schröder; Niels Vink	Sam Schröder; Niels Vink
2025	Andy Lapthorne; Sam Schröder	Guy Sasson; Niels Vink	Guy Sasson; Niels Vink	Guy Sasson; Niels Vink	Guy Sasson; Niels Vink	not held
2026	Guy Sasson; Niels Vink	Guy Sasson; Niels Vink	Guy Sasson; Niels Vink	Sam Schröder; Jin Woodman		not held

== Champions list ==
=== Wheelchair quad singles ===
Rank	Player	Grand Slam					Masters	Paralympics	Total
Rank	Player	Australian Open	French Open	Wimbledon	US Open	Total	Masters	Paralympics	Total
1	Dylan Alcott	7	3	2	3	15	1	2	18
2	David Wagner	3	0	0	3	6	11	0	17
3	Niels Vink	1	3	4	3	11	3	1	15
4	Peter Norfolk	4	0	0	2	6	3	2	11
5	Sam Schröder	4	0	1	2	7	2	0	9
6	Noam Gershony	0	0	0	0	0	1	1	2
6	Andy Lapthorne	0	0	0	2	2	0	0	2
6	Guy Sasson	0	2	0	0	2	0	0	2
9	Lucas Sithole	0	0	0	1	1	0	0	1

=== Wheelchair quad doubles ===
Rank	Player	Grand Slam					Masters	Paralympics	Total
Rank	Player	Australian Open	French Open	Wimbledon	US Open	Total	Masters	Paralympics	Total
1	David Wagner	10	3	1	9	23	11	3	37
2	Nick Taylor	4	0	0	7	11	11	3	25
3	Niels Vink	2	4	5	4	15	6	2	23
4	Andy Lapthorne	8	2	2	4	16	2	0	18
4	Sam Schröder	2	3	3	4	12	4	2	18
6	Dylan Alcott	4	1	1	2	8	0	1	9
7	Guy Sasson	1	2	2	1	6	1	0	7
8	Heath Davidson	4	0	0	0	4	1	1	6
9	Peter Norfolk	2	0	0	0	2	3	0	5
10	Sarah Hunter	0	0	0	0	0	2	0	2
11	Johan Andersson	0	0	0	0	0	1	0	1
11	Bas van Erp	0	0	0	0	0	1	0	1
11	Lucas Sithole	1	0	0	0	1	0	0	1
11	Antony Cotterill	0	0	0	0	0	1	0	1
11	Donald Ramphadi	0	1	0	0	1	0	0	1
11	Jin Woodman	0	0	0	1	1	0	0	1

== Grand Slam achievements ==
=== Grand Slam ===
Players who held all four major titles simultaneously (in a calendar year).

==== Wheelchair quad singles ====
Player	Australian Open	French Open	Wimbledon	US Open
Dylan Alcott	2021	2021	2021	2021
Niels Vink	2026	2026	2026	2026

==== Wheelchair quad doubles ====
Player	Australian Open	French Open	Wimbledon	US Open
Dylan Alcott	2019	2019	2019	2019

=== Non-calendar year Grand Slam ===
Players who held all four major titles simultaneously (not in a calendar year).

==== Wheelchair quad singles ====
Player	From	To	Streak	Notes
Dylan Alcott	2018 Australian Open	2019 Wimbledon	5	

==== Wheelchair quad doubles ====
Player	From	To	Streak	Notes
Sam Schröder	2022 French Open	2023 Australian Open	4	
Niels Vink	2022 French Open	2023 Australian Open	4	
Guy Sasson	2025 French Open	2026 Wimbledon	6	
Niels Vink (2)	2025 French Open	2026 Wimbledon	6	

=== Career Grand Slam ===
Players who won all four major titles over the course of their careers.

- The event at which the Career Grand Slam was completed indicated in **bold**

==== Wheelchair quad singles ====
Player	Australian Open	French Open	Wimbledon	US Open
Dylan Alcott	2015	2019	**2019**	2015
Dylan Alcott (2)	2016	2020	**2021**	2018
Niels Vink	**2026**	2022	2023	2022

==== Wheelchair quad doubles ====
===== Individual =====
Player	Australian Open	French Open	Wimbledon	US Open
Dylan Alcott	2018	2019	2019	**2019**
Andy Lapthorne	2011	**2021**	2019	2017
David Wagner	2008	2019	**2021**	2007
Sam Schröder	**2023**	2020	2022	2021
Niels Vink	**2023**	2022	2022	2021
Andy Lapthorne (2)	2012	**2023**	2021	2018
Sam Schröder (2)	**2025**	2022	2023	2022
Niels Vink (2)	**2026**	2024	2023	2022
Guy Sasson	**2026**	2025	2025	2025

===== Team =====
Player	Australian Open	French Open	Wimbledon	US Open
Andy Lapthorne; David Wagner	2014	2021	**2021**	2017
Sam Schröder; Niels Vink	**2023**	2022	2022	2021
Guy Sasson; Niels Vink (2)	**2026**	2025	2025	2025

=== Golden Slam ===
Players who won all four Grand Slam titles and the Paralympic gold medal simultaneously (in a calendar year).

==== Wheelchair quad singles ====
Player	Australian Open	French Open	Wimbledon	US Open	Paralympics
Dylan Alcott	2021	2021	2021	2021	2021

=== Career Golden Slam ===
Players who won all four Grand Slam titles and the Paralympic gold medal over the course of their careers.

- The event at which the Career Golden Slam was completed indicated in **bold**

==== Wheelchair quad singles ====
Player	Australian Open	French Open	Wimbledon	US Open	Paralympics
Dylan Alcott	2015	2019	**2019**	2015	2016
Dylan Alcott (2)	2016	2020	2021	2018	**2021**
Niels Vink	**2026**	2022	2023	2022	2024

==== Wheelchair quad doubles ====
===== Individual =====
Player	Australian Open	French Open	Wimbledon	US Open	Paralympics
Dylan Alcott	2018	2019	2019	**2019**	2016
David Wagner	2008	2019	**2021**	2007	2004
Sam Schröder	**2023**	2020	2022	2021	2021
Niels Vink	**2023**	2022	2022	2021	2021
Sam Schröder (2)	**2025**	2022	2023	2022	2024
Niels Vink (2)	**2026**	2024	2023	2022	2024

===== Team =====
Player	Australian Open	French Open	Wimbledon	US Open	Paralympics
Sam Schröder; Niels Vink	**2023**	2022	2022	2021	2021

=== Career Super Slam ===
Players who won all four Grand Slam titles, the Olympic gold medal and the year-end championship over the course of their careers.

- The event at which the Career Super Slam was completed indicated in **bold**

==== Wheelchair quad singles ====
Player	Australian Open	French Open	Wimbledon	US Open	Paralympics	Year-end
Dylan Alcott	2015	2019	**2019**	2015	2016	2018
Niels Vink	**2026**	2022	2023	2022	2024	2021

==== Wheelchair quad doubles ====
===== Individual =====
Player	Australian Open	French Open	Wimbledon	US Open	Paralympics	Year-end
David Wagner	2008	2019	**2021**	2007	2004	2005
Sam Schröder	**2023**	2020	2022	2021	2021	2021
Niels Vink	**2023**	2022	2022	2021	2021	2019
Sam Schröder (2)	**2025**	2022	2023	2022	2024	2022
Niels Vink (2)	**2026**	2024	2023	2022	2024	2021

===== Team =====
Player	Australian Open	French Open	Wimbledon	US Open	Paralympics	Year-end
Sam Schröder; Niels Vink	**2023**	2022	2022	2021	2021	2021

== Multiple titles in a season ==
=== Three titles in a single season ===
Note: players who won 4 titles in a season are not included here.

Key
**W**	F	SF	QF	#R	RR	Q#	DNQ	A	NH

(W) winner; (F) finalist; (SF) semifinalist; (QF) quarterfinalist; (#R) rounds 4, 3, 2, 1; (RR) round-robin stage; (Q#) qualification round; (DNQ) did not qualify; (A) absent; (NH) not held; (SR) strike rate (events won / competed); (W–L) win–loss record.

==== Wheelchair quad singles ====
Player	Year	Australian Open	French Open	Wimbledon	US Open
Dylan Alcott	2019	**W**	**W**	**W**	F

==== Wheelchair quad doubles ====
Player	Year	Australian Open	French Open	Wimbledon	US Open
Niels Vink	2022	F	**W**	W	**W**
Sam Schröder	2022	F	**W**	W	**W**
Niels Vink (2)	2023	**W**	SF	W	**W**
Sam Schröder (2)	2023	**W**	SF	W	**W**
Guy Sasson	2025	F	**W**	W	**W**
Niels Vink (3)	2025	F	**W**	W	**W**
Guy Sasson (2)	2026	**W**	**W**	W	F
Niels Vink (4)	2026	**W**	**W**	W	F

=== Surface Slam ===
Players who won Grand Slam titles on clay, grass and hard courts in a calendar year.

==== Wheelchair quad singles ====
Player	Year	Clay court slam	Hard court slam	Grass court slam
Dylan Alcott	2019	French Open	Australian Open	Wimbledon
Dylan Alcott (2)	2021	French Open	Australian Open	Wimbledon
Dylan Alcott (2)	2021	French Open	US Open	Wimbledon
Niels Vink	2026	French Open	Australian Open	Wimbledon

==== Wheelchair quad doubles ====
Player	Year	Clay court slam	Hard court slam	Grass court slam
Dylan Alcott	2019	French Open	Australian Open	Wimbledon
Dylan Alcott	2019	French Open	US Open	Wimbledon
Sam Schröder	2022	French Open	US Open	Wimbledon
Niels Vink	2022	French Open	US Open	Wimbledon
Guy Sasson	2025	French Open	US Open	Wimbledon
Niels Vink (2)	2025	French Open	US Open	Wimbledon
Guy Sasson (2)	2026	French Open	Australian Open	Wimbledon
Niels Vink (3)	2026	French Open	Australian Open	Wimbledon

=== Career Surface Slam ===
Players who won Grand Slam titles on clay, grass and hard courts iover the course of their careers.

- The event at which the Career Surface Slam was completed indicated in **bold**

==== Wheelchair quad singles ====
Player	Clay court slam	Hard court slam	Grass court slam
Dylan Alcott	2019 French Open	2015 Australian Open	**2019 Wimbledon**
Dylan Alcott (2)	2020 French Open	2015 US Open	**2021 Wimbledon**
Niels Vink	2022 French Open	2022 US Open	**2023 Wimbledon**
Niels Vink (2)	2023 French Open	**2025 US Open**	2024 Wimbledon
Niels Vink (3)	**2026 French Open**	2026 Australian Open	2025 Wimbledon

==== Wheelchair men's doubles ====
===== Individual =====
Player	Clay court slam	Hard court slam	Grass court slam
Dylan Alcott	2019 French Open	2018 Australian Open	**2019 Wimbledon**
Andy Lapthorne	**2021 French Open**	2011 Australian Open	2019 Wimbledon
David Wagner	2019 French Open	2007 US Open	**2021 Wimbledon**
Sam Schröder	2020 French Open	2021 US Open	**2022 Wimbledon**
Niels Vink	2022 French Open	2021 US Open	**2022 Wimbledon**
Andy Lapthorne (2)	**2023 French Open**	2012 Australian Open	2021 Wimbledon
Sam Schröder (2)	2022 French Open	2022 US Open	**2023 Wimbledon**
Niels Vink (2)	**2024 French Open**	2022 US Open	2023 Wimbledon
Sam Schröder (3)	2024 French Open	2023 Australian Open	**2024 Wimbledon**
Niels Vink (3)	**2025 French Open**	2023 Australian Open	2024 Wimbledon
Guy Sasson	2025 French Open	**2025 US Open**	2025 Wimbledon
Niels Vink (4)	**2026 French Open**	2023 US Open	2025 Wimbledon
Guy Sasson (2)	2026 French Open	2026 Australian Open	**2026 Wimbledon**

===== Team =====
Player	Clay court slam	Hard court slam	Grass court slam
Andy Lapthorne; David Wagner	2008 French Open	2014 Australian Open	**2013 Wimbledon**
Sam Schröder; Niels Vink	2022 French Open	2021 US Open	**2022 Wimbledon**
Sam Schröder; Niels Vink (2)	2024 French Open	2022 US Open	2023 Wimbledon
Guy Sasson; Niels Vink	2025 French Open	**2025 US Open**	2025 Wimbledon
Guy Sasson; Niels Vink (2)	2026 French Open	2026 Australian Open	**2026 Wimbledon**

=== Channel Slam ===
Players who won the French Open-Wimbledon double.

==== Wheelchair quad singles ====
Year	Player
2019	Dylan Alcott
2021	Dylan Alcott (2)
2023	Niels Vink
2026	Niels Vink (2)

==== Wheelchair quad doubles ====
Year	Player
2019	Dylan Alcott
2021	Andy Lapthorne
2021	David Wagner
2022	Sam Schröder
2022	Niels Vink
2024	Sam Schröder (2)
2024	Niels Vink (2)
2025	Guy Sasson
2025	Niels Vink (3)
2026	Guy Sasson (2)
2026	Niels Vink (4)

== See also ==
- List of men's wheelchair tennis champions
- List of women's wheelchair tennis champions
