= Wheelchair tennis at the 2012 Summer Paralympics – Quad singles =

Wheelchair tennis – Quad singles at the XIV Paralympic Games
- Paralympic wheelchair tennis
- Venue: Eton Manor, London
- Dates: 2–8 September 2012
- Competitors: 16 from 7 nations

Medalists
1st place, gold medalist(s)		Noam Gershony	Israel
2nd place, silver medalist(s)		David Wagner	United States
3rd place, bronze medalist(s)		Nicholas Taylor	United States

Quad singles
- Wheelchair tennis at the 2012 Summer Paralympics

Events
Singles	men	women	quad
Doubles	men	women	quad
← 2008 ·	Summer Paralympics	· 2016 →

The quad singles event at the 2012 Paralympic Games took place from 2 to 8 September, at Eton Manor, London.

== Calendar ==
September	2	3	4	5	6	7	8
Round	Round of 16	None	Quarterfinals	None	Semifinals	Bronze	Final

== Seeds ==
1. David Wagner (USA) (silver medalist)
2. Noam Gershony (ISR) (gold medalist)
3. Peter Norfolk (GBR) (quarterfinals)
4. Andrew Lapthorne (GBR) (round of 16)

== Draw ==
=== Key ===
- INV = Bipartite invitation
- ITF = ITF place
- ALT = Alternate
- r = Retired
- w/o = Walkover

First round
1	D Wagner (USA)	6	7
L Sithole (RSA)	2	5
G Polidori (ITA)	3	2
B Kramer (ISR)	6	6
4	A Lapthorne (GBR)	7	3	3
A Hard (SWE)	5	6	6
N Taylor (USA)	6	7
S Kawano (JPN)	1	5
S Weinberg (ISR)	6	6
M Jonsson (SWE)	1	2
M Moroishi (JPN)	0	0
3	P Norfolk (GBR)	6	6
M Innocenti (ITA)	3	4
B Barten (USA)	6	6
J Burdekin (GBR)	6	3	3
2	N Gershony (ISR)	3	6	6

Quarter-finals
1	D Wagner (USA)	6	6
B Kramer (ISR)	3	0
A Hard (SWE)	6	4	1
N Taylor (USA)	4	6	6
S Weinberg (ISR)	3	7	6
3	P Norfolk (GBR)	6	5	0
B Barten (USA)	1	1
2	N Gershony (ISR)	6	6

Semi-finals
1	D Wagner (USA)	6	6
N Taylor (USA)	2	1
S Weinberg (ISR)	0	0
2	N Gershony (ISR)	6	6

Final (gold-medal match)
1	D Wagner (USA)	3	1
2	N Gershony (ISR)	6	6
Bronze-medal match
N Taylor (USA)	1	6	6
S Weinberg (ISR)	6	3	4
