= Wheelchair tennis at the 2008 Summer Paralympics – Quad singles =

Wheelchair tennis – Quad singles at the XIII Paralympic Games
- Paralympic wheelchair tennis
- Venue: Olympic Green Tennis Centre
- Dates: 8–15 September 2008

Medalists
1st place, gold medalist(s)		Peter Norfolk	Great Britain
2nd place, silver medalist(s)		Johan Andersson	Sweden
3rd place, bronze medalist(s)		David Wagner	United States

Quad singles
- Wheelchair tennis at the 2008 Summer Paralympics

Events
Singles	men	women	quad
Doubles	men	women	quad
← 2004 ·	Summer Paralympics	· 2012 →

The quad singles wheelchair tennis competition at the 2008 Summer Paralympics in Beijing was held from 9 September to 14 September at the Olympic Green Tennis Centre. The DecoTurf surface rendered the event a hardcourt competition.

== Medalists ==
Gold	Peter Norfolk; Great Britain
Silver	Johan Andersson; Sweden
Bronze	David Wagner; United States

== Calendar ==
September	9	10	11	12	13	14
Round	Round of 16	Quarterfinals	None	Semifinals	Bronze	Final

== Seeds ==
1. David Wagner (USA) (semifinals, bronze medalist)
2. Peter Norfolk (GBR) (champion, gold medalist)
3. Nick Taylor (USA) (semifinals, fourth place)
4. Johan Andersson (SWE) (final, silver medalist)

== Draw ==
=== Key ===
- INV = Bipartite invitation
- IP = ITF place
- ALT = Alternate
- r = Retired
- w/o = Walkover

=== Finals ===
Semifinals
1	David Wagner (USA)	4	6	3
4	Johan Andersson (SWE)	6	2	6
3	Nick Taylor (USA)	0	3
2	Peter Norfolk (GBR)	6	6

Final (gold medal match)
4	Johan Andersson (SWE)	2	2
2	Peter Norfolk (GBR)	6	6
Bronze medal match
1	David Wagner (USA)	6	4	6
3	Nick Taylor (USA)	2	6	1

==== Top half ====
Round of 16
1	D Wagner (USA)	6	4	6
S Hunter (CAN)	3	6	4
INV	J Burdekin (GBR)	2	4
S Weinberg (ISR)	6	6
4	J Andersson (SWE)	6	7
B Poppen (USA)	2	6
D Timmermans-van Hall (NED)	6	3	6
G Polidori (ITA)	1	6	3

Quarterfinals
1	D Wagner (USA)	6	6
S Weinberg (ISR)	2	2
4	J Andersson (SWE)	6	6
D Timmermans-van Hall (NED)	3	1

Semifinals
1	D Wagner (USA)	4	6	3
4	J Andersson (SWE)	6	2	6

==== Bottom half ====
Round of 16
B van Erp (NED)	6	6
A Raffaele (ITA)	1	1
INV	B Kramer (ISR)	3	3
3	N Taylor (USA)	6	6
INV	C Jansson (SWE)	0	7	3
S Kimura (JPN)	6	6	6
M de Beer (NED)	1	1
2	P Norfolk (GBR)	6	6

Quarterfinals
B van Erp (NED)	6	5	6
3	N Taylor (USA)	1	7	7
S Kimura (JPN)	0	1
2	P Norfolk (GBR)	6	6

Semifinals
3	N Taylor (USA)	0	3
2	P Norfolk (GBR)	6	6
