= Wheelchair tennis at the 2004 Summer Paralympics – Quad singles =

Wheelchair tennis – Quad singles at the XII Paralympic Games
- Paralympic wheelchair tennis
- Venue: Athens Olympic Tennis Centre
- Dates: 19–26 September 2004

Medalists
1st place, gold medalist(s)		Peter Norfolk	Great Britain
2nd place, silver medalist(s)		David Wagner	United States
3rd place, bronze medalist(s)		Bas van Erp	Netherlands

Quad singles
- Wheelchair tennis at the 2004 Summer Paralympics

Events
Singles	men	women	quad
Doubles	men	women	quad
← 2000 ·	Summer Paralympics	· 2008 →

The quad singles wheelchair tennis competition at the 2004 Summer Paralympics in Athens was held from 19 September to 26 September at the Athens Olympic Tennis Centre.

== Draw ==
=== Key ===
- INV = Bipartite invitation
- IP = ITF place
- ALT = Alternate
- r = Retired
- w/o = Walkover

=== Finals ===
Semifinals
Peter Norfolk (GBR)	6	6
Bas van Erp (NED)	2	3
Nick Taylor (USA)	6	5
David Wagner (USA)	7	7

Final (gold medal match)
Peter Norfolk (GBR)	6	6
David Wagner (USA)	3	2
Bronze medal match
Bas van Erp (NED)	6	7
Nick Taylor (USA)	4	6

==== Top half ====
Round of 16
P Norfolk (GBR)	6	6
K Whalen (USA)	1	2
H Toma (JPN)	1	2
S Hunter (CAN)	6	6
M Eccleston (GBR)	3	6	6
G Polidori (ITA)	6	3	2
P Araya (CHI)	1	0
B van Erp (NED)	6	6

Quarterfinals
P Norfolk (GBR)	6	7
S Hunter (CAN)	3	4
M Eccleston (GBR)	1	6	5
B van Erp (NED)	6	3	7

Semifinals
P Norfolk (GBR)	6	6
B van Erp (NED)	2	3

==== Bottom half ====
Round of 16
N Taylor (USA)	6	6
R Humphreys (GBR)	2	1
M de Beer (NED)	6	6
B McPhate (CAN)	1	2
S Weinberg (ISR)	6	6
M Takashima (JPN)	2	3
A Raffaele (ITA)	2	1
D Wagner (USA)	6	6

Quarterfinals
N Taylor (USA)	6	6
M de Beer (NED)	2	2
S Weinberg (ISR)	5	7	3
D Wagner (USA)	7	5	6

Semifinals
N Taylor (USA)	6	5
D Wagner (USA)	7	7
