= Wheelchair tennis at the 2008 Summer Paralympics =

- Date: 8–15 September 2008
- Edition: 5th
- Location: Olympic Green Tennis Centre, Beijing

Champions

Men's singles
- Shingo Kunieda (JPN)

Women's singles
- Esther Vergeer (NED)

Men's doubles
- Stéphane Houdet (FRA) & Michaël Jeremiasz (FRA)

Women's doubles
- Korie Homan (NED) & Sharon Walraven (NED)

Quad singles
- Peter Norfolk (GBR)

Quad doubles
- Nick Taylor (USA) & David Wagener (USA)
← 2004 ·	Summer Paralympics	· 2012 →

Wheelchair tennis at the 2008 Summer Paralympics was held at the Olympic Green Tennis Centre from 8 September to 15 September.

== Classification ==
Players were given a classification depending on the type and extent of their disability. The classification system allowed players to compete against others with a similar level of function. To compete in wheelchair tennis, athletes had to have a major or total loss of function in one or both legs. Quadriplegic players competed in the mixed events, while players with full use of their arms competed in the separate men's and women's events.

== Events ==
Six events were contested:

- Men's singles
- Men's doubles
- Women's singles
- Women's doubles
- Quad singles (mixed gender)
- Quad doubles (mixed gender)

== Participating countries ==
There were 112 athletes (77 male, 35 female) from 35 nations taking part in this sport.

- Argentina (1)
- Australia (3)
- Austria (3)
- Belgium (2)
- Brazil (2)
- Canada (4)
- Chile (2)
- China (4)
- Colombia (2)
- Denmark (1)
- Finland (1)
- France (6)
- Germany (1)
- Great Britain (8)
- Greece (1)
- Hungary (2)
- Indonesia (1)
- Israel (3)
- Italy (6)
- Japan (9)
- Netherlands (11)
- Nigeria (1)
- Poland (4)
- Romania (1)
- Russia (1)
- Slovakia (3)
- South Africa (2)
- South Korea (4)
- Spain (3)
- Sri Lanka (1)
- Sweden (4)
- Switzerland (3)
- Thailand (2)
- Turkey (1)
- United States (9)

== Medal summary ==
=== Medal table ===
This ranking sorts countries by the number of gold medals earned by their players (in this context a country is an entity represented by a National Paralympic Committee). The number of silver medals is taken into consideration next and then the number of bronze medals. If, after the above, countries are still tied, equal ranking is given and they are listed alphabetically.

Rank	Nation	Gold	Silver	Bronze	Total
1	Netherlands (NED)	2	3	1	6
2	France (FRA)	1	0	2	3
3	Great Britain (GBR)	1	0	1	2
3	Japan (JPN)	1	0	1	2
3	United States (USA)	1	0	1	2
6	Sweden (SWE)	0	2	0	2
7	Israel (ISR)	0	1	0	1
Totals (7 entries)		6	6	6	18

=== Medalists ===
Event	Gold	Silver	Bronze
Men's singles	Shingo Kunieda; Japan	Robin Ammerlaan; Netherlands	Maikel Scheffers; Netherlands
Men's doubles	France (FRA); Stéphane Houdet; Michaël Jérémiasz	Sweden (SWE); Stefan Olsson; Peter Vikström	Japan (JPN); Shingo Kunieda; Satoshi Saida
Women's singles	Esther Vergeer; Netherlands	Korie Homan; Netherlands	Florence Gravellier; France
Women's doubles	Netherlands (NED); Korie Homan; Sharon Walraven	Netherlands (NED); Jiske Griffioen; Esther Vergeer	France (FRA); Florence Gravellier; Arlette Racineux
Quad singles	Peter Norfolk; Great Britain	Johan Andersson; Sweden	David Wagner; United States
Quad doubles	United States (USA); Nick Taylor; David Wagner	Israel (ISR); Boaz Kramer; Shraga Weinberg	Great Britain (GBR); Jamie Burdekin; Peter Norfolk

Source: Paralympic.org
