= Wheelchair tennis at the 2008 Summer Paralympics – Quad doubles =

Wheelchair tennis – Quad doubles at the XIII Paralympic Games
- Paralympic wheelchair tennis
- Venue: Olympic Green Tennis Centre
- Dates: 8–15 September 2008

Medalists
1st place, gold medalist(s)		Nick Taylor; David Wagner	United States
2nd place, silver medalist(s)		Boaz Kramer; Shraga Weinberg	Israel
3rd place, bronze medalist(s)		Jamie Burdekin; Peter Norfolk	Great Britain

Quad doubles
- Wheelchair tennis at the 2008 Summer Paralympics

Events
Singles	men	women	quad
Doubles	men	women	quad
← 2004 ·	Summer Paralympics	· 2012 →

The quad doubles wheelchair tennis competition at the 2008 Summer Paralympics in Beijing was held from 10 September to 13 September at the Olympic Green Tennis Centre. The DecoTurf surface rendered the event a hardcourt competition.

== Medalists ==
Gold	Nick Taylor / David Wagner; United States
Silver	Boaz Kramer / Shraga Weinberg; Israel
Bronze	Jamie Burdekin / Peter Norfolk; Great Britain

== Calendar ==
September	10	11	12	13
Round	Quarterfinals	Semifinals	None	Bronze & final

== Seeds ==
1. Nick Taylor / David Wagner (USA) (champions, gold medalists)
2. Jamie Burdekin / Peter Norfolk (GBR) (semifinals, bronze medalists)

== Draw ==
=== Key ===
- INV = Bipartite invitation
- IP = ITF place
- ALT = Alternate
- r = Retired
- w/o = Walkover

=== Finals ===
Quarterfinals
1	Nick Taylor (USA); David Wagner (USA)
BYE
Giuseppe Polidori (ITA); Antonio Raffaele (ITA)	0	2
Dorrie Timmermans-van Hall (NED); Bas van Erp (NED)	6	6
Boaz Kramer (ISR); Shraga Weinberg (ISR)	6	6
Johan Andersson (SWE); Christer Jansson (SWE)	2	4
BYE
2	Jamie Burdekin (GBR); Peter Norfolk (GBR)

Semifinals
1	Nick Taylor (USA); David Wagner (USA)	6	6
Dorrie Timmermans-van Hall (NED); Bas van Erp (NED)	3	4
Boaz Kramer (ISR); Shraga Weinberg (ISR)	6	6
2	Jamie Burdekin (GBR); Peter Norfolk (GBR)	4	4

Final (gold medal match)
1	Nick Taylor (USA); David Wagner (USA)	6	4	6
Boaz Kramer (ISR); Shraga Weinberg (ISR)	0	6	2
Bronze medal match
2	Jamie Burdekin (GBR); Peter Norfolk (GBR)	6	7	6
Dorrie Timmermans-van Hall (NED); Bas van Erp (NED)	7	5	1
