= China National Tennis Center =

Tennis venue in Beijing, China

China National Tennis Center 国家网球中心
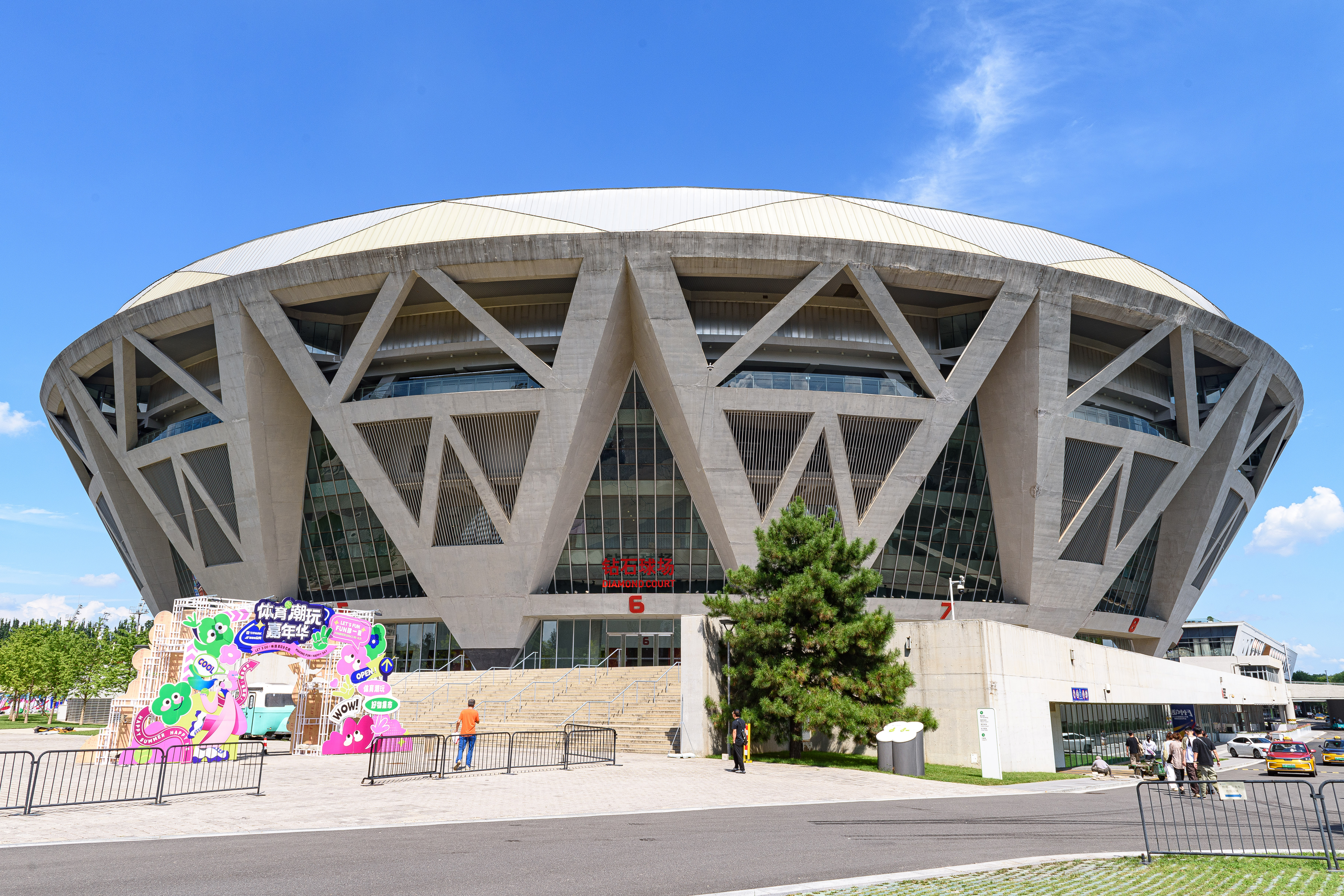
- The Diamond Court in 2024
- Interactive map of China National Tennis Center 国家网球中心
- Former names: Olympic Green Tennis Center; Beijing Olympic Green Tennis Court
- Location: Chaoyang, Beijing, China
- Coordinates: 40°01′08.88″N 116°22′24.44″E
- Owner: Beijing Shiao Forest Park Development & Management Limited
- Operator: Beijing Shiao Forest Park Development & Management Limited
- Capacity: Individual court capacities: 15,000 (Diamond Court); 10,000 (Lotus Court); 4,000 (Moon Court); 2,000 (Brad Drewett Court / Court 1); 200 (Court 2–8 / Court 3–9); (Previous courts name are currently used)
- Surface: Hard, outdoors
- Public transit: Lincuiqiao Station

Construction
- Groundbreaking: 2003
- Opened: 1 October 2007
- Expanded: 2011

Tenant
- China Open (2009–present)

The China National Tennis Center (Chinese: 国家网球中心; pinyin: Guójiā Wǎngqiú Zhōngxīn) is a tennis center in the Olympic Green in Chaoyang, Beijing, China. It was opened in October 2007 and has been the home of the China Open since 2009.

The venue hosted the tennis preliminaries and finals of singles and doubles for men and women at the Beijing 2008 Olympics and Paralympics.

== General information ==
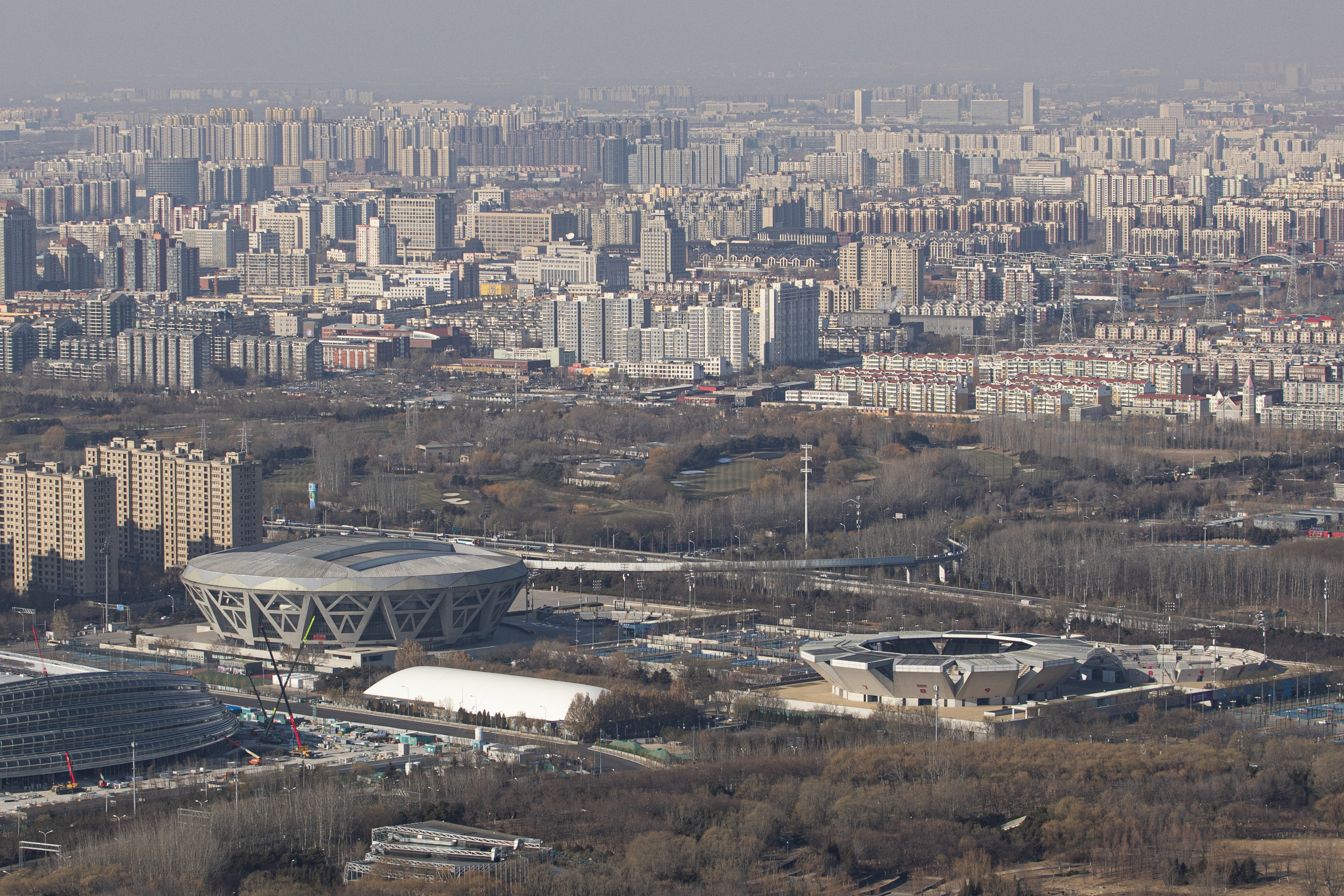
Aerial view of the center in 2019

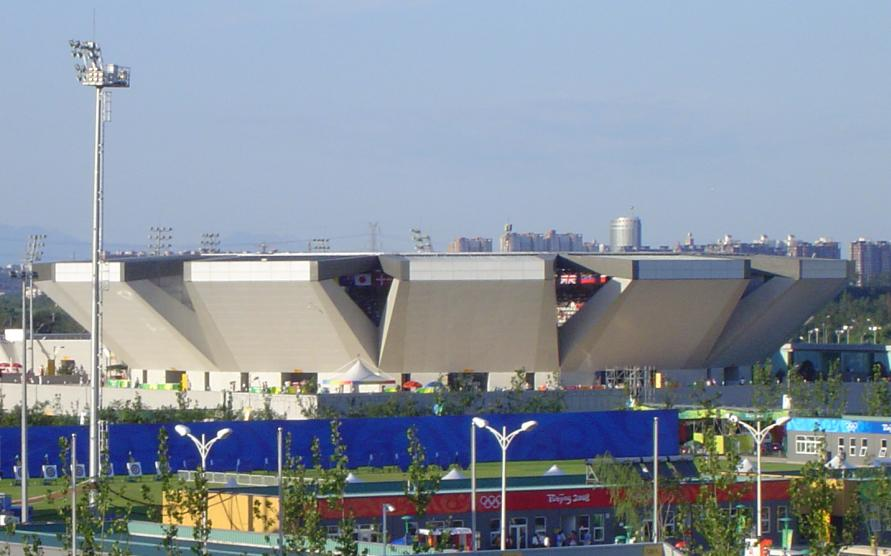
Lotus Court during the 2008 Summer Olympics

The center is located in Beijing, just 1.7 miles (2.7 km) from the National Stadium (a.k.a. The Bird's Nest).

The tennis center covers an area of 41.22 acres (166,800 m^{2}) with a floor space of 285,394 sq ft (26,514.0 m^{2}). The center currently has 12 competition hard courts and 35 training courts, including 20 hard courts, 10 indoor hard courts, 2 artificial grass courts, 2 indoor clay courts, and a mini hard court.

The main court, named Diamond Court (nicknamed National Tennis Stadium), has a capacity of 15,000. The Lotus Court (10,000 capacity), Moon Court, and Brad Drewett Court all have 12 stands, which represent petals of lotus flowers, one of the emblems of the 2008 Summer Olympics. Lotus Court has a capacity of 10,000. Moon Court has a capacity of 4,000 and Brad Drewett Court has a capacity of 2,000. The courts have been specially designed for natural air ventilation to reduce the amount of air pollution entering the courts, ensuring optimal health for both athletes and spectators. It also allows the courts to be cooled and with an installation of cooling machines, the courts' temperatures can easily be reduced to five degrees Celsius. Curtains attached to the roofs of the courts also allows them to be cooled in the heat of the sun.

The project embodies the concepts of Green Olympics, Hi-Tech Olympics, and People's Olympics. It integrates design experience of world sport architecture and will be a tennis competition venue of the state of the art design in keeping with international standards.

In 2009 the China Open, which is an ATP World Tour 500 series event and a WTA Premier Mandatory tournament, moved its location to this center from its former location, the Beijing Tennis Center.

== Rename ==
The National Tennis Center was opened on 1 October 2007. It was named The Olympic Green Tennis Center (北京奥林匹克公园网球中心) after the Beijing 2008 Olympics. Since it started to host the China Open, the venue was renamed to China National Tennis Center (国家网球中心) in 2009.

== Timeline ==
=== Before the Olympics ===
All courts except for the National Tennis Stadium were opened on 1 October 2007 and were tested between 6 and 20 October 2007 in the Good Luck Beijing 2007 ITF Pro Circuit, where 36 men and 44 women competed.

=== During the Olympics ===
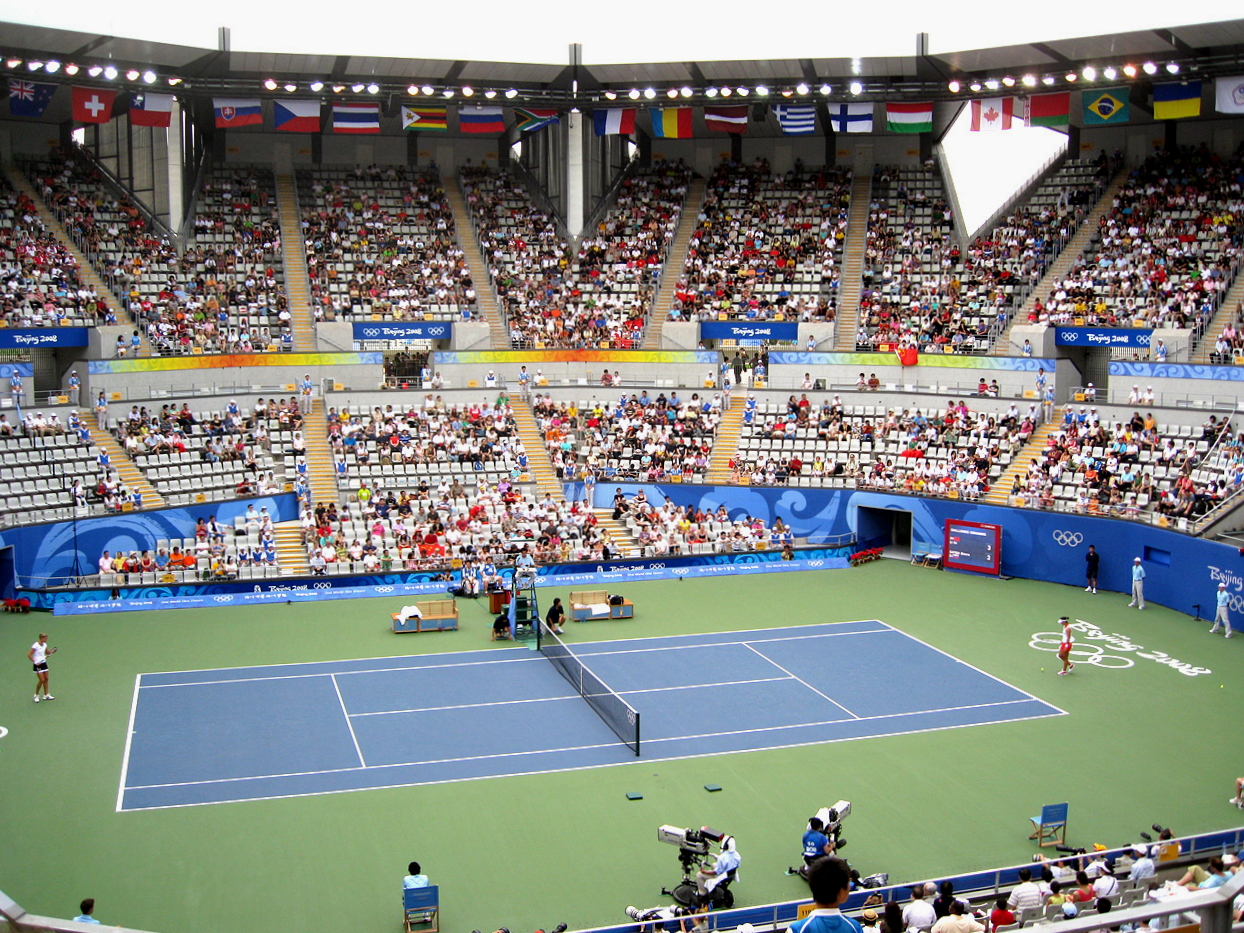
Olympic Green Tennis Center during the 2008 Summer Olympics

The Courts hosted the 2008 Summer Olympics in Beijing. The following competitions were played:

- men's singles – 64-player draw
- women's singles – 64-player draw
- men's doubles – 32-player draw
- women's doubles – 32-player draw

==== The winners ====
Event	Gold	Silver	Bronze
Men's singles	Rafael Nadal; Spain	Fernando González; Chile	Novak Djokovic; Serbia
Men's doubles	Switzerland; Roger Federer; Stanislas Wawrinka	Sweden; Simon Aspelin; Thomas Johansson	United States; Bob Bryan; Mike Bryan
Women's singles	Elena Dementieva; Russia	Dinara Safina; Russia	Vera Zvonareva; Russia
Women's doubles	United States; Serena Williams; Venus Williams	Spain; Anabel Medina Garrigues; Virginia Ruano Pascual	China; Yan Zi; Zheng Jie

=== During the Paralympics ===
The Courts also hosted the wheelchair tennis competitions of the 2008 Summer Paralympics in Beijing. These were played between 8 and 15 September 2008.

112 athletes (approximately 64-80 male and 32~48 female) were classified into disability group.

The competitions played included:

- men's singles
- women's singles
- men's doubles
- women's doubles
- quads singles
- quads doubles

==== The winners ====
Event	Gold	Silver	Bronze
Men's singles	Shingo Kunieda; Japan	Robin Ammerlaan; Netherlands	Maikel Scheffers; Netherlands
Men's doubles	France (FRA); Stéphane Houdet; Michaël Jeremiasz	Sweden (SWE); Stefan Olsson; Peter Wikstrom	Japan (JPN); Shingo Kunieda; Satoshi Saida
Women's singles	Esther Vergeer; Netherlands	Korie Homan; Netherlands	Florence Gravellier; France
Women's doubles	Netherlands (NED); Korie Homan; Sharon Walraven	Netherlands (NED); Jiske Griffioen; Esther Vergeer	France (FRA); Florence Gravellier; Arlette Racineux
Quad singles	Peter Norfolk; Great Britain	Johan Andersson; Sweden	David Wagner; United States
Quad doubles	United States (USA); Nick Taylor; David Wagner	Israel (ISR); Boaz Kramer; Shraga Weinberg	Great Britain (GBR); Jamie Burdekin; Peter Norfolk

== After the Olympics/Paralympics ==
After the Beijing Olympic and Paralympic games of 2008, the center remained standing. It did not host the 2008 China Open Tennis tournament, despite rumours it would. However, it became the new home of the China Open from 2009 onwards. A new center court, National Tennis Stadium, was completed in 2011. Featuring a retractable roof, this new court possesses a capacity of 15,000 spectators, making it the world's fifth largest tennis stadium by capacity. Lincuiqiao Station on Beijing Subway Line 8 opened in the same year, providing the closest public transport access to the tennis center.

== See also ==
- Tennis in China
- List of tennis stadiums by capacity
