= Wheelchair tennis at the 2008 Summer Paralympics – Women's singles =

Wheelchair tennis – Women's singles at the XIII Paralympic Games
- Paralympic wheelchair tennis
- Venue: Olympic Green Tennis Centre
- Dates: 8–14 September 2008
- Competitors: 32

Medalists
1st place, gold medalist(s)		Esther Vergeer	Netherlands
2nd place, silver medalist(s)		Korie Homan	Netherlands
3rd place, bronze medalist(s)		Florence Gravellier	France

Women's singles
- Wheelchair tennis at the 2008 Summer Paralympics

Events
Singles	men	women	quad
Doubles	men	women	quad
← 2004 ·	Summer Paralympics	· 2012 →

The women's singles wheelchair tennis competition at the 2008 Summer Paralympics in Beijing was held from 8 September to 14 September at the Olympic Green Tennis Centre. The DecoTurf surface rendered the event a hardcourt competition.

== Calendar ==
September	8	9	10	11	12	13	14
Round	Round of 32	None	Round of 16	Quarterfinals	Semifinals	Bronze	Final

== Seeds ==
1. Esther Vergeer (NED) (champion, gold medalist)
2. Korie Homan (NED) (final, silver medalist)
3. Sharon Walraven (NED) (quarterfinals)
4. Jiske Griffioen (NED) (semifinals, fourth place)
5. Florence Gravellier (FRA) (semifinals, bronze medalist)
6. Annick Sevenans (BEL) (second round)
7. Ilanit Fridman (ISR) (second round)
8. Mie Yaosa (JPN) (first round)

== Draw ==
=== Key ===
- INV = bipartite invitation
- IP = ITF place
- ALT = alternate
- r = retired
- w/o = walkover

=== Finals ===
Semifinals
1	Esther Vergeer (NED)	6	6
4	Jiske Griffioen (NED)	0	1
5	Florence Gravellier (FRA)	4	2
2	Korie Homan (NED)	6	6

Final (gold medal match)
1	Esther Vergeer (NED)	6	4	7
2	Korie Homan (NED)	2	6	6
Bronze medal match
4	Jiske Griffioen (NED)	3	4
5	Florence Gravellier (FRA)	6	6

==== Top half ====
Round of 32
1	E Vergeer (NED)	6	6
D di Toro (AUS)	2	0
K Krüger (GER)	7	6	6
A Bartczak (POL)	6	7	3
INV	A Racineux (FRA)	6	6
INV	J Whiley (GBR)	2	4
Dong F (CHN)	6	6
8	M Yaosa (JPN)	4	4
4	J Griffioen (NED)	6	6
Y Okabe (JPN)	2	4
INV	S de Maria (ITA)	2	2
Hwang MH (KOR)	6	6
INV	Y Ida (INA)	0	0
B Arnoult (USA)	6	6
INV	J Martínez (COL)	0	0
6	A Sevenans (BEL)	6	6

Round of 16
1	E Vergeer (NED)	6	6
K Krüger (GER)	1	0
INV	A Racineux (FRA)	0	2
Dong F (CHN)	6	6
4	J Griffioen (NED)	6	6
Hwang MH (KOR)	1	0
B Arnoult (USA)	1	6	6
6	A Sevenans (BEL)	6	3	4

Quarterfinals
1	E Vergeer (NED)	6	6
Dong F (CHN)	2	0
4	J Griffioen (NED)	6	6
B Arnoult (USA)	3	0

Semifinals
1	E Vergeer (NED)	6	6
4	J Griffioen (NED)	0	1

==== Bottom half ====
Round of 32
5	F Gravellier (FRA)	6	6
INV	CS Tugui (ROU)	0	0
K Domori (JPN)	1	3
L Shuker (GBR)	6	6
INV	K Montjane (RSA)	4	0
K Verfuerth (USA)	6	6
MD Ochoa (ESP)	2	1
3	S Walraven (NED)	6	6
7	I Fridman (ISR)	6	6
C Ohmae (JPN)	4	0
M Lauro (ITA)	2	4
INV	Hu D (CHN)	6	6
Hong YS (KOR)	6	6
K Suter-Erath (SUI)	1	1
Y Chokyu (CAN)	1	2
2	K Homan (NED)	6	6

Round of 16
5	F Gravellier (FRA)	2	6	6
L Shuker (GBR)	6	1	4
K Verfuerth (USA)	1	5
3	S Walraven (NED)	6	7
7	I Fridman (ISR)	1	6	4
INV	Hu D (CHN)	6	3	6
Hong YS (KOR)	0	1
2	K Homan (NED)	6	6

Quarterfinals
5	F Gravellier (FRA)	6	6
3	S Walraven (NED)	1	4
INV	Hu D (CHN)	1	1
2	K Homan (NED)	6	6

Semifinals
5	F Gravellier (FRA)	4	2
2	K Homan (NED)	6	6
