= Wheelchair tennis at the 2004 Summer Paralympics – Quad doubles =

Wheelchair tennis – Quad doubles at the XII Paralympic Games
- Paralympic wheelchair tennis
- Venue: Athens Olympic Tennis Centre
- Dates: 19–26 September 2004

Medalists
1st place, gold medalist(s)		Nick Taylor; David Wagner	United States
2nd place, silver medalist(s)		Mark Eccleston; Peter Norfolk	Great Britain
3rd place, bronze medalist(s)		Monique de Beer; Bas van Erp	Netherlands

Quad doubles
- Wheelchair tennis at the 2004 Summer Paralympics

Events
Singles	men	women	quad
Doubles	men	women	quad
← 2000 ·	Summer Paralympics	· 2008 →

The quad doubles wheelchair tennis competition at the 2004 Summer Paralympics in Athens was held from 19 September to 26 September at the Athens Olympic Tennis Centre.

== Draw ==
=== Key ===
- INV = Bipartite invitation
- IP = ITF place
- ALT = Alternate
- r = Retired
- w/o = Walkover

=== Finals ===
Quarterfinals
Nick Taylor (USA); David Wagner (USA)
BYE
Masao Takashima (JPN); Hiroshi Toma (JPN)	3	0
Sarah Hunter (CAN); Brian McPhate (CAN)	6	6
Antonio Raffaele (ITA); Giuseppe Polidori (ITA)	3	1
Monique de Beer (NED); Bas van Erp (NED)	6	6
BYE
Marc Eccleston (GBR); Peter Norfolk (GBR)

Semifinals
Nick Taylor (USA); David Wagner (USA)	6	6
Sarah Hunter (CAN); Brian McPhate (CAN)	0	3
Monique de Beer (NED); Bas van Erp (NED)	6	5	1
Mark Eccleston (GBR); Peter Norfolk (GBR)	2	7	6

Final (gold medal match)
Nick Taylor (USA); David Wagner (USA)	6	6
Mark Eccleston (GBR); Peter Norfolk (GBR)	4	1
Bronze medal match
Sarah Hunter (CAN); Brian McPhate (CAN)	3	1
Monique de Beer (NED); Bas van Erp (NED)	6	6
