= Wheelchair tennis at the 2008 Summer Paralympics – Women's doubles =

Wheelchair tennis – Women's doubles at the XIII Paralympic Games
- Paralympic wheelchair tennis
- Venue: Olympic Green Tennis Centre
- Dates: 8–15 September 2008

Medalists
1st place, gold medalist(s)		Korie Homan; Sharon Walraven	Netherlands
2nd place, silver medalist(s)		Jiske Griffioen; Esther Vergeer	Netherlands
3rd place, bronze medalist(s)		Florence Gravellier; Arlette Racineux	France

Women's doubles
- Wheelchair tennis at the 2008 Summer Paralympics

Events
Singles	men	women	quad
Doubles	men	women	quad
← 2004 ·	Summer Paralympics	· 2012 →

The women's doubles wheelchair tennis competition at the 2008 Summer Paralympics in Beijing was held from 10 September to 15 September at the Olympic Green Tennis Centre. The DecoTurf surface rendered the event a hardcourt competition. This was the only Paralympic tournament in either singles or doubles at which Esther Vergeer lost a match.

== Medalists ==
Gold	Korie Homan/Sharon Walraven; Netherlands
Silver	Jiske Griffioen/Esther Vergeer; Netherlands
Bronze	Florence Gravellier/Arlette Racineux; France

== Calendar ==
September	10	11	12	13	14	15
Round	Round of 16	Quarterfinals	None	Semifinals	Bronze	Final

== Seeds ==
1. Jiske Griffioen / Esther Vergeer (NED) (final, silver medalists)
2. Korie Homan / Sharon Walraven (NED) (champions, gold medalists)
3. Florence Gravellier / Arlette Racineux (FRA) (semifinals, bronze medalists)
4. Beth Arnoult / Kaitlyn Verfuerth (USA) (semifinals, fourth place)

== Draw ==
=== Key ===
- INV = bipartite invitation
- IP = ITF place
- ALT = alternate
- r = retired
- w/o = walkover

=== Finals ===
Semifinals
1	Jiske Griffioen (NED); Esther Vergeer (NED)	6	6
4	Beth Arnoult (USA); Kaitlyn Verfuerth (USA)	2	1
3	Florence Gravellier (FRA); Arlette Racineux (FRA)	4	3
2	Korie Homan (NED); Sharon Walraven (NED)	6	6

Final (gold medal match)
1	Jiske Griffioen (NED); Esther Vergeer (NED)	6	6	4
2	Korie Homan (NED); Sharon Walraven (NED)	2	7	6
Bronze medal match
4	Beth Arnoult (USA); Kaitlyn Verfuerth (USA)	7	3	2
3	Florence Gravellier (FRA); Arlette Racineux (FRA)	5	6	6

==== Top half ====
Round of 16			Quarterfinals					Semifinals
			1	Jiske Griffioen (NED); Esther Vergeer (NED)	6	6
Silvia di Maria (ITA); Marianna Lauro (ITA)	4	0		Yuko Okabe (JPN); Mie Yaosa (JPN)	1	2
Yuko Okabe (JPN); Mie Yaosa (JPN)	6	6						1	Jiske Griffioen (NED); Esther Vergeer (NED)	6	6
								4	Beth Arnoult (USA); Kaitlyn Verfuerth (USA)	2	1
			4	Beth Arnoult (USA); Kaitlyn Verfuerth (USA)	5	7	6
				Lucy Shuker (GBR); Jordanne Whiley (GBR)	7	5	2

==== Bottom half ====
Round of 16			Quarterfinals				Semifinals
				Kanako Domori (JPN); Chiyoko Ohmae (JPN)	4	5
			3	Florence Gravellier (FRA); Arlette Racineux (FRA)	6	7
							3	Florence Gravellier (FRA); Arlette Racineux (FRA)	4	3
Dong Fuli (CHN); Hu Dandan (CHN)	6	6					2	Korie Homan (NED); Sharon Walraven (NED)	6	6
Young-Suk Hong (KOR); Myung-Hee Hwang (KOR)	1	3		Dong Fuli (CHN); Hu Dandan (CHN)	0	2
			2	Korie Homan (NED); Sharon Walraven (NED)	6	6
