= Israel at the 2008 Summer Paralympics =

- IPC code: ISR
- NPC: Israel Paralympic Committee
- Website: www.isad.org.il

in Beijing
- Competitors: 42 in 11 sports
- Flag bearer: Yizhar Cohen
- Officials: 15
- Medals Ranked 53rd: Gold 0 Silver 5 Bronze 1 Total 6

Summer Paralympics appearances (overview)
- 1960; 1964; 1968; 1972; 1976; 1980; 1984; 1988; 1992; 1996; 2000; 2004; 2008; 2012; 2016; 2020; 2024

Israel sent a delegation to compete at the 2008 Summer Paralympics in Beijing. Israel sent 42 athletes, who competed in 11 sports: archery, athletics, basketball, cycling, equestrian, rowing, sailing, shooting, swimming, table tennis and tennis. The country's flagbearer during the Games' opening ceremony was Yizhar Cohen, who won three gold medals at the 1988 Seoul Paralympics.

== Medalists ==
Medal	Name	Sport	Event	Date
Silver; Silver; Silver	Inbal Pezaro	Swimming	Women's 100m Freestyle – S5; Women's 200m Freestyle – S5; Women's 100m Breaststroke – SB4	7th 9th 12th
Silver	Doron Shaziri	Shooting	Men's R7–50m Free Rifle 3x40 – SH1	10th
Silver	Boaz Kramer; Shraga Weinberg	Tennis	Mixed Quad Doubles	13th
Bronze	Eli Nawi	Rowing	Men's Single Sculls – A	11th

Medals by date
Day	Date	Gold medal	Silver medal	Bronze medal	Total
Day 1	7th	0	1	0	1
Day 2	8th	0	0	0	0
Day 3	9th	0	1	0	1
Day 4	10th	0	1	0	1
Day 5	11th	0	0	1	1
Day 6	12th	0	1	0	1
Day 7	13th	0	1	0	1
Day 8	14th	0	0	0	0
Day 9	15th	0	0	0	0
Day 10	16th	0	0	0	0
Day 11	17th	0	0	0	0
Total		0	5	1	6

== Archery ==
Israel's squad included 1 athlete.

Athlete	Event	Ranking round		Round of 32	Round of 16	Quarterfinals	Semifinals	Finals	
Athlete	Event	Score	Rank	Opposition Result	Opposition Result	Opposition Result	Opposition Result	Opposition Result	Rank
Amit Dror	Men's Individual Recurve – W1/W2	557	23	Stone (USA); L 88–92	did not advance				

== Athletics ==
Israel's squad included 1 athlete.

Athlete	Events	Final	
Athlete	Events	Time	Rank
Beza Nebeva	Men's Marathon – T12	3:21:07	23

== Basketball ==
Men

Squad list	Group stage		Quarterfinal	Rank 5-8	Rank 5-6	Semifinal	Final	Rank
Squad list	Opposition Result	Rank	Opposition Result	Opposition Result	Opposition Result	Opposition Result	Opposition Result	Rank
Allon Dor-On; David Drai; Lior Dror; Ron Furman; Shay Haim; Liran Hendel; Avraham Lehrman; Dotan Meishar; Ariel Ottolenghi; Rotem Philipps (C); Roei Rosenberg; Eyal Sar-Tov	United States; L 53–76	4 Q	Canada; L 47–55	Iran; W 20–0	Germany; L 54–63	did not advance		6
Allon Dor-On; David Drai; Lior Dror; Ron Furman; Shay Haim; Liran Hendel; Avraham Lehrman; Dotan Meishar; Ariel Ottolenghi; Rotem Philipps (C); Roei Rosenberg; Eyal Sar-Tov	China; W 80–41	4 Q	Canada; L 47–55	Iran; W 20–0	Germany; L 54–63	did not advance		6
Allon Dor-On; David Drai; Lior Dror; Ron Furman; Shay Haim; Liran Hendel; Avraham Lehrman; Dotan Meishar; Ariel Ottolenghi; Rotem Philipps (C); Roei Rosenberg; Eyal Sar-Tov	Brazil; W 73–60	4 Q	Canada; L 47–55	Iran; W 20–0	Germany; L 54–63	did not advance		6
Allon Dor-On; David Drai; Lior Dror; Ron Furman; Shay Haim; Liran Hendel; Avraham Lehrman; Dotan Meishar; Ariel Ottolenghi; Rotem Philipps (C); Roei Rosenberg; Eyal Sar-Tov	Australia; L 59–66	4 Q	Canada; L 47–55	Iran; W 20–0	Germany; L 54–63	did not advance		6
Allon Dor-On; David Drai; Lior Dror; Ron Furman; Shay Haim; Liran Hendel; Avraham Lehrman; Dotan Meishar; Ariel Ottolenghi; Rotem Philipps (C); Roei Rosenberg; Eyal Sar-Tov	Great Britain; L 67–82	4 Q	Canada; L 47–55	Iran; W 20–0	Germany; L 54–63	did not advance		6

Pool B

Team	Pts	Pld	W	D	L	PF	PA	PD
Australia	9	5	4	0	1	346	291	55
United States	9	5	4	0	1	388	247	141
Great Britain	9	5	4	0	1	334	271	63
Israel	7	5	2	0	3	332	325	7
Brazil	6	5	1	0	4	291	358	-67
China	5	5	0	0	5	203	402	-199

Qualified for quarterfinals

== Cycling ==
Israel's squad included 1 athlete.

Athlete	Event	Time	Rank
Nati Gruber	Men's Individual Road Race – HC C	did not participate after he was injured in a road accident	
Nati Gruber	Men's Individual Time Trial – HC C	did not participate after he was injured in a road accident	

== Equestrian ==
Equestrian in the Paralympic Games is Dressage only.

Athlete	Horse	Event	Score	Rank
Omer Ben-Dor	Lennox	Ind. Championship Test – Grade Ib	63.048	9
Omer Ben-Dor	Lennox	Ind. Freestyle Test – Grade Ib	61.501	13

== Rowing ==
Athlete(s)	Event	Heats		Repechage		Final B		Final	
Athlete(s)	Event	Time	Rank	Time	Rank	Time	Rank (Overall)	Time	Rank
Pascale Bercovitch	Women's Single Sculls – A	6:12.32	4 R	7:06.20	4	7:02.43	2 (8)	did not advance	
Eli Nawi	Men's Single Sculls – A	5:25.06	2 R	5:49.30	2 Q	N/A		5:26.03	Bronze medal
Mari Kogan; Igor Kogan	Mixed Double Sculls – TA	4:43.53	5 R	5:03.38	4	4:50.43	4 (10)	did not advance	
Anastasia Dobrovolski; Shir Kalmanovitz; Reuven Magnagey; Andrew Zuhbaia; Cox: Genady Sapoznikov	Mixed Coxed Four – LTA	3:58.75	6 R	4:13.39	5	4:15.43	6 (12)	did not advance	

- WB : World's best time
- Q : qualified for final
- R : qualified for repechage

== Sailing ==
Athlete(s)	Event	Race											Score	Rank
Athlete(s)	Event	1	2	3	4	5	6	7	8	9	10	11	Score	Rank
Dror Cohen; Arnon Efrati; Benny Vexler	Sonar – Three-Person Keelboat	3	~~15~~; ~~(DSQ)~~	4	~~15~~; ~~(DSQ)~~	2	6	6	12	1	1	3	38	5

Note: The points are totaled from the best 9 results of the 11 races, with lower totals being better.

== Shooting ==
Athlete	Event	Qualification		Final	
Athlete	Event	Score	Rank	Score	Rank
Doron Shaziri	Men's R7–50m Free Rifle 3x40 – SH1	1,158	2	1,259.9	Silver medal
Doron Shaziri	Mixed R6–50m Free Rifle Prone – SH1	586	10	did not advance	

== Swimming ==
Athlete	Events	Heat		Final	
Athlete	Events	Time	Rank	Time	Rank
Ziv Better	Men's 100 m freestyle – S12	1:01.13	13	did not advance	
Ziv Better	Men's 50 m freestyle – S12	27.35	11	did not advance	
Izhar Cohen	Men's 100 m freestyle – S11	1:06.71	13	did not advance	
Izhar Cohen	Men's 50 m freestyle – S11	28.66	12	did not advance	
Keren Leybovich	Women's 100 m backstroke – S8	1.22.99	5	1:21.34	4
Lioz Amar	Men's 100 m breaststroke – SB4	1:42.11	6	1:42.50	8
Inbal Pezaro	Women's 100 m freestyle – S5	1:22.89	4	1:21.57	Silver medal
Inbal Pezaro	Women's 200 m freestyle – S5	2:53.94	1	2:49.51	Silver medal
Inbal Pezaro	Women's 100 m breaststroke – SB4	2:01.28	1	1:57.75	Silver medal
Inbal Pezaro	Women's 50 m freestyle – S6	38.54	4	38.69	4
Inbal Schwartz	Women's 100 m backstroke – S6	1:48.14	12	did not advance	
Inbal Schwartz	Women's 50 m butterfly – S6	40.79	3	41.05	5
Iyad Shalabi	Men's 200 m freestyle – S2	5:41.04	8	5:34.47	6
Iyad Shalabi	Men's 100 m freestyle – S2	2:38.80	8	2:37.66	8
Iyad Shalabi	Men's 50 m freestyle – S2	1:14.55	6	1:10.51	4
Iyad Shalabi	Men's 50 m backstroke – S2	1:13.28	5	1:10.88	4

Key: WR=World record; PR=Paralympic record

== Table tennis ==
Athlete(s)	Event	Group matches		Round of 16	Quarterfinals	Semifinals	Bronze medal match	Finals	Rank
Athlete(s)	Event	Opposition Result	Rank	Opposition Result	Opposition Result	Opposition Result	Opposition Result	Opposition Result	Rank
Zeev Glikman; Shmuel Shur	Men's Team; Class 6–8	N/A		South Africa; W 3–0	Belgium; W 3–1	China; L 0–3	France; L 2–3	did not advance	4
Liran Geva	Men's Individual; Class 3	Egbinola (NGR); W 3–1	1 Q	Robin (FRA); L 0–3	did not advance				9–10
Liran Geva	Men's Individual; Class 3	Kramminger (AUS); W 3–1	1 Q	Robin (FRA); L 0–3	did not advance				9–10
David Altaraz	Men's Individual; Class 9–10	Kubov (UKR); L 2–3	3	did not advance					21–30
David Altaraz	Men's Individual; Class 9–10	Ma (CHN); L 0–3	3	did not advance					21–30
Zeev Glikman	Men's Individual; Class 8	Kent (CAN); W 3–1	2	did not advance					5–8
Zeev Glikman	Men's Individual; Class 8	Jambor (SVK); L 2–3	2	did not advance					5–8
Zeev Glikman	Men's Individual; Class 8	Ledoux (BEL); W 3–2	2	did not advance					5–8
Shmuel Shur	Men's Individual; Class 7	Popov (UKR); L 0–3	4	did not advance					13–16
Shmuel Shur	Men's Individual; Class 7	Wollmert (SVK); L 0–3	4	did not advance					13–16
Shmuel Shur	Men's Individual; Class 7	Bayley (GBR); L 1–3	4	did not advance					13–16

== Tennis ==
Athlete(s)	Event	Round of 32	Round of 16	Quarterfinals	Semifinals	Finals	Rank
Athlete(s)	Event	Opposition Result	Opposition Result	Opposition Result	Opposition Result	Opposition Result	Rank
Shraga Weinberg	Mixed Quad Singles	N/A	Burdekin (GBR); W 6–2 6–4	Wagner (USA); L 2–6 2–6	did not advance		5–8
Boaz Kramer	Mixed Quad Singles	N/A	Taylor (USA); L 3–6 3–6	did not advance			9–16
Ilanit Fridman	Women's Singles	Ohmae (JPN); W 6–4 6–0	Hu (CHN); L 1–6 3–6 6–4	did not advance			9–16
Shraga Weinberg; Boaz Kramer	Mixed Quad Doubles	N/A		Andersson, Jansson (SWE); W 6–2 6–4	Burdekin, Norfolk (GBR); W 6–4 6–4	Taylor, Wagner (USA); L 0–6 6–4 2–6	Silver medal
