= Noam Gershony =

Israeli wheelchair tennis player

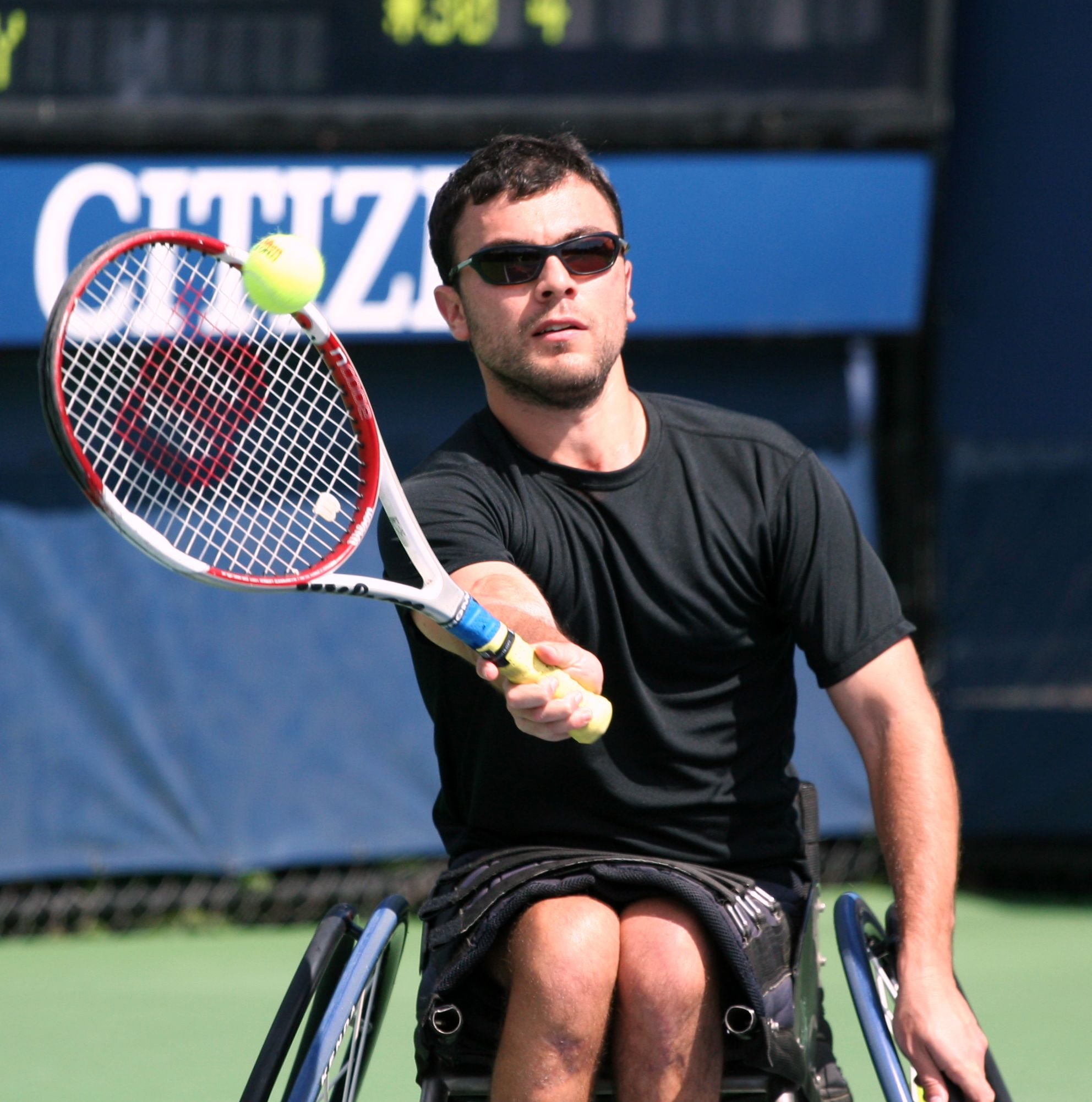
- Gershony, 2011 US Open
- Native name: נועם גרשוני
- Country (sports): Israel
- Born: 30 January 1983 (age 43) Kfar Saba, Israel
- Plays: Right Handed

Singles
- Career record: 114–23
- Career titles: 12
- Highest ranking: No. 1 (10 September 2012)

Grand Slam singles results
- Australian Open: RR (2012)
- French Open: W (2012)
- US Open: RR (2011)

Other tournaments
- Masters: W (2011)
- Paralympic Games: Gold Medal (2012)

Doubles
- Career record: 52–25
- Career titles: 5
- Highest ranking: No. 5 (30 January 2012)

Grand Slam doubles results
- Australian Open: F (2012)
- French Open: F (2012)
- US Open: F (2011)

Other doubles tournaments
- Paralympic Games: Bronze Medal (2012)

Team competitions
- World Team Cup: W (2012)
Medal record
Event / 1st / 2nd / 3rd; Paralympic Games / 1 / 0 / 1
Wheelchair tennis
Representing Israel
Summer Paralympics
Gold medal – first place	2012 London	Quad singles
Bronze medal – third place	2012 London	Quad doubles

Noam Gershony (Hebrew: נועם גרשוני; born 30 January 1983) is an Israeli wheelchair tennis player. At the 2012 Summer Paralympics he won a gold medal in Quad singles and shared a bronze in Quad doubles with Shraga Weinberg.

== Biography ==
Gershony served in the Israeli Defense Force as a pilot in the attack helicopter Boeing AH-64 Apache. During the 2006 Lebanon War his helicopter collided with another helicopter, an event which killed his co-pilot and left Gershony injured. He had many bone fractures and injuries in his four limbs. He went through medical rehabilitation and joined Beit Halochem sport centre in Tel Aviv where he started playing wheelchair tennis and surfing. Besides his sports career, Gershony volunteers at "Makom Acher", a hostel for at-risk youth in Tel Aviv, and teaches mathematics to teenagers.

== Tennis career ==
Gerhsony joined Beit Halochem Sport Center for Disabled Veterans in 2007 and began training, led by Coach Nimrod Bichler.

In December 2010, Gerhsony won first place in Quad Singles at an international tournament for wheelchair tennis in the Czech Republic. At the same tournament he also shared first place in the Quad Doubles with a French competitor. After this event he was ranked 29th in the world.

In September 2011 he qualified for the US Open finals. In November 2011 he won first place in the Tennis Masters Series in Belgium, in which the four best players in the world were participating. It was the first time an Israeli player qualified for the Quad Singles finals in that tournament.

In January 2012 he won first place in Australian Open events for wheelchair tennis in Sydney, after beating David Wagner, who was ranked second in the world.

In April 2012 he beat the gold medalist from the 2008 Summer Paralympics, Peter Norfolk, and won the Pensacola Open event.

In May 2012 he reached the Doubles Quad semi-finals in the Japan Open Tennis Championships.

On 1 July 2012 he won first place in Quad Singles in the French Open tournament, and shared second place in Quad Doubles with Boaz Kramer.

Later that year he participated in the 2012 Summer Paralympics. He won a gold medal in Quad Singles and shared a bronze medal with Shraga Weinberg. He was then selected to be his nation's flag-bearer at the 2012 Summer Paralympics closing ceremony.

== Honors ==
In 2018 Gershony was honored as one of the ceremonial torchbearers for Israel's 70th Independence Day.

== See also ==
- List of quad wheelchair tennis champions
