= Bas van Erp =

Dutch wheelchair tennis player

- Country (sports): Netherlands
- Born: 2 July 1979; Boxtel, Netherlands
- Died: 3 April 2016 (aged 36); Liempde, Boxel, Netherlands
Medal record
Paralympic Games
Bronze medal – third place	2004 Athens	Quad singles
Bronze medal – third place	2004 Athens	Quad doubles

Bas van Erp (Dutch pronunciation: [ˈbɑs fɑn ˈɛr(ə)p]; (Note: In isolation, van is pronounced [vɑn].) 2 July 1979 – 3 April 2016) was a Dutch wheelchair tennis player.

He won two bronze medals at the 2004 Paralympic Games; one in the quad singles event and the other one in the quad doubles event. After the 2004 Games he was about to stop playing wheelchair tennis, because he became very ill. When he recovered he decided to reach the Paralympic Games one more time. He competed at the 2008 Summer Paralympics, as in 2004 in the quad singles event and the quad doubles event but didn't win a medal.

In daily life he was receptionist and accountant. He died in his house in Liempde at the age of 36.

== Achievements ==
2004
(bronze) quad singles event 2004 Summer Paralympics
(bronze) quad doubles event 2004 Summer Paralympics
2nd singles event 2004 Wheelchair Tennis Masters (Amersfoort)
2008
1st doubles event 2008 Camozzi Wheelchair Tennis Doubles Masters (Bergamo) (together with Johan Andersson (SWE))
