= Lucas Sithole (tennis) =

South African wheelchair tennis player

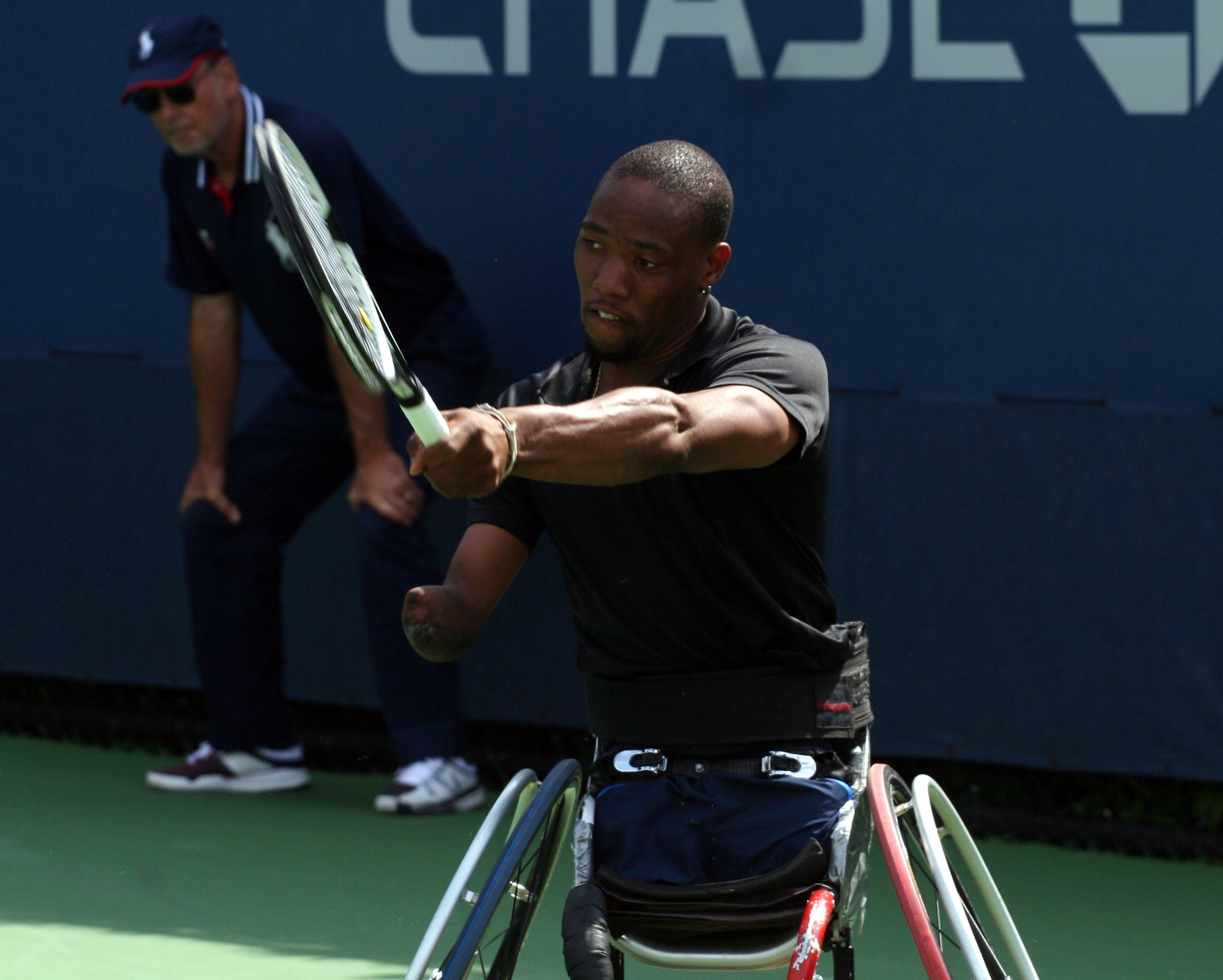
- Sithole in 2013
- Country (sports): South Africa
- Born: 30 September 1986 (age 38); Johannesburg, South Africa
- Plays: Left Handed

Singles
- Career record: 247–102
- Highest ranking: No. 2 (9 September 2013)
- Current ranking: No. 4 (19 December 2017)

Grand Slam singles results
- Australian Open: F (2014)
- US Open: W (2013)

Other tournaments
- Masters: F (2013)
- Paralympic Games: SF (2016)

Doubles
- Career record: 103–78
- Highest ranking: No. 3 (3 June 2013)
- Current ranking: No. 5 (19 December 2017)

Grand Slam doubles results
- Australian Open: W (2016)
- Wimbledon: F (2018)
- US Open: F (2013, 2014)

Lucas Sithole (born 30 September 1986) is a South African wheelchair tennis player. He plays in the Quad division of the sport. Sithole is the 2013 US Open wheelchair tennis quad champion. He also won the 2016 Australian Open Grand Slam in doubles, partnering David Wagner.

Due to missing certain anti-doping tests, Sithole was suspended from competition between 30 September 2019 and 30 September 2021.

== Tennis career ==
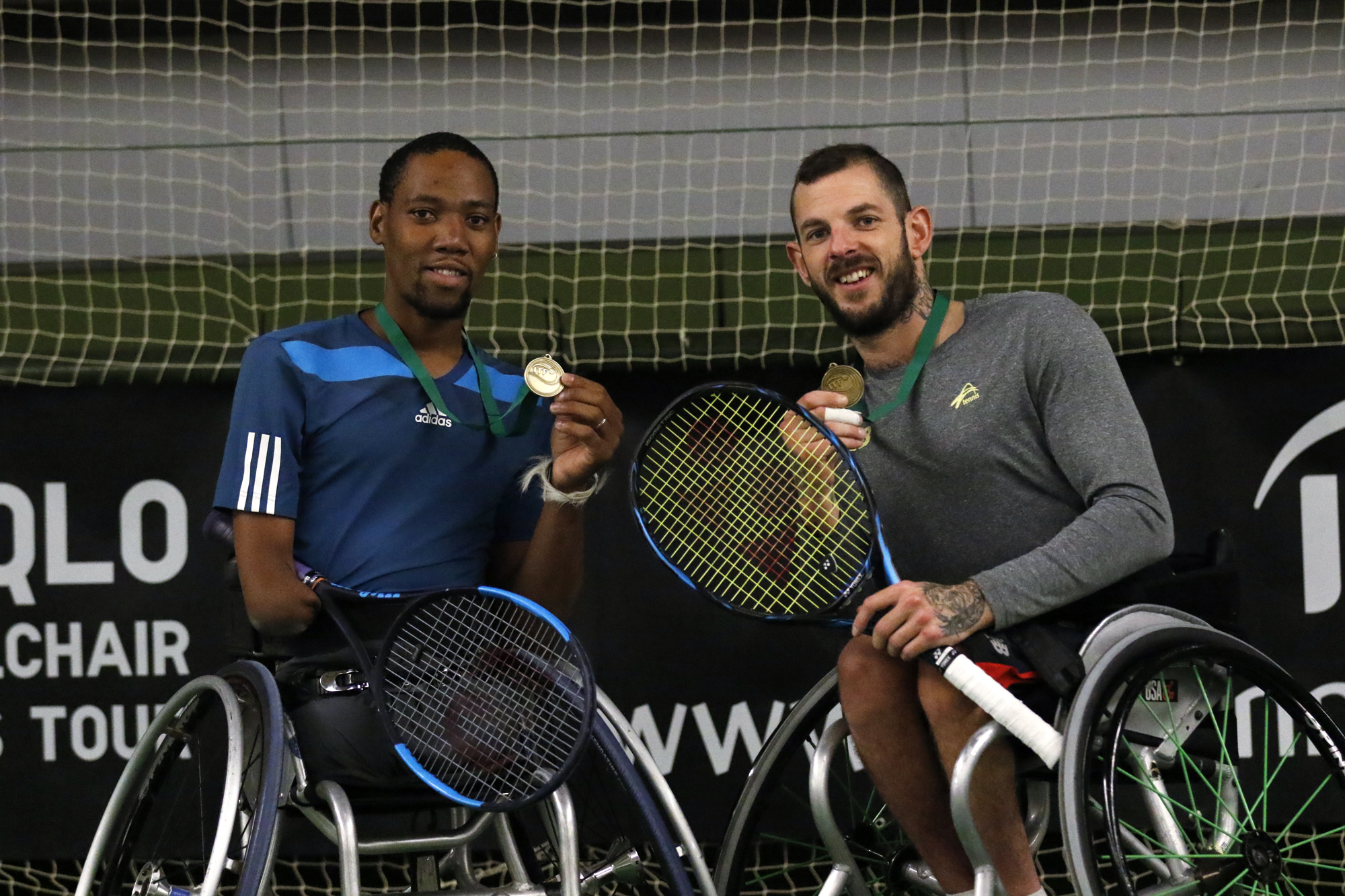
Lucas Sithole and Heath Davidson at the 2017 UNIQLO Doubles Masters

Lucas Sithole started competing in international wheelchair tennis events in 2006. In July 2011, he won the British Open wheelchair tennis tournament (Super Series) in Nottingham, Great Britain. In 2013, Sithole won the US Open Grand Slam. In the final, he played against World No 1 David Wagner, and won 3–6, 6–4, 6–4.

In the 2017 UNIQLO Wheelchair Doubles Masters, Lucas Sithole and Heath Davidson finished at the third place.

Sithole is the first African player to win a Super Series Event or a Grand Slam.

In 2018, Sithole was a runner-up alongside Dylan Alcott at the first ever men's quads doubles event during the 2018 Wimbledon Championships.

== Personal life ==
Sithole is a native of KwaZulu-Natal. He became a triple amputee in 1998 following a train accident.
