= Peter Vikström =

Swedish wheelchair tennis player

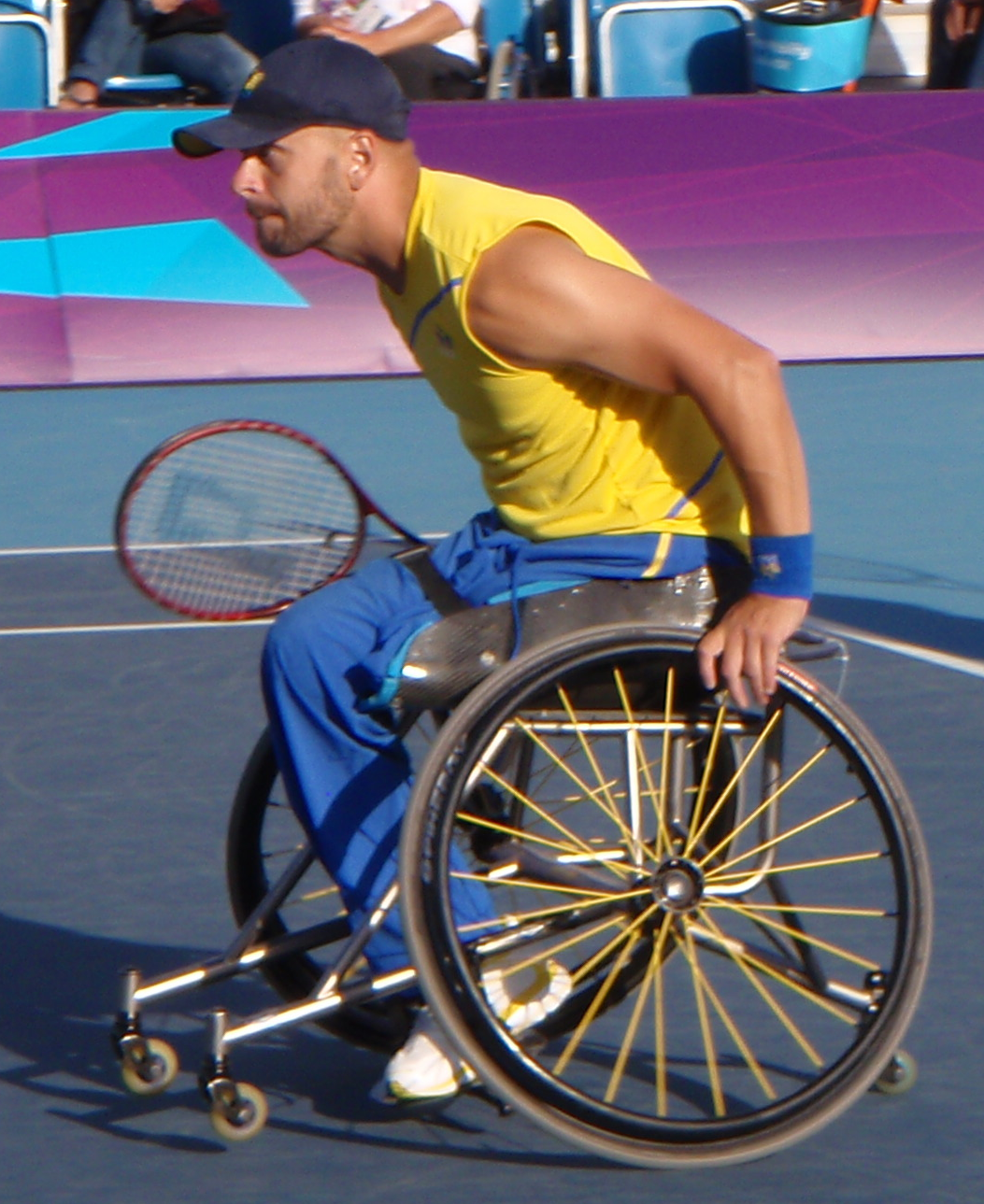
- Vikstrom playing during the London 2012 Paralympic Men's Doubles semifinal.
- Born: 4 January 1977 (age 48); Piteå, Sweden

Peter Vikström (born 4 January 1977 in Piteå) is a wheelchair tennis player. He won the Paralympic men's doubles competition at the 2012 Summer Paralympics with his partner Stefan Olsson. He started playing tennis when he was 21.
