= Boaz Kramer =

Israeli wheelchair tennis player

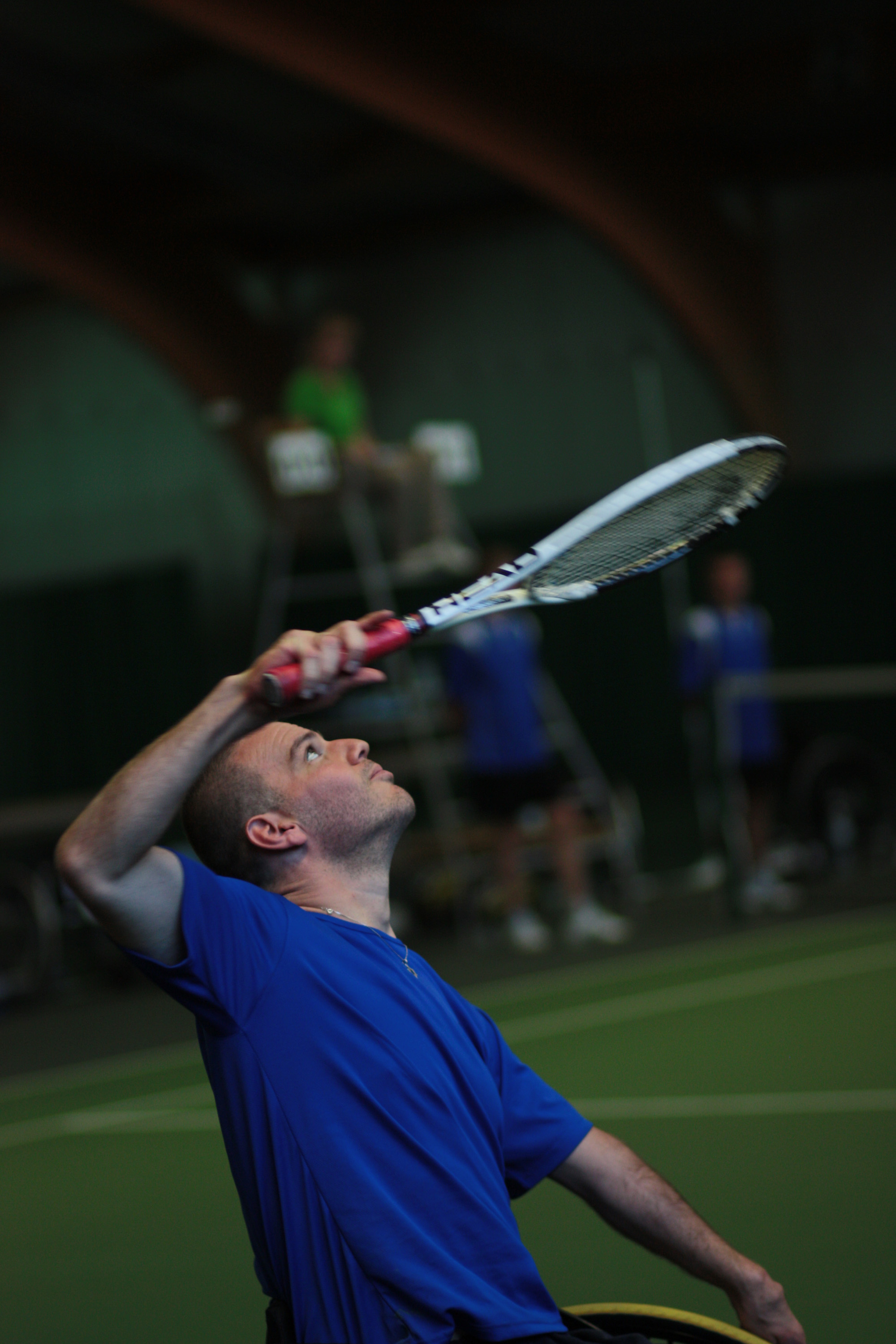
- Native name: בועז קרמר
- Country (sports): Israel
- Residence: Tel Aviv, Israel
- Born: 12 January 1978 (age 48) Israel
- Turned pro: 2005
- Plays: Right-handed (quad division)
- Coach: Kobi Wiener

Singles
- Highest ranking: No.9 (2012)

Other tournaments
- Paralympic Games: R1 (2008)

Doubles
- Highest ranking: No.9 (2009)

Other doubles tournaments
- Paralympic Games: Silver Medal (2008)
Medal record
Wheelchair tennis
Representing Israel
Summer Paralympics
Silver medal – second place	2008 Beijing	Quad doubles

Boaz Kramer (Hebrew: בועז קרמר; born 12 January 1978) is an Israeli former professional wheelchair tennis player. He is a two-time Paralympian and a silver medalist in quad wheelchair tennis from the 2008 Beijing Games.

Born with arthrogryposis, he has been involved in adaptive sports since age five and has served as Executive Director of the Israel ParaSport Center in Ramat Gan since 2011. He lives in Tel Aviv with his wife and three children.

== Biography ==
Boaz Kramer was born in Israel with arthrogryposis, a rare congenital condition characterized by multiple joint contractures and muscle weakness which partially paralyzed his left arm and both legs.

At the age of five he began practicing disabled sports at the Israel Sports Center for the Disabled. He was active in wheelchair basketball and wheelchair tennis, competing internationally in tennis. Kramer also studied medicine at the Tel Aviv University School of Medicine , where he earned his M.D.

After decades of elite wheelchair tennis training and daily hand-cycling, Kramer suffered progressive physical wear that resulted in severe nerve compression. In April 2025, he underwent emergency cervical spine surgery at the Tel Aviv Medical Center to relieve immense pressure on his spinal cord. The procedure involved the removal of a cervical vertebra and adjacent discs, which were replaced with a permanent metal plate and fixation screws.

Kramer is married to Shirley Faitelson since 2008, and lives in Tel Aviv. He is a father of three children, Rommy (daughter), Suf (son), and Ofri (daughter).

== Sports career ==
=== Wheelchair tennis competitor ===
In 2012, Kramer was ranked 9th in the world in wheelchair tennis.

Towards the 2008 Paralympic Games, Kramer was chosen by the Israeli Paralympic Committee as Shraga Weinberg's partner in the wheelchair tennis doubles tournament. He competed in the singles event and was eliminated by World Number 3 Nicolas Taylor, In the doubles tournament he and Weinberg won silver.

In 2012, Kramer together with Shraga Weinberg and Noam Gershony won the Wheelchair Tennis World Team Cup.

In the London 2012 Paralympic Games Kramer reached 1/4 Final, where he lost to World Number 1 David Wagner.

=== Sports administrator ===
Since 2011 he has served as executive director of the Israel Sport Center for the Disabled, one of the largest Disabled Sport Facilities and programs in the worlda. In 2012, Kramer was elected by the Israeli Globes newspaper as one of the 40 most prominent young CEOs in the country.

== See also ==
- Israel at the 2008 Summer Paralympics
