= Jamie Burdekin =

British wheelchair tennis player

- Country (sports): Great Britain
- Born: 10 December 1979 (age 46) Liverpool, England

Doubles
- Paralympic Games: Bronze Medal (2008)
Medal record
Paralympic Games
Bronze medal – third place	2008 Beijing	Quad Doubles
Bronze medal – third place	2016 Rio de Janeiro	Quad Doubles

Jamie Burdekin (born 10 December 1979) is a retired English wheelchair tennis player. He competed at the 2008 Summer Paralympics, the 2012 Summer Paralympics and the 2016 Summer Paralympics.

He won the bronze medal together with Peter Norfolk in the Quad Doubles event at the 2008 Summer Paralympics.

Norfolk and Burdekin also won the Quad Doubles event at the Japan Open as part of the 2012 ITF Wheelchair Tennis Tour.

He also won the bronze medal in the Quad Doubles event at the 2016 Summer Paralympics held in Rio de Janeiro, Brazil, together with Andrew Lapthorne.

In 2014 and 2015, Lapthorne and Burdekin also won the silver medals in the Quad Doubles event of the Wheelchair Tennis Masters.

In 2004, Jamie Burdekin tested positive for cocaine during the British Open Wheelchair Tennis Championships and received a two-year suspension. In 2017, Burdekin received a four-year ban after refusing to submit to an out-of-competition drug test. Although he claimed to be retired, he had not formally notified the International Tennis Federation, leaving him subject to testing under anti-doping rules.
