= Sarah Hunter (tennis) =

Canadian wheelchair tennis player

- Born: March 16, 1965 (age 60) White Rock, British Columbia
- Height: 175 cm (5 ft 9 in)
- Turned pro: 2000
- Retired: 2017

Singles

Grand Slam singles results
- Australian Open: QF (2008)

Doubles

Grand Slam doubles results
- Australian Open: F (2008)
- US Open: F (2007)
- Masters Doubles: W (2003, 2004)

Sarah Hunter is a retired Canadian Paralympian in wheelchair tennis. At the Paralympics, she competed in the 2004 Summer Paralympics and 2008 Summer Paralympics but did not medal. Outside of the Paralympics, Hunter won the quads division at the 2003 and 2004 Wheelchair Tennis Masters alongside Peter Norfolk.

== Early life ==
Hunter was born on March 16, 1965, in White Rock, British Columbia.

== Career ==
Hunter began her sports career as a member of the Canada women's national lacrosse team. She became paralyzed from the waist down after an accident while playing hockey in 1997. A few years later, Hunter started playing wheelchair tennis in 2000. In Canada, she won the Birmingham National Wheelchair Tennis Championships eleven times in singles competitions and seven times in doubles. In international competitions, Hunter won the 2003 and 2004 Wheelchair Tennis Masters in quads with Peter Norfolk.

Hunter participated at the 2004 Summer Paralympics and 2008 Summer Paralympics in wheelchair tennis but did not medal. After becoming a Paralympic torchbearer at the 2010 Winter Paralympics, Hunter sustained a dislocated shoulder while competing with her teammate Adrian Dielman in 2011. Her injuries forced her to withdraw from competition for the majority of the 2012 season. When she returned to competition in 2013, Hunter continued to compete until her retirement in 2017. Upon retiring, Hunter started training to become a tennis coach.

== Awards and honours ==
During her career, Hunter was named female athlete of the year three times by the Canadian Wheelchair Sports Association.

== Personal life ==
Hunter has a daughter.
