= Peter Norfolk =

British wheelchair tennis player

Peter Norfolk OBE
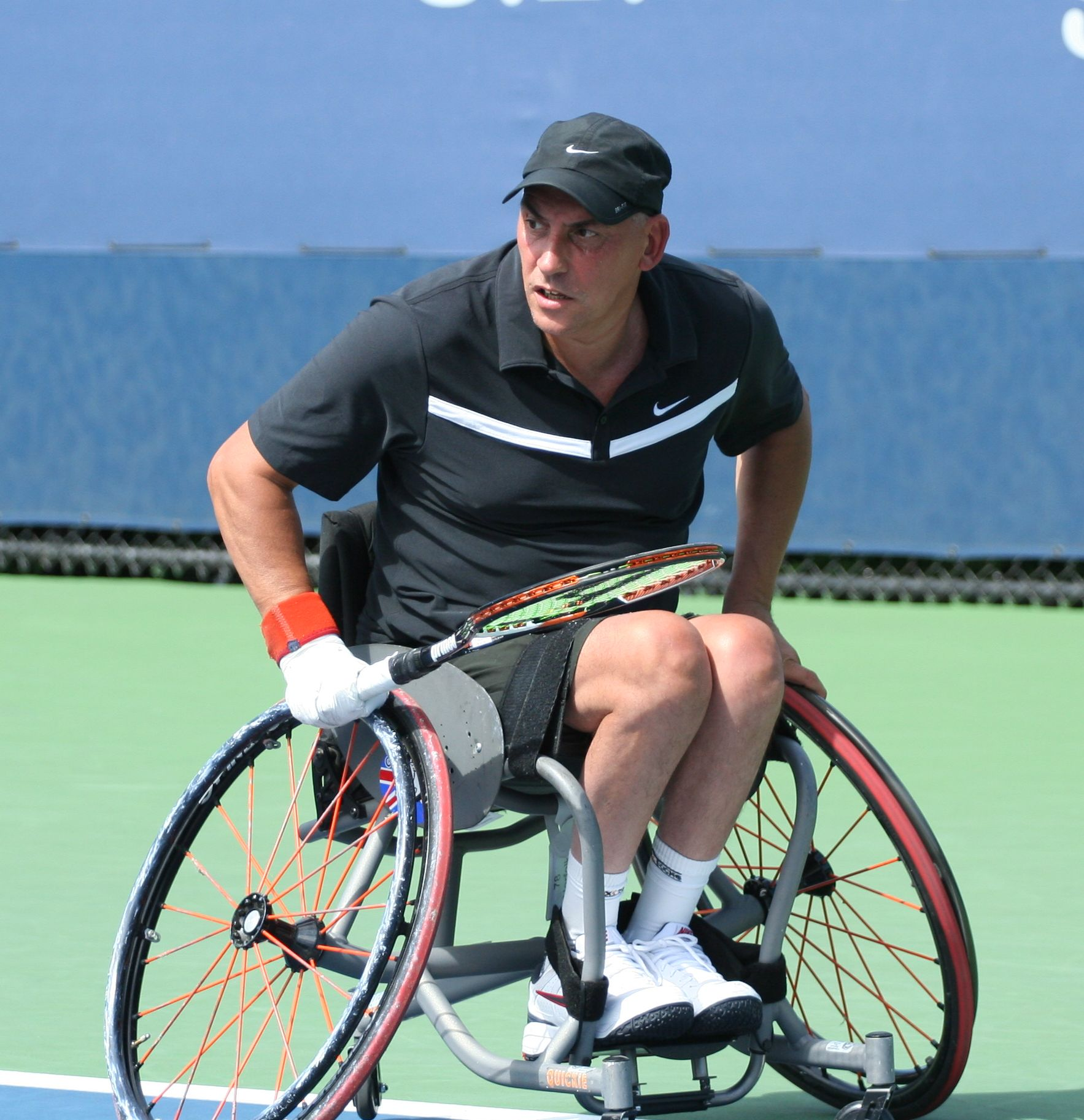
- Peter Norfolk at the 2011 US Open
- Country (sports): Great Britain
- Residence: Truro, Cornwall
- Born: 13 December 1960 (age 65) London
- Turned pro: 1991
- Retired: 2013
- Official website: Official website

Singles
- Career record: 256–38
- Highest ranking: No.1 (29 September 2003)

Grand Slam singles results
- Australian Open: W (2008, 2009, 2010, 2012)
- US Open: W (2007, 2009)

Other tournaments
- Masters: W (2006, 2009, 2010)
- Paralympic Games: Gold Medal (2004, 2008)

Doubles
- Career record: 127–55
- Highest ranking: No.1 (12 September 2011)

Grand Slam doubles results
- Australian Open: W (2011, 2012)
- US Open: F (2007, 2009, 2010)

Other doubles tournaments
- Masters Doubles: W (2003, 2004, 2010)
- Paralympic Games: Silver Medal (2004, 2012)

Team competitions
- World Team Cup: Champion (2001, 2002, 2009)
Medal record
Paralympic Games
Gold medal – first place	2004 Athens	Quad singles
Gold medal – first place	2008 Beijing	Quad singles
Silver medal – second place	2004 Athens	Quad doubles
Silver medal – second place	2012 London	Quad doubles
Bronze medal – third place	2008 Beijing	Quad doubles

Peter Robert Norfolk OBE (born 13 December 1960) is a British wheelchair tennis player. Following a motorbike accident which left him paraplegic, he uses a wheelchair. He took up tennis and following a further spinal complication in 2000, he began competing in the quad division. He is nicknamed The Quadfather.

He has multiple Grand Slam and Super Series titles, and competed for Great Britain at the Summer Paralympics when tennis made its first appearance at Athens 2004. He won the gold medal in the singles, and defended it at Beijing, as well as adding a bronze medal in the doubles. He competed in his third Paralympics in 2012 in London, where he was also the flagbearer for Great Britain at the opening ceremony. Norfolk announced his retirement in January 2013.

== Early life ==
Norfolk was born in London on 13 December 1960. Norfolk became a paraplegic after motorbike accident in 1979 at the age of 19. He was hospitalised for over a year, and the disability resulted in him requiring a wheelchair. There was a further complication in 2000, damage was caused to cervical spinal nerve 7 resulted in Norfolk additionally losing strength in his right arm and shoulder.

== Tennis career ==
Norfolk became a wheelchair tennis player at the age of 30, having seen a demonstration at Stoke Mandeville. He competes in the quad division. This means he competes against other players with a disability in at least three limbs. He plays with a tennis racket taped to his hand, and competes in the NEC Wheelchair Tennis Tour.

He was the first person to win a Paralympic medal for Britain in tennis when he took gold in the quads singles at the 2004 Summer Paralympics in Athens, defeating David Wagner of the United States. It had been the first occasion where a tennis event had been included in a Paralympic programme. He also won a silver medal with Mark Eccleston in the quad doubles event. Following his victories, in 2005 he was invited to perform the coin toss ahead of the men's singles final at Wimbledon.

He represented Great Britain again at the 2008 Summer Paralympics in Beijing, winning gold in the singles event and bronze in doubles with Jamie Burdekin. He sees the defeat in the semi-final as the biggest disappointment in his tennis career.

In the 2010 season, he missed out on finishing overall as world number one by eight ranking points, despite winning the end of season Wheelchair Masters tournament. He beat Wagner 6–3, 7–6 (7–4), but his opponent ended the season one place above him in the rankings. Wagner beat him at the 2011 Australian Open, marking the first occasion Norfolk had been defeated in an Australian Open final, having previously defeated Wagner in on four occasions in 2004, 2008, 2009 and 2010. It did however mark the first occasion that Norfolk had won a doubles tournament in Australia, partnered with Andrew Lapthorne.

He regained the Australian Open title in 2012, beating Wagner in the final and becoming world number one once more. It marked his fifth victory at the grand slam tournament. He was also victorious once more in the doubles, teaming with Lapthorne again to defeat Wagner and his partner Noam Gershony.

He carried the torch in Liverpool during the 2012 Summer Olympics torch relay. He was the winner of both the singles and the doubles events in the pre-Paralympic test event at Eton Manor in May 2012. On 19 June 2012 was named once more to the British squad for the Paralympics, to compete at London 2012. He is one of three men's quad division tennis players, alongside Burdekin and Lapthorne. He admitted that the Games placed a great deal of pressure on his performance saying, "This year is about the Paralympics and everyone is expecting me to win, so it will be my year to see where I'm at." In the event, he did not win a medal in the singles, losing his quarter-final match to Shraga Weinberg, but won silver in the doubles, again partnered with Andrew Lapthorne.

Norfolk has multiple Super Series titles. He has finished the year as world number one on five occasions, and won the Team World Cup three times. He has a rivalry with Wagner, with the two swapping the number one and number two ranked positions in the quad division on a regular basis. Norfolk was awarded the Carl Aarvold Award for International Achievement by the Lawn Tennis Association in 2012. Norfolk was voted to carry the British flag at the opening ceremony of the 2012 Summer Paralympic Games in London. Norfolk announced his retirement in January 2013. He was part of Channel Four's commentary team for the Tokyo Paralympics that were held in 2021.

== Personal life ==
In 1989, Peter founded a company called Equipment for the Physically Challenged, which specialises in mobility equipment for physically disabled people. He is married to a sports physiotherapist named Linda, and has two children. He was named a Member of the Most Excellent Order of the British Empire (MBE) in 2005, and an Officer of the British Empire (OBE) in 2009, in both cases for services to disabled sport. He uses tennis rackets from Prince Sports, and his sports wheelchair is by Quickie Matchpoint.

== Grand Slam titles ==
Singles

- 2007 US Open
- 2008 Australian Open
- 2009 Australian Open
- 2010 Australian Open
- 2012 Australian Open

Doubles

- 2011 Australian Open
- 2012 Australian Open

== See also ==
- List of quad wheelchair tennis champions

Preceded by First Award; David Wagner; David Wagner	Year End Number 1 – Quad Singles; 2003–2004; 2006; 2008–2009	Succeeded by David Wagner; David Wagner; David Wagner
