= Shraga Weinberg =

Israeli wheelchair tennis player

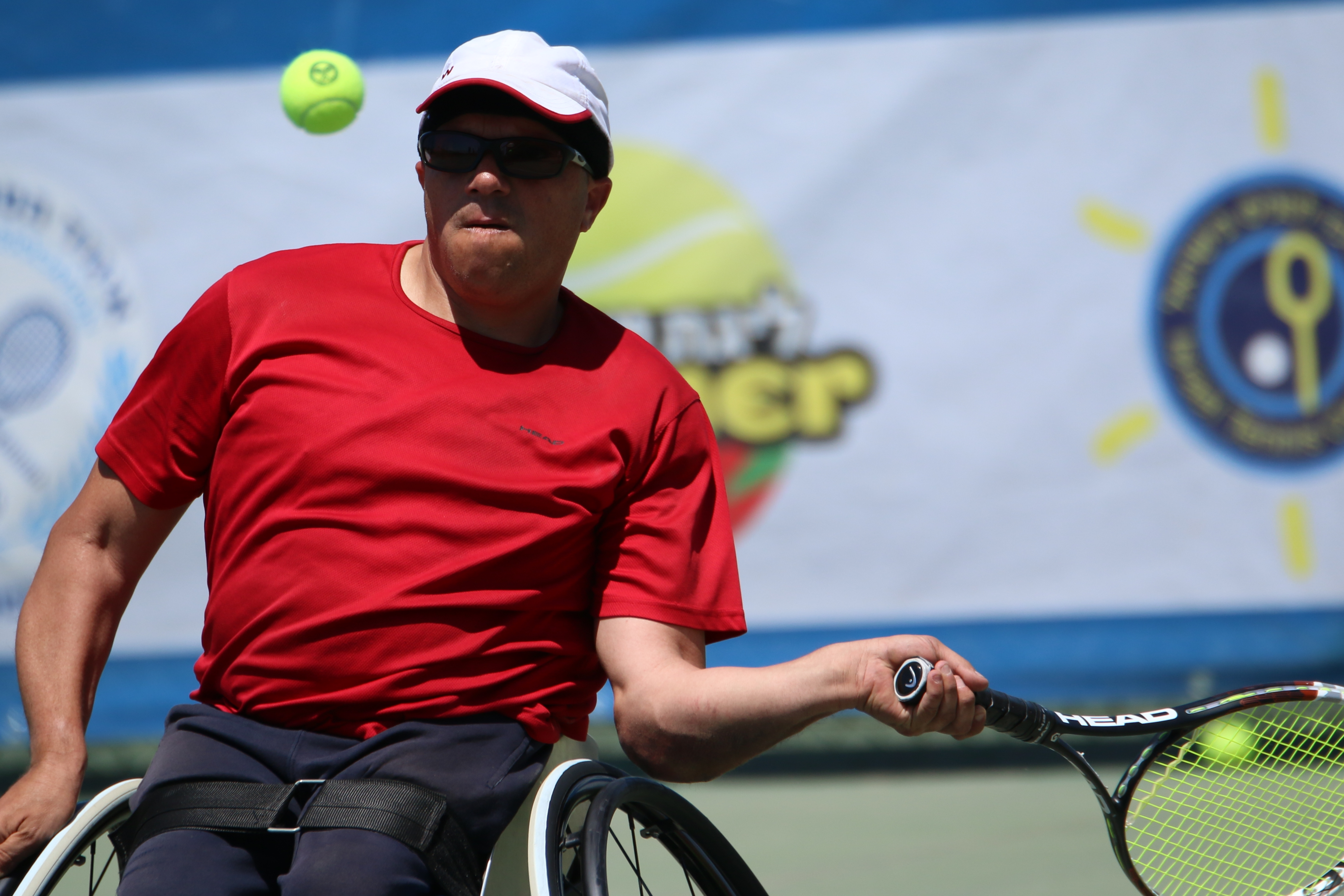
- Native name: שרגא וינברג
- Country (sports): Israel
- Born: 10 March 1966 (age 59); Petach Tiqva, Israel
- Plays: Left Handed

Singles
- Highest ranking: No.1 (September 2001)
- Current ranking: No.10
- Paralympic Games: QF (2004, 2008)

Doubles
- Highest ranking: No.1 (September 2003)
- Current ranking: No.21

Other doubles tournaments
- Masters Doubles: F (2009)
- Paralympic Games: Silver Medal (2008); Bronze Medal (2012)
Medal record
Wheelchair tennis
Representing Israel
Summer Paralympics
Silver medal – second place	2008 Beijing	Quad doubles
Bronze medal – third place	2012 London	Quad doubles

Shraga Weinberg (Hebrew: שרגא וינברג; born 25 March 1966 in Petah Tikva) is an Israeli wheelchair tennis player.

Weinberg was born in 1966, paralyzed in his upper body. He also has bone density abnormalities, which caused him to go through many surgeries in his younger years. For his recreation and rehabilitation, he began practicing disabled sports at the Israel Sports Center for the Disabled. In 2008 he was ranked 8th in the world in wheelchair tennis.

In wheelchair tennis, Weinberg was ranked 1st in 2001 for singles' tournaments and in 2003 for couples' tournaments. In the five years prior to the 2004 Summer Paralympics, he was also ranked at the top of the Israeli chart. At the Paralympic Games he competed in singles and lost at the quarter-final.

Weinberg works as an accountant, making it difficult for him to develop his tennis game. In 2007 he took part only in three international tournaments, however he continued to be ranked among the top 10 players, enabling him to qualify for the 2008 Summer Paralympics. At those games, he took silver in the mixed doubles event with Boaz Kremer. He also competed in singles, but lost in the quarterfinals to eventual bronze medalist David Wagner of the United States. At the 2012 Summer Paralympics, Weinberg and his partner, Noam Gershony, won the bronze medal in the quad doubles, beating Shota Kawano and Mitsuteru Moroishi of Japan 6–3, 6–1.
