= Nicholas Taylor (tennis) =

American wheelchair tennis player

Nick Taylor
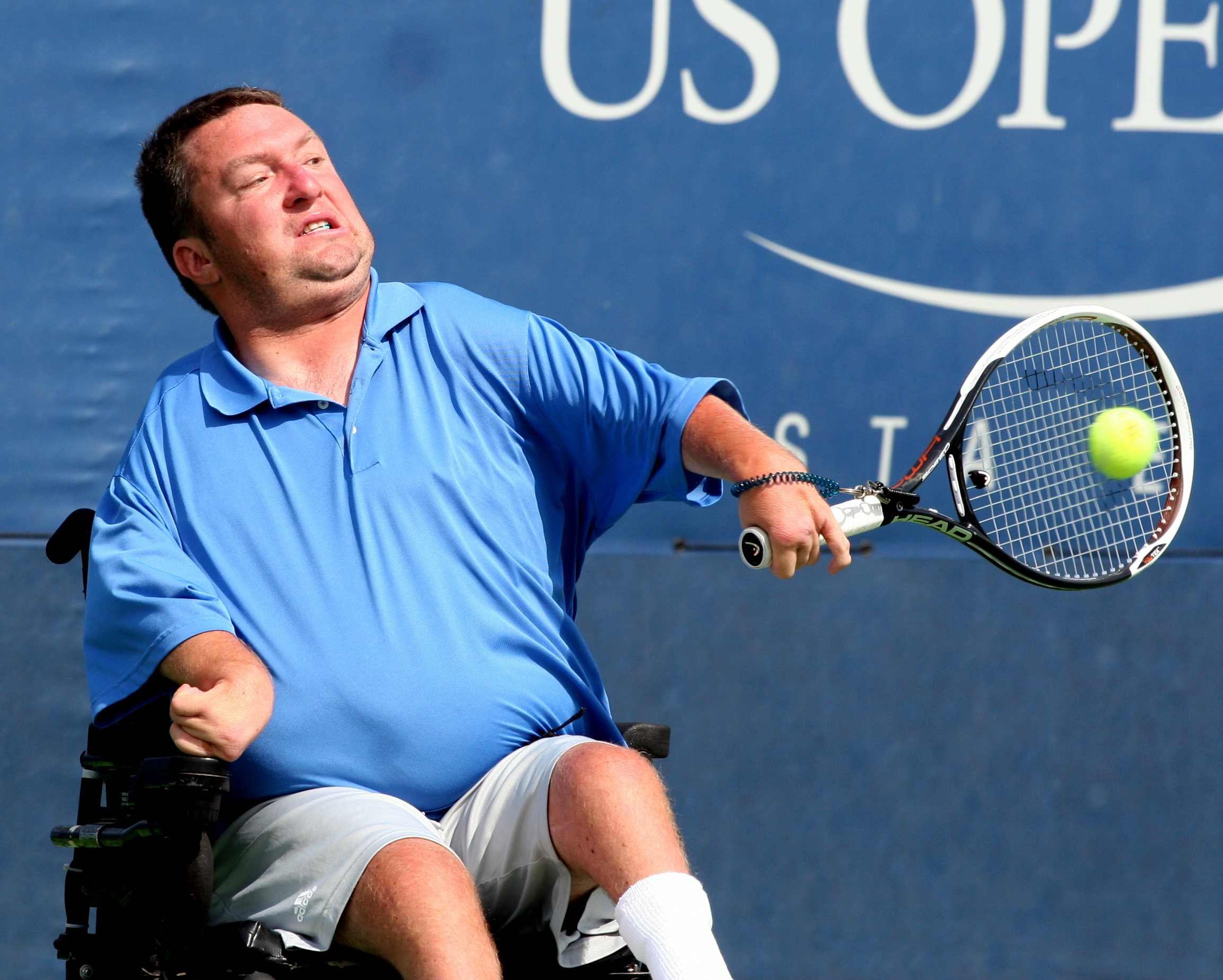
- Taylor at the 2013 US Open
- Full name: Nicholas Taylor
- Country (sports): United States
- Residence: Wichita, Kansas
- Born: November 12, 1979 (age 46) Wichita, Kansas
- Plays: Left-handed

Singles
- Career record: 350-221
- Highest ranking: No.1 (August 6, 2001)
- Current ranking: No.14 (June 9, 2018)

Grand Slam singles results
- Australian Open: SF (2008, 2009, 2010, 2011, 2013)
- US Open: SF (2007, 2008, 2009, 2010, 2011, 2013)

Doubles
- Career record: 376-76
- Highest ranking: No.1 (July 28, 2003)
- Current ranking: No.8 (June 9, 2018)

Grand Slam doubles results
- Australian Open: W (2008, 2009, 2010, 2013) F (2011)
- US Open: W (2007, 2009, 2010, 2011, 2013, 2014, 2015)

Other doubles tournaments
- Masters Doubles: W (2005, 2006, 2007, 2009, 2011, 2012, 2013, 2014, 2015, 2017, 2018)
- Paralympic Games: Gold Medal (2004, 2008, 2012)
Medal record
Men's wheelchair tennis
Representing the United States
Paralympic Games
Silver medal – second place	2016 Rio	Quad doubles
Gold medal – first place	2012 London	Quad Doubles
Gold medal – first place	2008 Beijing	Quad Doubles
Gold medal – first place	2004 Athens	Quad Doubles

Nicholas Taylor (born November 12, 1979) is an American wheelchair tennis player. Nick started playing tennis at the age of 14. He has played 5 times in the Australian Open and 7 times in the US Open (tennis). He has a total of 11 grand slam quad doubles titles, all of them won with partner David Wagner. Taylor and Wagner are the most successful partnership to ever play at the UNIQLO Wheelchair Doubles Masters. They have won the title 11 times as of November 2018.

== Tennis career ==
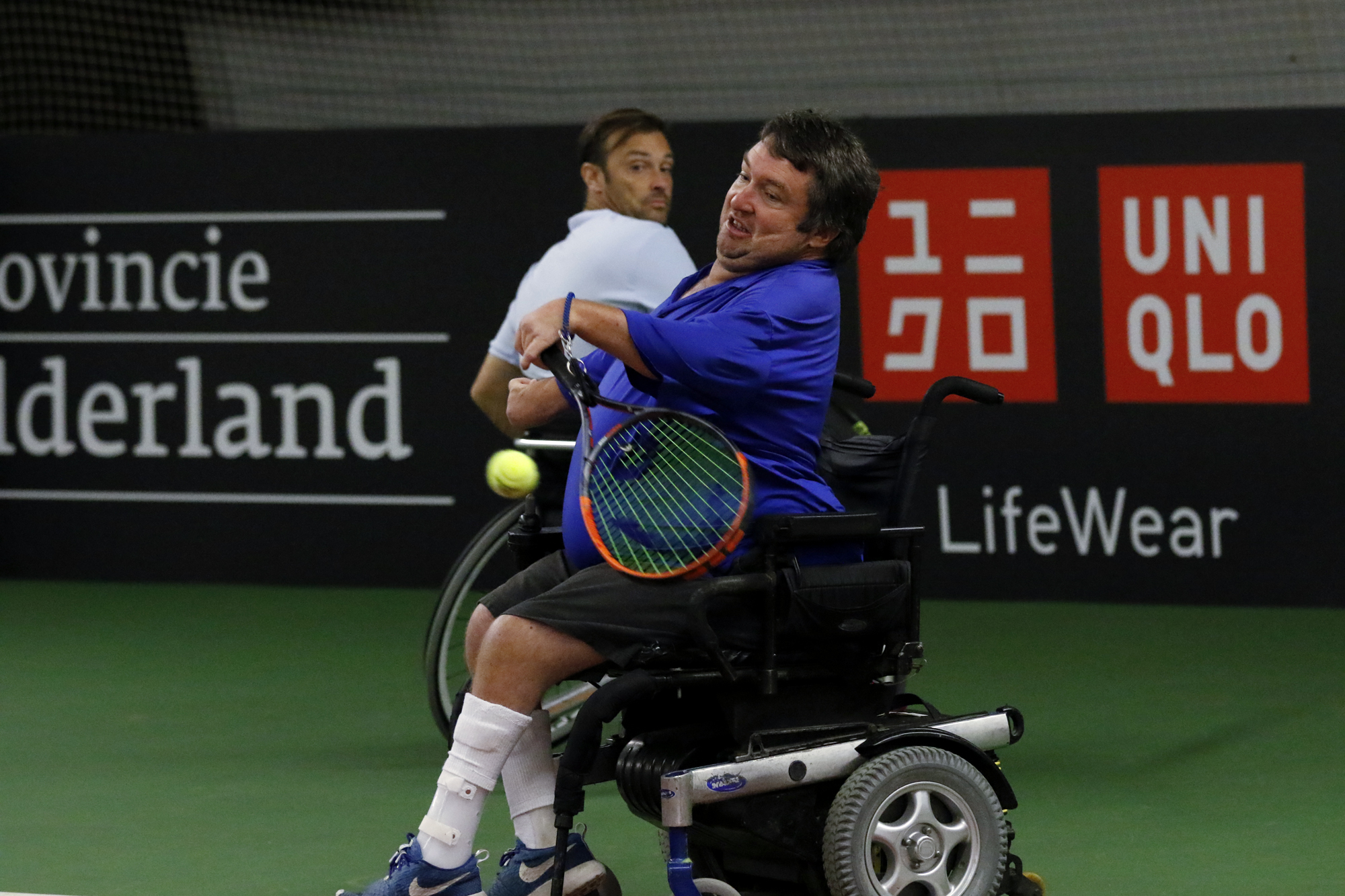
Nick Taylor and David Wagner at the 2017 Doubles Masters in Bemmel

In July 2000, Nick Taylor and Kevin Whalen won the quads doubles title at the 2000 British Open wheelchair tennis tournament, in Nottingham, Great Britain. A few months later, in October 2000, Taylor also won his first major tournament in singles, at the US Open wheelchair tennis super series event.

In early 2004, Taylor and Wagner started playing doubles together, and soon became the most dominant doubles team in the history of wheelchair tennis. Together they have won 4 Paralympic medals, 11 Doubles Masters titles, 7 US Open grand slam titles and 4 Australian Open grand slam titles.

Taylor is known for his spectacular kick-serve technique.

== Personal ==
Taylor was born with arthrogryposis. He has a master's degree in sports management from the Wichita State University. He is also an assistant coach for the men's tennis program at Wichita State University.
