= List of men's wheelchair tennis champions =

Champions list

This is a list of the wheelchair tennis champions at the Grand Slam and the Wheelchair Tennis Masters events in the men's division since the introduction of the NEC Tour in 1992. Champions from the wheelchair tennis events at the Paralympic Games are also included.

== Champions by year ==
Legend
bold outline	Player won the Grand Slam (four major tournaments in the same year).

=== Wheelchair men's singles ===
Year	Grand Slam tournaments				Masters	Paralympics
Year	Australian Open	French Open	Wimbledon	US Open	Masters	Paralympics
1992	not held	not held	not held	not held	not held	Randy Snow
1994	not held	not held	not held	not held	Randy Snow	not held
1995	not held	not held	not held	not held	Laurent Giammartini	not held
1996	not held	not held	not held	not held	Stephen Welch	Ricky Molier
1997	not held	not held	not held	not held	Kai Schrameyer	not held
1998	not held	not held	not held	not held	Ricky Molier	not held
1999	not held	not held	not held	not held	Robin Ammerlaan	not held
2000	not held	not held	not held	not held	Robin Ammerlaan	David Hall
2001	not held	not held	not held	not held	Ricky Molier	not held
2002	Robin Ammerlaan	not held	not held	not held	David Hall	not held
2003	David Hall	not held	not held	not held	Robin Ammerlaan	not held
2004	David Hall	not held	not held	not held	David Hall	Robin Ammerlaan
2005	David Hall	not held	not held	Robin Ammerlaan	Robin Ammerlaan	not held
2006	Michaël Jérémiasz	not held	not held	Robin Ammerlaan	Robin Ammerlaan	not held
2007	Shingo Kunieda	Shingo Kunieda	not held	Shingo Kunieda	Robin Ammerlaan	not held
2008	Shingo Kunieda	Shingo Kunieda	not held	not held	Stefan Olsson	Shingo Kunieda
2009	Shingo Kunieda	Shingo Kunieda	not held	Shingo Kunieda	Maikel Scheffers	not held
2010	Shingo Kunieda	Shingo Kunieda	not held	Shingo Kunieda	Stefan Olsson	not held
2011	Shingo Kunieda	Maikel Scheffers	not held	Shingo Kunieda	Stéphane Houdet	not held
2012	Maikel Scheffers	Stéphane Houdet	not held	not held	Shingo Kunieda	Shingo Kunieda
2013	Shingo Kunieda	Stéphane Houdet	not held	Stéphane Houdet	Shingo Kunieda	not held
2014	Shingo Kunieda	Shingo Kunieda	not held	Shingo Kunieda	Shingo Kunieda	not held
2015	Shingo Kunieda	Shingo Kunieda	not held	Shingo Kunieda	Joachim Gérard	not held
2016	Gordon Reid	Gustavo Fernández	Gordon Reid	not held	Joachim Gérard	Gordon Reid
2017	Gustavo Fernández	Alfie Hewett	Stefan Olsson	Stéphane Houdet	Alfie Hewett	not held
2018	Shingo Kunieda	Shingo Kunieda	Stefan Olsson	Alfie Hewett	Joachim Gérard	not held
2019	Gustavo Fernández	Gustavo Fernández	Gustavo Fernández	Alfie Hewett	Joachim Gérard	not held
2020	Shingo Kunieda	Alfie Hewett	cancelled	Shingo Kunieda	cancelled	Rescheduled
2021	Joachim Gérard	Alfie Hewett	Joachim Gérard	Shingo Kunieda	Alfie Hewett	Shingo Kunieda
2022	Shingo Kunieda	Shingo Kunieda	Shingo Kunieda	Alfie Hewett	Tokito Oda	not held
2023	Alfie Hewett	Tokito Oda	Tokito Oda	Alfie Hewett	Alfie Hewett	not held
2024	Tokito Oda	Tokito Oda	Alfie Hewett	not held	Tokito Oda	Tokito Oda
2025	Alfie Hewett	Tokito Oda	Tokito Oda	Tokito Oda	Tokito Oda	not held
2026	Tokito Oda	Tokito Oda	Tokito Oda	Alfie Hewett		not held

=== Wheelchair men's doubles ===
Year	Grand Slam tournaments				Masters	Paralympics
Year	Australian Open	French Open	Wimbledon	US Open	Masters	Paralympics
1992	not held	not held	not held	not held	not held	Brad Parks; Randy Snow
1996	not held	not held	not held	not held	not held	Stephen Welch; Vance Parmelly
2000	not held	not held	not held	not held	Ricky Molier; Stephen Welch	Ricky Molier; Robin Ammerlaan
2001	not held	not held	not held	not held	Miroslav Brychta; Martin Legner	not held
2002	not held	not held	not held	not held	Kai Schrameyer; Stephen Welch	not held
2003	not held	not held	not held	not held	Martin Legner; Satoshi Saida	not held
2004	Robin Ammerlaan; Martin Legner	not held	not held	not held	Martin Legner; Satoshi Saida	Shingo Kunieda; Satoshi Saida
2005	Robin Ammerlaan; Martin Legner	not held	Michaël Jérémiasz; Jayant Mistry	Robin Ammerlaan; Michaël Jérémiasz	Michaël Jérémiasz; Jayant Mistry	not held
2006	Robin Ammerlaan; Martin Legner	not held	Satoshi Saida; Shingo Kunieda	Robin Ammerlaan; Michaël Jérémiasz	Maikel Scheffers; Ronald Vink	not held
2007	Robin Ammerlaan; Shingo Kunieda	Stéphane Houdet; Michaël Jérémiasz	Robin Ammerlaan; Ronald Vink	Satoshi Saida; Shingo Kunieda	Stéphane Houdet; Michaël Jérémiasz	not held
2008	Shingo Kunieda; Satoshi Saida	Shingo Kunieda; Maikel Scheffers	Robin Ammerlaan; Ronald Vink	not held	Stefan Olsson; Peter Vikström	Stéphane Houdet; Michaël Jérémiasz
2009	Robin Ammerlaan; Shingo Kunieda	Stéphane Houdet; Michaël Jérémiasz	Stéphane Houdet; Michaël Jérémiasz	Stéphane Houdet; Stefan Olsson	Maikel Scheffers; Ronald Vink	not held
2010	Stéphane Houdet; Shingo Kunieda	Stéphane Houdet; Shingo Kunieda	Robin Ammerlaan; Stefan Olsson	Maikel Scheffers; Ronald Vink	Maikel Scheffers; Ronald Vink	not held
2011	Shingo Kunieda; Maikel Scheffers	Shingo Kunieda; Nicolas Peifer	Maikel Scheffers; Ronald Vink	Stéphane Houdet; Nicolas Peifer	Tom Egberink; Michaël Jérémiasz	not held
2012	Robin Ammerlaan; Ronald Vink	Frédéric Cattanéo; Shingo Kunieda	Tom Egberink; Michaël Jérémiasz	not held	Stéphane Houdet; Shingo Kunieda	Stefan Olsson; Peter Vikström
2013	Michaël Jérémiasz; Shingo Kunieda	Stéphane Houdet; Shingo Kunieda	Stéphane Houdet; Shingo Kunieda	Michaël Jérémiasz; Maikel Scheffers	Stéphane Houdet; Gordon Reid	not held
2014	Stéphane Houdet; Shingo Kunieda	Joachim Gérard; Stéphane Houdet	Stéphane Houdet; Shingo Kunieda	Stéphane Houdet; Shingo Kunieda	Joachim Gérard; Stéphane Houdet	not held
2015	Stéphane Houdet; Shingo Kunieda	Shingo Kunieda; Gordon Reid	Gustavo Fernández; Nicolas Peifer	Stéphane Houdet; Gordon Reid	Michaël Jérémiasz; Gordon Reid	not held
2016	Stéphane Houdet; Nicolas Peifer	Shingo Kunieda; Gordon Reid	Alfie Hewett; Gordon Reid	not held	Stéphane Houdet; Nicolas Peifer	Stéphane Houdet; Nicolas Peifer
2017	Joachim Gérard; Gordon Reid	Stéphane Houdet; Nicolas Peifer	Alfie Hewett; Gordon Reid	Alfie Hewett; Gordon Reid	Alfie Hewett; Gordon Reid	not held
2018	Stéphane Houdet; Nicolas Peifer	Stéphane Houdet; Nicolas Peifer	Alfie Hewett; Gordon Reid	Alfie Hewett; Gordon Reid	Stéphane Houdet; Nicolas Peifer	not held
2019	Joachim Gérard; Stefan Olsson	Gustavo Fernández; Shingo Kunieda	Joachim Gérard; Stefan Olsson	Alfie Hewett; Gordon Reid	Stéphane Houdet; Nicolas Peifer	not held
2020	Alfie Hewett; Gordon Reid	Alfie Hewett; Gordon Reid	cancelled	Alfie Hewett; Gordon Reid	cancelled	Rescheduled
2021	Alfie Hewett; Gordon Reid	Alfie Hewett; Gordon Reid	Alfie Hewett; Gordon Reid	Alfie Hewett; Gordon Reid	Alfie Hewett; Gordon Reid	Stéphane Houdet; Nicolas Peifer
2022	Alfie Hewett; Gordon Reid	Alfie Hewett; Gordon Reid	Gustavo Fernández; Shingo Kunieda	Martín de la Puente; Nicolas Peifer	Martín de la Puente; Gustavo Fernández	not held
2023	Alfie Hewett; Gordon Reid	Alfie Hewett; Gordon Reid	Alfie Hewett; Gordon Reid	Stéphane Houdet; Takashi Sanada	Alfie Hewett; Gordon Reid	not held
2024	Alfie Hewett; Gordon Reid	Alfie Hewett; Gordon Reid	Alfie Hewett; Gordon Reid	not held	Joachim Gérard; Martín de la Puente	Alfie Hewett; Gordon Reid
2025	Alfie Hewett; Gordon Reid	Alfie Hewett; Gordon Reid	Martín de la Puente; Ruben Spaargaren	Gustavo Fernández; Tokito Oda	Martín de la Puente; Ruben Spaargaren	not held
2026	Gustavo Fernández; Tokito Oda	Alfie Hewett; Gordon Reid	Alfie Hewett; Gordon Reid	Alfie Hewett; Gordon Reid		not held

=== Wheelchair boys' singles ===
Year	Australian Open	French Open	Wimbledon	US Open
2022	not held	not held	not held	Ben Bartram
2023	not held	not held	not held	Dahnon Ward
2024	not held	Maximilian Taucher	not held	Charlie Cooper
2025	Charlie Cooper	Maximilian Taucher	not held	Maximilian Taucher
2026	Alexander Lantermann	Matthew Knoesen	not held	Matthew Knoesen

=== Wheelchair boys' doubles ===
Year	Australian Open	French Open	Wimbledon	US Open
2022	not held	not held	not held	Ben Bartram; Dahnon Ward
2023	not held	not held	not held	Joshua Johns; Dahnon Ward
2024	not held	Ruben Harris; Maximilian Taucher	not held	Ivar van Rijt; Benjamin Wenzel
2025	Luiz Calixto; Charlie Cooper	Charlie Cooper; Maximilian Taucher	not held	Ruben Harris; Maximilian Taucher
2026	Lucas John De Gouveia; Alexander Lantermann	Matthew Knoesen; Alexander Lantermann	not held	Hirofumi Inoue; Matthew Knoesen

== Champions list ==
=== Wheelchair men's singles ===
Rank	Player	Grand Slam					Masters	Paralympics	Total
Rank	Player	Australian Open	French Open	Wimbledon	US Open	Total	Masters	Paralympics	Total
1	Shingo Kunieda	11	8	1	8	28	3	3	34
2	Tokito Oda	2	4	3	1	10	3	1	14
3	Alfie Hewett	2	3	1	5	11	3	0	14
4	Robin Ammerlaan	1	0	0	2	3	6	1	10
5	David Hall	3	0	0	0	3	2	1	6
5	Joachim Gérard	1	0	1	0	2	4	0	6
7	Stéphane Houdet	0	2	0	2	4	1	0	5
7	Gustavo Fernández	2	2	1	0	5	0	0	5
9	Stefan Olsson	0	0	2	0	2	2	0	4
10	Ricky Molier	0	0	0	0	0	2	1	3
10	Maikel Scheffers	1	1	0	0	2	1	0	3
10	Gordon Reid	1	0	1	0	2	0	1	3
13	Randy Snow	0	0	0	0	0	1	1	2
14	Stephen Welch	0	0	0	0	0	1	0	1
14	Laurent Giammartini	0	0	0	0	0	1	0	1
14	Kai Schrameyer	0	0	0	0	0	1	0	1
14	Michaël Jérémiasz	1	0	0	0	1	0	0	1

=== Wheelchair men's doubles ===
Rank	Player	Grand Slam					Masters	Paralympics	Total
Rank	Player	Australian Open	French Open	Wimbledon	US Open	Total	Masters	Paralympics	Total
1	Gordon Reid	7	9	7	7	30	5	1	36
2	Stéphane Houdet	5	7	3	5	20	7	3	30
2	Alfie Hewett	6	7	7	6	26	3	1	30
4	Shingo Kunieda	8	8	4	2	22	1	1	24
5	Michaël Jérémiasz	1	2	3	3	9	4	1	14
6	Nicolas Peifer	2	3	1	2	8	3	2	13
7	Robin Ammerlaan	6	0	3	2	11	0	1	12
8	Maikel Scheffers	1	1	1	2	5	3	0	8
8	Ronald Vink	1	0	3	1	5	3	0	8
10	Martin Legner	3	0	0	0	3	3	0	6
10	Satoshi Saida	1	0	1	1	3	2	1	6
10	Stefan Olsson	1	0	2	1	4	1	1	6
10	Joachim Gérard	2	1	1	0	4	2	0	6
10	Gustavo Fernández	1	1	2	1	5	1	0	6
15	Martín de la Puente	0	0	1	1	2	2	0	4
16	Stephen Welch	0	0	0	0	0	2	1	3
17	Ricky Molier	0	0	0	0	0	1	1	2
17	Jayant Mistry	0	0	1	0	1	1	0	2
17	Tom Egberink	0	0	1	0	1	1	0	2
17	Peter Vikström	0	0	0	0	0	1	1	2
17	Tokito Oda	1	0	0	1	2	0	0	2
22	Brad Parks	0	0	0	0	0	0	1	1
22	Randy Snow	0	0	0	0	0	0	1	1
22	Vance Parmelly	0	0	0	0	0	0	1	1
22	Miroslav Brychta	0	0	0	0	0	1	0	1
22	Kai Schrameyer	0	0	0	0	0	1	0	1
22	Frédéric Cattanéo	0	1	0	0	1	0	0	1
22	Takashi Sanada	0	0	0	1	1	0	0	1
22	Ruben Spaargaren	0	0	1	0	1	0	0	1

=== Wheelchair boys' singles ===
Rank	Player	Australian Open	French Open	Wimbledon	US Open	Total
1	Maximilian Taucher	0	2	0	1	3
2	Charlie Cooper	1	0	0	1	2
2	Matthew Knoesen	0	1	0	1	2
4	Ben Bartram	0	0	0	1	1
4	Alexander Lantermann	1	0	0	0	1
4	Dahnon Ward	0	0	0	1	1

=== Wheelchair boys' doubles ===
Rank	Player	Australian Open	French Open	Wimbledon	US Open	Total
1	Maximilian Taucher	0	2	0	1	3
2	Dahnon Ward	0	0	0	2	2
2	Charlie Cooper	1	1	0	0	2
2	Ruben Harris	0	1	0	1	2
2	Alexander Lantermann	1	1	0	0	2
2	Matthew Knoesen	0	1	0	1	2
7	Ben Bartram	0	0	0	1	1
7	Joshua Johns	0	0	0	1	1
7	Ivar van Rijt	0	0	0	1	1
7	Benjamin Wenzel	0	0	0	1	1
7	Luiz Calixto	1	0	0	0	1
7	Lucas John De Gouveia	1	0	0	0	1
7	Hirofumi Inoue	0	0	0	1	1

== Grand Slam achievements ==
=== Grand Slam ===
Players who held all four Grand Slam titles simultaneously (in a calendar year).

==== Wheelchair men's doubles ====
Player	Australian Open	French Open	Wimbledon	US Open
Stéphane Houdet	2014	2014	2014	2014
Alfie Hewett	2021	2021	2021	2021
Gordon Reid	2021	2021	2021	2021

=== Non-calendar year Grand Slam ===
Players who held all four Grand Slam titles simultaneously (not in a calendar year).

==== Wheelchair men's singles ====
Player	From	To	Streak	Notes
Shingo Kunieda	2021 US Open	2022 Wimbledon	4	
Tokito Oda	2025 French Open	2026 Wimbledon	6	

==== Wheelchair men's doubles ====
Player	From	To	Streak	Notes
Stéphane Houdet	2009 French Open	2010 French Open	5	with Michaël Jérémiasz, Shingo Kunieda and Stefan Olsson.
Shingo Kunieda	2014 Wimbledon	2015 French Open	4	with Stéphane Houdet and Gordon Reid.

=== Career Grand Slam ===
Players who won all four Grand Slam titles over the course of their careers.

- The event at which the Career Grand Slam was completed indicated in **bold**

==== Wheelchair men's singles ====
Player	Australian Open	French Open	Wimbledon	US Open
Shingo Kunieda	2007	2007	**2022**	2007
Alfie Hewett	2023	2017	**2024**	2018
Tokito Oda	2024	2023	2023	**2025**

==== Wheelchair men's doubles ====
===== Individual =====
Player	Australian Open	French Open	Wimbledon	US Open
Shingo Kunieda	2007	**2008**	2006	2007
Stéphane Houdet	**2010**	2007	2009	2009
Maikel Scheffers	2011	2008	**2011**	2010
Michaël Jérémiasz	**2013**	2007	2005	2005
Stéphane Houdet (2)	**2014**	2009	2013	2011
Shingo Kunieda (2)	2008	2010	2013	**2014**
Stéphane Houdet (3)	**2015**	2010	2014	2014
Nicolas Peifer	**2016**	2011	2015	2011
Gordon Reid	**2017**	2015	2016	2015
Gordon Reid (2)	**2020**	2016	2017	2017
Alfie Hewett	2020	**2020**	2016	2017
Gordon Reid (3)	**2021**	2020	2018	2018
Alfie Hewett (2)	2021	**2021**	2017	2018
Gordon Reid (4)	**2022**	2021	2021	2019
Alfie Hewett (3)	2022	**2022**	2018	2019
Alfie Hewett (4)	2023	**2023**	2021	2020
Gordon Reid (5)	2023	2022	**2023**	2020
Alfie Hewett (5)	2024	**2024**	2023	2021
Gordon Reid (6)	2024	2023	**2024**	2021
Gustavo Fernández	**2026**	2019	2015	2025
Alfie Hewett (6)	2025	2025	2024	**2026**
Gordon Reid (7)	2025	2024	2026	**2026**

===== Team =====
Player	Australian Open	French Open	Wimbledon	US Open
Shingo Kunieda; Stéphane Houdet	2010	2010	2013	**2014**
Alfie Hewett; Gordon Reid	2020	**2020**	2016	2017
Alfie Hewett; Gordon Reid (2)	2021	**2021**	2017	2018
Alfie Hewett; Gordon Reid (3)	2022	**2022**	2018	2019
Alfie Hewett; Gordon Reid (4)	2023	**2023**	2021	2020
Alfie Hewett; Gordon Reid (5)	2024	**2024**	2023	2021
Alfie Hewett; Gordon Reid (6)	2025	2025	2024	**2026**

=== Career Golden Slam ===
Players who won all four Grand Slam titles and the Paralympic gold medal over the course of their careers.

- The event at which the Career Golden Slam was completed indicated in **bold**

==== Wheelchair men's singles ====
Player	Australian Open	French Open	Wimbledon	US Open	Paralympics
Shingo Kunieda	2007	2007	**2022**	2007	2008
Tokito Oda	2024	2023	2023	**2025**	2024

==== Wheelchair men's doubles ====
===== Individual =====
Player	Australian Open	French Open	Wimbledon	US Open	Paralympics
Shingo Kunieda	2007	**2008**	2006	2007	2004
Stéphane Houdet	**2010**	2007	2009	2009	2008
Michaël Jérémiasz	**2013**	2007	2005	2005	2008
Stéphane Houdet (2)	2014	2009	2013	2011	**2016**
Nicolas Peifer	2016	2011	2015	2011	**2016**
Stéphane Houdet (3)	2015	2010	2014	2014	**2021**
Gordon Reid	2017	2015	2016	2015	**2024**
Alfie Hewett	2020	2020	2016	2017	**2024**

===== Team =====
Player	Australian Open	French Open	Wimbledon	US Open	Paralympics
Alfie Hewett; Gordon Reid	2020	2020	2016	2017	**2024**

=== Career Super Slam ===
Players who won all four Grand Slam titles, the Paralympic gold medal and the year-end championship over the course of their careers.

- The event at which the Career Super Slam was completed indicated in **bold**

==== Wheelchair men's singles ====
Player	Australian Open	French Open	Wimbledon	US Open	Paralympics	Year-end
Shingo Kunieda	2007	2007	**2022**	2007	2008	2012
Tokito Oda	2024	2023	2023	**2025**	2024	2022

==== Wheelchair men's doubles ====
===== Individual =====
Player	Australian Open	French Open	Wimbledon	US Open	Paralympics	Year-end
Stéphane Houdet	**2010**	2007	2009	2009	2008	2007
Shingo Kunieda	2007	2008	2006	2007	2004	**2012**
Michaël Jérémiasz	**2013**	2007	2005	2005	2008	2005
Stéphane Houdet (2)	2014	2009	2013	2011	**2016**	2012
Nicolas Peifer	2016	2011	2015	2011	2016	**2016**
Stéphane Houdet (3)	2015	2010	2014	2014	**2021**	2013
Gordon Reid	2017	2015	2016	2015	**2024**	2013
Alfie Hewett	2020	2020	2016	2017	**2024**	2017

===== Team =====
Player	Australian Open	French Open	Wimbledon	US Open	Paralympics	Year-end
Alfie Hewett; Gordon Reid	2020	2020	2016	2017	**2024**	2017

== Multiple titles in a season ==
=== Three titles in a single season ===
Note: players who won 4 titles in a season are not included here.

Key
**W**	F	SF	QF	#R	RR	Q#	DNQ	A	NH

(W) winner; (F) finalist; (SF) semifinalist; (QF) quarterfinalist; (#R) rounds 4, 3, 2, 1; (RR) round-robin stage; (Q#) qualification round; (DNQ) did not qualify; (A) absent; (NH) not held; (SR) strike rate (events won / competed); (W–L) win–loss record.

==== Wheelchair men's singles ====
Player	Year	Australian Open	French Open	Wimbledon	US Open
Shingo Kunieda	2007	**W**	W	NH	**W**
Shingo Kunieda (2)	2009	**W**	W	NH	**W**
Shingo Kunieda (3)	2010	**W**	W	NH	**W**
Shingo Kunieda (4)	2014	**W**	W	NH	**W**
Shingo Kunieda (5)	2015	**W**	W	NH	**W**
Gustavo Fernández	2019	**W**	W	**W**	SF
Shingo Kunieda (6)	2022	**W**	W	**W**	F
Tokito Oda	2025	F	W	**W**	**W**

==== Wheelchair men's doubles ====
Player	Year	Australian Open	French Open	Wimbledon	US Open
Stéphane Houdet	2009	SF	**W**	**W**	**W**
Shingo Kunieda	2013	**W**	**W**	**W**	SF
Shingo Kunieda (2)	2014	**W**	SF	**W**	**W**
Gordon Reid	2017	**W**	F	**W**	**W**
Gordon Reid (2)	2020	**W**	**W**	NH	**W**
Alfie Hewett	2020	**W**	**W**	NH	**W**
Gordon Reid (3)	2023	**W**	**W**	**W**	SF
Alfie Hewett (2)	2023	**W**	**W**	**W**	SF
Gordon Reid (4)	2024	**W**	**W**	**W**	NH
Alfie Hewett (3)	2024	**W**	**W**	**W**	NH
Gordon Reid (5)	2026	SF	**W**	**W**	**W**
Alfie Hewett (4)	2026	SF	**W**	**W**	**W**

=== Surface Slam ===
Players who won Grand Slam titles on clay, grass and hard courts in a calendar year.

==== Wheelchair men's singles ====
Player	Year	Clay court slam	Hard court slam	Grass court slam
Gustavo Fernández	2019	French Open	Australian Open	Wimbledon
Shingo Kunieda	2022	French Open	Australian Open	Wimbledon
Tokito Oda	2025	French Open	US Open	Wimbledon
Tokito Oda (2)	2026	French Open	Australian Open	Wimbledon

==== Wheelchair men's doubles ====
Player	Year	Clay court slam	Hard court slam	Grass court slam
Stéphane Houdet	2009	French Open	US Open	Wimbledon
Shingo Kunieda	2013	French Open	Australian Open	Wimbledon
Stéphane Houdet (2)	2014	French Open	Australian Open	Wimbledon
Stéphane Houdet (2)	2014	French Open	US Open	Wimbledon
Gordon Reid	2021	French Open	Australian Open	Wimbledon
Alfie Hewett	2021	French Open	US Open	Wimbledon
Gordon Reid (2)	2023	French Open	Australian Open	Wimbledon
Alfie Hewett (2)	2023	French Open	Australian Open	Wimbledon
Gordon Reid (3)	2024	French Open	Australian Open	Wimbledon
Alfie Hewett (3)	2024	French Open	Australian Open	Wimbledon
Gordon Reid (4)	2026	French Open	US Open	Wimbledon
Alfie Hewett (4)	2026	French Open	US Open	Wimbledon

=== Career Surface Slam ===
Players who won Grand Slam titles on clay, grass and hard courts iover the course of their careers.

- The event at which the Career Surface Slam was completed indicated in **bold**

==== Wheelchair men's singles ====
Player	Clay court slam	Hard court slam	Grass court slam
Gustavo Fernández	2016 French Open	2017 Australian Open	**2019 Wimbledon**
Shingo Kunieda	2007 French Open	2007 Australian Open	**2022 Wimbledon**
Tokito Oda	2023 French Open	**2024 Australian Open**	2023 Wimbledon
Alfie Hewett	2017 French Open	2018 US Open	**2024 Wimbledon**
Tokito Oda (2)	2024 French Open	**2025 US Open**	2025 Wimbledon
Tokito Oda (3)	2025 French Open	2026 Australian Open	**2026 Wimbledon**

==== Wheelchair men's doubles ====
===== Individual =====
Player	Clay court slam	Hard court slam	Grass court slam
Michaël Jérémiasz	**2007 French Open**	2005 US Open	2005 Wimbledon
Shingo Kunieda	**2008 French Open**	2007 Australian Open	2006 Wimbledon
Michaël Jérémiasz (2)	2009 French Open	2006 US Open	**2009 Wimbledon**
Stéphane Houdet	2007 French Open	**2009 US Open**	2009 Wimbledon
Maikel Scheffers	2008 French Open	2010 Australian Open	**2011 Wimbledon**
Stéphane Houdet (2)	2009 French Open	2010 Australian Open	**2013 Wimbledon**
Shingo Kunieda (2)	2010 French Open	2007 US Open	2013 Wimbledon
Shingo Kunieda (3)	2011 French Open	2008 Australian Open	**2014 Wimbledon**
Stéphane Houdet (3)	2010 French Open	2011 US Open	**2014 Wimbledon**
Nicolas Peifer	2011 French Open	2011 US Open	**2015 Wimbledon**
Gordon Reid	2015 French Open	2015 US Open	**2016 Wimbledon**
Gordon Reid (2)	2016 French Open	2017 Australian Open	**2017 Wimbledon**
Joachim Gérard	2014 French Open	2017 Australian Open	**2019 Wimbledon**
Alfie Hewett	**2020 French Open**	2017 US Open	2016 Wimbledon
Gordon Reid (3)	**2020 French Open**	2017 US Open	2018 Wimbledon
Alfie Hewett (2)	**2021 French Open**	2018 US Open	2017 Wimbledon
Gordon Reid (4)	2021 French Open	2018 US Open	**2021 Wimbledon**
Alfie Hewett (3)	**2022 French Open**	2019 US Open	2018 Wimbledon
Shingo Kunieda (4)	2012 French Open	2009 Australian Open	**2022 Wimbledon**
Alfie Hewett (4)	**2023 French Open**	2020 Australian Open	2021 Wimbledon
Gordon Reid (5)	2022 French Open	2019 US Open	**2023 Wimbledon**
Alfie Hewett (5)	**2024 French Open**	2020 US Open	2023 Wimbledon
Gordon Reid (6)	2023 French Open	2020 Australian Open	**2024 Wimbledon**
Alfie Hewett (6)	**2025 French Open**	2021 Australian Open	2024 Wimbledon
Gustavo Fernández	2019 French Open	**2025 US Open**	2015 Wimbledon
Gordon Reid (7)	2023 French Open	2020 US Open	**2026 Wimbledon**
Alfie Hewett (7)	2026 French Open	2021 US Open	**2026 Wimbledon**

===== Team =====
Player	Clay court slam	Hard court slam	Grass court slam
Stéphane Houdet; Shingo Kunieda	2008 French Open	2010 Australian Open	**2013 Wimbledon**
Stéphane Houdet; Shingo Kunieda (2)	2013 French Open	2014 Australian Open	**2014 Wimbledon**
Gordon Reid; Alfie Hewett	**2020 French Open**	2017 US Open	2016 Wimbledon
Gordon Reid; Alfie Hewett (2)	**2021 French Open**	2018 US Open	2017 Wimbledon
Gordon Reid; Alfie Hewett (3)	**2022 French Open**	2019 US Open	2018 Wimbledon
Gordon Reid; Alfie Hewett (4)	**2023 French Open**	2020 Australian Open	2021 Wimbledon
Gordon Reid; Alfie Hewett (5)	**2024 French Open**	2020 US Open	2023 Wimbledon
Gordon Reid; Alfie Hewett (6)	**2025 French Open**	2021 Australian Open	2024 Wimbledon
Gordon Reid; Alfie Hewett (7)	2026 French Open	2021 US Open	**2026 Wimbledon**

=== Channel Slam ===
Players who won the French Open-Wimbledon double.

==== Wheelchair men's singles ====
Year	Player
2019	Gustavo Fernández
2022	Shingo Kunieda
2023	Tokito Oda
2025	Tokito Oda (2)
2026	Tokito Oda (3)

==== Wheelchair men's doubles ====
Year	Player
2009	Michaël Jérémiasz
2009	Stéphane Houdet
2013	Shingo Kunieda
2013	Stéphane Houdet (2)
2014	Stéphane Houdet (3)
2016	Gordon Reid
2021	Alfie Hewett
2021	Gordon Reid (2)
2023	Alfie Hewett (2)
2023	Gordon Reid (3)
2024	Alfie Hewett (3)
2024	Gordon Reid (4)
2026	Alfie Hewett (4)
2026	Gordon Reid (5)

== See also ==
- List of women's wheelchair tennis champions
- List of quad wheelchair tennis champions
