= Wheelchair tennis at the 2012 Summer Paralympics – Men's singles =

Wheelchair tennis – Men's singles at the XIV Paralympic Games
- Paralympic wheelchair tennis
- Venue: Eton Manor, London
- Dates: 1–8 September 2012
- Competitors: 64

Medalists
1st place, gold medalist(s)		Shingo Kunieda	Japan
2nd place, silver medalist(s)		Stéphane Houdet	France
3rd place, bronze medalist(s)		Ronald Vink	Netherlands

Men's singles
- Wheelchair tennis at the 2012 Summer Paralympics

Events
Singles	men	women	quad
Doubles	men	women	quad
← 2008 ·	Summer Paralympics	· 2016 →

The men's singles wheelchair tennis competition at the 2012 Summer Paralympics in London was held from 1 September to 8 September.

Defending gold medalist Shingo Kunieda of Japan defeated Stéphane Houdet of France in the final, 6–4, 6–2 to win the gold medal in men's singles wheelchair tennis at the 2012 London Paralympics. In the bronze-medal match, the Netherlands' Ronald Vink defeated compatriot Maikel Scheffers.

== Calendar ==
September	1	2	3	4	5	6	7	8
Round	Round of 64	Round of 32	None	Round of 16	Quarterfinals	Semifinals	None	Bronze; Final

== Seeds ==
1. Stéphane Houdet (FRA) (silver medalist)
2. Shingo Kunieda (JPN) (gold medalist)
3. Maikel Scheffers (NED) (fourth place)
4. Ronald Vink (NED) (bronze medalist)
5. Gustavo Fernandez (ARG) (quarterfinals)
6. Stefan Olsson (SWE) (round of 16)
7. Michaël Jérémiasz (FRA) (quarterfinals)
8. Nicolas Peifer (FRA) (round of 16)
9. Gordon Reid (GBR) (quarterfinals)
10. Robin Ammerlaan (NED) (round of 16)
11. Joachim Gérard (BEL) (quarterfinals)
12. Takashi Sanada (JPN) (round of 16)
13. Satoshi Saida (JPN) (round of 32)
14. Tom Egberink (NED) (round of 16)
15. Martin Legner (AUT) (round of 32)
16. Frédéric Cattanéo (FRA) (round of 16)

== Draw ==
=== Key ===
- INV = Bipartite invitation
- ITF = ITF place
- ALT = Alternative
- r = Retired
- w/o = Walkover

=== Finals ===
Quarterfinals
1	Stéphane Houdet (FRA)	6	1	6
5	Gustavo Fernandez (ARG)	1	6	1
3	Maikel Scheffers (NED)	6	6
9	Gordon Reid (GBR)	3	3
11	Joachim Gérard (BEL)	6	6	3
4	Ronald Vink (NED)	7	2	6
7	Michaël Jérémiasz (FRA)	0	2
2	Shingo Kunieda (JPN)	6	6

Semifinals
1	Stéphane Houdet (FRA)	6	6
3	Maikel Scheffers (NED)	3	2
4	Ronald Vink (NED)	2	2
2	Shingo Kunieda (JPN)	6	6

Final (gold-medal match)
1	Stéphane Houdet (FRA)	4	2
2	Shingo Kunieda (JPN)	6	6
Bronze-medal match
3	Maikel Scheffers (NED)	6	6	4
4	Ronald Vink (NED)	4	7	6

=== Top half ===
==== Section 1 ====
Round of 64
1	S Houdet (FRA)	6	6
S Khlongrua (THA)	1	0
M Pommê (BRA)	6	6
A Batycki (POL)	4	2
F Tur Blanch (ESP)	4	2
B Weekes (AUS)	6	6
M McCarroll (GBR)	4	3
14	T Egberink (NED)	6	6
12	T Sanada (JPN)	6	6
S Baldwin (USA)	1	2
R Mendez (CHI)	6	4	2
T Mossier (AUT)	3	6	6
P Bedard (CAN)	7	7
L Boukartacha (MAR)	5	2
F Mazzei (ITA)	0	0
5	G Fernandez (ARG)	6	6

Round of 32
1	S Houdet (FRA)	6	6
M Pommê (BRA)	2	1
B Weekes (AUS)	2	2
14	T Egberink (NED)	6	6
12	T Sanada (JPN)	4	6	6
T Mossier (AUT)	6	3	3
P Bedard (CAN)	0	0
5	G Fernandez (ARG)	6	6

Round of 16
1	S Houdet (FRA)	6	6
14	T Egberink (NED)	2	2
12	T Sanada (JPN)	6	4	1
5	G Fernandez (ARG)	3	6	6

Quarterfinals
1	S Houdet (FRA)	6	1	6
5	G Fernandez (ARG)	1	6	1

==== Section 2 ====
Round of 64
3	M Scheffers (NED)	6	6
T Kruszelnicki (POL)	3	1
N Yablong (USA)	2	3
W Yusuf (NGR)	6	6
M Hamdan (IRQ)	1	0
E Maripa (RSA)	6	6
G Dissanayaka (SRI)	4	0
16	F Cattanéo (FRA)	6	6
9	G Reid (GBR)	6	6
T Miki (JPN)	1	2
D Alves Rodrigues (BRA)	7	5	6
E Oquendo Barrios (COL)	6	7	4
HG Lee (KOR)	6	6
D Pellegrina (SUI)	1	1
M Denayer (BEL)	0	0
6	S Olsson (SWE)	6	6

Round of 32
3	M Scheffers (NED)	6	6
W Yusuf (NGR)	2	1
E Maripa (RSA)	1	4
16	F Cattanéo (FRA)	6	6
9	G Reid (GBR)	6	6
D Alves Rodrigues (BRA)	0	0
HG Lee (KOR)	1	2
6	S Olsson (SWE)	6	6

Round of 16
3	M Scheffers (NED)	6	6
16	F Cattanéo (FRA)	0	2
9	G Reid (GBR)	7	6
6	S Olsson (SWE)	5	4

Quarterfinals
3	M Scheffers (NED)	6	6
9	G Reid (GBR)	3	3

=== Bottom half ===
==== Section 3 ====
Round of 64
8	N Peifer (FRA)	6	6
A Adewale (NGR)	0	1
H Mamipour (IRI)	2	1
P Jaroszewski (POL)	6	6
S Mathonsi (RSA)	2	7	1
S Welch (USA)	6	6	6
S Santos (BRA)	3	2
11	J Gérard (BEL)	6	6
13	S Saida (JPN)	6	6
A Jewitt (GBR)	2	0
P Vikstrom (SWE)	4	3
A Kellerman (AUS)	6	6
D Caverzaschi Arzola (ESP)	6	6
U Rahakaruna (SRI)	1	2
S Merngprom (THA)	1	2
4	R Vink (NED)	6	6

Round of 32
8	N Peifer (FRA)	6	6
P Jaroszewski (POL)	1	1
S Welch (USA)	6	2
11	J Gérard (BEL)	7	6
13	S Saida (JPN)	3	2
A Kellerman (AUS)	6	6
D Caverzaschi Arzola (ESP)	1	0
4	R Vink (NED)	6	6

Round of 16
8	N Peifer (FRA)	3	6	5
11	J Gérard (BEL)	6	2	7
A Kellerman (AUS)	3	2
4	R Vink (NED)	6	6

Quarterfinals
11	J Gérard (BEL)	6	6	3
4	R Vink (NED)	7	2	6

==== Section 4 ====
Round of 64
7	M Jérémiasz (FRA)	6	6
D Perez (CHI)	0	0
J Rydberg (USA)	6	6	6
A Ledesma (ARG)	7	3	1
K Fabisiak (POL)	3	5
L Farkas (HUN)	6	7
D Chabrecek (SVK)	2	1
10	R Ammerlaan (NED)	6	6
15	M Legner (AUT)	6	6
S-h Oh (KOR)	1	1
J Dembe (CAN)	2	2
D Phillipson (GBR)	6	6
Y Avanthey (SUI)	4	3
N Mharakurwa (ZIM)	6	6
R Medeiros Gomes (BRA)	0	0
2	S Kunieda (JPN)	6	6

Round of 32
7	M Jérémiasz (FRA)	7	6
J Rydberg (USA)	6	1
L Farkas (HUN)	2	1
10	R Ammerlaan (NED)	6	6
15	M Legner (AUT)	3	2
D Phillipson (GBR)	6	6
N Mharakurwa (ZIM)	0	0
2	S Kunieda (JPN)	6	6

Round of 16
7	M Jérémiasz (FRA)	4	6	6
10	R Ammerlaan (NED)	6	0	3
D Phillipson (GBR)	0	2
2	S Kunieda (JPN)	6	6

Quarterfinals
7	M Jérémiasz (FRA)	0	2
2	S Kunieda (JPN)	6	6
