= Wheelchair tennis at the 2008 Summer Paralympics – Men's singles =

Wheelchair tennis – Men's singles at the XIII Paralympic Games
- Paralympic wheelchair tennis
- Venue: Olympic Green Tennis Centre
- Dates: 8–15 September 2008
- Competitors: 64

Medalists
1st place, gold medalist(s)		Shingo Kunieda	Japan
2nd place, silver medalist(s)		Robin Ammerlaan	Netherlands
3rd place, bronze medalist(s)		Maikel Scheffers	Netherlands

Men's singles
- Wheelchair tennis at the 2008 Summer Paralympics

Events
Singles	men	women	quad
Doubles	men	women	quad
← 2004 ·	Summer Paralympics	· 2012 →

The men's singles wheelchair tennis competition at the 2008 Summer Paralympics in Beijing was held from 8 September to 15 September at the Olympic Green Tennis Centre. The DecoTurf surface rendered the event a hardcourt competition.

Japan's Shingo Kunieda defeated the defending gold medalist Robin Ammerlaan of the Netherlands in the final, 6–3, 6–0 to win the gold medal in men's singles wheelchair tennis at the 2008 Beijing Paralympics. In the bronze medal match, the Netherlands' Maikel Scheffers defeated compatriot Ronald Vink.

== Medalists ==
Gold	Shingo Kunieda; Japan
Silver	Robin Ammerlaan; Netherlands
Bronze	Maikel Scheffers; Netherlands

Source: www.paralympic.org

== Calendar ==
September	8	9	10	11	12	13	14	15
Start time	11:00	11:00	11:00	11:00	13:00	13:00	13:00	13:00
	Round of 64	Round of 32	Round of 32	Round of 16	Quarterfinals	Semifinals	Bronze	Final

== Seeds ==
1. Shingo Kunieda (JPN) (champion, gold medalist)
2. Robin Ammerlaan (NED) (final, silver medalist)
3. Michaël Jeremiasz (FRA) (quarterfinals)
4. Stéphane Houdet (FRA) (quarterfinals)
5. Tadeusz Kruszelnicki (POL) (third round)
6. Maikel Scheffers (NED) (semifinals, bronze medalist)
7. Stefan Olsson (SWE) (quarterfinals)
8. Martin Legner (AUT) (third round)
9. Satoshi Saida (JPN) (quarterfinals)
10. Nicolas Peifer (FRA) (third round)
11. Ronald Vink (NED) (semifinals, fourth place)
12. Ben Weekes (AUS) (first round)
13. n/a
14. Peter Wikstrom (SWE) (third round)
15. Joachim Gérard (BEL) (third round)
16. Lahcen Majdi (FRA) (SecondRound)
17. Jon Rydberg (USA) (third round)

== Draw ==
=== Key ===
- INV = Bipartite invitation
- IP = ITF place
- ALT = Alternate
- r = Retired
- w/o = Walkover

=== Finals ===
Quarterfinals
1	Shingo Kunieda (JPN)	6	6
7	Stefan Olsson (SWE)	0	1
3	Michaël Jeremiasz (FRA)	3	3
6	Maikel Scheffers (NED)	6	6
11	Ronald Vink (NED)	6	6
4	Stéphane Houdet (FRA)	2	1
9	Satoshi Saida (JPN)	4	2
2	Robin Ammerlaan (NED)	6	6

Semifinals
1	Shingo Kunieda (JPN)	6	6
6	Maikel Scheffers (NED)	1	1
11	Ronald Vink (NED)	5	6	6
2	Robin Ammerlaan (NED)	7	4	7

Final (gold medal match)
1	Shingo Kunieda (JPN)	6	6
2	Robin Ammerlaan (NED)	3	0
Bronze medal match
6	Maikel Scheffers (NED)	6	6
11	Ronald Vink (NED)	3	1

=== Top half ===
==== Section 1 ====
Round of 64
1	S Kunieda (JPN)	6	6
A Jewitt (GBR)	1	0
E Stuurman (NED)	6	6
INV	Y Shi (CHN)	4	4
L Carter (CAN)	4	3
J Felix (SVK)	6	6
ALT	H Pfundner (AUT)	2	0
17	J Rydberg (USA)	6	6
10	N Peifer (FRA)	6	6
S Kruamai (THA)	2	2
ALT	S Mathonsi (RSA)	2	1
A Batycki (POL)	6	6
MK Okur (TUR)	5	3
T Tenhunen (FIN)	7	6
W Yusuf (NGR)	2	1
7	S Olsson (SWE)	6	6

Round of 32
1	S Kunieda (JPN)	6	6
INV	E Stuurman (NED)	2	1
J Felix (SVK)	4	3
17	J Rydberg (USA)	6	6
10	N Peifer (FRA)	6	6
A Batycki (POL)	1	3
T Tenhunen (FIN)	1	1
7	S Olsson (SWE)	6	6

Round of 16
1	S Kunieda (JPN)	6	6
17	J Rydberg (USA)	1	1
10	N Peifer (FRA)	6	0
7	S Olsson (SWE)	7	6

Quarterfinals
1	S Kunieda (JPN)	6	6
7	S Olsson (SWE)	0	1

==== Section 2 ====
Round of 64
3	M Jeremiasz (FRA)	6	6
R Mendez (CHI)	1	0
M Gatelli (ITA)	6	6	6
INV	K Simpson (GBR)	1	7	4
M Pommê (BRA)	1	3
L Hinson (USA)	6	6
M Gergely (SVK)	1	0
15	J Gerard (BEL)	6	6
12	B Weekes (AUS)	5	4
Y Fujimoto (JPN)	7	6
INV	D Pellegrina (SUI)	1	6	6
INV	A Illobre (ESP)	6	2	2
H-g Lee (KOR)	6	6
L Shevchik (RUS)	1	1
L Farkas (HUN)	3	4
6	M Scheffers (NED)	6	6

Round of 32
3	M Jeremiasz (FRA)	6	6
M Gatelli (ITA)	0	2
L Hinson (USA)	2	0
15	J Gerard (BEL)	6	6
Y Fujimoto (JPN)	6	3	6
INV	D Pellegrina (SUI)	4	6	4
H-g Lee (KOR)	2	1
6	M Scheffers (NED)	6	6

Round of 16
3	M Jeremiasz (FRA)	6	6
15	J Gerard (BEL)	4	1
Y Fujimoto (JPN)	1	1
6	M Scheffers (NED)	6	6

Quarterfinals
3	M Jeremiasz (FRA)	3	3
6	M Scheffers (NED)	6	6

=== Bottom half ===
==== Section 3 ====
Round of 64
8	M Legner (AUT)	6	6
T Ikenoya (JPN)	1	0
D Phillipson (GBR)	6	6
INV	Y Mathieu (CAN)	3	1
F Tur (ESP)	6	6
INV	C Prohaszka (HUN)	1	1
P Moran (USA)	0	1
11	R Vink (NED)	6	6
14	P Wikstrom (SWE)	6	6
P Jaroszewski (POL)	1	0
K Schmaeh (SUI)	3	4
M Dobbie (AUS)	6	6
INV	S Khulongrua (THA)	6	6	6
F Mazzei (ITA)	7	2	3
D Chabrecek (SVK)	2	0
4	S Houdet (FRA)	6	6

Round of 32
8	M Legner (AUT)	6	6
D Phillipson (GBR)	0	0
F Tur (ESP)	1	0
11	R Vink (NED)	6	6
14	P Wikstrom (SWE)	6	6
M Dobbie (AUS)	1	3
INV	S Khulongrua (THA)	1	0
4	S Houdet (FRA)	6	6

Round of 16
8	M Legner (AUT)	4	3
11	R Vink (NED)	6	6
14	P Wikstrom (SWE)	0	3
4	S Houdet (FRA)	6	6

Quarterfinals
11	R Vink (NED)	6	6
4	S Houdet (FRA)	2	1

==== Section 4 ====
Round of 64
5	T Kruszelnicki (POL)	6	6
S-h Oh (KOR)	2	4
INV	E Oquendo (COL)	5	6	4
INV	B Li (CHN)	7	3	6
T Mossier (AUT)	6	5
C Santos (BRA)	7	7
G Camusso (ARG)	0	0
9	S Saida (JPN)	6	6
16	L Majdi (FRA)	6	6
ALT	G Lazaridis (GRE)	0	0
F Cayulef (CHI)	1	1
S Welch (USA)	6	6
INV	U Rajakaruna (SRI)	6	6
INV	K Kammersgaard (DEN)	1	1
G Reid (GBR)	3	0
2	R Ammerlaan (NED)	6	6

Round of 32
5	T Kruszelnicki (POL)	6	6
INV	Li B (CHN)	1	4
C Santos (BRA)	0	1
9	S Saida (JPN)	6	6
16	L Majdi (FRA)	1	0
S Welch (USA)	6	6
INV	U Rajakaruna (SRI)	0	0
2	R Ammerlaan (NED)	6	6

Round of 16
5	T Kruszelnicki (POL)	2	3
9	S Saida (JPN)	6	6
S Welch (USA)	2	3
2	R Ammerlaan (NED)	6	6

Quarterfinals
9	S Saida (JPN)	4	2
2	R Ammerlaan (NED)	6	6
