= Wheelchair tennis at the 2012 Summer Paralympics – Men's doubles =

Wheelchair tennis – Men's doubles at the XIV Paralympic Games
- Paralympic wheelchair tennis
- Venue: Eton Manor, London
- Dates: 2–7 September 2012

Medalists
1st place, gold medalist(s)		Stefan Olsson; Peter Vikström	Sweden
2nd place, silver medalist(s)		Frédéric Cattanéo; Nicolas Peifer	France
3rd place, bronze medalist(s)		Stéphane Houdet; Michaël Jérémiasz	France

Men's doubles
- Wheelchair tennis at the 2012 Summer Paralympics

Events
Singles	men	women	quad
Doubles	men	women	quad
← 2008 ·	Summer Paralympics	· 2016 →

The men's doubles wheelchair tennis competition at the 2012 Summer Paralympics in London was held from 2 September to 7 September.

== Calendar ==
September	2	3	4	5	6	7
Round	Round of 32	Round of 16	None	Quarterfinals	Semifinals	Bronze; Final

== Seeds ==
1. Stéphane Houdet / Michaël Jérémiasz (FRA) (bronze medalists)
2. Robin Ammerlaan / Ronald Vink (NED) (fourth place)
3. Tom Egberink / Maikel Scheffers (NED) (quarterfinals)
4. Frédéric Cattanéo / Nicolas Peifer (FRA) (silver medalists)
5. Shingo Kunieda / Satoshi Saida (JPN) (quarterfinals)
6. Stefan Olsson / Peter Vikström (SWE) (gold medalists)
7. Marc McCarroll / Gordon Reid (GBR) (quarterfinals)
8. Takuya Miki / Takashi Sanada (JPN) (quarterfinals)

== Draw ==
=== Key ===
- INV = Bipartite invitation
- ITF = ITF place
- ALT = Alternative
- r = Retired
- w/o = Walkover

=== Finals ===
Semifinals
1	Stéphane Houdet (FRA); Michaël Jérémiasz (FRA)	1	6
6	Stefan Olsson (SWE); Peter Vikström (SWE)	6	7
4	Frédéric Cattanéo (FRA); Nicolas Peifer (FRA)	6	6
2	Robin Ammerlaan (NED); Ronald Vink (NED)	3	2

Final (gold-medal match)
6	Stefan Olsson (SWE); Peter Vikström (SWE)	6	6
4	Frédéric Cattanéo (FRA); Nicolas Peifer (FRA)	1	2
Bronze-medal match
1	Stéphane Houdet (FRA); Michaël Jérémiasz (FRA)	6	6
2	Robin Ammerlaan (NED); Ronald Vink (NED)	0	0

==== Top half ====
First round
A Jewitt (GBR); D Phillipson (GBR)	6	6
Y Avanthey (SUI); D Pellegrina (SUI)	3	2
A Batycki (POL); K Fabisiak (POL)	2	1
A Kellerman (AUS); B Weekes (AUS)	6	6
G Fernandez (ARG); A Ledesma (ARG)	3	1
5	S Kunieda (JPN); S Saida (JPN)	6	6
D Alves Rodrigues (BRA); R Medeiros Gomes (BRA)	4	6
HG Lee (KOR); S-h Oh (KOR)	6	7
A Adewale (NGR); W Yusuf (NGR)	1	6	4
D Caverzaschi Arzola (ESP); F Tur Blanch (ESP)	6	4	6
S Baldwin (USA); N Yablong (USA)	0	1
6	S Olsson (SWE); P Vikström (SWE)	6	6

Second round
1	S Houdet (FRA); M Jérémiasz (FRA)	6	6
A Jewitt (GBR); D Phillipson (GBR)	0	2
A Kellerman (AUS); B Weekes (AUS)	2	3
5	S Kunieda (JPN); S Saida (JPN)	6	6
3	T Egberink (NED); M Scheffers (NED)	6	6
HG Lee (KOR); S-h Oh (KOR)	3	2
D Caverzaschi Arzola (ESP); F Tur Blanch (ESP)	1	0
6	S Olsson (SWE); P Vikström (SWE)	6	6

Quarterfinals
1	S Houdet (FRA); M Jérémiasz (FRA)	6	6
5	S Kunieda (JPN); S Saida (JPN)	3	1
3	T Egberink (NED); M Scheffers (NED)	3	2
6	S Olsson (SWE); P Vikström (SWE)	6	6

Semifinals
1	S Houdet (FRA); M Jérémiasz (FRA)	1	6
6	S Olsson (SWE); P Vikström (SWE)	6	7

==== Bottom half ====
First round
7	M McCarroll (GBR); G Reid (GBR)	6	6
P Bedard (CAN); J Dembe (CAN)	3	1
E Maripa (RSA); S Mathonsi (RSA)	2	3
M Denayer (BEL); J Gérard (BEL)	6	6
M Legner (AUT); T Mossier (AUT)	6	7
R Mendez (CHI); D Pérez (CHI)	3	5
8	T Miki (JPN); T Sanada (JPN)	6	6
G Dissanayaka (SRI); U Rahajaruna (SRI)	0	1
S Khlongrua (THA); S Merngprom (THA)	7	2	6
P Jaroszewski (POL); T Kruszelnicki (POL)	6	6	2
J Rydberg (USA); S Welch (USA)	6	3	6
M Pommê (BRA); C Santos (BRA)	1	6	7

Second round
7	M McCarroll (GBR); G Reid (GBR)	6	6
M Denayer (BEL); J Gérard (BEL)	4	3
M Legner (AUT); T Mossier (AUT)	0	2
4	F Cattanéo (FRA); N Peifer (FRA)	6	6
8	T Miki (JPN); T Sanada (JPN)	7	7
S Khlongrua (THA); S Merngprom (THA)	5	5
M Pommê (BRA); C Santos (BRA)	3	0
2	R Ammerlaan (NED); R Vink (NED)	6	6

Quarterfinals
7	M McCarroll (GBR); G Reid (GBR)	6	4
4	F Cattanéo (FRA); N Peifer (FRA)	7	6
8	T Miki (JPN); T Sanada (JPN)	6	2	3
2	R Ammerlaan (NED); R Vink (NED)	1	6	6

Semifinals
4	F Cattanéo (FRA); N Peifer (FRA)	6	6
2	R Ammerlaan (NED); R Vink (NED)	3	2
