= Wheelchair tennis at the 2008 Summer Paralympics – Men's doubles =

Wheelchair tennis – Men's doubles at the XIII Paralympic Games
- Paralympic wheelchair tennis
- Venue: Olympic Green Tennis Centre
- Dates: 8–15 September 2008

Medalists
1st place, gold medalist(s)		Stéphane Houdet; Michaël Jérémiasz	France
2nd place, silver medalist(s)		Stefan Olsson; Peter Wikstrom	Sweden
3rd place, bronze medalist(s)		Shingo Kunieda; Satoshi Saida	Japan

Men's doubles
- Wheelchair tennis at the 2008 Summer Paralympics

Events
Singles	men	women	quad
Doubles	men	women	quad
← 2004 ·	Summer Paralympics	· 2012 →

The men's doubles wheelchair tennis competition at the 2008 Summer Paralympics in Beijing was held from 10 September to 15 September at the Olympic Green Tennis Centre. The DecoTurf surface rendered the event a hardcourt competition.

== Medalists ==
Gold	Stéphane Houdet/Michaël Jérémiasz; France
Silver	Stefan Olsson/Peter Wikstrom; Sweden
Bronze	Shingo Kunieda/Satoshi Saida; Japan

== Calendar ==
September	10	11	12	13	14	15
Round	Round of 32	Round of 16	Quarterfinals	Semifinals	Bronze	Final

== Seeds ==
1. Shingo Kunieda / Satoshi Saida (JPN) (semifinals, bronze medalists)
2. Stéphane Houdet / Michaël Jérémiasz (FRA) (champions, gold medalists)
3. Maikel Scheffers / Ronald Vink (NED) (semifinals, fourth place)
4. Stefan Olsson / Peter Wikstrom (SWE) (final, silver medalists)
5. Piotr Jaroszewski / Tadeusz Kruszelnicki (POL) (quarterfinals)
6. Lahcen Majdi / Nicolas Peifer (FRA) (second round)
7. Robin Ammerlaan / Eric Stuurman (NED) (quarterfinals)
8. Lee Ha-Gel / Oh Sang-ho (KOR) (quarterfinals)

== Draw ==
=== Key ===
- INV = bipartite invitation
- IP = ITF place
- ALT = alternate
- r = retired
- w/o = walkover

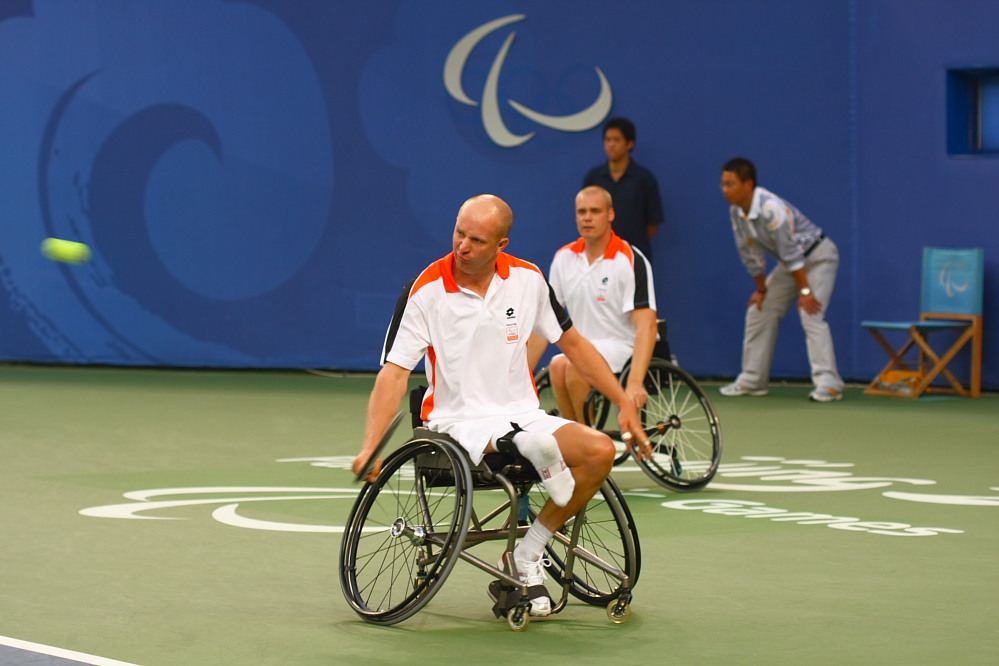
Maikel Scheffers and Ronald Vink of the Netherlands took the fourth place.

=== Finals ===
Semifinals
1	Shingo Kunieda (JPN); Satoshi Saida (JPN)	6	6	2
4	Stefan Olsson (SWE); Peter Wikstrom (SWE)	7	3	6
3	Maikel Scheffers (NED); Ronald Vink (NED)	3	1
2	Stéphane Houdet (FRA); Michaël Jérémiasz (FRA)	6	6

Final (gold medal match)
4	Stefan Olsson (SWE); Peter Wikstrom (SWE)	1	6
2	Stéphane Houdet (FRA); Michaël Jérémiasz (FRA)	6	7
Bronze medal match
1	Shingo Kunieda (JPN); Satoshi Saida (JPN)	3	6	6
3	Maikel Scheffers (NED); Ronald Vink (NED)	6	0	2

==== Top half ====
Round of 32
A Illobre (ESP); F Tur (ESP)	6	6
L Farkas (HUN); C Prohaszka (HUN)	2	2
M Legner (AUT); T Mossier (AUT)	6	6
M Dobbie (AUS); B Weekes (AUS)	4	1
L Hinson (USA); P Moran (USA)	7	3	6
L Carter (CAN); Y Mathieu (CAN)	6	6	4
D Phillipson (GBR); G Reid (GBR)	2	2
J Felix (SVK); M Gergely (SVK)	6	6

Round of 16
1	S Kunieda (JPN); S Saida (JPN)	6	6
A Illobre (ESP); F Tur (ESP)	1	1
M Legner (AUT); T Mossier (AUT)	6	6
6	L Majdi (FRA); N Peifer (FRA)	3	4
4	S Olsson (SWE); P Wikstrom (SWE)	6	6
L Hinson (USA); P Moran (USA)	1	4
J Felix (SVK); M Gergely (SVK)	2	2
7	R Ammerlaan (NED); E Stuurman (NED)	6	6

Quarterfinals
1	S Kunieda (JPN); S Saida (JPN)	6	6
M Legner (AUT); T Mossier (AUT)	2	1
4	S Olsson (SWE); P Wikstrom (SWE)	7	6
7	R Ammerlaan (NED); E Stuurman (NED)	6	4

Semifinals
1	S Kunieda (JPN); S Saida (JPN)	6	6	2
4	S Olsson (SWE); P Wikstrom (SWE)	7	3	6

==== Bottom half ====
Round of 32
M Gatelli (ITA); F Mazzei (ITA)	6	6
A Jewitt (GBR); K Simpson (GBR)	4	4
J Rydberg (USA); S Welch (USA)	6	6	6
B Li (CHN); Y Shi (CHN)	4	7	1
8	HG Lee (KOR); S-h Oh (KOR)	6	6
D Pellegrina (SUI); K Schmaeh (SUI)	0	1
S Khulongrua (THA); S Kruamai (THA)	6	6
F Cayulef (CHI); R Mendez (CHI)	0	2
M Pommê (BRA); C Santos (BRA)	2	7	1
Y Fujimoto (JPN); T Ikenoya (JPN)	6	5	6

Round of 16
5	P Jaroszewski (POL); T Kruszelnicki (POL)	6	6
M Gatelli (ITA); F Mazzei (ITA)	0	0
J Rydberg (USA); S Welch (USA)	3	1
3	M Scheffers (NED); R Vink (NED)	6	6
8	HG Lee (KOR); S-h Oh (KOR)	6	6
S Khulongrua (THA); S Kruamai (THA)	2	3
Y Fujimoto (JPN); T Ikenoya (JPN)	2	2
2	S Houdet (FRA); M Jeremiasz (FRA)	6	6

Quarterfinals
5	P Jaroszewski (POL); T Kruszelnicki (POL)	0	1
3	M Scheffers (NED); R Vink (NED)	6	6
8	HG Lee (KOR); S-h Oh (KOR)	0	0
2	S Houdet (FRA); M Jeremiasz (FRA)	6	6

Semifinals
3	M Scheffers (NED); R Vink (NED)	3	1
2	S Houdet (FRA); M Jeremiasz (FRA)	6	6
