= Wheelchair tennis at the 2004 Summer Paralympics – Men's doubles =

Wheelchair tennis – Men's doubles at the XII Paralympic Games
- Paralympic wheelchair tennis
- Venue: Athens Olympic Tennis Centre
- Dates: 19–26 September 2004

Medalists
1st place, gold medalist(s)		Shingo Kunieda; Satoshi Saida	Japan
2nd place, silver medalist(s)		Michaël Jérémiasz; Lahcen Majdi	France
3rd place, bronze medalist(s)		Anthony Bonaccurso; David Hall	Australia

Men's doubles
- Wheelchair tennis at the 2004 Summer Paralympics

Events
Singles	men	women	quad
Doubles	men	women	quad
← 2000 ·	Summer Paralympics	· 2008 →

The men's doubles wheelchair tennis competition at the 2004 Summer Paralympics in Athens was held from 19 September to 26 September at the Athens Olympic Tennis Centre.

== Draw ==
=== Key ===
- INV = Bipartite invitation
- IP = ITF place
- ALT = Alternate
- r = Retired
- w/o = Walkover

=== Finals ===
Semifinals
Shingo Kunieda (JPN); Satoshi Saida (JPN)	4	6	7
Anthony Bonaccurso (AUS); David Hall (AUS)	6	4	6
Robin Ammerlaan (NED); Eric Stuurman (NED)	2	2
Michaël Jérémiasz (FRA); Lahcen Majdi (FRA)	6	6

Final (gold medal match)
Shingo Kunieda (JPN); Satoshi Saida (JPN)	6	6
Michaël Jérémiasz (FRA); Lahcen Majdi (FRA)	1	2
Bronze medal match
Anthony Bonaccurso (AUS); David Hall (AUS)	6	6	6
Robin Ammerlaan (NED); Eric Stuurman (NED)	4	7	4

==== Top half ====
Round of 32
M Kumarasiri (SRI); B Silva (SRI)	1	1
A Batycki (POL); J Kulik (POL)	6	6
C Santos (BRA); M Pommê (BRA)	6	6
D Chabrecek (SVK); J Felix (SVK)	4	2
L Fischer (FRA); R Harel (FRA)	6	6
L Farkas (HUN); C Prohaszka (HUN)	4	3
S Kruamai (THA); W Peem Mee (THA)	6	6
A Peinsith (AUT); S Krieghofer (AUT)	2	3

Round of 16
S Kunieda (JPN); S Saida (JPN)	6	6
A Batycki (POL); J Kulik (POL)	0	0
C Santos (BRA); M Pommê (BRA)	2	2
S Hatt (GBR); J Mistry (GBR)	6	6
S Welch (USA); J Greer (USA)	6	6
L Fischer (FRA); R Harel (FRA)	1	3
S Kruamai (THA); W Peem Mee (THA)	1	3
A Bonaccurso (AUS); D Hall (AUS)	6	6

Quarterfinals
S Kunieda (JPN); S Saida (JPN)	6	6
S Hatt (GBR); J Mistry (GBR)	1	1
S Welch (USA); J Greer (USA)	4	3
A Bonaccurso (AUS); D Hall (AUS)	6	6

Semifinals
S Kunieda (JPN); S Saida (JPN)	4	6	7
A Bonaccurso (AUS); D Hall (AUS)	6	4	6

==== Bottom half ====
Round of 32
P Jaroszewski (POL); T Kruszelnicki (POL)	6	6
F Tur (ESP); C Mira (ESP)	0	1
M Gatelli (ITA); F Mazzei (ITA)	7	6	6
H Nakano (JPN); R To (JPN)	6	7	3
HG Lee (KOR); DJ Kwak (KOR)	6	6
D Gardner (GBR); K Plowman (GBR)	2	1
M Legner (AUT); H Baumgartner (AUT)	6	6
A Hubbard (RSA); J Victor (RSA)	0	1
S Olsson (SWE); P Wikstrom (SWE)	6	6
A Sugiharto (INA); Y Onasie (INA)	0	0
M Erni (SUI); D Pellegrina (SUI)	0	3
L Quintero (USA); J Rydberg (USA)	6	6

Round of 16
P Jaroszewski (POL); T Kruszelnicki (POL)	6	6
M Gatelli (ITA); F Mazzei (ITA)	2	2
HG Lee (KOR); DJ Kwak (KOR)	3	1
R Ammerlaan (NED); E Stuurman (NED)	6	6
M Legner (AUT); H Baumgartner (AUT)	4	4
S Olsson (SWE); P Wikstrom (SWE)	6	6
L Quintero (USA); J Rydberg (USA)	2	4
M Jérémiasz (FRA); L Majdi (FRA)	6	6

Quarterfinals
P Jaroszewski (POL); T Kruszelnicki (POL)	2	3
R Ammerlaan (NED); E Stuurman (NED)	6	6
S Olsson (SWE); P Wikstrom (SWE)	1	2
M Jérémiasz (FRA); L Majdi (FRA)	6	6

Semifinals
R Ammerlaan (NED); E Stuurman (NED)	2	2
M Jérémiasz (FRA); L Majdi (FRA)	6	6
