= Wheelchair tennis at the 2004 Summer Paralympics – Men's singles =

Wheelchair tennis – Men's singles at the XII Paralympic Games
- Paralympic wheelchair tennis
- Venue: Athens Olympic Tennis Centre
- Dates: 19–26 September 2004
- Competitors: 62

Medalists
1st place, gold medalist(s)		Robin Ammerlaan	Netherlands
2nd place, silver medalist(s)		David Hall	Australia
3rd place, bronze medalist(s)		Michaël Jérémiasz	France

Men's singles
- Wheelchair tennis at the 2004 Summer Paralympics

Events
Singles	men	women	quad
Doubles	men	women	quad
- Summer Paralympics

The men's singles wheelchair tennis competition at the 2004 Summer Paralympics in Athens was held from 19 September to 26 September at the Athens Olympic Tennis Centre.

The Netherlands' Robin Ammerlaan defeated the defending gold medalist David Hall of Australia in the final, 6–2, 6–1 to win the gold medal in men's singles wheelchair tennis at the 2004 Athens Paralympics. In the bronze medal match, France's Michaël Jérémiasz defeated the United States' Stephen Welch.

== Draw ==
=== Key ===
- INV = Bipartite invitation
- IP = ITF place
- ALT = Alternate
- r = Retired
- w/o = Walkover

=== Finals ===
Quarterfinals
Robin Ammerlaan (NED)	6	3	7
Satoshi Saida (JPN)	4	6	6
Stephen Welch (USA)	6	6
Martin Legner (AUT)	2	3
Tadeusz Kruszelnicki (POL)	5	1
Michaël Jérémiasz (FRA)	7	6
Shingo Kunieda (JPN)	2	6	4
David Hall (AUS)	6	0	6

Semifinals
Robin Ammerlaan (NED)	7	1	6
Stephen Welch (USA)	5	6	4
Michaël Jérémiasz (FRA)	1	1
David Hall (AUS)	6	6

Final (gold medal match)
Robin Ammerlaan (NED)	6	6
David Hall (AUS)	2	1
Bronze medal match
Stephen Welch (USA)	2	4
Michaël Jérémiasz (FRA)	6	6

=== Top half ===
==== Section 1 ====
Round of 64
R Ammerlaan (NED)	6	6
N Larsson (SWE)	0	0
B Weekes (AUS)	6	6
J Victor (RSA)	1	2
L Shevchick (RUS)	6	6
A Sugiharto (INA)	2	1
J Greer (USA)	2	5
M Lahcen (FRA)	6	6
J Mistry (GBR)	5	6	6
J Felix (FRA)	7	3	4
H Baumgartner (AUT)	6	6
B Silva (SRI)	2	0
D Pellegrina (SUI)	1	7	0
M Gatelli (ITA)	6	5	6
A Batyck (POL)	0	0
S Saida (JPN)	6	6

Round of 32
R Ammerlaan (NED)	6	6
B Weekes (AUS)	0	0
L Shevchick (RUS)	6	1	1
M Lahcen (FRA)	4	6	6
J Mistry (GBR)	6	7	6
H Baumgartner (AUT)	7	5	1
M Gatelli (ITA)	0	2
S Saida (JPN)	6	6

Round of 16
R Ammerlaan (NED)	6	6
M Lahcen (FRA)	0	1
J Mistry (GBR)	2	1
S Saida (JPN)	6	6

Quarterfinals
R Ammerlaan (NED)	6	3	7
S Saida (JPN)	4	6	6

==== Section 2 ====
Round of 64
S Welch (USA)	6	6
R To (JPN)	1	0
P Jaroszewski (POL)	6	6
X Liu (CHN)	1	0
A Bonaccurso (AUS)	6	6
K Vazouras (GRE)	1	0
Z Musa (MAS)	0	0
HG Lee (KOR)	6	6
K Schrameyer (GER)	6	6
C Santos (BRA)	1	2
L Farkas (HUN)	6	6
S Hatt (GBR)	3	3
F Tur (ESP)	6	6
L Fischer (FRA)	2	2
W Peem Mee (THA)	2	0
M Legner (AUT)	6	6

Round of 32
S Welch (USA)	6	6
P Jaroszewski (POL)	3	0
A Bonaccurso (AUS)	6	6
HG Lee (KOR)	2	3
K Schrameyer (GER)	7	6	3
L Farkas (HUN)	5	7	6
F Tur (ESP)	1	1
M Legner (AUT)	6	6

Round of 16
S Welch (USA)	6	6
A Bonaccurso (AUS)	1	3
L Farkas (HUN)	0	1
M Legner (AUT)	6	6

Quarterfinals
S Welch (USA)	6	6
M Legner (AUT)	2	3

=== Bottom half ===
==== Section 3 ====
Round of 64
T Kruszelnicki (POL)	6	’6
C Prohaszka (HUN)	0	0
D Chabrecek (SVK)	3	3
D Gardner (GBR)	6	6
C Mira (ESP)	6	6
G Barnes (NZL)	0	4
H Nakano (JPN)	3	1
E Stuurman (NED)	6	6
M Brychta (CZE)	6	6
A Hubbard (RSA)	0	0
M Kumarasiri (SRI)	1	0
S Olsson (SWE)	6	6
L Quintero (USA)	7	6
S Kruamai (THA)	6	1
A Peinsith (AUT)
M Jérémiasz (FRA)	w/o

Round of 32
T Kruszelnicki (POL)	6	6
D Gardner (GBR)	0	0
C Mira (ESP)	2	0
E Stuurman (NED)	6	6
M Brychta (CZE)	7	6
S Olsson (SWE)	5	2
L Quintero (USA)	1	0
M Jérémiasz (FRA)	6	6

Round of 16
T Kruszelnicki (POL)	7	0	6
E Stuurman (NED)	5	6	4
M Brychta (CZE)	3	2
M Jérémiasz (FRA)	6	6

Quarterfinals
T Kruszelnicki (POL)	5	1
M Jérémiasz (FRA)	7	6

==== Section 4 ====
Round of 64
S Kunieda (JPN)	6	6
Y Onasie (INA)	0	0
K Plowman (GBR)	6	2	7
M Erni (SUI)	0	6	6
S Krieghofer (AUT)	3	1
P Wikstrom (SWE)	6	6
J Rydberg (USA)	6	6
M Pommê (BRA)	3	3
R Harel (FRA)	6	6
DJ Kwak (KOR)	2	1
R Mendez (CHI)	4	6	6
YL Chen (TPE)	6	4	0
O Diaz (ARG)	0	1
D Hall (AUS)	6	6

Round of 32
S Kunieda (JPN)	6	6
J Kulik (POL)	0	2
K Plowman (GBR)	2	0
P Wikstrom (SWE)	6	6
J Rydberg (USA)	6	6
R Harel (FRA)	4	1
R Mendez (CHI)	0	2
D Hall (AUS)	6	6

Round of 16
S Kunieda (JPN)	6	4	6
P Wikstrom (SWE)	3	6	3
J Rydberg (USA)	0	3
D Hall (AUS)	6	6

Quarterfinals
S Kunieda (JPN)	2	6	4
D Hall (AUS)	6	0	6
