= Ronald Vink =

Dutch wheelchair tennis player

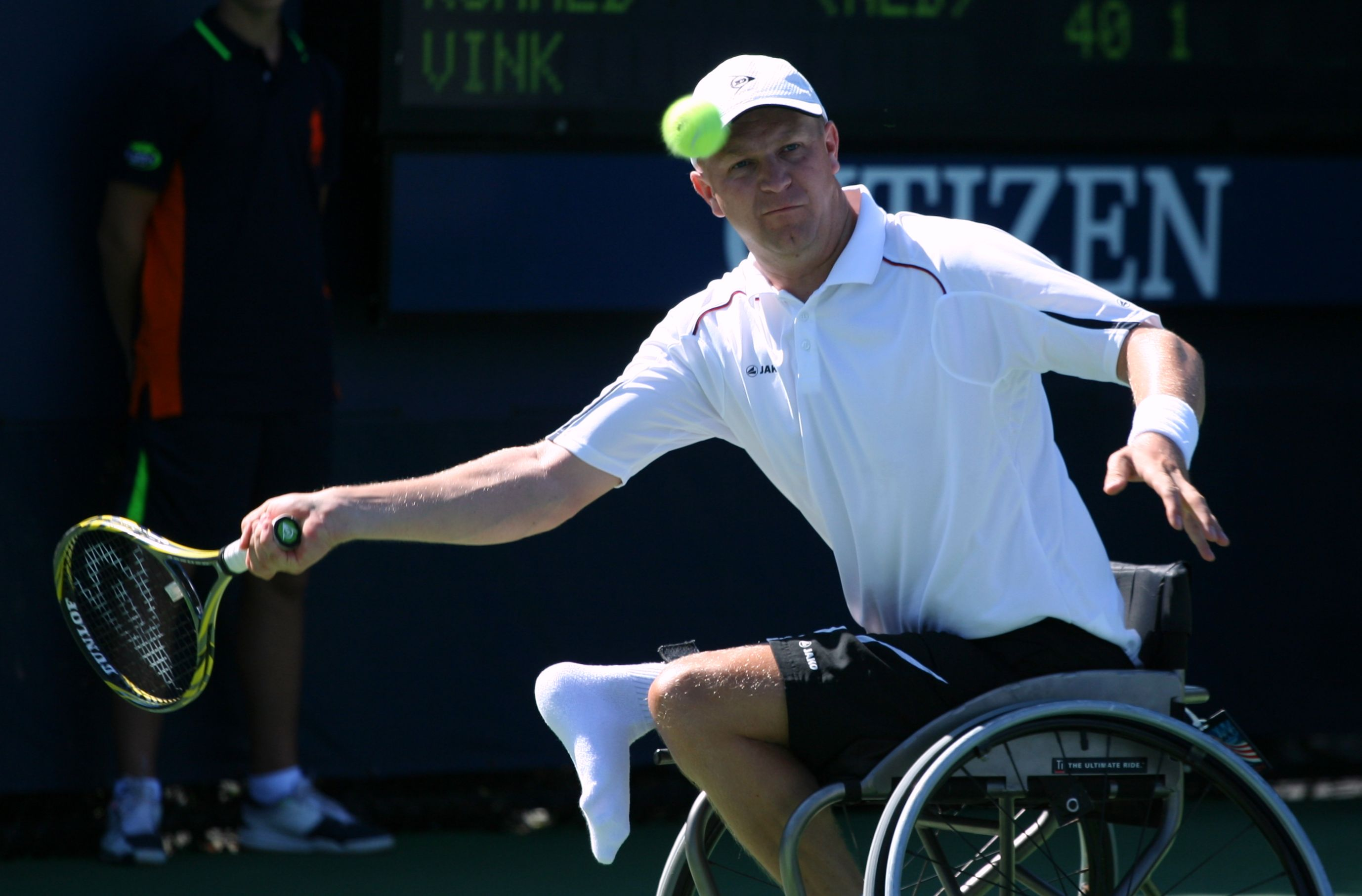
- Vink at the 2011 US Open, New York
- Country (sports): Netherlands
- Residence: De Rijp, Netherlands
- Born: 21 April 1976 (age 48); West-Graftdijk, Netherlands
- Turned pro: 2000
- Plays: Right Handed
- Official website: http://www.ronaldvink.nl

Singles
- Highest ranking: No. 4 (6 September 2010)

Grand Slam singles results
- Australian Open: SF (2013)
- French Open: SF (2008, 2012)
- US Open: SF (2005, 2006, 2011)

Other tournaments
- Paralympic Games: Bronze Medal (2012)

Doubles
- Career titles: 39
- Highest ranking: No. 1 (30 January 2012)

Grand Slam doubles results
- Australian Open: W (2012)
- French Open: F (2008, 2010, 2013)
- Wimbledon: W (2007, 2008, 2011)
- US Open: W (2010)

Other doubles tournaments
- Masters Doubles: W (2006, 2009, 2010)
- Paralympic Games: 4th (2008)

Ronald Vink (born 21 April 1976) is a professional wheelchair tennis player from the Netherlands. He specializes in doubles but also plays singles.

== Grand Slam performances ==
Vink has reached grand slam wheelchair doubles finals, capturing his first title at the 2007 Wimbledon Championships with compatriot Robin Ammerlaan. In 2008, he successfully defended his Wimbledon Wheelchair title by defeating the French duo of Stéphane Houdet and Nicoles Peifer. In 2011 he won for the third time the final with his partner Maikel Scheffers.

In singles, he has had less successes. Vink has never captured a singles title nor has he reached a final. His best effort came at the 2008 French Open, when he reached the semifinals.

== Grand Slam Doubles Wheelchair finals ==
=== Wins (5) ===
Year	Championship	Partnering	Opponents in Final	Score in Final
2007	Wimbledon	(Netherlands) Robin Ammerlaan	(Japan) Shingo Kunieda (Japan) Satoshi Saida	4–6, 7–5, 6–2
2008	Wimbledon	(Netherlands) Robin Ammerlaan	(France) Stéphane Houdet (France) Nicolas Peifer	6–7^{(6)}, 6–1, 6–3
2010	US Open	(Netherlands) Maikel Scheffers	(France) Nicolas Peifer (United States) Jon Rydberg	6–0, 6–0
2011	Wimbledon	(Netherlands) Maikel Scheffers	(France) Stéphane Houdet (France) Michaël Jeremiasz	7–5, 6–2
2012	Australian Open	(Netherlands) Robin Ammerlaan	(France) Stéphane Houdet (France) Nicolas Peifer	6–2, 4–6, 6–1

=== Runners-up (5) ===
Year	Championship	Partnering	Opponents in Final	Score in Final
2007	Australian Open	(Netherlands) Maikel Scheffers	(Japan) Shingo Kunieda (Netherlands) Robin Ammerlaan	6–2, 6–0
2008	Australian Open	(Netherlands) Robin Ammerlaan	(Japan) Shingo Kunieda (Japan) Satoshi Saida	6–4, 6–3
2008	French Open	(Netherlands) Robin Ammerlaan	(Japan) Shingo Kunieda (Netherlands) Maikel Scheffers	6–2, 7–5
2009	US Open	(Netherlands) Maikel Scheffers	(France) Stéphane Houdet (Sweden) Stefan Olsson	6–4, 4–6, 6–4
2011	US Open	(Netherlands) Maikel Scheffers	(France) Stéphane Houdet (France) Nicolas Peifer	6–3, 6–1

== Paralympic performances ==
He represented the Netherlands at the Paralympics in Beijing 2008 and London 2012.

=== Beijing 2008 ===
He competed in singles and doubles. In both events he made it to the semifinals but lost there and lost again in the bronze medal match.

=== London 2012 ===
He competed in the singles and doubles events. In the semifinals of the singles event he lost from Shingo Kunieda but won the bronze medal match from Maikel Scheffers. In the bronze medal match of the doubles event he lost with his partner Robin Ammerlaan from the French Stéphane Houdet and Michaël Jeremiasz.

== Performance timelines ==
Key
W	F	SF	QF	#R	RR	Q#	DNQ	A	NH

(W) winner; (F) finalist; (SF) semifinalist; (QF) quarterfinalist; (#R) rounds 4, 3, 2, 1; (RR) round-robin stage; (Q#) qualification round; (DNQ) did not qualify; (A) absent; (NH) not held; (SR) strike rate (events won / competed); (W–L) win–loss record.

=== Wheelchair singles ===
Tournament	2005	2006	2007	2008	2009	2010	2011	2012	2013	SR	W–L
Grand Slam tournaments
Australian Open	?	?	QF	QF	A	A	QF	QF	SF	0 / 5	3–5
French Open	?	?	A	SF	A	QF	QF	SF	QF	0 / 5	1–5
US Open	SF	SF	QF	NH	QF	QF	SF	NH	QF	0 / 7	1–7
Win–loss	?–?	?–?	0–2	1–2	0–1	0–2	1–3			0 / 16	5–16

=== Wheelchair doubles ===
Tournament	2006	2007	2008	2009	2010	2011	2012	2013	2014	SR	W–L
Grand Slam tournaments
Australian Open	?	F	F	A	A	F	W	SF	A	1 / 5	3–3
French Open	?	A	F	A	F	SF	SF	F	A	0 / 4	3–3
Wimbledon	?	W	W	F	SF	W	F	F	F	3 / 8	10–5
US Open	SF	F	NH	F	W	F	NH	SF	A	1 / 6	5–3
Win–loss	?–?	4–2	4–2	2–2	4–2	5–3	?–?	?–?	?–?	4 / 19	21–15
