= Stefan Olsson =

Swedish wheelchair tennis player

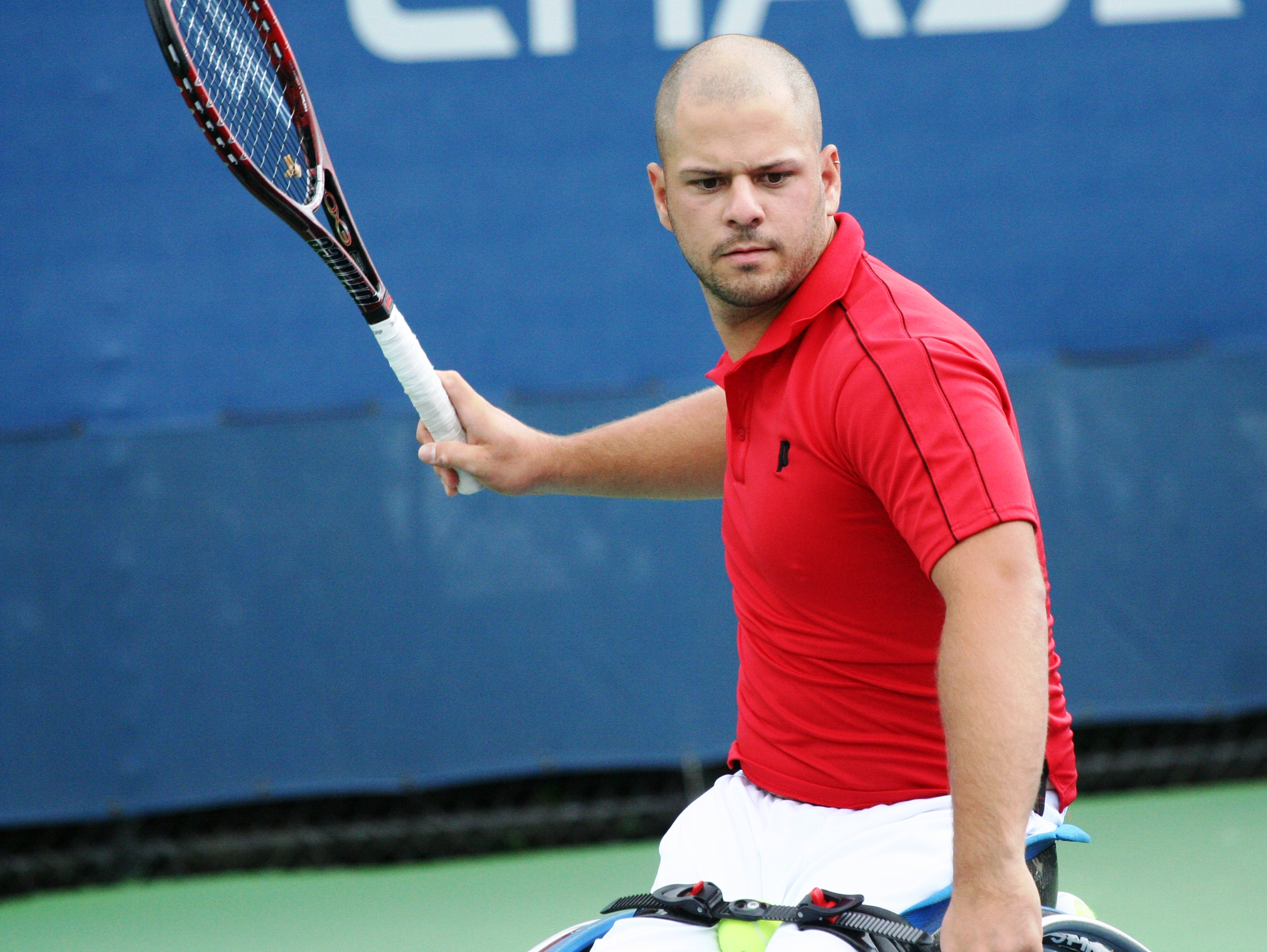
- Stefan Olsson at the 2010 US Open
- Country (sports): Sweden
- Residence: Falun, Sweden
- Born: 24 April 1987 (age 38) Falun, Sweden
- Retired: 2021

Singles
- Highest ranking: No. 2 (14 February 2011)

Grand Slam singles results
- Australian Open: F (2019)
- French Open: F (2010)
- Wimbledon: W (2017, 2018)
- US Open: SF (2009)

Other tournaments
- Masters: W (2008, 2010)
- Paralympic Games: QF (2008, 2016)

Doubles
- Highest ranking: No. 4 (18 May 2009)

Grand Slam doubles results
- Australian Open: W (2019)
- French Open: F (2010, 2011, 2012, 2016, 2018)
- Wimbledon: W (2010, 2019)
- US Open: W (2009)

Other doubles tournaments
- Masters Doubles: W (2008)
- Paralympic Games: Gold Medal (2012)
Medal record
Men's wheelchair tennis
Representing Sweden
Paralympic Games
Gold medal – first place	2012 London	Men's doubles
Silver medal – second place	2008 Beijing	Men's doubles
- Last updated on: 9 July 2018.

Stefan Olsson (born 24 April 1987) is a former Swedish wheelchair tennis player. Olsson was a ranked world number two singles player. He has won four Grand Slam titles in doubles, the 2009 US Open, the 2010 and 2019 Wimbledon titles and the 2019 Australian Open. He has also won two in singles, at Wimbledon in 2017 and 2018. Olsson has won both the singles and doubles events at the year end Masters and is a Paralympic champion in men's doubles. He started playing tennis at the age of seven.

He competed in five Paralympics, the last of which was the Tokyo 2020 Paralympics, which was held in 2021. He retired after the Tokyo Paralympics.

== Career statistics ==
Key
W	F	SF	QF	#R	RR	Q#	P#	DNQ	A	Z#	PO	G	S	B	NMS	NTI	P	NH

(W) winner; (F) finalist; (SF) semifinalist; (QF) quarterfinalist; (#R) rounds 4, 3, 2, 1; (RR) round-robin stage; (Q#) qualification round; (P#) preliminary round; (DNQ) did not qualify; (A) absent; (Z#) Davis/Fed Cup Zonal Group (with number indication) or (PO) play-off; (G) gold, (S) silver or (B) bronze Olympic/Paralympic medal; (NMS) not a Masters tournament; (NTI) not a Tier I tournament; (P) postponed; (NH) not held; (SR) strike rate (events won / competed); (W–L) win–loss record.
To avoid confusion and double counting, these charts are updated at the conclusion of a tournament or when the player's participation has ended.

=== Wheelchair singles ===
Tournament	2008	2009	2010	2011	2012	2013	2014	2015	2016	2017	2018	2019	2020	2021	SR	W–L	Win %
Australian Open	A	QF	QF	SF	SF	SF	A	A	A	A	SF	F	A	A	0 / 7	6–7	46%
French Open	QF	QF	F	QF	SF	QF	A	A	QF	QF	QF	QF	A	A	0 / 10	3–10	23%
Wimbledon	Not held								F	W	W	SF	NH	A	2 / 4	9–2	82%
US Open	NH	SF	QF	QF	NH	A	A	A	NH	QF	QF	QF	A	A	0 / 6	1–6	14%
Win–loss	0–1	1–3	2–3	1–3	2–2	1–2	0–0	0–0	2–2	3–2	4–3	3–4	0–0	0–0	2 / 26	19–24	43%

=== Wheelchair doubles ===
Tournament	2008	2009	2010	2011	2012	2013	2014	2015	2016	2017	2018	2019	2020	2021	SR	W–L	Win %
Australian Open	A	F	SF	SF	SF	F	A	A	A	A	SF	W	A	A	1 / 7	4–6	40%
French Open	SF	SF	F	F	F	SF	A	A	F	SF	F	SF	A	A	0 / 10	5–10	33%
Wimbledon	A	SF	W	SF	A	A	A	A	SF	SF	F	W	NH	A	2 / 7	5–5	50%
US Open	NH	W	SF	SF	NH	A	A	A	NH	SF	SF	SF	A	A	1 / 6	2–5	29%
Win–loss	0–1	3–3	3–3	1–4	1–2	1–2	0–0	0–0	1–2	0–3	2–4	2–2	0–0	0–0	4 / 30	16–26	38%

==== Grand Slam Finals ====
Wheelchair singles: 5 (2 titles, 3 runner-ups)

Result	Year	Tournament	Surface	Opponent	Score
Loss	2010	French Open	Clay	(Japan) Shingo Kunieda	4–6, 0–6
Loss	2016	Wimbledon	Grass	(United Kingdom) Gordon Reid	1–6, 4–6
Win	2017	Wimbledon	Grass	(Argentina) Gustavo Fernández	7−5, 3−6, 7−5
Win	2018	Wimbledon	Grass	(Argentina) Gustavo Fernández	6–2, 0–6, 6–3
Loss	2019	Australian Open	Hard	(Argentina) Gustavo Fernández	5–7, 3–6

Wheelchair doubles: 12 (4 titles, 8 runner-ups)

Result	Year	Championship	Surface	Partner	Opponents	Score
Loss	2009	Australian Open	Hard	(Netherlands) Maikel Scheffers	(Netherlands) Robin Ammerlaan (Japan) Shingo Kunieda	5–7, 1–6
Win	2009	US Open	Hard	(France) Stéphane Houdet	(Netherlands) Maikel Scheffers (Netherlands) Ronald Vink	6–4, 4–6, 6–4
Loss	2010	French Open	Clay	(Netherlands) Robin Ammerlaan	(France) Stéphane Houdet (Japan) Shingo Kunieda	0–6, 7–5, [8–10]
Win	2010	Wimbledon	Grass	(Netherlands) Robin Ammerlaan	(France) Stéphane Houdet (Japan) Shingo Kunieda	6–4, 7–6^{(7–4)}
Loss	2011	French Open	Clay	(Netherlands) Robin Ammerlaan	(Japan) Shingo Kunieda (France) Nicolas Peifer	2–6, 3–6
Loss	2012	French Open	Clay	(France) Michael Jeremiasz	(France) Frédéric Cattaneo (Japan) Shingo Kunieda	6–3, 6–7, [6–10]
Loss	2013	Australian Open	Hard	(Australia) Adam Kellerman	(France) Michael Jeremiasz (Japan) Shingo Kunieda	0–6, 1–6
Loss	2016	French Open	Clay	(France) Michael Jeremiasz	(Japan) Shingo Kunieda (United Kingdom) Gordon Reid	3–6, 2–6
Loss	2018	French Open	Clay	(France) Frederic Cattaneo	(France) Stéphane Houdet (France) Nicolas Peifer	1–6, 6–7^{(5–7)}
Loss	2018	Wimbledon	Grass	(Belgium) Joachim Gérard	(United Kingdom) Alfie Hewett (United Kingdom) Gordon Reid	1–6, 4–6
Win	2019	Australian Open	Hard	(Belgium) Joachim Gérard	(France) Stéphane Houdet (Australia) Ben Weekes	6–3, 6–2
Win	2019	Wimbledon	Grass	(Belgium) Joachim Gérard	(United Kingdom) Alfie Hewett (United Kingdom) Gordon Reid	6–4, 6–2
