= David Hall (Australian tennis) =

Australian wheelchair tennis player

David Hall OAM
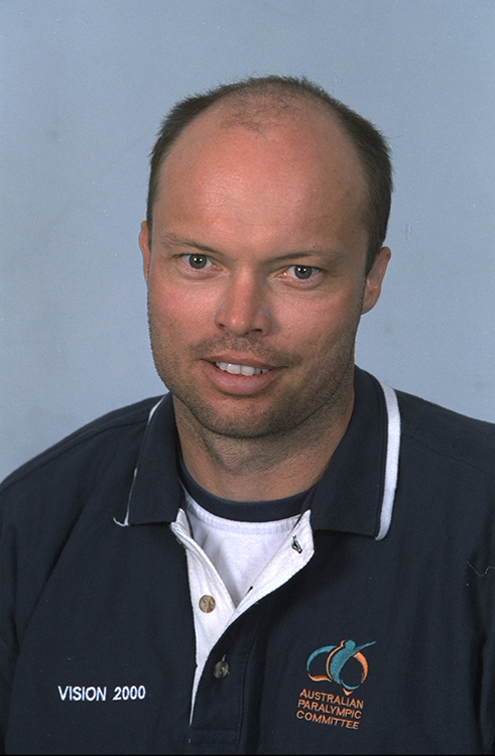
- 2000 Australian Paralympic team portrait of Hall
- Full name: David Robert Hall
- Country (sports): Australia
- Residence: Australia
- Born: 14 January 1970 (age 56) Sydney, New South Wales
- Turned pro: 1993
- Retired: 2006
- Coach: Rich Berman
- Int. Tennis HoF: 2015 (member page)
- Official website: https://letsrollwheelchairtennis.com/

Singles
- Career record: 632–111
- Highest ranking: No. 1 (1995)

Doubles
- Career record: 397–89
- Highest ranking: No. 1 (1994)
Medal record
Men's wheelchair tennis
Representing Australia
Paralympic Games
Bronze medal – third place	1996 Atlanta	Men's singles
Silver medal – second place	1996 Atlanta	Men's doubles
Gold medal – first place	2000 Sydney	Men's singles
Silver medal – second place	2000 Sydney	Men's doubles
Silver medal – second place	2004 Athens	Men's singles
Bronze medal – third place	2004 Athens	Men's doubles

David Robert Hall, OAM (born 14 January 1970) is an Australian former professional wheelchair tennis player. With eight US Open singles titles, two Masters singles titles, and a Paralympic gold medal in singles, he has been referred to as Australia's greatest ever wheelchair tennis player.

== Biography ==
Born in Sydney, Australia, Hall was raised in the New South Wales coastal town of Budgewoi, attending Budgewoi Public School and Northlakes High School. On 11 October 1986, at the age of 16, Hall lost his legs after being hit by a car. After a long period of rehabilitation, Hall began working as a clerk at the local police station. It was around this time that Hall was looking through the local paper and saw a picture of Terry Mason in a wheelchair playing tennis.

Hall had played tennis growing up and at the age of 13 and 14 had been Club Champion at his local tennis club under the coaching supervision of Allan McDonald. Inspired, Hall began to play and entered his first wheelchair tennis competition, the 'Albury-Wodonga Classic', in 1988.

Hall on importance of tennis in his life

Tennis was giving me comfort, something to look forward to. It felt like a long-lost friend who had come back to me. It began to open doors I never knew existed, sending me places I'd never been and giving me chances to meet people I'd never had met. It was creating structure and purpose when I needed it most.

This led to him competing in his first Australian Open in February 1989. Playing in the C division, Hall won. The following year, Hall participated in his first international competition and turned professional in 1993. 1995 saw Hall relocate to the United States. The year culminated with Hall winning the US Open Singles title and being ranked number one in the world.

== Tennis career ==
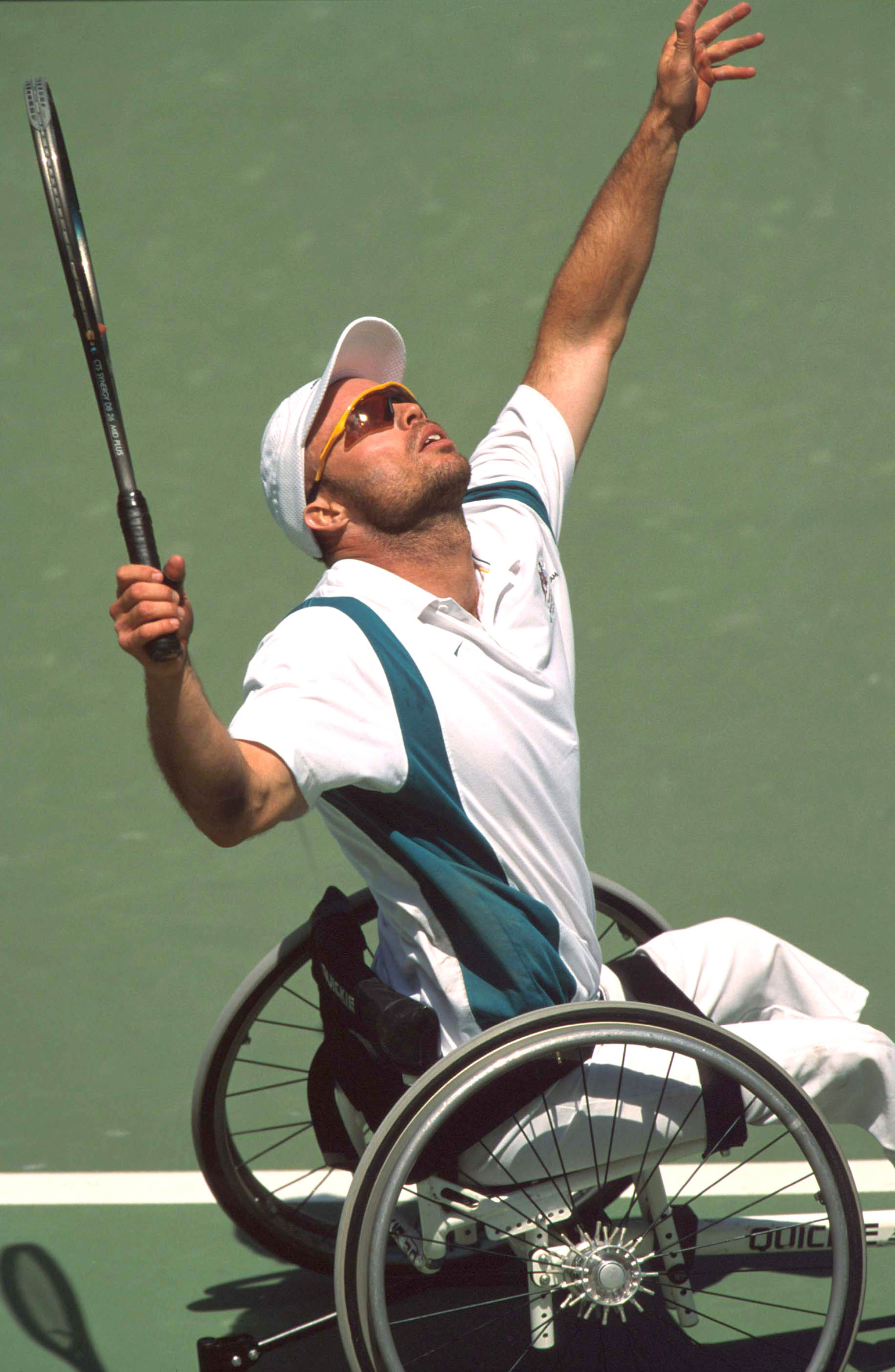
Hall serves the ball during 2000 Summer Paralympics match

In his career, Hall won all of the major world titles and was ranked as the world number one player for six years. He won Paralympic gold, silver and bronze medals and 18 Super Series titles. He was a member of Australia's World Cup winning teams in 1994, 1996, 2000 and 2002. He was ranked World No 1 for eight of the years between 1995 and 2005. Between 1995 and 2005 he won the Australian Open Wheelchair tennis title nine times, the British Open seven times, the US Open eight times, and the Japan Open eight times. For most of his tennis career, Hall was coached by Rich Berman. He was an Australian Institute of Sport scholarship holder from 1995 to 2000.

=== Professional career ===
Hall played professionally for more than a decade before officially retiring from competition in 2006. He announced his retirement from the NEC Wheelchair Tennis Tour in June 2006. He won the NEC Singles Masters titles in 2002 and 2004.

=== Australian Open ===
Hall won nine Australian Opens in the men's singles wheelchair event. He first won the men's single wheelchair event at the Australian Open in 1995. In 1996 he also won the men's doubles with his partner, Mick Connell. He won his first British Open in 1995.

=== British Open ===
Hall won seven British Opens in the men's singles wheelchair event.

=== Japan Open ===
He won the Japan Open eight times.

=== US Open ===
Hall won eight US Opens in the men's singles wheelchair event. Six of these wins were between 1995 and 2002. In 2005, Japan's Shingo Kunieda beat David Hall in the quarter-finals of the US Open. Hall was the first non-American to win the U.S. Open Super Series title. He won five of these eight titles in a row between 2000 and 2004. His 2005 run was ended because France's Michaël Jérémiasz won that year. At the 1999 US Open he lost in the quarter-finals to Robin Ammerlaan.

=== Paralympic Games ===
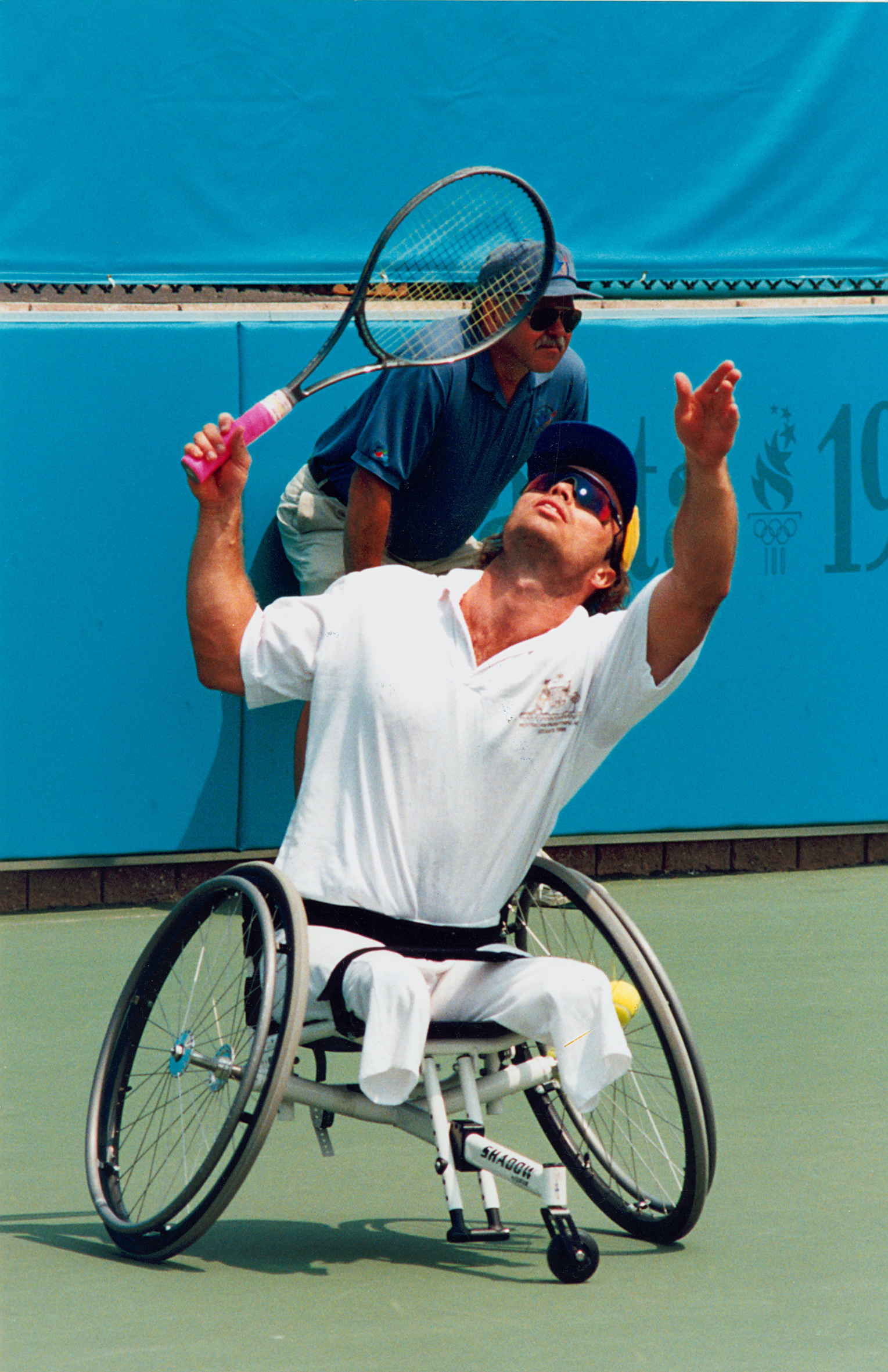
Hall during a match at the 1996 Atlanta Paralympics

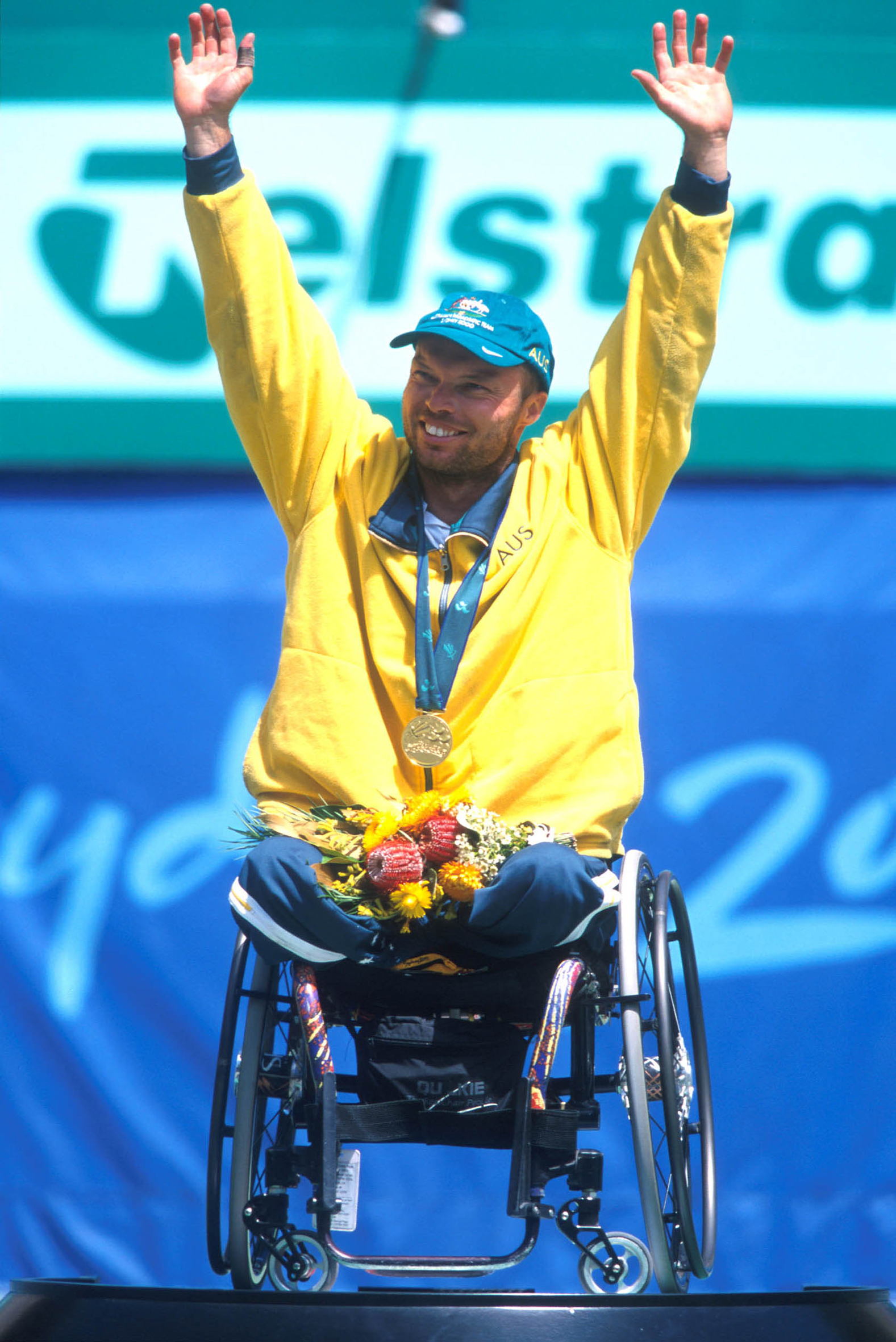
Hall on the podium celebrating his gold medal win at the 2000 Summer Paralympics

Hall represented Australia at the Paralympic Games four times; First in 1992 at Barcelona, Atlanta in 1996, where he won a silver medal in the doubles and a bronze medal in the singles, Sydney in 2000, where he won a gold medal in the singles and a silver medal in the doubles, and Athens in 2004, where he won a silver medal in the singles and a bronze medal in the doubles. He received the Medal of the Order of Australia in the 2001 Australia Day Honours "for service to sport as a gold medallist at the Sydney 2000 Paralympic Games."

=== Other events ===
He competed in more than seventy other tournaments.

In 2013, 6-time World Champion David Hall, together with his long-time coach Rich Berman, released a comprehensive video tutorial of all the basics of playing wheelchair tennis titled Let's Roll - Learning Wheelchair Tennis with the Pros.

== Awards and non-tennis career ==
Hall's accomplishments culminated in him being inducted into the Sport Australia Hall of Fame in 2010. In 2010, he was one of only three Paralympians to have been given the honour.

Hall on induction to Australian Sporting Hall of Fame

It was an amazing feeling and made me feel very proud to be an Australian, especially considering we have such a rich sporting history in this country. For me, the wonderful thing about being inducted is that it recognises disability sporting achievements, being recognised felt like a real validation for Paralympic sport and Paralympic athletes.

Hall was inducted into the New South Wales Hall of Champions in 2009.

In 2010 Hall was appointed an ambassador for wheelchair tennis by the International Tennis Federation to help promote the sport in Australia and worldwide. In 2011, Hall will sit on the selection panel for the Newcombe Medal Award for Most Outstanding Athlete with a Disability.

Hall was a writer for Sports 'n Spokes Magazine. For ten years he worked for Tennis Australia in promoting and raising awareness of wheelchair tennis within Australia. He also worked for the Royal Rehab Centre Sydney as an ambassador from 2007 to 2010. As part of a Sydney Morning Herald report in 2009, Hall toured the city of Sydney to explore the city's wheelchair accessibility. Hall highlighted some of the frustrations of using public transport.

During the Australian Tennis Open in 2015, he was inducted into the Australian Tennis Hall of Fame.

In July 2015, Hall was inducted into the International Tennis Hall of Fame In April 2016, he was awarded the International Tennis Federation's Brad Parks Award for his significant contribution to wheelchair tennis on an international basis.

In December 2016, Hall was inducted into the Australian Paralympic Hall of Fame.
