= Eric Stuurman =

Dutch wheelchair tennis player

Personal information
- Born: 21 January 1965 (age 61)

Sport
- Country: Netherlands
- Sport: Wheelchair tennis
Medal record
Paralympic Games
Bronze medal – third place	1996 Atlanta	Men's doubles

Eric Stuurman (born 21 January 1965) is a Dutch wheelchair tennis player. He won the bronze medal together with Ricky Molier in the men's doubles event in wheelchair tennis at the 1996 Summer Paralympics.

Robin Ammerlaan and Stuurman won the silver medal in the men's doubles event at the 2000 Wheelchair Tennis Masters.

In 2008, Stuurman competed in the wheelchair men's singles event at the 2008 Australian Open held in Melbourne, Australia. Stuurman and also Maikel Scheffers also competed in the wheelchair men's doubles event at the 2008 Australian Open.
