= László Farkas (tennis) =

Hungarian wheelchair tennis player

- Country (sports): Hungary
- Turned pro: 1996
- Plays: Right handed

Singles
- Career titles: 24
- Highest ranking: No. 15 (2 July 2007)
- Current ranking: No. 102 (10 January 2022)

Grand Slam singles results
- Australian Open: 2R (2007)
- French Open: 2R (2008)

Other tournaments
- Paralympic Games: 3R (2004)

Doubles
- Career titles: 33
- Highest ranking: No. 17 (10 November 2003)
- Current ranking: No. 154 (10 January 2022)

László Farkas (born 1970) is a Hungarian wheelchair tennis player, reaching World No. 15 in the singles July 2007 and World No. 17 in the doubles in November 2003. He has competed at five Paralympic Games reaching the third round at 2004 Summer Paralympics, Farkas has competed at two Grand Slams reaching the second round at the Australian Open and French Open.
