= Tadeusz Kruszelnicki =

Polish wheelchair tennis player

- Born: 19 August 1955 (age 69); Gliwice, Poland

Singles
- Highest ranking: No. 3 (10 April 2006)

Grand Slam singles results
- Australian Open: F (2001)

Other tournaments
- Paralympic Games: QF (2004)

Doubles
- Highest ranking: No. 5 (23 June 2003)

Tadeusz Kruszelnicki (born 19 August 1955) is a professional wheelchair tennis player from Poland. Currently residing in Ziębice, Kruszelnicki has been ranked as high as World Number 3 in singles on 10 April 2006, and World Number 5 on 23 June 2003 in the wheelchair rankings. He has represented his country at every Summer Paralympics since 1996, and has competed in both singles and doubles at all of those Games.

== Grand Slam Finals ==
=== Grand Slam Men's Singles Runners-up (1) ===
Year	Tournament	Partnering	Winning Score
2001	Australian Open	(Australia) David Hall	6–2, 6–0
