= Martin Legner =

Austrian wheelchair tennis player

Martin Legner (born 17 December 1961 in Tyrol) is a professional Austrian wheelchair tennis player who has been ranked number one for wheelchair doubles. Legner has won the Australian Open doubles title four times with Robin Ammerlaan since 2000, and has won eight doubles titles. Six of them are Australian Open Titles, the other two being French Open titles. He has won one French Open and one Australian Open singles title. He has represented his country at every Summer Paralympics since 1992, and has competed in both singles and doubles at all of those Games. His favorite surfaces are clay and hard court. As of 7 April 2007 his highest singles rank was number three. Also of that date, he was ranked number six for singles and doubles.

He competed in wheelchair tennis at the 2020 Summer Paralympics.

== Grand Slam wins ==
=== Singles ===
- 2005 Australian Open
- 1998 French Open

=== Doubles ===
- 2006 Australian Open (w/ Ammerlaan)
- 2005 Australian Open (w/ Ammerlaan)
- 2004 Australian Open (w/ Ammerlaan)
- 2003 French Open (w/ Saida)
- 2003 Australian Open (w/ Ammerlaan)
- 2002 French Open (w/ Saida)
- 2002 Australian Open (w/ Saida)
- 1999 Australian Open (w/ Mistry)
