= Robin Ammerlaan =

Dutch wheelchair tennis player

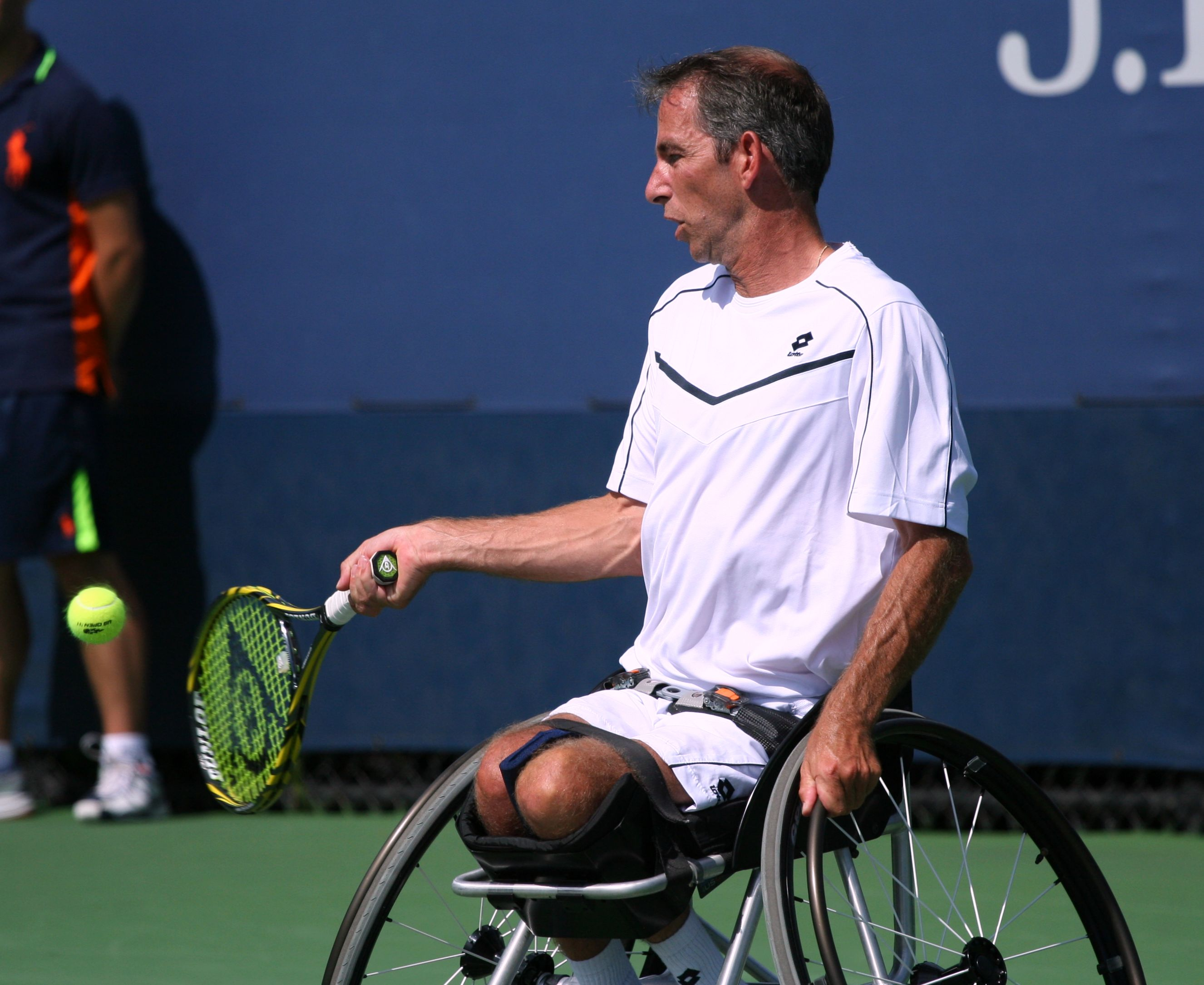
- Ammerlaan at the 2011 US Open.
- Country (sports): Netherlands
- Residence: Elen, Belgium
- Born: 26 February 1968 (age 58) The Hague, The Netherlands
- Turned pro: 1998
- Retired: 2012
- Plays: Right Handed
- Official website: www.robinammerlaan.nl

Singles
- Career record: 676–142
- Highest ranking: No.1 (29 July 2002)
- Current ranking: –

Grand Slam singles results
- Australian Open: W (2002)
- French Open: F (2007, 2008)
- US Open: W (2005, 2006)

Other tournaments
- Masters: W (1999, 2000, 2003, 2005, 2006, 2007)
- Paralympic Games: Gold Medal (2004)

Doubles
- Career record: 547–130
- Career titles: 88
- Highest ranking: No.1 (29 March 2004)
- Current ranking: –

Grand Slam doubles results
- Australian Open: W (2004, 2005, 2006, 2007, 2009, 2012)
- French Open: F (2008, 2009)
- Wimbledon: W (2007, 2008, 2010)
- US Open: W (2005, 2006)

Other doubles tournaments
- Masters Doubles: F (2000, 2010)
- Paralympic Games: Gold Medal (2000)
Medal record
Men's wheelchair tennis
Representing Netherlands
Paralympic Games
Gold medal – first place	2000 Sydney	Men's doubles
Gold medal – first place	2004 Athens	Men's singles
Silver medal – second place	2008 Beijing	Men's singles

Robin Ammerlaan (born 26 February 1968 in The Hague) is a Dutch former professional wheelchair tennis player. A former world No. 1 in both singles and doubles, Ammerlaan is a 14-time major champion and two-time Paralympic gold medalist. The right-handed player's favourite surface is carpet, and he was coached by Gert Bolk. His wheelchair is manufactured by Invacare. Ammerlaan ended his professional career after the 2012 London Paralympics.

== Paralympic games ==
=== Sydney 2000 ===
He won the gold medal for Wheelchair tennis men double with Ricky Molier. In the final they played against David Johnson and David Hall from Australia.

=== Athens 2004 ===
He won the gold medal for Wheelchair tennis men singles. In the final he played against David Hall from Australia.

=== Beijing 2008 ===
He won the silver medal for wheelchair tennis men single. He lost in the final from Shingo Kunieda from Japan

== Grand Slam Titles ==
=== Singles ===
- 2006 French Open
- 2005 US Open
- 2005 Australian Open
- 2003 Australian Open
- 2002 Australian Open

=== Doubles ===
- 2008 Wimbledon (w/ Vink)
- 2007 Wimbledon (w/ Vink)
- 2007 Australian Open (w/ Kunieda)
- 2006 US Open (w/ Jeremiasz)
- 2006 Australian Open (w/ Legner)
- 2005 US Open (w/ Jeremiasz)
- 2005 Australian Open (w/ Legner)
- 2004 Australian Open (w/ Legner)
- 2003 Australian Open (w/ Kruszelnicki)

== Performance timelines ==
Key
W	F	SF	QF	#R	RR	Q#	DNQ	A	NH

(W) winner; (F) finalist; (SF) semifinalist; (QF) quarterfinalist; (#R) rounds 4, 3, 2, 1; (RR) round-robin stage; (Q#) qualification round; (DNQ) did not qualify; (A) absent; (NH) not held; (SR) strike rate (events won / competed); (W–L) win–loss record.

=== Singles ===
Tournament	2007	2008	2009	2010	2011	SR	W–L
Grand Slam tournaments
Australian Open	SF	SF	QF	SF	SF	0 / 5	4–5
French Open	F	F	QF	QF	QF	0 / 5	4–5
Wimbledon						0 / 0	0–0
US Open	F		SF	QF	QF	0 / 4	3–4
Win–loss	5–3	3–2	1–3	1–3	1–3	0 / 14	11–14

=== Doubles ===
Tournament	2004	2005	2006	2007	2008	2009	2010	2011	SR	W–L
Grand Slam tournaments
Australian Open	W	W	W	W	F	W	F	F	2 / 5	7–3
French Open	NH	NH	NH	F	F	F	F	F	0 / 5	5–5
Wimbledon	NH	NH	NH	W	W	F	W	F	3 / 5	8–2
US Open	A	W	W	F	NH	F	F	F	0 / 4	4–4
Win–loss				6–2	4–2	5–3	5–3	4–4	5 / 19	23–14

Preceded by Michaël Jeremiasz	ITF Wheelchair Tennis World Champion; 2006	Succeeded by Shingo Kunieda
