= Maikel Scheffers =

Dutch wheelchair tennis player

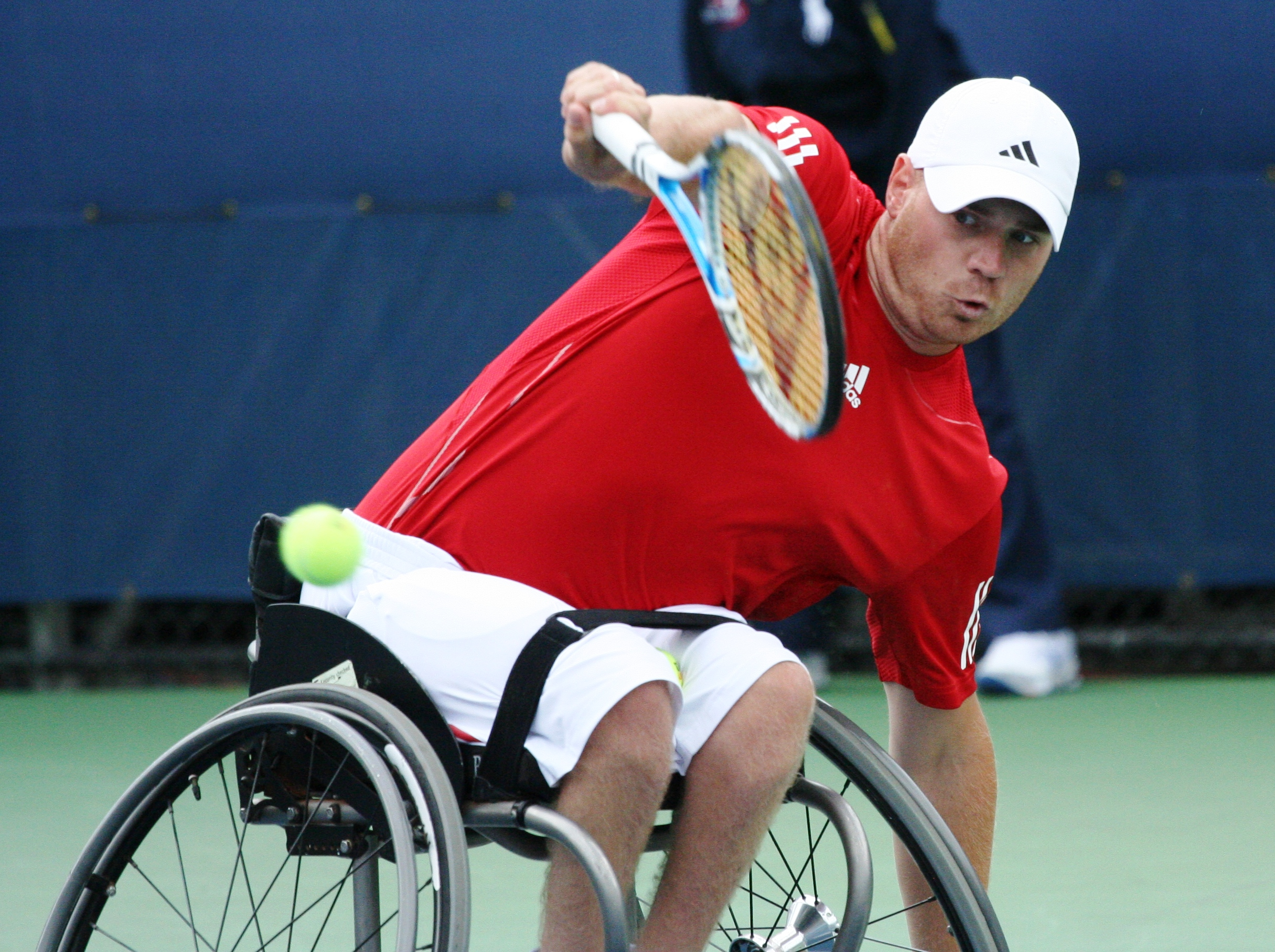
- Full name: Maikel Scheffers
- Country (sports): Netherlands
- Residence: Dorst, Netherlands
- Born: 7 September 1982 (age 43) 's-Hertogenbosch, Netherlands
- Plays: Right handed
- Official website: www.maikelscheffers.nl

Singles
- Career record: 557–237
- Highest ranking: No. 1 (19 December 2011)
- Current ranking: No. 10 (9 April 2018)

Grand Slam singles results
- Australian Open: W (2012)
- French Open: W (2011)
- Wimbledon: QF (2016, 2017)
- US Open: F (2009)

Other tournaments
- Masters: W (2009)
- Paralympic Games: Bronze Medal (2008)

Doubles
- Career record: 482–208
- Highest ranking: No. 1 (27 June 2011)
- Current ranking: No. 8 (7 December 2015)

Grand Slam doubles results
- Australian Open: W (2011)
- French Open: W (2008)
- Wimbledon: W (2011)
- US Open: W (2010, 2013)

Other doubles tournaments
- Masters Doubles: W (2006, 2009, 2010)
- Paralympic Games: Bronze Medal (2020)
Medal record
Men's wheelchair tennis
Representing Netherlands
Paralympic Games
Bronze medal – third place	2008 Beijing	Men's singles
Bronze medal – third place	2020 Tokyo	Men's doubles
European Championships
Bronze medal – third place	2023 Rotterdam	Men's singles
- Last updated on: 3 September 2021.

Maikel Scheffers (born 7 September 1982) is a Dutch wheelchair tennis player. He plays singles and doubles events. Scheffers was born with spina bifida. He lives in Dorst.

He has won six Grand Slam titles—two in wheelchair singles and four in wheelchair doubles.

== Paralympic Games ==
Scheffers participated in the 2008 Summer Paralympics in Beijing. He won a bronze medal in the wheelchair men singles competition. In the wheelchair men's doubles tournament, he and partner Ronald Vink lost in the bronze medal game to Shingo Kunieda and Satoshi Saida.

== Grand Slam performance timelines ==
Key
W	F	SF	QF	#R	RR	Q#	DNQ	A	NH

(W) winner; (F) finalist; (SF) semifinalist; (QF) quarterfinalist; (#R) rounds 4, 3, 2, 1; (RR) round-robin stage; (Q#) qualification round; (DNQ) did not qualify; (A) absent; (NH) not held; (SR) strike rate (events won / competed); (W–L) win–loss record.
To avoid confusion and double counting, these charts are updated at the conclusion of a tournament or when the player's participation has ended.

=== Wheelchair singles ===
Tournament	2006	2007	2008	2009	2010	2011	2012	2013	2014	2015	2016	2017	2018	2019	2020	2021	2022	2023	2024
Australian Open	?	QF	QF	SF	QF	QF	W	QF	SF	QF	QF	QF	A	A	A	A	A	1R	1R
French Open	?	A	QF	QF	QF	W	QF	SF	QF	SF	A	QF	A	A	A	A	A	1R	1R
Wimbledon	NH	NH	NH	NH	NH	NH	NH	NH	NH	NH	QF	QF	A	A	NH	A	A	A	1R
US Open	QF	A	NH	F	SF	SF	NH	QF	QF	QF	NH	A	A	A	A	A	1R	1R	

Source: Profile at www.australianopen.com and Profile at 2011.usopen.org

=== Wheelchair doubles ===
Tournament	2007	2008	2009	2010	2011	2012	2013	2014	2015	2016	2017	2018	2019	2020	2021	2022	2023	2024
Australian Open	F	1R	F	F	W	SF	SF	F	SF	SF	SF	A	A	A	A	A	QF	QF
French Open	A	W	F	F	F	SF	SF	SF	SF	A	SF	A	A	A	A	A	QF	QF
Wimbledon	F	A	F	F	W	A	SF	F	A	SF	SF	A	A	NH	A	A	A	
US Open	A	A	F	W	F	NH	W	F	SF	NH	A	A	A	A	A	QF	QF	

Source: Profile at www.australianopen.com and Profile at 2011.usopen.org
