= Nicolas Peifer =

French wheelchair tennis player

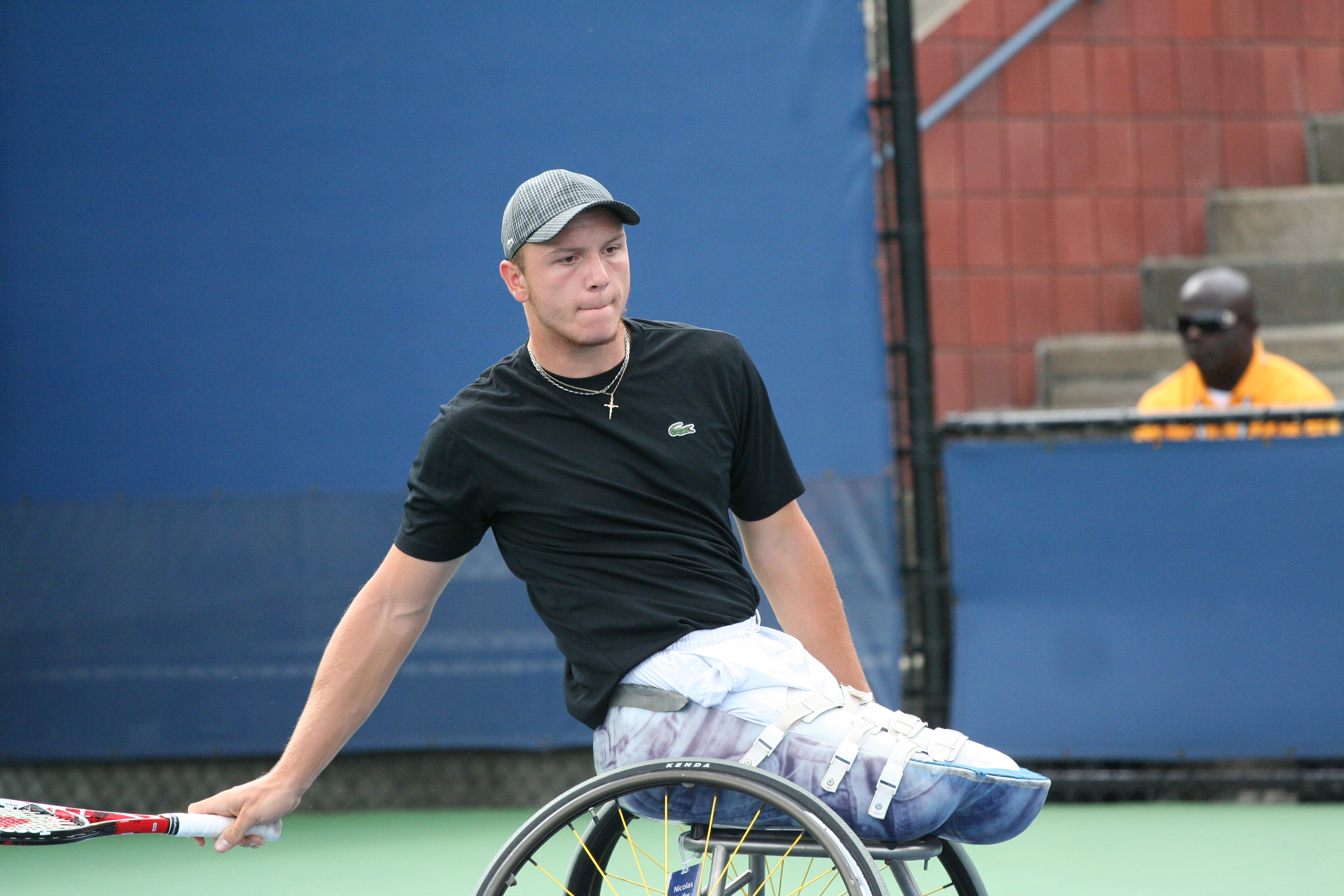
- Peifer at the 2010 US Open
- Full name: Nicolas Peifer
- Country (sports): France
- Residence: Sarreguemines, France
- Born: 13 October 1990 (age 35) Strasbourg, France
- Plays: Right handed

Singles
- Highest ranking: No. 2 (31 August 2015)
- Current ranking: No. 7 (15 February 2021)

Grand Slam singles results
- Australian Open: F (2012, 2017)
- French Open: F (2011)
- Wimbledon: QF (2016, 2017, 2018, 2019, 2021, 2022)
- US Open: F (2010)

Other tournaments
- Masters: F (2014)
- Paralympic Games: QF (2020)

Doubles
- Highest ranking: No. 1 (24 September 2018)
- Current ranking: No. 4 (15 February 2021)

Grand Slam doubles results
- Australian Open: W (2016, 2018)
- French Open: W (2011, 2017, 2018)
- Wimbledon: W (2015)
- US Open: W (2011, 2022)

Other doubles tournaments
- Masters Doubles: W (2016, 2018)
- Paralympic Games: Gold Medal (2016, 2020)

Nicolas Peifer (born 13 October 1990 in Strasbourg) is a French wheelchair tennis player. In doubles, Peifer has completed the career Super Slam, having won all four majors, a Paralympic gold medal in 2016, and the Wheelchair Tennis Masters over the course of his career.

In 2007 Peifer won the Junior Masters.

== Grand Slam wins ==
=== Doubles ===
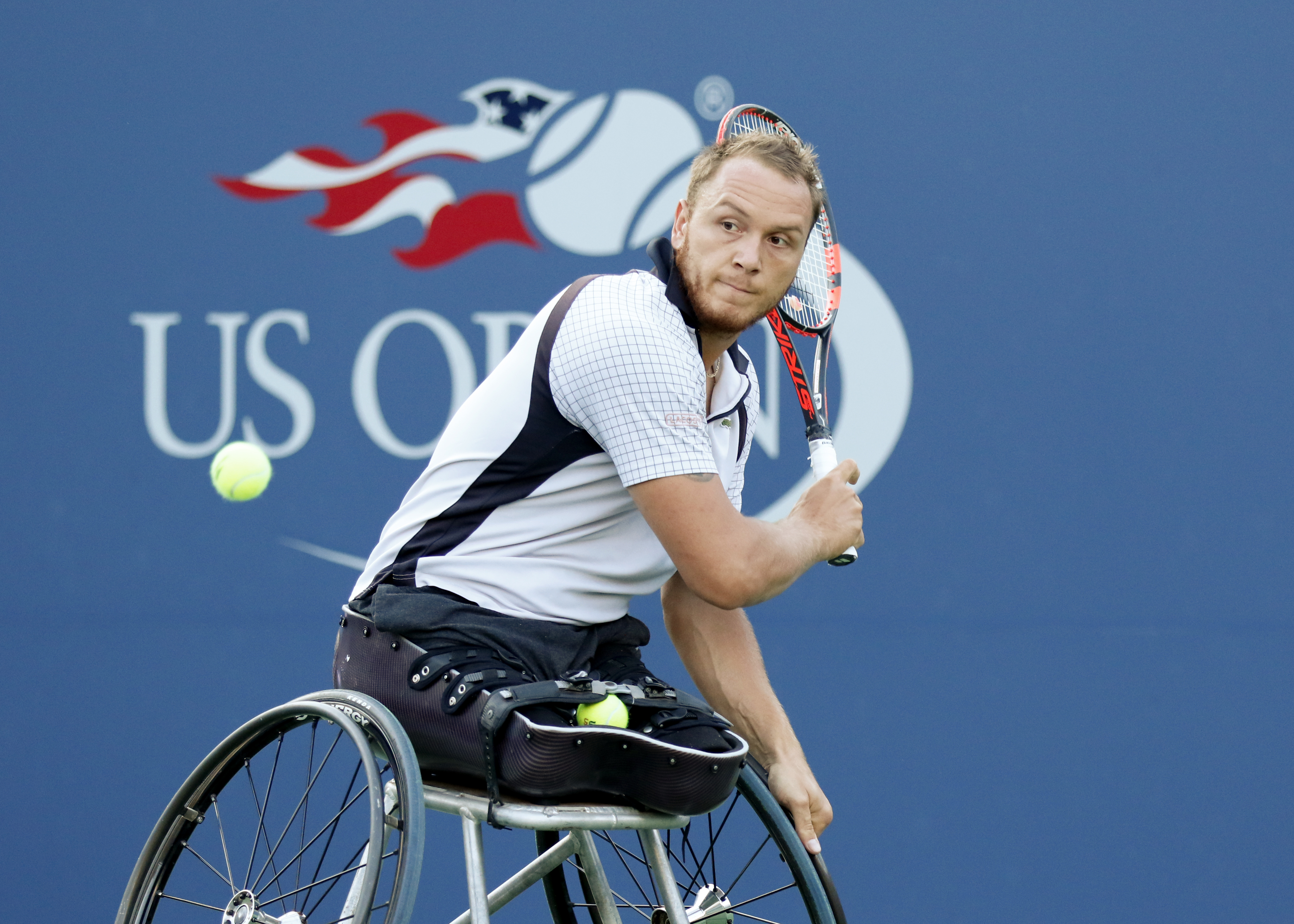
Nico Peifer at the 2017 US Open

- French Open: 2011 (w/ Kunieda), 2017 (w/ Houdet)
- US Open: 2011 (w/ Houdet)
- Wimbledon: 2015 (w/ Fernández)
- Australian Open: 2018 (w/ Houdet)

== Legal issues ==
In December of 2022 Peifer was given a suspended six-month prison sentence by a court in France for sexually harassing a minor aged under 15 years. The initial charge of "sexual proposition made to a minor under 15 by electronic means" was changed to "sexual harassment" after a court hearing in Peifer's hometown of Sarreguemines in north-eastern France.
