= Michaël Jérémiasz =

French wheelchair tennis player

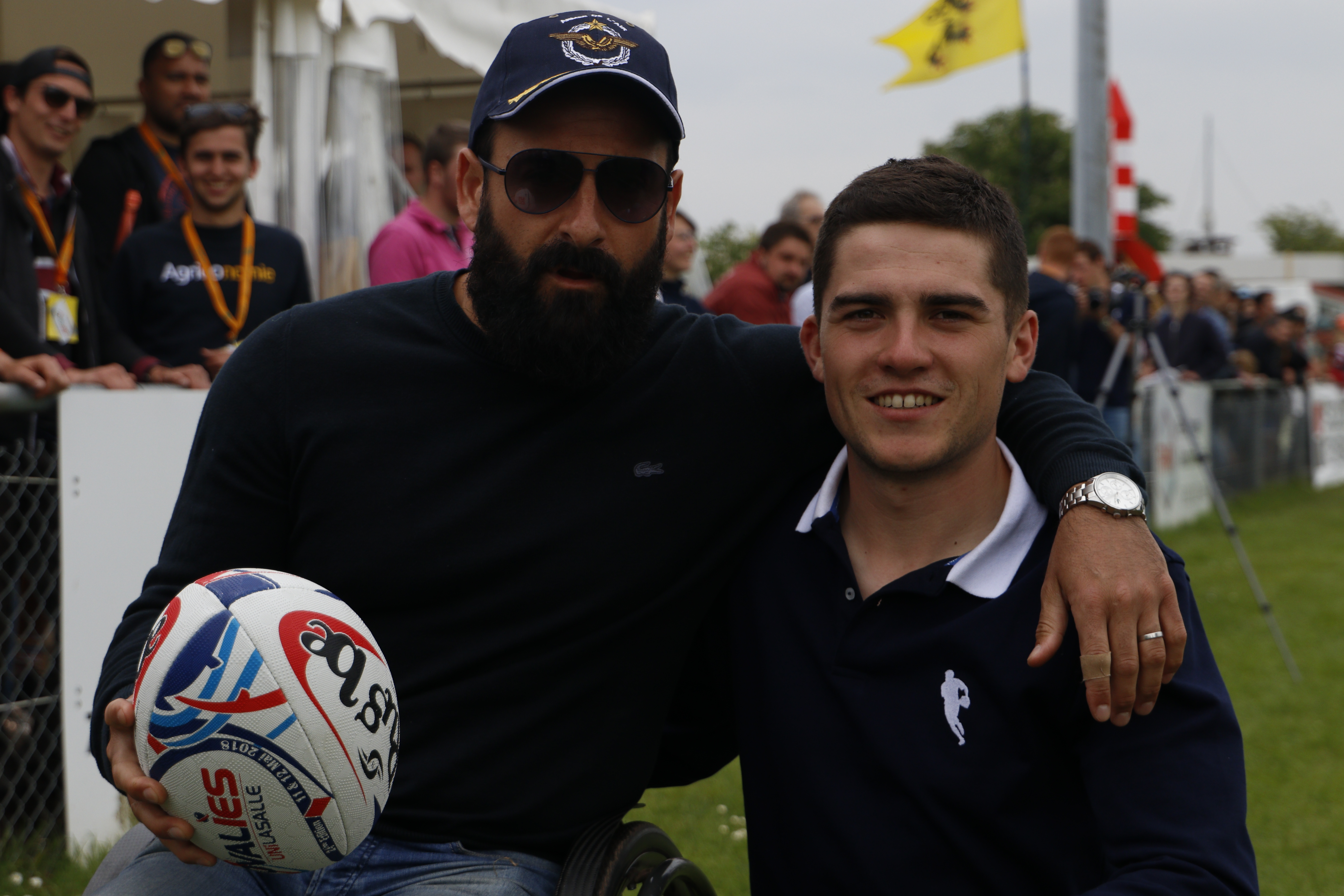
- Jérémiasz, (wearing sunglasses) with Guillaume Marre in 2018
- Country (sports): France
- Born: 15 October 1981 (age 43); Paris, France
- Retired: 2017
- Plays: Right handed

Singles
- Highest ranking: No.1 (2005)

Grand Slam singles results
- French Open: QF (2016)

Other tournaments
- Masters: F (2004, 2005, 2007)
- Paralympic Games: Bronze Medal (2004)

Doubles
- Highest ranking: No.1 (2004)

Grand Slam doubles results
- Australian Open: W (2013)
- French Open: W (2009)
- Wimbledon: W (2009, 2012)
- US Open: W (2005, 2006)

Other doubles tournaments
- Masters Doubles: W (2005, 2007)
- Paralympic Games: Gold Medal (2008); Bronze Medal (2012)
Medal record
Men's wheelchair tennis
Representing France
Gold medal – first place	2008 Beijing	Men's doubles
Silver medal – second place	2004 Athens	Men's doubles
Bronze medal – third place	2004 Athens	Men's singles

Michaël Jérémiasz (born 15 October 1981, in Paris) is a French former professional wheelchair tennis player. He won a gold medal in the men's doubles event at the 2008 Beijing Paralympics, and has completed the career Super Slam in doubles. Jérémiasz has been ranked world No. 1 in both doubles and singles. He is right-handed and likes hard courts. He was coached by Jerome Delbert.

== Grand Slam titles ==
=== Doubles ===
- 2003 Australian Open (w/Hall)
- 2005 US Open (w/Ammerlaan)
- 2006 US Open (w/Ammerlaan)
- 2009 French Open (w/Houdet)
- 2009 Wimbledon Championships (w/Houdet)
- 2012 Wimbledon Championships (w/Egberink)

== Performance timelines ==
Key
W	F	SF	QF	#R	RR	Q#	DNQ	A	NH

(W) winner; (F) finalist; (SF) semifinalist; (QF) quarterfinalist; (#R) rounds 4, 3, 2, 1; (RR) round-robin stage; (Q#) qualification round; (DNQ) did not qualify; (A) absent; (NH) not held; (SR) strike rate (events won / competed); (W–L) win–loss record.

=== Wheelchair singles ===
Tournament	2003	2005	2006	2007	2008	2009	2011	2012	SR	W–L
Grand Slam tournaments
Australian Open	QF	A	W	F	F	SF	A	A	1 / 5	8–4
French Open	A	A	A	SF	A	SF	QF	W	1 / 4	5–3
Wimbledon	NH	NH	NH	NH	NH	NH	NH	NH	0 / 0	0–0
US Open	NH	F	F	QF	NH	A	A	NH	0 / 3	4–3
Win–loss	0–1	2–1	5–1	3–3	2–1	2–2	0–1	3–0	2 / 12	17–10

=== Wheelchair doubles ===
Tournament	2003	2005	2006	2007	2008	2009	2011	2012	SR	W–L
Grand Slam tournaments
Australian Open	F	A	F	F	F	F	A	A	0 / 5	5–5
French Open	A	A	A	W	A	W	F	F	2 / 4	6–2
Wimbledon	A	W	F	A	A	W	F	W	3 / 5	8–2
US Open	A	W	W	F	NH	A	A	NH	2 / 3	5–1
Win–loss	1–1	4–0	4–2	4–2	1–1	5–1	2–2	3–1	7 / 16	24–10

Preceded by David Hall	ITF Wheelchair Tennis World Champion; 2005	Succeeded by Robin Ammerlaan
