= Satoshi Saida =

Japanese wheelchair tennis player

Satoshi Saida 斎田 悟司
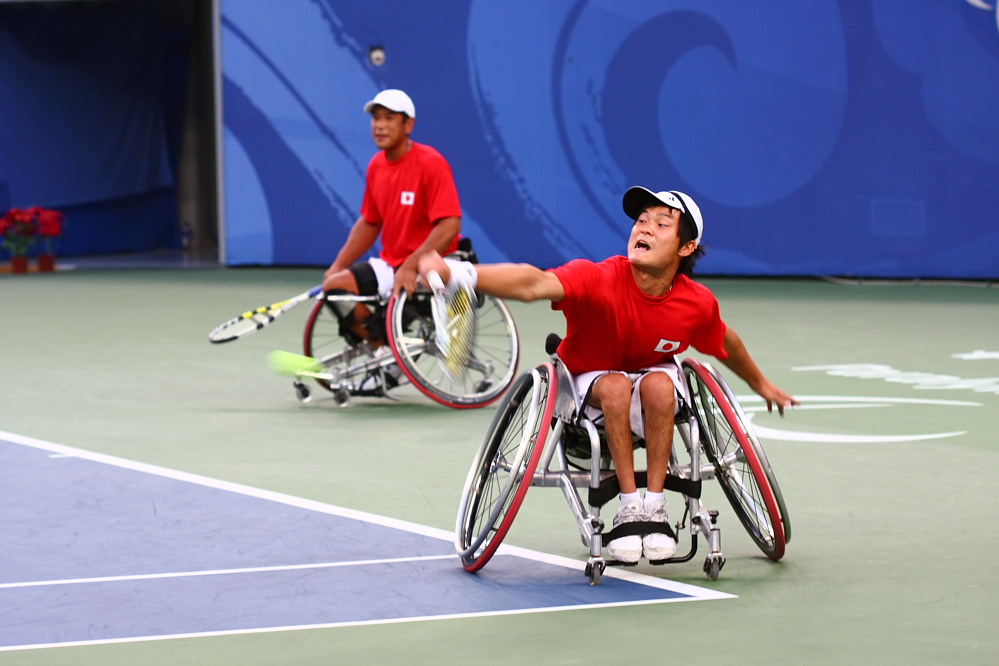
- Country (sports): Japan
- Residence: Mie Preti, Japan
- Born: March 26, 1972 (age 54) Kashiwa City, Japan
- Plays: Right Handed

Singles
- Career record: 486–163
- Highest ranking: No.3 (11 August 2003)
- Current ranking: No.23 (18 September 2017)

Doubles
- Career record: 446–99
- Highest ranking: No.1 (18 November 2002)
- Current ranking: No.28 (18 September 2017)

Grand Slam doubles results
- Australian Open: W (2008)
- Wimbledon: W (2006)
- US Open: W (2007)

Other doubles tournaments
- Masters Doubles: W (2003, 2004)
- Paralympic Games: Gold Medal (2004); Bronze Medal (2008, 2016)
Medal record
Men's wheelchair tennis
Representing Japan
Paralympic Games
Gold medal – first place	2004 Athens	Men's doubles
Bronze medal – third place	2008 Beijing	Men's doubles
Bronze medal – third place	2016 Rio	Men's doubles
Asian Para Games
Gold medal – first place	2010 Guangzhou	Men's doubles

Satoshi Saida (斎田 悟司, Saida Satoshi; born March 26, 1972 in Yokkaichi, Mie) is a Japanese pioneering wheelchair tennis player and 2004 Summer Paralympics gold medalist (Men's doubles with Shingo Kunieda).

Saida, a big baseball enthusiast in his childhood, lost his left leg because of bone cancer at age twelve. At first, he used to play wheelchair basketball with his friends. Saida started his career in wheelchair tennis when he was fourteen years old.

As a competitor, his first Paralympics was the 1996 Summer Paralympics in Atlanta, USA; at the succeeding games in Sydney, Australia, he got eighth place. With Shingo Kunieda, he participated in the 2004 Summer Paralympics in Athens, Greece, and won the men's doubles event. The two competed together again at the 2008 Beijing Games and took bronze in the doubles event.
