= 2016 Wheelchair Doubles Masters =

- Date: 2–6 November 2016
- Edition: 17th (men/women) / 14th (quad)
- Category: ITF Masters Series
- Draw: 8M/6W/4Q
- Surface: Hard
- Location: Mission Viejo, California, United States

Champions

Men's doubles
- (France) Stéphane Houdet / (France) Nicolas Peifer

Women's doubles
- (Netherlands) Diede de Groot / (United Kingdom) Lucy Shuker

Quad doubles
- (United Kingdom) Antony Cotteril / (United Kingdom) Andrew Lapthorne
← 2015 ·	Wheelchair Doubles Masters	· 2017 →

The 2016 Wheelchair Doubles Masters (also known as the 2016 Uniqlo Wheelchair Doubles Masters for sponsorship reasons) is a wheelchair tennis tournament played in Mission Viejo, California, United States, from 2 to 6 November 2016. It is the season-ending event for the highest-ranked wheelchair tennis doubles players on the 2016 ITF Wheelchair Tennis Tour.

== Tournament ==
The 2016 Uniqlo Wheelchair Doubles Masters took place from 2 to 6 November in Mission Viejo, California, United States. It was the 17th edition of the tournament (14th for quad players). The tournament is run by the International Tennis Federation (ITF) and is part of the 2016 ITF Wheelchair Tennis Tour. The event takes place on hard courts. It serves as the season-ending championships for doubles players on the ITF Wheelchair Tennis Tour. The eight pairs who qualify for the men's event and six pairs who qualify for women's event are split into two groups of three or four. The four pairs who qualify for the quad event compete in one group. During this stage, pairs compete in a round-robin format (meaning pairs play against all the other players in their group). In the men's and women's events the two pairs with the best results in each group progress to the semifinals, where the winners of a group face the runners-up of the other group. In the quad event, the top two pairs progress to the final. This stage, however, is a knock-out stage.

=== Format ===
The Wheelchair Doubles Masters has a round-robin format, with eight men's pairs, six women's pairs and four quad pairs competing. The seeds are determined by the UNIQLO Wheelchair Tennis Rankings as they stood on 26 September 2016. All matches are the best of three tie-break sets, including the final.

== Qualified pairs ==
The following pairs qualified for the 2016 Wheelchair Doubles Masters, based upon rankings as at 26 September 2016.

Men's doubles

Rank	Player	Team ranking	Total points	Tourn
1	(France) Stéphane Houdet (France) Nicolas Peifer	4	5485; 5020	9
2	(France) Michaël Jeremiasz (United Kingdom) Gordon Reid	6	3989; 5249	9
3	(Argentina) Gustavo Fernández (Belgium) Joachim Gérard	19	2149; 2989	9
4	(United Kingdom) Alfie Hewett (United Kingdom) David Phillipson	28	3787; 1163	9
5	(Brazil) Rafael Medeiros (Brazil) Daniel Rodrigues	73	808; 836	9
6	(Brazil) Maurício Pommê (Brazil) Carlos Santos	89	688; 725	9
7	(Italy) Antonio Cippo (Italy) Ivan Tratter	131	446; 520	9
8	(Italy) Massimiliano Banci (Italy) Silviu Culea	140	549; 363	9

Women's singles

Rank	Player	Team ranking	Total points	Tourn
1	(Netherlands) Diede de Groot (United Kingdom) Lucy Shuker	15	2543; 1897	8
2	(Germany) Katharina Krüger (Netherlands) Michaela Spaanstra	22	1615; 1870	8
3	(United Kingdom) Louise Hunt (United States) Dana Mathewson	24	1754; 1497	8
4	(Italy) Giulia Capocci (Italy) Marianna Lauro	49	835; 731	8
5	(France) Charlotte Famin (United States) Emmy Kaiser	50	1435; 514	8
6	(Colombia) Angélica Bernal (Chile) Francisca Mardones	58	489; 864	8

Quad singles

Rank	Player	Team ranking	Total points	Tourn
1	(United States) Nick Taylor (United States) David Wagner	6	2331; 3676	7
2	(United Kingdom) Antony Cotterill (United Kingdom) Andrew Lapthorne	16	1176; 3036	7
3	(United States) Greg Hasterok (Brazil) Ymanitu Silva	23	1334; 1302	7
4	(Canada) Mika Ishikawa (South Korea) Kim Kyu-seung	35	420; 1000	4

== Champions ==
=== Men's doubles ===
(France) Stéphane Houdet / (France) Nicolas Peifer def. (Argentina) Gustavo Fernández / (Belgium) Joachim Gérard, 2–6, 6–3, 7–5

=== Women's doubles ===
(Netherlands) Diede de Groot / (United Kingdom) Lucy Shuker def. (United Kingdom) Louise Hunt / (United States) Dana Mathewson, 6–3, 4–6, 6–4

=== Quad doubles ===
(United Kingdom) Antony Cotterill / (United Kingdom) Andrew Lapthorne def. (United States) Nick Taylor / (United States) David Wagner, 7–5, 1–6, 6–4

== See also ==
- ITF Wheelchair Tennis Tour
- 2016 Wheelchair Tennis Masters
