= 2017 Wheelchair Doubles Masters =

- Date: 22–26 November 2017
- Edition: 18th (men/women) / 15th (quad)
- Category: ITF Masters Series
- Draw: 8M/6W/4Q
- Surface: Hard / indoor
- Location: Bemmel, Netherlands
- Venue: Sportcentrum de Schaapskooi

Champions

Men's doubles
- (United Kingdom) Alfie Hewett / (United Kingdom) Gordon Reid

Women's doubles
- (Netherlands) Marjolein Buis / (Netherlands) Diede de Groot

Quad doubles
- (United States) Nick Taylor / (United States) David Wagner
← 2016 ·	Wheelchair Doubles Masters	· 2018 →

The 2017 Wheelchair Doubles Masters (also known as the 2017 Uniqlo Wheelchair Doubles Masters for sponsorship reasons) is a wheelchair tennis tournament played at the Sportcentrum de Schaapskooi in Bemmel, Netherlands, from 22 to 26 November 2017. It is the season-ending event for the highest-ranked wheelchair tennis doubles players on the 2017 ITF Wheelchair Tennis Tour.

== Tournament ==
The 2017 Uniqlo Wheelchair Doubles Masters took place from 22 to 26 November at the Sportcentrum de Schaapskooi in Bemmel, Netherlands. It was the 18th edition of the tournament (15th for quad players). The tournament is run by the International Tennis Federation (ITF) and is part of the 2017 ITF Wheelchair Tennis Tour. The event takes place on indoor hard courts. It serves as the season-ending championships for doubles players on the ITF Wheelchair Tennis Tour. The eight pairs who qualify for the men's event and six pairs who qualify for women's event are split into two groups of three or four. The four pairs who qualify for the quad event compete in one group. During this stage, pairs compete in a round-robin format (meaning pairs play against all the other players in their group). In the men's and women's events the two pairs with the best results in each group progress to the semifinals, where the winners of a group face the runners-up of the other group. In the quad event, the top two pairs progress to the final. This stage, however, is a knock-out stage.

=== Format ===
The Wheelchair Doubles Masters has a round-robin format, with eight men's pairs, six women's pairs and four quad pairs competing. The seeds are determined by the UNIQLO Wheelchair Tennis Rankings as they stood on 9 October 2017. All matches are the best of three tie-break sets, including the final.

== Qualified pairs ==
The following pairs qualified for the 2017 Wheelchair Doubles Masters, based upon rankings as at 9 October 2017. Players whose names are struck out qualified but did not participate and were replaced by the next highest ranking player.

Men's Doubles

Rank	Player	Team ranking	Total points	Tourn
1	(France) Stéphane Houdet (France) Nicolas Peifer	3	5850; 5850	9
2	(United Kingdom) Alfie Hewett (United Kingdom) Gordon Reid	7	5018; 5210	9
3	(Argentina) Gustavo Fernández (Netherlands) Maikel Scheffers	12	3237; 2693	9
4	(Belgium) Joachim Gérard (Sweden) Stefan Olsson	16	3216; 2144	9
5	(Japan) ~~Takuya Miki~~ (Japan) ~~Takashi Sanada~~	17	2536; 2228	9
6	(France) Frédéric Cattanéo (South Africa) Evans Maripa	23	1706; 1863	9
7	(Spain) Daniel Caverzaschi (Spain) Martín de la Puente	30	1682; 1354	9
8	(Poland) Kamil Fabisiak (Austria) Martin Legner	41	1122; 1091	9
9	(Netherlands) Carlos Anker (Netherlands) Ruben Spaargaren			

Women's Singles

Rank	Player	Team ranking	Total points	Tourn
1	(Netherlands) Marjolein Buis (Netherlands) Diede de Groot	3	4380; 4250	8
2	(United States) Dana Mathewson (United Kingdom) Lucy Shuker	11	3064; 2547	8
3	(Germany) Sabine Ellerbrock (Netherlands) Aniek van Koot	15	3615; 1745	8
4	(France) Charlotte Famin (South Africa) Kgothatso Montjane	16	2062; 1883	8
5	(Italy) Giulia Capocci (Germany) Katharina Krüger	23	2033; 1300	8
6	(United Kingdom) Louise Hunt (Netherlands) Michaela Spaanstra	26	1566; 1521	8

Quad Singles

Rank	Player	Team ranking	Total points	Tourn
1	(United Kingdom) Antony Cotterill (United Kingdom) Andrew Lapthorne	5	3425; 4277	7
2	(United States) Nick Taylor (United States) David Wagner	8	1790; 4509	7
3	(Australia) Heath Davidson (South Africa) Lucas Sithole	11	2282; 2518	7
4	(United States) Greg Hasterok (South Korea) Kim Kyu-seung	12	2758; 1664	7

== Champions ==
=== Men's doubles ===
(United Kingdom) Alfie Hewett / (United Kingdom) Gordon Reid def. (France) Stéphane Houdet / (France) Nicolas Peifer, 1–6, 6–4, 7–5

=== Women's doubles ===
(Netherlands) Marjolein Buis / (Netherlands) Diede de Groot def. (Germany) Sabine Ellerbrock / (Netherlands) Aniek van Koot, 6–2, 6–4

=== Quad doubles ===
(United States) Nick Taylor / (United States) David Wagner def. (United Kingdom) Antony Cotterill / (United Kingdom) Andrew Lapthorne, 6–4, 6–3

== See also ==
- ITF Wheelchair Tennis Tour
- 2017 Wheelchair Tennis Masters
