= 2017 Wheelchair Tennis Masters =

- Date: 29 November–3 December 2017
- Edition: 24th (men/women) / 14th (quad)
- Category: ITF Masters Series
- Draw: 8M/8W/6Q
- Surface: Hard / indoor
- Location: Loughborough, United Kingdom
- Venue: Loughborough University Tennis Centre

Champions

Men's singles
- (United Kingdom) Alfie Hewett

Women's singles
- (Netherlands) Diede de Groot

Quad singles
- (United States) David Wagner
- Wheelchair Tennis Masters

The 2017 Wheelchair Tennis Masters (also known as the 2017 NEC Wheelchair Tennis Masters for sponsorship reasons) is a wheelchair tennis tournament played at the Loughborough University Tennis Centre in Loughborough, United Kingdom, from 29 November to 3 December 2017. It is the season-ending event for the highest-ranked wheelchair tennis singles players on the 2017 ITF Wheelchair Tennis Tour.

== Tournament ==
The 2017 NEC Wheelchair Tennis Masters took place from 29 November to 3 December at the Loughborough University Tennis Centre in Loughborough, United Kingdom. It was the 24th edition of the tournament (14th for quad players). The tournament is run by the International Tennis Federation (ITF) and is part of the 2017 ITF Wheelchair Tennis Tour. The event takes place on indoor hard courts. It serves as the season-ending championship for singles players on the ITF Wheelchair Tennis Tour. The eight players who qualify for the men's and women's events, and the six players who qualify for the quad event, are split into two groups of three or four. During this stage, players compete in a round-robin format (meaning players play against all the other players in their group). The two players with the best results in each group progress to the semifinals, where the winners of a group face the runners-up of the other group. This stage, however, is a knock-out stage.

=== Format ===
The Wheelchair Tennis Masters has a round-robin format, with six/eight players divided into two groups of three/four. The six/eight seeds are determined by the UNIQLO Wheelchair Tennis Rankings as they stood on 16 October 2017. All matches are the best of three tie-break sets, including the final.

== Qualified players ==
The following players qualified for the 2017 Wheelchair Tennis Masters, based upon rankings as at 16 October 2017. Players whose names are struck out qualified but did not participate and were replaced by the next highest ranking player.

Men's Singles

Rank	Player	Total points
1	(Argentina) Gustavo Fernández	4,601
2	(France) Stéphane Houdet	3,678
3	(United Kingdom) Alfie Hewett	3,642
4	(United Kingdom) Gordon Reid	3,488
5	(France) Nicolas Peifer	3,120
6	(Sweden) Stefan Olsson	2,931
7	(Belgium) Joachim Gérard	2,590
8	(Japan) Shingo Kunieda	2,346

Women's Singles

Rank	Player	Total points
1	(Japan) Yui Kamiji	4,730
2	(Netherlands) Diede de Groot	3,545
3	(Netherlands) ~~Jiske Griffioen~~	
4	(Germany) Sabine Ellerbrock	2,462
5	(Netherlands) Marjolein Buis	2,421
6	(Netherlands) Aniek van Koot	2,235
7	(United Kingdom) Lucy Shuker	1,753
8	(South Africa) Kgothatso Montjane	1,586
9	(Germany) Katharina Krüger	1,456

Quad Singles

Rank	Player	Total points
1	(United States) David Wagner	4,046
2	(United Kingdom) Andrew Lapthorne	3,393
3	(Australia) ~~Dylan Alcott~~	
4	(South Africa) Lucas Sithole	2,278
5	(Australia) Heath Davidson	2,135
6	(Netherlands) ~~Sam Schroder~~	
8	(United Kingdom) Antony Cotterill	1,207
9	(Brazil) Ymanitu Silva	1,002

== Head-to-head ==
2017 Wheelchair Tennis Masters – Men's singles

		Fernández	Hewett	Houdet	Reid	Peifer	Olsson	Gérard	Kunieda	Overall
1	Gustavo Fernández (ARG)		8–2	12–16	15–15	13–8	6–7	15–11	6–16	75–75
2	Alfie Hewett (GBR)	2–8		0–9	3–10	7–5	5–1	4–7	2–2	23–42
3	Stéphane Houdet (FRA)	16–12	9–0		22–13	27–12	26–14	24–13	11–38	135–102
4	Gordon Reid (GBR)	15–15	10–3	13–22		14–10	18–7	11–10	5–16	86–83
5	Nicolas Peifer (FRA)	8–13	5–7	12–17	10–14		8–12	14–18	2–25	59–106
6	Stefan Olsson (SWE)	7–6	1–5	14–26	7–18	12–8		9–6	1–23	51–92
7	Joachim Gérard (BEL)	11–15	7–4	13–24	10–11	18–14	6–9		3–13	68–90
8	Shingo Kunieda (JPN)	16–6	2–2	38–11	16–5	25–2	23–1	13–3		133–30

2017 Wheelchair Tennis Masters – Women's singles

		Kamiji	De Groot	Ellerbrock	Buis	Van Koot	Shuker	Montjane	Krüger	Overall
1	Yui Kamiji (JPN)		11–3	13–3	13–4	17–15	16–0	13–4	10–0	93–29
2	Diede de Groot (NED)	3–11		8–1	10–2	4–3	5–4	2–2	4–2	36–25
3	Sabine Ellerbrock (GER)	3–13	1–8		27–6	9–25	18–4	16–7	22–1	96–64
4	Marjolein Buis (NED)	4–13	2–10	6–27		5–19	16–9	26–1	8–4	67–83
5	Aniek van Koot (NED)	15–17	3–4	25–9	19–5		22–8	16–2	26–1	126–46
6	Lucy Shuker (GBR)	0–16	4–5	4–18	9–16	8–22		4–7	24–1	53–85
7	Kgothatso Montjane (RSA)	4–13	2–2	16–7	1–26	2–16	7–4		12–5	44–73
8	Katharina Krüger (GER)	0–10	2–4	1–22	4–8	1–26	1–24	5–12		14–106

2017 Wheelchair Tennis Masters – Quad singles

		Wagner	Lapthorne	Sithole	Davidson	Cotterill	Silva	Overall
1	David Wagner (USA)		36–13	31–8	6–2	14–0	3–0	90–23
2	Andrew Lapthorne (GBR)	13–36		14–11	3–0	7–0	6–0	43–47
3	Lucas Sithole (RSA)	8–31	11–14		1–1	15–0	3–0	38–46
4	Heath Davidson (AUS)	2–6	0–3	1–1		0–1	0–1	3–11
5	Antony Cotterill (GBR)	0–14	0–7	0–15	1–0		0–1	1–37
6	Ymanitu Silva (BRA)	0–3	0–6	0–3	1–0	1–0		2–12

== Champions ==
=== Men's singles ===
(United Kingdom) Alfie Hewett def. (United Kingdom) Gordon Reid, 6–3, 6–2

=== Women's singles ===
(Netherlands) Diede de Groot def. (Japan) Yui Kamiji, 7–5, 6–4

=== Quad singles ===
(United States) David Wagner def. (United Kingdom) Andrew Lapthorne, 6–1, 6–2

== See also ==
- ITF Wheelchair Tennis Tour
- 2017 Wheelchair Doubles Masters
