= 2016 Wheelchair Tennis Masters =

- Date: 30 November–4 December 2016
- Edition: 23rd (men/women) / 13th (quad)
- Category: ITF Masters Series
- Draw: 8M/8W/6Q
- Surface: Hard / indoor
- Location: Queen Elizabeth Olympic Park, London, United Kingdom
- Venue: Lee Valley Hockey and Tennis Centre

Champions

Men's singles
- (Belgium) Joachim Gérard

Women's singles
- (Netherlands) Jiske Griffioen

Quad singles
- (United States) David Wagner
- Wheelchair Tennis Masters

The 2016 Wheelchair Tennis Masters (also known as the 2016 NEC Wheelchair Tennis Masters for sponsorship reasons) is a wheelchair tennis tournament played at the Lee Valley Hockey and Tennis Centre in the Queen Elizabeth Olympic Park, London, United Kingdom, from 30 November to 4 December 2016. It is the season-ending event for the highest-ranked wheelchair tennis singles players on the 2016 ITF Wheelchair Tennis Tour.

== Tournament ==
The 2016 NEC Wheelchair Tennis Masters took place from 30 November to 4 December at the Lee Valley Hockey and Tennis Centre in London, United Kingdom. It was the 23rd edition of the tournament (13th for quad players). The tournament is run by the International Tennis Federation (ITF) and is part of the 2016 ITF Wheelchair Tennis Tour. The event takes place on indoor hard courts. It serves as the season-ending championships for singles players on the ITF Wheelchair Tennis Tour. The eight players who qualify for the men's and women's events, and six players who qualify for the quad event, are split into two groups of three or four. During this stage, players compete in a round-robin format (meaning players play against all the other players in their group). The two players with the best results in each group progress to the semifinals, where the winners of a group face the runners-up of the other group. This stage, however, is a knock-out stage.

=== Format ===
The Wheelchair Tennis Masters has a round-robin format, with six/eight players divided into two groups of three/four. The six/eight seeds are determined by the UNIQLO Wheelchair Tennis Rankings as they stood on 10 October 2016. All matches are the best of three tie-break sets, including the final. This year saw an increase in the number of players competing in the quad singles, with six players now completing for the title, up from four the previous year.

== Qualified players ==
The following players qualified for the 2016 Wheelchair Tennis Masters, based upon rankings as at 10 October 2016. Players whose names are struck out qualified but did not participate and were replaced by the next highest ranking player.

Men's singles

Rank	Player	Total points
1	(France) Stéphane Houdet	4,581
2	(United Kingdom) Gordon Reid	4,487
3	(Belgium) Joachim Gérard	4,213
4	(Argentina) Gustavo Fernández	3,346
5	(France) Nicolas Peifer	3,081
6	(Sweden) Stefan Olsson	2,133
7	(Japan) ~~Shingo Kunieda~~	
8	(Netherlands) Maikel Scheffers	3,642
9	(United Kingdom) Alfie Hewett	3,642

Women's singles

Rank	Player	Total points
1	(Netherlands) Jiske Griffioen	4,588
2	(Netherlands) Aniek van Koot	2,977
3	(Japan) Yui Kamiji	2,877
4	(Netherlands) Marjolein Buis	2,860
5	(United Kingdom) Jordanne Whiley	2,546
6	(Germany) Sabine Ellerbrock	2,586
7	(Netherlands) Diede de Groot	2,358
8	(United Kingdom) Lucy Shuker	1,651

Quad singles

Rank	Player	Total points
1	(Australia) ~~Dylan Alcott~~	
2	(United States) David Wagner	3,774
3	(South Africa) ~~Lucas Sithole~~	
4	(United Kingdom) Andrew Lapthorne	2,339
5	(Australia) Itay Erenlib	1,404
6	(South Korea) Kim Kyu-seung	1,298
10	(Israel) Shraga Weinberg	967
11	(United Kingdom) Antony Cotterill	849

== Champions ==
=== Men's singles ===
(Belgium) Joachim Gérard def. (United Kingdom) Gordon Reid, 4–6, 6–4, 6–4

=== Women's singles ===
(Netherlands) Jiske Griffioen def. (Japan) Yui Kamiji, 6–4, 6–4

=== Quad singles ===
(United States) David Wagner def. (Israel) Itay Erenlib, 6–4, 6–1

== See also ==
- ITF Wheelchair Tennis Tour
- 2016 Wheelchair Doubles Masters
