= 2016 Wheelchair Doubles Masters – Women's doubles =

Women's doubles
- 2016 Wheelchair Doubles Masters

Final
- Champions: (Netherlands) Diede de Groot (United Kingdom) Lucy Shuker
- Runners-up: (United Kingdom) Louise Hunt (United States) Dana Mathewson
- Score: 6–3, 4–6, 6–4

Events
men	women	quad
← 2015 ·	Wheelchair Doubles Masters	· 2017 →

Diede de Groot and Lucy Shuker defeated Louise Hunt and Dana Mathewson in the final, 6–3, 4–6, 6–4 to win the women's title at the 2016 Wheelchair Doubles Masters.

Jiske Griffioen and Aniek van Koot were the reigning champions, but did not compete.

== Seeds ==
1. (Netherlands) Diede de Groot / (United Kingdom) Lucy Shuker (champions)
2. (Germany) Katharina Krüger / (Netherlands) Michaela Spaanstra (semifinals)
3. (United Kingdom) Louise Hunt / (United States) Dana Mathewson (final)
4. (Italy) Giulia Capocci / (Italy) Marianna Lauro (round robin)
5. (France) Charlotte Famin / (United States) Emmy Kaiser (semifinals)
6. (Colombia) Angélica Bernal / (Chile) Francisca Mardones (round robin)

== Draw ==
=== Key ===
- Q = Qualifier
- WC = Wild card
- LL = Lucky loser
- Alt = Alternate
- ITF = ITF entry
- PR = Protected ranking
- SR = Special ranking
- SE = Special exempt
- JE = Junior exempt
- JR = Junior Accelerator Programme entrant
- CO = College Accelerator Programme entrant
- NG = Next Gen Accelerator Program entrant
- w/o = Walkover
- r = Retired
- d = Defaulted

=== Finals ===
Semifinals
1	(Netherlands) Diede de Groot (United Kingdom) Lucy Shuker	6	7
2	(Germany) Katharina Krüger (Netherlands) Michaela Spaanstra	2	5
3	(United Kingdom) Louise Hunt (United States) Dana Mathewson	6	6
5	(France) Charlotte Famin (United States) Emmy Kaiser	3	3

Final
1	(Netherlands) Diede de Groot (United Kingdom) Lucy Shuker	6	4	6
3	(United Kingdom) Louise Hunt (United States) Dana Mathewson	3	6	4
Third place
2	(Germany) Katharina Krüger (Netherlands) Michaela Spaanstra
5	(France) Charlotte Famin (United States) Emmy Kaiser

=== Group A ===
		(Netherlands) De Groot (United Kingdom) Shuker	(Italy) Capocci (Italy) Lauro	(France) Famin (United States) Kaiser	RR W–L	Set W–L	Game W–L	Standings
1	(Netherlands) Diede de Groot (United Kingdom) Lucy Shuker		6–0, 6–3	6–4, 6–1	2–0	4–0	24–8	1
4	(Italy) Giulia Capocci (Italy) Marianna Lauro	0–6, 3–6		5–7, 4–6	0–2	0–4	12–25	3
5	(France) Charlotte Famin (United States) Emmy Kaiser	4–6, 1–6	7–5, 6–4		1–1	2–2	18–21	2

=== Group B ===
		(Germany) Krüger (Netherlands) Spaanstra	(United Kingdom) Hunt (United States) Mathewson	(Colombia) Bernal (Chile) Mardones	RR W–L	Set W–L	Game W–L	Standings
2	(Germany) Katharina Krüger (Netherlands) Michaela Spaanstra		1–6, 6–7^{(1–7)}	6–3, 5–7, 7–5	1–1	2–3	25–28	2
3	(United Kingdom) Louise Hunt (United States) Dana Mathewson	6–1, 7–6^{(7–1)}		6–2, 6–0	2–0	4–0	25–9	1
6	(Colombia) Angélica Bernal (Chile) Francisca Mardones	3–6, 7–5, 5–7	2–6, 0–6		0–2	1–4	17–30	3
