= 2018 Wheelchair Tennis Masters =

- Date: 28 November–2 December 2018
- Edition: 25th (men/women) / 15th (quad)
- Category: ITF Masters Series
- Draw: 8M/8W/6Q
- Surface: Hard / indoor
- Location: Lake Nona, Orlando, Florida, United States
- Venue: USTA National Campus

Champions

Men's singles
- (Belgium) Joachim Gérard

Women's singles
- (Netherlands) Diede de Groot

Quad singles
- (Australia) Dylan Alcott
- Wheelchair Tennis Masters

The 2018 Wheelchair Tennis Masters (also known as the 2018 NEC Wheelchair Tennis Masters for sponsorship reasons) was a wheelchair tennis tournament played at the USTA National Campus in Lake Nona, Orlando, Florida, United States, from 28 November to 2 December 2018. It is the season-ending event for the highest-ranked wheelchair tennis singles players on the 2018 ITF Wheelchair Tennis Tour.

== Tournament ==
The 2018 NEC Wheelchair Tennis Masters took place from 28 November to 2 December at the USTA National Campus in Lake Nona, Orlando, Florida, United States. It was the 25th edition of the tournament (15th for quad players). The tournament was run by the International Tennis Federation (ITF) and was part of the 2018 ITF Wheelchair Tennis Tour. The event took place on indoor hard courts. It served as the season-ending championship for singles players on the ITF Wheelchair Tennis Tour.

The eight players who qualified for the men's and women's events, and six players who qualified for the quad event, were split into two groups of three or four. During this stage, players competed in a round-robin format (meaning players played against all the other players in their group). The two players with the best results in each group progressed to the semifinals, where the winners of a group faced the runners-up of the other group. This stage, however, was a knock-out stage.

=== Format ===
The Wheelchair Tennis Masters has a round-robin format, with six/eight players divided into two groups of three/four. The six/eight seeds are determined by the UNIQLO Wheelchair Tennis Rankings as they stood on 15 October 2018. All matches are the best of three tie-break sets, including the final.

== Qualified players ==
The following players qualified for the 2018 Wheelchair Tennis Masters, based upon rankings as at 16 October 2017. Players whose names are struck out qualified but did not participate and were replaced by the next highest ranking player.

Men's Singles

Rank	Player	Total points
1	(Japan) Shingo Kunieda	5,118
2	(United Kingdom) ~~Alfie Hewett~~	
3	(Argentina) Gustavo Fernández	3,574
4	(United Kingdom) Gordon Reid	3,051
5	(France) Stéphane Houdet	2,883
6	(Belgium) Joachim Gérard	2,883
7	(Sweden) Stefan Olsson	2,490
8	(France) Nicolas Peifer	2,246
9	(Japan) Takashi Sanada	2,006

Women's Singles

Rank	Player	Total points
1	(Netherlands) Diede de Groot	5,155
2	(Japan) Yui Kamiji	3,985
3	(Netherlands) Aniek van Koot	2,948
4	(Germany) Sabine Ellerbrock	2,561
5	(South Africa) Kgothatso Montjane	1,854
6	(Italy) Giulia Capocci	1,609
7	(Netherlands) Marjolein Buis	1,609
8	(United Kingdom) Lucy Shuker	1,458

Quad Singles

Rank	Player	Total points
1	(United States) David Wagner	4,206
2	(Australia) Dylan Alcott	3,869
3	(United Kingdom) Andrew Lapthorne	3,014
4	(Japan) Koji Sugeno	2,211
5	(Australia) Heath Davidson	2,062
6	(South Africa) Lucas Sithole	1,645

== Champions ==
=== Men's singles ===
(Belgium) Joachim Gérard def. (Japan) Shingo Kunieda, 6–1, 6–7(5), 6–3

=== Women's singles ===
(Netherlands) Diede de Groot def. (Japan) Yui Kamiji, 6–3, 7–5

=== Quad singles ===
(Australia) Dylan Alcott def. (United Kingdom) Andy Lapthorne, 3–6, 7–5, 6–4

== See also ==
- ITF Wheelchair Tennis Tour
- 2018 Wheelchair Doubles Masters
