= 2017 Wheelchair Doubles Masters – Women's doubles =

Women's doubles
- 2017 Wheelchair Doubles Masters

Final
- Champions: (Netherlands) Marjolein Buis (Netherlands) Diede de Groot
- Runners-up: (Germany) Sabine Ellerbrock (Netherlands) Aniek van Koot
- Score: 6–2, 6–4

Events
men	women	quad
← 2016 ·	Wheelchair Doubles Masters	· 2018 →

Defending champion Diede de Groot and her partner Marjolein Buis defeated Sabine Ellerbrock and Aniek van Koot in the final, 6–2, 6–4 to win the women's title at the 2017 Wheelchair Doubles Masters.

De Groot and Lucy Shuker were the defending champions, but did not compete together this year. Shuker partnered Dana Mathewson, but was defeated in the semifinals by Ellerbrock and van Koot.

== Seeds ==
1. (Netherlands) Marjolein Buis / (Netherlands) Diede de Groot (champions)
2. (United States) Dana Mathewson / (United Kingdom) Lucy Shuker (semifinals, third place)
3. (Germany) Sabine Ellerbrock / (Netherlands) Aniek van Koot (final)
4. (France) Charlotte Famin / (South Africa) Kgothatso Montjane (semifinals, fourth place)
5. (Italy) Giulia Capocci / (Germany) Katharina Krüger (round robin)
6. (United Kingdom) Louise Hunt / (Netherlands) Michaela Spaanstra (round robin)

== Draw ==
=== Key ===
- Q = Qualifier
- WC = Wild card
- LL = Lucky loser
- Alt = Alternate
- ITF = ITF entry
- PR = Protected ranking
- SR = Special ranking
- SE = Special exempt
- JE = Junior exempt
- JR = Junior Accelerator Programme entrant
- CO = College Accelerator Programme entrant
- NG = Next Gen Accelerator Program entrant
- w/o = Walkover
- r = Retired
- d = Defaulted

=== Finals ===
Semifinals
1	(Netherlands) Marjolein Buis (Netherlands) Diede de Groot	6	5	6
4	(France) Charlotte Famin (South Africa) Kgothatso Montjane	2	7	2
2	(United States) Dana Mathewson (United Kingdom) Lucy Shuker	3	4
3	(Germany) Sabine Ellerbrock (Netherlands) Aniek van Koot	6	6

Final
1	(Netherlands) Marjolein Buis (Netherlands) Diede de Groot	6	6
3	(Germany) Sabine Ellerbrock (Netherlands) Aniek van Koot	2	4
Third place
4	(France) Charlotte Famin (South Africa) Kgothatso Montjane	1	7	1
2	(United States) Dana Mathewson (United Kingdom) Lucy Shuker	6	5	6

=== Group A ===
		(Netherlands) Buis (Netherlands) De Groot	(Germany) Ellerbrock (Netherlands) Van Koot	(Italy) Capocci (Germany) Krüger	RR W–L	Set W–L	Game W–L	Standings
1	(Netherlands) Marjolein Buis (Netherlands) Diede de Groot		6–1, 6–4	6–2, 6–1	2–0	4–0	24–8	1
3	(Germany) Sabine Ellerbrock (Netherlands) Aniek van Koot	1–6, 4–6		6–2, 6–1	1–1	2–2	17–15	2
5	(Italy) Giulia Capocci (Germany) Katharina Krüger	2–6, 1–6	2–6, 1–6		0–2	0–4	6–24	3

=== Group B ===
		(United States) Mathewson (United Kingdom) Shuker	(France) Famin (South Africa) Montjane	(United Kingdom) Hunt (Netherlands) Spaanstra	RR W–L	Set W–L	Game W–L	Standings
2	(United States) Dana Mathewson (United Kingdom) Lucy Shuker		6–2, 2–6, 6–3	7–5, 6–3	2–0	4–1	27–19	1
4	(France) Charlotte Famin (South Africa) Kgothatso Montjane	2–6, 6–2, 3–6		6–4, 6–4	1–1	3–2	23–22	2
6	(United Kingdom) Louise Hunt (Netherlands) Michaela Spaanstra	5–7, 3–6	4–6, 4–6		0–2	0–4	16–25	3
