= Wheelchair tennis at the 2023 European Para Championships =

- Location: Rotterdam, Netherlands
- Start date: 8 August
- End date: 13 August
- Competitors: 52 from 17 nations

Wheelchair tennis at the 2023 European Para Championships in Rotterdam, Netherlands will be held between 8 and 13 August. There will be six events: three singles and three doubles events for men's, women's and quads divisions.

The winners of the men's and women's singles' events will qualify for the 2024 Summer Paralympics.

== Medal table ==
* Host nation (Netherlands)

Rank	Nation	Gold	Silver	Bronze	Total
1	Netherlands*	6	2	1	9
2	Great Britain	0	1	1	2
2	Spain	0	1	1	2
2	Turkey	0	1	1	2
5	France	0	1	0	1
6	Germany	0	0	2	2
Totals (6 entries)		6	6	6	18

== Medalists ==
Event	Gold	Silver	Bronze
Men's singles	Ruben Spaargaren; Netherlands	Martín de la Puente; Spain	Maikel Scheffers; Netherlands
Women's singles	Diede de Groot; Netherlands	Aniek van Koot; Netherlands	Lucy Shuker; Great Britain
Quad singles	Niels Vink; Netherlands	Sam Schröder; Netherlands	Ahmet Kaplan; Turkey
Men's doubles	Netherlands; Maikel Scheffers; Ruben Spaargaren	France; Nicolas Charrier; Geoffrey Jasiak	Spain; Martín de la Puente; Francisco Garcia Vena
Women's doubles	Netherlands; Diede de Groot; Aniek van Koot	Great Britain; Cornelia Oosthuizen; Lucy Shuker	Germany; Katharina Krüger; Britta Wend
Quad doubles	Netherlands; Sam Schröder; Niels Vink	Turkey; Uğur Altınel; Ahmet Kaplan	Germany; Marcus Laudan; Maximillian Laudan
