= Ahmet Kaplan =

Turkish wheelchair tennis player (born 2002)

- Country (sports): Turkey
- Born: 1 January 2002 (age 24) Akdeniz, Mersin, Turkey
- Plays: Right-handed,

Grand Slam singles results
- Australian Open: SF (2025, 2026)
- French Open: F (2026)
- Wimbledon: SF (2025)
- US Open: SF (2026)

Grand Slam doubles results
- Australian Open: QF (2024, 2025, 2026)
- French Open: F (2025)
- Wimbledon: SF (2024, 2025)
- US Open: SF (2025)
Medal record
Men's wheelchair tennis
Representing Turkey
European Para Championships
Bronze medal – third place	2023 Rotterdam	Quad singles
- Last updated on: 6 June 2024.

Ahmet Kaplan (born 1 January 2002) is a Turkish wheelchair tennis player who competes in the quad class of international level events.

== Career ==
=== 2022 ===
Kaplan started his wheelchair tennis career competing in the quad category in 2022. He won attention for his performance at tournaments organized by the Turkish Physically Disabled Sports Federation (Turkish: Türkiye Bedensel Engelliler Spor Federasyonu, TBESF).

He ranked second in the singles event of the Tenis Akıncılar Qualifying Tournament, and became champion in the doubles event at the International Aspendos Open in Antalya, Turkey. Moreover, he won the gold medal in the doubles event at the TBESF Open Tournament, took the silver medal in the doubles event of the International Antalya Open Tournament the same year.

With his performance, he rose from the 76th place to 53rd in the world ranking.

=== 2023 ===
He participated at the Johor Open 2023 Tennis Tournament in Malesia.

He took part at the 2023 US Open – Men's Wheelchair Tennis. He lost the first round match in the quad singles event to Dutch Sam Schröder. He and his teammate Uğur Altınel lost the quarter-final match in the quad doubles event against Tomáš Masaryk from Slovakia and Brazilian Ymanitu Silva.

He won the bronze medal in the quad singles event of the 2023 European Para Championships in Rotterdam, Netherlands.

=== 2024 ===
In January 2024, Kaplan took part at the Grand Slam level Australian Open – Men's Wheelchair Tennis. He lost the first round match of the quad singles event against Dutch Niels Vink. He and his Slovak teammate Tomáš Masaryk lost the first round match in the quad doubles event to Donald Ramphadi (South Africa) and Guy Sasson (Israel).

In June 2024, Kaplan won his first ITF title defeating Canadian Robert Shaw in the final match at the Open International de Royan 2024 Tennis Tournament in France.

In May 2024, Kaplan competed in the quad singles event of the Tram Barcelona Open. He defeated world's number 4 Donald Ramphadi from South Africa, but lost to world's number 1 in the final. He finished the tournament as runner-up.

As of end May 2024, Kaplan won four champion titles, and rose to the world rank 8 in quad singles. He helped the Turkey wheelchair tennis quad team become world number 2.

He missed out on a bronze medal at the 2024 Summer Paralympics in Quad singles, after being defeated by Guy Sasson of Israel.

== Personal life ==
Kaplan was born on 1 January 2002, and was raised and lives in Akdeniz, Mersin, southern Turkey.

At age eight, he was accidentally electrocuted in Akdeniz. Kaplan lost both his legs, which were surgically amputated due to the electric shock accident. In addition, he had severe damage to his hands, which resulted in the loss of a number of his fingers and partial motor dysfunction in his remaining digits.
