= 2016 Wheelchair Tennis Masters – Men's singles =

Men's singles
- 2016 Wheelchair Tennis Masters

Final
- Champion: (Belgium) Joachim Gérard
- Runner-up: (United Kingdom) Gordon Reid
- Score: 4–6, 6–4, 6–4

Events
men	women	quad
← 2015 ·	Wheelchair Tennis Masters	· 2017 →

Defending champion Joachim Gérard defeated Gordon Reid in the final, 4–6, 6–4, 6–4 to win the men's wheelchair tennis title at the 2016 Wheelchair Tennis Masters.

== Seeds ==
1. (France) Stéphane Houdet (semifinals, fourth place)
2. (United Kingdom) Gordon Reid (final)
3. (Belgium) Joachim Gérard (champion)
4. (Argentina) Gustavo Fernández (round robin)
5. (France) Nicolas Peifer (round robin)
6. (Sweden) Stefan Olsson (semifinals, third place)
7. (United Kingdom) Alfie Hewett (round robin)
8. (Netherlands) Maikel Scheffers (round robin)

== Draw ==
=== Key ===
- Q = Qualifier
- WC = Wild card
- LL = Lucky loser
- Alt = Alternate
- ITF = ITF entry
- PR = Protected ranking
- SR = Special ranking
- SE = Special exempt
- JE = Junior exempt
- JR = Junior Accelerator Programme entrant
- CO = College Accelerator Programme entrant
- NG = Next Gen Accelerator Program entrant
- w/o = Walkover
- r = Retired
- d = Defaulted

=== Finals ===
Semifinals
3	(Belgium) Joachim Gérard	7	6
6	(Sweden) Stefan Olsson	5	3
2	(United Kingdom) Gordon Reid	6	6
1	(France) Stéphane Houdet	2	1

Final
3	(Belgium) Joachim Gérard	4	6	6
2	(United Kingdom) Gordon Reid	6	4	4
Third place
6	(Sweden) Stefan Olsson	6	6
1	(France) Stéphane Houdet	3	1

=== Group A ===
		(France) Houdet	(Belgium) Gérard	(France) Peifer	(United Kingdom) Hewett	RR W–L	Set W–L	Game W–L	Standings
1	(France) Stéphane Houdet		5–7, 2–6	7–6^{(8–6)}, 6–4	4–6, 6–4, 6–2	2–1	4–3	36–35	2
3	(Belgium) Joachim Gérard	7–5, 6–2		6–2, 6–1	6–2, 6–1	3–0	6–0	37–13	1
5	(France) Nicolas Peifer	6–7^{(6–8)}, 4–6	2–6, 1–6		0–6, 3–6	0–3	0–6	16–37	4
7	(United Kingdom) Alfie Hewett	6–4, 4–6, 2–6	2–6, 1–6	6–0, 6–3		1–2	3–4	27–31	3

=== Group B ===
		(United Kingdom) Reid	(Argentina) Fernández	(Sweden) Olsson	(Netherlands) Scheffers	RR W–L	Set W–L	Game W–L	Standings
2	(United Kingdom) Gordon Reid		6–1, 6–2	6–2, 4–6, 6–2	6–1, 6–2	3–0	6–1	40–16	1
4	(Argentina) Gustavo Fernández	1–6, 2–6		2–6, 3–6	6–4, 6–3	1–2	2–4	20–31	4
6	(Sweden) Stefan Olsson	2–6, 6–4, 2–6	6–2, 6–3		2–6, 2–6	1–2	3–4	26–33	2
8	(Netherlands) Maikel Scheffers	1–6, 2–6	4–6, 3–6	6–2, 6–2		1–2	2–4	22–28	3
