= Tennis Masters =

Tennis Masters may refer to:

- ATP World Tour Finals, (previously known as Masters Grand Prix, Tennis Masters Cup, etc.), the year end championship event on the men's professional tennis tour
- ATP World Tour Masters 1000, a series of mid-season tennis tournaments, formerly known as the Tennis Masters Series
- Wheelchair Tennis Masters, the annual end-of-year wheelchair tennis tournament under the jurisdiction of the ITF
- Tennis Masters (video game), for the Nintendo DS
