= 2016 Wheelchair Tennis Masters – Quad singles =

Quad singles
- 2016 Wheelchair Tennis Masters

Final
- Champion: (United States) David Wagner
- Runner-up: (Israel) Itay Erenlib
- Score: 6–4, 6–1

Events
men	women	quad
← 2015 ·	Wheelchair Tennis Masters	· 2017 →

Four-time defending champion David Wagner defeated Itay Erenlib in the final, 6–4, 6–1 to win the quad wheelchair tennis title at the 2016 Wheelchair Tennis Masters. It was his ninth Masters singles title.

== Seeds ==
1. (United States) David Wagner (champion)
2. (United Kingdom) Andrew Lapthorne (semifinals, third place)
3. (Israel) Itay Erenlib (final)
4. (South Korea) Kim Kyu-seung (semifinals, fourth place)
5. (Israel) Shraga Weinberg (round robin)
6. (United Kingdom) Antony Cotterill (round robin)

== Draw ==
=== Key ===
- Q = Qualifier
- WC = Wild card
- LL = Lucky loser
- Alt = Alternate
- ITF = ITF entry
- PR = Protected ranking
- SR = Special ranking
- SE = Special exempt
- JE = Junior exempt
- JR = Junior Accelerator Programme entrant
- CO = College Accelerator Programme entrant
- NG = Next Gen Accelerator Program entrant
- w/o = Walkover
- r = Retired
- d = Defaulted

=== Finals ===
Semifinals
1	(United States) David Wagner	6	6
4	(South Korea) Kim Kyu-seung	2	1
2	(United Kingdom) Andrew Lapthorne	2	4
3	(Israel) Itay Erenlib	6	6

Final
1	(United States) David Wagner	6	6
3	(Israel) Itay Erenlib	4	1
Third place
4	(South Korea) Kim Kyu-seung	1	2
2	(United Kingdom) Andrew Lapthorne	6	6

=== Group A ===
		(United States) Wagner	(Israel) Erenlib	(Israel) Weinberg	RR W–L	Set W–L	Game W–L	Standings
1	(United States) David Wagner		7–5, 6–2	7–5, 6–2	2–0	4–0	26–14	1
3	(Israel) Itay Erenlib	5–7, 2–6		6–2, 6–0	1–1	2–2	19–15	2
5	(Israel) Shraga Weinberg	5–7, 2–6	2–6, 0–6		0–2	0–4	9–25	3

=== Group B ===
		(United Kingdom) Lapthorne	(South Korea) Kim	(United Kingdom) Cotterill	RR W–L	Set W–L	Game W–L	Standings
2	(United Kingdom) Andrew Lapthorne		6–2, 6–2	6–1, 6–1	2–0	4–0	24–6	1
4	(South Korea) Kim Kyu-seung	2–6, 2–6		7–5, 6–3	1–1	2–2	17–20	2
6	(United Kingdom) Antony Cotterill	1–6, 1–6	5–7, 3–6		0–2	0–4	10–25	3
