= 2016 Wheelchair Doubles Masters – Men's doubles =

Men's doubles
- 2016 Wheelchair Doubles Masters

Final
- Champions: (France) Stéphane Houdet (France) Nicolas Peifer
- Runners-up: (Argentina) Gustavo Fernández (Belgium) Joachim Gérard
- Score: 2–6, 6–3, 7–5

Events
men	women	quad
← 2015 ·	Wheelchair Doubles Masters	· 2017 →

Michaël Jeremiasz and Gordon Reid were the defending champions but withdrew in the round robin.

Stéphane Houdet and Nicolas Peifer defeated Gustavo Fernández and Joachim Gérard in the final, 2–6, 6–3, 7–5 to win the title.

== Seeds ==
1. (France) Stéphane Houdet / (France) Nicolas Peifer (champions)
2. (France) Michaël Jeremiasz / (United Kingdom) Gordon Reid (round robin, withdrew)
3. (Argentina) Gustavo Fernández / (Belgium) Joachim Gérard (final)
4. (United Kingdom) Alfie Hewett / (United Kingdom) David Phillipson (semifinals, third place)
5. (Brazil) Rafael Medeiros / (Brazil) Daniel Rodrigues (round robin)
6. (Brazil) Maurício Pommê / (Brazil) Carlos Santos (semifinals, fourth place)
7. (Italy) Antonio Cippo / (Italy) Ivan Tratter (round robin)
8. (Italy) Massimiliano Banci / (Italy) Silviu Culea (round robin)

== Draw ==
=== Key ===
- Q = Qualifier
- WC = Wild card
- LL = Lucky loser
- Alt = Alternate
- ITF = ITF entry
- PR = Protected ranking
- SR = Special ranking
- SE = Special exempt
- JE = Junior exempt
- JR = Junior Accelerator Programme entrant
- CO = College Accelerator Programme entrant
- NG = Next Gen Accelerator Program entrant
- w/o = Walkover
- r = Retired
- d = Defaulted

=== Finals ===
Semifinals
1	(France) Stéphane Houdet (France) Nicolas Peifer	6	6
6	(Brazil) Maurício Pommê (Brazil) Carlos Santos	0	0
3	(Argentina) Gustavo Fernández (Belgium) Joachim Gérard	6	6
4	(United Kingdom) Alfie Hewett (United Kingdom) David Phillipson	2	4

Final
1	(France) Stéphane Houdet (France) Nicolas Peifer	2	6	7
3	(Argentina) Gustavo Fernández (Belgium) Joachim Gérard	6	2	5
Third place
6	(Brazil) Maurício Pommê (Brazil) Carlos Santos	1	3
4	(United Kingdom) Alfie Hewett (United Kingdom) David Phillipson	6	6

=== Group A ===
		(France) Houdet (France) Peifer	(United Kingdom) Hewett (United Kingdom) Phillipson	(Brazil) Medeiros (Brazil) Rodrigues	(Italy) Cippo (Italy) Tratter	RR W–L	Set W–L	Game W–L	Standings
1	(France) Stéphane Houdet (France) Nicolas Peifer		6–0, 6–1	6–0, 6–1	6–0, 6–1	3–0	6–0	36–3	1
4	(United Kingdom) Alfie Hewett (United Kingdom) David Phillipson	0–6, 1–6		6–2, 6–1	6–3, 6–1	2–1	4–2	25–19	2
5	(Brazil) Rafael Medeiros (Brazil) Daniel Rodrigues	0–6, 1–6	2–6, 1–6		6–1, 6–2	1–2	2–4	16–27	3
7	(Italy) Antonio Cippo (Italy) Ivan Tratter	0–6, 1–6	3–6, 1–6	1–6, 2–6		0–3	0–6	8–36	4

=== Group B ===
		(France) Jeremiasz (United Kingdom) Reid	(Argentina) Fernández (Belgium) Gérard	(Brazil) Pommê (Brazil) Santos	(Italy) Banci (Italy) Culea	RR W–L	Set W–L	Game W–L	Standings
2	(France) Michaël Jeremiasz (United Kingdom) Gordon Reid		w/o	6–0, 6–2	w/o	1–0	2–0	12–2	X
3	(Argentina) Gustavo Fernández (Belgium) Joachim Gérard	w/o		6–1, 6–1	6–2, 6–0	2–0	4–0	24–4	1
6	(Brazil) Maurício Pommê (Brazil) Carlos Santos	0–6, 2–6	1–6, 1–6		6–3, 6–3	1–1	2–2	14–18	2
8	(Italy) Massimiliano Banci (Italy) Silviu Culea	w/o	2–6, 0–6	3–6, 3–6		0–2	0–4	8–24	3
