= 2016 Wheelchair Tennis Masters – Women's singles =

Women's singles
- 2016 Wheelchair Tennis Masters

Final
- Champion: (Netherlands) Jiske Griffioen
- Runner-up: (Japan) Yui Kamiji
- Score: 6–4, 6–4

Events
men	women	quad
← 2015 ·	Wheelchair Tennis Masters	· 2017 →

Defending champion Jiske Griffioen defeated Yui Kamiji in the final, 6–4, 6–4 to win the women's wheelchair tennis title at the 2016 Wheelchair Tennis Masters.

== Seeds ==
1. (Netherlands) Jiske Griffioen (champion)
2. (Netherlands) Aniek van Koot (round robin)
3. (Japan) Yui Kamiji (final)
4. (Netherlands) Marjolein Buis (semifinals, fourth place)
5. (United Kingdom) Jordanne Whiley (round robin, withdrew)
6. (Germany) Sabine Ellerbrock (round robin, withdrew)
7. (Netherlands) Diede de Groot (semifinals, third place)
8. (United Kingdom) Lucy Shuker (round robin)

== Draw ==
=== Key ===
- Q = Qualifier
- WC = Wild card
- LL = Lucky loser
- Alt = Alternate
- ITF = ITF entry
- PR = Protected ranking
- SR = Special ranking
- SE = Special exempt
- JE = Junior exempt
- JR = Junior Accelerator Programme entrant
- CO = College Accelerator Programme entrant
- NG = Next Gen Accelerator Program entrant
- w/o = Walkover
- r = Retired
- d = Defaulted

=== Finals ===
Semifinals
3	(Japan) Yui Kamiji	6	3	6
4	(Netherlands) Marjolein Buis	2	6	1
6	(Netherlands) Diede de Groot	1	6	6^{7}
1	(Netherlands) Jiske Griffioen	6	4	7^{9}

Final
3	(Japan) Yui Kamiji	4	4
1	(Netherlands) Jiske Griffioen	6	6
Third place
4	(Netherlands) Marjolein Buis	1	1
7	(Netherlands) Diede de Groot	6	6

=== Group A ===
		(Netherlands) Griffioen	(Japan) Kamiji	(Germany) Ellerbrock	(United Kingdom) Shuker	RR W–L	Set W–L	Game W–L	Standings
1	(Netherlands) Jiske Griffioen		3–6, 3–6	6–0, 6–2	7–5, 6–2	1–1	2–2	19–19	2
3	(Japan) Yui Kamiji	6–3, 6–3		w/o	7–6^{(7–5)}, 6–4	2–0	4–0	25–16	1
6	(Germany) Sabine Ellerbrock	0–6, 2–6	w/o		6–1, 3–6, 4–6	0–2	1–4	15–25	X
8	(United Kingdom) Lucy Shuker	5–7, 2–6	6–7^{(5–7)}, 4–6	1–6, 6–3, 6–4		0–2	0–4	17–26	3

=== Group B ===
		(Netherlands) Van Koot	(Netherlands) Buis	(United Kingdom) Whiley	(Netherlands) De Groot	RR W–L	Set W–L	Game W–L	Standings
2	(Netherlands) Aniek van Koot		4–6, ret.	7–5, 6–4	7–5, 6–4	1–1	2–2	17–21	3
4	(Netherlands) Marjolein Buis	6–4, ret.		w/o	4–6, 1–6	1–1	2–2	17–16	2
5	(United Kingdom) Jordanne Whiley	5–7, 4–6	w/o		w/o	0–1	0–2	9–13	X
7	(Netherlands) Diede de Groot	5–7, 4–6	6–4, 6–1	w/o		1–1	2–2	21–18	1
