= 2017 Wheelchair Tennis Masters – Women's singles =

Women's singles
- 2017 Wheelchair Tennis Masters

Final
- Champion: (Netherlands) Diede de Groot
- Runner-up: (Japan) Yui Kamiji
- Score: 7–5, 6–4

Events
men	women	quad
← 2016 ·	Wheelchair Tennis Masters	· 2018 →

Diede de Groot defeated Yui Kamiji in the final, 7–5, 6–4 to win the women's wheelchair tennis title at the 2017 Wheelchair Tennis Masters.

Jiske Griffioen was the two-time reigning champion, but retired from professional wheelchair tennis in October 2017.

== Seeds ==
1. (Japan) Yui Kamiji (final)
2. (Netherlands) Diede de Groot (champion)
3. (Germany) Sabine Ellerbrock (round robin)
4. (Netherlands) Marjolein Buis (semifinals, fourth place)
5. (Netherlands) Aniek van Koot (semifinals, third place)
6. (United Kingdom) Lucy Shuker (round robin)
7. (South Africa) Kgothatso Montjane (round robin)
8. (Germany) Katharina Krüger (round robin)

== Draw ==
=== Key ===
- Q = Qualifier
- WC = Wild card
- LL = Lucky loser
- Alt = Alternate
- ITF = ITF entry
- PR = Protected ranking
- SR = Special ranking
- SE = Special exempt
- JE = Junior exempt
- JR = Junior Accelerator Programme entrant
- CO = College Accelerator Programme entrant
- NG = Next Gen Accelerator Program entrant
- w/o = Walkover
- r = Retired
- d = Defaulted

=== Finals ===
Semifinals
1	(Japan) Yui Kamiji	6	6
4	(Netherlands) Marjolein Buis	3	2
2	(Netherlands) Diede de Groot	6	7^{7}
5	(Netherlands) Aniek van Koot	0	6^{5}

Final
1	(Japan) Yui Kamiji	5	4
2	(Netherlands) Diede de Groot	7	6
Third place
4	(Netherlands) Marjolein Buis	2	5^{r}
5	(Netherlands) Aniek van Koot	6	5

=== Group A ===
		(Japan) Kamiji	(Germany) Ellerbrock	(Netherlands) Van Koot	(Germany) Krüger	RR W–L	Set W–L	Game W–L	Standings
1	(Japan) Yui Kamiji		5–7, 6–2, 6–3	6–1, 6–0	6–1, 6–1	3–0	6–1	41–15	1
3	(Germany) Sabine Ellerbrock	7–5, 2–6, 3–6		6–7^{(5–7)}, 1–2, ret.	6–4, 6–4	1–2	3–4	31–38	3
5	(Netherlands) Aniek van Koot	1–6, 0–6	7–6^{(7–5)}, 2–1, ret.		6–1, 6–2	2–1	4–2	26–22	2
8	(Germany) Katharina Krüger	1–6, 1–6	4–6, 4–6	1–6, 2–6		0–3	0–6	13–36	4

=== Group B ===
		(Netherlands) De Groot	(Netherlands) Buis	(United Kingdom) Shuker	(South Africa) Montjane	RR W–L	Set W–L	Game W–L	Standings
2	(Netherlands) Diede de Groot		6–3, 7–6^{(7–3)}	6–1, 6–0	7–5, 6–1	3–0	6–0	38–16	1
4	(Netherlands) Marjolein Buis	3–6, 6–7^{(3–7)}		6–2, 6–7^{(4–7)}, 6–2	6–3, 7–6^{(10–8)}	2–1	4–3	40–33	2
6	(United Kingdom) Lucy Shuker	1–6, 0–6	2–6, 7–6^{(7–4)}, 2–6		1–6, 2–6	0–3	1–6	15–42	4
7	(South Africa) Kgothatso Montjane	5–7, 1–6	3–6, 6–7^{(8–10)}	6–1, 6–2		1–2	2–4	27–29	3
