= Dorrie Timmermans =

Dutch wheelchair tennis player (born 1955)

- Full name: Dorrie Timmermans-van Hall
- Country (sports): Netherlands
- Residence: Arnhem, Netherlands
- Born: 1 May 1955 (age 69); Tolkamer, Netherlands
- Turned pro: 2005
- Retired: 2018
- Plays: Right-handed

Singles
- Career titles: 9
- Highest ranking: No. 19 (6 May 2013)

Other tournaments
- Paralympic Games: QF (2008)

Doubles
- Career titles: 16
- Highest ranking: No. 31 (25 July 2005)

Other doubles tournaments
- Paralympic Games: SF (2008)

Dorrie Timmermanns-Van Hall (born 1 May 1965) is a retired Dutch wheelchair tennis player who competed in international level events. Her lower limbs were amputated due to complications from meningococcal sepsis. Her highest achievement was reaching the semifinals at the quads' doubles at the 2008 Summer Paralympics when she partnered with Bas van Erp.
