= 2017 Wheelchair Doubles Masters – Quad doubles =

Quad doubles
- 2017 Wheelchair Doubles Masters

Final
- Champions: (United States) Nick Taylor (United States) David Wagner
- Runners-up: (United Kingdom) Antony Cotterill (United Kingdom) Andrew Lapthorne
- Score: 6–4, 6–3

Events
men	women	quad
← 2016 ·	Wheelchair Doubles Masters	· 2018 →

Nick Taylor and David Wagner defeated the defending champions Antony Cotterill and Andrew Lapthorne in a rematch of the previous year's final, 6–4, 6–3 to win the quad title at the 2017 Wheelchair Doubles Masters.

== Seeds ==
1. (United Kingdom) Antony Cotterill / (United Kingdom) Andrew Lapthorne (final)
2. (United States) Nick Taylor / (United States) David Wagner (champions)
3. (Australia) Heath Davidson / (South Africa) Lucas Sithole (round robin, third place)
4. (United States) Greg Hasterok / (South Korea) Kim Kyu-seung (round robin, fourth place)

== Draw ==
=== Key ===
- Q = Qualifier
- WC = Wild card
- LL = Lucky loser
- Alt = Alternate
- ITF = ITF entry
- PR = Protected ranking
- SR = Special ranking
- SE = Special exempt
- JE = Junior exempt
- JR = Junior Accelerator Programme entrant
- CO = College Accelerator Programme entrant
- NG = Next Gen Accelerator Program entrant
- w/o = Walkover
- r = Retired
- d = Defaulted

=== Finals ===
Final
1	(United Kingdom) Antony Cotterill (United Kingdom) Andrew Lapthorne	4	3
2	(United States) Nick Taylor (United States) David Wagner	6	6

Third place
3	(Australia) Heath Davidson (South Africa) Lucas Sithole	3	6	6
4	(United States) Greg Hasterok (South Korea) Kim Kyu-seung	6	2	1

=== Round robin ===
		(United Kingdom) Cotterill (United Kingdom) Lapthorne	(United States) Taylor (United States) Wagner	(Australia) Davidson (South Africa) Sithole	(United States) Hasterok (South Korea) Kim	RR W–L	Set W–L	Game W–L	Standings
1	(United Kingdom) Antony Cotterill (United Kingdom) Andrew Lapthorne		5–7, 7–5, 6–3	6–3, 7–5	6–2, 6–2	3–0	6–1	43–27	1
2	(United States) Nick Taylor (United States) David Wagner	7–5, 5–7, 3–6		6–2, 3–6, 6–1	6–2, 6–0	2–1	5–3	42–29	2
3	(Australia) Heath Davidson (South Africa) Lucas Sithole	3–6, 5–7	2–6, 6–3, 1–6		6–1, 6–0	1–2	3–4	29–29	3
4	(United States) Greg Hasterok (South Korea) Kim Kyu-seung	2–6, 2–6	2–6, 0–6	1–6, 0–6		0–3	0–6	7–36	4
