= 2017 Wheelchair Tennis Masters – Quad singles =

Quad singles
- 2017 Wheelchair Tennis Masters

Final
- Champion: (United States) David Wagner
- Runner-up: (United Kingdom) Andrew Lapthorne
- Score: 6–1, 6–2

Events
men	women	quad
← 2016 ·	Wheelchair Tennis Masters	· 2018 →

Five-time defending champion David Wagner defeated Andrew Lapthorne in the final, 6–1, 6–2 to win the quad wheelchair tennis title at the 2017 Wheelchair Tennis Masters. It was his tenth Masters singles title.

== Seeds ==
1. (United States) David Wagner (champion)
2. (United Kingdom) Andrew Lapthorne (final)
3. (South Africa) Lucas Sithole (semifinals, third place)
4. (Australia) Heath Davidson (semifinals, fourth place)
5. (United Kingdom) Antony Cotterill (round robin)
6. (Brazil) Ymanitu Silva (round robin)

== Draw ==
=== Key ===
- Q = Qualifier
- WC = Wild card
- LL = Lucky loser
- Alt = Alternate
- ITF = ITF entry
- PR = Protected ranking
- SR = Special ranking
- SE = Special exempt
- JE = Junior exempt
- JR = Junior Accelerator Programme entrant
- CO = College Accelerator Programme entrant
- NG = Next Gen Accelerator Program entrant
- w/o = Walkover
- r = Retired
- d = Defaulted

=== Finals ===
Semifinals
1	(United States) David Wagner	6	6
4	(Australia) Heath Davidson	1	0
2	(United Kingdom) Andrew Lapthorne	7	7
3	(South Africa) Lucas Sithole	5	5

Final
1	(United States) David Wagner	6	6
2	(United Kingdom) Andrew Lapthorne	1	2
Third place
4	(Australia) Heath Davidson	3	2
3	(South Africa) Lucas Sithole	6	6

=== Group A ===
		(United States) Wagner	(South Africa) Sithole	(Brazil) Silva	RR W–L	Set W–L	Game W–L	Standings
1	(United States) David Wagner		6–3, 6–1	6–4, 6–4	2–0	4–0	24–12	1
3	(South Africa) Lucas Sithole	3–6, 1–6		6–4, 6–4	1–1	2–2	16–20	2
6	(Brazil) Ymanitu Silva	4–6, 4–6	4–6, 4–6		0–2	0–4	16–24	3

=== Group B ===
		(United Kingdom) Lapthorne	(Australia) Davidson	(United Kingdom) Cotterill	RR W–L	Set W–L	Game W–L	Standings
2	(United Kingdom) Andrew Lapthorne		6–2, 7–5	6–1, 6–4	2–0	4–0	25–12	1
4	(Australia) Heath Davidson	2–6, 5–7		4–6, 6–1, 6–0	1–1	2–3	23–20	2
6	(United Kingdom) Antony Cotterill	1–6, 4–6	6–4, 1–6, 0–6		0–2	1–4	12–28	3
