= 2006 Wheelchair Tennis Masters =

Tennis tournament

Poster for the 2006 event

The 2006 Wheelchair Tennis Masters was held in the Frans Otten Stadion in Amsterdam, Netherlands, between November 14 and November 19, 2006.

== Men's singles ==
The results in the men's singles competition were as follows:

=== Contenders ===
#	Rank*	Player	Country
1.	1	Shingo Kunieda	Japan
2.	2	Robin Ammerlaan	Netherlands
3.	3	Michaël Jérémiasz	France
4.	4	Satoshi Saida	Japan
5.	5	Tadeusz Kruszelnicki	Poland
6.	6	Ronald Vink	Netherlands
7.	7	Martin Legner	Austria
8.	8	Maikel Scheffers	Netherlands

=== Group stage ===
==== Group A ====
Robin Ammerlaan	(6-3, 4–6, 6–4)	Tadeusz Kruszelnicki
Satoshi Saida	(6-0, 6–0)	Martin Legner
Tadeusz Kruszelnicki	(6-4, 6–4)	Martin Legner
Robin Ammerlaan	(6-4, 6–1)	Satoshi Saida
Satoshi Saida	(6-2, 6–4)	Tadeusz Kruszelnicki
Robin Ammerlaan	(6-2, 6–1)	Martin Legner

#	Seed	Player	Matches W–L	Sets W–L
1.	2	Robin Ammerlaan	3–0	6–1
2.	4	Satoshi Saida	2–1	4–2
3.	5	Tadeusz Kruszelnicki	1–2	3–4
4.	7	Martin Legner	0–3	0–6

==== Group B ====
Shingo Kunieda	(6-2, 6–0)	Ronald Vink
Michaël Jérémiasz	(6-1, 6–1)	Maikel Scheffers
Shingo Kunieda	(6-3, 6–1)	Michaël Jérémiasz
Ronald Vink	(7-6, 6–1)	Maikel Scheffers
Shingo Kunieda	(6-1, 6–4)	Maikel Scheffers
Michaël Jérémiasz	(6-3, 6–3)	Ronald Vink

#	Seed	Player	Matches W–L	Sets W–L
1.	1	Shingo Kunieda	3–0	6–0
2.	3	Michaël Jérémiasz	2–1	4–2
3.	6	Ronald Vink	1–2	2–4
4.	8	Maikel Scheffers	0–3	0–6

=== 7th/8th place match ===
Maikel Scheffers	(6-3, 6–3)	Martin Legner

=== 5th/6th place match ===
Tadeusz Kruszelnicki	(3-6, 4–6)	Ronald Vink

=== Semifinals ===
Robin Ammerlaan	(6-7, 6–1, 6–2)	Michaël Jérémiasz
Shingo Kunieda	(1-6, 6–4, 6–1)	Satoshi Saida

=== 3rd/4th place match ===
Michaël Jérémiasz	(6-3, 6–3)	Satoshi Saida

=== Final ===
Robin Ammerlaan	(7-6, 7–6)	Shingo Kunieda

== Men's quads ==
=== Contenders ===
#	Rank*	Player	Country
1.	1	Peter Norfolk	Great Britain
2.	2	David Wagner	United States
3.	3	Nicholas Taylor	United States
4.	4	Giuseppe Polidori	Italy

=== Group stage ===
Peter Norfolk	(6-3, 6–1)	Nicholas Taylor
David Wagner	(6-2, 6–2)	Giuseppe Polidori
Peter Norfolk	(6-2, 6–2)	David Wagner
Nicholas Taylor	(2-6, 6–2, 6–3)	Giuseppe Polidori
David Wagner	(6-2, 6–1)	Nicholas Taylor
Peter Norfolk	(6-2, 6–2)	Giuseppe Polidori

#	Seed	Player	Matches W – L	Sets W – L
1.	1	Peter Norfolk	3 – 0	6 – 0
2.	2	David Wagner	2 – 1	4 – 2
3.	3	Nicholas Taylor	1 – 2	2 – 5
4.	4	Giuseppe Polidori	0 – 3	1 – 6

=== 3rd/4th place match ===
Nicholas Taylor	(7-6, 3–6, 4–6)	Giuseppe Polidori

=== Final ===
Peter Norfolk	(6-1, 6–4)	David Wagner

== Women's singles ==
=== Contenders ===
#	Rank*	Player	Country
1.	1	Esther Vergeer	Netherlands
2.	2	Florence Gravellier	France
3.	3	Sharon Walraven	Netherlands
4.	4	Jiske Griffioen	Netherlands
5.	5	Korie Homan	Netherlands
6.	6	Maaike Smit	Netherlands
7.	7	Hong Young-suk	South Korea
8.	8	Karin Suter-Erath	Switzerland

=== Group stage ===
==== Group A ====
Esther Vergeer	(6-0, 6–3)	Korie Homan
Sharon Walraven	(6-4, 6–3)	Hong Young-suk
Esther Vergeer	(6-1, 6–4)	Sharon Walraven
Korie Homan	(6-0, 6–1)	Hong Young-suk
Esther Vergeer	(6-0, 6–1)	Hong Young-suk
Sharon Walraven	(2-6, 6–4, 6–2)	Korie Homan

#	Seed	Player	Matches W – L	Sets W – L
1.	1	Esther Vergeer	3 – 0	6 – 0
2.	3	Sharon Walraven	2 – 1	4 – 3
3.	5	Korie Homan	1 – 2	3 – 4
4.	7	Hong Young-suk	0 – 3	0 – 6

==== Group B ====
Florence Gravellier	(6-3, 6–2)	Maaike Smit
Jiske Griffioen	(7-5, 7–6)	Karin Suter-Erath
Florence Gravellier	(3-6, 6–3, 6–0)	Jiske Griffioen
Maaike Smit	(6-4, 6–2)	Karin Suter-Erath
Jiske Griffioen	(6-4, 7–5)	Maaike Smit
Florence Gravellier	(6-3, 6–1)	Karin Suter-Erath

#	Seed	Player	Matches W – L	Sets W – L
1.	2	Florence Gravellier	3 – 0	6 – 1
2.	4	Jiske Griffioen	2 – 1	5 – 2
3.	6	Maaike Smit	1 – 2	2 – 4
4.	8	Karin Suter-Erath	0 – 3	0 – 6

=== 7th/8th place match ===
Hong Young-suk	(7-6, 6–4)	Karin Suter-Erath

=== 5th/6th place match ===
Korie Homan	(6-2, 6–2)	Maaike Smit

=== Semifinals ===
Esther Vergeer	(6-3, 6–0)	Jiske Griffioen
Florence Gravellier	(4-6, 4–6)	Sharon Walraven

=== 3rd/4th place match ===
Jiske Griffioen	(6-3, 7–5)	Florence Gravellier

=== Final ===
Esther Vergeer	(6-1, 6–2)	Sharon Walraven
