= 2016 Wheelchair Doubles Masters – Quad doubles =

Quad doubles
- 2016 Wheelchair Doubles Masters

Final
- Champions: (United Kingdom) Antony Cotterill (United Kingdom) Andrew Lapthorne
- Runners-up: (United States) Nick Taylor (United States) David Wagner
- Score: 7–5, 1–6, 6–4

Events
men	women	quad
← 2015 ·	Wheelchair Doubles Masters	· 2017 →

Antony Cotterill and Andrew Lapthorne defeated the five-time defending champions Nick Taylor and David Wagner in the final, 7–5, 1–6, 6–4 to win the quad title at the 2016 Wheelchair Doubles Masters.

== Seeds ==
1. (United States) Nick Taylor / (United States) David Wagner (final)
2. (United Kingdom) Antony Cotterill / (United Kingdom) Andrew Lapthorne (champions)
3. (United States) Greg Hasterok / (Brazil) Ymanitu Silva (round robin, fourth place)
4. (Canada) Mika Ishikawa / (South Korea) Kim Kyu-seung (round robin, third place)

== Draw ==
=== Key ===
- Q = Qualifier
- WC = Wild card
- LL = Lucky loser
- Alt = Alternate
- ITF = ITF entry
- PR = Protected ranking
- SR = Special ranking
- SE = Special exempt
- JE = Junior exempt
- JR = Junior Accelerator Programme entrant
- CO = College Accelerator Programme entrant
- NG = Next Gen Accelerator Program entrant
- w/o = Walkover
- r = Retired
- d = Defaulted

=== Finals ===
Final
1	(United States) Nick Taylor (United States) David Wagner	5	6	3
2	(United Kingdom) Antony Cotterill (United Kingdom) Andrew Lapthorne	7	1	6

Third place
3	(United States) Greg Hasterok (Brazil) Ymanitu Silva	4	4
4	(Canada) Mika Ishikawa (South Korea) Kim Kyu-seung	6	6

=== Round robin ===
		(United States) Taylor (United States) Wagner	(United Kingdom) Cotterill (United Kingdom) Lapthorne	(United States) Hasterok (Brazil) Silva	(Canada) Ishikawa (South Korea) Kim	RR W–L	Set W–L	Game W–L	Standings
1	(United States) Nick Taylor (United States) David Wagner		6–3, ret.	6–1, 2–6, 6–0	6–1, 6–1	3–0	6–1	38–12	1
2	(United Kingdom) Antony Cotterill (United Kingdom) Andrew Lapthorne	3–6, ret.		6–1, 6–3	6–2, 6–0	2–1	4–1	27–18	2
3	(United States) Greg Hasterok (Brazil) Ymanitu Silva	1–6, 6–2, 0–6	1–6, 3–6		7–6^{(7–2)}, 4–6, 6–1	1–2	5–3	28–39	3
4	(Canada) Mika Ishikawa (South Korea) Kim Kyu-seung	1–6, 1–6	2–6, 0–6	6–7^{(2–7)}, 6–4, 1–6		0–3	1–6	17–41	4
