= 2009 Wheelchair Tennis Masters =

- Date: 18–22 November
- Category: ITF Masters Series
- Location: Amsterdam

Champions

Wheelchair men's singles
- (Netherlands) Maikel Scheffers

Wheelchair women's singles
- (Netherlands) Esther Vergeer

Wheelchair quad singles
- (United Kingdom) Peter Norfolk
← 2008 ·	Wheelchair Tennis Masters	· 2010 →

The 2009 Wheelchair Tennis Masters (Also known as the 2009 NEC Wheelchair Tennis Masters for sponsor reasons). It was held on hard courts between the 18 and 22 November 2009. The tournament was held in Amsterdam and was part of the NEC Wheelchair Tennis Tour, under the Masters Series category of events.

== Qualification ==
The top eight in men's and women's competition of the year qualified for the Wheelchair tennis masters. The top four from the Quad category also qualified for this event.
