= 2017 Wheelchair Doubles Masters – Men's doubles =

Men's doubles
- 2017 Wheelchair Doubles Masters

Final
- Champions: (United Kingdom) Alfie Hewett (United Kingdom) Gordon Reid
- Runners-up: (France) Stéphane Houdet (France) Nicolas Peifer
- Score: 1–6, 6–4, 7–5

Events
men	women	quad
← 2016 ·	Wheelchair Doubles Masters	· 2018 →

Alfie Hewett and Gordon Reid defeated the defending champions Stéphane Houdet and Nicolas Peifer in the final, 1–6, 6–4, 7–5 to win the title.

== Seeds ==
1. (France) Stéphane Houdet / (France) Nicolas Peifer (final)
2. (United Kingdom) Alfie Hewett / (United Kingdom) Gordon Reid (champions)
3. (Argentina) Gustavo Fernández / (Netherlands) Maikel Scheffers (semifinals, fourth place)
4. (Belgium) Joachim Gérard / (Sweden) Stefan Olsson (semifinals, third place)
5. (France) Frédéric Cattanéo / (South Africa) Evans Maripa (round robin)
6. (Spain) Daniel Caverzaschi / (Spain) Martín de la Puente (round robin)
7. (Poland) Kamil Fabisiak / (Austria) Martin Legner (round robin)
8. (Netherlands) Carlos Anker / (Netherlands) Ruben Spaargaren (round robin)

== Draw ==
=== Key ===
- Q = Qualifier
- WC = Wild card
- LL = Lucky loser
- Alt = Alternate
- ITF = ITF entry
- PR = Protected ranking
- SR = Special ranking
- SE = Special exempt
- JE = Junior exempt
- JR = Junior Accelerator Programme entrant
- CO = College Accelerator Programme entrant
- NG = Next Gen Accelerator Program entrant
- w/o = Walkover
- r = Retired
- d = Defaulted

=== Finals ===
Semifinals
1	(France) Stéphane Houdet (France) Nicolas Peifer	6	6
4	(Belgium) Joachim Gérard (Sweden) Stefan Olsson	2	4
2	(United Kingdom) Alfie Hewett (United Kingdom) Gordon Reid	6	6
3	(Argentina) Gustavo Fernández (Netherlands) Maikel Scheffers	1	2

Final
1	(France) Stéphane Houdet (France) Nicolas Peifer	1	6	7
2	(United Kingdom) Alfie Hewett (United Kingdom) Gordon Reid	6	4	5
Third place
4	(Belgium) Joachim Gérard (Sweden) Stefan Olsson	6	7
3	(Argentina) Gustavo Fernández (Netherlands) Maikel Scheffers	1	5

=== Group A ===
		(France) Houdet (France) Peifer	(Argentina) Fernández (Netherlands) Scheffers	(Spain) Caverzaschi (Spain) De la Puente	(Netherlands) Anker (Netherlands) Spaargaren	RR W–L	Set W–L	Game W–L	Standings
1	(France) Stéphane Houdet (France) Nicolas Peifer		6–2, 6–4	6–1, 6–1	6–2, 6–0	3–0	6–0	36–10	1
3	(Argentina) Gustavo Fernández (Netherlands) Maikel Scheffers	2–6, 4–6		6–2, 6–2	6–0, 6–1	2–1	4–2	30–17	2
6	(Spain) Daniel Caverzaschi (Spain) Martín de la Puente	1–6, 1–6	2–6, 2–6		6–0, 6–3	1–2	2–4	18–27	3
8	(Netherlands) Carlos Anker (Netherlands) Ruben Spaargaren	2–6, 0–6	0–6, 1–6	0–6, 3–6		0–3	0–6	6–36	4

=== Group B ===
		(United Kingdom) Hewett (United Kingdom) Reid	(Belgium) Gérard (Sweden) Olsson	(France) Cattanéo (South Africa) Maripa	(Poland) Fabisiak (Austria) Legner	RR W–L	Set W–L	Game W–L	Standings
2	(United Kingdom) Alfie Hewett (United Kingdom) Gordon Reid		2–6, 6–4, 6–4	6–0, 6–1	6–4, 6–1	3–0	6–1	38–20	1
4	(Belgium) Joachim Gérard (Sweden) Stefan Olsson	6–2, 4–6, 4–6		6–3, 6–2	6–0, 6–1	2–1	5–2	38–20	2
5	(France) Frédéric Cattanéo (South Africa) Evans Maripa	0–6, 1–6	3–6, 2–6		6–0, 6–1	1–2	2–4	18–25	3
7	(Poland) Kamil Fabisiak (Austria) Martin Legner	4–6, 1–6	0–6, 1–6	0–6, 1–6		0–2	0–6	7–36	4
