= 2017 Wheelchair Tennis Masters – Men's singles =

Men's singles
- 2017 Wheelchair Tennis Masters

Final
- Champion: (United Kingdom) Alfie Hewett
- Runner-up: (United Kingdom) Gordon Reid
- Score: 6–3, 6–2

Events
men	women	quad
- Wheelchair Tennis Masters

Alfie Hewett defeated Gordon Reid in the final, 1–6, 6–4, 7–5 to win the men's wheelchair tennis title at the 2017 Wheelchair Tennis Masters.

Joachim Gérard was the two-time defending champion, but was defeated by Hewett in the semifinals.

== Seeds ==
1. (Argentina) Gustavo Fernández (round robin)
2. (United Kingdom) Alfie Hewett (champion)
3. (France) Stéphane Houdet (round robin)
4. (United Kingdom) Gordon Reid (final)
5. (France) Nicolas Peifer (round robin)
6. (Sweden) Stefan Olsson (round robin)
7. (Belgium) Joachim Gérard (semifinals, third place)
8. (Japan) Shingo Kunieda (semifinals, fourth place)

== Draw ==
Key

- Q = Qualifier
- WC = Wild card
- LL = Lucky loser
- Alt = Alternate
- ITF = ITF entry
- PR = Protected ranking
- SR = Special ranking
- SE = Special exempt
- JE = Junior exempt
- JR = Junior Accelerator Programme entrant
- CO = College Accelerator Programme entrant
- NG = Next Gen Accelerator Program entrant
- w/o = Walkover
- r = Retired
- d = Defaulted

=== Finals ===
Semifinals
7	(Belgium) Joachim Gérard	0	2
3	(United Kingdom) Alfie Hewett	6	6
8	(Japan) Shingo Kunieda	5	4
4	(United Kingdom) Gordon Reid	7	6

Final
3	(United Kingdom) Alfie Hewett	6	6
4	(United Kingdom) Gordon Reid	3	2
Third place
7	(Belgium) Joachim Gérard	6	7
8	(Japan) Shingo Kunieda	3	5

=== Group A ===
		(Argentina) Fernández	(United Kingdom) Reid	(France) Peifer	(Belgium) Gérard	RR W–L	Set W–L	Game W–L	Standings
1	(Argentina) Gustavo Fernández		3–6, 6–1, 5–7	6–3, 6–2	7–5, 2–6, 6–7^{(4–7)}	1–2	4–4	41–37	3
4	(United Kingdom) Gordon Reid	6–3, 1–6, 7–5		3–6, 6–4, 6–3	3–6, 5–7	2–1	4–4	37–40	2
5	(France) Nicolas Peifer	3–6, 2–6	6–3, 4–6, 3–6		0–6, 6–1, 5–7	0–3	2–6	29–41	4
7	(Belgium) Joachim Gérard	5–7, 6–2, 7–6^{(7–4)}	6–3, 7–5	6–0, 1–6, 7–5		3–0	6–2	45–34	1

=== Group B ===
		(United Kingdom) Hewett	(France) Houdet	(Sweden) Olsson	(Japan) Kunieda	RR W–L	Set W–L	Game W–L	Standings
2	(United Kingdom) Alfie Hewett		2–6, 7–6^{(10–8)}, 6–4	7–6^{(7–5)}, 3–6, 6–3	6–2, 4–6, 2–6	2–1	5–4	43–45	2
3	(France) Stéphane Houdet	6–2, 6–7^{(8–10)}, 4–6		6–2, 6–3	4–6, 3–6	1–2	3–4	35–32	3
6	(Sweden) Stefan Olsson	6–7^{(5–7)}, 6–3, 3–6	2–6, 3–6		6–4, 4–6, 3–6	0–3	2–6	34–44	4
8	(Japan) Shingo Kunieda	2–6, 6–4, 6–2	6–4, 6–3	4–6, 6–4, 6–4		3–0	6–2	42–33	1
