= Wheelchair tennis classification =

Disability sport classification system

Wheelchair tennis classification is the classification system for wheelchair tennis designed to bring fair play for all competitors. Classification is overseen by the International Paralympic Committee (IPC) and carried out by the International Tennis Federation (ITF).

== Definition ==
Wheelchair tennis classification at the Paralympic Games is the basis for determining who can compete in the sport, and within which class. It is used for the purposes of establishing fair competition. Entry is eligible to male and female athletes with a physical disability that prevents them from fairly competing with able-bodied players.

== Governance ==
Governance in the sport is overseen by the International Paralympic Committee (IPC) and carried out by the International Tennis Federation (ITF) who publish classification rules and regulations annually. The sport was the first one to have the able-bodied organisation handle classification when ITF took over governance of the sport in 1998.

== History ==
Wheelchair tennis was developed in 1976 by Jeff Minnenbraker and Brad Parks. By the early 1990s, wheelchair tennis classification had moved away from medical based ones to a functional classification system. In 1992, the International Paralympic Committee formally took control of governance for disability sport. Because of issues in objectively identifying functionality that plagued the post Barcelona Games, the IPC unveiled plans to develop a new classification system in 2003. This classification system went into effect in 2007, and defined ten different disability types that were eligible to participate on the Paralympic level. It required that classification be sport specific, and served two roles. The first was that it determined eligibility to participate in the sport and that it created specific groups of sportspeople who were eligible to participate and in which class. The IPC left it up to International Federations to develop their own classification systems within this framework, with the specification that their classification systems use an evidence based approach developed through research.

Classification for the 2012 Summer Paralympics was based on the 2009 International Tennis Federation's Wheelchair Tennis Handbook.

== Eligibility ==
As of 2012, people with physical disabilities are eligible to compete in this sport. Male and female athletes with a physical disability (as defined by the IPC) can compete in Quad (tetraplegia) or Open divisions. To be eligible to play wheelchair tennis, a competitor must have a "medically diagnosed, permanent, mobility-related physical disability" and then meet one of several criteria which includes "Neurological deficit at the S1 level or proximal", "anklylosis, severe arthrosis or joint replacement" in the lower half, "amputation of any lower-extremity joint proximal to the metatarsophalangeal joint" or a functional disability equivalent to the above. Lower leg amputation competitors are allowed to participate in wheelchair sport following classification rules for them based on functional mobility.

== Classes ==
There are two classes for the sport, the tetraplegic class (commonly known as Quad class) and the open classification. Athletes are classified into these classes as follows:

- Open. Competitors in this class have lower limb impairment but normal upper limb and hand-use function.
- Quad. Competitors in this class have impairment to both upper and lower limbs. Their ability to apply control to the wheelchair and racket is more limited than those in the Open class.

The rules for wheelchair tennis are similar to able-bodied tennis except that the ball is allowed to bounce twice so long as the first bounce falls within the court. Use of a power-wheelchair may be allocated to athletes who are unable to manoeuvre a manual chair due to their disability.

== Process ==
For a wheelchair tennis athlete to compete at the Paralympic Games, international classification by an International Classification Panel is required. All competitors must hold a current Wheelchair Tennis International Player Identification Number (IPIN) from the International Tennis Federation. and agree to abide by the Tennis Anti-Doping Programme and Fitness Control. For the 2012 Paralympic Games, athletes should have an official ranking on the ITF Wheelchair Tennis Singles World Ranking List, as well as a participation history in one or more ITF Wheelchair Tennis competitions within the period 1 January 2010 to 31 January 2012.

In most countries, classification for national competitions is done through the local national Paralympic committee. For Australian competitors in this sport, the sport and classification is managed the national sport federation with support from the Australian Paralympic Committee. There are three types of classification available for Australian competitors: Provisional, national and international. The first is for club level competitions, the second for state and national competitions, and the third for international competitions.

== At the Paralympic Games ==
Wheelchair tennis was first played at the Paralympics in 1992. At the 1992 Summer Paralympics, wheelchair disability types were eligible to participate, with classification being run through an independent classifier. Competition at the 2012 Summer Paralympics will be held at Eton Manor (Olympic Park), from 1 September to 8 September. It is estimated that between 64 and 80 men and 32 to 48 women will compete in six medal events. The maximum number of competitors per country allowed is as follows:

- Quad doubles: one team of two competitors
- Men's and women's doubles: two teams of two competitors
- Quad singles: three competitors
- Men's and women's singles: four competitors

For the 2016 Summer Paralympics in Rio, the International Paralympic Committee had a zero classification at the Games policy. This policy was put into place in 2014, with the goal of avoiding last minute changes in classes that would negatively impact athlete training preparations. All competitors needed to be internationally classified with their classification status confirmed prior to the Games, with exceptions to this policy being dealt with on a case-by-case basis.

== Prominent athletes ==
David Hall is Australia's highest medal winner at the Paralympics in wheelchair tennis – with one gold, three silver and two bronze medals spanning across three Paralympic Games.

In the Paralympics Esther Vergeer won four gold medals in singles as well as three gold and one silver medals in the doubles.

In the Paralympics Shingo Kunieda won three gold medals in singles as well as one gold and two bronze medals in the doubles.

In the Paralympics David Wagner won one gold and two bronze medals in singles as well as three gold medals in the doubles.

== Future ==
Going forward, disability sport's major classification body, the International Paralympic Committee, is working on improving classification to be more of an evidence-based system as opposed to a performance-based system so as not to punish elite athletes whose performance makes them appear in a higher class alongside competitors who train less.
