= Camozzi =

Camozzi may refer to:

== People ==
Camozzi is an Italian surname. Notable people with the surname include:

- Gabriele Camozzi (1823–1869) – Italian patriot and politician
- Giovanni Battista Camozzi (1515–1581) – Italian scholar
- Giovanni Battista Camozzi Vertova (1818–1906) – Senator of the Kingdom of Italy, brother of Gabriele
- Ivano Camozzi (born 1961) – former Italian alpine skier
- Pietro Camozzi (1940–2017) – Italian footballer and coach, midfielder
- Agostina Camozzi (1435–1458), Italian Roman Catholic nun
- Brian Camozzi (born 1991), American mixed martial artist
- Chris Camozzi (born 1986), American kickboxer and mixed martial artist

== Other ==
- Camozzi – noble family from Asola
- Camozzi-Vertova Castle – historic residence of the Camozzi-Vertova family

== See also ==
- Villa Camozzi
