= Wheelchair Tennis Masters =

Pair of tennis events

The Wheelchair Tennis Masters refers to a pair of end of year tennis events for wheelchair athletes held on an annual basis under the jurisdiction of the World Tennis.

The Wheelchair Tennis Masters for singles is an end-of-year wheelchair tennis tournament, broadly analogous to the ATP Tour and WTA Championship finals. Initiated in 1994 for men and women's singles, and 2004 for quad players (quad tennis being a mixed gender sport) both genders compete at the same event.

The top eight players (men and women), and the top six quad players, are invited to the Masters. The ranking is based on their ranking after the US Open is played. The round robin format is comparable to that which operates at the ATP World Tour Finals and WTA Championships. The Masters is described as the official ITF year-end singles championship.

Separately, the Wheelchair Tennis Masters for doubles performs a similar function for men's, women's and quad doubles players. Initiated in 2000 (2003 for quad players), each year the top eight men’s pairings, top six women's pairings and top four quad pairings are accepted into the draw in which all three events follow a round-robin format.

== NEC Wheelchair Tennis Single Masters ==
From 1994 until 1999 the NEC Wheelchair Tennis Masters took place in the Indoor Sport Centre in Eindhoven, Netherlands. From 2000 until 2005 the NEC Wheelchair Tennis Masters took place in Amersfoort, Netherlands. From 2006 through 2010, the singles tournament took place in the Frans Otten Stadium in Amsterdam. The tournament was renamed the NEC Singles Masters in 2010, and moved to Mechelen, Belgium from 2011 to 2012. In 2013, the NEC Singles Masters took place at the Marguerite Tennis Pavilion in Mission Viejo, California. From 2014 to 2016 the NEC Singles Masters were held in London, UK, while in 2017 the tournament moved to Loughborough, UK. From 2018 the Masters is held in Orlando, Florida. Esther Vergeer holds the record, having won 14 titles between 1998 and 2011, followed by David Wagner with 11.

=== Results singles ===
==== Men ====
Location	Year	Champion	Runner-up	Score
Eindhoven
Eindhoven	1994	(United States) Randy Snow	(United States) Stephen Welch	6–2, 6–4
Eindhoven	1995	(France) Laurent Giammartini	(United States) Randy Snow	7–5, 4–6, 6–4
Eindhoven	1996	(United States) Stephen Welch	(France) Laurent Giammartini	6–4, 2–6, 6–4
Eindhoven	1997	(Germany) Kai Schrameyer	(United States) Stephen Welch	4–6, 7–5, 6–0
Eindhoven	1998	(Netherlands) Ricky Molier	(France) Laurent Giammartini	7–5, 7–5
Eindhoven	1999	(Netherlands) Robin Ammerlaan	(Austria) Martin Legner	7–5, 6–1
Amersfoort	2000	(Netherlands) Robin Ammerlaan	(Netherlands) Ricky Molier	7–6^{(11–9)}, 6–1
Amersfoort	2001	(Netherlands) Ricky Molier	(Netherlands) Robin Ammerlaan	6–0, 6–7^{(1–7)}, 6–1
Amersfoort	2002	(Australia) David Hall	(Netherlands) Robin Ammerlaan	2–6, 6–3, 6–4
Amersfoort	2003	(Netherlands) Robin Ammerlaan	(United States) Stephen Welch	6–3, 6–4
Amersfoort	2004	(Australia) David Hall	(France) Michaël Jeremiasz	6–2, 6–4
Amersfoort	2005	(Netherlands) Robin Ammerlaan	(France) Michaël Jeremiasz	6–2, 6–3
Amsterdam	2006	(Netherlands) Robin Ammerlaan	(Japan) Shingo Kunieda	7–6^{(7–2)}, 7–6^{(7–5)}
Amsterdam	2007	(Netherlands) Robin Ammerlaan	(France) Michaël Jeremiasz	7–6^{(10–8)}, 5–7, 6–0
Amsterdam	2008	(Sweden) Stefan Olsson	(Netherlands) Robin Ammerlaan	6–3, 4–6, 6–3
Amsterdam	2009	(Netherlands) Maikel Scheffers	(Netherlands) Robin Ammerlaan	2–6, 6–4, 6–2
Amsterdam	2010	(Sweden) Stefan Olsson	(France) Stéphane Houdet	6–4, 7–5
Mechelen	2011	(France) Stéphane Houdet	(Netherlands) Maikel Scheffers	6–4, 7–6^{(7–2)}
Mechelen	2012	(Japan) Shingo Kunieda	(Netherlands) Maikel Scheffers	6–2, 4–6, 6–2
Mission Viejo	2013	(Japan) Shingo Kunieda	(Belgium) Joachim Gérard	6–0 7–6^{(11–9)}
London	2014	(Japan) Shingo Kunieda	(France) Nicolas Peifer	6–1 6–1
London	2015	(Belgium) Joachim Gérard	(Japan) Shingo Kunieda	7–5, 2–6, 6–3
London	2016	(Belgium) Joachim Gérard	(United Kingdom) Gordon Reid	4–6, 6–4, 6–4
Loughborough	2017	(United Kingdom) Alfie Hewett	(United Kingdom) Gordon Reid	6–3, 6–2
Lake Nona	2018	(Belgium) Joachim Gérard	(Japan) Shingo Kunieda	6–1, 6–7^{(5–7)}, 6–3
Lake Nona	2019	(Belgium) Joachim Gérard	(United Kingdom) Alfie Hewett	6–3, 6–2
Lake Nona	2020	no competition due to the COVID-19 pandemic		
Lake Nona	2021	(United Kingdom) Alfie Hewett	(Argentina) Gustavo Fernandez	7–6^{(8–6)}, 4–6, 6–4
Oss	2022	(Japan) Tokito Oda	(United Kingdom) Alfie Hewett	6–4, 6–3
Barcelona	2023	(United Kingdom) Alfie Hewett	(Argentina) Gustavo Fernandez	4–6, 6–1, 6–3
Amsterdam	2024	(Japan) Tokito Oda	(United Kingdom) Gordon Reid	2–6, 6–0, 6–2
Huzhou	2025	(Japan) Tokito Oda	(United Kingdom) Alfie Hewett	6–1, 6–1

==== Women ====
Location	Year	Champion	Runner-up	Score
Eindhoven
Eindhoven	1994	(Netherlands) Monique Kalkman	(Netherlands) Chantal Vandierendonck	6–1, 6–4
Eindhoven	1995	(Netherlands) Monique Kalkman	(Australia) Daniela Di Toro	6–1, 6–2
Eindhoven	1996	(Netherlands) Chantal Vandierendonck	(Australia) Daniela Di Toro	6–1, 6–3
Eindhoven	1997	(Netherlands) Maaike Smit	(Netherlands) Monique Kalkman	6–3, 4–6, 7–5
Eindhoven	1998	(Netherlands) Esther Vergeer	(Netherlands) Maaike Smit	6–0, 7–6
Eindhoven	1999	(Netherlands) Esther Vergeer	(Netherlands) Maaike Smit	6–0, 6–1
Amersfoort	2000	(Netherlands) Esther Vergeer	(Netherlands) Djoke van Marum	6–1, 6–3
Amersfoort	2001	(Netherlands) Esther Vergeer	(Netherlands) Maaike Smit	6–2, 6–3
Amersfoort	2002	(Netherlands) Esther Vergeer	(Netherlands) Sonja Peters	4–6, 6–4, 7–6^{(7–3)}
Amersfoort	2003	(Netherlands) Esther Vergeer	(Netherlands) Sharon Walraven	6–1, 6–3
Amersfoort	2004	(Netherlands) Esther Vergeer	(Netherlands) Jiske Griffioen	6–2, 6–0
Amersfoort	2005	(Netherlands) Esther Vergeer	(France) Florence Gravellier	6–4, 6–2
Amsterdam	2006	(Netherlands) Esther Vergeer	(Netherlands) Sharon Walraven	6–1, 6–2
Amsterdam	2007	(Netherlands) Esther Vergeer	(Netherlands) Korie Homan	6–3, 6–4
Amsterdam	2008	(Netherlands) Esther Vergeer	(Netherlands) Korie Homan	6–2, 3–6, 6–0
Amsterdam	2009	(Netherlands) Esther Vergeer	(Netherlands) Korie Homan	2–6, 7–6^{(7–5)}, 6–2
Amsterdam	2010	(Netherlands) Esther Vergeer	(Australia) Daniela Di Toro	6–2, 6–1
Mechelen	2011	(Netherlands) Esther Vergeer	(Netherlands) Aniek van Koot	6–1, 6–2
Mechelen	2012	(Netherlands) Jiske Griffioen	(Netherlands) Aniek van Koot	6–2, 6–2
Mission Viejo	2013	(Japan) Yui Kamiji	(Netherlands) Jiske Griffioen	7–6^{(7–3)}, 3–6, 6–4
London	2014	(Netherlands) Aniek van Koot	(Netherlands) Jiske Griffioen	3–6, 6–4, 6–1
London	2015	(Netherlands) Jiske Griffioen	(Germany) Sabine Ellerbrock	6–2, 6–2
London	2016	(Netherlands) Jiske Griffioen	(Japan) Yui Kamiji	6–4, 6–4
Loughborough	2017	(Netherlands) Diede De Groot	(Japan) Yui Kamiji	7–5, 6–4
Lake Nona	2018	(Netherlands) Diede de Groot	(Japan) Yui Kamiji	6–3, 7–5
Lake Nona	2019	(Netherlands) Diede de Groot	(Japan) Yui Kamiji	6–2, 6–3
Lake Nona	2020	no competition due to the COVID-19 pandemic		
Lake Nona	2021	(Netherlands) Diede de Groot	(Japan) Yui Kamiji	6–3, 2–6, 6–2
Oss	2022	(Netherlands) Diede de Groot	(Japan) Yui Kamiji	6–2, 6–2
Barcelona	2023	(Netherlands) Diede de Groot	(Japan) Yui Kamiji	1–6, 6–1, 6–4
Amsterdam	2024	(Japan) Yui Kamiji	(Netherlands) Aniek van Koot	0–6, 6–4, 6–4
Huzhou	2025	(Japan) Yui Kamiji	(China) Li Xiaohui	6–2, 6–2

==== Quads ====
Location	Year	Champion	Runner-up	Score
Amersfoort	2004	(United States) David Wagner	(Netherlands) Bas van Erp	6–2, 6–3
Amersfoort	2005	(United States) David Wagner	(United States) Nick Taylor	6–2, 6–1
Amsterdam	2006	(United Kingdom) Peter Norfolk	(United States) David Wagner	6–2, 6–2
Amsterdam	2007	(United States) David Wagner	(Sweden) Johan Andersson	6–1, 3–6, 6–2
Amsterdam	2008	(United States) David Wagner	(United Kingdom) Peter Norfolk	6–4, 6–1
Amsterdam	2009	(United Kingdom) Peter Norfolk	(United States) David Wagner	6–2, 7–5
Amsterdam	2010	(United Kingdom) Peter Norfolk	(United States) David Wagner	6–3, 7–6^{(7–3)}
Mechelen	2011	(Israel) Noam Gershony	(United Kingdom) Andrew Lapthorne	0–6, 6–3, 7–5
Mechelen	2012	(United States) David Wagner	(United Kingdom) Andrew Lapthorne	6–4, 6–2
Mission Viejo	2013	(United States) David Wagner	(South Africa) Lucas Sithole	0–6, 6–2, 6–2
London	2014	(United States) David Wagner	(Australia) Dylan Alcott	6–4, 7–5
London	2015	(United States) David Wagner	(South Africa) Lucas Sithole	7–6^{(8–6)}, 6–4
London	2016	(United States) David Wagner	(Israel) Itay Erenlib	6–4, 6–1
Loughborough	2017	(United States) David Wagner	(United Kingdom) Andrew Lapthorne	6–1, 6–2
Lake Nona	2018	(Australia) Dylan Alcott	(United Kingdom) Andrew Lapthorne	3–6, 7–5, 6–4
Lake Nona	2019	(United States) David Wagner	(Netherlands) Niels Vink	6–3, 6–4
Lake Nona	2020	no competition due to the COVID-19 pandemic		
Lake Nona	2021	(Netherlands) Niels Vink	(Netherlands) Sam Schroder	6–4, 6–7, 4–6
Netherlands	2022	(Netherlands) Sam Schroder	(Netherlands) Niels Vink	6–3, 6–0
Barcelona	2023	(Netherlands) Niels Vink	(Netherlands) Sam Schroder	6–4, 6–2
Amsterdam	2024	(Netherlands) Niels Vink	(Netherlands) Sam Schroder	4–6, 6–3, 6–4
Huzhou	2025	(Netherlands) Sam Schroder	(Israel) Guy Sasson	6–4, 6–3

== Wheelchair Doubles Masters ==
From 2000 until 2001 the Wheelchair Tennis Doubles Masters took place alongside the singles event in Amersfoort. From 2002 until 2003 the Wheelchair Tennis Doubles Masters took place at the Invacare World Team Cup by Camozzi in Tremosine, Italy. From 2003 until 2004 the Camozzi company became sponsor of this tournament and it took place in Brescia, Italy. Since 2005 the event took place in the Centro Sportivo Mario Mongodi close to Bergamo, Italy. In 2011 the title sponsorship was taken up by Invacare in a two-year deal and the 2011 tournament was held in the Frans Otten stadium in Amsterdam. From 2013 to 2016, the ITF Wheelchair Doubles Masters took place at the Marguerite Tennis Pavilion in Mission Viejo, California In 2017 and 2018, the event took place in Bemmel, Netherlands. As of 2018, Taylor and Wagner are the most successful partnership across all categories, with a total of 11 titles.

=== Results doubles ===
==== Men ====
Location	Year	Champion	Runner-up	Score
NEC Wheelchair Tennis Masters
Amersfoort	2000	(Netherlands) Ricky Molier (United States) Stephen Welch	(Netherlands) Robin Ammerlaan (Netherlands) Eric Stuurman	6–3, 6–1
Amersfoort	2001	(Czech Republic) Miroslav Brychta (Austria) Martin Legner	(Poland) Tadeusz Kruszelnicki (United Kingdom) Jayant Mistry	6–3, 6–2
Tremosine	2002	(Germany) Kai Schrameyer (United States) Stephen Welch	(Austria) Martin Legner (Japan) Satoshi Saida	3–6, 6–4, 6–2
Tremosine	2003	(Austria) Martin Legner (Japan) Satoshi Saida	(France) Michaël Jeremiasz (United Kingdom) Jayant Mistry	6–3, 7–6^{(7–5)}
Brescia	2004	(Austria) Martin Legner (Japan) Satoshi Saida	(France) Michaël Jeremiasz (United Kingdom) Jayant Mistry	6–1, 3–6, 6–3
Camozzi Wheelchair Doubles Masters
Bergamo	2005	(France) Michaël Jeremiasz (United Kingdom) Jayant Mistry	(Austria) Martin Legner (Japan) Satoshi Saida	6–1, 6–2
Bergamo	2006	(Netherlands) Maikel Scheffers (Netherlands) Ronald Vink	(France) Michaël Jeremiasz (United Kingdom) Jayant Mistry	6–2, 3–6, 6–3
Bergamo	2007	(France) Stéphane Houdet (France) Michaël Jeremiasz	(Netherlands) Maikel Scheffers (Netherlands) Ronald Vink	2–6, 6–4, 6–2
Bergamo	2008	(Sweden) Stefan Olsson (Sweden) Peter Wikstrom	(Netherlands) Maikel Scheffers (Netherlands) Ronald Vink	6–4, 2–6, 7–5
Bergamo	2009	(Netherlands) Maikel Scheffers (Netherlands) Ronald Vink	(Netherlands) Robin Ammerlaan (France) Stéphane Houdet	6–1, 3–6, 6–0
Bergamo	2010	(Netherlands) Maikel Scheffers (Netherlands) Ronald Vink	(Netherlands) Robin Ammerlaan (France) Stéphane Houdet	7–6^{(7–2)}, 6–4
Invacare Wheelchair Doubles Masters
Amsterdam	2011	(Netherlands) Tom Egberink (France) Michaël Jeremiasz	(Netherlands) Robin Ammerlaan (France) Stéphane Houdet	6–4, 6–2
Amsterdam	2012	(France) Stéphane Houdet (Japan) Shingo Kunieda	(United Kingdom) Gordon Reid (Netherlands) Ronald Vink	6–7^{(6–8)}, 6–1, 6–2
Mission Viejo	2013	(France) Stéphane Houdet (United Kingdom) Gordon Reid	(France) Michaël Jeremiasz (France) Nicolas Peifer	6–3, 6–3
Mission Viejo	2014	(Belgium) Joachim Gérard (France) Stéphane Houdet	(France) Michaël Jeremiasz (United Kingdom) Gordon Reid	6–4, 6–1
Mission Viejo	2015	(France) Michaël Jeremiasz (United Kingdom) Gordon Reid	(Belgium) Joachim Gérard (France) Stéphane Houdet	6–1, 6–4
UNIQLO Wheelchair Doubles Masters
Mission Viejo	2016	(France) Stéphane Houdet (France) Nicolas Peifer	(Argentina) Gustavo Fernández (Belgium) Joachim Gérard	2–6, 6–2, 7–5
Bemmel	2017	(United Kingdom) Alfie Hewett (United Kingdom) Gordon Reid	(France) Stéphane Houdet (France) Nicolas Peifer	1–6, 6–4, 7–5
Bemmel	2018	(France) Stéphane Houdet (France) Nicolas Peifer	(Belgium) Joachim Gérard (Sweden) Stefan Olsson	1–6, 6–3, 7–6^{(7–3)}
Orlando	2019	(France) Stéphane Houdet (France) Nicolas Peifer	(Belgium) Joachim Gérard (Sweden) Stefan Olsson	6–1, 6–2
Orlando	2020	no competition due to the COVID-19 pandemic		
Orlando	2021	(United Kingdom) Alfie Hewett (United Kingdom) Gordon Reid	(France) Stéphane Houdet (France) Nicolas Peifer	6–4, 6–1
Oss	2022	(Spain) Martín de la Puente (Argentina) Gustavo Fernández	(Netherlands) Tom Egberink (Netherlands) Ruben Spaargarent	6–1, 6–2
Barcelona	2023	(United Kingdom) Alfie Hewett (United Kingdom) Gordon Reid	(Spain) Martín de la Puente (Argentina) Gustavo Fernández	3–6, 6–2^{(10–6)}
Arnhem	2024	(Spain) Martin de la Puente (Belgium) Joachim Gérard	(United Kingdom) Alfie Hewett (United Kingdom) Gordon Reid	6–4, 6–2
Huzhou	2025	(Spain) Martín de la Puente (Netherlands) Ruben Spaaragent	(United Kingdom) Alfie Hewett (United Kingdom) Gordon Reid	6–1, 4–6, 14–12

http://www.itftennis.com/wheelchair/

==== Women ====
Location	Year	Champion	Runner-up	Score
NEC Wheelchair Tennis Masters
Amersfoort	2000	(Australia) Daniela di Toro (Netherlands) Maaike Smit	(Netherlands) Esther Vergeer (Netherlands) Sonja Peters	6–4, 6–4
Amersfoort	2001	(Netherlands) Maaike Smit (Netherlands) Esther Vergeer	(Netherlands) Betty Klave (Netherlands) Djoke van Marum	7–5, 7–5
Tremosine	2002	(Netherlands) Maaike Smit (Netherlands) Esther Vergeer	(Netherlands) Betty Klave (Netherlands) Djoke van Marum	7–6^{(7–2)}, 6–3
Tremosine	2003	(Netherlands) Maaike Smit (Netherlands) Esther Vergeer	(Netherlands) Jiske Griffioen (Netherlands) Sharon Walraven	6–2, 6–2
Brescia	2004	(Netherlands) Jiske Griffioen (Netherlands) Korie Homan	(Belgium) Brigitte Ameryckx (Netherlands) Sharon Walraven	6–4, 6–2
Camozzi Wheelchair Doubles Masters
Bergamo	2005	(Netherlands) Jiske Griffioen (Netherlands) Esther Vergeer	(France) Florence Gravellier (Netherlands) Maaike Smit	6–1, 6–2
Bergamo	2006	(Netherlands) Jiske Griffioen (Netherlands) Esther Vergeer	(Netherlands) Korie Homan (United Kingdom) Lucy Shuker	6–3, 6–3
Bergamo	2007	(Netherlands) Jiske Griffioen (Netherlands) Esther Vergeer	(Netherlands) Korie Homan (Netherlands) Maaike Smit	6–3, 6–3
Bergamo	2008	(Netherlands) Jiske Griffioen (Netherlands) Esther Vergeer	(France) Florence Gravellier (United Kingdom) Lucy Shuker	6–3, 6–0
Bergamo	2009	(Netherlands) Korie Homan (Netherlands) Esther Vergeer	(Netherlands) Jiske Griffioen (Netherlands) Aniek van Koot	7–6^{(7–2)}, 6–4
Bergamo	2010	(Netherlands) Aniek van Koot (Netherlands) Sharon Walraven	(United Kingdom) Lucy Shuker (United Kingdom) Jordanne Whiley	7–5, 6–3
Invacare Wheelchair Doubles Masters
Amsterdam	2011	(Netherlands) Esther Vergeer (Netherlands) Sharon Walraven	(Netherlands) Jiske Griffioen (Netherlands) Aniek van Koot	3–6, 7–5, 6–4
Amsterdam	2012	(Netherlands) Jiske Griffioen (Netherlands) Aniek van Koot	(Germany) Sabine Ellerbrock (Japan) Yui Kamiji	6–0, 6–3
Mission Viejo	2013	(Japan) Yui Kamiji (United Kingdom) Jordanne Whiley	(Germany) Sabine Ellerbrock (South Africa) Kgothatso Montjane	6–4, 6–1
Mission Viejo	2014	(Japan) Yui Kamiji (United Kingdom) Jordanne Whiley	(United Kingdom) Louise Hunt (Germany) Katharina Krüger	6–2, 6–1
Mission Viejo	2015	(Netherlands) Jiske Griffioen (Netherlands) Aniek van Koot	(Japan) Yui Kamiji (United Kingdom) Jordanne Whiley	7–6^{(7–1)}, 6–4
UNIQLO Wheelchair Doubles Masters
Mission Viejo	2016	(Netherlands) Diede de Groot (United Kingdom) Lucy Shuker	(Japan) Yui Kamiji (United Kingdom) Jordanne Whiley	6–3, 4–6, 6–4
Bemmel	2017	(Netherlands) Marjolein Buis (Netherlands) Diede de Groot	(Germany) Sabine Ellerbrock (Netherlands) Aniek van Koot	6–2, 6–4
Bemmel	2018	(Netherlands) Marjolein Buis (Netherlands) Aniek van Koot	(United Kingdom) Louise Hunt (United States) Dana Mathewson	6–3, 6–1
Orlando	2019	(Netherlands) Diede de Groot (Netherlands) Aniek van Koot	(United Kingdom) Lucy Shuker (United Kingdom) Jordanne Whiley	6–2, 6–2
Orlando	2020	no competition due to the COVID-19 pandemic		
Orlando	2021	(Netherlands) Diede de Groot (Netherlands) Aniek van Koot	(Japan) Momoko Ohtani (China) Zhu Zhenzhen	6–3, 6–3
Oss	2022	(Netherlands) Diede de Groot (Netherlands) Aniek van Koot	(Netherlands) Jiske Griffioen (Japan) Momoko Ohtani	6–0, 6–4
Barcelona	2023	(Japan) Yui Kamiji (South Africa) Kgothatso Montjane	(Netherlands) Diede de Groot (Netherlands) Jiske Griffioen	6–2, 6–1
Arnhem	2024	(Netherlands) Jiske Griffioen (Netherlands) Aniek Van Koot	(China) Wang Ziying (China) Zhu Zhenzhen	6–1, 6–1
Huzhou	2025	(Japan) Yui Kamiji (China) Zhu Zhenzhen	(China) Wang Ziying (China) Li Xiaohui	1–6, 6–0, 10–8

==== Quads ====
Location	Year	Champion	Runner-up	Score
Camozzi Wheelchair Doubles Masters
Tremosine	2003	(Canada) Sarah Hunter (United Kingdom) Peter Norfolk	(United States) Rick Draney (United States) David Wagner	6–4, 6–1
Brescia	2004	(Canada) Sarah Hunter (United Kingdom) Peter Norfolk	(Italy) Giuseppe Polidori (Italy) Antonio Raffaele	6–1, 6–3, default
Bergamo	2005	(United States) Nick Taylor (United States) David Wagner	(Italy) Giuseppe Polidori (Italy) Antonio Raffaele	6–3, 6–7^{(5–7)}, 7–5
Bergamo	2006	(United States) Nick Taylor (United States) David Wagner	(Netherlands) Monique De Beer (Netherlands) Dorrie Timmermans-Van Hall	6–2, 6–2
Bergamo	2007	(United States) Nick Taylor (United States) David Wagner	(Sweden) Johan Andersson (Sweden) Christer Jansson	6–4, 7–6^{(9–7)}
Bergamo	2008	(Sweden) Johan Andersson (Netherlands) Bas van Erp	(United States) Nick Taylor (United States) David Wagner	6–3, 2–6, 3–6
Bergamo	2009	(United States) Nick Taylor (United States) David Wagner	(Israel) Shraga Weinberg (Netherlands) Dorrie Timmermans-Van Hall	6–1, 6–0
Bergamo	2010	(United Kingdom) Andrew Lapthorne (United Kingdom) Peter Norfolk	(United States) Nick Taylor (United States) David Wagner	4–6, 6–1, 6–3
Invacare Wheelchair Doubles Masters
Amsterdam	2011	(United States) Nick Taylor (United States) David Wagner	(Italy) Antonio Raffaele (Netherlands) Dorrie Timmermans-Van Hall	7–5, 6–4
Amsterdam	2012	(United States) Nick Taylor (United States) David Wagner	(Italy) Antonio Raffaele (Israel) Shraga Weinberg	6–1, 6–4
Mission Viejo	2013	(United States) Nick Taylor (United States) David Wagner	(United States) Greg Hasterok (Canada) Sarah Hunter	6–1, 6–3
Mission Viejo	2014	(United States) Nick Taylor (United States) David Wagner	(United Kingdom) Jamie Burdekin (United Kingdom) Andrew Lapthorne	6–4, 4–6, 6–3
Mission Viejo	2015	(United States) Nick Taylor (United States) David Wagner	(United Kingdom) Jamie Burdekin (United Kingdom) Andrew Lapthorne	6–4, 3–6, 6–3
UNIQLO Wheelchair Doubles Masters
Mission Viejo	2016	(United Kingdom) Antony Cotterill (United Kingdom) Andrew Lapthorne	(United States) Nick Taylor (United States) David Wagner	7–5, 1–6, 6–3
Bemmel	2017	(United States) Nick Taylor (United States) David Wagner	(United Kingdom) Antony Cotterill (United Kingdom) Andrew Lapthorne	6–4, 6–3
Bemmel	2018	(United States) Nick Taylor (United States) David Wagner	(United Kingdom) Antony Cotterill (United Kingdom) Andy Lapthorne	6–4, 7–6^{(8–6)}
Orlando	2019	(Australia) Heath Davidson (Netherlands) Niels Vink	(South Korea) Kim Kyu-seung (Japan) Koji Sugeno	4–6, 7–5, 6–2
Orlando	2020	no competition due to the COVID-19 pandemic		
Orlando	2021	(Netherlands) Sam Schröder (Netherlands) Niels Vink	(United States) Nick Taylor (United States) David Wagner	6–0, 6–1
Oss	2022	(Netherlands) Sam Schröder (Netherlands) Niels Vink	(Australia) Heath Davidson (Canada) Robert Shaw	6–1, 6–0
Barcelona	2023	(Netherlands) Sam Schröder (Netherlands) Niels Vink	(Australia) Heath Davidson (Canada) Robert Shaw	6–1, 6–1
Arhem	2024	(Netherlands) Sam Schröder (Netherlands) Niels Vink	(Turkey) Ahmet Kaplan (United Kingdom) Gregory Slade	6–3, 6–0
Barcelona	2025	(Israel) Guy Sasson (Netherlands) Niels Vink	(Australia) Heath Davidson (United Kingdom) Andy Lapthorne	6–2, 6–0
