= List of wheelchair tennis champions =

There are several lists of wheelchair tennis champions:

- List of men's wheelchair tennis champions
- List of women's wheelchair tennis champions
- List of quad wheelchair tennis champions

- Wheelchair tennis at the Summer Paralympics#Medalists
