= Wheelchair Tennis Tour =

Tennis tour for disabled men and women

- Current season, competition or edition: 2026 Wheelchair Tennis Tour
- Sport: Professional wheelchair tennis
- Founded: 1992
- Organising body: World Tennis
- Sponsor: Uniqlo
- Related competitions: ATP Tour, WTA Tour
- Website: www.itftennis.com/wheelchair

The Wheelchair Tennis Tour (currently sponsored as the Uniqlo Wheelchair Tennis Tour and abbreviated to the Uniqlo Tour) is a tennis tour for disabled men and women organized by World Tennis. There are three divisions: Men, Women, and Quad. The Quad division is a mixed-gender division, for players which have impairments in at least three limbs, and the competitors are allowed to use motorized wheelchairs. The tour was formed in 1992, comprising just 11 events. The tour now has over 150 events.

== Overview ==
The Wheelchair Tennis Tour is the world tour for wheelchair tennis. It is also the branch of the International Tennis Federation that is designed to protect the interests of the wheelchair tennis game. As of 2011, 173 tournaments are covered by the tour over many different categories. The tour's main goals are:

- Providing opportunities for thousands of people with physical disabilities to compete in events organised at the highest level of organisation and professionalism.
- Offering high intensity competition and excitement for men, women, junior and quad players from the recreational to the professional level.
- Increasing awareness for persons with disabilities throughout the world
- Giving wheelchair athletes rightful recognition as top sport athletes
- Creating opportunities for athletes to enjoy and compete in a sport for a lifetime with able-bodied and disabled people.

== History ==
Wheelchair tennis started in the 1970s through Jeff Minnenbraker and Brad Parks. First tournament took place in Los Angeles in 1977, which was won by Parks. In 1980 the National Foundation of Wheelchair Tennis (NFWT) was formed. A circuit of 10 tournaments within the USA was also established including the first US Open Wheelchair Tennis Championships. In 1981 The Wheelchair Tennis Players Association (WTPA) was formed.

The WTPA was formed to:
a) Foster competitive wheelchair tennis for the physically disabled throughout the world;
b) Establish and enforce rules which create fair and equitable play for all participants;
c) Organise a competitive network of tournaments sanctioned by the association; and
d) Formulate a uniform system throughout the world.

Also the WTPA with the NFWT formed the Grand Prix Circuit, linking four tournaments in major cities finishing with the US Open. The first tournaments outside of the USA began in France in 1982 as four tournaments were held. The first team competition the World Team Cup was established in 1985. The NEC Tour was formed in 1992.

In 1998, the WTPA was incorporated into the USTA.

== Uniqlo Tour ==
The Uniqlo Wheelchair Tennis Tour (formerly "NEC Tour") comprises several different categories of events. The most prestigious ones are the Grand Slams and the Wheelchair Tennis Masters. The next level of tournaments is Super Series. The other categories on the main tour are known as ITF 1, 2 and 3 (these were formerly known as the Championship Series) with futures for the developing players (formally known as satellite tour). In the Grand Slams, the prize money are determined by the organizers. For the rest of the ITF events, there are minimum amounts of (total) prize money set by the ITF.

Event category	Total prize money (USD)	Winner's ranking points	Governing body
Grand Slams	See individual articles	800	World Tennis
Masters Series	See individual articles	800	World Tennis
ITF Super Series	min. 45,000	650	World Tennis
ITF 1	min. 32,000	325	World Tennis
ITF 2	min. 22,000	220	World Tennis
ITF 3	min. 14,000	120	World Tennis
ITF Futures	min. 3,000	95	World Tennis

== See also ==
- List of Wheelchair Tennis Champions
- Wheelchair tennis at the Summer Paralympics
- BNP Paribas World Team Cup
