= Charlotte Famin =

French wheelchair tennis player

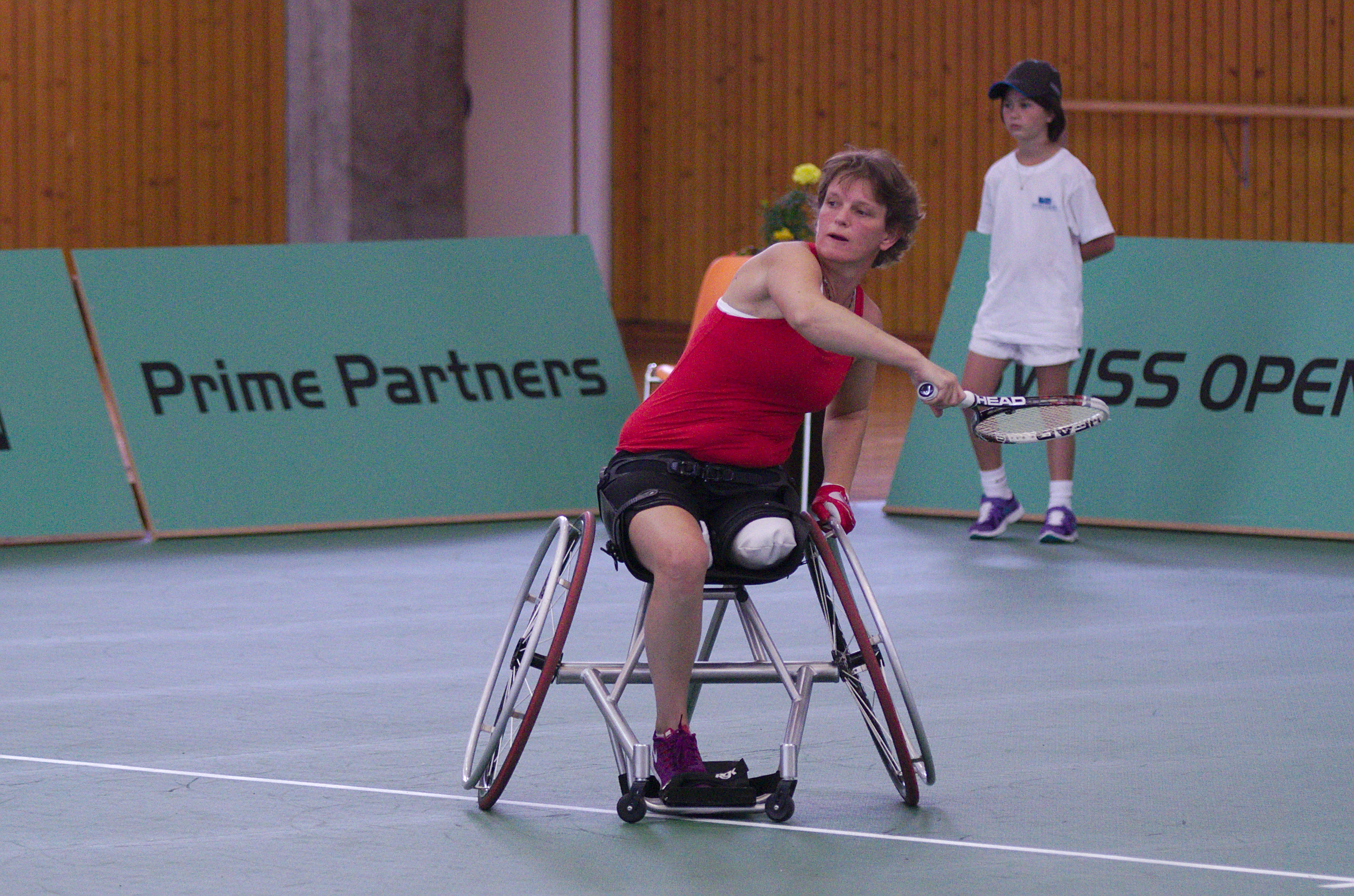
- Famin at 2014 Swiss Open
- Country (sports): France
- Residence: Puteaux, France
- Born: 12 February 1973 (age 53) Paris, France
- Turned pro: 2011
- Retired: 2021
- Plays: Right-handed (one-handed backhand)
- Coach: Claire Colson (16 October 1992)
- Prize money: 14 Millions dollars

Singles
- Career record: 7 times French Open winner
- Highest ranking: No. 9 (4 December 2017)
- Current ranking: Retired

Grand Slam singles results
- French Open: QF (2014, 2015, 2016, 2017, 2018, 2019, 2020)

Other tournaments
- Paralympic Games: 2R (2016)

Doubles
- Highest ranking: No. 7 (2 October 2017)
- Current ranking: Retired

Grand Slam doubles results
- French Open: SF (2014, 2015, 2016, 2017, 2018, 2019, 2020)

Other doubles tournaments
- Paralympic Games: 1R (2016)

Charlotte Famin (born 12 February 1973) is a French wheelchair tennis player who competes in international level events. She is a six-time French Open quarterfinalist and a 20-time French national wheelchair tennis champion.

Famin lost her left leg in a motorbike accident in 2008.
