= Louise Hunt (tennis) =

British wheelchair tennis player

Louise Hunt Skelley PLY
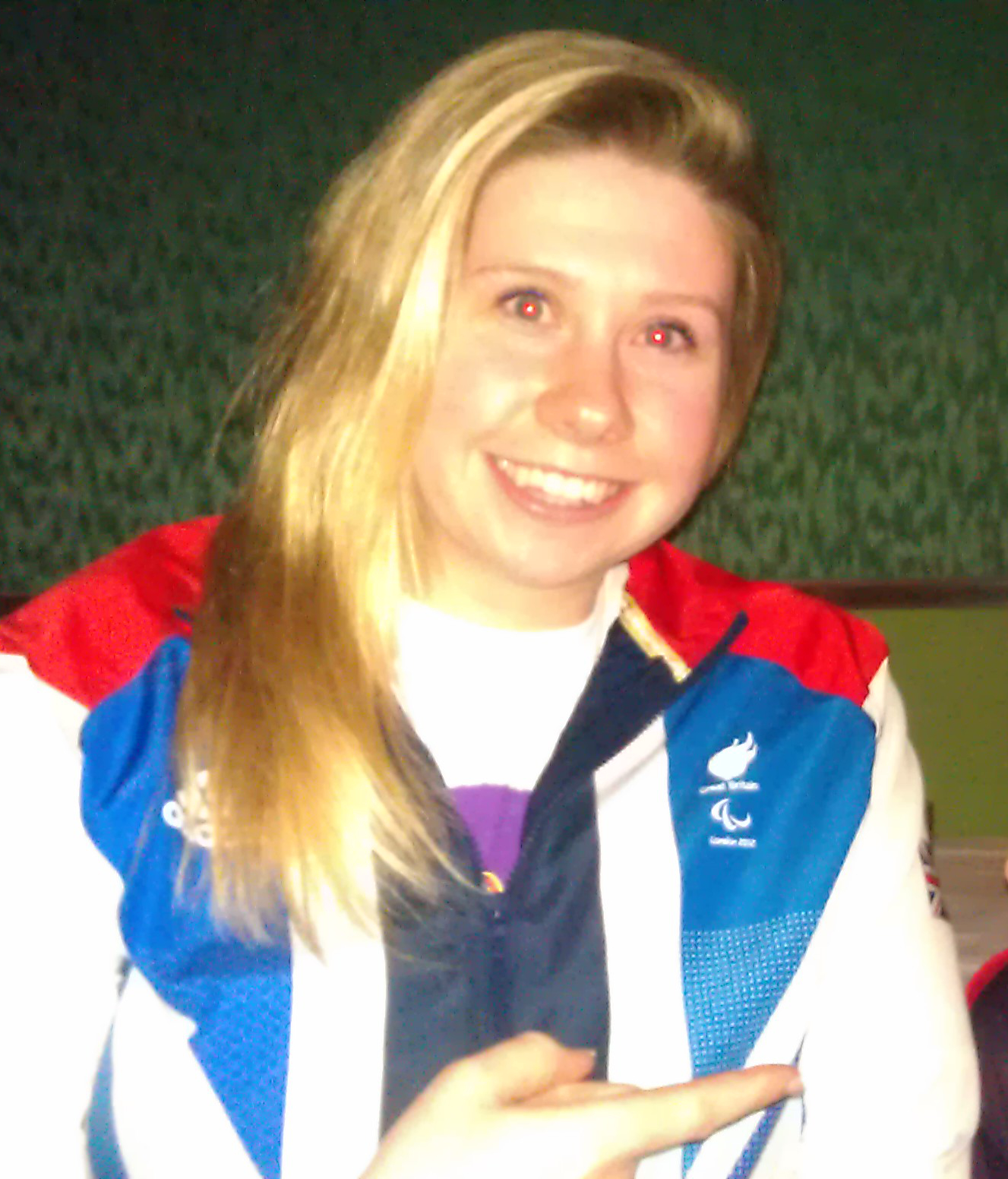
- Louise Hunt at the Games Makers party
- Country (sports): Great Britain
- Residence: Swindon, Wiltshire, England
- Born: 24 May 1991 (age 34) Wanborough, Wiltshire, England
- Turned pro: 2006
- Retired: 2021
- Plays: Right-handed (one-handed backhand)

Singles
- Career titles: 13
- Highest ranking: No. 10 (30 November 2015)

Grand Slam singles results
- Wimbledon: QF (2016)

Other tournaments
- Paralympic Games: 1R (2012, 2016)

Doubles
- Career titles: 41
- Highest ranking: No. 10 (16 January 2017)

Grand Slam doubles results
- Wimbledon: SF (2015, 2016)

Louise Hunt Skelley (born 24 May 1991) is a British wheelchair tennis player who competed internationally in both singles and double competitions. Former world number 2 in the junior wheelchair tennis singles rankings, and 10 in the women's international rankings.

She is a colour badge holder and has competed in two Paralympic Games (London 2012 and Rio 2016) and thirteen World Team Cups.

Louise is an athlete mentor, motivational speaker, international tournament director, and commentator. She has commentated at events such as Wimbledon, World Masters and Paralympics (2020, 2024).

Louise is married to Paralympic Champion, Chris Hunt Skelley.

== Tennis career ==
=== Early life ===
Louise Hunt Skelley started wheelchair tennis and handcycling at five years old. While competing in handcycling, Louise won seven out of ten London Mini Wheelchair Marathons, an un-official World Record.

Louise committed herself to wheelchair tennis. In 2007, Louise was named BBC West Sportsperson with an Impairment of the Year in Great Britain.

As a junior player, Louise won the girls doubles title three times at the Junior Wheelchair Tennis Masters in Tarbes, France.

In 2012, she studied BA (Hons) Sports Science and Performance at the University of Bath.

=== Professional tennis ===
In January 2009, Louise Hunt achieved No.2 in the Best Juniors Rankings. Louise won her first senior women's singles title in Turkey 2009 and added a second title later that year.

In 2010, Louise reached the ITF 2 Series final at the South Africa Open gaining a career singles ranking of No. 18.

She joined GB's women's team for the ITF World Team Cup. The team were runners-up in 2009, fourth in 2010, and bronze medal position in 2011 and 2012.

In 2011, Louise Hunt Skelley won four singles titles, including the athlete's first two titles at ITF 3 series status. In doubles, Hunt won eight titles.

By 2012, Hunt won back-to-back doubles titles in Australia, ending the season with seven doubles titles and two singles titles. Louise's ITF 2 Series women's singles title at the Israel Open qualified her for London 2012.

Louise Hunt Skelley attended the Paralympics in London 2012. She competed in the women's singles competition. Hunt lost out in the first round against top ten opposition, Yui Kamiji.

In 2013, Hunt Skelley won two doubles titles in Switzerland and Great Britain. She claimed the women's singles in Sheffield. At the Open International Fundacion Emilio Sanchez Vicario in Spain, Hunt Skelley competed in the women's singles final and won the women's doubles.

As a member of Team GB, Hunt Skelley won a silver medal in the women's event at the 2013 BNP Paribas World Team Cup in Turkey. By June 2013, Hunt competed in ITF 1 Series tournaments in Korea and took a place in the final of the women's doubles at the Korea Open in Seoul.

In July 2013, Louise Hunt Skelley was runner-up in the mixed doubles at the British Open Wheelchair Tennis Championships. In September, she won the women's doubles at the Open de L'Ile de Re in France. She won the women's singles and doubles at the ITF Futures tournament in Wrexham and finished runner-up in the women's doubles at the Nottingham Indoor in October.

Completing the 2013 international season, Hunt Skelley finished fifth in the Doubles Masters in California, partnering with Miho Nijo. After, she moved to a career best doubles high of No. 11. In December she won her fifth British women's doubles title.

In 2014, Louise Hunt Skelley competed in the women's singles and doubles finals at the North West Challenge and won the women's doubles and finished runner-up in the women's singles at the ITF 2 Desert Classic in Arizona.

In May 2014, she won the women's doubles at the Israel Open. She won the women's singles and women's doubles at the 6th Open Momorial Sant Silva (Spain) in June 2014. She was a member of Great Britain's silver medal-winning women's team at the BNP Paribas World Team Cup in the Netherlands.

In July 2014, she won the women's singles and doubles at the Rezidencija Open in Croatia. In August, she won back-to-back doubles titles at the Ath Open and Flanders 25 in Belgium.

In September 2014, Louise Hunt Skelley won the women's doubles at the PTR Championships. Hunt Skelley reached the final of the UNIQLO Wheelchair Doubles Masters, partnered with Katharina Kruger. Hunt Skelley ended the 2014 season, partnered with Kruger, winning the women's doubles at the Prague Cup Czech Indoor.

In May 2015, Hunt Skelley joined Great Britain's bronze medal-winning women's team at the BNP Paribas World Team Cup. Hunt Skelley beat world top 10 ranked opponent, Katharina Kruger. At the Czech Open, Hunt Skelley, partnered with Kruger, won the women's doubles. At the singles ranking of No. 13, Hunt Skelley made her Grand Slam debut, partnering with Kruger, in the women's doubles at Wimbledon.

Louise has won a number of silver and bronze medals as part of Great Britain's team at the World Team Cup. In 2016, she made her second successive appearance at Wimbledon. At the 2016 Korea Open, she competed in her first ITF 1 Series singles final.

Louise competed at the Paralympics in Rio 2016. She qualified at her highest world ranking: 10.

In 2019, the LTA (British tennis governing body) hosted international wheelchair tennis in Oxfordshire. Hunt Skelley, ranked British number three, beat Lauren Jones in the women's singles final, after dropping one game in the earlier rounds (6–4, 6–4).

Louise Hunt Skelley has won over 70 career singles and doubles titles during her international career. In 2012, Louise retired from competitive sport.

International Rankings in Women's Wheelchair Tennis (Singles)
Year	Year End Ranking
2020	29
2019	28
2018	21
2017	16
2016	13
2015	10
2014	17
2013	20
2012	23
2011	18
2010	22
2009	35

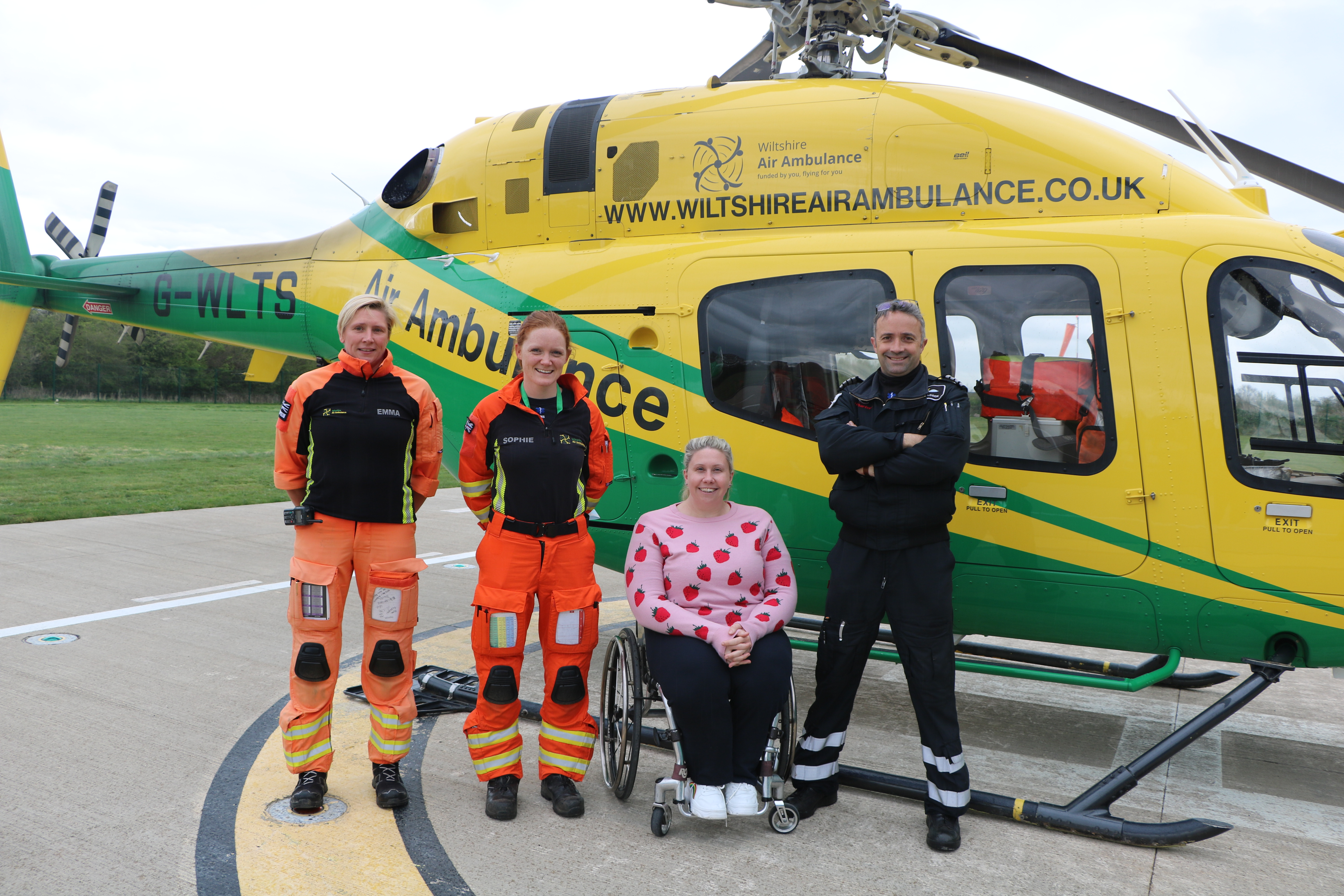
Louise Hunt Skelley and Wiltshire Air Ambulance crew and helicopter

== Personal life ==
Louise Hunt Skelley was born on 24 May 1991 with Spina Bifida. Spina Bifida is a developmental congenital disorder caused by the incomplete closing of the embryonic neural tube. Louise has been in a wheelchair her whole life as she has little movement in her lower limbs.

From 5, participated in swimming, basketball, and fencing. She favoured wheelchair tennis and wheelchair racing.

In 2016, Louise Hunt met Chris Skelley at the selection dinner for the Rio 2016 Paralympics. They married on 3 September 2022 at Holbrook Manor, near Wincanton in Somerset

In 2024, Louise published her memoir, 'What's Wrong With You?'.

=== Commentator, presenter, and mentor ===
"To be the best athlete I can possibly be and inspire the next generation."

Louise commentates on tennis across major competitions, notably covering Wimbledon and the Paralympics. Louise has appeared on The Last Leg and Paris 2024 Paralympics coverage. She is an athlete mentor for Youth Sport Trust and Tennis Foundation initiatives. She is an ambassador for Wiltshire and Bath Air Ambulance.

In 2019, Louise Hunt Skelley joined Swindon-based charity, PHOENIX, as employment engagement manager. "I hope my refusal to be defined by my disability will encourage my friends and colleagues to fulfil their own potential."

== Filmography ==
=== Television ===
Year	Title	Role	Notes
2018	Wimbledon - Men's Wheelchair Doubles Final	Analyst	Day 12 (14 July 2018)
2018	Wimbledon - Ladies' Wheelchair Doubles Final	Commentator	Day 13 (15 July 2018)
2020	Channel 4 - Paralympic Pairs	Herself/Guest	
2021	Channel 4 - Tokyo 2020 Paralympics	Commentator / Presenter for Wheelchair Tennis	
2021	The Last Leg of Tokyo	Herself/Guest	29 August 2021
2024	Channel 4 - Paris 2024 Paralympics	Commentator	For Wheelchair Tennis and Bronze Medal Final for Para Judo.
2024	Disability Sports Podcast	Herself	
2026	The Floor	Herself/Contestant	Eliminated Episode 3
