= Wheelchair tennis =

Tennis variation for people with disabilities

- Highest governing body: International Tennis Federation
- First played: 1976

Characteristics
- Mixed-sex: Yes

Presence
- World Championships: Yes (Team World Cup)
- Paralympic: Yes

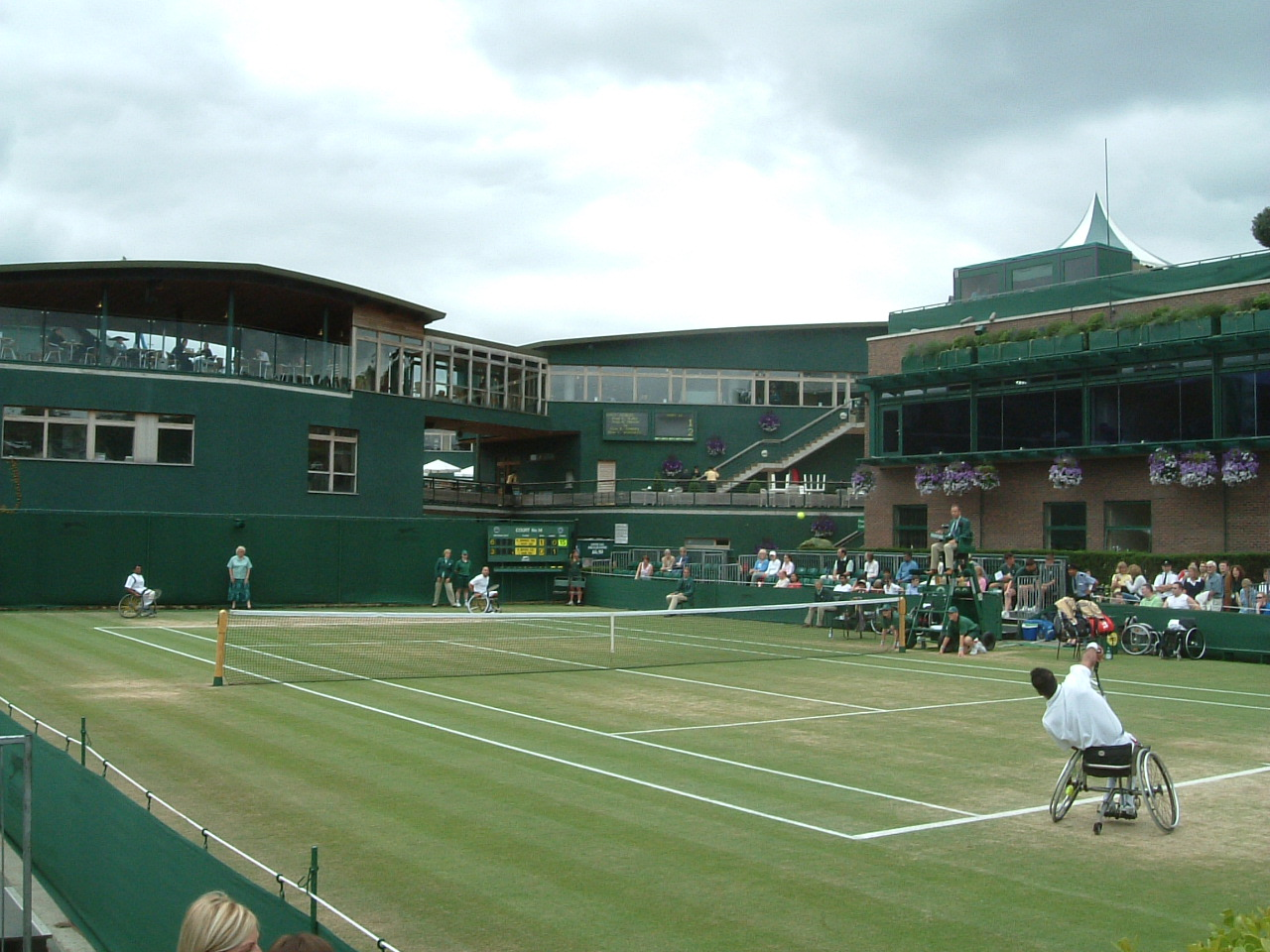
Wimbledon men's wheelchair doubles

Wheelchair tennis is one of the forms of tennis adapted for wheelchair users. The size of the court, net height and rackets are the same, but there are two major differences from pedestrian tennis: athletes use specially designed wheelchairs, and the ball may bounce up to two times, where the second bounce may also occur outside the court.

Wheelchair tennis has been played at all four Grand Slams since 2007 and is one of the sports played at the Summer Paralympics. There are three categories: Men, Women, and Quads; each category has singles and doubles tournaments. The Quad, the newest division, is for players who have substantial loss of function in at least one upper limb, but may include various disabilities besides quadriplegia. The division is sometimes called Mixed, especially at the Paralympic Games. Quad players often tape the rackets to their hand, to compensate for loss of function, and some players are allowed to use electric-powered wheelchairs.

== History ==
Wheelchair tennis increased in popularity in 1976 due to the efforts of Brad Parks, who is seen as the creator of competitive wheelchair tennis. In 1982, France became the first country in Europe to put a wheelchair tennis program in place. Since then, much effort has been made to promote the sport at the elite level.

The sport quickly became popular worldwide and was introduced to the Paralympic Games as a demonstration event at the Seoul 1988 Summer Paralympics. In 1990, wheelchair tennis was played alongside the able-bodied players' event in Miami. This continued for more than 15 years. It was at the 1992 Summer Paralympics in Barcelona that wheelchair tennis acquired the status of a full-fledged competition. The 2000 Summer Paralympics in Sydney boosted public appreciation immensely and led to the introduction of the sport to the four annual Grand Slams of Tennis. In 2004, after the efforts of Rick Draney, the Quad category was added to the Paralympic Games.

The wheelchair tennis class 8s at the 2002 Australian Open saw competitive wheelchair tennis take place at the same time and the same venue at a Grand Slam for the first time. In 2005 the Masters series was created, comprising all the events at the Grand Slams and the end of year championships, as Wimbledon and the US Open joined Melbourne. In 2007 Roland Garros joined and the Classic 8s were replaced by the Australian Open which had been held at the same venue two weeks later. In 2009 all events played at the able-bodied players' Grand Slams were renamed Grand Slams.

The Netherlands has dominated, with numerous victories at major tournaments including the Paralympic Games and the Grand Slams.

Esther Vergeer holds the record for winning four Paralympic gold medals – one each at the 2000, 2004, 2008 and 2012 Games. She holds the record for most consecutive wheelchair single matches won.

For the 2013 season, the ITF decided to adopt match tiebreakers in place of a third and deciding set in doubles matches. However the tiebreaker would only be used at events which were rated as ITF1 or lower and at the World Team Cup. The grand slams, however, were free to decide on the format of their tournaments.

== Major tournaments ==
=== ITF Wheelchair Tennis Tour ===
The ITF Wheelchair Tennis Tour consists of international tournaments with different grades and prize money. The wheelchair tennis tournaments are graded by the ITF. Total prize money for the tour in 2016 was over $2million. The wheelchair tennis tour includes the following types of tournaments:

- Grand Slams
- Masters
- ITF Super Series
- ITF 1 Series
- ITF 2 Series
- ITF 3 Series
- ITF Futures Series

The four Grand Slams – Australian Open, Wimbledon, Roland Garros, and US Open – include a wheelchair tennis draw. Until 2018, only the US Open and Australian Open offered a quad draw. Only four Quad players are invited (as opposed to eight for men and women). In 2018, a Quad Wheelchair Doubles Exhibition match was played at Wimbledon. Later that year, it was announced that Wimbledon would offer a quad draw in both singles and doubles, starting in 2019. On early February 2019, Roland Garros announced that on the same year, its competition would start including wheelchair quads draws.

The Super Series events include the Bendigo Open (Bendigo), Cajun Classic (Baton Rouge), British Open (Nottingham), Japan Open (Tokyo), US Open USTA Championships (St. Louis) and Open de France (Paris). The ITF publishes a year-long calendar with all tournaments and their respective grades.

=== World Team Cup ===
The ITF BNP Paribas World Team Cup is a wheelchair tennis tournament for national teams, held annually since 1985. The BNP Paribas World Team Cup World Group event is played once a year, for 4 category men, women, quads and boys juniors. There are four continental qualification events in Europe, Africa, Asia and Americas, in which men and women compete to qualify for the main event supported by the Cruyff Foundation.

40th: 2024: Men - United Kingdom/Spain/France/Netherlands Women - China/Netherlands/France/South Africa Quad - Chile/Turkey/Brazil/Australia Boys - United States/Australia/Brazil/Japan

Quad since 2004 and no events for girls and boys events added since 2005.

=== Wheelchair Tennis Masters ===
The last two major tournaments of the year are the Wheelchair Tennis Masters (singles event) and Uniqlo Wheelchair Doubles Masters. The top eight men, top eight women and top six quads based on ranking are invited to compete there each year.

=== Games ===
Wheelchair tennis is played at the Paralympic Games and FESPIC Games as well.

== See also ==
- ITF Wheelchair Tennis Tour
- Wheelchair Tennis Masters
- List of wheelchair tennis champions
- Wheelchair tennis at the Summer Paralympics
- Wheelchair tennis classification
- Adaptive Standing Tennis
- ITF BNP Paribas World Team Cup (Wheelchair Tennis)
- ITF Beach Tennis Tour
- Junior Davis Cup and Junior Billie Jean King Cup
