= Wheelchair tennis at the 2012 Summer Paralympics – Women's singles =

Wheelchair tennis – Women's singles at the XIV Paralympic Games
- Paralympic wheelchair tennis
- Venue: Eton Manor, London
- Dates: 1–7 September 2012

Medalists
1st place, gold medalist(s)		Esther Vergeer	Netherlands
2nd place, silver medalist(s)		Aniek van Koot	Netherlands
3rd place, bronze medalist(s)		Jiske Griffioen	Netherlands

Women's singles
- Wheelchair tennis at the 2012 Summer Paralympics

Events
Singles	men	women	quad
Doubles	men	women	quad
← 2008 ·	Summer Paralympics	· 2016 →

The women's singles wheelchair tennis competition at the 2012 Summer Paralympics in London was held from 1 September to 7 September.

== Calendar ==
September	1	2	3	4	5	6	7
Round	Round of 32	None	Round of 16	Quarterfinals	Semifinals	Bronze	Final

== Seeds ==
1. Esther Vergeer (NED) (gold medalist)
2. Aniek van Koot (NED) (silver medalist)
3. Jiske Griffioen (NED) (bronze medalist)
4. Sabine Ellerbrock (GER) (fourth place)
5. Marjolein Buis (NED) (quarterfinals)
6. Daniela Di Toro (AUS) (round of 16)
7. Annick Sevenans (BEL) (round of 16)
8. Lucy Shuker (GBR) (quarterfinals)

== Draw ==
=== Key ===
- INV = Bipartite invitation
- ITF = ITF place
- ALT = Alternative
- r = Retired
- w/o = Walkover

=== Finals ===
Semifinals
1	Esther Vergeer (NED)	6	6
3	Jiske Griffioen (NED)	0	3
4	Sabine Ellerbrock (GER)	5	2
2	Aniek van Koot (NED)	7	6

Final
1	Esther Vergeer (NED)	6	6
2	Aniek van Koot (NED)	0	3
Bronze medal match
3	Jiske Griffioen (NED)	6	7
4	Sabine Ellerbrock (GER)	2	6

==== Top half ====
Round of 32
1	E Vergeer (NED)	6	6
K Domori (JPN)	0	0
MA Ortiz (CHI)	5	5
K Krüger (GER)	7	7
J Whiley (GBR)	3	4
S Khanthasit (THA)	6	6
AB Villalobos (COL)	1	1
6	D Di Toro (AUS)	6	6
3	J Griffioen (NED)	6	6
N Mayara (BRA)	2	0
K Montjane (RSA)	7	6
LO Ribés (ESP)	5	2
MH Hwang (KOR)	2	6	5
E Kaiser (USA)	6	3	7
M Lauro (ITA)	2	1
8	L Shuker (GBR)	6	6

Round of 16
1	E Vergeer (NED)	6	6
K Krüger (GER)	0	0
S Khanthasit (THA)	1	6	6
6	D Di Toro (AUS)	6	0	3
3	J Griffioen (NED)	6	6
K Montjane (RSA)	2	2
E Kaiser (USA)	0	2
8	L Shuker (GBR)	6	6

Quarterfinals
1	E Vergeer (NED)	6	6
S Khanthasit (THA)	1	0
3	J Griffioen (NED)	6	6
8	L Shuker (GBR)	4	2

Semifinals
1	E Vergeer (NED)	6	6
3	J Griffioen (NED)	0	3

==== Bottom half ====
Round of 32
5	M Buis (NED)	6	6
R Techamaneewat (THA)	2	1
JM Vega (COL)	4	0
M Soldan (USA)	6	6
JY Park (KOR)	6	6
Y Okabe (JPN)	2	0
C Schoenn (FRA)	3	1
4	S Ellerbrock (GER)	6	6
7	A Sevenans (BEL)	6	6
H Koosz (AUT)	0	1
Y Kamiji (JPN)	6	6
L Hunt (GBR)	1	1
EJ Vélez (ESP)	3	1
F Mardones (CHI)	6	6
J Manns (AUS)	0	0
2	A van Koot (NED)	6	6

Round of 16
5	M Buis (NED)	6	6
M Soldan (USA)	2	0
JY Park (KOR)	1	4
4	S Ellerbrock (GER)	6	6
7	A Sevenans (BEL)	6	2
Y Kamiji (JPN)	7	6
F Mardones (CHI)	0	0
2	A van Koot (NED)	6	6

Quarterfinals
5	M Buis (NED)	6	5	2
4	S Ellerbrock (GER)	3	7	6
Y Kamiji (JPN)	6	5
2	A van Koot (NED)	7	7

Semifinals
4	S Ellerbrock (GER)	5	2
2	A van Koot (NED)	7	6
