= Wheelchair tennis at the 2012 Summer Paralympics – Women's doubles =

Wheelchair tennis – Women's doubles at the XIV Paralympic Games
- Paralympic wheelchair tennis
- Venue: Eton Manor, London
- Dates: 3–8 September 2012

Medalists
1st place, gold medalist(s)		Marjolein Buis; Esther Vergeer	Netherlands
2nd place, silver medalist(s)		Jiske Griffioen; Aniek van Koot	Netherlands
3rd place, bronze medalist(s)		Lucy Shuker; Jordanne Whiley	Great Britain

Women's doubles
- Wheelchair tennis at the 2012 Summer Paralympics

Events
Singles	men	women	quad
Doubles	men	women	quad
← 2008 ·	Summer Paralympics	· 2016 →

The women's singles wheelchair tennis competition at the 2012 Summer Paralympics in London was held from 3 September to 8 September.

== Calendar ==
September	3	4	5	6	7	8
Round	Round of 16	Quarterfinals	None	Semifinals	Bronze	Final

== Seeds ==
1. Marjolein Buis / Esther Vergeer (NED) (gold medalists)
2. Lucy Shuker / Jordanne Whiley (GBR) (bronze medalists)
3. Jiske Griffioen / Aniek van Koot (NED) (silver medalists)
4. Kanako Domori / Yui Kamiji (JPN) (quarterfinals)

== Draw ==
=== Key ===
- INV = Bipartite invitation
- ITF = ITF place
- ALT = Alternate
- r = Retired
- w/o = Walkover

=== Finals ===
Semifinals
1	Marjolein Buis (NED); Esther Vergeer (NED)	6	6
Sakhorn Khanthasit (THA); Ratana Techamaneewat (THA)	0	1
3	Lucy Shuker (GBR); Jordanne Whiley (GBR)	4	3
2	Jiske Griffioen (NED); Aniek van Koot (NED)	6	6

Final (gold-medal match)
1	Marjolein Buis (NED); Esther Vergeer (NED)	6	6
2	Jiske Griffioen (NED); Aniek van Koot (NED)	1	3
Bronze-medal match
Sakhorn Khanthasit (THA); Ratana Techamaneewat (THA)	7	6	3
3	Lucy Shuker (GBR); Jordanne Whiley (GBR)	6	7	6

==== Top half ====
First round
A Bernal (COL); J Martínez (COL)	6	6	7
F Mardones (CHI); MA Ortiz (CHI)	7	4	5
D Di Toro (AUS); J Manns (AUS)	4	0
S Khanthasit (THA); R Techamaneewat (THA)	6	6

Quarterfinals
1	M Buis (NED); E Vergeer (NED)	6	6
A Bernal (COL); J Martinez (COL)	0	1
4	K Domori (JPN); Y Kamiji (JPN)	6	6
S Khanthasit (THA); R Techamaneewat (THA)	7	7

Semifinals
1	M Buis (NED); E Vergeer (NED)	6	6
S Khanthasit (THA); R Techamaneewat (THA)	0	1

==== Bottom half ====
First round
E Kaiser (USA); M Soldan (USA)	7	2	5
S Ellerbrock (GER); K Krüger (GER)	5	6	7
E Jacinto Velez (ESP); L Ochoa Ribes (ESP)	1	5
MH Hwang (KOR); JY Park (KOR)	6	7

Quarterfinals
S Ellerbrock (GER); K Krüger (GER)	3	3
3	L Shuker (GBR); J Whiley (GBR)	6	6
MH Hwang (KOR); JY Park (KOR)	0	2
2	J Griffioen (NED); A van Koot (NED)	6	6

Semifinals
3	L Shuker (GBR); J Whiley (GBR)	4	3
2	J Griffioen (NED); A van Koot (NED)	6	6
