= Wheelchair tennis at the 2004 Summer Paralympics – Women's doubles =

Wheelchair tennis – Women's doubles at the XII Paralympic Games
- Paralympic wheelchair tennis
- Venue: Athens Olympic Tennis Centre
- Dates: 19–26 September 2004

Medalists
1st place, gold medalist(s)		Maaike Smit; Esther Vergeer	Netherlands
2nd place, silver medalist(s)		Sakhorn Khanthasit; Ratana Techamaneewat	Thailand
3rd place, bronze medalist(s)		Karin Suter-Erath; Sandra Kalt	Switzerland

Women's doubles
- Wheelchair tennis at the 2004 Summer Paralympics

Events
Singles	men	women	quad
Doubles	men	women	quad
← 2000 ·	Summer Paralympics	· 2008 →

The women's doubles wheelchair tennis competition at the 2004 Summer Paralympics in Athens was held from 19 September to 26 September at the Athens Olympic Tennis Centre.

== Draw ==
=== Key ===
- INV = Bipartite invitation
- IP = ITF place
- ALT = Alternate
- r = Retired
- w/o = Walkover

=== Finals ===
Semifinals
Maaike Smit (NED); Esther Vergeer (NED)	6	6
Chiyoko Ohmae (JPN); Mie Yaosa (JPN)	2	0
Karin Suter-Erath (SUI); Sandra Kalt (SUI)	5	0
Sakhorn Khanthasit (THA); Ratana Techamaneewat (THA)	7	6

Final (gold medal match)
Maaike Smit (NED); Esther Vergeer (NED)	6	6
Sakhorn Khanthasit (THA); Ratana Techamaneewat (THA)	0	4
Bronze medal match
Chiyoko Ohmae (JPN); Mie Yaosa (JPN)	5	3
Karin Suter-Erath (SUI); Sandra Kalt (SUI)	7	6

==== Top half ====
Round of 16			Quarterfinals			Semifinals
			Maaike Smit (NED); Esther Vergeer (NED)	6	6
Kimberly Blake (GBR); Janet McMorran (GBR)	3	2	Armelle Fabre (FRA); Florence Gravellier (FRA)	2	3
Armelle Fabre (FRA); Florence Gravellier (FRA)	6	6				Maaike Smit (NED); Esther Vergeer (NED)	6	6
Tiffiney Perry (NZL); Jacqueline Courtier (NZL)	2	2				Chiyoko Ohmae (JPN); Mie Yaosa (JPN)	2	0
Sharon Clark (USA); Kaitlyn Verfuerth (USA)	6	6	Sharon Clark (USA); Kaitlyn Verfuerth (USA)	5	3
			Chiyoko Ohmae (JPN); Mie Yaosa (JPN)	7	6

==== Bottom half ====
Round of 16
Karin Suter-Erath (SUI); Sandra Kalt (SUI)	6	6
Maria Dolores Ochoa (ESP); Barbara Vidal (ESP)	3	0
Young Suk Hong (KOR); Myung Hee Hwang (KOR)	6	6
Karin Korb (USA); Julia Dorsett (USA)	2	2
Yuka Chokyu (CAN); Hélène Simard (CAN)	1	1
Sakhorn Khanthasit (THA); Ratana Techamaneewat (THA)	6	6

Quarterfinals
Karin Suter-Erath (SUI); Sandra Kalt (SUI)	6	6
Young Suk Hong (KOR); Myung Hee Hwang (KOR)	3	2
Sakhorn Khanthasit (THA); Ratana Techamaneewat (THA)	6	6
Jiske Griffioen (NED); Sonja Peters (NED)	2	3

Semifinals
Karin Suter-Erath (SUI); Sandra Kalt (SUI)	5	0
Sakhorn Khanthasit (THA); Ratana Techamaneewat (THA)	7	6
