= Netherlands at the 2004 Summer Paralympics =

- Flag of the Netherlands
- IPC code: NED
- NPC: Nederlands Olympisch Comité * Nederlandse Sport Federatie
- Website: paralympisch.nl (in Dutch)

in Athens
- Competitors: 95 in 11 sports
- Medals Ranked 27th: Gold 5 Silver 12 Bronze 12 Total 29

Summer Paralympics appearances (overview)
- 1960; 1964; 1968; 1972; 1976; 1980; 1984; 1988; 1992; 1996; 2000; 2004; 2008; 2012; 2016; 2020; 2024

Netherlands competed at the 2004 Summer Paralympics in Athens, Greece. The team included 95 athletes, 53 men and 42 women. Competitors from Netherlands won 29 medals, including 5 gold, 12 silver and 12 bronze to finish 27th in the medal table.

== Medalists ==
Medal	Name	Sport	Event
Gold	Kenny van Weeghel	Athletics	Men's 400 m T54
Gold	Gerben Last; Tonnie Heijnen	Table tennis	Men's Teams 9
Gold	Robin Ammerlaan	Wheelchair tennis	Men's singles
Gold	Maaike Smit; Esther Vergeer	Wheelchair tennis	Women's doubles
Gold	Esther Vergeer	Wheelchair tennis	Women's singles
Silver	Kenny van Weeghel	Athletics	Men's 200 m T54
Silver	Willem Noorduin	Athletics	Men's Discus F36
Silver	Pieter Gruijters	Athletics	Men's Javelin F55-56
Silver	Pieter Gruijters	Athletics	Men's Pentathlon P54-58
Silver	Willem Noorduin	Athletics	Men's Shot Put F36
Silver	Jan Mulder; Pascal Schoots	Cycling	Men's Individual Pursuit Tandem B1-3
Silver	Joop Stokkel	Equestrian	Mixed Dressage – Championship grade II
Silver	Udo Hessels; Marcel van de Veen; Mischa Rossen	Sailing	Mixed Three Person Sonar
Silver	Kasper Engel	Swimming	Men's 100 m Breaststroke SB5
Silver	Marion Nijhof	Swimming	Women's 200 m Individual Medley SM11
Silver	Netherlands women's sitting volleyball team: Monique Bons; Karin Harmsen; Paula List; Maria Poiesz; Marijke Roest; Jolanda Slenter; Alberta Ten Thije; Els Verwer; Petra Westerhof; Anneke den Haan; Djoke van Marum	Volleyball	Women
Silver	Sonja Peters	Wheelchair tennis	Women's singles
Bronze	Kenny van Weeghel	Athletics	Men's 100 m T54
Bronze	Johan Reekers	Cycling	Men's Handcycle Road Race HC Div B/C
Bronze	Gert Bolmer	Equestrian	Mixed Dressage – Championship grade II
Bronze	Gert Bolmer; Joop Stokkel; Sjerstin Vermeulen	Equestrian	Mixed Dressage Team open
Bronze	Thierry Schmitter	Sailing	Mixed Single Person 2.4mr
Bronze	Mike van der Zanden	Swimming	Men's 100 m Freestyle S10
Bronze	Chantal Boonacker	Swimming	Women's 100 m Backstroke S8
Bronze	Marion Nijhof	Swimming	Women's 100 m Freestyle S11
Bronze	Marion Nijhof	Swimming	Women's 50 m Freestyle S11
Bronze	Pernille Thomsen	Swimming	Women's 50 m Freestyle S8
Bronze	Monique de Beer; Bas van Erp	Wheelchair tennis	Quad Doubles
Bronze	Bas van Erp	Wheelchair tennis	Quad Singles

Source: www.paralympic.org

== Sports ==
=== Athletics ===
==== Men's track ====
Athlete	Class	Event	Heats		Semifinal		Final	
Athlete	Class	Event	Result	Rank	Result	Rank	Result	Rank
Micha Janse	T37	800m	2:15.13	5 Q	N/A		2:15.41	5
Micha Janse	T37	1500m	N/A				4:38.83	5
Kenny van Weeghel	T54	100m	14.27	4 Q	14.30	1 Q	14.33	3rd place, bronze medalist(s)
Kenny van Weeghel	T54	200m	25.31	2 Q	N/A		25.32	2nd place, silver medalist(s)
Kenny van Weeghel	T54	400m	N/A					1st place, gold medalist(s)

==== Men's field ====
Athlete	Class	Event	Final		
Athlete	Class	Event	Result	Points	Rank
Jos van der Donk	F42	Javelin	46.83	-	4
Pieter Gruijters	F55-56	Javelin	37.79 WR	1180	2nd place, silver medalist(s)
Pieter Gruijters	F56	Shot put	9.78	-	11
Pieter Gruijters	P54-58	Pentathlon	5655		2nd place, silver medalist(s)
Henk Jansen	F57	Discus	41.20	-	5
Henk Jansen	F58	Javelin	34.51	-	8
Henk Jansen	F58	Shot put	11.80	-	9
Albert van der Mee	F12	Discus	37.51	-	8
Albert van der Mee	F12	Javelin	45.89	-	9
Albert van der Mee	F13	Shot put	12.58	-	10
Albert van der Mee	P13	Pentathlon	DNS		
Willem Noorduin	F36	Discus	33.33	-	2nd place, silver medalist(s)
Willem Noorduin	F36	Shot put	11.88	-	2nd place, silver medalist(s)

==== Women's field ====
Athlete	Class	Event	Final		
Athlete	Class	Event	Result	Points	Rank
Annette Roozen	F42	Long jump	3.33	-	5
Marije Smits	F42	Long jump	3.19	-	8

=== Cycling ===
==== Men's road ====
Athlete	Event	Time	Rank
Cefas Bouman	Men's handcycle road race HC div B/C	1:17:30	4
Cefas Bouman	Men's handcycle time trial HC div B/C	18:20.47	4
Johan Reekers	Men's handcycle road race HC div B/C	1:17:30	3rd place, bronze medalist(s)
Johan Reekers	Men's handcycle time trial HC div B/C	19:31.32	9
Jan Mulder; Bart Boom (pilot)	Men's road race/time trial tandem B1-3	-	7

==== Men's track ====
Athlete	Event	Qualification		1st round		Final	
Athlete	Event	Time	Rank	Time	Rank	Opposition Time	Rank
Jan Mulder; Pascal Schoots	Men's individual pursuit tandem B1-3	4:32.05	2 Q	González (ESP) / Suarez (ESP); W 4:27.98	2 Q	Modra (AUS) / Crowe (AUS); L OVL	2nd place, silver medalist(s)

=== Equestrian ===
==== Individual ====
Athlete	Event	Total	
Athlete	Event	Score	Rank
Gert Bolmer	Mixed individual championship test grade II	68.727	3rd place, bronze medalist(s)
Gert Bolmer	Mixed individual freestyle test grade II	73.389	5
Joop Stokkel	Mixed individual championship test grade II	70.545	2nd place, silver medalist(s)
Joop Stokkel	Mixed individual championship test grade II	74.333	4
Sjerstin Vermeulen	Mixed individual championship test grade IV	66.452	8
Sjerstin Vermeulen	Mixed individual championship test grade IV	73.091	5

==== Mixed team ====
Athlete	Event	Total	
Athlete	Event	Total	Rank
Gert Bolmer; Joop Stokkel; Sjerstin Vermeulen	Team	413.082	3rd place, bronze medalist(s)

=== Football 7-a-side ===
The men's football 7-a-side team didn't win any medals: they were 6th out of 8 teams.

==== Players ====
- Bart Adelaars
- Patrick Beekmans
- Nico Berlee
- Rudi van Breemen
- Richard van den Born
- Ruben de Haas
- Stephan Lokhoff
- Thiệu van Son
- David Tetelepta
- Martijn van de Ven
- Jeroen Voogd
- Milo de Wit

==== Tournament ====
Game	Match	Score	Rank
1	Netherlands vs. Brazil (BRA)	1 – 6	3
2	Netherlands vs. Russia (RUS)	1 – 7	3
3	Netherlands vs. United States (USA)	6 – 1	3
5th/6th classification	Netherlands vs. Iran (IRI)	0 – 3	6

=== Goalball ===
The women's goalball team didn't win any medals: they were 5th out of 8 teams.

==== Players ====
- Anneke Berkhout
- Marianna Huijben
- Christa Schrooten
- Nancy Sier
- Carla van der Weide Burgmeijer
- Jolanda van Wijk Knuman

==== Tournament ====
Game	Match	Score	Rank
1	Netherlands vs. Canada (CAN)	0 – 9	5
2	Netherlands vs. United States (USA)	0 – 2	5
3	Netherlands vs. Japan (JPN)	1 – 1	5
4	Netherlands vs. Finland (FIN)	1 – 8	5
5	Netherlands vs. Germany (GER)	4 – 0	5
6	Netherlands vs. Brazil (BRA)	3 – 1	5
7	Netherlands vs. Greece (GRE)	6 – 1	5

=== Swimming ===
==== Men ====
Athlete	Class	Event	Heats		Final	
Athlete	Class	Event	Result	Rank	Result	Rank
Kasper Engel	S6	100m backstroke	1:31.09	11	did not advance	
Kasper Engel	SB5	100m breaststroke	1:36.03	2 Q	1:35.98	2nd place, silver medalist(s)
Joost de Hoogh	S10	400m freestyle	4:28.82	3 Q	4:24.86	5
Joost de Hoogh	S10	100m backstroke	1:08.76	6 Q	1:08.41	7
Joost de Hoogh	SM10	200m individual medley	2:27.03	7 Q	2:23.70	5
Gert-Jan Schep	S8	50m freestyle	30.32	6 Q	30.14	5
Gert-Jan Schep	S8	100m freestyle	1:06.86	11	did not advance	
Gert-Jan Schep	S8	100m backstroke	1:17.64	6 Q	1:17.74	6
Gert-Jan Schep	SM8	200m individual medley	N/A		2:40.90	5
Mike van der Zanden	S10	50m freestyle	26.63	8 Q	26.49	7
Mike van der Zanden	S10	100m freestyle	57.14	5 Q	56.47	3rd place, bronze medalist(s)
Mike van der Zanden	S10	400m freestyle	4:29.47	5 Q	4:23.81	4
Mike van der Zanden	S10	100m butterfly	1:01.80	5 Q	1:01.48	5

==== Women ====
Athlete	Class	Event	Heats		Final	
Athlete	Class	Event	Result	Rank	Result	Rank
Chantal Boonacker	S8	50m freestyle	35.24	8 Q	35.21	8
Chantal Boonacker	S8	100m freestyle	1:15.15	7 Q	1:16.07	7
Chantal Boonacker	S8	400m freestyle	5:31.18	3 Q	5:31.51	4
Chantal Boonacker	S8	100m backstroke	1:23.89	2 Q	1:24.13	3rd place, bronze medalist(s)
Marion Nijhof	S11	50m freestyle	34.08	3 Q	33.58	3rd place, bronze medalist(s)
Marion Nijhof	S11	100m freestyle	1:13.61	1 Q	1:13.48	3rd place, bronze medalist(s)
Marion Nijhof	S11	100m backstroke	1:27.48	4 Q	1:26.17	5
Marion Nijhof	SM11	200m individual medley	N/A		3:10.32	2nd place, silver medalist(s)
Pernille Thomsen	S8	50m freestyle	32.98	3 Q	32.95	3rd place, bronze medalist(s)
Pernille Thomsen	S8	100m freestyle	1:13.37	4 Q	1:12.46	4
Pernille Thomsen	S8	100m backstroke	1:27.66	5 Q	1:27.92	5

=== Table tennis ===
==== Men ====
Athlete	Event	Preliminaries				Round of 16	Quarterfinals	Semifinals	Final / BM	
Athlete	Event	Opposition Result	Opposition Result	Opposition Result	Rank	Opposition Result	Opposition Result	Opposition Result	Opposition Result	Rank
Nico Blok	Men's singles 6	Kowalski (POL); L 0–3	Kusiak (NED); W 3–1	Abbadie (FRA); W 3–0	2 Q	N/A	Rosenmeier (DEN); L 2–3	did not advance		
Harold Kersten	Men's singles 6	Arnold (GER); L 0-3	Hassan (EGY); W 3-2	Politsis (GRE); W 3-1	3	did not advance				
Tonnie Heijnen	Men's singles 9	Zborai (HUN); L 0-3	Andree (SWE); W 3-1	N/A	2 Q	Bye	Fraczyk (AUT); L 1-3	did not advance		
Gerben Last	Men's singles 9	Cieslar (CZE); L 2-3	Alimardani (IRI); W 3-0	Gubica (CRO); W 3-0	2 Q	Leibovitz (USA); L 1-3	did not advance			

==== Women ====
Athlete	Event	Preliminaries				Quarterfinals	Semifinals	Final / BM	
Athlete	Event	Opposition Result	Opposition Result	Opposition Result	Rank	Opposition Result	Opposition Result	Opposition Result	Rank
Jolanda Paardekam	Women's singles 3	Mariage (FRA); L 0–3	Fukuzawa (JPN); L 0–3	Silva (CUB); W 3–1	3	did not advance			

==== Teams ====
Athlete	Event	Preliminaries				Semifinals	Final / BM	
Athlete	Event	Opposition Result	Opposition Result	Opposition Result	Rank	Opposition Result	Opposition Result	Rank
Nico Blok; Harold Kersten	Men's team 6-7	France (FRA); L 1–3	Denmark (DEN); L 2–3	Sweden (SWE); L 0–3	4	did not advance		
Tonnie Heijnen; Gerben Last	Men's team 9	Chinese Taipei (TPE); W 3-1	Croatia (CRO); W 3-2	Iran (IRI); W 3-1	1 Q	United States (USA); W 3-1	Austria (AUT); W 3-2	1st place, gold medalist(s)

=== Volleyball ===
The women's volleyball team won the silver medal after losing to China in the gold medal match.

==== Players ====
- Monique Bons
- Anneke den Haan
- Karin Harmsen
- Paula List
- Djoke van Marum
- Maria Poiesz
- Marijke Roest
- Aletta Adema Salagter
- Jolanda Slenter
- Alberta Ten Thije
- Els Verwer
- Petra Westerhof

==== Tournament ====
Game	Match	Score	Rank
1	Netherlands vs. China (CHN)	1 – 3	2 Q
2	Netherlands vs. United States (USA)	3 – 0	2 Q
3	Netherlands vs. Slovenia (SLO)	3 – 0	2 Q
4	Netherlands vs. Finland (FIN)	3 – 0	2 Q
5	Netherlands vs. Ukraine (UKR)	3 – 0	2 Q
Semifinals	Netherlands vs. United States (USA)	3 – 0	W
Gold medal final	Netherlands vs. China (CHN)	1 – 3	2nd place, silver medalist(s)

=== Wheelchair basketball ===
The men's basketball team didn't win any medals: they were defeated by Great Britain in the bronze medal game.

==== Players ====
- Peter Brandsen
- Frans van Breugel
- Mustafa Charif Jebari
- Ruud Dettmer
- Frank de Goede
- Koen Jansens
- Wimt Lam
- Gert Jan van der Linden
- Mario Oosterbosch
- Mete Oztegel
- Anton de Rooy
- Kornelis van der Werf

==== Men's tournament ====
Game	Match	Score	Rank
1	Netherlands vs. United States (USA)	82 – 66	1 Q
2	Netherlands vs. Germany (GER)	52 – 63	1 Q
3	Netherlands vs. Japan (JPN)	76 – 47	1 Q
4	Netherlands vs. Iran (IRI)	83 – 51	1 Q
5	Netherlands vs. Greece (GRE)	95 – 34	1 Q
Quarterfinals	Netherlands vs. Italy (ITA)	70 – 64	W
Semifinals	Netherlands vs. Canada (CAN)	70 – 91	L
Bronze medal final	Netherlands vs. Great Britain (GBR)	66 – 82	4

The women's basketball team didn't win any medals: they were 7th out of 8 teams.

==== Players ====
- Petra Garnier
- Asjousja Ibrahimi
- Jennette Jansen
- Evelyn van Leeuwen
- Cher Korver
- Jozima Mosely
- Roos Oosterbaan
- Fleur Pieterse
- Ingeborg Tiggelman
- Jeanine van Veggel
- Carina Versloot
- Miranda Wevers

==== Women's tournament ====
Game	Match	Score	Rank
1	Netherlands vs. Australia (AUS)	25 – 30	4
2	Netherlands vs. United States (USA)	38 – 57	4
3	Netherlands vs. Great Britain (GBR)	30 – 36	4
Quarterfinals	Netherlands vs. Canada (CAN)	46 – 65	L
Semifinals	Netherlands vs. Japan (JPN)	52 – 54	L
7th/8th classification	Netherlands vs. Great Britain (GBR)	48 – 30	7

=== Wheelchair tennis ===
==== Men ====
Athlete	Class	Event	Round of 64	Round of 32	Round of 16	Quarterfinals	Semifinals	Finals
Athlete	Class	Event	Opposition Result	Opposition Result	Opposition Result	Opposition Result	Opposition Result	Opposition Result
Robin Ammerlaan	Open	Men's singles	Larsson (SWE); W 6–0, 6–0	Weekes (AUS); W 6–0, 6–0	Majdi (FRA); W 6–0, 6–1	Saida (JPN); W 6–4, 3–6, 7–6	Welch (USA); W 7–5, 1–6, 6–4	Hall (AUS); W 6–2, 6–1 (gold)
Eric Stuurman	Open	Men's singles	Nakano (JPN); W 6–3, 6–1	Mira (ESP); W 6–2, 6–0	Kruszelnicki (POL); L 5–7, 6–0, 4–6	did not advance		
Robin Ammerlaan; Eric Stuurman	Open	Men's doubles	N/A		Lee (KOR) / Kwak (KOR); W 6–3, 6–1	Jaroszewski (POL) / Kruszelnicki (POL); W 6–2, 6–3	Jeremiasz (FRA) / Majdi (FRA); L 2–6, 2–6	Bonaccurso (AUS) / Hall (AUS); L 4–6, 7–6, 4–6

==== Women ====
Athlete	Class	Event	Round of 32	Round of 16	Quarterfinals	Semifinals	Finals
Athlete	Class	Event	Opposition Result	Opposition Result	Opposition Result	Opposition Result	Opposition Result
Jiske Griffioen	Open	Women's singles	Young (KOR); L 4–6, 6–4, 6–7	did not advance			
Sonja Peters	Open	Women's singles	Suter Erath (SUI); W 6–4, 6–4	Ohmae (JPN); W 6–3, 6–2	Siegers (GER); W 7–6, 6–3	Di Toro (AUS); W 7–5, 4–6, 6–3	Vergeer (NED); L 2–6, 0–6 (silver)
Maaike Smit	Open	Women's singles	Clark (USA); W 6–2, 6–3	Forshaw (GBR); L 4–6, 6–7	did not advance		
Esther Vergeer	Open	Women's singles	Blake (GBR); W 6–0, 6–1	Lu (TPE); W 6–0, 6–0	Khanthasit (THA); W 6–3, 6–1	Gravellier (FRA); W 6–3, 6–1	Peters (NED); W 6–2, 6–0 (gold)
Jiske Griffioen; Sonja Peters	Open	Women's doubles	N/A		Khanthasit (THA) / Techamaneewat (THA); L 2–6, 3–6	did not advance	
Maaike Smit; Esther Vergeer	Open	Women's doubles	N/A		Fabre (FRA) / Gravellier (FRA); W 6–2, 6–3	Ohmae (JPN) / Yaosa (JPN); W 6–2, 6–0	Khanthasit (THA) / Techamaneewat (THA); W 6–0, 6–4 (gold)

==== Quads ====
Athlete	Class	Event	Round of 16	Quarterfinals	Semifinals	Finals
Athlete	Class	Event	Opposition Result	Opposition Result	Opposition Result	Opposition Result
Monique de Beer	Open	Quads' singles	McPhate (CAN); W 6–1, 6–2	Taylor (USA); L 2–6, 2–6	did not advance	
Bas van Erp	Open	Quads' singles	Araya (CHI); W 6–1, 6–0	Eccleston (GBR); W 6–1, 3–6, 7–5	Norfolk (GBR); L 2–6, 3–6	Taylor (USA); W 6–4, 7–6 (bronze)
Monique de Beer; Bas van Erp	Open	Quads' doubles	N/A	Polidori (ITA) / Raffaele (ITA); W 6–3, 6–1	Eccleston (GBR) / Norfolk (GBR); L 6–2, 5–7, 1–6	Hunter (CAN) / McPhate (CAN); W 6–3, 6–1 (bronze)

== See also ==
- Netherlands at the Paralympics
- Netherlands at the 2004 Summer Olympics
