= Wheelchair tennis at the 2004 Summer Paralympics – Women's singles =

Wheelchair tennis – Women's singles at the XII Paralympic Games
- Paralympic wheelchair tennis
- Venue: Athens Olympic Tennis Centre
- Dates: 19–26 September 2004

Medalists
1st place, gold medalist(s)		Esther Vergeer	Netherlands
2nd place, silver medalist(s)		Sonja Peters	Netherlands
3rd place, bronze medalist(s)		Daniela Di Toro	Australia

Women's singles
- Wheelchair tennis at the 2004 Summer Paralympics

Events
Singles	men	women	quad
Doubles	men	women	quad
← 2000 ·	Summer Paralympics	· 2008 →

The women's singles wheelchair tennis competition at the 2004 Summer Paralympics in Athens was held from 19 September to 26 September at the Athens Olympic Tennis Centre.

== Draw ==
=== Key ===
- INV = Bipartite invitation
- IP = ITF place
- ALT = Alternate
- r = Retired
- w/o = Walkover

=== Finals ===
Semifinals
Esther Vergeer (NED)	6	6
Florence Gravellier (FRA)	3	1
Sonja Peters (NED)	7	4	6
Daniela Di Toro (AUS)	5	6	3

Final (gold medal match)
Esther Vergeer (NED)	6	6
Sonja Peters (NED)	2	0
Bronze medal match
Florence Gravellier (FRA)	6	2	2
Daniela Di Toro (AUS)	1	6	6

==== Top half ====
Round of 32
E Vergeer (NED)	6	6
K Blake (GBR)	0	1
PW Lu (TPE)	7	5	6
J Dorsett (USA)	6	7	3
T Perry (NZL)	1	0
F Dong (CHN)	6	6
H Simard (CAN)	3	4
S Khanthasit (THA)	6	6
F Gravellier (FRA)	6	6
M Yaosa (JPN)	1	2
A Bartczak (POL)	6	6
B Vidal (ESP)	0	0
S Kalt (SUI)	7	6
K Korb (USA)	6	2
YS Hong (KOR)	6	4	7
J Griffioen (NED)	4	6	6

Round of 16
E Vergeer (NED)	6	6
PW Lu (TPE)	0	0
F Dong (CHN)	0	1
S Khanthasit (THA)	6	6
F Gravellier (FRA)	6	6
A Bartczak (POL)	1	0
S Kalt (SUI)	6	6
YS Hong (KOR)	3	2

Quarterfinals
E Vergeer (NED)	6	6
S Khanthasit (THA)	3	1
F Gravellier (FRA)	6	6
S Kalt (SUI)	2	1

Semifinals
E Vergeer (NED)	6	6
F Gravellier (FRA)	3	1

==== Bottom half ====
Round of 32
B Siegers (GER)	6	6
J McMorran (GBR)	0	3
PW Lu (THA)	6	0
K Verfuerth (USA)	7	6
C Ohmae (JPN)	6	6
M Ochoa (ESP)	2	1
K Suter-Erath (SUI)	4	4
S Peters (NED)	6	6
M Smit (NED)	6	6
S Clark (USA)	2	3
MH Hwang (KOR)	2	0
K Forshaw (GBR)	6	6
J Courtier (NZL)	1	5
Y Chokyu (CAN)	6	7
A Fabre (FRA)	3	1
D Di Toro (AUS)	6	6

Round of 16
B Siegers (GER)	6	6
K Verfuerth (USA)	1	2
C Ohmae (JPN)	3	2
S Peters (NED)	6	6
M Smit (NED)	4	6
K Forshaw (GBR)	6	7
Y Chokyu (CAN)	1	3
D Di Toro (AUS)	6	6

Quarterfinals
B Siegers (GER)	6	3
S Peters (NED)	7	6
K Forshaw (GBR)	6	0
D Di Toro (AUS)	7	6

Semifinals
S Peters (NED)	7	4	6
D Di Toro (AUS)	5	6	3
