= Switzerland at the 2004 Summer Paralympics =

- IPC code: SUI
- NPC: Swiss Paralympic Committee
- Website: www.swissparalympic.ch

in Athens
- Competitors: 41 in 8 sports
- Medals Ranked 40th: Gold 2 Silver 6 Bronze 8 Total 16

Summer Paralympics appearances (overview)
- 1960; 1964; 1968; 1972; 1976; 1980; 1984; 1988; 1992; 1996; 2000; 2004; 2008; 2012; 2016; 2020; 2024

Switzerland competed at the 2004 Summer Paralympics in Athens, Greece. The team included 41 athletes, 27 men and 14 women. Competitors from Switzerland won 16 medals, including 2 gold, 6 silver and 8 bronze to finish 40th in the medal table.

== Medallists ==
Medal	Name	Sport	Event
Gold	Urs Kolly	Athletics	Men's long jump F44
Gold	Urs Kolly	Athletics	Men's pentathlon P44
Silver	Beat Bosch	Athletics	Men's 100m T52
Silver	Pia Schmid	Athletics	Women's 200m T52
Silver	Manuela Schar	Athletics	Women's 200m T54
Silver	Edith Hunkeler	Athletics	Women's 1500m T54
Silver	Edith Hunkeler	Athletics	Women's 5000m T54
Silver	Franz Weber	Cycling	Men's handcycle road race HC A
Bronze	Beat Bosch	Athletics	Men's 200m T52
Bronze	Marcel Hug	Athletics	Men's 800m T54
Bronze	Marcel Hug	Athletics	Men's 1500m T54
Bronze	Manuela Schar	Athletics	Women's 100m T54
Bronze	Franz Weber	Cycling	Men's handcycle time trial HC A
Bronze	Franz Nietlispach	Cycling	Men's handcycle time trial HC B/C
Bronze	Sara Tretola	Cycling	Women's bicycle time trial LC1-4 & CP 3/4
Bronze	Sandra Kalt; Karin Suter-Erath	Wheelchair tennis	Women's doubles

== Sports ==
=== Archery ===
==== Men ====
Athlete	Event	Ranking round		Round of 32	Round of 16	Quarterfinals	Semifinals	Finals	
Athlete	Event	Score	Seed	Opposition score	Opposition score	Opposition score	Opposition score	Opposition score	Rank
Robert Lehner	Men's individual W1	603	8	N/A	Antonios (FIN); L 155-160	did not advance			

=== Athletics ===
==== Men's track ====
Athlete	Class	Event	Heats		Semifinal		Final	
Athlete	Class	Event	Result	Rank	Result	Rank	Result	Rank
Beat Bosch	T52	100m	N/A				17.69	2nd place, silver medalist(s)
Beat Bosch	T52	200m	32.32	3 Q	N/A		32.35	3rd place, bronze medalist(s)
Heinz Frei	T53	800m	1:40.40	4 Q	N/A		1:40.11	6
Heinz Frei	T54	5000m	10:25.76	8 q	N/A		10:26.64	11
Heinz Frei	T54	10000m	21:10.07	7 q	N/A		20:53.95	7
Heinz Frei	T54	Marathon	N/A				1:32:04	7
Lukas Hendry	T11	400m	56.36	10	did not advance			
Marcel Hug	T54	800m	1:35.60	4 Q	N/A		1:32.66	3rd place, bronze medalist(s)
Marcel Hug	T54	1500m	3:08.08	20 Q	3:04.73	3 Q	3:05.48	3rd place, bronze medalist(s)
Marcel Hug	T54	5000m	10:29.93	14 Q	N/A		10:25.51	6
Edison Kasumaj	T53	100m	16.87	19	did not advance			
Tobias Loetscher	T54	800m	1:41.10	18	did not advance			
Tobias Loetscher	T54	1500m	3:04.54	9 q	3:08.64	12	did not advance	
Bojan Mitic	T53	100m	16.08	13	did not advance			
Bojan Mitic	T53	200m	27.57	10	did not advance			
Franz Nietlispach	T54	1500m	3:05.58	14 q	DNF		did not advance	
Franz Nietlispach	T54	10000m	21:48.46	16 Q	N/A		20:56.02	9
Franz Nietlispach	T54	Marathon	N/A				DNS	
Christoph Sommer	T46	1500m	did not advance				4:08.81	9
Christoph Sommer	T46	5000m	did not advance				15:24.99	6
Marcel Hug; Edison Kasumaj; Tobias Loetscher; Bojan Mitic	T53/54	4 × 100 m relay	54.75	6	did not advance			
Heinz Frei; Marcel Hug; Tobias Loetscher; Franz Nietlispach	T53/54	4 × 400 m relay	3:19.23	6	did not advance			

==== Men's field ====
Athlete	Class	Event	Final		
Athlete	Class	Event	Result	Points	Rank
Lukas Hendry	F11	Long jump	5.84	-	7
Urs Kolly	F44	Long jump	6.68 PR	-	1st place, gold medalist(s)
Urs Kolly	F44/46	Discus	41.66	833	6
Urs Kolly	F44/46	Javelin	46.87	871	7
Urs Kolly	F44/46	Shot put	12.65	870	9
Urs Kolly	P44	Pentathlon	4447 WR		1st place, gold medalist(s)

==== Women's track ====
Athlete	Class	Event	Heats		Semifinal		Final	
Athlete	Class	Event	Result	Rank	Result	Rank	Result	Rank
Simone Buess	T54	200m	34.07	14	did not advance			
Sandra Graf	T54	800m	1:56.11	12	did not advance			
Sandra Graf	T54	1500m	3:36.13	2 Q	N/A		3:30.30	10
Sandra Graf	T54	5000m	11:59.94	2 Q	N/A		12:10.50	6
Sandra Graf	T54	Marathon	N/A				1:59:09	5
Edith Hunkeler	T54	800m	1:53.61	5 q	N/A		1:52.13	4
Edith Hunkeler	T54	1500m	3:38.21	9 Q	N/A		3:28.48	2nd place, silver medalist(s)
Edith Hunkeler	T54	5000m	12:19.25	6 Q	N/A		11:59.69	2nd place, silver medalist(s)
Edith Hunkeler	T54	Marathon	N/A				1:56:21	4
Manuela Schaer	T54	100m	16.72	3 Q	N/A		16.93	3rd place, bronze medalist(s)
Manuela Schaer	T54	200m	30.11	2 Q	N/A		30.24	2nd place, silver medalist(s)
Pia Schmid	T52	200m	40.42	2 Q	N/A		41.04	2nd place, silver medalist(s)
Pia Schmid	T52	400m	1:23.15	3 Q	N/A		1:22.61	4

=== Cycling ===
==== Men's road ====
Athlete	Event	Time	Rank
Franz Nietlispach	Men's handcycle road race HC div B/C	1:24:51	5
Franz Nietlispach	Men's handcycle time trial HC div B/C	18:18.92	3rd place, bronze medalist(s)
Markus Rauber	Men's handcycle road race HC div B/C	OVL	10
Markus Rauber	Men's handcycle time trial HC div B/C	18:46.85	6
Ivan Renggli	Men's road race/time trial LC1	DNF	
Beat Schwarzenbach	Men's road race/time trial LC3	2:07:19	10
Franz Weber	Men's handcycle road race HC div A	1:05:49	2nd place, silver medalist(s)
Franz Weber	Men's handcycle time trial HC div A	12:10.70	3rd place, bronze medalist(s)
Raphael Ioset; Beat Howald (pilot)	Men's road race/time trial tandem B1-3	-	14

==== Men's track ====
Athlete	Event	Qualification		1st round		Final	
Athlete	Event	Time	Rank	Time	Rank	Opposition Time	Rank
Ivan Renggli	Men's 1km time trial LC1-4	N/A				1:13.28	16
Ivan Renggli	Men's individual pursuit LC1	5:11.36	5 Q	Vignati (ITA); W 5:05.87	4 q	Triboli (ITA); L 5:08.00	4
Beat Schwarzenbach	Men's 1km time trial LC1-4	N/A				DNS	
Beat Schwarzenbach	Men's individual pursuit LC3	4:19.66	9	did not advance			
Raphael Ioset; Beat Howald (pilot)	Men's 1km time trial tandem B1-3	N/A				1:07.60	9
Raphael Ioset; Beat Howald (pilot)	Men's individual pursuit tandem B1-3	4:46.13	12	did not advance			
Raphael Ioset; Beat Howald (pilot)	Men's sprint tandem B1-3	DNS		did not advance			

==== Women's road ====
Athlete	Event	Time	Rank
Sara Tretola	Women's time trial LC1-4/CP 3/4	28:00.04	3rd place, bronze medalist(s)

==== Women's track ====
Athlete	Event	Qualification		1st round		Final	
Athlete	Event	Time	Rank	Time	Rank	Opposition Time	Rank
Sara Tretola	Women's 1km time trial LC1-4/CP 3/4	N/A				1:25.50	11

=== Equestrian ===
Athlete	Event	Total	
Athlete	Event	Score	Rank
Claudia Straub	Mixed individual championship test grade IV	58.968	15
Claudia Straub	Mixed individual freestyle test grade IV	61.955	15

=== Shooting ===
==== Men ====
Athlete	Event	Qualification		Final		
Athlete	Event	Score	Rank	Score	Total	Rank
Juerg Kohler	Mixed 10m air rifle prone SH1	596	22	did not advance		
Otto Koller	Men's 10m air pistol SH1	549	26	did not advance		
Otto Koller	Mixed 50m pistol SH1	504	20	did not advance		
Patrik Plattner	Men's 10m air pistol SH1	550	23	did not advance		
Patrik Plattner	Mixed 50m pistol SH1	503	21	did not advance		
Hans Peter Steffen	Men's 50m rifle 3 positions SH1	1084	21	did not advance		
Hans Peter Steffen	Mixed 10m air rifle prone SH1	595	33	did not advance		
August Wyss	Men's 10m air rifle standing SH1	564	20	did not advance		
August Wyss	Men's 50m rifle 3 positions SH1	1128	8 Q	89.2	1217.2	8
August Wyss	Mixed 10m air rifle prone SH1	595	33	did not advance		
August Wyss	Mixed 50m rifle prone SH1	579	20	did not advance		

=== Swimming ===
==== Women ====
Athlete	Class	Event	Heats		Final	
Athlete	Class	Event	Result	Rank	Result	Rank
Chantal Cavin	S11	50m freestyle	35.15	6 Q	33.92	6
Chantal Cavin	S11	100m freestyle	1:15.17	2 Q	1:14.97	5
Chantal Cavin	SB11	100m breaststroke	1:42.38	5 Q	1:42.72	4
Christina Heer	S8	100m freestyle	1:22.01	14	did not advance	
Christina Heer	S8	400m freestyle	5:50.49	9	did not advance	
Christina Heer	S8	100m backstroke	1:39.16	11	did not advance	
Nathalie Suter	S7	50m freestyle	37.01	7 Q	37.18	8
Nathalie Suter	S7	100m freestyle	1:21.68	8 Q	1:21.42	8
Nathalie Suter	S7	100m backstroke	1:37.91	8 Q	1:35.73	8
Nathalie Suter	SB7	100m breaststroke	1:56.33	9	did not advance	
Tamara Vaucher	S7	50m freestyle	42.70	15	did not advance	
Tamara Vaucher	S7	400m freestyle	7:03.34	14	did not advance	
Tamara Vaucher	S7	50m butterfly	49.45	13	did not advance	

=== Table tennis ===
==== Men ====
Athlete	Event	Preliminaries				Quarterfinals	Semifinals	Final / BM	
Athlete	Event	Opposition Result	Opposition Result	Opposition Result	Rank	Opposition Result	Opposition Result	Opposition Result	Rank
Christian Sutter	Men's singles 4	Caci (ITA); W 3-2	Benedetti (FRA); L 2-3	Eid (EGY); W 3-1	2 Q	Choi (KOR); L 0-3	did not advance		
Rolf Zumkehr	Men's singles 1	Launonen (FIN); L 2–3	Kang (KOR); L 1–3	Maslup (ARG); W 3–1	3	did not advance			
Christian Sutter; Rolf Zumkehr	Men's teams 4	France (FRA); L 2-3	Germany (GER); L 0-3	Egypt (EGY); W 3-1	3	did not advance			

==== Women ====
Athlete	Event	Preliminaries				Quarterfinals	Semifinals	Final / BM	
Athlete	Event	Opposition Result	Opposition Result	Opposition Result	Rank	Opposition Result	Opposition Result	Opposition Result	Rank
Alice Rast	Women's singles 4	Pape (GER); W 3–2	Pillarova (SVK); L 2–3	Riese (RSA); W 3–1	2 Q	Dolinar (SLO); W 3–1	Weinmann (GER); L 0-3	Pape (GER); L 1-3	4

=== Wheelchair tennis ===
==== Men ====
Athlete	Class	Event	Round of 64	Round of 32	Round of 16	Quarterfinals	Semifinals	Finals
Athlete	Class	Event	Opposition Result	Opposition Result	Opposition Result	Opposition Result	Opposition Result	Opposition Result
Martin Erni	Open	Men's singles	Plowman (GBR); L 0–6, 6–2, 6-7	did not advance				
Daniel Pellegrina	Open	Men's singles	Gatelli (ITA); L 1–6, 7–5, 0-6	did not advance				
Martin Erni; Daniel Pellegrina	Open	Men's doubles	N/A	Quintero (USA) / Rydberg (USA); L 0–6, 3-6	did not advance			

==== Women ====
Athlete	Class	Event	Round of 32	Round of 16	Quarterfinals	Semifinals	Finals
Athlete	Class	Event	Opposition Result	Opposition Result	Opposition Result	Opposition Result	Opposition Result
Sandra Kalt	Open	Women's singles	Korb (USA); W 7–6, 6–2	Young (KOR); W 6–3, 6–2	Gravellier (FRA); L 2–6, 1-6	did not advance	
Karin Suter-Erath	Open	Women's singles	Smit (NED); L 2–6, 3-6	did not advance			
Sandra Kalt; Karin Suter-Erath	Open	Women's doubles	N/A	Ochoa (ESP) / Vidal (ESP); W 6–3, 6-0	Young (KOR) / Myung (KOR); W 6–3, 6-2	Khanthasit (THA) / Techamaneewat (THA); L 5–7, 0-6	Ohmae (JPN) / Yaosa (JPN); W 7–5, 6-3 (bronze)

== See also ==
- Switzerland at the Paralympics
- Switzerland at the 2004 Summer Olympics
