= Wheelchair tennis at the 2004 Summer Paralympics =

- Date: 19–26 September 2004
- Edition: 4th
- Location: Athens Olympic Tennis Centre

Champions

Men's singles
- (Netherlands) Robin Ammerlaan

Women's singles
- (Netherlands) Esther Vergeer

Men's doubles
- (Japan) Shingo Kunieda / Satoshi Saida

Women's doubles
- (Netherlands) Maaike Smit / Esther Vergeer

Quad singles
- (United Kingdom) Peter Norfolk

Quad doubles
- (United States) Nick Taylor / David Wagner
← 2000 ·	Summer Paralympics	· 2008 →

Wheelchair Tennis at the 2004 Summer Paralympics was staged at the Olympic Tennis Centre from September 19 to September 26.

There were singles and doubles competitions for men, women and quads. All matches were played to the best of three sets.

== Participating countries ==
- Argentina (1)
- Australia (4)
- Austria (4)
- Brazil (2)
- Canada (4)
- Chile (2)
- China (2)
- Chinese Taipei (2)
- Czech Republic (1)
- France (6)
- Germany (2)
- Great Britain (10)
- Greece (1)
- Hungary (2)
- Indonesia (2)
- Israel (1)
- Italy (4)
- Japan (8)
- Malaysia (1)
- Netherlands (8)
- New Zealand (3)
- Poland (5)
- Russia (1)
- Slovakia (2)
- South Africa (2)
- South Korea (4)
- Spain (4)
- Sri Lanka (2)
- Sweden (3)
- Switzerland (4)
- Thailand (4)
- United States (11)

== Medal table ==
Rank	Nation	Gold	Silver	Bronze	Total
1	Netherlands (NED)	3	1	2	6
2	Great Britain (GBR)	1	1	0	2
2	United States (USA)	1	1	0	2
4	Japan (JPN)	1	0	0	1
5	Australia (AUS)	0	1	2	3
6	France (FRA)	0	1	1	2
7	Thailand (THA)	0	1	0	1
8	Switzerland (SUI)	0	0	1	1
Totals (8 entries)		6	6	6	18

== Medal summary ==
Event	Gold	Silver	Bronze
Men's singles	Robin Ammerlaan; Netherlands	David Hall; Australia	Michaël Jérémiasz; France
Men's doubles	Japan (JPN); Shingo Kunieda; Satoshi Saida	France (FRA); Michaël Jérémiasz; Lahcen Majdi	Australia (AUS); Anthony Bonaccurso; David Hall
Women's singles	Esther Vergeer; Netherlands	Sonja Peters; Netherlands	Daniela Di Toro; Australia
Women's doubles	Netherlands (NED); Maaike Smit; Esther Vergeer	Thailand (THA); Sakhorn Khanthasit; Ratana Techamaneewat	Switzerland (SUI); Sandra Kalt; Karin Suter Erath
Quad singles	Peter Norfolk; Great Britain	David Wagner; United States	Bas van Erp; Netherlands
Quad doubles	United States (USA); Nick Taylor; David Wagner	Great Britain (GBR); Mark Eccleston; Peter Norfolk	Netherlands (NED); Monique de Beer; Bas van Erp

Source: Paralympic.org

== See also ==
- Tennis at the 2004 Summer Olympics
