= Wheelchair tennis at the 2012 Summer Paralympics =

- Date: 1–8 September 2012
- Edition: 7th
- Category: Super Series
- Location: Eton Manor, London

Champions

Men's singles
- Shingo Kunieda (JPN)

Women's singles
- Esther Vergeer (NED)

Men's doubles
- Stefan Olsson (SWE) / Peter Vikström (SWE)

Women's doubles
- Esther Vergeer (NED) / Marjolein Buis (NED)

Quad singles
- Noam Gershony (ISR)

Quad doubles
- Nick Taylor (USA) / David Wagner (USA)
- Summer Paralympics

Wheelchair tennis events at the 2012 Summer Paralympics were held between 1 and 9 September at Eton Manor, London.

== Classification ==
Players were classified according to the type and extent of their disability. The classification system allowed players to compete against others with a similar level of function. To compete in wheelchair tennis, athletes must have a major or total loss of function in one or both legs. Quadriplegic class players compete in mixed events, while Paraplegic class players (with full use of their arms) competed in separate men's and women's events.

== Events ==
Six events were contested:

- Men's singles
- Men's doubles
- Women's singles
- Women's doubles
- Quad singles
- Quad doubles

(Quadriplegic class players are not divided by gender)

== Participating nations ==
112 competitors from 31 nations took part in this sport.

- Argentina (2)
- Australia (4)
- Austria (3)
- Belgium (3)
- Brazil (5)
- Canada (2)
- Chile (4)
- Colombia (3)
- France (5)
- Germany (2)
- Great Britain (10)
- Hungary (1)
- Iran (1)
- Iraq (1)
- Israel (3)
- Italy (4)
- Japan (9)
- Morocco (1)
- Netherlands (8)
- Nigeria (2)
- Poland (4)
- Slovakia (1)
- South Africa (4)
- South Korea (4)
- Spain (4)
- Sri Lanka (2)
- Sweden (4)
- Switzerland (2)
- Thailand (4)
- United States (9)
- Zimbabwe (1)

== Medal summary ==
=== Medalists ===
Event	Gold	Silver	Bronze
Men's singles	Shingo Kunieda; Japan	Stéphane Houdet; France	Ronald Vink; Netherlands
Men's doubles	Sweden (SWE); Stefan Olsson; Peter Vikström	France (FRA); Frédéric Cattanéo; Nicolas Peifer	France (FRA); Stéphane Houdet; Michaël Jérémiasz
Women's singles	Esther Vergeer; Netherlands	Aniek van Koot; Netherlands	Jiske Griffioen; Netherlands
Women's doubles	Netherlands (NED); Marjolein Buis; Esther Vergeer	Netherlands (NED); Jiske Griffioen; Aniek van Koot	Great Britain (GBR); Lucy Shuker; Jordanne Whiley
Quad singles	Noam Gershony; Israel	David Wagner; United States	Nicholas Taylor; United States
Quad doubles	United States (USA); Nicholas Taylor; David Wagner	Great Britain (GBR); Andrew Lapthorne; Peter Norfolk	Israel (ISR); Noam Gershony; Shraga Weinberg

Source: Paralympic.org

=== Medal table ===
Rank	Nation	Gold	Silver	Bronze	Total
1	Netherlands (NED)	2	2	2	6
2	United States (USA)	1	1	1	3
3	Israel (ISR)	1	0	1	2
4	Japan (JPN)	1	0	0	1
4	Sweden (SWE)	1	0	0	1
6	France (FRA)	0	2	1	3
7	Great Britain (GBR)	0	1	1	2
Totals (7 entries)		6	6	6	18
