= Aniek van Koot =

Dutch wheelchair tennis player

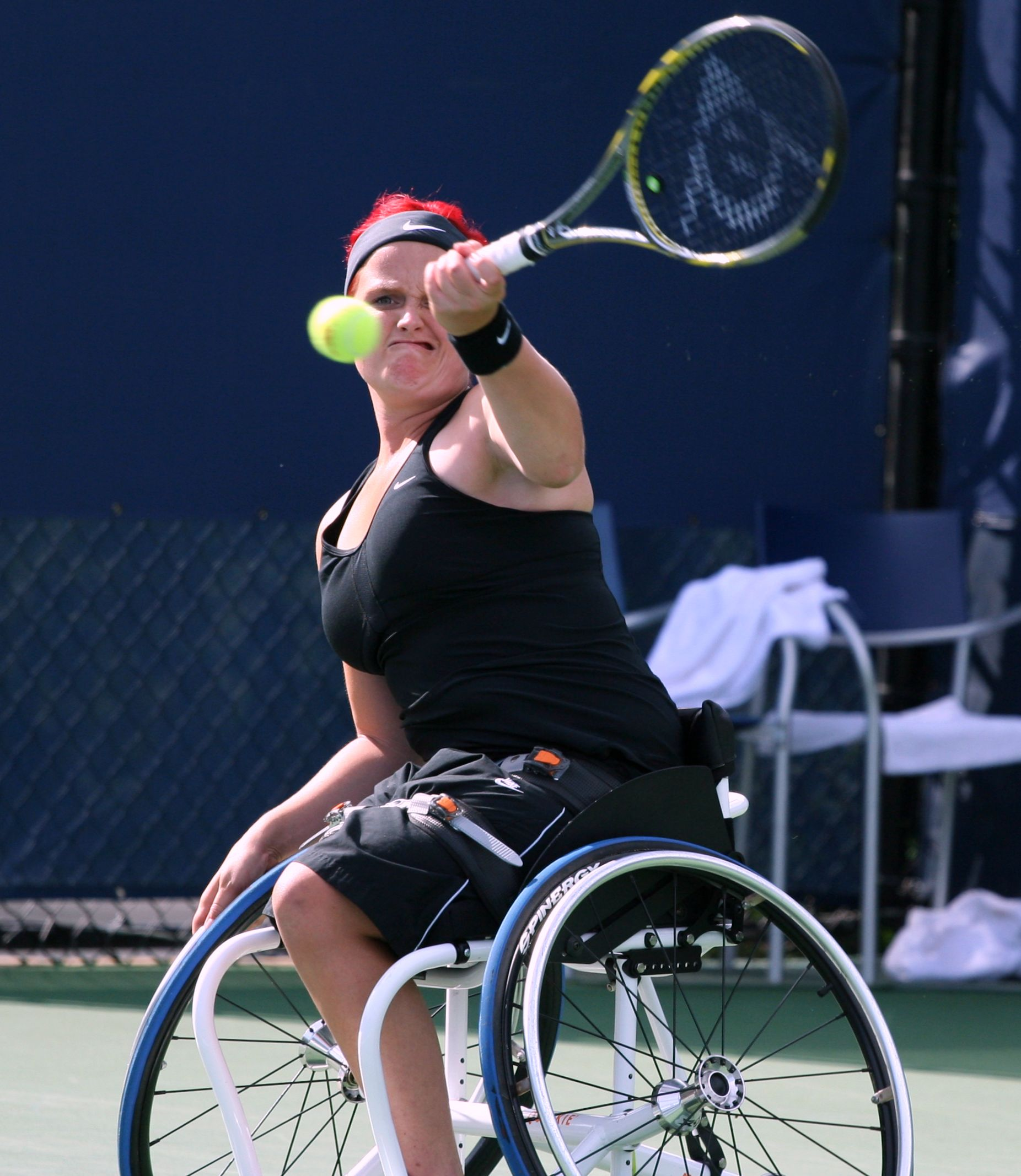
- Aniek van Koot in 2011
- Country (sports): Netherlands
- Born: 15 August 1990 (age 35) Winterswijk, Netherlands

Singles
- Career record: 374–144
- Highest ranking: No. 1 (28 January 2013)
- Current ranking: No. 6 (19 June 2023)

Grand Slam singles results
- Australian Open: W (2013)
- French Open: F (2012, 2014, 2015, 2025)
- Wimbledon: W (2019)
- US Open: W (2013)

Other tournaments
- Masters: W (2014)
- Paralympic Games: Silver Medal (2) (2012, 2016)

Doubles
- Career record: 290–98
- Highest ranking: No. 1 (26 July 2010)
- Current ranking: No. 3 (19 June 2023)

Grand Slam doubles results
- Australian Open: W (2010, 2013, 2017, 2019, 2021, 2022, 2023)
- French Open: W (2010, 2013, 2015, 2018, 2019, 2020, 2021, 2022, 2024)
- Wimbledon: W (2012, 2013, 2019)
- US Open: W (2013, 2015, 2019, 2021, 2022)

Other doubles tournaments
- Masters Doubles: W (2010, 2012, 2015, 2018, 2019, 2021, 2022)
- Paralympic Games: Gold Medal (2016, 2020); Silver Medal (2012)
Medal record
Women's wheelchair tennis
Representing Netherlands
Paralympic Games
Gold medal – first place	2016 Rio de Janeiro	Women's doubles
Gold medal – first place	2020 Tokyo	Women's doubles
Silver medal – second place	2012 London	Women's singles
Silver medal – second place	2012 London	Women's doubles
Silver medal – second place	2016 Rio de Janeiro	Women's singles
European Championships
Silver medal – second place	2023 Rotterdam	Women's singles
- Last updated on: 10 June 2021.

Aniek van Koot (born 15 August 1990) is a Dutch wheelchair tennis player who is a former world No. 1 in both singles and doubles.

Van Koot has won 26 major titles, having won the 2013 Australian Open, 2013 US Open and 2019 Wimbledon Championships in wheelchair singles combined with 23 major titles in doubles, variously partnering Florence Gravellier, Daniela di Toro, Jiske Griffioen and Diede de Groot. Van Koot has completed the calendar year Grand Slam in doubles on two occasions, in 2013 with Griffioen, and in 2019 alongside de Groot. She won the Wheelchair Tennis Masters in 2014 in singles, and in 2012, 2015 and 2018 in doubles. Van Koot has also won five Paralympic medals, gold in doubles at both Rio 2016 and Tokyo 2020, silver in singles at London 2012 and Rio 2016, and silver in doubles at London 2012.

== Personal life ==
Aniek van Koot was born with her right leg shorter than her left. After a series of unsuccessful corrective operations van Koot had her right leg amputated. She started to play wheelchair tennis at the age of 10.

== Career ==
In singles play van Koot was successful in Montreal. During the 2006 season van Koot won doubles titles in Livorno with Korie Homan, Jesolo with Sevenans. She finished third with Walraven at the 2006 Masters.

Van Koot won junior titles in Sydney and Nottingham during the 2007 season. She was also part of the Netherlands team that reached the Junior World Team cup final. In senior competition van Koot won a title in Gross Siegharts. Van Koot also made the finals of Hilton Head, Atlanta and Sardina. In doubles competitions she won in Jambes with Esther Vergeer. Won Austrian Open with Makke Smit. Sardinia. Van Koot reached the final of the French Open with Yaosa. With Yaosa finished last at the Masters. Finalist with Florence Gravellier at Pensacola and Nottingham.

During the 2008 season van Koot won one title in Prague. Van Koot reached the final of the singles competitions in Nottingham, Hilton Head, Jambes and Gross Siegharts. At the end of year Masters van Koot failed to advance from her group. In doubles competitions van Koot won titles in Christchurch and Sardinia with Jiske Griffioen. With Smit, van Koot added the Austrian Open doubles title before claiming the mixed doubles crown with Stefan Olsson.

=== 2009–2012 ===
During the 2009 season van Koot was a finalist in Boca Raton and Roland Garros. Van Koot won titles in Pensacola, Olot, Jambes and Prague. Van Koot finished 6th in the Masters. In doubles competitions van Koot won in Olot and Jambes. Playing with Jiske Griffioen at the Masters the pair reached the final.

The 2011 season saw van Koot win singles titles in Adelaide, Paris, Geneva, Jambes and Salzburg. reach the final in Boca Raton, Seoul and of the Masters. At the Grand Slams van Koot finished as the runner up in New York. Partnering Griffioen in the doubles events the pair won titles in Sydney, Pensacola, Boca Raton, Paris, Nottingham and St. Louis. The pair lost in the final of all four Grand Slams to Vergeer and Walraven, including from 5–2 up in the final set at Wimbledon and a 6–1 second set tiebreak lead at the US Open. Additionally the pair also lost in the final of the Japan Open and the Masters. Van Koot played doubles with other players as well, having success with Annick Sevenans in Geneva, Jambes and Salzburg. While with Marjolein Buis she won in Seoul. With Jordanne Whiley van Koot made the final of Sardinia.

During the 2012 season van Koot picked up singles titles in Cajan, Seoul and Paris. She was also the runner up in Sydney, Pensacola, Nottingham and the season ending Masters. Van Koot additionally picked up the silver medal at the Paralympic Games and was a finalist at Roland Garros and Melbourne. In doubles play van Koot played with Griffioen; the pair won titles in Cajan, Pensacola, Paris and Nottingham. They were also finalist in Boca Raton and Fukuoka. The pair also won their first Grand Slam as a team at Wimbledon and claimed the silver medal at the Paralympics. To finish the year the pair claimed their first Masters doubles title as a team. At the start of the year van Koot teamed up with Buis winning the title in Sydney and reaching the final of the first slam event of the year. Van Koot also represented her country in the World Team Cup, where she guided her country to win the competition for the 25 time.

=== 2013–present ===
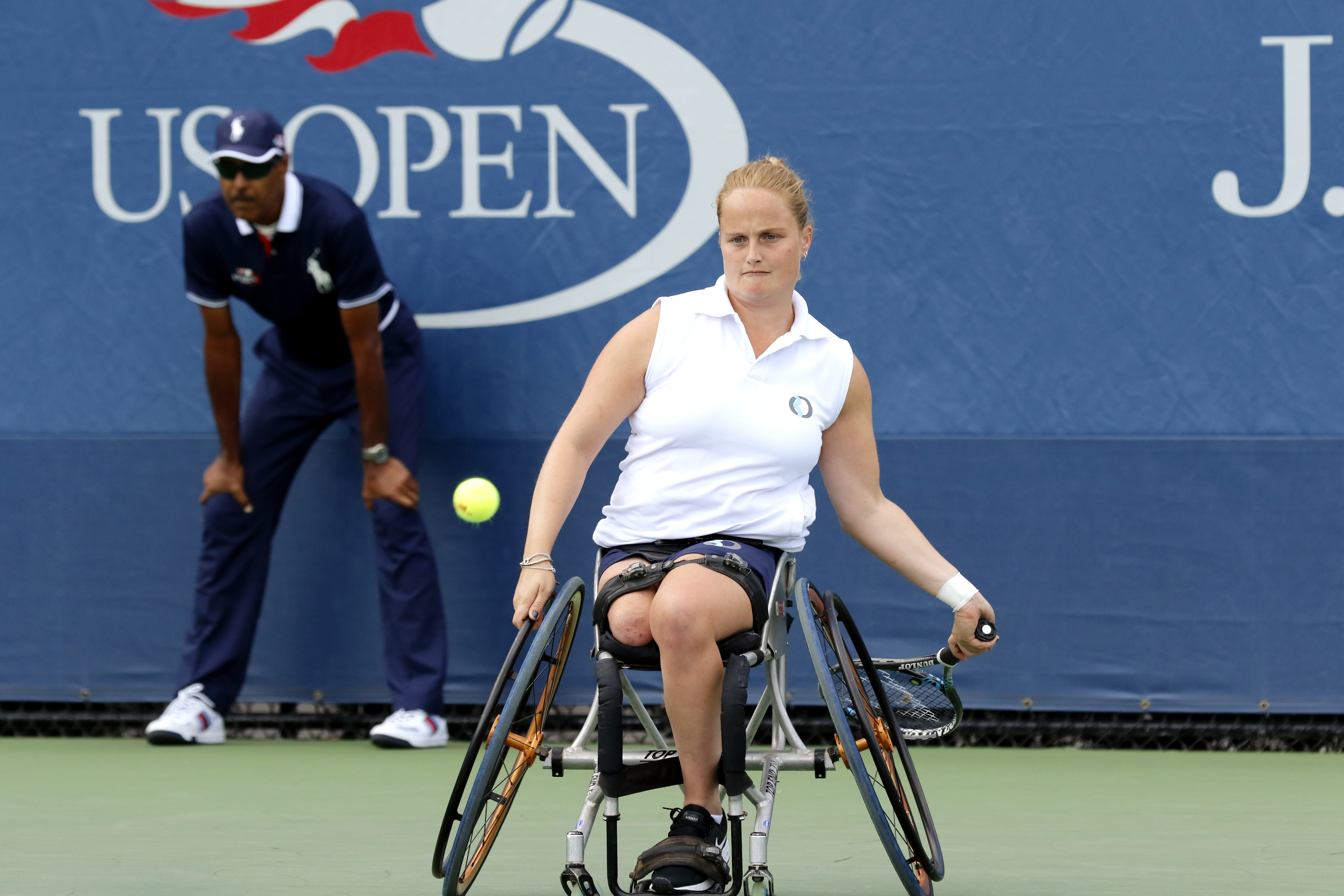
Aniek van Koot at the 2017 US Open

During the 2013 season van Koot won titles in Baton Rouge, Olot, and Jambes. Van Koot has made finals in Sydney, Melbourne, Nottingham and St Louis. At the Australian Open van Koot claimed her first Grand Slam singles title. Van Koot competed in the other Grand Slam events losing in the semi-final of Roland Garros but winning the US Open. As a result of her success at the Australian Open and Esther Vergeer not playing, van Koot ascended to the world number one spot in the rankings. Van Koot lost the world number one spot to Sabine Ellerbrock in June after the French Open, but regained it following her success at the US Open. She held on to the position for the rest of the year and was named the 2013 ITF Wheelchair World Champion. With Jiske Griffioen, van Koot won the doubles title in Sydney and Nottingham. The pair won their first Australian, French and US Open titles and retained the Wimbledon crown to complete the Grand Slam. Their only defeat came in the final of St Louis, their first since the Paralympic final. Van Koot also won doubles titles with Buis in Baton Rouge, Helout partnered van Koot to the title in Olot and in Jambes she won with Sharon Walraven. When partnering Lucy Shuker, van Koot finished as the runner up in Paris. Van Koot's season was curtailed by injury ruling her out of the season ending Masters.

After missing the opening events of the 2014 season, van Koot dropped to world number two in the singles rankings, behind Ellerbrock after the Australian Open. Van Koot made her first appearance of the season in Bolton where she won the title. Throughout the rest of the season van Koot added titles in Pensacola and Johannesburg to her title in Bolton. As well she reached the singles final in Baton Rouge.

She competed at the 2016 Summer Paralympics, winning a silver medal in Women's Singles, and a gold medal in Women's Doubles.

In 2026, van Koot was the women's singles champion of the inaugural Miami Open wheelchair tournament, which was played at the WT500 level and at the same time and venue as the Miami Open tournament for the ATP and the WTA tours. van Koot secured the title after beating compatriot Lizzy de Greef in three sets at the final.

== Career statistics ==
=== Grand Slam performance timelines ===
Key
W	F	SF	QF	#R	RR	Q#	DNQ	A	NH

(W) winner; (F) finalist; (SF) semifinalist; (QF) quarterfinalist; (#R) rounds 4, 3, 2, 1; (RR) round-robin stage; (Q#) qualification round; (DNQ) did not qualify; (A) absent; (NH) not held; (SR) strike rate (events won / competed); (W–L) win–loss record.
To avoid confusion and double counting, these charts are updated at the conclusion of a tournament or when the player's participation has ended.

==== Wheelchair singles ====
Tournament	2008	2009	2010	2011	2012	2013	2014	2015	2016	2017	2018	2019	2020	2021	2022	2023	2024	2025	2026	Career SR
Australian Open	1R	A	SF	QF	F	W	A	SF	F	QF	SF	SF	F	QF	F	QF	QF	F	QF	1 / 17
French Open	SF	QF	QF	SF	F	SF	F	F	QF	SF	SF	SF	SF	SF	SF	A	SF	F	1R	0 / 18
Wimbledon	NH	NH	NH	NH	NH	NH	NH	NH	F	SF	F	W	NH	QF	QF	SF	F	1R	QF	1 / 10
US Open	NH	SF	QF	F	NH	W	F	SF	NH	SF	QF	QF	A	SF	SF	QF	NH	SF		1 / 13

==== Wheelchair doubles ====
Tournament	2008	2009	2010	2011	2012	2013	2014	2015	2016	2017	2018	2019	2020	2021	2022	2023	2024	2025	2026	Career SR
Australian Open	SF	A	W	F	F	W	A	F	F	W	F	W	F	W	W	W	QF	SF	SF	7 / 17
French Open	SF	F	W	F	SF	W	F	W	F	F	W	W	W	W	W	A	W	SF	SF	9 / 18
Wimbledon	NH	A	SF	F	W	W	F	F	F	SF	SF	W	NH	SF	F	SF	QF	QF	SF	3 / 16
US Open	NH	SF	F	F	NH	W	F	W	NH	F	F	W	A	W	W	QF	NH	QF		5 / 13

=== Grand Slam tournament finals ===
==== Wheelchair singles: 17 (3 titles, 14 runner-ups) ====
Result	Year	Championship	Surface	Opponent	Score
Loss	2011	US Open	Hard	(Netherlands) Esther Vergeer	2–6, 1–6
Loss	2012	Australian Open	Hard	(Netherlands) Esther Vergeer	0–6, 0–6
Loss	2012	French Open	Clay	(Netherlands) Esther Vergeer	0–6, 0–6
Win	2013	Australian Open	Hard	(Germany) Sabine Ellerbrock	6–1, 1–6, 7–5
Win	2013	US Open	Hard	(Germany) Sabine Ellerbrock	3–6, 6–2, 7–6^{(7–3)}
Loss	2014	French Open	Clay	(Japan) Yui Kamiji	6–7^{(7–9)}, 4–6
Loss	2014	US Open	Hard	(Japan) Yui Kamiji	3–6, 3–6
Loss	2015	French Open	Clay	(Netherlands) Jiske Griffioen	0–6, 2–6
Loss	2016	Australian Open	Hard	(Netherlands) Jiske Griffioen	3–6, 5–7
Loss	2016	Wimbledon	Grass	(Netherlands) Jiske Griffioen	6–4, 0–6, 4–6
Loss	2018	Wimbledon	Grass	(Netherlands) Diede de Groot	3–6, 2–6
Win	2019	Wimbledon	Grass	(Netherlands) Diede de Groot	6–4, 4–6, 7–5
Loss	2020	Australian Open	Hard	(Japan) Yui Kamiji	2–6, 2–6
Loss	2022	Australian Open	Hard	(Netherlands) Diede de Groot	1–6, 1–6
Loss	2024	Wimbledon	Grass	(Netherlands) Diede de Groot	4–6, 4–6
Loss	2025	Australian Open	Hard	(Japan) Yui Kamiji	2–6, 2–6
Loss	2025	French Open	Clay	(Japan) Yui Kamiji	2–6, 2–6

==== Wheelchair doubles: 45 (24 titles, 21 runner-ups) ====
Result	Year	Championship	Surface	Partner	Opponents	Score
Loss	2009	French Open	Clay	(Belgium) Annick Sevenans	(Netherlands) Korie Homan (Netherlands) Esther Vergeer	2–6, 3–6
Win	2010	Australian Open	Hard	(France) Florence Gravellier	(United Kingdom) Lucy Shuker (Australia) Daniela Di Toro	6–3, 7–6^{(7–2)}
Win	2010	French Open	Clay	(Australia) Daniela Di Toro	(Netherlands) Esther Vergeer (Netherlands) Sharon Walraven	3–6, 6–3, [10–4]
Loss	2010	US Open	Hard	(Australia) Daniela Di Toro	(Netherlands) Esther Vergeer (Netherlands) Sharon Walraven	3–6, 3–6
Loss	2011	Australian Open	Hard	(Netherlands) Jiske Griffioen	(Netherlands) Esther Vergeer (Netherlands) Sharon Walraven	0–6, 2–6
Loss	2011	French Open	Clay	(Netherlands) Jiske Griffioen	(Netherlands) Esther Vergeer (Netherlands) Sharon Walraven	7–5, 4–6, [5–10]
Loss	2011	Wimbledon	Grass	(Netherlands) Jiske Griffioen	(Netherlands) Esther Vergeer (Netherlands) Sharon Walraven	4–6, 6–3, 5–7
Loss	2011	US Open	Hard	(Netherlands) Jiske Griffioen	(Netherlands) Esther Vergeer (Netherlands) Sharon Walraven	5–7, 7–6^{(10–8)}, 6–4
Loss	2012	Australian Open	Hard	(Netherlands) Marjolein Buis	(Netherlands) Esther Vergeer (Netherlands) Sharon Walraven	6–4, 2–6, 4–6
Win	2012	Wimbledon	Grass	(Netherlands) Jiske Griffioen	(United Kingdom) Lucy Shuker (United Kingdom) Jordanne Whiley	6–1, 6–2
Win	2013	Australian Open (2)	Hard	(Netherlands) Jiske Griffioen	(Netherlands) Marjolein Buis (United Kingdom) Lucy Shuker	6–4, 6–3
Win	2013	French Open (2)	Clay	(Netherlands) Jiske Griffioen	(Germany) Sabine Ellerbrock (Netherlands) Sharon Walraven	6–2, 6–3
Win	2013	Wimbledon (2)	Grass	(Netherlands) Jiske Griffioen	(Japan) Yui Kamiji (United Kingdom) Jordanne Whiley	6–4, 7–6^{(8–6)}
Win	2013	US Open	Hard	(Netherlands) Jiske Griffioen	(Germany) Sabine Ellerbrock (Japan) Yui Kamiji	6–3, 6–4
Loss	2014	French Open	Clay	(Netherlands) Jiske Griffioen	(Japan) Yui Kamiji (United Kingdom) Jordanne Whiley	6–7^{(3–7)}, 6–3, [8–10]
Loss	2014	Wimbledon	Grass	(Netherlands) Jiske Griffioen	(Japan) Yui Kamiji (United Kingdom) Jordanne Whiley	6–3, 2–6, 5–7
Loss	2014	US Open	Hard	(Netherlands) Jiske Griffioen	(Japan) Yui Kamiji (United Kingdom) Jordanne Whiley	4–6, 6–3, 3–6
Loss	2015	Australian Open	Hard	(Netherlands) Jiske Griffioen	(Japan) Yui Kamiji (United Kingdom) Jordanne Whiley	6–4, 4–6, 5–7
Win	2015	French Open (3)	Clay	(Netherlands) Jiske Griffioen	(Japan) Yui Kamiji (United Kingdom) Jordanne Whiley	7–6^{(7–1)}, 3–6, [10–8]
Loss	2015	Wimbledon	Grass	(Netherlands) Jiske Griffioen	(Japan) Yui Kamiji (United Kingdom) Jordanne Whiley	2–6, 7–5, 3–6
Win	2015	US Open (2)	Hard	(Netherlands) Jiske Griffioen	(Netherlands) Marjolein Buis (Germany) Sabine Ellerbrock	7–6^{(7–3)}, 6–1
Loss	2016	Australian Open	Hard	(Netherlands) Jiske Griffioen	(Netherlands) Marjolein Buis (Japan) Yui Kamiji	2–6, 2–6
Loss	2016	French Open	Clay	(Netherlands) Jiske Griffioen	(Japan) Yui Kamiji (United Kingdom) Jordanne Whiley	4–6, 6–4, [6–10]
Loss	2016	Wimbledon	Grass	(Netherlands) Jiske Griffioen	(Japan) Yui Kamiji (United Kingdom) Jordanne Whiley	2–6, 2–6
Win	2017	Australian Open (3)	Hard	(Netherlands) Jiske Griffioen	(Netherlands) Diede de Groot (Japan) Yui Kamiji	6–3, 6–2
Loss	2017	French Open	Clay	(Netherlands) Jiske Griffioen	(Netherlands) Marjolein Buis (Japan) Yui Kamiji	3–6, 5–7
Loss	2017	US Open	Hard	(United States) Dana Mathewson	(Netherlands) Marjolein Buis (Netherlands) Diede de Groot	4–6, 3–6
Loss	2018	Australian Open	Hard	(Netherlands) Diede de Groot	(Netherlands) Marjolein Buis (Japan) Yui Kamiji	0–6, 4–6
Win	2018	French Open (4)	Clay	(Netherlands) Diede de Groot	(Netherlands) Marjolein Buis (Japan) Yui Kamiji	6–1, 6–3
Loss	2018	US Open	Hard	(Netherlands) Marjolein Buis	(Netherlands) Diede de Groot (Japan) Yui Kamiji	3–6, 4–6
Win	2019	Australian Open (4)	Hard	(Netherlands) Diede de Groot	(Netherlands) Marjolein Buis (Germany) Sabine Ellerbrock	5–7, 7–6^{(7–4)}, [10–8]
Win	2019	French Open (5)	Clay	(Netherlands) Diede de Groot	(Netherlands) Marjolein Buis (Germany) Sabine Ellerbrock	6–1, 6–1
Win	2019	Wimbledon (3)	Grass	(Netherlands) Diede de Groot	(Netherlands) Marjolein Buis (Italy) Giulia Capocci	6–1, 6–1
Win	2019	US Open (3)	Hard	(Netherlands) Diede de Groot	(Germany) Sabine Ellerbrock (South Africa) Kgothatso Montjane	6–2, 6–0
Loss	2020	Australian Open	Hard	(Netherlands) Diede de Groot	(Japan) Yui Kamiji (United Kingdom) Jordanne Whiley	2–6, 4–6
Win	2020	French Open (6)	Clay	(Netherlands) Diede de Groot	(Japan) Yui Kamiji (United Kingdom) Jordanne Whiley	7–6^{(7–2)}, 3–6, [10–8]
Win	2021	Australian Open (5)	Hard	(Netherlands) Diede de Groot	(South Africa) Kgothatso Montjane (United Kingdom) Lucy Shuker	6–4, 6–1
Win	2021	French Open (7)	Clay	(Netherlands) Diede de Groot	(Japan) Yui Kamiji (United Kingdom) Jordanne Whiley	6–3, 6–4
Win	2021	US Open (4)	Hard	(Netherlands) Diede de Groot	(Japan) Yui Kamiji (United Kingdom) Jordanne Whiley	6–1, 6–2
Win	2022	Australian Open (6)	Hard	(Netherlands) Diede de Groot	(Japan) Yui Kamiji (United Kingdom) Lucy Shuker	7–5, 3–6, [10–2]
Win	2022	French Open (8)	Clay	(Netherlands) Diede de Groot	(Japan) Yui Kamiji (South Africa) Kgothatso Montjane	7–6^{(7–5)}, 1–6, [10–8]
Loss	2022	Wimbledon	Grass	(Netherlands) Diede de Groot	(Japan) Yui Kamiji (United States) Dana Mathewson	1–6, 5–7
Win	2022	US Open (5)	Hard	(Netherlands) Diede de Groot	(Japan) Yui Kamiji (South Africa) Kgothatso Montjane	6–2, 6–2
Win	2023	Australian Open (7)	Hard	(Netherlands) Diede de Groot	(Japan) Yui Kamiji (China) Zhu Zhenzhen	6–3, 6–2
Win	2024	French Open (9)	Clay	(Netherlands) Diede de Groot	(Japan) Yui Kamiji (South Africa) Kgothatso Montjane	6–7^{(6–8)}, 7–6^{(7–2)}, [10–4]

Preceded by Esther Vergeer	ITF Wheelchair Tennis World Champion; 2013	Succeeded by Yui Kamiji
