= Sonja Peters =

Dutch wheelchair tennis player

- Country (sports): Netherlands
- Born: 25 October 1976 (age 48)
Medal record
Paralympic Games
| Silver medal – second place | 2004 Athens | Women's singles |

Sonja Peters (born 25 October 1976) is a Dutch wheelchair tennis player. She represented the Netherlands at the 2000 Summer Paralympics and at the 2004 Summer Paralympics. She won the silver medal in the women's singles event at the 2004 Summer Paralympics.
