= Sandra Salzgeber =

Swiss wheelchair tennis player

Personal information
- Birth name: Sandra Kalt

Sport
- Country: Switzerland
- Sport: Wheelchair tennis

Sandra Salzgeber (also known as Sandra Kalt) is a Swiss wheelchair tennis player. She represented Switzerland at the 2004 Summer Paralympics. She won the bronze medal together with Karin Suter-Erath in the women's doubles event.

She also competed in the women's singles event.
