= Elena Jacinto =

Spanish wheelchair tennis player

Personal information
- Full name: Elena Jacinto Vélez
- Nationality: Spanish
- Born: 10 April 1985 (age 41) Barcelona, Spain

Sport
- Country: Spain
- Sport: Wheelchair tennis

Elena Jacinto Vélez (born 10 April 1985) is a Spanish wheelchair tennis player, whose best world ranking has been 24th. She competed at the 2012 Summer Paralympics. She trains with and is a doubles partner with fellow Spaniard, Lola Ochoa Ribes.

== Personal ==
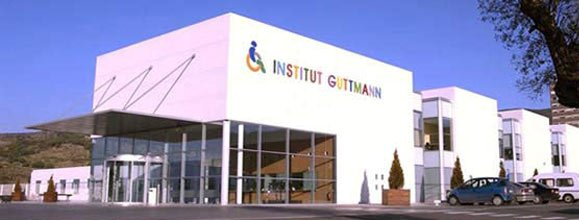
The Instituto Guttmann, she underwent rehabilitation

Jacinto was born in Barcelona, Spain, in 1985.

Around 2002, Jacinto tried to commit suicide by jumping in front of a metro train in Barcelona. She survived the attempt but was became a paraplegic. Following the accident, she received treatment for mental illness. Some of her physical rehabilitation took place at Instituto Guttmann. In 2012, she worked for DKV Seguros.

== Wheelchair tennis ==
Jacinto took up sport generally as part of mental health therapy following her suicide attempt, trying a number of different sports before settling on wheelchair tennis. Wheelchair tennis was one she tried two months after becoming a paraplegic. She claims to like the sport because it does not require another person in a wheelchair to have a game, a requirement of some other disability sports. She started competitive wheelchair tennis around 2007. Her competition wheelchair cost around €4,500 to acquire. Part of her warmup routine involves doing laps around the tennis court in her chair.

At the 2007 Wheelchair tennis World Team Cup, Jacinto lost to Margrit Fink 6–2, 6–3 in her first match of the competition. In 2011, she competed in tournaments in Tel Aviv in Israel, Amphion in France, as well as Miranda de Ebro and Burgos, Spain. In August 2011, she participated in an international tournament in Belgium. Competing in the doubles event with Lola Ochoa Ribes, Jacinto got her first victory of the season and her first victory since winning the Tournament of Casablanca in Marruevos in 2009. Following the tournament, she was ranked 24th in the world, her highest ever global ranking. The 2011 Andalucía Tennis Experience, part of the WTA circuit, included a women's wheelchair tennis event parallel to it. Jacinto was one of 32 tennis players, and 8 Spaniards, to participate in it.

In 2012, Jacinto was coached by national team coach David Sanz and trained with Ochoa . Competing with Ochoa, they won the doubles event at the 2012 Foundation Emilio Sanchez Vicario Wheelchair Tennis International Open after beating the pair of María Antonieta Ortiz from and Emmy Kayser of the United States in sets of 6–3, 3-6 and 7–6. In singles play, Jacinto lost in her opening round in straight sets against Italian Marianna Lauro by 6-3 and 6–3. At the 2012 Rivas City Wheelchair Tennis Open, she lost to Maria Torres 6–2, 6–0 in the final. It was the first time the tournament was open to women. In August 2012, she was ranked 27th in the world. She competed at the 2012 Summer Paralympics. The Games were her first. One of her matches was against Chilean Francisca Mardones.

In 2013, Jacinto competed in the Turkey-hosted world championships in the singles and doubles events. She lost in the singles event to Chilean Mardones. In the doubles competition, competing with Ochoa, she played against the Chilean pair of Macarena Cabrillana and Mardones, winning by sets of 2–6, 7–5, and 11–9.
