= Esther Vergeer =

Dutch wheelchair tennis player (born 1981)

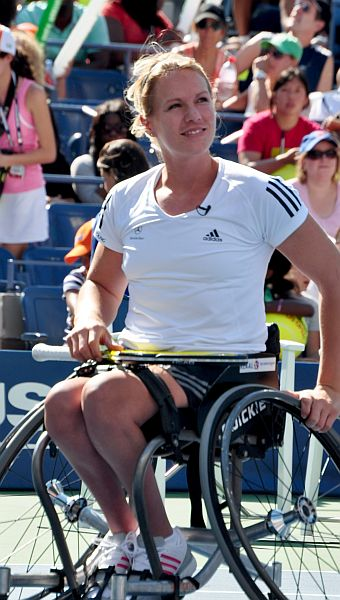
- Full name: Esther Mary Vergeer
- Country (sports): Netherlands
- Residence: Woerden, Netherlands
- Born: 18 July 1981 (age 45) Woerden, Netherlands
- Turned pro: 1995
- Retired: 2013
- Plays: Right handed
- Int. Tennis HoF: 2023 (member page)
- Official website: www.esthervergeer.nl

Singles
- Career record: 700–25 (96.6%)
- Career titles: 169
- Highest ranking: No. 1 (6 April 1999)

Grand Slam singles results
- Australian Open: W (2002, 2003, 2004, 2006, 2007, 2008, 2009, 2011, 2012)
- French Open: W (2007, 2008, 2009, 2010, 2011, 2012)
- US Open: W (2005, 2006, 2007, 2009, 2010, 2011)

Other tournaments
- Masters: W (1998, 1999, 2000, 2001, 2002, 2003, 2004, 2005, 2006, 2007, 2008, 2009, 2010, 2011)
- Paralympic Games: Gold Medal (2000, 2004, 2008, 2012)

Doubles
- Career record: 441–35 (92.6%)
- Career titles: 136
- Highest ranking: No. 1 (20 October 1998)

Grand Slam doubles results
- Australian Open: W (2003, 2004, 2006, 2007, 2008, 2009, 2011, 2012)
- French Open: W (2007, 2008, 2009, 2011, 2012)
- Wimbledon: W (2009, 2010, 2011)
- US Open: W (2005, 2006, 2007, 2009, 2010, 2011)

Other doubles tournaments
- Masters Doubles: W (2001, 2002, 2003, 2005, 2006, 2007, 2008, 2009, 2011)
- Paralympic Games: Gold Medal (2000, 2004, 2012) Silver Medal (2008)

Team competitions
- World Team Cup: Champion (1998, 2000, 2001, 2002, 2003, 2004, 2005, 2006, 2007, 2008, 2009)
Medal record
Representing Netherlands
Women's wheelchair tennis
Paralympic Games
Gold medal – first place	2000 Sydney	Women's singles
Gold medal – first place	2000 Sydney	Women's doubles
Gold medal – first place	2004 Athens	Women's singles
Gold medal – first place	2004 Athens	Women's doubles
Gold medal – first place	2008 Beijing	Women's singles
Silver medal – second place	2008 Beijing	Women's doubles
Gold medal – first place	2012 London	Women's singles
Gold medal – first place	2012 London	Women's doubles
- Last updated on: 28 January 2012.

Esther Mary Vergeer (Dutch pronunciation: [ˈɛstər vərˈɣeːr]; born 18 July 1981) is a Dutch former professional wheelchair tennis player. Vergeer won 43 major titles (21 in singles and 22 in doubles), 23 year-end championships (14 consecutive in singles and nine in doubles), and seven Paralympic gold medals (four in singles and three in doubles). She was the world No. 1 in women's wheelchair singles from 1999 to her retirement in February 2013. Vergeer went undefeated in singles for ten straight years, ending her career on a winning streak of 470 matches. She has often been named the most dominant player in professional sports.

Over the course of her career, Vergeer won 700 singles matches and lost 25. She won 169 singles titles, including four Paralympic singles gold medals, 21 major titles and 14 NEC Wheelchair Tennis Masters. Vergeer spent 668 weeks as the world No. 1, first claiming the position on 6 April 1999, regaining it on 2 October 2000, and relinquishing it on 21 January 2013 (shortly before her retirement). Vergeer was the ITF World Champion for 13 years in a row. In doubles, Vergeer won 136 titles, 27 of which were won at the majors. She has three Paralympic gold medals for doubles, and was part of the winning World Team Cup side on 12 occasions.

Vergeer went undefeated in women's singles matches for ten years, having last lost on 30 January 2003 to Daniela di Toro. Afterwards, she won 120 tournaments, 470 matches, defeated 73 different opponents and did not lose a game on 95 occasions. Further, during the streak she lost only 18 sets and was taken to match point only once, against Korie Homan in the final of the 2008 Beijing Paralympics.

== Early life ==
After a swimming lesson at the age of 6 Vergeer became dizzy and later became unconscious. She was taken to a hospital, where it was discovered that she had a build-up of fluids in her brain, as well as brain hemorrhage. Doctors placed a shunt in her brain, and Vergeer was released from the hospital six weeks later. However, in June 1989, Vergeer experienced headaches, pressure behind the eyes and pain in her neck. Despite investigations doctors found nothing. In October of that same year, Vergeer began to complain of pain around the groin. Then, during the holiday season, she had a stroke and had to have a shunt placed in her brain again. Finally, doctors discovered that Vergeer had a vascular myelopathy around her spinal cord. This abnormality caused the strokes that Vergeer experienced. On 15 January 1990, she had a nine-hour operation, which left her unable to move her legs. Vergeer had one final operation in March but was left paralyzed. During rehabilitation she learned to play volleyball, basketball, and tennis in a wheelchair. After playing basketball for several years at club level, she was invited to join the national wheelchair basketball team. She played with the Dutch team that won the European championship in 1997.

== Early career ==
During the 1996 season Vergeer won one singles title in Tilburg. She reached one other final in Melin, but she was not successful. Vergeer won two draws at other events; the A draw in Utrecht and the consolation draw in Nottingham. She also reached the final of the A draw in Antony where she was not successful. During the 1997 season Vergeer won consolation singles draws in Antony and Geneva. She also made it to one final in Jambes where she lost. Her success led to a photo in the 26 November 1998 issue of Tennis Week. She continued on and during the 2000 Summer Paralympics in Sydney she did not lose a set to win the gold medal in singles and also won the doubles title with Maaike Smit as her partner. She also won the Wheelchair Tennis masters in 1998. During the 2003 season Vergeer was part of the team that won the World Team Cup for the sixteenth time defeating the US in the final. She also won a title in Nottingham. During the 2004 season Vergeer won singles titles in Boca Raton and Nottingham.

== Professional career ==
=== 2005–2008 ===
During the 2006 season Vergeer won singles titles in Nottingham, Atlanta and San Diego. In San Diego, Homan took Vergeer to three sets; it was the first set she had lost since August 2004. 2006 Won masters. With Griffioen, Vergeer won doubles titles in Nottingham, Atlanta and San Diego. Won masters doubles.

In 2007 Vergeer won singles titles in Sydney, Boca Raton, Cajun, Japan, Paris, Amsterdam, Jambes, Nottingham, Utrecht, Atlanta and San Diego. Vergeer also won all the Grand Slam titles in Melbourne, Paris and New York. During Roland Garros, Vergeer chalked up her 250th consecutive singles win. Vergeer rounded the year off by claiming her tenth Masters title and the ITF World Champion. In doubles competitions she won titles with Griffioen in Sydney, Boca Raton, Japan, Paris, Nottingham and San Diego. The pair also won the Masters and lost for the first time as a team in Utrecht. Vergeer also won the Australian and US Opens with Griffioen. Vergeer claimed the Grand Slam by also winning Roland Garros with Smit. Vergeer won two other titles in 2007 with Graviller in Cajun and Aniek van Koot in Jambes. World team cup.

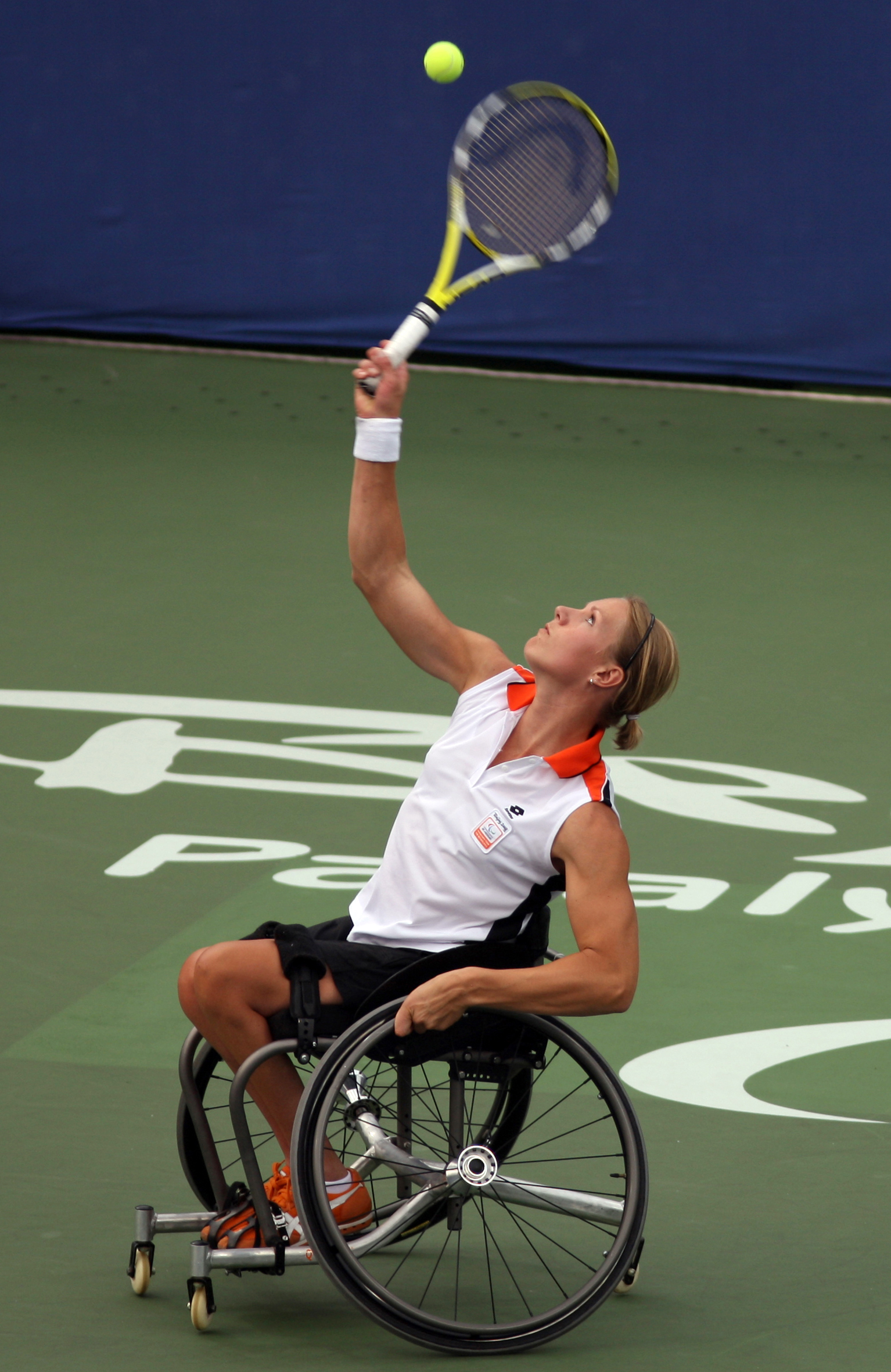
Vergeer serves during a game at the 2008 Beijing Paralympics.

Vergeer won both of the Slam titles that were available in 2008 with Griffioen. As a team they also won in Pensacola, Boca Raton, Fukuoka, Paris, Nottingham and Utrecht. The pair also reached the final of Sydney but this was unplayed due to rain. At the Paralympic Games as they suffered only their second loss as a partnership and claimed the silver medal. But they finished the year on a high as a pair by winning the Masters doubles. She also won in Jambes with Homan. In singles competitions both of the Slams that were available in 2008 were won by Vergeer. Vergeer also won titles in Sydney, Pensacola, Boca Raton, Fukuoka, Paris, Jambes, Nottingham, Utrecht At the Paralympics Vergeer saved two match points against Homan before going on to win her third singles gold medal and to preserve the streak. The pair met again in the Masters final with Vergeer coming out on top again. Vergeer finished the year as number one in the World team cup

=== 2009–2012 ===
Vergeer won the Grand Slam in 2009. Additionally Vergeer won titles in Nottingham, Utrecht and St Louis. Vergeer capped the year by winning her twelfth Masters title after being two points away from defeat in the final against Homan. In December Vergeer celebrated ten years at number one and was named the 2009 World Champion. With Homan in doubles competitions, Vergeer won the Grand Slam. As a pair they also won in Nottingham and at the Masters. Vergeer also lost in the final of Utrecht with Smit. World Team cup

In 2010, Vergeer won Roland Garros and the US Open. She also won in Nottingham and St Louis. Vergeer finished the year with the Masters title, winning her four hundredth match in a row and the World number One. In doubles, Vergeer only played in the Grand Slams where she lost in the final of Roland Garros with Walraven but they got back on track with wins at Wimbledon and the US Open.

Vergeer won the singles Grand Slam in 2011. Vergeer also won titles in Pensacola, Boca Raton, Nottingham and St Louis. Finishing the year she won the Masters. New York. Vergeer finished the year as the World Number One for the twelfth year in succession, having won eight singles titles. In doubles with Walraven, Vergeer won all four Grand Slams, recovering from 5–2 down in the final set at Wimbledon and a 6–1 second set tie-break gap at the US Open. As a team they also were runners-up in Boca Raton. The pair also won the Masters. World team Cup.

In 2012, Vergeer won titles in Melbourne, Sydney, Australian Open, Pensacola, Boca Raton, Eton Manor, Roland Garros, Geneva and Nottingham. At the 2012 Paralympics Vergeer became the most decorated Wheelchair tennis player in the history of the Games. At Eton Manor she won Gold in the singles and doubles; the victory in the singles was the fourth time that she had won the tournament. Her success in the doubles came alongside Buis. In doubles competitions, Vergeer won the Australian Open with Walraven, Boca Raton, Roland Garros Geneva with Smit for their first title as a team since Roland Garros 2007. runner-up Pensacola with Walraven, Wimbledon and Nottingham.

== Wins and accolades ==
Vergeer has won 169 singles and 136 doubles titles at international tournaments. Her overall record is 700 wins and 25 losses in singles, and 441 wins and 34 losses in doubles. In singles, she has won 21 Grand Slam, 14-year-end championship, and 4 Paralympic titles while in doubles she has shared 22 Grand Slam, 9-year-end, and 3 Paralympic titles. She has also been part of the Dutch team that has won 14 World Team Cups.

From 31 March 2001 until her retirement in 2013, Vergeer lost only one singles match (on 30 January 2003 at the Sydney International to Daniela Di Toro from Australia), winning 559 of her last 560 matches. Between August 2004 and October 2006 she even won 250 consecutive sets, only one of which ended with a tiebreaker. After her final tournament, when she won the Paralympic gold medal in September 2012, Vergeer had extended her winning streak to 470 matches.

She has been nominated six times for the Laureus World Sports Award for Sportsperson of the Year with a Disability, winning it twice, in 2002 and 2008. In 2023 she was announced as a new inductee to the International Tennis Hall of Fame.

In October 2010 she posed nude for ESPN The Magazine's annual Body Issue, marking the first time the magazine has featured a disabled athlete in the Body Issue.

In December 2010 Esther Vergeer was featured on CNN for her tennis record of 401 straight wins, receiving congratulations from Roger Federer and Kim Clijsters.

== Significant titles ==
- Australian Open: doubles 2003–04, 2006–09, 2011–12
- French Open: doubles 2007–09, 2011
- Wimbledon: doubles 2009, 2010, 2011
- US Open: doubles 1998–2000, 2003, 2005–07, 2009, 2010
- British Open: singles 2000–2010, doubles 1998–2004, 2006–09
- Japan Open: singles 2004, 2007–08, doubles 2004, 2007–08
- NEC Wheelchair Tennis Masters ("World Championships"): singles 1998–2010, doubles 2001–2003, 2005–2009
- Paralympic Games: singles 2000, 2004, 2008, 2012 & doubles 2000, 2004, 2012

== Career statistics ==
=== Grand slam finals ===
==== Wheelchair singles (21 titles) ====
Result	Year	Championship	Surface	Opponent	Score
Win	2002	Wheelchair Classic 8's at Australian Open (1)	Hard	(Australia) Daniela di Toro	6–2, 6–0
Win	2003	Wheelchair Classic 8's at Australian Open (2)	Hard	(Australia) Daniela di Toro	2–6, 6–0, 6–3
Win	2004	Wheelchair Classic 8's at Australian Open (3)	Hard	(Australia) Daniela di Toro	4–6, 6–3, 6–1
Win	2005	US Open (1)	Hard	(Netherlands) Korie Homan	6–2, 6–1
Win	2006	Wheelchair Classic 8's at Australian Open (4)	Hard	(Netherlands) Jiske Griffioen	6–4, 6–0
Win	2006	US Open (2)	Hard	(Netherlands) Sharon Walraven	6–1, 6–2
Win	2007	Australian Open (5)	Hard	(France) Florence Gravellier	6–1, 6–0
Win	2007	French Open (1)	Clay	(France) Florence Gravellier	6–3, 5–7, 6–2
Win	2007	US Open (3)	Hard	(France) Florence Gravellier	6–3, 6–1
Win	2008	Australian Open (6)	Hard	(Netherlands) Korie Homan	6–3, 6–3
Win	2008	French Open (2)	Clay	(Netherlands) Korie Homan	6–2, 6–2
Win	2009	Australian Open (7)	Hard	(Netherlands) Korie Homan	6–4, 6–2
Win	2009	French Open (3)	Clay	(Netherlands) Korie Homan	6–2, 7–5
Win	2009	US Open (4)	Hard	(Netherlands) Korie Homan	6–0, 6–0
Win	2010	French Open (4)	Clay	(Netherlands) Sharon Walraven	6–0, 6–0
Win	2010	US Open (5)	Hard	(Australia) Daniela di Toro	6–0, 6–0
Win	2011	Australian Open (8)	Hard	(Australia) Daniela di Toro	6–0, 6–0
Win	2011	French Open (5)	Clay	(Netherlands) Marjolein Buis	6–0, 6–2
Win	2011	US Open (6)	Hard	(Netherlands) Aniek van Koot	6–2, 6–1
Win	2012	Australian Open (9)	Hard	(Netherlands) Aniek van Koot	6–0, 6–0
Win	2012	French Open (6)	Clay	(Netherlands) Aniek van Koot	6–0, 6–0

=== Performance timelines ===
Key
W	F	SF	QF	#R	RR	Q#	P#	DNQ	A	Z#	PO	G	S	B	NMS	NTI	P	NH

(W) winner; (F) finalist; (SF) semifinalist; (QF) quarterfinalist; (#R) rounds 4, 3, 2, 1; (RR) round-robin stage; (Q#) qualification round; (P#) preliminary round; (DNQ) did not qualify; (A) absent; (Z#) Davis/Fed Cup Zonal Group (with number indication) or (PO) play-off; (G) gold, (S) silver or (B) bronze Olympic/Paralympic medal; (NMS) not a Masters tournament; (NTI) not a Tier I tournament; (P) postponed; (NH) not held; (SR) strike rate (events won / competed); (W–L) win–loss record.

==== Wheelchair singles ====
Tournament	1998	1999	2000	2001	2002	2003	2004	2005	2006	2007	2008	2009	2010	2011	2012	Career SR	Career Win %
Grand Slam tournaments
Australian Open	Not held				W	W	W	A	W	W	W	W	A	W	W	9 / 9	100%
French Open	Not held									W	W	W	W	W	W	6 / 6	100%
US Open	Not held							W	W	W	NH	W	W	W	NH	6 / 6	100%
Year-end championship
Wheelchair Tennis Masters	W	W	W	W	W	W	W	W	W	W	W	W	W	W		14 / 14	100%
National representation
Paralympics	Not held		G	Not held			G	Not held			G	Not held			G	4 / 4	100%

==== Wheelchair doubles ====
Tournament	2000	2001	2002	2003	2004	2005	2006	2007	2008	2009	2010	2011	2012	Career SR	Career Win %
Grand Slam tournaments
Australian Open	Not held		F	W	W	A	W	W	W	W	A	W	W	8 / 9	89%
French Open	Not held							W	W	W	F	W	W	5 / 6	89%
Wimbledon	Not held									W	W	W	SF	3 / 4	75%
US Open	Not held					W	W	W	NH	W	W	W	NH	6 / 6	100%
Year-end championship
Wheelchair Tennis Masters	F	W	W	W	LQ	W	W	W	W	W	A	W		9 / 11	82%
National representation
Paralympics	G	Not held			G	Not held			S	Not held			G	3 / 4	75%

Awards
Preceded by Daniela di Toro	ITF Wheelchair Tennis World Champion; 2000–2012	Succeeded by Aniek van Koot
Preceded by First Award	Female Player of the Year; 2001–2003	Succeeded by Daniela di Toro
Preceded by Vinny Lauwers; Martin Braxenthaler	Laureus World Sportsperson of the Year with a Disability; 2002; 2008	Succeeded by Michael Milton; Daniel Dias
Preceded by First award Jiske Griffioen	Year End Number 1 – Doubles Award; 2003–2004; 2007–2008 (with Griffioen)	Succeeded by Florence Gravellier; Korie Homan
Preceded by First award Kenny van Weeghel; Annette Roozen / Marion Nijhof; Monique van der Vorst	Dutch Disabled Sportswoman of the Year; 2002, 2003; 2005; 2008; 2010	Succeeded by Kenny van Weeghel; Pieter Gruijters; Monique van der Vorst; Thierry Schmitter
