= Ratana Techamaneewat =

Thai wheelchair tennis player

Personal information
- Nationality: Thai

Sport
- Country: Thailand
- Sport: Wheelchair tennis
Medal record
Paralympic Games
Silver medal – second place	2004 Athens	Women's doubles

Ratana Techamaneewat, also known as Chanungarn Techamaneewat, is a Thai wheelchair tennis player.

Techamaneewat competed at the 2004 Paralympic Games where she won a silver medal in the women's doubles event. She also competed at the 2012 Paralympic Games.
