= Karin Korb =

American wheelchair tennis player

- Country (sports): United States
- Residence: Birmingham, Alabama, United States
- Born: 1967 (age 57–58); Passaic, New Jersey, United States
- Turned pro: 1999
- Retired: 2008
- Plays: Right-handed (one-handed backhand)
- College: Kean University (undergraduate); Georgia State University

Singles
- Highest ranking: No. 11 (June 12, 2000)

Other tournaments
- Paralympic Games: 1st Round (2000, 2004)

Doubles
- Highest ranking: No. 11 (August 7, 2000)

Other doubles tournaments
- Paralympic Games: 1st Round (2004)

Karin Korb (born 1967) is a retired American wheelchair tennis player of German parentage who competed in international level events. She has participated at the Summer Paralympics twice. She was the first disabled person to receive a Division I athletic scholarship to Georgia State University to play intercollegiate wheelchair tennis. Prior to entering Georgia State and earning her master's degree there, Korb graduated with a bachelor's counterpart from Division III and thus non-scholarship Kean University in her birth state, New Jersey.

When she was 17, Korb broke her back after falling badly from a gymnastics vault which left her paralyzed from the waist down and has used a wheelchair since the accident. Raised in Clifton, New Jersey, she graduated from Clifton High School, where she was chosen as homecoming queen in her senior year.

Korb played tennis at the age of 27. She is a feminist since she was 10.
