= Jiske Griffioen =

Dutch wheelchair tennis player

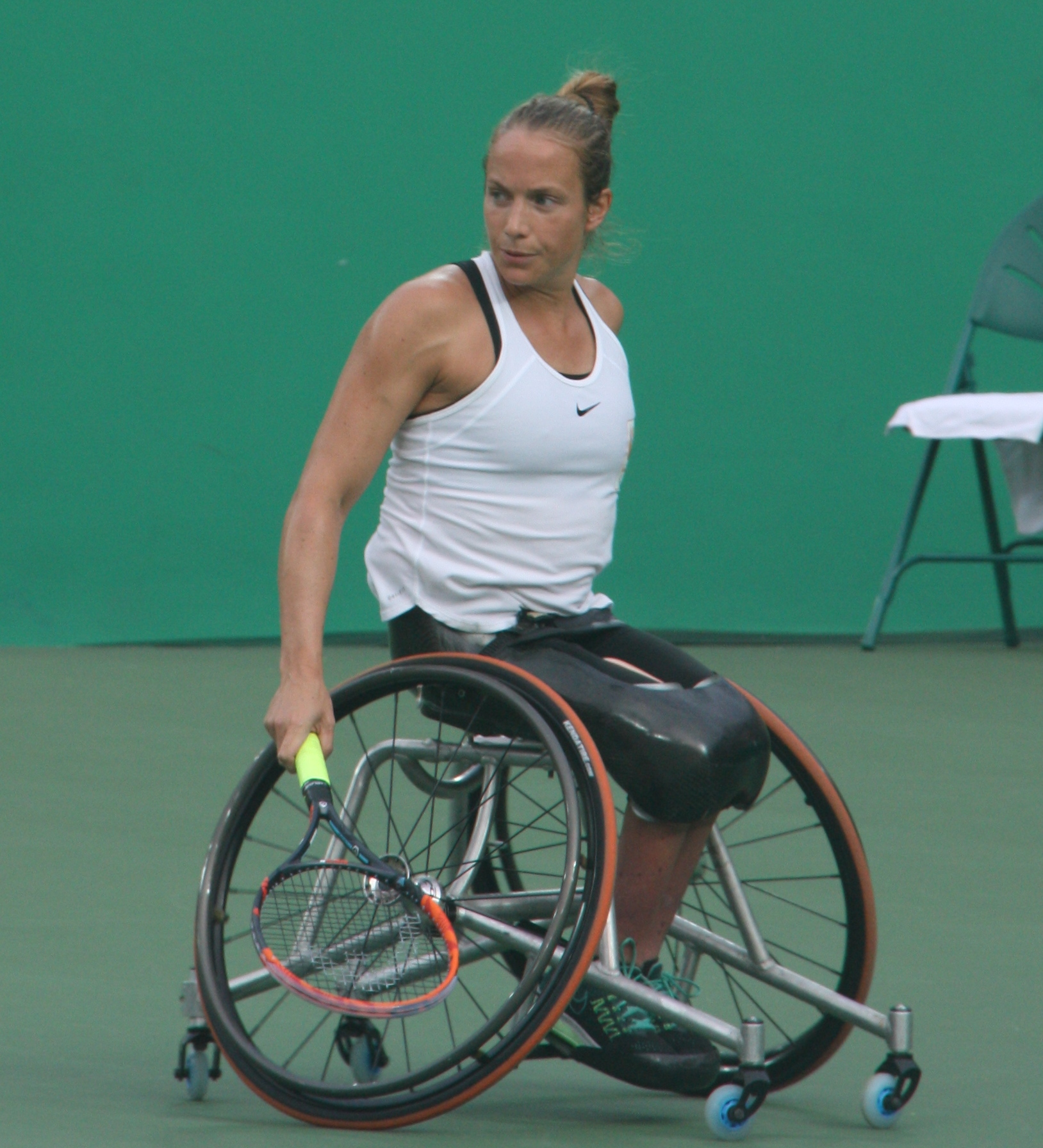
- Griffioen in 2010
- Country (sports): Netherlands
- Residence: Woerden, Netherlands
- Born: 17 April 1985 (age 41) Woerden, Netherlands
- Turned pro: 2001
- Plays: Right handed
- Official website: www.jiskegriffioen.com

Singles
- Career record: 508–173
- Highest ranking: No. 1 (8 June 2015)

Grand Slam singles results
- Australian Open: W (2015, 2016)
- French Open: W (2015)
- Wimbledon: W (2016)
- US Open: SF (2007, 2010, 2011, 2014, 2015, 2022, 2023)

Other tournaments
- Masters: W (2012, 2015, 2016)
- Paralympic Games: Gold Medal (2016)

Doubles
- Career record: 401–90
- Highest ranking: No. 1 (25 July 2005)

Grand Slam doubles results
- Australian Open: W (2006, 2007, 2008, 2013, 2017, 2024)
- French Open: W (2008, 2013, 2015)
- Wimbledon: W (2012, 2013, 2023)
- US Open: W (2006, 2007, 2013, 2015)

Other doubles tournaments
- Masters Doubles: W (2004, 2005, 2006, 2007, 2008, 2012, 2015)
- Paralympic Games: Gold Medal (2016)
- Last updated on: 5 November 2017.

Jiske Griffioen (born 17 April 1985) is a Dutch professional wheelchair tennis player. Griffioen is a 20-time major champion (four singles and 16 doubles), Paralympic gold medalist, seven-time Masters champion, and a former world No. 1. Alongside Aniek van Koot, Griffioen completed the Grand Slam in doubles in 2013. In singles, Griffioen is a three-time Masters champion (2012, 2015, 2016), Paralympic gold medalist, four-time major champion, and a former world No. 1.

Griffioen was born with spina bifida. She played wheelchair basketball representing her nation at the 2000 Sydney Paralympics, aged 14.

== Tennis career ==
=== 2001–2004 ===
In 2001, Griffioen won three singles draws in as many weeks when she won the second draw in Zoetermeer, followed by the consolation draw in Jambes and the second draw in Amsterdam. Griffioen did not win another tournament draw until she won the 2002 consolation draw in Nottingham. This success was followed by her first final in Antwerp where she lost to Sharon Walraven. Griffioen had further success in 2002 when she won the consolation draw in St Louis. In the 2003 season, Griffioen won the consolation draw in Plock, followed by consolation draw wins at the Dutch and Swiss Opens before she lost in the final in Antwerp to Walraven. Another consolation draw win in Italy and another final defeat to Walraven in Prague followed to close the season. Griffioen finished 17th in the world rankings in 2003, having reached the last 16 of the British and US Opens during the season.

In 2004, Griffioen lost in the quarterfinals of the Australian Open super series event to Esther Vergeer. Griffioen won her first singles title in Christchurch. This was followed by more success in Bein, Cuneo, Prostejov and Amsterdam. Griffioen was the runner up in the Masters. In doubles competitions with Korie Homan she won the Masters and they were finalists in Prostejov. Griffioen also took titles with Maaike Smit in San Diego and alongside Vergeer in Japan Open and Kobe. Part of the winning team at the World team cup. As a late replacement in the Paralympic Games, Griffioen exited in the first round of the singles and the quarterfinals of the doubles with Peters.

=== 2005–2008 ===
Three singles title in Nottingham, Seoul and Japan graced Griffioen in 2005. She was the runner up in Sydney, Miami, Brasilia, Paris, Dutch Open, Hilton Head, Atlanta and San Diego. Additionally Griffioen finished third at the Masters. In doubles play she won the masters doubles with Esther Vergeer; along with titles in Boca Raton, Amsterdam, Utrecht, Paris, Dutch Open, Hilton Head, Atlanta and San Diego. Nottingham with Aniek van Koot. Griffioen was also part of the Netherlands' World Team Cup success. Prostejov, with Belgium. Seoul Japan Open, Florence Gravellier double. Melbourne runner up.

During 2006, Griffioen won one singles title in Prostejov. She made the final of singles events at the Wheelchair Classic 8's at the Australian Open and in Nottingham. Finished third in the Masters after losing in the semifinals. In doubles competitions with Vergeer, Griffioen won in Sydney, Melbourne, Boca Raton, Paris, Nottingham, Utrecht, Atlanta, San Diego and the Masters. Griffioen also won the Wheelchair Classic 8's at the Australian Open and the US Open with Vergeer. Playing alongside Maaike Smit Griffioen was the champion in Fukuoka and with Sharon Walraven she took the title in Prostejov. Inadditon with Ameryckx she won in Nottingham. Griffioen was part of the Netherlands' World Team Cup squad who won the competition for a nineteenth time.

During singles competitions in the 2007 season, Griffioen won titles in Seoul, Prostejov and St Louis. She was also the runner up in Boca Raton. At the Masters Griffioen lost in the semifinals before beating Walraven for third. With Vergeer in doubles, Griffioen won titles in Sydney, Boca Raton, Japan, Nottingham and San Diego. They also won Slam titles in Melbourne and New York; before the pair finished the year by winning their third masters doubles. As a pair they suffered defeat first time in Utrecht. Griffioen also won in Pensacola and St Louis with Walraven and finished runner up in Nottingham with van Koot. She also won in Prostejov with Gravillier. Griffioen was part of the Netherlands team that partook in the World Team Cup, winning the competition for the twentieth time.

During singles competitions in 2008, Griffioen won two titles in Sardinia and St Louis. She also made the final in Christchurch and Torino. In the singles of the Paralympic Games, Griffioen lost in the semifinals winning just one game against Vergeer and failed to the bronze medal match against Florence Gravellier. In the Masters Griffioen lost in the semis of the singles. In doubles competitions Griffioen won both of the doubles Grand Slam titles that were played in 2008 with Vergeer; the Australian Open and Roland Garros. However the pair could only win the silver medal at the Paralympic Games as they suffered only their second loss as a partnership. But they finished the year on a high as a pair by winning the Masters doubles. The team also won in Pensacola, Boca Raton, Fukuoka, Paris, Nottingham and Utrecht. The pair also reached the final of Sydney but this was unplayed due to rain. Additionally with van Koot, Griffioen picked up titles in Christchurch and Sardinia. Griffioen represented her nation in a triumphant campaign at the World Team Cup. Notably Griffioen's semifinal defeat to Vergeer in Utrecht marked the first time that she had taken a set off her compatriot.

=== 2009–2012 ===
Griffioen reached one singles final in 2009 losing in Sydney to Korie Homan. At the slams, Griffioen lost in quarterfinals of all three Grand Slam tournaments. Griffioen failed to progress beyond the group stage of the Masters and finished seventh overall. In the doubles events, Griffioen lost in the semifinals of all four Grand Slam tournaments with Florence Gravellier. As a team they also reached a final in Nottingham and were victorious in Sydney and Paris. Griffioen also won titles in Utrecht and St Louis with Homan and with Buis in Sardinia. At the season ending Masters she played with Aniek van Koot and reached the final. Griffioen helped her nation win the World Team Cup.

Starting the 2010 season, Griffioen won three tournaments early in the season in Adelaide, Brisbane and Sydney before winning only once more in Sardinia. Griffioen also reached the final in Nottingham and St. Louis. At the end of the year Masters Griffioen lost in the semis of the singles. In the Grand Slams Griffieon lost in the semifinals of the Australian Open and the US Open and the quarterfinals of Roland Garros. In doubles competitions Griffioen did not partake in the Australian Open due to Homan pulling out through injury. Griffioen participated in the other three slam tournaments with Alix Gravellier reaching the semifinals of all three, including in the Frenchwoman's last tournament. Griffioen also reached four doubles finals losing in Florida and Paris; but winning in Sardinia and St Louis. At the World Team Cup Griffioen helped the Netherlands to a 23rd women's title. At the end of the year Griffioen visited the Silver Fund's projects in Kenya and Tanzania.

2011 was a highly successful year as Griffioen won two singles tournaments and seven doubles titles. Griffioen's singles success came at the Japan Open, defeating Buis in the final, and at the Open Memorial Santi Silvas, beating Sabine Ellerbrock. Griffioen also reached the final of the singles competitions in Sydney, Pansacola, Nottingham and St Louis. In the Grand Slams Griffioen was eliminated at the semifinals of all three events. At the Masters Griffioen lost in the semifinals of the singles to van Koot, but went on to defeat Buis to claim third. Partnering van Koot in the doubles events the pair won titles in Sydney, Pensacola, Boca Raton, Paris, Nottingham and St. Louis. Griffioen, in addition, won a doubles title with Sevenans in Olot. With van Koot, Griffioen lost in the final of all four Grand Slams to Esther Vergeer and Sharon Walraven, including from 5–2 up in the final set at Wimbledon and a 6–1 second set tiebreak lead at the US Open. Additionally the pair also lost in the final of the Japan Open and the Masters. At the end of 2011 she became Amsterdam Sportswoman of the year.

I'm very happy. I had a tough draw here. Facing Esther (Vergeer) in the semis wasn't easy. I played well, but I couldn't beat her, so then you have only one chance left for a medal and you play a tough opponent, so I am very happy to win this one.

— Griffioen's reaction to winning a Paralympic singles medal.

During the 2012 season Griffioen claimed two singles titles; with this successes coming in Atlanta and Nottingham. She was also the runner up in Cajan. At the Paralympic Games, Griffioen reached the semifinal of the singles where she lost to Vergeer, however she went on to take bronze, her first singles medal in three games, defeating Ellerbrock. At the end of season Masters in the absence of Vergeer, Griffioen reached her second final and defeated van Koot for her first title. In doubles play Griffioen teamed up with van Koot, the pair won six titles including in Cajan, Pensacola, Paris and Nottingham. The pair won their first Grand Slam as a team at Wimbledon and claimed the silver medal at the Paralympics. To finish the year the pair claimed their first Masters doubles title as a team. In the second Grand Slam event of the year Griffioen exited both singles and doubles events in the semifinals. Griffioen also represented her country in the World Team Cup, where she guided her country to win the competition for the 25th time.

=== 2013–2017 ===
During the 2013 season, Griffioen won singles titles in Sydney, Melbourne, Rue and Nottingham. Griffioen was also a finalist in Brisbane. During the Grand Slam events, Griffioen lost a tight match to Marjolein Buis in the first round of the Australian Open; with both players having won the same number of points. Griffioen reached the final of Roland Garros, where she lost to Sabine Ellerbrock In New York, Griffioen lost in the first round to van Koot. At the season ending Masters, Griffioen made it into the final, and let slip a 4–1 lead in the deciding set, to Yui Kamiji, losing the last five games of the match. With Aniek van Koot, Griffioen won the doubles title in Sydney and Nottingham. The pair won their first Australian, French and US Open titles and retained the Wimbledon crown to complete the Grand Slam. Their only defeat came in the final of St Louis, their first since the Paralympic final. At the season ending Masters, Griffioen teamed up with Sharon Walraven and finished third. At the end of the season Griffioen was named the year end world number one for doubles. Griffioen also represented her nation at the World Team Cup and helped the Netherlands to a 26th title.

Griffioen won singles titles in Sydney, Baton Rouge, St. Louis, Sardina, Rue and Nottingham during the 2014 season. Over the year, Griffioen was the losing finalist in Pensacola and Lizuka. At the Grand Slam events she lost in the semifinals of all three tournaments. At the season ending Masters, Griffioen reached the final undefeated, including a win over van Koot, who she lost to in three sets in the championship match.

At the 2015 Australian Open, Griffioen won her maiden Grand Slam singles title; defeating Buis, van Koot and Yui Kamiji in straight sets to win the championship. She won again the tournament in 2016.

In October 2017, she retired stating that she did not have the fire anymore to complete. Griffioen stated that she would take up a role in the media. During Griffioen's career she won 59 singles titles and 106 doubles titles and held the World Number One spot in singles for 106 weeks between 2015 and 2017.

=== Coming out of retirement ===
In 2019, Griffioen came out of retirement. Partnering Diede de Groot, she won the women's doubles wheelchair tennis title at the 2024 Australian Open, defeating Yui Kamiji and Kgothatso Montjane in the final.

== Career statistics ==
=== Performance timelines ===
Key
W	F	SF	QF	#R	RR	Q#	DNQ	A	NH

(W) winner; (F) finalist; (SF) semifinalist; (QF) quarterfinalist; (#R) rounds 4, 3, 2, 1; (RR) round-robin stage; (Q#) qualification round; (DNQ) did not qualify; (A) absent; (NH) not held; (SR) strike rate (events won / competed); (W–L) win–loss record.

==== Wheelchair singles ====
Tournament	2005	2006	2007	2008	2009	2010	2011	2012	2013	2014	2015	2016	2017	/	2022	2023	2024	2025	2026	SR	W–L
Australian Open	QF	F	SF	SF	QF	SF	SF	A	QF	SF	W	W	F		QF	SF	SF	QF	1R	2 / 17	20–14
French Open	Not held		A	QF	QF	QF	SF	SF	F	SF	W	QF	QF		QF	SF	1R	1R	1R	1 / 15	11–14
Wimbledon	Not held											W	QF		SF	F	QF	1R	1R	1 / 7	7–6
US Open	A	QF	SF	NH	QF	SF	SF	NH	QF	SF	SF	NH	A		SF	SF	NH	1R	1R	0 / 12	7–12
Win–loss	0–1	2–2	3–2	2–2	0–3	2–3	3–3	1–1	2–3	3–3	7–1	6–1	2–3		3–4	8–4	3–3	1–4	0–4	4 / 50	45–46

=== Wheelchair doubles ===
Tournament	2005	2006	2007	2008	2009	2010	2011	2012	2013	2014	2015	2016	2017	/	2022	2023	2024	2025	2026	SR	W–L
Australian Open	SF	W	W	W	SF	SF (Note: Griffioen and her partner withdrew before the semi final of the 2010 Australian Open, which does not officially count as a loss.)	F	A	W	F	F	F	W		SF	QF	W	SF (Note: Griffioen and her partner got a walkover in the quarter final of the 2025 Australian Open, which does not officially count as a win.)	QF	6 / 17	17–11
French Open	Not held		A	W	SF	SF	F	SF	W	F	W	F	F		QF	QF	QF	A	QF	3 / 14	8–11
Wimbledon	Not held				SF	SF	F	W	W	F	F	F	A		SF	W	F	A	QF	3 / 12	12–9
US Open	A	W	W	NH	SF	SF	F	NH	W	F	W	NH	A		SF (Note: Griffioen and her partner withdrew before the semi final of the 2022 US Open, which does not officially count as a loss.)	F (Note: Griffioen and her partner withdrew before the final of the 2023 US Open, which does not officially count as a loss.)	NH	SF	QF	5 / 11	13-4
Win–loss	0–1	4–0	5–0	5–0	0–4	0–3	4–4	2–1	6–0	4–4	6–2	3–3	3–1		1–3	3–2	5–2	0–1	0–4	16 / 55	47–36

=== Grand Slam Finals ===
==== Wheelchair singles 8 (4 titles, 4 runner ups) ====
Result	Year	Championship	Surface	Opponent	Score
Loss	2006	Australian Open	Hard	(Netherlands) Esther Vergeer	4–6, 0–6
Loss	2013	French Open	Clay	(Germany) Sabine Ellerbrock	3–6, 6–3, 1–6
Win	2015	Australian Open	Hard	(Japan) Yui Kamiji	6–3, 7–5
Win	2015	French Open	Clay	(Netherlands) Aniek van Koot	6–0, 6–2
Win	2016	Australian Open	Hard	(Netherlands) Aniek van Koot	6–3, 7–5
Win	2016	Wimbledon	Grass	(Netherlands) Aniek van Koot	4–6, 6–0, 6–4
Loss	2017	Australian Open	Hard	(Japan) Yui Kamiji	7–6, 3–6, 3–6
Loss	2023	Wimbledon	Grass	(Netherlands) Diede de Groot	2–6, 1–6

==== Wheelchair doubles 31 (16 titles, 15 runner ups) ====
Result	Year	Championship	Surface	Partner	Opponents	Score
Win	2006	Australian Open	Hard	(Netherlands) Esther Vergeer	(Canada) Yuka Chokyu (Japan) Mie Yaosa	6–2, 6–0
Win	2006	US Open	Hard	(Netherlands) Esther Vergeer	(Netherlands) Korie Homan (Netherlands) Maaike Smit	6–4, 6–4
Win	2007	Australian Open (2)	Hard	(Netherlands) Esther Vergeer	(France) Florence Gravellier (Netherlands) Korie Homan	6–0, 3–6, [10–6]
Win	2007	US Open (2)	Hard	(Netherlands) Esther Vergeer	(Netherlands) Korie Homan (Netherlands) Sharon Walraven	6–1, 6–1
Win	2008	Australian Open (3)	Hard	(Netherlands) Esther Vergeer	(Netherlands) Korie Homan (Netherlands) Sharon Walraven	6–3, 6–1
Win	2008	French Open	Clay	(Netherlands) Esther Vergeer	(Netherlands) Korie Homan (Netherlands) Sharon Walraven	6–4, 6–4
Loss	2011	Australian Open	Hard	(Netherlands) Aniek van Koot	(Netherlands) Esther Vergeer (Netherlands) Sharon Walraven	0–6, 2–6
Loss	2011	French Open	Clay	(Netherlands) Aniek van Koot	(Netherlands) Esther Vergeer (Netherlands) Sharon Walraven	7–5, 4–6, [5–10]
Loss	2011	Wimbledon	Grass	(Netherlands) Aniek van Koot	(Netherlands) Esther Vergeer (Netherlands) Sharon Walraven	4–6, 6–3, 5–7
Loss	2011	US Open	Hard	(Netherlands) Aniek van Koot	(Netherlands) Esther Vergeer (Netherlands) Sharon Walraven	5–7, 7–6^{(10–8)}, 4–6
Win	2012	Wimbledon	Grass	(Netherlands) Aniek van Koot	(United Kingdom) Lucy Shuker (United Kingdom) Jordanne Whiley	6–1, 6–2
Win	2013	Australian Open (4)	Hard	(Netherlands) Aniek van Koot	(Netherlands) Marjolein Buis (United Kingdom) Lucy Shuker	6–4, 6–3
Win	2013	French Open (2)	Clay	(Netherlands) Aniek van Koot	(Germany) Sabine Ellerbrock (Netherlands) Sharon Walraven	6–2, 6–3
Win	2013	Wimbledon (2)	Grass	(Netherlands) Aniek van Koot	(Japan) Yui Kamiji (United Kingdom) Jordanne Whiley	6–4, 7–6^{(8–6)}
Win	2013	US Open (3)	Hard	(Netherlands) Aniek van Koot	(Germany) Sabine Ellerbrock (Japan) Yui Kamiji	6–3, 6–4
Loss	2014	Australian Open	Hard	(Netherlands) Marjolein Buis	(Japan) Yui Kamiji (United Kingdom) Jordanne Whiley	2–6, 7–6^{(7–3)}, 2–6
Loss	2014	French Open	Clay	(Netherlands) Aniek van Koot	(Japan) Yui Kamiji (United Kingdom) Jordanne Whiley	6–7^{(3–7)}, 6–3, [8–10]
Loss	2014	Wimbledon	Grass	(Netherlands) Aniek van Koot	(Japan) Yui Kamiji (United Kingdom) Jordanne Whiley	6–3, 2–6, 5–7
Loss	2014	US Open	Hard	(Netherlands) Aniek van Koot	(Japan) Yui Kamiji (United Kingdom) Jordanne Whiley	4–6, 6–3, 3–6
Loss	2015	Australian Open	Hard	(Netherlands) Aniek van Koot	(Japan) Yui Kamiji (United Kingdom) Jordanne Whiley	6–4, 4–6, 5–7
Win	2015	French Open (3)	Clay	(Netherlands) Aniek van Koot	(Japan) Yui Kamiji (United Kingdom) Jordanne Whiley	7–6^{(7–1)}, 3–6, [10–8]
Loss	2015	Wimbledon	Grass	(Netherlands) Aniek van Koot	(Japan) Yui Kamiji (United Kingdom) Jordanne Whiley	2–6, 7–5, 3–6
Win	2015	US Open (4)	Hard	(Netherlands) Aniek van Koot	(Netherlands) Marjolein Buis (Germany) Sabine Ellerbrock	7–6^{(7–3)}, 6–1
Loss	2016	Australian Open	Hard	(Netherlands) Aniek van Koot	(Netherlands) Marjolein Buis (Japan) Yui Kamiji	2–6, 2–6
Loss	2016	French Open	Clay	(Netherlands) Aniek van Koot	(Japan) Yui Kamiji (United Kingdom) Jordanne Whiley	4–6, 6–4, [6–10]
Loss	2016	Wimbledon	Grass	(Netherlands) Aniek van Koot	(Japan) Yui Kamiji (United Kingdom) Jordanne Whiley	2–6, 2–6
Win	2017	Australian Open (5)	Hard	(Netherlands) Aniek van Koot	(Netherlands) Diede de Groot (Japan) Yui Kamiji	6–3, 6–2
Loss	2017	French Open	Clay	(Netherlands) Aniek van Koot	(Netherlands) Marjolein Buis (Japan) Yui Kamiji	3–6, 5–7
Win	2023	Wimbledon (3)	Grass	(Netherlands) Diede de Groot	(Japan) Yui Kamiji (South Africa) Kgothatso Montjane	6–1, 6–4
Loss	2023	US Open	Hard	(Netherlands) Diede de Groot	(Japan) Yui Kamiji (South Africa) Kgothatso Montjane	walkover
Win	2024	Australian Open (6)	Hard	(Netherlands) Diede de Groot	(Japan) Yui Kamiji (South Africa) Kgothatso Montjane	6–3, 7–6^{(7–2)}
Loss	2024	Wimbledon	Grass	(Netherlands) Diede de Groot	(Japan) Yui Kamiji (South Africa) Kgothatso Montjane	4–6, 4–6

Awards
Preceded by Florence Gravellier Aniek van Koot	Year End Number 1 – Doubles Award; 2006; 2007–2008 (with Vergeer); 2013	Succeeded by Korie Homan Yui Kamiji
Preceded by Yui Kamiji	ITF Wheelchair Tennis World Champion; 2015, 2016	Succeeded by Yui Kamiji
