= Sakhorn Khanthasit =

Thai wheelchair tennis player

Personal information
- Nationality: Thai

Sport
- Country: Thailand
- Sport: Wheelchair tennis
Medal record
Paralympic Games
Silver medal – second place	2004 Athens	Doubles
Asian Para Games
Bronze medal – third place	2022 Hangzhou	Doubles

Sakhorn Khanthasit is a Thai wheelchair tennis player.

== Career ==
Khanthasit competed at the 2004 Paralympic Games where she won a silver medal in the women's doubles event. She also competed at the 2012 Paralympic Games.
