= Marjolein Buis =

Dutch wheelchair tennis player

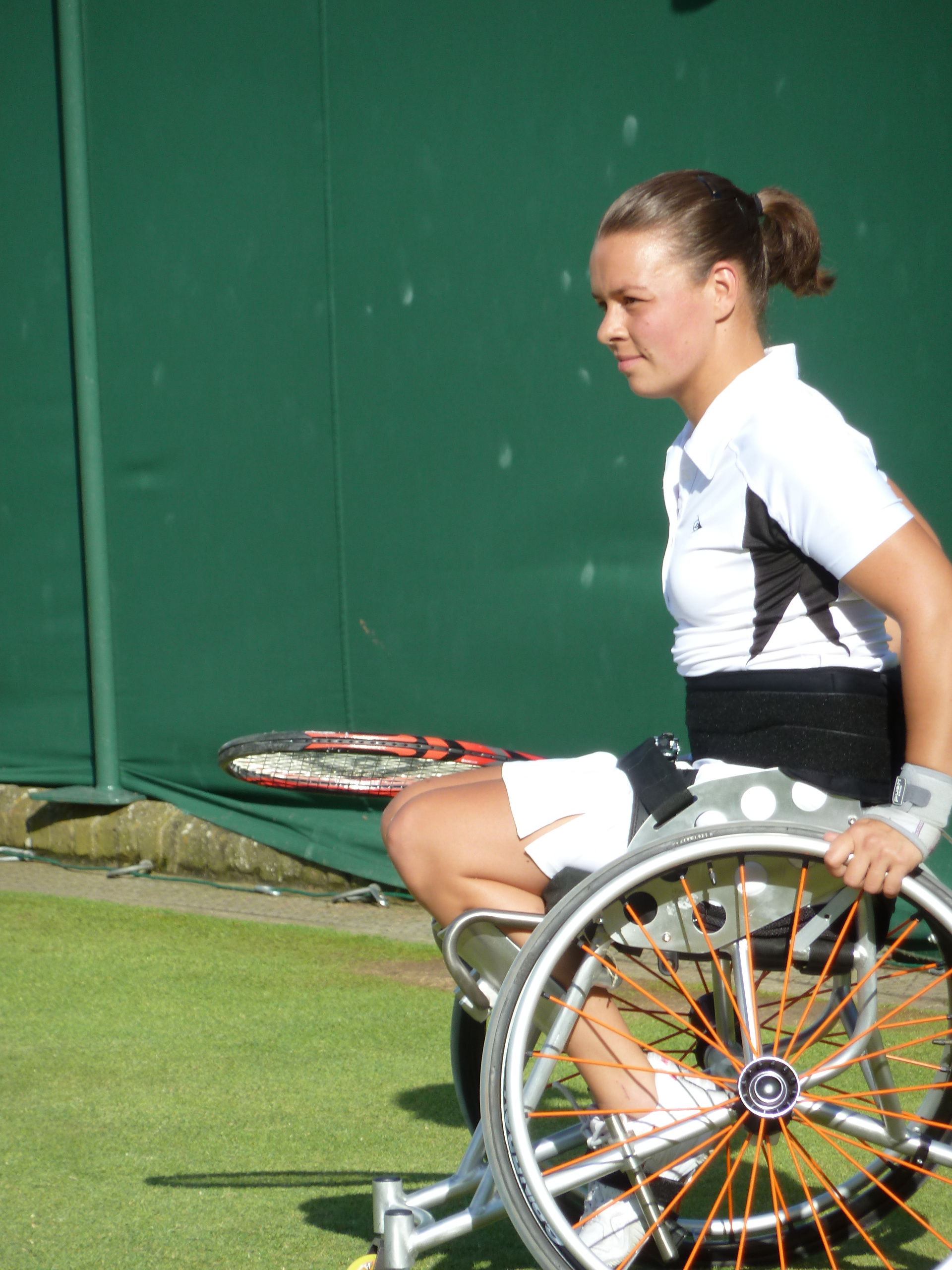
- Buis at Wimbledon during 2012
- Full name: Marjolein Buis
- Country (sports): Netherlands
- Residence: Beuningen
- Born: 11 January 1988 (age 38) Nijmegen, Netherlands
- Turned pro: 2010
- Retired: 2020
- Plays: Right handed
- Coach: Wouter Kropman

Singles
- Career titles: 18
- Highest ranking: No.3 (21 May 2012)
- Current ranking: No.5 (9 July 2018)

Grand Slam singles results
- Australian Open: SF (2011, 2012, 2013, 2016, 2019)
- French Open: W (2016)
- Wimbledon: SF (2016)
- US Open: SF (2013, 2014, 2017, 2019, 2020)

Other tournaments
- Masters: 3rd (2013)
- Paralympic Games: QF (2012)

Doubles
- Career titles: 52
- Highest ranking: No. 1 (2012)
- Current ranking: No.2 (9 July 2018)

Grand Slam doubles results
- Australian Open: W (2016, 2018)
- French Open: W (2012)
- Wimbledon: F (2017)
- US Open: W (2017)

Other doubles tournaments
- Masters Doubles: W (2017, 2018)
- Paralympic Games: Gold Medal (2012), Silver Medal (2016)

Marjolein Buis (born 11 January 1988) is a Dutch retired wheelchair tennis player. Buis won 18 singles titles and 52 doubles titles. She won the gold medal in the women's doubles event with Esther Vergeer along with six grand slam doubles and two masters titles. In 2016 Buis won her only grand slam singles title at the French Open. Buis had a career high ranking of No. 3 in singles and No. 1 in doubles.

Marjolein Buis was born in Nijmegen, the Netherlands. At the age of 14 she started to experience problems when walking. It turned out that she has a connective tissue disorder, the Ehlers–Danlos syndrome, which affects the stability of the joints. This left her unable to play able bodied sports. At the age of 17, Buis discovered wheelchair tennis. In 2010, she graduated in Social Work and became a full-time tennis player. She qualified for the Paralympic Games in London 2012 and reached the quarterfinal in singles and won gold in doubles with her partner Esther Vergeer. At the Paralympic Games in Rio 2016 Buis reached the quarterfinal in singles again and this time won silver in doubles with her partner Diede de Groot. Buis was a full-time player.

== Wheelchair Grand Slam finals ==
=== Singles: 1 (1 title) ===
Outcome	Year	Championship	Surface	Opponent	Score
Winner	2016	French Open	Clay	(Germany) Sabine Ellerbrock	6–3, 6–4
