= Lola Ochoa =

Spanish wheelchair tennis player

Personal information
- Full name: Maria Dolores Ochoa Ribes
- Nickname: Lola
- Nationality: Spanish
- Born: 4 October 1978 (age 47) Valencia, Spain

Sport
- Country: Spain
- Sport: Wheelchair tennis

Maria Dolores "Lola" Ochoa Ribes (born 4 October 1978) is a Spanish wheelchair tennis player. A paraplegic as a result of an accident when she was 14, she picked up tennis as a wheelchair player following it. She has gone on to represent Spain at the 2004 Summer Paralympics, 2008 Summer Paralympics and 2012 Summer Paralympics, and the 2013 World Championships. In 2013, she was ranked 61st in the world.

== Personal ==
Ochoa was born on 4 October 1978 in Valencia. She has paraplegia as a result of an accident when she was 14 years old. She has an undergraduate degree in business management from a Spanish university. In 2004, she lived in Valencia and was working as a financial manager. In August 2012, she attended a conference organised by Groupama Seguro in Madrid. The group was one of the main sponsors for the Spanish Paralympic Committee in the lead up to the 2012 Summer Paralympics. Alongside several other Paralympians, she presented on athlete preparations for the Games. In 2013, she was working for SabadellCAM.

== Wheelchair tennis ==
Ochoa took up wheelchair tennis when she was a 16-year-old. She originally chose tennis as a young girl because relatives were involved in it on an amateur level. Following the accident, she looked at the sport more seriously after connecting with the Federation of Adapted Sports Valencia. When she first started playing, she used her everyday chair to play wheelchair tennis. It lacked maneuverability and was not always easy to handle. At times, she also had problems finding facilities where she could play. While the situation has improved for her because of improvements in Spain, she does not have the same type of access that players from the United States, Japan and the Netherlands have. By 2013, there is greater acceptance of and normalization of the idea that she belongs on the court.

Ochoa has belonged to the Avant tennis club, and has been sponsored by PlusUltra and Groupama Insurance. She is a right handed player.

In the IWTF 1998 year end rankings, Ochoa was 55th in the women's singles. In the IWTF 1999 year end rankings, she was 40th in the women's singles and 38th in the doubles. In the IWTF 2000 year end rankings, she was 37th in the women's singles and 93rd in the doubles. In the IWTF 2002 year end rankings, she was 53rd in the women's singles. In the IWTF 2003 year end rankings, she was 29th in the women's singles and 42nd in the doubles.

Ochoa competed at the 2004 Summer Paralympics in Athens, Greece. She was able to qualify for the Games because of changes to the selection process. Qualification was based on IWTF rankings as opposed to having spots available on a by country level where she had to compete against Spanish men and other women for a spot on the Spanish team. She went out in the singles competition in the round of 32 against Japanese player Chiyoko Ohmae with scores of 2–6 and 1–6. Playing with Barbara Vidal in the doubles, they lost to a pair from Switzerland by scores of 3–6 and 0–6. Following the Athens Games, she dedicated herself more fully to the game.

Ochoa competed at the 2008 Summer Paralympics. She lost to Sharon Walraven of the Netherlands in the round of 32 by 2–6 and 1–6. Following the Beijing Games, she took a brief break from the sport to reflect on life.

In 2010, she had surgery in June and November that hindered her ability to compete. Her performance during the 2011 season was such that for a time, she was the third ranked female player domestically in Spain. She finished out the 2011 Spanish season as the Spanish women's champion. In April 2012, she was ranked 14th in the world in women's singles. In June 2012, she was ranked 17th in the world in doubles.

She competed at the 2012 Summer Paralympics. She lost to Kgothatso Montjane 7–5 and 6–2 in the round of 32. At the time, Montjane was ranked tenth in the world.

Turkey hosted the 2013 World Championships in which Ribes was one of five members of the Spanish team. Prior to the start of the competition, she was ranked second in Spain and 61st internationally. In 2013, she was hoping she could qualify for the 2016 Summer Paralympics in Rio. In 2013, she had 16 singles wins and 6 losses. She had 12 doubles wins in 2013 and 6 doubles losses. As of December 2013, she has 164 career singles wins and 87 career losses. In doubles play, 90 career wins and 72 career losses.
