= 2016 Reinert Open =

- Date: 4–10 July
- Edition: 9th
- Category: ITF Women's Circuit
- Prize money: $50,000
- Surface: Clay
- Location: Versmold, Germany

Champions

Singles
- (Germany) Antonia Lottner

Doubles
- (Russia) Natela Dzalamidze / (Ukraine) Valeriya Strakhova
← 2015 ·	Reinert Open	· 2017 →

The 2016 Reinert Open was a professional tennis tournament played on outdoor clay courts. It was the ninth edition of the tournament and part of the 2016 ITF Women's Circuit, offering a total of $50,000 in prize money. It took place in Versmold, Germany, on 4–10 July 2016.

== Singles main draw entrants ==
=== Seeds ===
Country	Player	Rank^{1}	Seed
SVK	Anna Karolína Schmiedlová	40	1
ROU	Sorana Cîrstea	85	2
RUS	Irina Khromacheva	122	3
NED	Richèl Hogenkamp	135	4
FRA	Alizé Lim	156	5
TUR	İpek Soylu	161	6
BUL	Isabella Shinikova	173	7
NED	Lesley Kerkhove	176	8

- ^{1} Rankings as of 27 June 2016.

=== Other entrants ===
The following player received a wildcard into the singles main draw:

- (Romania) Sorana Cîrstea
- (Germany) Katharina Gerlach
- (Germany) Katharina Hobgarski
- (Germany) Julia Wachaczyk

The following players received entry from the qualifying draw:

- (Venezuela) Andrea Gámiz
- (Germany) Yana Morderger
- (Germany) Laura Schaeder
- (Bulgaria) Julia Terziyska

The following player received entry by a lucky loser spot:

- (Germany) Anna Klasen

== Champions ==
=== Singles ===
- (Germany) Antonia Lottner def. (Czech Republic) Tereza Smitková, 3–6, 7–5, 6–3

=== Doubles ===
- (Russia) Natela Dzalamidze / (Ukraine) Valeriya Strakhova def. (Japan) Kanae Hisami / (Japan) Kotomi Takahata, 6–2, 6–1
