= 2017 Reinert Open – Singles =

Singles
- 2017 Reinert Open

Final
- Champion: (Romania) Mihaela Buzărnescu
- Runner-up: (Austria) Barbara Haas
- Score: 6–0, 6–2

Events
Singles	Doubles
← 2016 ·	Reinert Open	· 2018 →

Antonia Lottner was the defending champion, but withdrew before the tournament started.

Mihaela Buzărnescu won the title, defeating Barbara Haas in the final, 6–0, 6–2.

== Seeds ==
1. (Netherlands) Richèl Hogenkamp (second round)
2. (Uzbekistan) Sabina Sharipova (quarterfinals)
3. (Germany) Antonia Lottner (withdrew)
4. (Netherlands) Arantxa Rus (second round)
5. (Czech Republic) Tereza Smitková (first round)
6. (Sweden) Rebecca Peterson (quarterfinals)
7. (Turkey) İpek Soylu (second round)
8. (Austria) Barbara Haas (final)
9. (North Macedonia) Lina Gjorcheska (withdrew)

== Draw ==
=== Key ===
- Q = Qualifier
- WC = Wild card
- LL = Lucky loser
- Alt = Alternate
- SE = Special exempt
- PR = Protected ranking
- ITF = ITF entry
- JE = Junior exempt
- w/o = Walkover
- r = Retired
- d = Defaulted
- SR = Special ranking

=== Finals ===
Semifinals
8	(Austria) Barbara Haas	6	2	7
(Netherlands) Bibiane Schoofs	1	6	5
(Romania) Mihaela Buzărnescu	6	6
Q	(Czech Republic) Anastasia Zarycká	2	3

Final
8	(Austria) Barbara Haas	0	2
(Romania) Mihaela Buzărnescu	6	6

=== Top half ===
First round
1	(Netherlands) R Hogenkamp	6	6
WC	(Germany) F Kommer	4	1
(Spain) O Sáez Larra	5	4
Q	(Belgium) K Zimmermann	7	6
(Switzerland) P Schnyder	6	6
Q	(Belarus) S Pirazhenka	0	1
LL	(Romania) L-I Andrei	6	1	5
8	(Austria) B Haas	4	6	7
LL	(Czech Republic) M Kolodziejová	3	3
(Norway) U Eikeri	6	6
(Japan) A Omae	3	0
(Netherlands) B Schoofs	6	6
Q	(Germany) V Heisen	2	2
(Germany) L Schaeder	6	6
LL	(Egypt) S Samir	6	6^{0}	5
7	(Turkey) İ Soylu	2	7^{7}	7

Second round
1	(Netherlands) R Hogenkamp	6	3	3
Q	(Belgium) K Zimmermann	3	6	6
(Switzerland) P Schnyder	3	5
8	(Austria) B Haas	6	7
(Norway) U Eikeri	6	2	0
(Netherlands) B Schoofs	4	6	6
(Germany) L Schaeder	0	6	6
7	(Turkey) İ Soylu	6	3	2

Quarterfinals
Q	(Belgium) K Zimmermann	3	6	0
8	(Austria) B Haas	6	1	6
(Netherlands) B Schoofs	6	6
(Germany) L Schaeder	4	2

Semifinals
8	(Austria) B Haas	6	2	7
(Netherlands) B Schoofs	1	6	5

=== Bottom half ===
First round
6	(Sweden) R Peterson	6	6
(Russia) P Monova	2	4
(Germany) K Hobgarski	6	6
WC	(Germany) L Puppendahl	0	1
(Israel) J Glushko	5	0^{r}
(Romania) M Buzărnescu	7	2
(Spain) MT Torró Flor	3	2
4	(Netherlands) A Rus	6	6
5	(Czech Republic) T Smitková	2	1
Q	(Czech Republic) A Zarycká	6	6
WC	(Germany) L Rüffer	4	3
(Russia) V Kamenskaya	6	6
(Czech Republic) K Muchová	6	5	1
(Japan) M Eguchi	4	7	6
WC	(Germany) K Gerlach	6	2	1
2	(Uzbekistan) S Sharipova	3	6	6

Second round
6	(Sweden) R Peterson	6	6
(Germany) K Hobgarski	2	4
(Romania) M Buzărnescu	6	6
4	(Netherlands) A Rus	4	1
Q	(Czech Republic) A Zarycká	3	6	6
(Russia) V Kamenskaya	6	3	4
(Japan) M Eguchi	3	2
2	(Uzbekistan) S Sharipova	6	6

Quarterfinals
6	(Sweden) R Peterson	2	2
(Romania) M Buzărnescu	6	6
Q	(Czech Republic) A Zarycká	4	6	6
2	(Uzbekistan) S Sharipova	6	4	2

Semifinals
(Romania) M Buzărnescu	6	6
Q	(Czech Republic) A Zarycká	2	3
