= 2017 Reinert Open =

- Date: 10–16 July
- Edition: 10th
- Category: ITF Women's Circuit
- Prize money: $60,000
- Surface: Clay
- Location: Versmold, Germany

Champions

Singles
- (Romania) Mihaela Buzărnescu

Doubles
- (Germany) Katharina Gerlach / (Germany) Julia Wachaczyk
← 2016 ·	Reinert Open	· 2018 →

The 2017 Reinert Open was a professional tennis tournament played on outdoor clay courts. It was the tenth edition of the tournament and was part of the 2017 ITF Women's Circuit. It took place in Versmold, Germany, on 10–16 July 2017.

== Singles main draw entrants ==
=== Seeds ===
Country	Player	Rank^{1}	Seed
NED	Richèl Hogenkamp	104	1
UZB	Sabina Sharipova	149	2
~~GER~~	~~Antonia Lottner~~	~~150~~	~~3~~
NED	Arantxa Rus	157	4
CZE	Tereza Smitková	161	5
SWE	Rebecca Peterson	173	6
TUR	İpek Soylu	177	7
AUT	Barbara Haas	179	8
~~MKD~~	~~Lina Gjorcheska~~	~~181~~	~~9~~

- ^{1} Rankings as of 3 July 2017.

=== Other entrants ===
The following players received a wildcard into the singles main draw:

- (Germany) Katharina Gerlach
- (Germany) Franziska Kommer
- (Germany) Linda Puppendahl
- (Germany) Lena Rüffer

The following players received entry from the qualifying draw:

- (Germany) Vivian Heisen
- (Belarus) Sviatlana Pirazhenka
- (Czech Republic) Anastasia Zarycká
- (Belgium) Kimberley Zimmermann

The following players received entry as lucky losers:

- (Romania) Laura-Ioana Andrei
- (Czech Republic) Miriam Kolodziejová
- (Egypt) Sandra Samir

== Champions ==
=== Singles ===
- (Romania) Mihaela Buzărnescu def. (Austria) Barbara Haas, 6–0, 6–2

=== Doubles ===
- (Germany) Katharina Gerlach / (Germany) Julia Wachaczyk def. (Japan) Misa Eguchi / (Japan) Akiko Omae, 4–6, 6–1, [10–7]
