= 2019 Reinert Open =

- Date: 8–14 July 2019
- Edition: 12th
- Category: ITF Women's World Tennis Tour
- Prize money: $60,000
- Surface: Clay
- Location: Versmold, Germany

Champions

Singles
- (Serbia) Nina Stojanović

Doubles
- (Russia) Amina Anshba / (Czech Republic) Anastasia Dețiuc
← 2018 ·	Reinert Open	· 2021 →

The 2019 Reinert Open was a professional tennis tournament played on outdoor clay courts. It was the twelfth edition of the tournament which was part of the 2019 ITF Women's World Tennis Tour. It took place in Versmold, Germany between 8 and 14 July 2019.

== Singles main-draw entrants ==
=== Seeds ===
Country	Player	Rank^{1}	Seed
NED	Bibiane Schoofs	158	1
AUT	Barbara Haas	160	2
NED	Richèl Hogenkamp	164	3
IND	Ankita Raina	171	4
BUL	Viktoriya Tomova	177	5
HUN	Anna Bondár	185	6
ROU	Irina Bara	188	7
GRE	Valentini Grammatikopoulou	193	8

- ^{1} Rankings are as of 1 July 2019.

=== Other entrants ===
The following players received wildcards into the singles main draw:

- (Germany) Katharina Gerlach
- (Germany) Jule Niemeier
- (Germany) Julyette Steur
- (Germany) Julia Wachaczyk

The following players received entry from the qualifying draw:

- (Russia) Amina Anshba
- (Romania) Nicoleta Dascălu
- (Czech Republic) Anastasia Dețiuc
- (Italy) Cristiana Ferrando
- (Russia) Ekaterina Makarova
- (Brazil) Teliana Pereira
- (United States) Chiara Scholl
- (Ukraine) Anastasiya Shoshyna

== Champions ==
=== Singles ===
- (Serbia) Nina Stojanović def. (Germany) Katharina Hobgarski, 6–0, 7–5

=== Doubles ===
- (Russia) Amina Anshba / (Czech Republic) Anastasia Dețiuc def. (India) Ankita Raina / (Netherlands) Bibiane Schoofs, 0–6, 6–3, [10–8]
