= 2019 Reinert Open – Singles =

Singles
- 2019 Reinert Open

Final
- Champion: (Serbia) Nina Stojanović
- Runner-up: (Germany) Katharina Hobgarski
- Score: 6–0, 7–5

Events
Singles	Doubles
← 2018 ·	Reinert Open	· 2021 →

Olga Danilović was the defending champion, but chose not to participate.

Nina Stojanović won the title, defeating Katharina Hobgarski in the final, 6–0, 7–5.

== Seeds ==
1. (Netherlands) Bibiane Schoofs (semifinals)
2. (Austria) Barbara Haas (first round)
3. (Netherlands) Richèl Hogenkamp (first round)
4. (India) Ankita Raina (second round)
5. (Bulgaria) Viktoriya Tomova (first round)
6. (Hungary) Anna Bondár (second round)
7. (Romania) Irina Bara (quarterfinals)
8. (Greece) Valentini Grammatikopoulou (second round)

== Draw ==
=== Key ===
- Q = Qualifier
- WC = Wild card
- LL = Lucky loser
- Alt = Alternate
- SE = Special exempt
- PR = Protected ranking
- ITF = ITF entry
- JE = Junior exempt
- w/o = Walkover
- r = Retired
- d = Defaulted
- SR = Special ranking

=== Finals ===
Semifinals
1	(Netherlands) Bibiane Schoofs	2	5
(Germany) Katharina Hobgarski	6	7
(Serbia) Nina Stojanović	6	6
WC	(Germany) Jule Niemeier	4	3

Final
(Germany) Katharina Hobgarski	0	5
(Serbia) Nina Stojanović	6	7

=== Top half ===
First round
1	(Netherlands) B Schoofs	4	6	7
(Italy) M Di Giuseppe	6	3	5
(Australia) J Fourlis	6^{5}	6	4
(Belgium) M Benoît	7^{7}	1	6
WC	(Germany) J Wachaczyk	1	2
(Czech Republic) L Hradecká	6	6
Q	(United States) C Scholl	5	6^{7}
6	(Hungary) A Bondár	7	7^{9}
4	(India) A Raina	6	7^{7}
(Serbia) N Kostić	1	6^{1}
(Germany) K Hobgarski	2	7^{11}	6
(Liechtenstein) K von Deichmann	6	6^{9}	3
Q	(Romania) N Dascălu	5	4
(United States) L Chirico	7	6
Q	(Ukraine) A Shoshyna	2	2
8	(Greece) V Grammatikopoulou	6	6

Second round
1	(Netherlands) B Schoofs	7^{7}	6
(Belgium) M Benoît	6^{2}	3
(Czech Republic) L Hradecká	3	6	6
6	(Hungary) A Bondár	6	3	2
4	(India) A Raina	3	1
(Germany) K Hobgarski	6	6
(United States) L Chirico	6	2	7^{7}
8	(Greece) V Grammatikopoulou	4	6	6^{3}

Quarterfinals
1	(Netherlands) B Schoofs	7	4	6
(Czech Republic) L Hradecká	5	6	2
(Germany) K Hobgarski	3	6	6
(United States) L Chirico	6	4	2

Semifinals
1	(Netherlands) B Schoofs	2	5
(Germany) K Hobgarski	6	7

=== Bottom half ===
First round
5	(Bulgaria) V Tomova	4	6	4
Q	(Brazil) T Pereira	6	3	6
(Belarus) O Govortsova	6	6
Q	(Russia) A Anshba	2	4
(Germany) S Wagner	6	0	4
(Serbia) N Stojanović	3	6	6
Q	(Italy) C Ferrando	6	6
3	(Netherlands) R Hogenkamp	4	2
7	(Romania) I Bara	6	6
Q	(Russia) E Makarova	2	4
WC	(Germany) K Gerlach	3	5
(Bulgaria) E Kostova	6	7
WC	(Germany) J Niemeier	7	6
Q	(Czech Republic) A Dețiuc	5	0
WC	(Germany) J Steur	7^{7}	7^{7}
2	(Austria) B Haas	6^{5}	6^{3}

Second round
Q	(Brazil) T Pereira	6	6
(Belarus) O Govortsova	2	4
(Serbia) N Stojanović	6	6
Q	(Italy) C Ferrando	2	1
7	(Romania) I Bara	4	6	6
(Bulgaria) E Kostova	6	3	0
WC	(Germany) J Niemeier	6	0^{r}
WC	(Germany) J Steur	3	0

Quarterfinals
Q	(Brazil) T Pereira	1	4
(Serbia) N Stojanović	6	6
7	(Romania) I Bara	2	3
WC	(Germany) J Niemeier	6	6

Semifinals
(Serbia) N Stojanović	6	6
WC	(Germany) J Niemeier	4	3
