= 2018 Reinert Open – Doubles =

Doubles
- 2018 Reinert Open

Final
- Champions: (Turkey) Pemra Özgen (Greece) Despina Papamichail
- Runners-up: (Serbia) Olga Danilović (Serbia) Nina Stojanović
- Score: 1–6, 6–2, [10–4]

Events
Singles	Doubles
← 2017 ·	Reinert Open	· 2019 →

Katharina Gerlach and Julia Wachaczyk were the defending champions, but they lost to Amina Anshba and Albina Khabibulina in the quarterfinals.

Pemra Özgen and Despina Papamichail won the title, defeating Olga Danilović and Nina Stojanović in the final, 1–6, 6–2, [10–4].

== Seeds ==
1. (Germany) Katharina Gerlach / (Germany) Julia Wachaczyk (quarterfinals)
2. (Chile) Daniela Seguel / (Spain) Sílvia Soler Espinosa (first round, withdrew)
3. (Ukraine) Valeriya Strakhova / (Belgium) Kimberley Zimmermann (first round)
4. (Finland) Emma Laine / (United States) Chiara Scholl (semifinals)

== Draw ==
=== Key ===
- Q = Qualifier
- WC = Wild card
- LL = Lucky loser
- Alt = Alternate
- SE = Special exempt
- PR = Protected ranking
- ITF = ITF entry
- JE = Junior exempt
- w/o = Walkover
- r = Retired
- d = Defaulted
- SR = Special ranking

=== Draw ===
First round
1	(Germany) K Gerlach (Germany) J Wachaczyk	6	6
(Germany) L Puppendahl (Germany) A Rosnowska	0	1
(Bosnia and Herzegovina) A Husarić (Czech Republic) T Smitková	3	6^{4}
(Russia) A Anshba (Uzbekistan) A Khabibulina	6	7^{7}
3	(Ukraine) V Strakhova (Belgium) K Zimmermann	3	3
(Serbia) O Danilović (Serbia) N Stojanović	6	6
(Germany) A Gabric (Germany) J Niemeier	w/o
(Italy) A Grymalska (Italy) A Moratelli
(Netherlands) R Hogenkamp (Czech Republic) K Muchová	w/o
(Germany) L Rüffer (Croatia) A Vrljić
(Czech Republic) A Dețiuc (Ukraine) O Ianchuk	3	3
4	(Finland) E Laine (United States) C Scholl	6	6
(Brazil) C Alves (Croatia) I Primorac	3	3
(Turkey) P Özgen (Greece) D Papamichail	6	6
(Germany) J Steur (Venezuela) A Uzcátegui	w/o
2	(Chile) D Seguel (Spain) S Soler Espinosa

Quarterfinals
1	(Germany) K Gerlach (Germany) J Wachaczyk	3	3
(Russia) A Anshba (Uzbekistan) A Khabibulina	6	6
(Serbia) O Danilović (Serbia) N Stojanović	6	7
(Germany) A Gabric (Germany) J Niemeier	3	5
(Netherlands) R Hogenkamp (Czech Republic) K Muchová	3	3
4	(Finland) E Laine (United States) C Scholl	6	6
(Turkey) P Özgen (Greece) D Papamichail	6	6
(Germany) J Steur (Venezuela) A Uzcátegui	2	2

Semifinals
(Russia) A Anshba (Uzbekistan) A Khabibulina	2	2
(Serbia) O Danilović (Serbia) N Stojanović	6	6
4	(Finland) E Laine (United States) C Scholl	5	2
(Turkey) P Özgen (Greece) D Papamichail	7	6

Final
(Serbia) O Danilović (Serbia) N Stojanović	6	2	[4]
(Turkey) P Özgen (Greece) D Papamichail	1	6	[10]
