= 2018 Reinert Open =

- Date: 9–15 July
- Edition: 11th
- Category: ITF Women's Circuit
- Prize money: $60,000
- Surface: Clay
- Location: Versmold, Germany

Champions

Singles
- (Serbia) Olga Danilović

Doubles
- (Turkey) Pemra Özgen / (Greece) Despina Papamichail
← 2017 ·	Reinert Open	· 2019 →

The 2018 Reinert Open was a professional tennis tournament played on outdoor clay courts. It was the eleventh edition of the tournament and was part of the 2018 ITF Women's Circuit. It took place in Versmold, Germany, on 9–15 July 2018.

== Singles main draw entrants ==
=== Seeds ===
Country	Player	Rank^{1}	Seed
GER	Carina Witthöft	81	1
NED	Richèl Hogenkamp	161	2
CZE	Tereza Martincová	163	3
CZE	Tereza Smitková	168	4
LIE	Kathinka von Deichmann	169	5
NED	Bibiane Schoofs	173	6
BUL	Elitsa Kostova	183	7
TUR	Çağla Büyükakçay	186	8

- ^{1} Rankings as of 2 July 2018.

=== Other entrants ===
The following players received a wildcard into the singles main draw:

- (Germany) Katharina Gerlach
- (Germany) Lena Rüffer
- (Germany) Laura Siegemund
- (Germany) Julyette Steur

The following players received entry from the qualifying draw:

- (Italy) Angelica Moratelli
- (Germany) Jule Niemeier
- (Turkey) Pemra Özgen
- (Poland) Katarzyna Piter

== Champions ==
=== Singles ===
- (Serbia) Olga Danilović def. (Germany) Laura Siegemund, 5–7, 6–1, 6–3

=== Doubles ===
- (Turkey) Pemra Özgen / (Greece) Despina Papamichail def. (Serbia) Olga Danilović / (Serbia) Nina Stojanović, 1–6, 6–2, [10–4]
