= 2016 Reinert Open – Singles =

Singles
- 2016 Reinert Open

Final
- Champion: (Germany) Antonia Lottner
- Runner-up: (Czech Republic) Tereza Smitková
- Score: 3–6, 7–5, 6–3

Events
Singles	Doubles
← 2015 ·	Reinert Open	· 2017 →

Carina Witthöft was the defending champion, but chose not to participate.

Antonia Lottner won the title, defeating Tereza Smitková in the final, 3–6, 7–5, 6–3.

== Seeds ==
1. (Slovakia) Anna Karolína Schmiedlová (second round)
2. (Romania) Sorana Cîrstea (semifinals)
3. (Russia) Irina Khromacheva (quarterfinals)
4. (Netherlands) Richèl Hogenkamp (first round)
5. (France) Alizé Lim (first round)
6. (Turkey) İpek Soylu (quarterfinals)
7. (Bulgaria) Isabella Shinikova (second round)
8. (Netherlands) Lesley Kerkhove (quarterfinals)

== Main draw ==
=== Key ===
- Q = Qualifier
- WC = Wild card
- LL = Lucky loser
- Alt = Alternate
- SE = Special exempt
- PR = Protected ranking
- ITF = ITF entry
- JE = Junior exempt
- w/o = Walkover
- r = Retired
- d = Defaulted
- SR = Special ranking

=== Finals ===
Semifinals
(Czech Republic) Karolína Muchová	5	1
(Czech Republic) Tereza Smitková	7	6
(Germany) Antonia Lottner	1	7	6
2/WC	(Romania) Sorana Cîrstea	6	5	3

Final
(Czech Republic) Tereza Smitková	6	5	3
(Germany) Antonia Lottner	3	7	6

=== Top half ===
First round
1	(Slovakia) AK Schmiedlová	2	6	6
(Netherlands) A Rus	6	3	3
(Serbia) N Stojanović	6	6
(Turkey) P Özgen	4	3
Q	(Bulgaria) J Terziyska	4	5
(Russia) N Dzalamidze	6	7
(Czech Republic) K Muchová	7	6
5	(France) A Lim	5	4
3	(Russia) I Khromacheva	6	6
(Russia) M Melnikova	3	2
(Ukraine) V Strakhova	6	6
WC	(Germany) K Gerlach	4	3
(Czech Republic) T Smitková	6	6
(India) A Raina	3	3
(China) J Lu	3	4
7	(Bulgaria) I Shinikova	6	6

Second round
1	(Slovakia) AK Schmiedlová	6	5	4
(Serbia) N Stojanović	1	7	6
(Russia) N Dzalamidze	7^{7}	3	0
(Czech Republic) K Muchová	6^{3}	6	6
3	(Russia) I Khromacheva	3	6	7
(Ukraine) V Strakhova	6	1	5
(Czech Republic) T Smitková	6	6
7	(Bulgaria) I Shinikova	3	4

Quarterfinals
(Serbia) N Stojanović	3	1
(Czech Republic) K Muchová	6	6
3	(Russia) I Khromacheva	4	2
(Czech Republic) T Smitková	6	6

Semifinals
(Czech Republic) K Muchová	5	1
(Czech Republic) T Smitková	7	6

=== Bottom half ===
First round
6	(Turkey) İ Soylu	7	6
Q	(Germany) L Schaeder	5	4
(Israel) D Khazaniuk	4	2
Q	(Germany) Y Morderger	6	6
(Germany) A Lottner	6	6
(Croatia) A Vrljić	2	0
WC	(Germany) J Wachaczyk	6	3	6
4	(Netherlands) R Hogenkamp	1	6	4
8	(Netherlands) L Kerkhove	2	6	7^{7}
(Germany) A Schäfer	6	3	6^{5}
LL	(Germany) A Klasen	2	1
(Russia) V Ivakhnenko	6	6
WC	(Germany) K Hobgarski	3	5
(Argentina) N Podoroska	6	7
Q	(Venezuela) A Gámiz	2	6^{4}
2/WC	(Romania) S Cîrstea	6	7^{7}

Second round
6	(Turkey) İ Soylu	6	6
Q	(Germany) Y Morderger	2	1
(Germany) A Lottner	7^{8}	6
WC	(Germany) J Wachaczyk	6^{6}	2
8	(Netherlands) L Kerkhove	6	7^{7}
(Russia) V Ivakhnenko	3	6^{3}
(Argentina) N Podoroska	2	6	5
2/WC	(Romania) S Cîrstea	6	1	7

Quarterfinals
6	(Turkey) İ Soylu	6	4	3
(Germany) A Lottner	4	6	6
8	(Netherlands) L Kerkhove	6^{6}	3
2/WC	(Romania) S Cîrstea	7^{8}	6

Semifinals
(Germany) A Lottner	1	7	6
2/WC	(Romania) S Cîrstea	6	5	3
