= 2016 Reinert Open – Doubles =

Doubles
- 2016 Reinert Open

Final
- Champions: (Russia) Natela Dzalamidze (Ukraine) Valeriya Strakhova
- Runners-up: (Japan) Kanae Hisami (Japan) Kotomi Takahata
- Score: 6–2, 6–1

Events
Singles	Doubles
← 2015 ·	Reinert Open	· 2017 →

Eva Hrdinová and Shahar Pe'er were the defending champions, but chose not to participate.

Natela Dzalamidze and Valeriya Strakhova won the title, defeating Kanae Hisami and Kotomi Takahata in the final, 6–2, 6–1.

== Seeds ==
1. (Japan) Kanae Hisami / (Japan) Kotomi Takahata (final)
2. (Russia) Natela Dzalamidze / (Ukraine) Valeriya Strakhova (champions)
3. (Venezuela) Andrea Gámiz / (Serbia) Nina Stojanović (first round)
4. (Germany) Antonia Lottner / (Germany) Anne Schäfer (first round)

== Draw ==
=== Key ===
- Q = Qualifier
- WC = Wild card
- LL = Lucky loser
- Alt = Alternate
- SE = Special exempt
- PR = Protected ranking
- ITF = ITF entry
- JE = Junior exempt
- w/o = Walkover
- r = Retired
- d = Defaulted
- SR = Special ranking

First round
1	(Japan) K Hisami (Japan) K Takahata	6	6
(China) J Lu (Croatia) A Vrljić	3	3
WC	(Germany) F Kommer (Argentina) N Podoroska	6	3	[9]
(Slovenia) N Kolar (Bosnia and Herzegovina) J Tinjić	1	6	[11]
4	(Germany) A Lottner (Germany) A Schäfer	5	6	[4]
(Germany) A Klasen (Austria) S Klemenschits	7	2	[10]
(Germany) T Morderger (Germany) Y Morderger	6	6
(Germany) N Geuer (Argentina) G Pérez Rojas	4	3
(Belgium) S Distelmans (Netherlands) K Versteeg	3	7^{8}	[5]
(Germany) L Rüffer (Germany) L Schaeder	6	6^{6}	[10]
(Germany) K Hobgarski (Germany) J Wachaczyk	6	6
3	(Venezuela) A Gámiz (Serbia) N Stojanović	4	3
(Bulgaria) I Shinikova (Bulgaria) J Terziyska	6	6
(Netherlands) R Hogenkamp (Netherlands) L Kerkhove	3	3
(India) A Raina (United Kingdom) F Stephenson	3	4
2	(Russia) N Dzalamidze (Ukraine) V Strakhova	6	6

Quarterfinals
1	(Japan) K Hisami (Japan) K Takahata	7^{9}	6
(Slovenia) N Kolar (Bosnia and Herzegovina) J Tinjić	6^{7}	3
(Germany) A Klasen (Austria) S Klemenschits	3	7^{7}	[2]
(Germany) T Morderger (Germany) Y Morderger	6	6^{5}	[10]
(Germany) L Rüffer (Germany) L Schaeder	1	3
(Germany) K Hobgarski (Germany) J Wachaczyk	6	6
(Bulgaria) I Shinikova (Bulgaria) J Terziyska	4	7^{8}	[5]
2	(Russia) N Dzalamidze (Ukraine) V Strakhova	6	6^{6}	[10]

Semifinals
1	(Japan) K Hisami (Japan) K Takahata	6	6
(Germany) T Morderger (Germany) Y Morderger	2	0
(Germany) K Hobgarski (Germany) J Wachaczyk	5	2
2	(Russia) N Dzalamidze (Ukraine) V Strakhova	7	6

Final
1	(Japan) K Hisami (Japan) K Takahata	2	1
2	(Russia) N Dzalamidze (Ukraine) V Strakhova	6	6
