= 2018 Reinert Open – Singles =

Singles
- 2018 Reinert Open

Final
- Champion: (Serbia) Olga Danilović
- Runner-up: (Germany) Laura Siegemund
- Score: 5–7, 6–1, 6–3

Events
Singles	Doubles
← 2017 ·	Reinert Open	· 2019 →

Mihaela Buzărnescu was the defending champion, but chose not to participate.

Olga Danilović won the title, defeating Laura Siegemund in the final, 5–7, 6–1, 6–3.

== Seeds ==
1. (Germany) Carina Witthöft (quarterfinals)
2. (Netherlands) Richèl Hogenkamp (first round)
3. (Czech Republic) Tereza Martincová (second round)
4. (Czech Republic) Tereza Smitková (first round)
5. (Liechtenstein) Kathinka von Deichmann (quarterfinals)
6. (Netherlands) Bibiane Schoofs (semifinals)
7. (Bulgaria) Elitsa Kostova (first round)
8. (Turkey) Çağla Büyükakçay (quarterfinals)

== Draw ==
=== Key ===
- Q = Qualifier
- WC = Wild card
- LL = Lucky loser
- Alt = Alternate
- SE = Special exempt
- PR = Protected ranking
- ITF = ITF entry
- JE = Junior exempt
- w/o = Walkover
- r = Retired
- d = Defaulted
- SR = Special ranking

=== Finals ===
Semifinals
WC	(Germany) Laura Siegemund	4	7	6
(Germany) Anna Zaja	6	5	4
6	(Netherlands) Bibiane Schoofs	1	3
(Serbia) Olga Danilović	6	6

Final
WC	(Germany) Laura Siegemund	7	1	3
(Serbia) Olga Danilović	5	6	6

=== Top half ===
First round
1	(Germany) C Witthöft	6	4	6
(Norway) U Eikeri	3	6	3
(Spain) S Soler Espinosa	7	6
WC	(Germany) J Steur	5	2
(Romania) J Cristian	4	1
(Czech Republic) K Muchová	6	6
WC	(Germany) L Siegemund	6	6
7	(Bulgaria) E Kostova	2	4
3	(Czech Republic) T Martincová	6^{4}	6	4
(Chile) D Seguel	7^{7}	4	0^{r}
Q	(Italy) A Moratelli	1	3
(Germany) A Zaja	6	6
WC	(Germany) L Rüffer	6	5	6
(Ukraine) O Ianchuk	1	7	4
WC	(Germany) K Gerlach	6	4	5
8	(Turkey) Ç Büyükakçay	2	6	7

Second round
1	(Germany) C Witthöft	3	7	7
(Spain) S Soler Espinosa	6	5	5
(Czech Republic) K Muchová	7	2	4
WC	(Germany) L Siegemund	5	6	6
3	(Czech Republic) T Martincová	2	6	2
(Germany) A Zaja	6	4	6
WC	(Germany) L Rüffer	3	3
8	(Turkey) Ç Büyükakçay	6	6

Quarterfinals
1	(Germany) C Witthöft	1	3
WC	(Germany) L Siegemund	6	6
(Germany) A Zaja	6	6
8	(Turkey) Ç Büyükakçay	2	3

Semifinals
WC	(Germany) L Siegemund	4	7	6
(Germany) A Zaja	6	5	4

=== Bottom half ===
First round
6	(Netherlands) B Schoofs	6	6
Q	(Germany) J Niemeier	4	2
Q	(Poland) K Piter	6	6
(United States) C Scholl	3	1
(Italy) M Di Giuseppe	6	6
Q	(Turkey) P Özgen	3	2
(Russia) A Potapova	6	4	7^{7}
4	(Czech Republic) T Smitková	4	6	6^{5}
5	(Liechtenstein) K von Deichmann	6	7^{7}
(Serbia) D Radanović	2	6^{2}
(Italy) A Grymalska	6^{5}	6	6
(Serbia) N Stojanović	7^{7}	4	4
(Turkey) İ Soylu	2	4
(Italy) J Pieri	6	6
(Serbia) O Danilović	7^{7}	6
2	(Netherlands) R Hogenkamp	6^{5}	0

Second round
6	(Netherlands) B Schoofs	7	6
Q	(Poland) K Piter	5	2
(Italy) M Di Giuseppe	6	1	7^{7}
(Russia) A Potapova	4	6	6^{5}
5	(Liechtenstein) K von Deichmann	6	7^{7}
(Italy) A Grymalska	2	6^{5}
(Italy) J Pieri	1	1
(Serbia) O Danilović	6	6

Quarterfinals
6	(Netherlands) B Schoofs	6	4	6
(Italy) M Di Giuseppe	4	6	1
5	(Liechtenstein) K von Deichmann	2	5
(Serbia) O Danilović	6	7

Semifinals
6	(Netherlands) B Schoofs	1	3
(Serbia) O Danilović	6	6
