= 2019 Reinert Open – Doubles =

Doubles
- 2019 Reinert Open

Final
- Champions: (Russia) Amina Anshba (Czech Republic) Anastasia Dețiuc
- Runners-up: (India) Ankita Raina (Netherlands) Bibiane Schoofs
- Score: 0–6, 6–3, [10–8]

Events
Singles	Doubles
← 2018 ·	Reinert Open	· 2021 →

Pemra Özgen and Despina Papamichail were the defending champions, but chose not to participate.

Amina Anshba and Anastasia Dețiuc won the title, defeating Ankita Raina and Bibiane Schoofs in the final, 0–6, 6–3, [10–8].

== Seeds ==
1. (India) Ankita Raina / (Netherlands) Bibiane Schoofs (final)
2. (Uzbekistan) Albina Khabibulina / (Germany) Julia Wachaczyk (semifinals)
3. (Russia) Amina Anshba / (Czech Republic) Anastasia Dețiuc (champions)
4. (Serbia) Natalija Kostić / (United States) Chiara Scholl (semifinals)

== Draw ==
=== Key ===
- Q = Qualifier
- WC = Wild card
- LL = Lucky loser
- Alt = Alternate
- SE = Special exempt
- PR = Protected ranking
- ITF = ITF entry
- JE = Junior exempt
- w/o = Walkover
- r = Retired
- d = Defaulted
- SR = Special ranking

=== Draw ===
First round
(Germany) K Gerlach (Kyrgyzstan) K Palkina	2	6	[11]
(Belgium) E Casteleyn (Brazil) T Pereira	6	3	[9]
4	(Serbia) N Kostić (United States) C Scholl	w/o
(Hungary) Á Bukta (Croatia) I Primorac
(Switzerland) L Küng (Germany) E Seibold	6	6
(United Kingdom) A Pitak (United Kingdom) K Pitak	2	3
(Croatia) M Dražić (Germany) A Klasen	3	3
(Czech Republic) M Bayerlová (Russia) E Makarova	6	6
(Germany) Jo Steur (Germany) Ju Steur	6	6^{3}	[3]
(Germany) T Morderger (Germany) Y Morderger	1	7^{7}	[10]

Quarterfinals
1	(India) A Raina (Netherlands) B Schoofs	6	6
(Germany) K Gerlach (Kyrgyzstan) K Palkina	3	4
4	(Serbia) N Kostić (United States) C Scholl	7	6
(Switzerland) L Küng (Germany) E Seibold	5	1
(Czech Republic) M Bayerlová (Russia) E Makarova	6	2	[6]
3	(Russia) A Anshba (Czech Republic) A Dețiuc	1	6	[10]
(Germany) T Morderger (Germany) Y Morderger	2	2
2	(Uzbekistan) A Khabibulina (Germany) J Wachaczyk	6	6

Semifinals
1	(India) A Raina (Netherlands) B Schoofs	6	6
4	(Serbia) N Kostić (United States) C Scholl	2	0
3	(Russia) A Anshba (Czech Republic) A Dețiuc	6	7
2	(Uzbekistan) A Khabibulina (Germany) J Wachaczyk	4	5

Final
1	(India) A Raina (Netherlands) B Schoofs	6	3	[8]
3	(Russia) A Anshba (Czech Republic) A Dețiuc	0	6	[10]
