= 2017 Reinert Open – Doubles =

Doubles
- 2017 Reinert Open

Final
- Champion: (Germany) Katharina Gerlach (Germany) Julia Wachaczyk
- Runner-up: (Japan) Misa Eguchi (Japan) Akiko Omae
- Score: 4–6, 6–1, [10–7]

Events
Singles	Doubles
← 2016 ·	Reinert Open	· 2018 →

Natela Dzalamidze and Valeriya Strakhova were the defending champions, but both players chose not to participate.

Katharina Gerlach and Julia Wachaczyk won the title, defeating Misa Eguchi and Akiko Omae in the final, 4–6, 6–1, [10–7].

== Seeds ==
1. (North Macedonia) Lina Gjorcheska / (Sweden) Cornelia Lister (quarterfinals, withdrew)
2. (Romania) Mihaela Buzărnescu / (Russia) Polina Monova (quarterfinals)
3. (Norway) Ulrikke Eikeri / (United States) Sanaz Marand (quarterfinals)
4. (Japan) Misa Eguchi / (Japan) Akiko Omae (final)

== Draw ==
=== Key ===
- Q = Qualifier
- WC = Wild card
- LL = Lucky loser
- Alt = Alternate
- SE = Special exempt
- PR = Protected ranking
- ITF = ITF entry
- JE = Junior exempt
- w/o = Walkover
- r = Retired
- d = Defaulted
- SR = Special ranking

First round
(Germany) K Gerlach (Germany) J Wachaczyk	6	6
(Germany) T Morderger (Germany) Y Morderger	2	3
(Germany) R Kölzer (Germany) L Rüffer	6	6^{4}	[10]
(Netherlands) A Rus (Netherlands) B Schoofs	1	7^{7}	[7]
(Germany) F Kommer (Egypt) S Samir	3	1
(Romania) L-I Andrei (Germany) K Hering	6	6
(Germany) S Gorovits (Germany) S Weidemann	3	2
(Belarus) S Pirazhenka (Netherlands) E Vogelsang	6	6

Quarterfinals
1	(North Macedonia) L Gjorcheska (Sweden) C Lister
(Germany) K Gerlach (Germany) J Wachaczyk	w/o
3	(Norway) U Eikeri (United States) S Marand	6	4	[6]
(Germany) R Kölzer (Germany) L Rüffer	2	6	[10]
(Romania) L-I Andrei (Germany) K Hering
4	(Japan) M Eguchi (Japan) A Omae	w/o
(Belarus) S Pirazhenka (Netherlands) E Vogelsang	1	7	[10]
2	(Romania) M Buzărnescu (Russia) P Monova	6	5	[8]

Semifinals
(Germany) K Gerlach (Germany) J Wachaczyk	6	3	[13]
(Germany) R Kölzer (Germany) L Rüffer	3	6	[11]
4	(Japan) M Eguchi (Japan) A Omae	6	6
(Belarus) S Pirazhenka (Netherlands) E Vogelsang	2	2

Final
(Germany) K Gerlach (Germany) J Wachaczyk	4	6	[10]
4	(Japan) M Eguchi (Japan) A Omae	6	1	[7]
