= Olga Danilović =

Serbian former tennis player (born 2001)

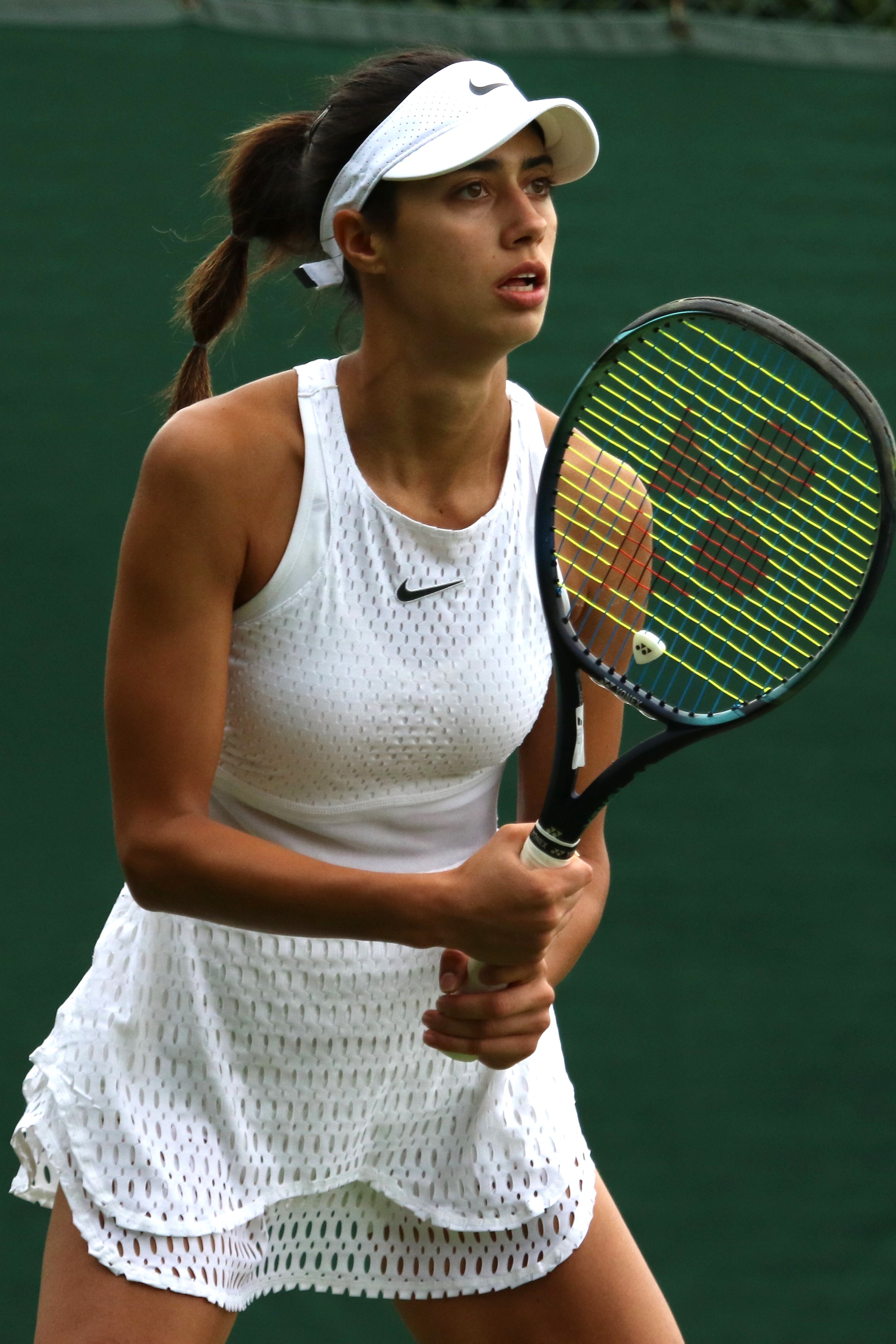
- Danilović at the 2023 Wimbledon Championships
- Native name: Олга Даниловић
- Country (sports): Serbia
- Residence: Belgrade, Serbia
- Born: 23 January 2001 (age 25) Belgrade, FR Yugoslavia
- Height: 1.82 m (6 ft 0 in)
- Plays: Left-handed (two-handed backhand)
- Coach: Alejandro García Cenzano
- Prize money: $2,984,527

Singles
- Career record: 225–137
- Career titles: 2
- Highest ranking: No. 32 (14 July 2025)
- Current ranking: No. 395 (16 November 2026)

Grand Slam singles results
- Australian Open: 4R (2025)
- French Open: 4R (2024)
- Wimbledon: 2R (2025)
- US Open: 2R (2021)

Doubles
- Career record: 55–33
- Career titles: 2
- Highest ranking: No. 82 (2 February 2026)
- Current ranking: No. 504 (16 November 2026)

Grand Slam doubles results
- Australian Open: 2R (2026)
- French Open: QF (2025)

Grand Slam mixed doubles results
- US Open: 1R (2025)

Team competitions
- Fed Cup: 12–8 (singles 7–3)

Olga Danilović (Serbian Cyrillic: Олга Даниловић, pronounced [ôːlɡa danǐːlovitɕ]; born 23 January 2001) is a Serbian inactive tennis player. She has a career-high singles ranking of No. 32 by the WTA, achieved on 14 July 2025, and a best doubles ranking of No. 82, reached on 2 February 2026. Danilović has won two singles titles and two doubles titles on the WTA Tour.

On the WTA Challenger Tour, she has won two singles titles and one doubles title. Additionally, she won seven singles titles and one doubles title on the ITF World Tour. Competing for Serbia in Billie Jean King Cup competition, Danilović holds a win–loss record of 12–8.

== Early life and background ==
Danilović's father is Serbian former basketball player Predrag Danilović, while her mother, Svetlana (née Radošević), is a sports reporter for Radio Television of Serbia. Her parents met at a basketball game in their teens. She has a younger sister, Sonja, and a younger brother, Vuk.

== Juniors ==
As a junior, Danilović posted a win–loss record of 97–33 in singles and 72–24 in doubles, and reached a No. 5 in the combined junior rankings in January 2018.

She won three major doubles titles (each on a different surface) with three different partners – the 2016 French Open with Paula Arias Manjón, 2017 Wimbledon with Kaja Juvan and 2017 US Open with Marta Kostyuk.

=== Grand Slam performance ===
Singles:

- Australian Open: 3R (2017)
- French Open: 2R (2016)
- Wimbledon: 3R (2016)
- US Open: QF (2017)

Doubles:

- Australian Open: 2R (2017)
- French Open: W (2016)
- Wimbledon: W (2017)
- US Open: W (2017)

== Professional ==
=== 2018: Top 100, first WTA Tour titles; Fed Cup Heart Award ===
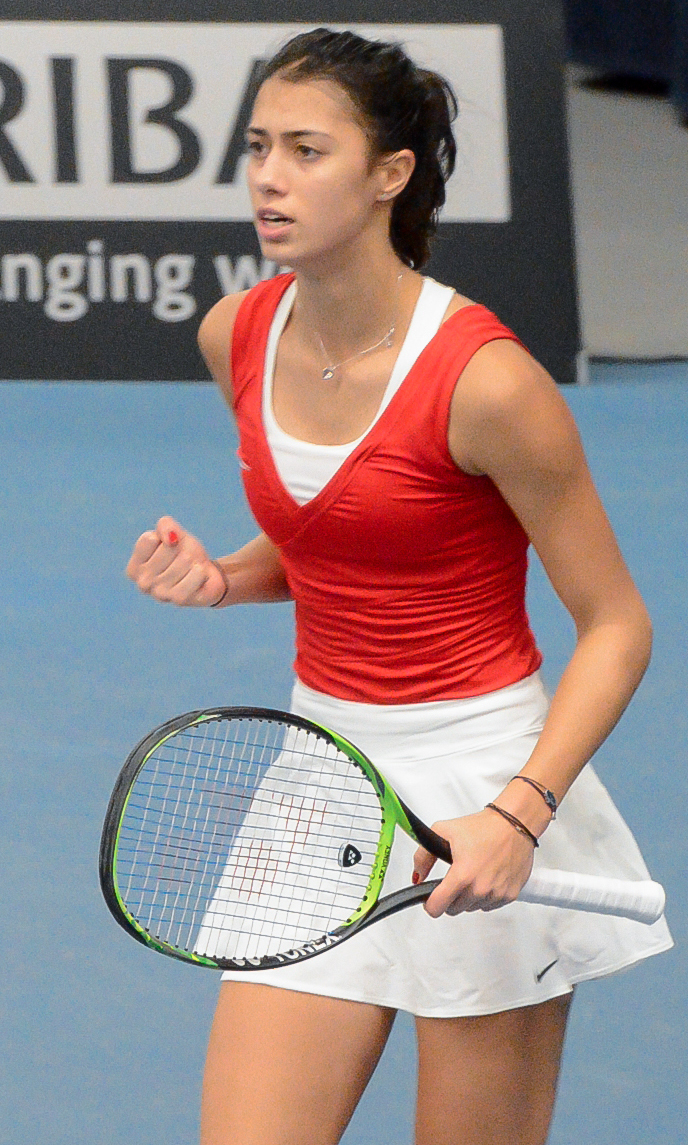
Danilović representing Serbia in the 2019 Fed Cup

Danilović made her Fed Cup debut in February 2018 in Group I of Fed Cup Europe/Africa Zone, winning all three singles matches, including a two set win over world No. 15, Anastasija Sevastova, in the promotional play-offs. The courageous performances for the national team earned Danilović a Fed Cup Heart Award and a cheque of $1,000 to be donated to a charity, which she chose to donate to University Children's Hospital in Belgrade.

In March, she won her first 25k title in Santa Margherita di Pula. In May, she was given a wildcard for the qualifying into the Premier Mandatory tournament in Madrid, where she beat former top-30 player Kateryna Bondarenko but lost to Aryna Sabalenka in the final round of qualifying. In mid-July, Danilović won the first 60k title in her career when she came back from one set down to beat another former top 30 player, Laura Siegemund, in the final of Versmold. She also reached the final in doubles of the same tournament with compatriot Nina Stojanović.

In late July, she won her first career WTA Tour singles title in Moscow, defeating Anastasia Potapova in the final, in three sets. Danilović became the first player born in the third millennium (after 2000) to win a WTA Tour singles title. She also became the second lucky loser in the history of the WTA Tour to win the title. This was the first WTA tournament final between two players under 18 since Tatiana Golovin and Nicole Vaidišová played in the final of the 2005 Japan Open.

She participated in the US Open qualifying, where she beat Bianca Andreescu, before losing to Jaimee Fourlis. She then entered the Tashkent Open, where she beat Anna Kalinskaya in the first round, before losing to Anastasia Potapova in a Moscow re-match. In the same tournament, she won the doubles title, partnering Tamara Zidanšek.

On 1 October 2018, Danilović entered the top 100 for the first time when she reached a singles ranking of 97. The following week, she reached her highest ranking of the season, world No. 96.

In mid-October, she lost in the first round of qualifying in Linz and Luxembourg. She next participated in the WTA 125 Mumbai Open, where she was seeded fourth and lost to Danka Kovinić in the first round, whom she also partnered with to reach the semifinals in doubles. This proved to be her last tournament of the year as she withdrew from the following week's WTA 125 Open de Limoges.

=== 2021: Australian Open and US Open debuts ===
Along with Francesca Jones, Danilović made her major main-draw debut at the Australian Open. She defeated 16th seed Petra Martić in the first round, before losing her next match to Shelby Rogers.

In July, she made two back-to-back quarterfinals. First, at the Budapest Grand Prix, she won first two rounds, before losing to Dalma Gálfi in the quarterfinal. The following week, at the Palermo Ladies Open, she lost to Zhang Shuai in the same round.

Danilović qualified for the US Open and defeated Alycia Parks in the first round. She withdrew just before her second round match against defending champion and third seed Naomi Osaka due to medical reasons.

=== 2022: French Open debut ===
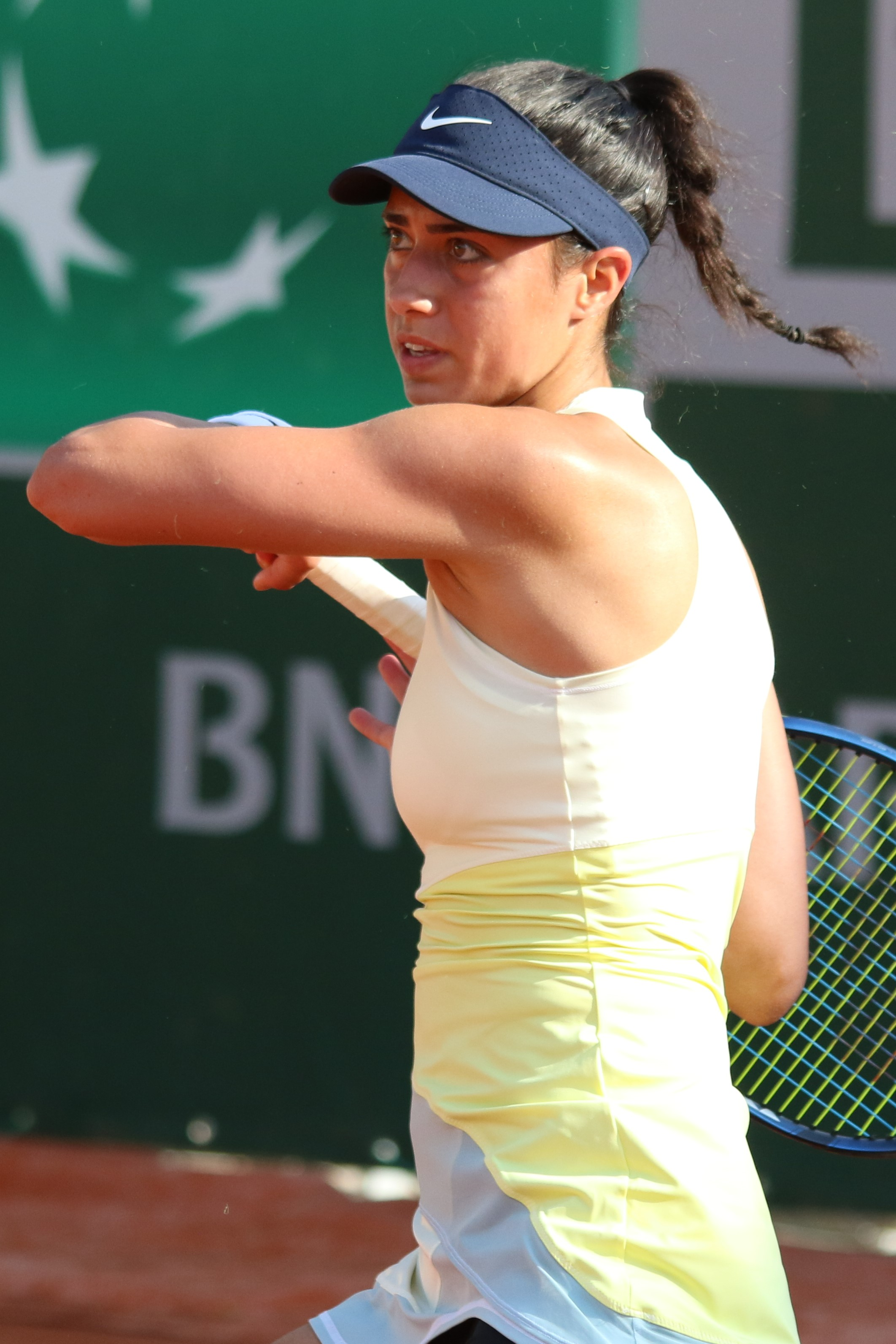
Danilović at the 2022 French Open

At the French Open, Danilović reached the main draw to make her debut at this major defeating Viktoriya Tomova in the final qualifying round. She defeated Dalma Gálfi in the first round, before losing to 23rd seed Jil Teichmann.

Ranked No. 124 as a qualifier at the Ladies Open Lausanne, she reached her second career final by beating Misaki Doi in the first round, Anna Kalinskaya in the second, home favorite Simona Waltert in the quarterfinals, and Anastasia Potapova in the semifinals. In the final, she was beaten by Petra Martić. At the same tournament, she won the doubles event, partnering with Kristina Mladenovic.

Playing with Elisabetta Cocciaretto, Danilović won the doubles title at the WTA 125 Open delle Puglie in September, defeating Andrea Gámiz and Eva Vedder in the final.

=== 2023: First WTA 125 title, back to top 100 ===
In May, Danilović won her first 100k title at the Open Villa de Madrid, beating Sara Sorribes Tormo in the final.

At the French Open, as a qualifier, Danilović reached the third round, her best performance at a major up to date, with wins over Jasmine Paolini and Kateryna Baindl. In the third round, she lost in three sets against No. 7 seed, Ons Jabeur. With this result, she returned after five years to the top 100, and reached a new career-high ranking of No. 93, on 26 June 2023 before Wimbledon.

Ranked No. 94 at the Swedish Open in Bastad, she defeated top seed Emma Navarro to lift her first WTA 125 title.

=== 2024: First hardcourt title ===
At the French Open, Danilović qualified for the main draw and defeated Martina Trevisan, 11th seed Danielle Collins, and Donna Vekić to reach the fourth round at a major for the first time. She became the first Serbian woman to reach the second week since Jelena Janković at Wimbledon 2015, and the first at Roland Garros since Ana Ivanovic in the same year. Her run was ended by fifth seed Markéta Vondroušová. She returned to the top 110 at world No. 107 on 10 June 2024.

Danilović got into the main draw at Wimbledon as a lucky loser, losing to Anca Todoni in the first round. She reached the semifinals at the Iași Open with wins over fourth seed Anna Blinkova, Anca Todoni, and eighth seed Anna Bondár, before losing to top seed Mirra Andreeva.

In October, she defeated Erika Andreeva, fifth seed Diane Parry qualifier Mananchaya Sawangkaew and top seed Kateřina Siniaková to make her first WTA Tour hardcourt final and third overall at the Guangzhou Open. Danilović won the final against qualifier Caroline Dolehide in straight sets to claim her second career title, six years after winning her first. As a result, she reached the top 55 in the rankings.

=== 2025: Top 35, WTA 250 final ===
Danilović reached the fourth round at the Australian Open for the first time with straight sets wins over Arantxa Rus, 25th seed Liudmila Samsonova and seventh seed Jessica Pegula. She lost to the 11th seed Paula Badosa.

In March, Danilović won the title at the WTA 125 Antalya Challenger, defeating Victoria Jiménez Kasintseva in the final. After this win, she peaked at world No. 35.

In April, Danilović reached the final of the Open de Rouen, in which she lost to top-seeded Elina Svitolina. As a result, she peaked at No. 34 in the singles rankings on 21 April 2025.

== Coaches ==
In 2018, Danilović hired former world No. 2, Àlex Corretja, as her coach, having been her mentor since 2016. During her title tour in Moscow, former Serbian Fed Cup captain, Dejan Vraneš, traveled with Danilović and coached her although he is not her official coach. In 2018–2019, she was briefly coached by Petar Popović. In 2017–18, her coach was Juan Lizariturry. Danilović was coached in the past by Denis Bejtulahi (in 2017) and Tatjana Ječmenica (in two stints – before late 2015 and in 2016).

== Performance timelines ==
Key
W	F	SF	QF	#R	RR	Q#	P#	DNQ	A	Z#	PO	G	S	B	NMS	NTI	P	NH

(W) winner; (F) finalist; (SF) semifinalist; (QF) quarterfinalist; (#R) rounds 4, 3, 2, 1; (RR) round-robin stage; (Q#) qualification round; (P#) preliminary round; (DNQ) did not qualify; (A) absent; (Z#) Davis/Fed Cup Zonal Group (with number indication) or (PO) play-off; (G) gold, (S) silver or (B) bronze Olympic/Paralympic medal; (NMS) not a Masters tournament; (NTI) not a Tier I tournament; (P) postponed; (NH) not held; (SR) strike rate (events won / competed); (W–L) win–loss record.
To avoid confusion and double counting, these charts are updated at the conclusion of a tournament or when the player's participation has ended.

Only main-draw results in WTA Tour, Grand Slam tournaments, BJK Cup and Olympic Games are included in win–loss records.

=== Singles ===
Current through the 2026 WTA Tour.

Tournament	2018	2019	2020	2021	2022	2023	2024	2025	2026	SR	W–L	Win %
Grand Slam tournaments
Australian Open	A	Q1	Q2	2R	A	Q3	Q2	4R	2R	0 / 3	5–3	63%
French Open	A	Q2	Q1	Q1	2R	3R	4R	3R	A	0 / 4	8–4	67%
Wimbledon	A	Q3	NH	Q1	A	Q1	1R	2R	A	0 / 2	1–2	33%
US Open	Q2	A	A	2R (Note: Withdrew before her second-round match against Naomi Osaka, not counted as a loss.)	Q1	Q1	Q1	1R	A	0 / 2	1–1	50%
Win–Loss	0–0	0–0	0–0	2–1	1–1	2–1	3–2	6–4	1–1	0 / 11	15–10	60%
WTA 1000
Dubai / Qatar Open (Note: The first Premier 5 event of the year has switched back and forth between the Dubai Tennis Championships and the Qatar Ladies Open since 2009. Dubai was classified as a Premier 5 event from 2009 to 2011 before being succeeded by Doha for the 2012–2014 period. In 2015, Dubai regained its Premier 5 status while Doha was demoted to Premier status. The Premier 5 tournaments were reclassified as WTA 1000 tournaments in 2021.)	A	A	A	A	A	Q1	A	A	A	0 / 0	0–0	–
Indian Wells Open	A	Q1	NH	A	A	1R	A	1R	A	0 / 2	0–2	0%
Miami Open	A	1R	NH	1R	A	Q1	A	1R	A	0 / 3	0–3	0%
Madrid Open	Q2	Q1	NH	A	A	Q1	2R	2R	A	0 / 2	2–2	50%
Italian Open	A	A	A	A	A	Q1	Q2	2R	A	0 / 1	1–1	50%
Canadian Open	A	A	NH	A	A	A	A	2R	A	0 / 1	0–1	0%
Cincinnati Open	A	A	A	A	A	A	A	2R	A	0 / 1	1–1	50%
Wuhan Open	A	A	Not held				A	1R		0 / 1	0–1	0%
China Open	A	A	Not held			A	A	A	A	0 / 0	0–0	–
Guadalajara Open	NH				A	A	NMS		A	0 / 0	0–0	–
Career statistics
Tournaments	2	5	1	7	3	2	6	7	0	Career total: 33		
Titles	1	0	0	0	0	0	1	0	0	Career total: 2		
Finals	1	0	0	0	1	0	1	1	0	Career total: 4		
Hard win–loss	1–1	0–4	0–1	2–4	0–1	0–2	5–2	4–5	0–0	1 / 19	12–20	38%
Clay win–loss	5–0	0–1	0–1	4–3	5–2	2–3	7–4	6–3	0–0	1 / 16	29–17	63%
Grass win–loss	0–0	0–0	0–0	0–0	0–0	0–0	0–1	0–0	0–0	0 / 1	0–1	0%
Overall win–loss	6–1	0–5	0–2	6–7	5–3	2–5	12–7	10–8	0–0	1 / 36	41–38	52%
Win (%)	86%	0%	0%	46%	63%	29%	63%	56%	–	Career total: 52%		
Year-end ranking (Note: 2017: WTA ranking–465.)	103	187	183	131	150	116	53	68		$2,984,527		

== WTA Tour finals ==
=== Singles: 4 (2 titles, 2 runner-ups) ===
Legend WTA 500 WTA 250 (2–2)	Finals by surface Hard (1–0) Clay (1–2)	Finals by setting Outdoor (2–1) Indoor (0–1)

Result	W–L	Date	Tournament	Tier	Surface	Opponent	Score
Win	1–0	Jul 2018	Moscow River Cup, Russia	International (Note: The WTA International tournaments were reclassified as WTA 250 tournaments in 2021.)	Clay	(Russia) Anastasia Potapova	7–5, 6–7^{(1–7)}, 6–4
Loss	1–1	Jul 2022	Ladies Open Lausanne, Switzerland	WTA 250	Clay	(Croatia) Petra Martić	4–6, 2–6
Win	2–1	Oct 2024	Guangzhou Open, China	WTA 250	Hard	(United States) Caroline Dolehide	6–3, 6–1
Loss	2–2	Apr 2025	Open de Rouen, France	WTA 250	Clay (i)	(Ukraine) Elina Svitolina	4–6, 6–7^{(8–10)}

=== Doubles: 4 (2 titles, 2 runner-ups) ===
Legend WTA 500 WTA 250 (2–2)	Finals by surface Hard (1–2) Clay (1–0)	Finals by setting Outdoor (2–0) Indoor (0–2)

Result	W–L	Date	Tournament	Tier	Surface	Partner	Opponents	Score
Win	1–0	Sep 2018	Tashkent Open, Uzbekistan	International	Hard	(Slovenia) Tamara Zidanšek	(Romania) Irina-Camelia Begu (Romania) Raluca Olaru	7–5, 6–3
Loss	1–1	Mar 2021	Lyon Open, France	WTA 250	Hard (i)	(Canada) Eugenie Bouchard	(Slovakia) Viktória Kužmová (Netherlands) Arantxa Rus	6–3, 5–7, [7–10]
Win	2–1	Jul 2022	Ladies Open Lausanne, Switzerland	WTA 250	Clay	(France) Kristina Mladenovic	(Norway) Ulrikke Eikeri (Slovenia) Tamara Zidanšek	walkover
Loss	2–2	Feb 2023	Lyon Open, France	WTA 250	Hard (i)	Alexandra Panova	(Spain) Cristina Bucșa (Netherlands) Bibiane Schoofs	6–7^{(5)}, 3–6

== WTA 125 finals ==
=== Singles: 2 (2 titles) ===
Result	W–L	Date	Tournament	Surface	Opponent	Score
Win	1–0	Jul 2023	Båstad Open, Sweden	Clay	(United States) Emma Navarro	7–6^{(4)}, 3–6, 6–3
Win	2–0	Mar 2025	Antalya Challenger, Turkey	Clay	(Andorra) Victoria Jiménez Kasintseva	6–2, 6–3

=== Doubles: 2 (1 title, 1 runner-up) ===
Result	W–L	Date	Tournament	Surface	Partner	Opponents	Score
Loss	0–1	Jun 2022	Makarska International, Croatia	Clay	(Serbia) Aleksandra Krunić	(Slovenia) Dalila Jakupović (Croatia) Tena Lukas	7–5, 2–6, [5–10]
Win	1–1	Sep 2022	Bari Open, Italy	Clay	(Italy) Elisabetta Cocciaretto	(Venezuela) Andrea Gámiz (Netherlands) Eva Vedder	6–2, 6–3

== ITF Circuit finals ==
=== Singles: 10 (7 titles, 3 runner-ups) ===
Legend $100,000 tournaments (2–0) $60,000 tournaments (2–1) $25,000 tournaments (1–2) $10/15,000 tournaments (2–0)	Finals by surface Clay (6–3) Hard (1–0)

Result	W–L	Date	Tournament	Tier	Surface	Opponent	Score
Win	1–0	Nov 2016	ITF Antalya, Turkey	10,000	Clay	(Slovakia) Vivien Juhászová	6–2, 6–3
Win	2–0	Mar 2017	ITF Antalya, Turkey	15,000	Clay	(Austria) Julia Grabher	6–3, 6–2
Loss	2–1	Nov 2017	ITF Sant Cugat, Spain	25,000	Clay	(Russia) Marta Paigina	6–2, 4–6, 3–6
Loss	2–2	Nov 2017	Open de Valencia, Spain	25,000+H	Clay	(Romania) Irina Bara	7–5, 4–6, 0–6
Win	3–2	Mar 2018	ITF Pula, Italy	25,000	Clay	(Italy) Federica di Sarra	6–4, 6–3
Win	4–2	Jul 2018	Reinert Open Versmold, Germany	60,000	Clay	(Germany) Laura Siegemund	5–7, 6–1, 6–3
Loss	4–3	Aug 2019	Ladies Open Hechingen, Germany	60,000	Clay	(Austria) Barbara Haas	2–6, 1–6
Win	5–3	Sep 2019	Montreux Ladies Open, Switzerland	60,000	Clay	(Austria) Julia Grabher	6–2, 6–3
Win	6–3	May 2023	Open Villa de Madrid, Spain	100,000	Clay	(Spain) Sara Sorribes Tormo	6–2, 6–3
Win	7–3	Oct 2024	Women's TEC Cup, Spain	100,000	Hard	(Netherlands) Arantxa Rus	6–2, 6–0

=== Doubles: 4 (1 title, 3 runner-ups) ===
Legend $60,000 tournaments (0–2) $25,000 tournaments (0–1) $10,000 tournaments (1–0)	Finals by surface Clay (1–3)

Result	W–L	Date	Tournament	Tier	Surface	Partner	Opponents	Score
Win	1–0	Nov 2016	ITF Antalya, Turkey	10,000	Clay	(Turkey) Berfu Cengiz	(Germany) Tayisiya Morderger (Germany) Yana Morderger	6–4, 6–4
Loss	1–1	Nov 2017	ITF Sant Cugat, Spain	25,000	Clay	(Spain) Guiomar Maristany	(Brazil) Luisa Stefani (Mexico) Renata Zarazúa	1–6, 4–6
Loss	1–2	Jul 2018	Reinert Open Versmold, Germany	60,000	Clay	(Serbia) Nina Stojanović	(Turkey) Pemra Özgen (Greece) Despina Papamichail	6–1, 2–6, [4–10]
Loss	1–3	Aug 2019	Ladies Open Hechingen, Germany	60,000	Clay	(Spain) Georgina García Pérez	(Romania) Cristina Dinu (North Macedonia) Lina Gjorcheska	6–4, 5–7, [7–10]

=== Junior Grand Slam tournament finals ===
==== Doubles: 3 (3 titles) ====
Result	Year	Tournament	Surface	Partner	Opponents	Score
Win	2016	French Open	Clay	(Spain) Paula Arias Manjón	(Russia) Olesya Pervushina (Russia) Anastasia Potapova	3–6, 6–3, [10–8]
Win	2017	Wimbledon	Grass	(Slovenia) Kaja Juvan	(United States) Caty McNally (United States) Whitney Osuigwe	6–4, 6–3
Win	2017	US Open	Hard	(Ukraine) Marta Kostyuk	(Croatia) Lea Bošković (China) Wang Xiyu	6–1, 7–5

== Team competitions ==
=== Fed Cup/Billie Jean King Cup ===
Legend
Finals
Finals qualifying round
Finals play-offs (0–1)
Zone Group (8–5)

=== Singles (6–2) ===
Edition	Round	Date	Location	Against	Surface	Opponent	W/L	Score
2018	Z1 RR	Feb 2018	Tallinn (EST)	Bulgaria	Hard (i)	Isabella Shinikova	W	6–3, 6–7, 7–6
2018	Z1 RR	Feb 2018	Tallinn (EST)	(Georgia (country)) Georgia	Hard (i)	Sofia Shapatava	W	6–3, 6–0
2018	Z1 PO	Feb 2018	Tallinn (EST)	Latvia	Hard (i)	Anastasija Sevastova	W	6–2, 6–4
2019	Z1 RR	Feb 2019	Bath (GBR)	(Georgia (country)) Georgia	Hard (i)	Ekaterine Gorgodze	W	7–5, 6–3
2019	Z1 RR	Feb 2019	Bath (GBR)	Croatia	Hard (i)	Jana Fett	W	2–6, 6–2, 7–6
2020–21	Z1 RR	Feb 2020	Esch-sur-Alzette (LUX)	Luxembourg	Hard (i)	Laura Correia	W	6–1, 6–2
2020–21	Z1 PO	Feb 2020	Esch-sur-Alzette (LUX)	Slovenia	Hard (i)	Kaja Juvan	L	2–6, 2–6
2020–21	F PO	Apr 2021	Kraljevo (SRB)	Canada	Hard (i)	Leylah Fernandez	L	5–7, 6–4, 4–6

=== Doubles (2–4) ===
Edition	Round	Date	Location	Against	Surface	Partner	Opponents	W/L	Score
2018	Z1 RR	Feb 2018	Tallinn (EST)	Bulgaria	Hard (i)	Dejana Radanović	Petia Arshinkova; Julia Terziyska	L	3–6, 6–7
2018	Z1 RR	Feb 2018	Tallinn (EST)	(Georgia (country)) Georgia	Hard (i)	Bojana Marinković	Mariam Bolkvadze; Sofia Shapatava	L	7–6, 6–7, 3–6
2018	Z1 PO	Feb 2018	Tallinn (EST)	Latvia	Hard (i)	Bojana Marinković	Jeļena Ostapenko; Anastasija Sevastova	L	1–6, 2–6
2019	Z1 RR	Feb 2019	Bath (GBR)	(Georgia (country)) Georgia	Hard (i)	Ivana Jorović	Mariam Bolkvadze; Oksana Kalashnikova	L	3–6, 5–7
2019	Z1 RR	Feb 2019	Bath (GBR)	Turkey	Hard (i)	Aleksandra Krunić	Berfu Cengiz; İpek Soylu	W	6–2, 6–3
2019	Z1 RR	Feb 2019	Bath (GBR)	Croatia	Hard (i)	Aleksandra Krunić	Darija Jurak; Ana Konjuh	W	1–6, 6–1, 6–4

== Record against top 10 players ==
Danilović has a 3–7 (30%) record against players who, at the time the matches were played, were ranked in the top 10.

Season	2018	2019	2020	2021	2022	2023	2024	2025	2026	Total
Wins	1	0	0	0	0	0	1	1	0	3
Losses	0	0	0	0	0	1	2	3	1	7

Result	W–L	Player	Rank	Event	Surface	Rd	Score	Rank
2018
Win	1–0	(Germany) Julia Görges	10	Moscow River Cup, Russia	Clay	QF	6–3, 6–3	187
2023
Loss	1–1	(Tunisia) Ons Jabeur	7	French Open, France	Clay	3R	6–4, 4–6, 2–6	105
2024
Loss	1–2	(Czech Republic) Markéta Vondroušová	7	United Cup, Australia	Hard	RR	1–6, 6–3, 3–6	121
Win	2–2	(United States) Danielle Collins	10	French Open, France	Clay	2R	6–7, 7–5, 6–4	125
Loss	2–3	(Czech Republic) Markéta Vondroušová	6	French Open, France	Clay	4R	4–6, 2–6	125
2025
Win	3–3	(United States) Jessica Pegula	6	Australian Open, Australia	Hard	3R	7–6, 6–1	55
Loss	3–4	(China) Zheng Qinwen	8	Italian Open, Italy	Clay	2R	1–6, 4–6	33
Loss	3–5	(Belarus) Aryna Sabalenka	1	French Open, France	Clay	3R	2–6, 3–6	34
Loss	3–6	(United States) Madison Keys	8	Wimbledon, United Kingdom	Grass	2R	4–6, 2–6	37
2026
Loss	3–7	(United States) Coco Gauff	3	Australian Open, Australia	Hard	2R	2–6, 2–6	69

== Award ==
- 2018 – Fed Cup Heart Award (Europe/Africa Zone Group I)

== Notes ==
Preceded by (India) Pranjala Yadlapalli / (Slovenia) Tamara Zidanšek	Orange Bowl Girls' Doubles Champion; 2016; With: (Russia) Anastasia Potapova	Succeeded by (Chinese Taipei) Joanna Garland / (Japan) Naho Sato
