= Amina Anshba =

Abkhazian tennis player (born 1999)

Amina Anshba Амина Аншба Амина Владиковна Аншба
- Full name: Amina Vladikovna Anshba
- Country (sports): Russia
- Born: 9 September 1999 (age 27)
- Plays: Left (two-handed backhand)
- Coach: Anton Chekhov
- Prize money: $291,348

Singles
- Career record: 275–213
- Career titles: 5 ITF
- Highest ranking: No. 278 (16 August 2021)

Doubles
- Career record: 323–196
- Career titles: 3 WTA 125
- Highest ranking: No. 71 (1 July 2024)
- Current ranking: No. 1,016 (26 October 2026)

Grand Slam doubles results
- French Open: 3R (2024)

Amina Vladikovna Anshba (Russian: Амина Владиковна Аншба; born 9 September 1999) is a Russian inactive tennis player.

Anshba has career-high WTA rankings of 278 in singles and 71 in doubles, achieved in August 2021 and July 2024, respectively. She has won three doubles titles on the WTA Challenger Tour along with five singles and 27 doubles titles on the ITF Circuit.

== Career ==
Anshba won her biggest title at the 2019 Reinert Open in Versmold, Germany in the doubles event, partnering Anastasia Dețiuc.

She made her WTA Tour main draw debut at the 2021 Poland Open in Gdinya, where she gained entry into the singles tournament as a lucky loser. She defeated Harmony Tan, before losing to Nuria Parrizas Diaz.

Partnering Panna Udvardy, she finished runner-up at the 2022 Palermo Ladies Open. They were defeated by the defending champion Kimberley Zimmermann, who played alongside Anna Bondár.

Alongside Quinn Gleason, she won the doubles title at the 2023 Ljubljana Open. Ranked No. 424, she entered the 2023 Jiangxi Open as a lucky loser and defeated Elina Avanesyan for her first top-100 win and only her second tour-level win (following Gdynia 2021). She lost to eventual runner-up, Marie Bouzková.

In May 2024, she won her second WTA 125 title with Anastasia Dețiuc at the Saint-Malo Open.

She made her Grand Slam tournament debut at the 2024 French Open also with Anastasia Dețiuc, as an alternate pair, and recorded her first major wins over Romanian pair Jaqueline Cristian and Ana Bogdan, and sixth seeds Lyudmyla Kichenok and Jeļena Ostapenko. They lost to 11th seeds and eventual runners-up, Jasmine Paolini and Sara Errani.

== WTA Tour finals ==
=== Doubles: 2 (runner-ups) ===
Legend WTA 250 (0–2)	Finals by surface Clay (0–2)

Result	W–L	Date	Tournament	Tier	Surface	Partner	Opponents	Score
Loss	0–1	Jul 2022	Palermo Ladies Open, Italy	WTA 250	Clay	(Hungary) Panna Udvardy	(Hungary) Anna Bondár (Belgium) Kimberley Zimmermann	3–6, 2–6
Loss	0–2	Jul 2023	Ladies Open Lausanne, Switzerland	WTA 250	Clay	(Czech Republic) Anastasia Dețiuc	(Hungary) Anna Bondár (France) Diane Parry	2–6, 1–6

== WTA 125 finals ==
=== Doubles: 4 (3 titles, 1 runner-up) ===
Result	W–L	Date	Tournament	Surface	Partner	Opponents	Score
Loss	0–1	Jul 2023	Contrexéville Open, France	Clay	(Czech Republic) Anastasia Dețiuc	(Spain) Cristina Bucșa (Russia) Alena Fomina-Klotz	6–4, 3–6, [7–10]
Win	1–1	Sep 2023	Ljubljana Open, Slovenia	Clay	(United States) Quinn Gleason	(United Kingdom) Freya Christie (Colombia) Yuliana Lizarazo	6–3, 6–4
Win	2–1	May 2024	Open de Saint-Malo, France	Clay	(Czech Republic) Anastasia Dețiuc	(France) Carole Monnet (France) Estelle Cascino	7–6^{(7)}, 2–6, [10–5]
Win	3–1	Feb 2025	Mumbai Open, India	Hard	(Russia) Elena Pridankina	(Netherlands) Arianne Hartono (India) Prarthana Thombare	7–6^{(4)}, 2–6, [10–7]

== ITF Circuit finals ==
=== Singles: 15 (5 titles, 10 runner-ups) ===
Legend $25,000 tournaments (0–1) $10/15,000 tournaments (5–9)	Finals by surface Clay (5–10)

Result	W–L	Date	Tournament	Tier	Surface	Opponent	Score
Loss	0–1	Jul 2015	ITF Telavi, Georgia	10,000	Clay	(Russia) Anastasia Gasanova	3–6, 4–6
Win	1–1	Jul 2016	Kazan Open, Russia	10,000	Clay	(Russia) Anastasia Gasanova	5–7, 6–1, 6–0
Loss	1–2	May 2017	ITF Antalya, Turkey	15,000	Clay	(Chile) Bárbara Gatica	2–6, 5–7
Loss	1–3	Sep 2017	ITF Antalya, Turkey	15,000	Clay	(Sweden) Fanny Östlund	3–6, 1–6
Loss	1–4	Sep 2017	ITF Antalya, Turkey	15,000	Clay	(Poland) Marta Leśniak	3–6, 1–6
Loss	1–5	Dec 2017	ITF Antalya, Turkey	15,000	Clay	(Ukraine) Maryna Chernyshova	4–6, 4–6
Loss	1–6	Mar 2018	ITF Antalya, Turkey	15,000	Clay	(Romania) Ilona Georgiana Ghioroaie	6–7^{(1)}, 6–3, 4–6
Win	2–6	Mar 2018	ITF Antalya, Turkey	15,000	Clay	(Turkey) Başak Eraydın	6–0, 6–0
Loss	2–7	Mar 2018	ITF Antalya, Turkey	15,000	Clay	(Slovakia) Rebecca Šramková	1–6, 6–7^{(3)}
Loss	2–8	Apr 2018	ITF Hammamet, Tunisia	15,000	Clay	(France) Margot Yerolymos	1–6, 2–6
Loss	2–9	Aug 2018	ITF Vrnjačka Banja, Serbia	15,000	Clay	(Serbia) Draginja Vuković	2–6, 4–6
Loss	2–10	Oct 2018	ITF Pula, Italy	25,000	Clay	(Spain) Sara Sorribes Tormo	4–6, 3–6
Win	3–10	Aug 2019	ITF Moscow, Russia	W15	Clay	(Russia) Vlada Koval	6–4, 6–2
Win	4–10	Aug 2019	ITF Moscow, Russia	W15	Clay	(Russia) Elina Avanesyan	6–4, 6–3
Win	5–10	Dec 2020	ITF Antalya, Turkey	W15	Clay	(Russia) Julia Avdeeva	6–2, 7–5

=== Doubles: 50 (27 titles, 23 runner-ups) ===
Legend W100 tournaments (2–1) W60/75 tournaments (6–3) W25/35 tournaments (13–12) W10/15 tournaments (6–7)	Finals by surface Hard (1–6) Clay (25–17) Carpet (1–0)

Result	W–L	Date	Tournament	Tier	Surface	Partner	Opponents	Score
Loss	0–1	Jul 2015	Telavi Open, Georgia	10,000	Clay	(Russia) Adelina Baravi	(Armenia) Ani Amiraghyan (China) Chen Chaoyi	3–6, 4–6
Win	1–1	Sep 2015	ITF Telavi, Georgia	10,000	Clay	(Armenia) Ani Amiraghyan	(Russia) Polina Golubovskaya (Russia) Alina Kislitskaya	6–1, 6–1
Loss	1–2	Jul 2016	Kazan Open, Russia	10,000	Clay	(Russia) Angelina Gabueva	(Russia) Olga Doroshina (Russia) Yana Sizikova	4–6, 7–6^{(8)}, [5–10]
Win	2–2	Jul 2016	ITF Niš, Serbia	10,000	Clay	(Russia) Angelina Gabueva	(Serbia) Tamara Čurović (Serbia) Natalija Kostić	7–5, 7–5
Win	3–2	Aug 2016	ITF Moscow, Russia	10,000	Clay	(Russia) Angelina Gabueva	(Armenia) Ani Amiraghyan (Russia) Daria Lodikova	6–4, 6–4
Loss	3–3	Apr 2017	ITF Antalya, Turkey	15,000	Clay	(Netherlands) Nina Kruijer	(Sweden) Jacqueline Cabaj Awad (France) Margot Yerolymos	6–7^{(5)}, 6–3, [8–10]
Win	4–3	May 2017	ITF Antalya, Turkey	15,000	Clay	(Russia) Elena Rybakina	(Russia) Daria Nazarkina (Russia) Anna Ukolova	7–5, 4–6, [10–8]
Loss	4–4	Sep 2017	ITF Antalya, Turkey	15,000	Clay	(Turkey) Melis Sezer	(Romania) Georgia Crăciun (Romania) Andreea Ghițescu	2–6, 2–6
Loss	4–5	Mar 2018	ITF Antalya, Turkey	15,000	Clay	(Ukraine) Anastasiya Vasylyeva	(Hungary) Ágnes Bukta (Bosnia and Herzegovina) Dea Herdželaš	3–6, 3–6
Loss	4–6	Mar 2018	ITF Antalya, Turkey	15,000	Clay	(Turkey) Melis Sezer	(United States) Catherine Harrison (United States) Sarah Lee	4–6, 3–6
Loss	4–7	Mar 2018	ITF Antalya, Turkey	15,000	Clay	(Kyrgyzstan) Ksenia Palkina	(Switzerland) Xenia Knoll (Sweden) Cornelia Lister	0–6, 7–5, [8–10]
Loss	4–8	Apr 2018	Nana Trophy Tunis, Tunisia	25,000	Clay	(Italy) Anastasia Grymalska	(Ukraine) Maryna Chernyshova (Australia) Seone Mendez	6–7^{(5)}, 4–6
Win	5–8	Apr 2018	ITF Hammamet, Tunisia	15,000	Clay	(Russia) Maria Marfutina	(Ukraine) Maryna Chernyshova (Romania) Oana Gavrilă	4–6, 6–2, [12–10]
Win	6–8	Jun 2018	ITF Óbidos, Portugal	25,000	Carpet	(Georgia (country)) Sofia Shapatava	(Romania) Laura Ioana Paar (Germany) Julia Wachaczyk	6–7^{(4)}, 6–0, [11–9]
Loss	6–9	Sep 2018	ITF Sofia, Bulgaria	25,000	Clay	(Russia) Polina Monova	(France) Manon Arcangioli (Belgium) Marie Benoît	4–6, 6–7^{(5)}
Win	7–9	Oct 2018	ITF Pula, Italy	25,000	Clay	(Georgia (country)) Sofia Shapatava	(Italy) Martina di Giuseppe (Italy) Anna-Giulia Remondina	7–6^{(5)}, 2–6, [10–6]
Loss	7–10	Apr 2019	ITF Andijan, Uzbekistan	W25	Hard	(Czech Republic) Anastasia Dețiuc	(Serbia) Tamara Čurović (Hong Kong) Eudice Chong	2–6, 3–6
Loss	7–11	Jun 2019	ITF Minsk, Belarus	W25	Hard	(Czech Republic) Anastasia Dețiuc	(Italy) Martina Colmegna (Norway) Ulrikke Eikeri	6–1, 4–6, [6–10]
Win	8–11	Jul 2019	Reinert Open Versmold, Germany	W60	Clay	(Czech Republic) Anastasia Dețiuc	(India) Ankita Raina (Netherlands) Bibiane Schoofs	0–6, 6–3, [10–8]
Win	9–11	Jul 2019	ITF Moscow, Russia	W25	Clay	(Czech Republic) Anastasia Dețiuc	(Belarus) Ilona Kremen (Russia) Ekaterina Makarova	6–2, 6–4
Win	10–11	Aug 2019	ITF Moscow, Russia	W15	Clay	(Russia) Aleksandra Pospelova	(Russia) Vlada Koval (Russia) Evgeniya Levashova	6–4, 6–3
Win	11–11	Sep 2019	Royal Cup, Montenegro	W25	Clay	(Czech Republic) Anastasia Dețiuc	(Finland) Anastasia Kulikova (Russia) Evgeniya Levashova	2–6, 6–3, [10–7]
Loss	11–12	Oct 2019	ITF Pula, Italy	W25	Clay	(Czech Republic) Anastasia Dețiuc	(Japan) Eri Hozumi (Japan) Yuki Naito	4–6, 6–7
Win	12–12	Oct 2019	ITF Pula, Italy	W25	Clay	(Czech Republic) Anastasia Dețiuc	(Switzerland) Ylena In-Albon (Italy) Giorgia Marchetti	7–5, 6–1
Loss	12–13	Feb 2020	Empire Slovak Open, Slovakia	W25	Hard	(Czech Republic) Anastasia Dețiuc	(Hungary) Anna Bondár (Slovakia) Tereza Mihalíková	4–6, 4–6
Win	13–13	Mar 2021	ITF Buenos Aires, Argentina	W25	Clay	(Hungary) Panna Udvardy	(Greece) Valentini Grammatikopoulou (Netherlands) Richèl Hogenkamp	7–5, 6–2
Win	14–13	Apr 2021	ITF Córdoba, Argentina	W25	Clay	(Hungary) Panna Udvardy	(Chile) Bárbara Gatica (Brazil) Rebeca Pereira	6–3, 6–3
Loss	14–14	Jun 2021	Macha Lake Open, Czech Republic	W60	Clay	(Czech Republic) Anastasia Dețiuc	(Greece) Valentini Grammatikopoulou (Netherlands) Richèl Hogenkamp	3–6, 4–6
Win	15–14	Jun 2021	ITF Klosters, Switzerland	W25	Clay	(Czech Republic) Anastasia Dețiuc	(Switzerland) Jenny Dürst (Poland) Weronika Falkowska	3–6, 6–1, [10–3]
Loss	15–15	Jul 2021	Amstelveen Open, Netherlands	W60	Clay	(Czech Republic) Anastasia Dețiuc	(Netherlands) Suzan Lamens (Netherlands) Quirine Lemoine	4–6, 3–6
Win	16–15	Sep 2021	Collonge-Bellerive Open, Switzerland	W60	Clay	(Russia) Anastasia Gasanova	(France) Amandine Hesse (Germany) Tatjana Maria	6–1, 6–7^{(6)}, [10–8]
Loss	16–16	Sep 2021	ITF Johannesburg, South Africa	W25	Hard	(Russia) Vlada Koval	(Netherlands) Eva Vedder (Netherlands) Stéphanie Visscher	4–6, 4–6
Win	17–16	Oct 2021	ITF Pretoria, South Africa	W25	Hard	(United States) Elizabeth Mandlik	(Switzerland) Jenny Dürst (Switzerland) Nina Stadler	6–2, 6–2
Win	18–16	Feb 2022	ITF Antalya, Turkey	W25	Clay	(Belgium) Marie Benoît	(Romania) Andreea Roșca (Romania) Ioana Loredana Roșca	7–5, 7–6^{(4)}
Loss	18–17	Mar 2022	ITF Antalya, Turkey	W25	Clay	(Russia) Maria Timofeeva	(Russia) Diana Shnaider (Hungary) Amarissa Tóth	4–6, 2–6
Win	19–17	May 2022	Wiesbaden Open, Germany	W100	Clay	(Hungary) Panna Udvardy	(Venezuela) Andrea Gomez (Netherlands) Eva Vedder	6–2, 6–4
Loss	19–18	Sep 2022	ITF Almaty, Kazakhstan	W25	Clay	(Russia) Sofya Lansere	(Russia) Ekaterina Yashina (Kazakhstan) Zhibek Kulambayeva	6–7^{(4)}, 7–5, [8–10]
Win	20–18	Oct 2022	ITF Pula, Italy	W25	Clay	(Romania) Oana Georgeta Simion	(Italy) Angelica Moratelli (Italy) Lisa Pigato	6–3, 6–1
Win	21–18	Jan 2023	ITF Buenos Aires, Argentina	W25	Clay	(Ukraine) Valeriya Strakhova	(Colombia) Yuliana Lizarazo (Colombia) María Paulina Pérez	1–6, 6–4, [10–7]
Win	22–18	Jan 2023	ITF Buenos Aires, Argentina	W25	Clay	(Ukraine) Valeriya Strakhova	(Colombia) María Herazo González (Peru) Romina Ccuno	6–1, 6–2
Loss	22–19	Mar 2023	Trnava Indoor, Slovakia	W60	Hard (i)	(Czech Republic) Anastasia Dețiuc	(United Kingdom) Olivia Nicholls (United Kingdom) Alicia Barnett	3–6, 3–6
Win	23–19	May 2023	Empire Slovak Open, Slovakia	W100	Clay	(Czech Republic) Anastasia Dețiuc	(France) Estelle Cascino (Netherlands) Suzan Lamens	6–3, 4–6, [10–4]
Win	24–19	Jul 2023	Open de Montpellier, France	W60	Clay	(Russia) Sofya Lansere	(Germany) Julia Lohoff (Romania) Andreea Mitu	6–4, 6–3
Win	25–19	Aug 2023	Montreux Ladies Open, Switzerland	W60	Clay	(Netherlands) Lexie Stevens	(Portugal) Francisca Jorge (Portugal) Matilde Jorge	1–6, 7–5, [12–10]
Loss	25–20	Jan 2024	ITF Antalya, Turkiye	W35	Clay	(Ukraine) Valeriya Strakhova	(Romania) Cristina Dinu (Slovenia) Nika Radišić	2–6, 6–3, [11–13]
Loss	25–21	Feb 2024	ITF Hammamet, Tunisia	W35	Clay	(Germany) Katharina Hobgarski	(Romania) Oana Gavrilă (Greece) Sapfo Sakellaridi	7–6^{(5)}, 5–7, [4–10]
Win	26–21	Jun 2024	ITS Cup, Czech Republic	W75	Clay	(Greece) Valentini Grammatikopoulou	(Germany) Lena Papadakis (United States) Jessie Aney	6–2, 6–4
Win	27–21	Sep 2024	Serbian Tennis Tour, Serbia	W75	Clay	(Germany) Noma Noha Akugue	(Romania) Cristina Dinu (Bulgaria) Lia Karatancheva	6–2, 7–6^{(2)}
Loss	27–22	Jan 2025	ITF Bengaluru Open, India	W100	Hard	(Russia) Elena Pridankina	(United States) Jessie Aney (United States) Jessica Failla	2–6, 6–4, [6–10]
Loss	27–23	Feb 2025	ITF Antalya, Turkey	W35	Clay	(Japan) Yuki Naito	(Chinese Taipei) Li Yu-yun (China) Li Zongyu	3–6, 4–6
