= Reinert Open =

- 2022 Reinert Open

ITF Women's Tour
- Event name: Reinert Open
- Location: Versmold, Germany
- Venue: Tennispark Versmold
- Category: ITF Women's Circuit
- Surface: Clay
- Draw: 32S/32Q/16D
- Prize money: $100,000
- Website: www.reinert-open.de

The Reinert Open is a tournament for professional female tennis players played on outdoor clay courts. The event is classified as a $100,000 ITF Women's Circuit tournament and has been held in Versmold, Germany, since 2008.

== Past finals ==
=== Singles ===
Year	Champion	Runner-up	Score
2022	(Czech Republic) Linda Nosková	(Belgium) Ysaline Bonaventure	6–1, 6–3
2021	(Russia) Elina Avanesyan	(Italy) Federica Di Sarra	6–7^{(4–7)}, 6–2, 6–2
2020	Tournament cancelled due to the COVID-19 pandemic		
2019	(Serbia) Nina Stojanović	(Germany) Katharina Hobgarski	6–0, 7–5
2018	(Serbia) Olga Danilović	(Germany) Laura Siegemund	5–7, 6–1, 6–3
2017	(Romania) Mihaela Buzărnescu	(Austria) Barbara Haas	6–0, 6–2
2016	(Germany) Antonia Lottner	(Czech Republic) Tereza Smitková	3–6, 7–5, 6–3
2015	(Germany) Carina Witthöft	(Sweden) Johanna Larsson	6–3, 6–3
2014	(Ukraine) Kateryna Kozlova	(Netherlands) Richèl Hogenkamp	6–4, 6–7^{(3–7)}, 6–1
2013	(Germany) Dinah Pfizenmaier	(Ukraine) Maryna Zanevska	6–4, 4–6, 6–4
2012	(Germany) Annika Beck	(Latvia) Anastasija Sevastova	6–3, 6–1
2011	(Colombia) Mariana Duque Mariño	(Germany) Scarlett Werner	7–6^{(7–2)}, 7–5
2010	(Poland) Magda Linette	(Romania) Irina-Camelia Begu	6−2, 7−5
2009	(Germany) Sarah Gronert	(Croatia) Darija Jurak	6–3, 3–6, 7–6^{(7–5)}
2008	(Italy) Evelyn Mayr	(Indonesia) Romana Tedjakusuma	5–7, 6–4, 6–3

=== Doubles ===
Year	Champions	Runners-up	Score
2022	(Kazakhstan) Anna Danilina (Netherlands) Arianne Hartono	(India) Ankita Raina (Netherlands) Rosalie van der Hoek	6–7^{(4–7)}, 6–4, [10–6]
2021	(Kazakhstan) Anna Danilina (Ukraine) Valeriya Strakhova	(Sweden) Mirjam Björklund (Australia) Jaimee Fourlis	4–6, 7–5, [10–4]
2020	Tournament cancelled due to the COVID-19 pandemic		
2019	(Russia) Amina Anshba (Czech Republic) Anastasia Dețiuc	(India) Ankita Raina (Netherlands) Bibiane Schoofs	0–6, 6–3, [10–8]
2018	(Turkey) Pemra Özgen (Greece) Despina Papamichail	(Serbia) Olga Danilović (Serbia) Nina Stojanović	1–6, 6–2, [10–4]
2017	(Germany) Katharina Gerlach (Germany) Julia Wachaczyk	(Japan) Misa Eguchi (Japan) Akiko Omae	4–6, 6–1, [10–7]
2016	(Russia) Natela Dzalamidze (Ukraine) Valeriya Strakhova	(Japan) Kanae Hisami (Japan) Kotomi Takahata	6–2, 6–1
2015	(Czech Republic) Eva Hrdinová (Israel) Shahar Pe'er	(Ukraine) Alona Fomina (Ukraine) Sofiya Kovalets	6–1, 6–3
2014	(Canada) Gabriela Dabrowski (Colombia) Mariana Duque	(Paraguay) Verónica Cepede Royg (Liechtenstein) Stephanie Vogt	6–4, 6–2
2013	(Georgia (country)) Sofia Shapatava (Georgia (country)) Anna Tatishvili	(France) Claire Feuerstein (Czech Republic) Renata Voráčová	6–4, 6–4
2012	(Argentina) Mailen Auroux (Argentina) María Irigoyen	(Romania) Elena Bogdan (Hungary) Réka-Luca Jani	6–1, 6–4
2011	(Ukraine) Elizaveta Ianchuk (Italy) Julia Mayr	(Chile) Cecilia Costa Melgar (Chile) Daniela Seguel	6–4, 6–3
2010	(Czech Republic) Hana Birnerová (Japan) Erika Sema	(Russia) Aminat Kushkhova (Russia) Olga Panova	6–3, 6–3
2009	(Germany) Elisa Peth (Germany) Scarlett Werner	(Australia) Alenka Hubacek (New Zealand) Kairangi Vano	w/o
2008	(France) Samantha Schoeffel (Netherlands) Bibiane Schoofs	(Germany) Nicola Geuer (Germany) Laura Haberkorn	4–6, 7–6^{(7–5)}, [10–5]
