= Antonia Lottner =

German tennis player

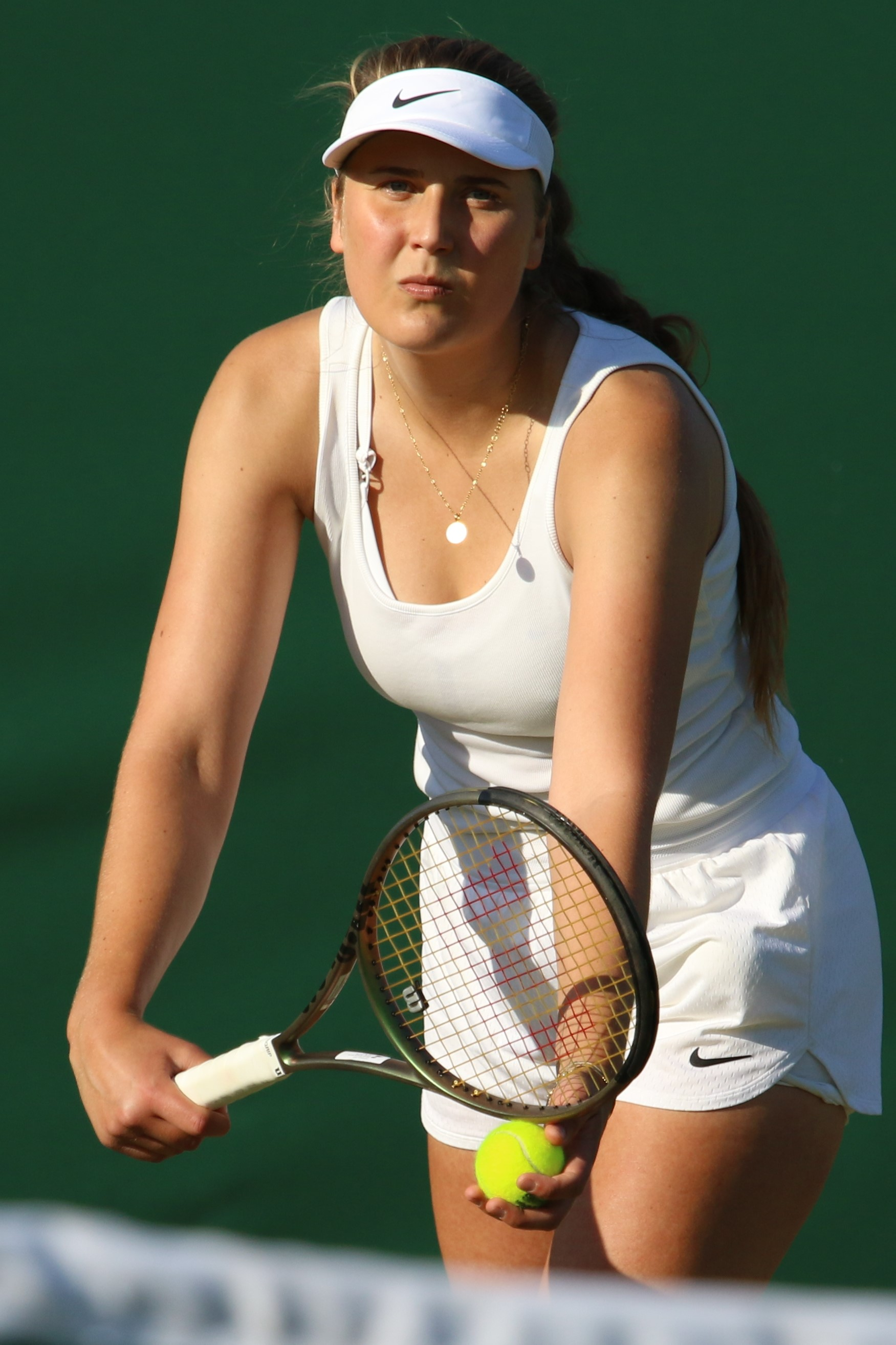
- Lottner at the 2022 Wimbledon Championships
- Country (sports): Germany
- Born: 13 August 1996 (age 29) Düsseldorf-Kaiserswerth, Germany
- Height: 1.85 m (6 ft 1 in)
- Turned pro: 2010
- Retired: 2025
- Prize money: $646,879

Singles
- Career record: 199–157
- Career titles: 7 ITF
- Highest ranking: No. 128 (25 June 2018)

Grand Slam singles results
- Australian Open: 1R (2020)
- French Open: 1R (2019)
- Wimbledon: 1R (2018)
- US Open: 1R (2016)

Doubles
- Career record: 80–50
- Career titles: 6 ITF
- Highest ranking: No. 131 (13 April 2015)

Team competitions
- Fed Cup: SF (2018), record 2–1

Antonia Lottner (German pronunciation: [anˈtoːni̯a ˈlɔtnɐ]; born 13 August 1996) is a German former tennis player.

Lottner won seven singles titles and six doubles titles on the ITF Women's Circuit. In June 2018, she reached her best singles ranking of world No. 128. In April 2015, she peaked at No. 131 in the doubles rankings.

== Career highlights ==
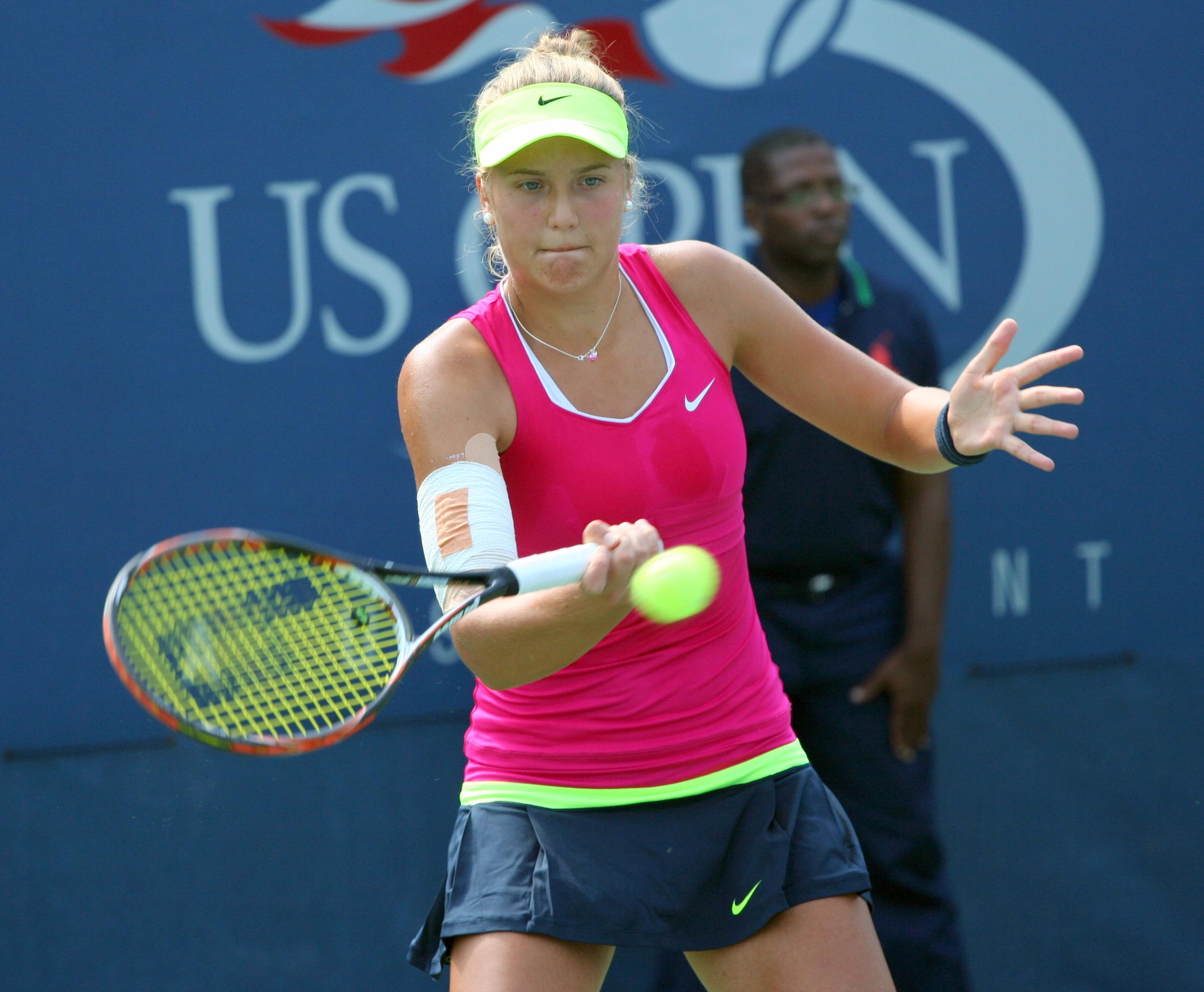
Lottner in 2012

In June 2017, Lottner won her first WTA Tour match in s-Hertogenbosch, Netherlands. As a qualifier, she upset then-world No. 6, Dominika Cibulková, in the first round.

== Junior Grand Slam tournament finals ==
=== Girls' singles: 1 (runner-up) ===
Result	Year	Tournament	Surface	Opponent	Score
Loss	2013	French Open	Clay	(Switzerland) Belinda Bencic	1–6, 3–6

== Grand Slam performance timeline ==
Key
W	F	SF	QF	#R	RR	Q#	DNQ	A	NH

(W) winner; (F) finalist; (SF) semifinalist; (QF) quarterfinalist; (#R) rounds 4, 3, 2, 1; (RR) round-robin stage; (Q#) qualification round; (DNQ) did not qualify; (A) absent; (NH) not held; (SR) strike rate (events won / competed); (W–L) win–loss record.
To avoid confusion and double counting, these charts are updated at the conclusion of a tournament or when the player's participation has ended.

Only results in WTA Tour and Grand Slam tournaments main-draw, Olympic Games and Fed Cup are included in win–loss records.

=== Singles ===
Tournament	2014	2015	2016	2017	2018	2019	2020	2021	2022	SR	W–L
Grand Slam tournaments
Australian Open	A	A	A	Q1	Q2	Q3	1R	Q2	A	0 / 1	0–1
French Open	A	A	A	Q2	Q1	1R	Q1	Q2	A	0 / 1	0–1
Wimbledon	A	A	A	Q3	1R	Q3	NH	A	Q1	0 / 1	0–1
US Open	A	A	1R	Q2	Q2	Q1	A	A	A	0 / 1	0–1
Win–loss	0–0	0–0	0–1	0–0	0–1	0–1	0–1	0–0	0–0	0 / 4	0–4
National representation
Billie Jean King Cup	A	A	A	A	SF	A	QR	A	A	0 / 1	1–1
Career statistics
Tournaments	2	1	3	4	8	6	2	0	0	26	
Overall win–loss	0–2	0–1	0–3	3–4	5–9	4–6	0–2	0–0	0–0	12–27	
Year-end ranking	456	286	176	201	152	160	179	439	–	31%	

== WTA Challenger finals ==
=== Singles: 1 (runner-up) ===
Result	W–L	Date	Tournament	Surface	Opponent	Score
Loss	0–1	Nov 2017	Open de Limoges, France	Hard (i)	(Romania) Monica Niculescu	4–6, 2–6

== ITF Circuit finals ==
=== Singles: 8 (7 titles, 1 runner-up) ===
Legend $75,000 tournaments (1–0) $50,000 tournaments (1–0) $25,000 tournaments (0–1) $10/15,000 tournaments (5–0)	Finals by surface Hard (3–0) Clay (4–0) Carpet (0–1)

Result	W–L	Date	Tournament	Tier	Surface	Opponent	Score
Win	1–0	Oct 2011	ITF Stockholm, Sweden	10,000	Hard (i)	(Netherlands) Quirine Lemoine	4–6, 6–4, 7–5
Win	2–0	Feb 2013	ITF Mâcon, France	10,000	Hard (i)	(Italy) Anna Remondina	7–5, 7–5
Win	3–0	Jun 2013	ITF Cologne, Germany	10,000	Clay	(Ukraine) Anastasiya Vasylyeva	4–6, 6–4, 7–5
Win	4–0	Aug 2014	ITF Braunschweig, Germany	15,000	Clay	(Switzerland) Conny Perrin	6–3, 6–3
Win	5–0	Jan 2015	ITF Stuttgart, Germany	10,000	Hard (i)	(Turkey) Pemra Özgen	3–6, 6–3, 6–2
Loss	5–1	Feb 2015	AK Ladies Open, Germany	25,000	Carpet (i)	(Germany) Carina Witthöft	3–6, 4–6
Win	6–1	Jul 2016	Reinert Open Versmold, Germany	50,000	Clay	(Czech Republic) Tereza Smitková	3–6, 7–5, 6–3
Win	7–1	Jul 2016	ITF Prague Open, Czech Republic	75,000	Clay	(Germany) Carina Witthöft	7–6^{(8–6)}, 1–6, 7–5

=== Doubles: 14 (6 titles, 8 runner-ups) ===
Legend $50,000 tournaments (1–0) $25,000 tournaments (4–4) $10,000 tournaments (1–4)	Finals by surface Hard (2–3) Clay (2–5) Carpet (2–0)

Result	W–L	Date	Tournament	Tier	Surface	Partner	Opponents	Score
Loss	0–1	Aug 2010	ITF Braunschweig, Germany	10,000	Clay	(Germany) Jana Nabel	(Russia) Aminat Kushkhova (Russia) Olga Panova	3–6, 0–6
Loss	0–2	Oct 2011	ITF Stockholm, Sweden	10,000	Hard (i)	(United Kingdom) Eleanor Dean	(Netherlands) Quirine Lemoine (Netherlands) Lisanne van Riet	5–7, 1–6
Win	1–2	Jul 2012	ITF Darmstadt, Germany	25,000	Clay	(Germany) Julia Kimmelmann	(Czech Republic) Martina Borecká (Czech Republic) Petra Krejsová	6–3, 6–1
Loss	1–3	Feb 2013	ITF Leimen, Germany	10,000	Hard (i)	(Russia) Daria Salnikova	(Germany) Carolin Daniels (Germany) Laura Siegemund	1–6, 4–6
Win	2–3	Feb 2013	ITF Mâcon, France	10,000	Hard (i)	(Russia) Daria Salnikova	(Italy) Francesca Palmigiano (Italy) Anna Remondina	6–4, 5–7, [10–7]
Loss	2–4	Jun 2013	ITF Cologne, Germany	10,000	Clay	(Serbia) Tamara Čurović	(Russia) Eugeniya Pashkova (Ukraine) Anastasiya Vasylyeva	3–6, 7–5, [6–10]
Loss	2–5	Aug 2013	ITF Westende, Belgium	25,000	Hard	(Latvia) Diāna Marcinkēviča	(Argentina) Tatiana Búa (Chile) Daniela Seguel	3–6, 7–5, [9–11]
Loss	2–6	Aug 2014	Ladies Open Hechingen, Germany	25,000	Clay	(Germany) Carolin Daniels	(Romania) Elena Bogdan (Russia) Valeria Solovyeva	3–6, 1–6
Win	3–6	Nov 2014	ITF Sharm El Sheikh, Egypt	25,000	Hard	(Germany) Laura Siegemund	(Ukraine) Olga Ianchuk (Slovenia) Nastja Kolar	6–1, 6–1
Win	4–6	Feb 2015	AK Ladies Open, Germany	25,000	Carpet (i)	(Croatia) Ana Vrljić	(Austria) Sandra Klemenschits (Germany) Tatjana Maria	6–4, 3–6, [11–9]
Loss	4–7	Jun 2015	Bredeney Ladies Open, Germany	25,000	Clay	(Germany) Carolin Daniels	(Germany) Nicola Geuer (Switzerland) Viktorija Golubic	3–6, 3–6
Loss	4–8	Jun 2015	ITF Lenzerheide, Switzerland	25,000	Clay	(Switzerland) Xenia Knoll	(Spain) Yvonne Cavallé Reimers (Switzerland) Karin Kennel	w/o
Win	5–8	Feb 2016	ITF Kreuzlingen, Switzerland	50,000	Carpet (i)	(Switzerland) Amra Sadiković	(Croatia) Tena Lukas (United States) Bernarda Pera	5–7, 6–2, [10–5]
Win	6–8	Apr 2016	Chiasso Open, Switzerland	25,000	Clay	(Germany) Anne Schäfer	(Poland) Olga Brózda (Poland) Katarzyna Kawa	6–1, 6–1

== Wins over top-10 players ==
#	Player	Rank	Event	Surface	Rd	Score	Rank
2017
1.	(Slovakia) Dominika Cibulková	No. 6	Rosmalen Championships, Netherlands	Grass	1R	7–5, 2–6, 6–4	No. 161
