= Katharina Hobgarski =

German tennis player

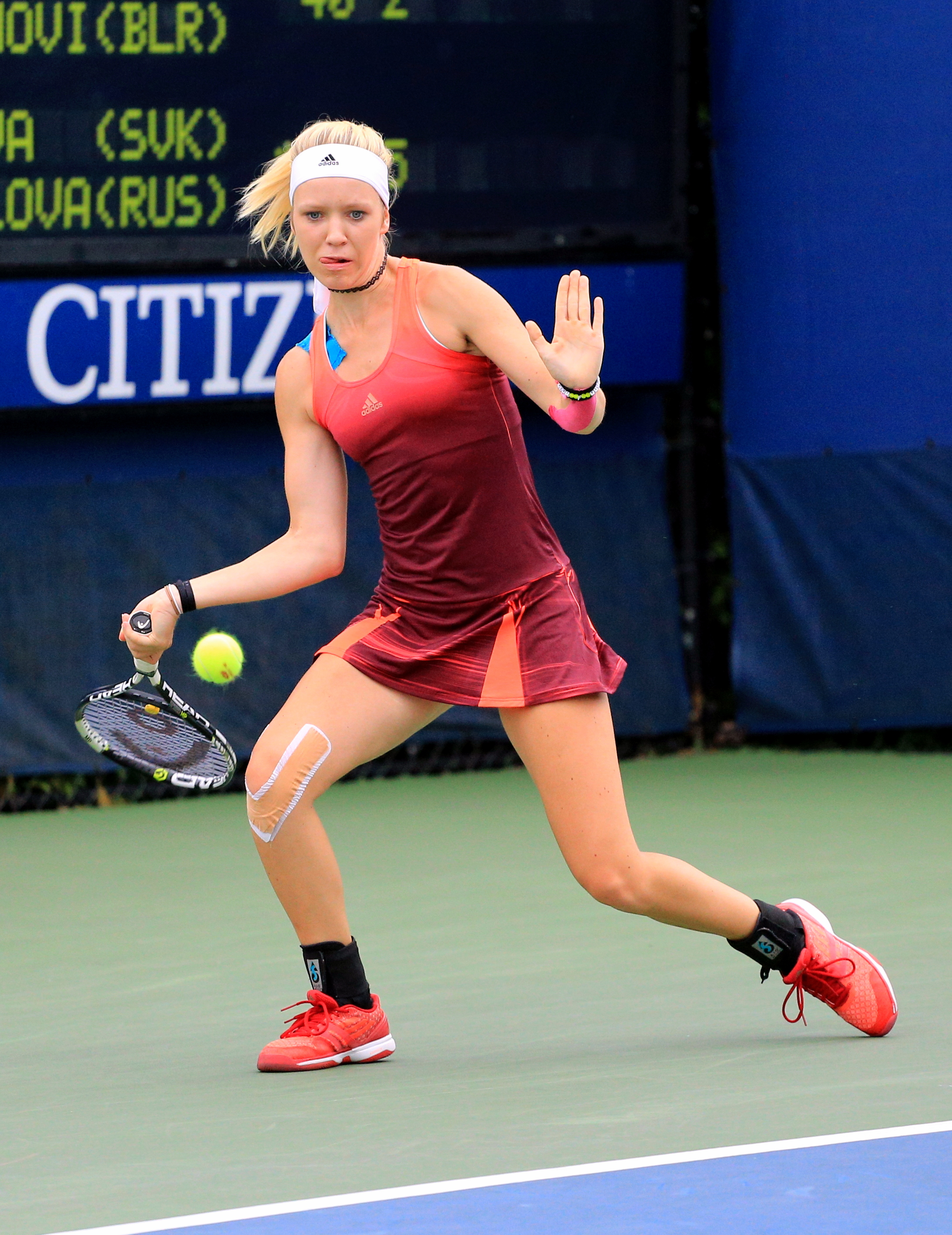
- Hobgarski at the 2015 US Open
- Country (sports): Germany
- Born: 18 June 1997 (age 29) Neunkirchen, Germany
- Height: 1.71 m (5 ft 7 in)
- Prize money: $315,190

Singles
- Career record: 383–209
- Career titles: 19 ITF
- Highest ranking: No. 189 (9 January 2023)
- Current ranking: No. 671 (28 September 2026)

Grand Slam singles results
- Australian Open: Q1 (2022, 2023)
- French Open: Q1 (2023)
- US Open: Q2 (2019)

Doubles
- Career record: 180–97
- Career titles: 25 ITF
- Highest ranking: No. 244 (29 July 2024)
- Current ranking: No. 744 (28 September 2026)
- Last updated on: 1 October 2026.

Katharina Hobgarski (born 18 June 1997) is a German tennis player.

So far, she has won 19 singles titles and 25 doubles titles on the ITF Circuit. On 9 January 2023, she reached her best singles ranking of world No. 189. On 29 July 2024, she peaked at No. 244 in the WTA doubles rankings.

In May 2016, Hobgarski was awarded a wildcard for the main draw of the Nuremberg Cup.

== Singles performance timeline ==
Key
W	F	SF	QF	#R	RR	Q#	DNQ	A	NH

(W) winner; (F) finalist; (SF) semifinalist; (QF) quarterfinalist; (#R) rounds 4, 3, 2, 1; (RR) round-robin stage; (Q#) qualification round; (DNQ) did not qualify; (A) absent; (NH) not held; (SR) strike rate (events won / competed); (W–L) win–loss record.
To avoid confusion and double counting, these charts are updated at the conclusion of a tournament or when the player's participation has ended.

Only main-draw results in WTA Tour (incl. Grand Slam tournaments) are included in win–loss records.

Tournament	2016	2017	2018	2019	2020	2021	2022	2023	W–L
Grand Slam tournaments
Australian Open	A	A	A	A	A	A	Q1	Q1	0–0
French Open	A	A	A	A	A	A	A	Q1	0–0
Wimbledon	A	A	A	A	NH	A	A	A	0–0
US Open	A	Q1	A	Q2	A	A	A	A	0–0
Career statistics
Tournaments	1	1	1	0	0	0	1	0	4
Overall win–loss	0–1	0–1	0–1	0–0	0–0	0–0	0–1	0–0	0–4
Year-end ranking	382	249	257	227	265	327	205	344	

== ITF Circuit finals ==
=== Singles: 33 (19 titles, 14 runner-ups) ===
Legend W60 tournaments (0–2) W25/35 tournaments (10–9) W10/15 tournaments (9–3)	Finals by surface Hard (1–2) Clay (18–12)

Result	W–L	Date	Tournament	Tier	Surface	Opponent	Score
Loss	0–1	Nov 2015	ITF Port El Kantaoui, Tunisia	W10	Hard	(Ukraine) Valeriya Strakhova	6–7^{(3–7)}, 0–3 ret.
Win	1–1	Jun 2016	ITF Kaltenkirchen, Germany	W10	Clay	(Germany) Lisa Matviyenko	6–3, 6–3
Win	2–1	Aug 2016	ITF Nuremberg, Germany	W10	Clay	(France) Jade Suvrijn	2–6, 6–0, 6–2
Win	3–1	Sep 2016	ITF Hammamet, Tunisia	W10	Clay	(Chile) Fernanda Brito	6–2, 6–2
Win	4–1	Oct 2016	ITF Hammamet, Tunisia	W10	Clay	(Chile) Fernanda Brito	6–0, 7–5
Win	5–1	Oct 2016	ITF Hammamet, Tunisia	W10	Clay	(Slovakia) Barbara Kötelesová	6–4, 6–2
Win	6–1	Nov 2016	ITF Hammamet, Tunisia	W10	Clay	(Brazil) Carolina Alves	6–0, 6–1
Win	7–1	Nov 2016	ITF Hammamet, Tunisia	W10	Clay	(France) Yasmine Mansouri	6–4, 6–2
Win	8–1	Nov 2016	ITF Hammamet, Tunisia	W10	Clay	(Italy) Gaia Sanesi	6–1, 7–5
Loss	8–2	Mar 2017	ITF Palma Nova, Spain	W15	Clay	(Australia) Isabelle Wallace	6–7^{(4–7)}, 0–6
Win	9–2	Jul 2017	ITF Aschaffenburg, Germany	W25	Clay	(Spain) Yvonne Cavallé Reimers	7–5, 6–4
Loss	9–3	Jun 2018	ITF Hammamet, Tunisia	W15	Clay	(Chile) Fernanda Brito	4–6, 2–6
Loss	9–4	Jul 2018	ITF Aschaffenburg, Germany	W25	Clay	(Germany) Anna Zaja	4–6, 5–7
Loss	9–5	Sep 2018	Sofia Cup, Bulgaria	W25	Clay	(Austria) Barbara Haas	3–6, 2–6
Win	10–5	Sep 2018	ITF Pula, Italy	W25	Clay	(Brazil) Carolina Alves	7–6^{(7–3)}, 6–2
Loss	10–6	Jul 2019	ITF Denain, France	W25	Clay	(Luxembourg) Eléonora Molinaro	4–6, 6–1, 3–6
Loss	10–7	Jul 2019	Reinert Open Versmold, Germany	W60	Clay	(Serbia) Nina Stojanović	0–6, 5–7
Loss	10–8	Sep 2019	Meitar Open, Israel	W60	Hard	(Denmark) Clara Tauson	6–4, 3–6, 1–6
Loss	10–9	Feb 2022	ITF Antalya, Turkey	W25	Clay	(China) Wang Yafan	5–7, 3–6
Loss	10–10	Jun 2022	ITF Périgueux, France	W25	Clay	(France) Séléna Janicijevic	3–6, 2–6
Win	11–10	Jul 2022	ITF Stuttgart, Germany	W25	Clay	(Austria) Sinja Kraus	7–5, 6–2
Loss	11–11	Jul 2022	ITF Aschaffenburg, Germany	W25	Clay	(Spain) Jéssica Bouzas Maneiro	1–6, 2–6
Win	12–11	Sep 2022	ITF Pula, Italy	W25	Clay	(Italy) Camilla Rosatello	6–1, 6–1
Win	13–11	Sep 2023	ITF Pula, Italy	W25	Clay	(Italy) Federica Bilardo	7–5, 6–3
Loss	13–12	Oct 2023	ITF Pula, Italy	W25	Clay	(Czech Republic) Nikola Bartůňková	0–6, 0–1 ret.
Win	14–12	Apr 2024	ITF Hammamet, Tunisia	W35	Clay	(Italy) Sofia Rocchetti	6–2, 1–6, 6–2
Loss	14–13	Aug 2024	ITF Duffel, Belgium	W35	Clay	(Hungary) Natália Szabanin	6–7^{(3–7)}, 6–3, 0–6
Win	15–13	Jan 2025	ITF Monastir, Tunisia	W15	Hard	(South Korea) Lee Eun-ji	7–5, 6–3
Win	16–13	Jun 2025	ITF Klosters, Switzerland	W35	Clay	Anastasia Gasanova	6–2, 7–6^{(7–2)}
Win	17–13	Jul 2025	Amstelveen Open, Netherlands	W35	Clay	(United States) Louisa Chirico	0–1 ret.
Win	18–13	Sep 2025	ITF Punta Cana, Dominican Republic	W35	Clay	(Argentina) Luisina Giovannini	6–3, 5–7, 6–4
Loss	18–14	Sep 2025	ITF Punta Cana, Dominican Republic	W35	Clay	(Serbia) Katarina Jokić	walkover
Win	19–14	Oct 2025	ITF Pula, Italy	W35	Clay	(Germany) Antonia Schmidt	6–4, 6–1

=== Doubles: 38 (25 titles, 13 runner-ups) ===
Legend W60 tournaments (0–1) W25/35 tournaments (15–11) W10/15 tournaments (10–1)	Finals by surface Hard (4–2) Clay (21–10) Carpet (0–1)

Result	W–L	Date	Tournament	Tier	Surface	Partner	Opponents	Score
Win	1–0	Apr 2016	ITF Hammamet, Tunisia	W10	Clay	(Romania) Elena Gabriela Ruse	(Egypt) Ola Abou Zekry (India) Snehadevi Reddy	6–4, 6–4
Win	2–0	Jun 2016	ITF Braunschweig, Germany	W25	Clay	(Germany) Katharina Gerlach	(Bosnia and Herzegovina) Anita Wagner (Serbia) Nina Stojanović	6–4, 6–3
Win	3–0	Jun 2016	ITF Kaltenkirchen, Germany	W10	Clay	(Germany) Julia Lohoff	(Hungary) Bianka Békefi (Ecuador) Charlotte Römer	6–4, 6–2
Win	4–0	Aug 2016	ITF Rebecq, Belgium	W10	Clay	(United Kingdom) Emily Arbuthnott	(Poland) Justyna Jegiołka (United States) Chiara Scholl	6–1, 6–1
Loss	4–1	Aug 2016	ITF Nuremberg, Germany	W10	Clay	(Bosnia and Herzegovina) Anita Wagner	(United States) Dasha Ivanova (Czech Republic) Petra Krejsová	7–5, 1–6, [8–10]
Win	5–1	Feb 2017	ITF Palma Nova, Spain	W15	Clay	(Germany) Katharina Gerlach	(Spain) Yvonne Cavallé Reimers (Spain) Olga Sáez Larra	6–4, 6–4
Win	6–1	Jul 2017	ITF Aschaffenburg, Germany	W25	Clay	(Germany) Julia Lohoff	(United States) Yuki Kristina Chiang (Germany) Lisa Ponomar	6–3, 2–6, [10–3]
Loss	6–2	Sep 2018	ITF Pula, Italy	W25	Clay	(United Kingdom) Emily Arbuthnott	(Italy) Martina Colmegna (Italy) Federica di Sarra	6–7^{(0–7)}, 2–6
Win	7–2	Apr 2019	ITF Pula, Italy	W25	Clay	(Ukraine) Valeriya Strakhova	(Italy) Giorgia Marchetti (Italy) Camilla Rosatello	6–2, 6–7^{(4–7)}, [13–11]
Win	8–2	Jun 2019	ITF Darmstadt, Germany	W25	Clay	(Germany) Vivian Heisen	(Germany) Lena Lutzeier (Germany) Natalia Siedliska	6–7^{(4–7)}, 6–2, [10–4]
Win	9–2	Aug 2019	ITF Vienna, Austria	W25	Clay	(Germany) Vivian Heisen	(Spain) Irene Burillo (Spain) Andrea Lázaro García	7–6^{(7–4)}, 6–4
Win	10–2	Sep 2019	ITF Roehampton, United Kingdom	W25	Hard	(Germany) Vivian Heisen	(United States) Maria Sanchez (United Kingdom) Freya Christie	7–5, 1–6, [10–7]
Win	11–2	May 2021	ITF Antalya, Turkey	W15	Clay	(Switzerland) Ylena In-Albon	(Netherlands) Eva Vedder (Netherlands) Stéphanie Visscher	6–3, 6–3
Win	12–2	Aug 2021	ITF Braunschweig, Germany	W25	Clay	(Ukraine) Valeriya Strakhova	(Austria) Tamira Paszek (United States) Chiara Scholl	3–6, 6–2, [12–10]
Win	13–2	Feb 2022	ITF Antalya, Turkey	W15	Clay	(Croatia) Mariana Dražić	(Italy) Angelica Moratelli (Hungary) Amarissa Tóth	7–5, 6–4
Win	14–2	Jun 2022	ITF Denain, France	W25	Clay	(Ukraine) Valeriya Strakhova	(Latvia) Kamilla Bartone (Bosnia and Herzegovina) Anita Wagner	6–0, 6–4
Loss	14–3	Aug 2023	Ladies Open Hechingen, Germany	W60	Clay	(Georgia (country)) Ekaterine Gorgodze	Alena Fomina-Klotz (North Macedonia) Lina Gjorcheska	2–6, 4–6
Win	15–3	Sep 2023	ITF Pula, Italy	W25	Clay	(Slovenia) Živa Falkner	(France) Yasmine Mansouri (Italy) Miriana Tona	6–1, 6–2
Win	16–3	Sep 2023	ITF Pula, Italy	W25	Clay	(Georgia (country)) Ekaterine Gorgodze	(Spain) Yvonne Cavallé Reimers (Italy) Aurora Zantedeschi	6–2, 6–4
Loss	16–4	Oct 2023	ITF Pula, Italy	W25	Clay	(Switzerland) Ylena In-Albon	(Italy) Martina Colmegna (Argentina) Guillermina Naya	2–6, 7–6^{(8–6)}, [8–10]
Loss	16–5	Nov 2023	ITF Limassol, Cyprus	W25	Hard	(Spain) Guiomar Maristany	(Czech Republic) Julie Štruplová (Belgium) Hanne Vandewinkel	4–6, 4–6
Loss	16–6	Dec 2023	ITF Monastir, Tunisia	W25	Hard	(Greece) Sapfo Sakellaridi	(Belgium) Magali Kempen (Belgium) Lara Salden	7–6^{(7–5)}, 4–6, [4–10]
Loss	16–7	Feb 2024	ITF Hammamet, Tunisia	W35	Clay	Amina Anshba	(Romania) Oana Gavrilă (Greece) Sapfo Sakellaridi	7–6^{(7–5)}, 5–7, [4–10]
Win	17–7	Mar 2024	ITF Heraklion, Greece	W15	Clay	Polina Leykina	(Italy) Irene Lavino (Greece) Sapfo Sakellaridi	4–6, 6–1, [10–3]
Loss	17–8	Jun 2024	ITF Klosters, Switzerland	W35	Clay	(Germany) Antonia Schmidt	(Switzerland) Jenny Dürst (Slovakia) Nina Vargová	2–6, 6–4, [8–10]
Win	18–8	Aug 2024	ITF Leipzig, Germany	W35	Clay	(Georgia (country)) Ekaterine Gorgodze	(Czech Republic) Denisa Hindová (Czech Republic) Julie Štruplová	6–2, 3–6, [10–8]
Loss	18–9	Sep 2024	ITF Pula, Italy	W35	Clay	(Czech Republic) Julie Štruplová	(Spain) Aliona Bolsova (Netherlands) Eva Vedder	3–6, 3–6
Win	19–9	Nov 2024	ITF Lousada, Portugal	W35	Hard (i)	(Germany) Antonia Schmidt	(United States) Baylen Brown (United States) Jamilah Snells	6–4, 6–2
Win	20–9	Feb 2025	ITF Monastir, Tunisia	W15	Hard	(Italy) Silvia Ambrosio	(Austria) Arabella Koller (Belgium) Eliessa Vanlangendonck	6–3, 6–3
Win	21–9	Mar 2025	ITF Monastir, Tunisia	W15	Hard	(Italy) Silvia Ambrosio	(United States) Julia Adams (United States) Lilian Poling	6–4, 6–7^{(4–7)}, [10–4]
Loss	21–10	Mar 2025	ITF Solarino, Italy	W35	Carpet	(Belgium) Sofia Costoulas	(Slovakia) Viktória Hrunčáková (Slovakia) Katarína Kužmová	7–6^{(7–4)}, 4–6, [5–10]
Win	22–10	Apr 2025	ITF Heraklion, Greece	W15	Clay	(Hungary) Adrienn Nagy	(Bulgaria) Rositsa Dencheva (Germany) Franziska Sziedat	6–1, 6–1
Loss	22–11	Apr 2025	ITF Pula, Italy	W35	Clay	(Germany) Antonia Schmidt	(Japan) Hikaru Sato (Japan) Ikumi Yamazaki	6–7^{(4–7)}, 6–1, [10–12]
Loss	22–12	Aug 2025	ITF Kuršumlijska Banja, Serbia	W35	Clay	(Greece) Martha Matoula	Alexandra Shubladze; Ksenia Zaytseva	2–6, 1–6
Win	23–12	Sep 2025	ITF Punta Cana, Dominican Republic	W35	Clay	(Poland) Weronika Falkowska	(Italy) Anastasia Abbagnato (Netherlands) Stéphanie Visscher	6–2, 7–5
Win	24–12	Sep 2025	ITF Punta Cana, Dominican Republic	W35	Clay	(Poland) Weronika Falkowska	(Poland) Zuzanna Pawlikowska (Ecuador) Camila Romero	6–2, 7–5
Win	25–12	Oct 2025	ITF Pula, Italy	W35	Clay	(Sweden) Lisa Zaar	(Morocco) Yasmine Kabbaj (France) Mathilde Lollia	6–3, 6–4
Loss	25–13	Mar 2026	ITF Heraklion, Greece	W35	Clay	(Slovakia) Nina Vargová	(Morocco) Yasmine Kabbaj (Ukraine) Nadiia Kolb	2–6, 1–6

== Junior Grand Slam tournament finals ==
=== Doubles: 1 (runner-up) ===
Result	Year	Tournament	Surface	Partner	Opponents	Score
Loss	2015	Australian Open	Hard	(Belgium) Greet Minnen	(Czech Republic) Miriam Kolodziejová (Czech Republic) Markéta Vondroušová	5–7, 4–6
