= Katharina Gerlach =

German tennis player

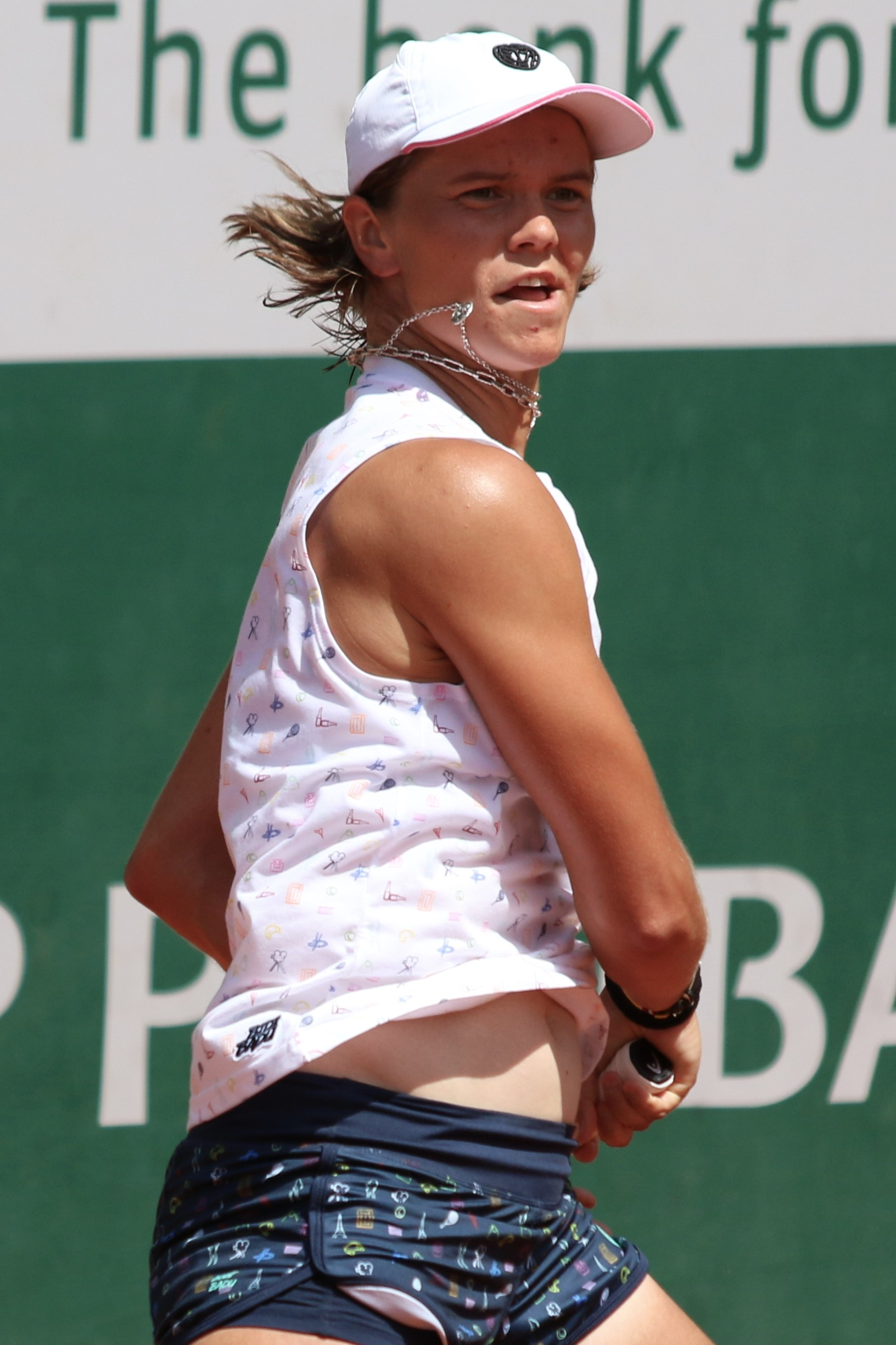
- Gerlach at the 2022 French Open
- Country (sports): Germany
- Born: 19 February 1998 (age 27); Essen, Germany
- Plays: Right-handed (one-handed backhand)
- Prize money: US$285,372

Singles
- Career record: 204–181
- Career titles: 4 ITF
- Highest ranking: No. 217 (25 April 2022)

Grand Slam singles results
- Australian Open: Q2 (2021)
- French Open: Q2 (2022)
- Wimbledon: Q1 (2021, 2022)
- US Open: Q1 (2021, 2022)

Doubles
- Career record: 93–82
- Career titles: 7 ITF
- Highest ranking: No. 238 (2 July 2018)
- Last updated on: 15 November 2023.

Katharina Gerlach (born 19 February 1998) is a German inactive tennis player.

She has won four singles and seven doubles titles on the ITF Circuit. On 25 April 2022, she reached her best singles ranking of world No. 217. On 2 July 2018, she peaked at No. 238 in the doubles rankings.

Gerlach made her WTA Tour debut at the 2015 Nürnberger Versicherungscup, partnering Lena Rüffer in doubles. They lost in the first round to eventual tournament champions, Chan Hao-ching and Anabel Medina Garrigues.

== Performance timelines ==
Key
W	F	SF	QF	#R	RR	Q#	DNQ	A	NH

(W) winner; (F) finalist; (SF) semifinalist; (QF) quarterfinalist; (#R) rounds 4, 3, 2, 1; (RR) round-robin stage; (Q#) qualification round; (DNQ) did not qualify; (A) absent; (NH) not held; (SR) strike rate (events won / competed); (W–L) win–loss record.
To avoid confusion and double counting, these charts are updated at the conclusion of a tournament or when the player's participation has ended.

Only main-draw results in WTA Tour are included in win–loss records.

=== Singles ===
Current through the 2023 WTA Tour.

Tournament	2016	2017	2018	2019	2020	2021	2022	2023	SR	W–L
Grand Slam tournaments
Australian Open	A	A	A	A	A	Q2	Q1	A	0 / 0	0–0
French Open	A	A	A	A	A	A	Q2	A	0 / 0	0–0
Wimbledon	A	A	A	A	A	Q1	Q1	A	0 / 0	0–0
US Open	A	A	A	A	A	Q1	Q1	A	0 / 0	0–0
Win–loss	0–0	0–0	0–0	0–0	0–0	0–0	0–0	0–0	0 / 0	0–0
Career statistics
Tournaments	1	1	0	0	0	1	0	0	3	
Overall win–loss	0–1	0–1	0–0	0–0	0–0	0–1	0–0	0–0	0–3	
Year-end ranking	599	385	355	244	245	223	399	–		

== ITF Circuit finals ==
=== Singles: 13 (4 titles, 9 runner–ups) ===
Legend $100,000 tournaments (0–0) $80,000 tournaments (0–0) $60,000 tournaments (0–0) $25,000 tournaments (1–7) $10/15,000 tournaments (3–2)	Finals by surface Hard (0–0) Clay (4–9) Grass (0–0) Carpet (0–0)

Result	W–L	Date	Tournament	Tier	Surface	Opponent	Score
Loss	0–1	Aug 2015	ITF Vienna, Austria	10,000	Clay	(Austria) Julia Grabher	3–6, 6–3, 1–6
Win	1–1	Sep 2016	ITF Říčany, Czech Republic	10,000	Clay	(Czech Republic) Miriam Kolodziejová	7–5, 6–2
Loss	1–2	Jan 2017	ITF Hammamet, Tunisia	15,000	Clay	(Romania) Cristina Dinu	2–6, 1–6
Win	2–2	Jun 2017	ITF Kaltenkirchen, Germany	15,000	Clay	(Belgium) Magali Kempen	6–4, 7–6^{(7–2)}
Win	3–2	Sep 2017	ITF Badenweiler, Germany	15,000	Clay	(France) Priscilla Heise	6–4, 2–6, 6–4
Loss	3–3	Jul 2018	ITF Darmstadt, Germany	25,000	Clay	(Spain) Aliona Bolsova	2–6, 1–6
Win	4–3	Jul 2018	ITF Horb, Germany	25,000	Clay	(Poland) Katarzyna Piter	4–6, 6–3, 7–6^{(7–4)}
Loss	4–4	Aug 2019	ITF Bad Saulgau, Germany	25,000	Clay	(Spain) Sara Sorribes Tormo	6–7^{(4–7)}, 1–6
Loss	4–5	Aug 2019	ITF Leipzig, Germany	25,000	Clay	(Germany) Jule Niemeier	3–6, 3–6
Loss	4–6	Aug 2019	ITF Braunschweig, Germany	25,000	Clay	(Turkey) Çağla Büyükakçay	4–6, 2–6
Loss	4–7	Sep 2019	ITF Frýdek-Místek, Czech Republic	25,000	Clay	(Georgia (country)) Ekaterine Gorgodze	1–6, 6–7^{(6–8)}
Loss	4–8	Oct 2021	ITF Lima, Peru	25,000	Clay	(Bosnia and Herzegovina) Dea Herdželaš	2–6, 2–6
Loss	4–9	Oct 2021	ITF Guayaquil, Ecuador	25,000	Clay	(Brazil) Laura Pigossi	0–6, 2–6

=== Doubles: 11 (7 titles, 4 runner–ups) ===
Legend $100,000 tournaments (0–0) $80,000 tournaments (0–1) $60,000 tournaments (1–1) $25,000 tournaments (4–1) $15,000 tournaments (2–1)	Finals by surface Hard (0–0) Clay (7–4) Grass (0–0) Carpet (0–0)

Result	W–L	Date	Tournament	Tier	Surface	Partner	Opponents	Score
Win	1–0	Jun 2016	ITF Braunschweig, Germany	25,000	Clay	(Germany) Katharina Hobgarski	(Bosnia and Herzegovina) Anita Husarić (Serbia) Nina Stojanović	6–4, 6–3
Win	1–0	Feb 2017	ITF Palma Nova, Spain	15,000	Clay	(Germany) Katharina Hobgarski	(Spain) Yvonne Cavallé Reimers (Spain) Olga Sáez Larra	6–4, 6–4
Win	3–0	Jul 2017	ITF Versmold, Germany	60,000	Clay	(Germany) Julia Lohoff	(Japan) Misa Eguchi (Japan) Akiko Omae	4–6, 6–1, [10–7]
Loss	3–1	Mar 2018	ITF Palma Nova, Spain	15,000	Clay	(Germany) Lena Rüffer	(Japan) Yukina Saigo (Japan) Aiko Yoshitomi	4–6, 2–6
Loss	3–2	Mar 2018	ITF Pula, Italy	25,000	Clay	(Germany) Lena Rüffer	(Georgia (country)) Ekaterine Gorgodze (Georgia (country)) Sofia Shapatava	4–6, 6–7^{(5–7)}
Win	4–2	Jun 2018	ITF Essen, Germany	25,000	Clay	(Germany) Julia Lohoff	(Latvia) Diana Marcinkevica (South Africa) Chanel Simmonds	6–4, 2–6, [10–6]
Win	5–2	Jun 2018	ITF Kaltenkirchen, Germany	15,000	Clay	(Germany) Anna Gabric	(Israel) Vlada Katic (Belarus) Sviatlana Pirazhenka	6–2, 5–7, [10–8]
Win	6–2	Jul 2019	ITF Horb, Germany	25,000	Clay	(Germany) Julia Lohoff	(Uzbekistan) Albina Khabibulina (Georgia (country)) Sofia Shapatava	6–1, 6–3
Win	7–2	Oct 2021	ITF Rio do Sul, Brazil	25,000	Clay	(Chile) Daniela Seguel	(Chile) Bárbara Gatica (Brazil) Rebeca Pereira	7–6^{(10–8)}, 6–3
Loss	7–3	Nov 2021	ITF Santiago, Chile	60,000	Clay	(Chile) Daniela Seguel	(Netherlands) Arianne Hartono (Australia) Olivia Tjandramulia	1–6, 3–6
Loss	7–4	Apr 2022	ITF Oeiras, Portugal	80,000	Clay	(Serbia) Natalija Stevanović	(Poland) Katarzyna Piter (Belgium) Kimberley Zimmermann	1–6, 1–6
