= 2013 French Open – Men's singles qualifying =

Men's singles qualifying
- 2013 French Open

Events
Singles	men	women		boys	girls
Doubles	men	women	mixed	boys	girls
WC Singles	men	women	quad
WC Doubles	men	women	quad
Legends	−45	45+	women

Qualification
Singles	men	women
- French Open

This article displays the qualifying draw for men's singles at the 2013 French Open.

== Seeds ==
1. (Russia) Alex Bogomolov Jr. (second round)
2. (Canada) Vasek Pospisil (qualified)
3. (Belgium) Steve Darcis (qualified)
4. (Austria) Andreas Haider-Maurer (qualifying competition, lucky loser)
5. (Romania) Adrian Ungur (qualifying competition)
6. (Portugal) Gastão Elias (second round)
7. (Italy) Filippo Volandri (second round)
8. (United States) Wayne Odesnik (qualifying competition)
9. (Brazil) João Souza (second round)
10. (United States) Tim Smyczek (first round)
11. (United States) Denis Kudla (qualified)
12. (Germany) Jan-Lennard Struff (qualified)
13. (United States) Jack Sock (qualified)
14. (Ukraine) Illya Marchenko (qualifying competition, lucky loser)
15. (United States) Rhyne Williams (qualifying competition, lucky loser)
16. (Australia) Matthew Ebden (second round)
17. (Czech Republic) Jiří Veselý (qualified)
18. (Germany) Matthias Bachinger (second round)
19. (Argentina) Diego Sebastián Schwartzman (second round)
20. (United States) Steve Johnson (qualified)
21. (Italy) Matteo Viola (first round)
22. (Poland) Michał Przysiężny (qualified)
23. (Romania) Marius Copil (first round)
24. (Germany) Michael Berrer (second round)
25. (Italy) Flavio Cipolla (second round)
26. (Germany) Simon Greul (qualifying competition)
27. (Germany) Mischa Zverev (first round)
28. (Russia) Teymuraz Gabashvili (qualifying competition)
29. (Spain) Daniel Muñoz de la Nava (qualified)
30. (Belgium) Ruben Bemelmans (second round)
31. (Japan) Tatsuma Ito (first round)
32. (Colombia) Alejandro González (first round)

== Qualifiers ==
1. (Czech Republic) Jiří Veselý
2. (Canada) Vasek Pospisil
3. (Belgium) Steve Darcis
4. (Spain) Pere Riba
5. (United States) Steve Johnson
6. (Germany) Andreas Beck
7. (Germany) Julian Reister
8. (India) Somdev Devvarman
9. (Spain) Pablo Carreño-Busta
10. (France) Maxime Teixeira
11. (United States) Denis Kudla
12. (Germany) Jan-Lennard Struff
13. (United States) Jack Sock
14. (Spain) Daniel Muñoz de la Nava
15. (Poland) Michał Przysiężny
16. (Australia) James Duckworth

== Lucky losers ==
1. (Austria) Andreas Haider-Maurer
2. (Ukraine) Illya Marchenko
3. (United States) Rhyne Williams

== Qualifying draw ==
Key

- Q = Qualifier
- WC = Wild card
- LL = Lucky loser
- Alt = Alternate
- ITF = ITF entry
- PR = Protected ranking
- SR = Special ranking
- SE = Special exempt
- JE = Junior exempt
- JR = Junior Accelerator Programme entrant
- CO = College Accelerator Programme entrant
- NG = Next Gen Accelerator Program entrant
- w/o = Walkover
- r = Retired
- d = Defaulted

=== First qualifier ===
First round
1	(Russia) Alex Bogomolov Jr.	7^{7}	6
(Italy) Alessio di Mauro	6^{4}	1
(France) Stéphane Robert	6	4	7
PR	(Russia) Igor Andreev	1	6	5
(Bosnia and Herzegovina) Mirza Bašić	6	3	7
(Tunisia) Malek Jaziri	0	6	9
(Ukraine) Denys Molchanov	6^{7}	2
17	(Czech Republic) Jiří Veselý	7^{9}	6

Second round
1	(Russia) Alex Bogomolov Jr.	3	4
(France) Stéphane Robert	6	6
(Tunisia) Malek Jaziri	3	3
17	(Czech Republic) Jiří Veselý	6	6

Qualifying competition
(France) Stéphane Robert	2	2
17	(Czech Republic) Jiří Veselý	6	6

=== Second qualifier ===
First round
2	(Canada) Vasek Pospisil	6	6
WC	(France) Johan-Sébastien Tatlot	2	4
PR	(Argentina) Eduardo Schwank	2	3
(Czech Republic) Dušan Lojda	6	6
(Spain) Adrián Menéndez-Maceiras	3	6^{5}
(Canada) Frank Dancevic	6	7^{7}
WC	(France) Calvin Hemery	1	2
18	(Germany) Matthias Bachinger	6	6

Second round
2	(Canada) Vasek Pospisil	7	7^{7}
(Czech Republic) Dušan Lojda	5	6^{1}
(Canada) Frank Dancevic	6	1	6
18	(Germany) Matthias Bachinger	4	6	2

Qualifying competition
2	(Canada) Vasek Pospisil	6	6
(Canada) Frank Dancevic	2	0

=== Third qualifier ===
First round
3	(Belgium) Steve Darcis	6	6
(Romania) Victor Crivoi	3	2
(Slovakia) Jozef Kovalík	6	6
(Spain) Iñigo Cervantes Huegun	2	3
(France) Pierre-Hugues Herbert	7^{9}	6
(Brazil) Leonardo Kirche	6^{7}	3
(France) Josselin Ouanna	4	4
26	(Germany) Simon Greul	6	6

Second round
3	(Belgium) Steve Darcis	6	7
(Slovakia) Jozef Kovalík	3	5
(France) Pierre-Hugues Herbert	6	5	2
26	(Germany) Simon Greul	4	7	6

Qualifying competition
3	(Belgium) Steve Darcis	7	6
26	(Germany) Simon Greul	5	3

=== Fourth qualifier ===
First round
4	(Austria) Andreas Haider-Maurer	1	7	9
(Czech Republic) Jan Mertl	6	5	7
(United States) Bradley Klahn	3	5
(Argentina) Agustín Velotti	6	7
(Portugal) Pedro Sousa	3	1
PR	(Spain) Pere Riba	6	6
(United States) Tennys Sandgren	4	7	7
30	(Belgium) Ruben Bemelmans	6	5	9

Second round
4	(Austria) Andreas Haider-Maurer	6	6
(Argentina) Agustín Velotti	1	4
PR	(Spain) Pere Riba	7^{7}	6
30	(Belgium) Ruben Bemelmans	6^{1}	2

Qualifying competition
4	(Austria) Andreas Haider-Maurer	4	6^{4}
PR	(Spain) Pere Riba	6	7^{7}

=== Fifth qualifier ===
First round
5	(Romania) Adrian Ungur	6	6
(Slovakia) Andrej Martin	3	3
(Chinese Taipei) Chen Ti	1	3
(Israel) Amir Weintraub	6	6
(Australia) Matthew Barton	2	3
(China) Wu Di	6	6
(Turkey) Marsel İlhan	6	1	2
20	(United States) Steve Johnson	3	6	6

Second round
5	(Romania) Adrian Ungur	1	6	6
(Israel) Amir Weintraub	6	3	4
(China) Wu Di	1	3
20	(United States) Steve Johnson	6	6

Qualifying competition
5	(Romania) Adrian Ungur	3	4
20	(United States) Steve Johnson	6	6

=== Sixth qualifier ===
First round
6	(Portugal) Gastão Elias	6	6
(Japan) Hiroki Moriya	3	3
(Germany) Peter Gojowczyk	7	3	4
(Croatia) Antonio Veić	5	6	6
(Italy) Gianluca Naso	4	4
(Australia) Matt Reid	6	6
PR	(Germany) Andreas Beck	7^{7}	6
32	(Colombia) Alejandro González	6^{4}	3

Second round
6	(Portugal) Gastão Elias	4	3
(Croatia) Antonio Veić	6	6
(Australia) Matt Reid	6^{3}	3
PR	(Germany) Andreas Beck	7^{7}	6

Qualifying competition
(Croatia) Antonio Veić	1	6^{3}
PR	(Germany) Andreas Beck	6	7^{7}

=== Seventh qualifier ===
First round
7	(Italy) Filippo Volandri	6	6
(Argentina) Facundo Bagnis	2	3
(Bosnia and Herzegovina) Aldin Šetkić	2	5
(Germany) Julian Reister	6	7
(Australia) Samuel Groth	6	4	4
(Uzbekistan) Farrukh Dustov	1	6	6
(Netherlands) Jesse Huta Galung	6	6
27	(Germany) Mischa Zverev	1	2

Second round
7	(Italy) Filippo Volandri	5	4
(Germany) Julian Reister	7	6
(Uzbekistan) Farrukh Dustov	7^{7}	6
(Netherlands) Jesse Huta Galung	6^{2}	3

Qualifying competition
(Germany) Julian Reister	6	6
(Uzbekistan) Farrukh Dustov	1	4

=== Eighth qualifier ===
First round
8	(United States) Wayne Odesnik	6	6
(Argentina) Marco Trungelliti	4	4
(Ukraine) Ivan Sergeyev	4	2
(Germany) Cedrik-Marcel Stebe	6	6
WC	(France) Quentin Halys	6	6
(Chinese Taipei) Jimmy Wang	3	4
(India) Somdev Devvarman	6	1	6
21	(Italy) Matteo Viola	4	6	4

Second round
8	(United States) Wayne Odesnik	3	7^{7}	6
(Germany) Cedrik-Marcel Stebe	6	6^{2}	3
WC	(France) Quentin Halys	6^{4}	3
(India) Somdev Devvarman	7^{7}	6

Qualifying competition
8	(United States) Wayne Odesnik	3	4
(India) Somdev Devvarman	6	6

=== Ninth qualifier ===
First round
9	(Brazil) João Souza	6	6
(Thailand) Danai Udomchoke	1	2
(Germany) Dominik Meffert	6^{9}	5
PR	(Spain) Pablo Carreño-Busta	7^{11}	7
(Spain) Javier Martí	6	1
(Serbia) Boris Pašanski	1	0^{r}
(France) Vincent Millot	6	3	8
31	(Japan) Tatsuma Ito	4	6	6

Second round
9	(Brazil) João Souza	1	6	1
PR	(Spain) Pablo Carreño-Busta	6	2	6
(Spain) Javier Martí	6^{4}	3
(France) Vincent Millot	7^{7}	6

Qualifying competition
PR	(Spain) Pablo Carreño-Busta	6	6
(France) Vincent Millot	0	4

=== Tenth qualifier ===
First round
10	(United States) Tim Smyczek	2	5
(Chile) Paul Capdeville	6	7
(Brazil) Guilherme Clezar	6	6^{7}	6
(Slovakia) Pavol Červenák	3	7^{9}	8
WC	(France) Maxime Teixeira	6	6
(France) David Guez	2	3
(United States) Robby Ginepri	3	1
25	(Italy) Flavio Cipolla	6	6

Second round
(Chile) Paul Capdeville	6	6^{3}	3
(Slovakia) Pavol Červenák	4	7^{7}	6
WC	(France) Maxime Teixeira	4	6	6
25	(Italy) Flavio Cipolla	6	4	3

Qualifying competition
(Slovakia) Pavol Červenák	6	2	3
WC	(France) Maxime Teixeira	3	6	6

=== Eleventh qualifier ===
First round
11	(United States) Denis Kudla	6	6
(Canada) Steven Diez	3	2
(Canada) Peter Polansky	6	6
(Kazakhstan) Andrey Golubev	3	3
WC	(France) Axel Michon	4	6	6
PR	(France) Laurent Rochette	6	4	3
(Belgium) Arthur De Greef	6	7
23	(Romania) Marius Copil	4	5

Second round
11	(United States) Denis Kudla	6	3	15
(Canada) Peter Polansky	4	6	13
WC	(France) Axel Michon	2	1
(Belgium) Arthur De Greef	6	6

Qualifying competition
11	(United States) Denis Kudla	7^{7}	6^{3}	6
(Belgium) Arthur De Greef	6^{5}	7^{7}	2

=== Twelfth qualifier ===
First round
12	(Germany) Jan-Lennard Struff	6	6
(Austria) Gerald Melzer	4	3
PR	(France) Albano Olivetti	5	1
(Ecuador) Julio César Campozano	7	6
(Belarus) Uladzimir Ignatik	5	1
(Kazakhstan) Mikhail Kukushkin	7	6
(France) Jonathan Dasnières de Veigy	5	7^{10}	2
28	(Russia) Teymuraz Gabashvili	7	6^{8}	6

Second round
12	(Germany) Jan-Lennard Struff	6	6
(Ecuador) Julio César Campozano	3	3
(Kazakhstan) Mikhail Kukushkin	6	3	4
28	(Russia) Teymuraz Gabashvili	2	6	6

Qualifying competition
12	(Germany) Jan-Lennard Struff	6	7^{9}
28	(Russia) Teymuraz Gabashvili	3	6^{7}

=== Thirteenth qualifier ===
First round
13	(United States) Jack Sock	6	6
(Belgium) Maxime Authom	4	2
(Spain) Sergio Gutiérrez-Ferrol	2	7	5
(Argentina) Renzo Olivo	6	5	7
(Ukraine) Oleksandr Nedovyesov	3	4
(Argentina) Facundo Argüello	6	6
(Russia) Igor Kunitsyn	2	4
24	(Germany) Michael Berrer	6	6

Second round
13	(United States) Jack Sock	7	6
(Argentina) Renzo Olivo	5	4
(Argentina) Facundo Argüello	6	7
24	(Germany) Michael Berrer	3	5

Qualifying competition
13	(United States) Jack Sock	6	6
(Argentina) Facundo Argüello	2	3

=== Fourteenth qualifier ===
First round
14	(Ukraine) Illya Marchenko	7^{7}	2	6
(France) Nicolas Renavand	6^{3}	6	0
WC	(France) Jonathan Eysseric	6^{3}	6	6
(Belgium) Niels Desein	7^{7}	4	3
(Chile) Jorge Aguilar	6	2	6
(Germany) Bastian Knittel	4	6	4
(Chile) Hans Podlipnik-Castillo	6	6^{5}	1
29	(Spain) Daniel Muñoz de la Nava	2	7^{7}	6

Second round
14	(Ukraine) Illya Marchenko	6	6
WC	(France) Jonathan Eysseric	4	1
(Chile) Jorge Aguilar	1	4
29	(Spain) Daniel Muñoz de la Nava	6	6

Qualifying competition
14	(Ukraine) Illya Marchenko	3	6^{6}
29	(Spain) Daniel Muñoz de la Nava	6	7^{8}

=== Fifteenth qualifier ===
First round
15	(United States) Rhyne Williams	6	3
(Netherlands) Boy Westerhof	2	2^{r}
WC	(France) Mathias Bourgue	7^{9}	6
(United Kingdom) Brydan Klein	6^{7}	3
(Austria) Martin Fischer	6	6
(Croatia) Nikola Mektić	0	0
(Spain) Arnau Brugués-Davi	1	4
22	(Poland) Michał Przysiężny	6	6

Second round
15	(United States) Rhyne Williams	6	6
WC	(France) Mathias Bourgue	4	4
(Austria) Martin Fischer	6	6^{6}	2
22	(Poland) Michał Przysiężny	4	7^{8}	6

Qualifying competition
15	(United States) Rhyne Williams	4	4
22	(Poland) Michał Przysiężny	6	6

=== Sixteenth qualifier ===
First round
16	(Australia) Matthew Ebden	7^{7}	6^{4}	6
(Russia) Konstantin Kravchuk	6^{2}	7^{7}	4
WC	(France) Jules Marie	0	5
(Serbia) Dušan Lajović	6	7
WC	(Australia) Alex Bolt	3	6^{1}
(Australia) James Duckworth	6	7^{7}
(Argentina) Guido Andreozzi	5	2
19	(Argentina) Diego Sebastián Schwartzman	7	6

Second round
16	(Australia) Matthew Ebden	3	1
(Serbia) Dušan Lajović	6	6
(Australia) James Duckworth	6	2	6
19	(Argentina) Diego Sebastián Schwartzman	4	6	2

Qualifying competition
(Serbia) Dušan Lajović	1	4
(Australia) James Duckworth	6	6
