= 2013 French Open – Women's singles qualifying =

Women's singles qualifying
- 2013 French Open

Events
Singles	men	women		boys	girls
Doubles	men	women	mixed	boys	girls
WC Singles	men	women	quad
WC Doubles	men	women	quad
Legends	−45	45+	women

Qualification
Singles	men	women
- French Open

== Seeds ==
1. (Spain) Estrella Cabeza Candela (first round)
2. (Hungary) Tímea Babos (second round)
3. (Austria) Yvonne Meusburger (qualifying competition)
4. (United States) Maria Sanchez (second round)
5. (Argentina) Paula Ormaechea (qualified)
6. (Canada) Sharon Fichman (second round)
7. (Kazakhstan) Sesil Karatantcheva (second round)
8. (Greece) Eleni Daniilidou (second round)
9. (Thailand) Luksika Kumkhum (second round)
10. (Kazakhstan) Galina Voskoboeva (qualified)
11. (Chinese Taipei) Chang Kai-chen (first round)
12. (United States) Jessica Pegula (second round)
13. (Germany) Dinah Pfizenmaier (qualified)
14. (United States) Vania King (qualified)
15. (United States) Julia Cohen (second round)
16. (Brazil) Teliana Pereira (qualifying competition)
17. (Slovenia) Polona Hercog (second round)
18. (Italy) Nastassja Burnett (first round)
19. (Portugal) Michelle Larcher de Brito (first round)
20. (Australia) Anastasia Rodionova (qualifying competition)
21. (United States) Irina Falconi (qualifying competition)
22. (Serbia) Aleksandra Krunić (second round)
23. (Germany) Andrea Petkovic (second round)
24. (Czech Republic) Barbora Záhlavová-Strýcová (qualified)

== Qualifiers ==
1. (Czech Republic) Barbora Záhlavová-Strýcová
2. (Colombia) Mariana Duque
3. (United States) Vania King
4. (Ukraine) Yuliya Beygelzimer
5. (Argentina) Paula Ormaechea
6. (United States) Grace Min
7. (Slovakia) Anna Karolína Schmiedlová
8. (Germany) Dinah Pfizenmaier
9. (Czech Republic) Sandra Záhlavová
10. (Kazakhstan) Galina Voskoboeva
11. (Israel) Julia Glushko
12. (Slovakia) Zuzana Kučová

== Qualifying draw ==
Key

- Q = Qualifier
- WC = Wild card
- LL = Lucky loser
- Alt = Alternate
- ITF = ITF entry
- PR = Protected ranking
- SR = Special ranking
- SE = Special exempt
- JE = Junior exempt
- JR = Junior Accelerator Programme entrant
- CO = College Accelerator Programme entrant
- NG = Next Gen Accelerator Program entrant
- w/o = Walkover
- r = Retired
- d = Defaulted

=== First qualifier ===
First round
1	(Spain) Estrella Cabeza Candela	3	3
(Romania) Andreea Mitu	6	6
(Italy) Maria Elena Camerin	4	4
(Liechtenstein) Stephanie Vogt	6	6
(Russia) Alexandra Panova	7	6
(Romania) Raluca Olaru	5	3
(Australia) Monique Adamczak	1	1
24	(Czech Republic) Barbora Záhlavová-Strýcová	6	6

Second round
(Romania) Andreea Mitu	2	2
(Liechtenstein) Stephanie Vogt	6	6
(Russia) Alexandra Panova	6	5	8
24	(Czech Republic) Barbora Záhlavová-Strýcová	1	7	10

Qualifying competition
(Liechtenstein) Stephanie Vogt	4	4
24	(Czech Republic) Barbora Záhlavová-Strýcová	6	6

=== Second qualifier ===
First round
2	(Hungary) Tímea Babos	6	6
WC	(France) Myrtille Georges	4	4
(Poland) Paula Kania	7	6
(South Africa) Chanel Simmonds	5	4
(Colombia) Mariana Duque	6	6
WC	(France) Irina Ramialison	2	2
(Thailand) Nudnida Luangnam	1	4
22	(Serbia) Aleksandra Krunić	6	6

Second round
2	(Hungary) Tímea Babos	2	6^{5}
(Poland) Paula Kania	6	7^{7}
(Colombia) Mariana Duque	6	1	6
22	(Serbia) Aleksandra Krunić	3	6	0

Qualifying competition
(Poland) Paula Kania	1	2
(Colombia) Mariana Duque	6	6

=== Third qualifier ===
First round
3	(Austria) Yvonne Meusburger	6	6
WC	(France) Séverine Beltrame	2	3
(United States) Madison Brengle	1	4
WC	(France) Alizé Lim	6	6
WC	(France) Manon Arcangioli	1	3
(Ukraine) Olga Savchuk	6	6
(Ukraine) Lyudmyla Kichenok	7^{7}	4	2
14	(United States) Vania King	6^{4}	6	6

Second round
3	(Austria) Yvonne Meusburger	6	5	6
WC	(France) Alizé Lim	2	7	3
(Ukraine) Olga Savchuk	2	3
14	(United States) Vania King	6	6

Qualifying competition
3	(Austria) Yvonne Meusburger	2	6	2
14	(United States) Vania King	6	4	6

=== Fourth qualifier ===
First round
4	(United States) Maria Sanchez	6	2
(Uzbekistan) Akgul Amanmuradova	0	0^{r}
(Colombia) Catalina Castaño	2	4
(Ukraine) Yuliya Beygelzimer	6	6
(Australia) Sacha Jones	1	2
(Canada) Stéphanie Dubois	6	6
WC	(France) Océane Dodin	3	4
16	(Brazil) Teliana Pereira	6	6

Second round
4	(United States) Maria Sanchez	4	1
(Ukraine) Yuliya Beygelzimer	6	6
(Canada) Stéphanie Dubois	3	3
16	(Brazil) Teliana Pereira	6	6

Qualifying competition
(Ukraine) Yuliya Beygelzimer	6	3	6
16	(Brazil) Teliana Pereira	0	6	3

=== Fifth qualifier ===
First round
5	(Argentina) Paula Ormaechea	6	6
(Ukraine) Kateryna Kozlova	3	3
(Argentina) María Irigoyen	4	3
(Slovenia) Tadeja Majerič	6	6
(Bosnia and Herzegovina) Mervana Jugić-Salkić	3	2
(Spain) Arantxa Parra Santonja	6	6
(Turkey) Çağla Büyükakçay	2	6	7
18	(Italy) Nastassja Burnett	6	4	5

Second round
5	(Argentina) Paula Ormaechea	6	6
(Slovenia) Tadeja Majerič	3	3
(Spain) Arantxa Parra Santonja	6	6
(Turkey) Çağla Büyükakçay	1	2

Qualifying competition
5	(Argentina) Paula Ormaechea	6	6
(Spain) Arantxa Parra Santonja	3	2

=== Sixth qualifier ===
First round
6	(Canada) Sharon Fichman	6	7^{8}
(Switzerland) Timea Bacsinszky	3	6^{6}
(United Kingdom) Anne Keothavong	6	3	0
(Czech Republic) Eva Birnerová	3	6	6
(Thailand) Varatchaya Wongteanchai	2	1
(United States) Grace Min	6	6
(Croatia) Ajla Tomljanović	6	1	3
17	(Slovenia) Polona Hercog	3	6	6

Second round
6	(Canada) Sharon Fichman	3	7	0
(Czech Republic) Eva Birnerová	6	5	6
(United States) Grace Min	6	6
17	(Slovenia) Polona Hercog	1	2

Qualifying competition
(Czech Republic) Eva Birnerová	2	4
(United States) Grace Min	6	6

=== Seventh qualifier ===
First round
7	(Kazakhstan) Sesil Karatantcheva	6	6
(United Kingdom) Tara Moore	3	3
(Russia) Valeria Savinykh	2	2
(Russia) Alla Kudryavtseva	6	6
(Japan) Kurumi Nara	7	6
(Japan) Erika Sema	5	2
(Slovakia) Anna Karolína Schmiedlová	6	6
15	(United States) Julia Cohen	1	2

Second round
7	(Kazakhstan) Sesil Karatantcheva	6	4	4
(Russia) Alla Kudryavtseva	3	6	6
(Japan) Kurumi Nara	5	2
(Slovakia) Anna Karolína Schmiedlová	7	6

Qualifying competition
(Russia) Alla Kudryavtseva	5	2
(Slovakia) Anna Karolína Schmiedlová	7	6

=== Eighth qualifier ===
First round
8	(Greece) Eleni Daniilidou	6	6
(Paraguay) Verónica Cepede Royg	4	4
(Russia) Vera Dushevina	7	6
(Japan) Yurika Sema	5	3
(Russia) Irina Khromacheva	6	6
(United States) Alison Riske	1	4
(United States) Chiara Scholl	3	4
13	(Germany) Dinah Pfizenmaier	6	6

Second round
8	(Greece) Eleni Daniilidou	1	3
(Russia) Vera Dushevina	6	6
(Russia) Irina Khromacheva	3	2
13	(Germany) Dinah Pfizenmaier	6	6

Qualifying competition
(Russia) Vera Dushevina	7^{9}	2	4
13	(Germany) Dinah Pfizenmaier	6^{7}	6	6

=== Ninth qualifier ===
First round
9	(Thailand) Luksika Kumkhum	6	6
(Kazakhstan) Zarina Diyas	4	3
(Czech Republic) Sandra Záhlavová	6	6
WC	(France) Amandine Hesse	3	3
WC	(France) Estelle Cascino	3	2
(Russia) Daria Gavrilova	6	6
(Ukraine) Maryna Zanevska	6	6
19	(Portugal) Michelle Larcher de Brito	4	2

Second round
9	(Thailand) Luksika Kumkhum	0	6^{4}
(Czech Republic) Sandra Záhlavová	6	7^{7}
(Russia) Daria Gavrilova	1	6	6
(Ukraine) Maryna Zanevska	6	3	2

Qualifying competition
(Czech Republic) Sandra Záhlavová	7^{7}	6
(Russia) Daria Gavrilova	6^{3}	3

=== Tenth qualifier ===
First round
10	(Kazakhstan) Galina Voskoboeva	6	6
(Italy) Corinna Dentoni	2	3
(United Kingdom) Johanna Konta	6	6
(China) Zheng Saisai	1	3
(China) Wang Qiang	7^{7}	3	1
(China) Zhou Yimiao	6^{2}	6	6
(Ukraine) Nadiya Kichenok	4	4
23	(Germany) Andrea Petkovic	6	6

Second round
10	(Kazakhstan) Galina Voskoboeva	4	6	7
(United Kingdom) Johanna Konta	6	3	5
(China) Zhou Yimiao	6^{1}	7^{7}	6
23	(Germany) Andrea Petkovic	7^{7}	6^{2}	4

Qualifying competition
10	(Kazakhstan) Galina Voskoboeva	6	6
(China) Zhou Yimiao	4	3

=== Eleventh qualifier ===
First round
11	(Chinese Taipei) Chang Kai-chen	3	2
(Israel) Julia Glushko	6	6
(Germany) Carina Witthöft	6	6
(Russia) Ekaterina Bychkova	2	2
(Australia) Olivia Rogowska	7^{7}	6
(Russia) Valeria Solovyeva	6^{2}	2
(Austria) Patricia Mayr-Achleitner	3	6	3
20	(Australia) Anastasia Rodionova	6	2	6

Second round
(Israel) Julia Glushko	6	6
(Germany) Carina Witthöft	3	4
(Australia) Olivia Rogowska	3	2
20	(Australia) Anastasia Rodionova	6	6

Qualifying competition
(Israel) Julia Glushko	6	4	8
20	(Australia) Anastasia Rodionova	3	6	6

=== Twelfth qualifier ===
First round
12	(United States) Jessica Pegula	7^{7}	6
(Germany) Anna-Lena Friedsam	6^{2}	0
(Croatia) Tereza Mrdeža	2	0
PR	(Slovakia) Zuzana Kučová	6	6
(Croatia) Ana Vrljić	6	1	3
(Australia) Casey Dellacqua	3	6	6
(France) Julie Coin	2	2
21	(United States) Irina Falconi	6	6

Second round
12	(United States) Jessica Pegula	6	2	6
PR	(Slovakia) Zuzana Kučová	3	6	8
(Australia) Casey Dellacqua	6	5	5
21	(United States) Irina Falconi	2	7	7

Qualifying competition
PR	(Slovakia) Zuzana Kučová	6	6
21	(United States) Irina Falconi	3	4
