= 2013 French Open – Day-by-day summaries =

== Day 1 (26 May) ==
- Schedule of Play
- Seeds out:
  - Women's Singles: (Russia) Nadia Petrova [11], (United States) Venus Williams [30]

Matches on main courts
Matches on Court Philippe Chatrier (Center Court)
| Event | Winner | Loser | Score |
|---|---|---|---|
| Women's Singles 1st Round | (Serbia) Ana Ivanovic [14] | (Croatia) Petra Martić | 6–1, 3–6, 6–3 |
| Women's Singles 1st Round | (United States) Serena Williams [1] | (Georgia (country)) Anna Tatishvili | 6–0, 6–1 |
| Men's Singles 1st Round | (Switzerland) Roger Federer [2] | (Spain) Pablo Carreño Busta [Q] | 6–2, 6–2, 6–3 |
| Men's Singles 1st Round | (France) Michaël Llodra | (Belgium) Steve Darcis [Q] | 6–4, 4–6, 6–1, 6–4 |
Matches on Court Suzanne Lenglen (Grandstand)
| Event | Winner | Loser | Score |
| Women's Singles 1st Round | (Italy) Sara Errani [5] | (Netherlands) Arantxa Rus | 6–1, 6–2 |
| Men's Singles 1st Round | (France) Gilles Simon [15] | (Australia) Lleyton Hewitt | 3–6, 1–6, 6–4, 6–1, 7–5 |
| Men's Singles 1st Round | (Spain) David Ferrer [4] | (Australia) Marinko Matosevic | 6–4, 6–3, 6–4 |
| Women's Singles 1st Round | (Poland) Urszula Radwańska | (United States) Venus Williams [30] | 7–6^{(7–5)}, 6–7^{(4–7)}, 6–4 |
Matches on Court 1
| Event | Winner | Loser | Score |
| Men's Singles 1st Round | (Canada) Milos Raonic [14] | (Belgium) Xavier Malisse | 6–2, 6–1, 4–6, 6–4 |
| Women's Singles 1st Round | (Ukraine) Yuliya Beygelzimer [Q] | (France) Caroline Garcia [WC] | 6–3, 6–4 |
| Men's Singles 1st Round | (France) Jérémy Chardy [25] | (Germany) Benjamin Becker | 6–4, 6–2, 7–5 |
| Women's Singles 1st Round | (Germany) Sabine Lisicki [32] | (Sweden) Sofia Arvidsson | 6–3, 6–4 |
| Men's Singles 1st Round | (Serbia) Viktor Troicki | (United States) James Blake | 6–4, 6–2, 6–2 |

== Day 2 (27 May) ==
- Schedule of Play
- Seeds out:
  - Men's Singles: (Czech Republic) Tomáš Berdych [5], (Argentina) Juan Mónaco [17], (Spain) Marcel Granollers [31]
  - Women's Singles: (Russia) Ekaterina Makarova [22], (Germany) Julia Görges [24], (Austria) Tamira Paszek [28]

Matches on main courts
Matches on Court Philippe Chatrier (Center Court)
| Event | Winner | Loser | Score |
|---|---|---|---|
| Women's Singles 1st Round | (China) Li Na [6] | (Spain) Anabel Medina Garrigues | 6–3, 6–4 |
| Men's Singles 1st Round | (Spain) Rafael Nadal [3] | (Germany) Daniel Brands | 4–6, 7–6^{(7–4)}, 6–4, 6–3 |
| Men's Singles 1st Round | (France) Gaël Monfils [WC] | (Czech Republic) Tomáš Berdych [5] | 7–6^{(10–8)}, 6–4, 6–7^{(3–7)}, 6–7^{(4–7)}, 7–5 |
Matches on Court Suzanne Lenglen (Grandstand)
| Event | Winner | Loser | Score |
| Women's Singles 1st Round | (Poland) Agnieszka Radwańska [4] | (Israel) Shahar Pe'er | 6–1, 6–1 |
| Men's Singles 1st Round | (France) Jo-Wilfried Tsonga [6] | (Slovenia) Aljaž Bedene | 6–2, 6–2, 6–3 |
| Women's Singles 1st Round | (Denmark) Caroline Wozniacki [10] | (United Kingdom) Laura Robson | 6–3, 6–2 |
| Men's Singles 1st Round | (France) Richard Gasquet [7] | (Ukraine) Sergiy Stakhovsky | 6–1, 6–4, 6–3 |
| Women's Singles 1st Round | (Russia) Maria Sharapova [2] | (Chinese Taipei) Hsieh Su-wei | 6–2, 6–1 |
Matches on Court 1
| Event | Winner | Loser | Score |
| Women's Singles 1st Round | (Italy) Roberta Vinci [15] | (France) Stéphanie Foretz Gacon [WC] | 6–2, 6–1 |
| Men's Singles 1st Round | (France) Julien Benneteau [30] | (Lithuania) Ričardas Berankis | 7–6^{(7–5)}, 6–3, 5–7, 7–6^{(7–5)} |
| Men's Singles 1st Round | (Finland) Jarkko Nieminen | (France) Paul-Henri Mathieu | 6–4, 4–6, 7–6^{(11–9)}, 4–6, 6–2 |

== Day 3 (28 May) ==
- Schedule of Play
- Seeds out:
  - Men's Singles: (Ukraine) Alexandr Dolgopolov [22], (Germany) Florian Mayer [28]
  - Men's Doubles: (India) Mahesh Bhupathi / (India) Rohan Bopanna [4], (Italy) Daniele Bracciali / (Italy) Fabio Fognini [14]

Matches on main courts
Matches on Court Philippe Chatrier (Center Court)
| Event | Winner | Loser | Score |
|---|---|---|---|
| Women's Singles 1st Round | (France) Marion Bartoli [13] | (Belarus) Olga Govortsova | 7–6^{(10–8)}, 4–6, 7–5 |
| Men's Singles 1st Round | (Serbia) Novak Djokovic [1] | (Belgium) David Goffin | 7–6^{(7–5)}, 6–4, 7–5 |
| Men's Singles 1st Round | (France) Nicolas Mahut [WC] vs (Serbia) Janko Tipsarević [8] | | Cancelled |
| Women's Singles 1st Round | (Russia) Elena Vesnina vs (Belarus) Victoria Azarenka [3] | | Cancelled |
Matches on Court Suzanne Lenglen (Grandstand)
| Event | Winner | Loser | Score |
| Men's Singles 1st Round | (Germany) Tommy Haas [12] | (France) Guillaume Rufin | 7–6^{(7–4)}, 6–1, 6–3 |
| Women's Singles 1st Round | (France) Alizé Cornet [31] | (Portugal) Maria João Koehler | 7–5, 6–2 |
| Men's Singles 1st Round | (France) Benoît Paire [24] vs (Cyprus) Marcos Baghdatis | | 3–6, 7–6^{(7–1)}, 4–3, suspended |
| Women's Singles 1st Round | (Czech Republic) Petra Kvitová [7] vs (France) Aravane Rezaï [WC] | | Cancelled |

== Day 4 (29 May) ==
- Schedule of Play
- Seeds out:
  - Women's Singles: (Denmark) Caroline Wozniacki [10], (Russia) Anastasia Pavlyuchenkova [19], (Czech Republic) Klára Zakopalová [23], (Czech Republic) Lucie Šafářová [25]
  - Men's Doubles: (Mexico) Santiago González / (United States) Scott Lipsky [11], (Austria) Julian Knowle / (Slovakia) Filip Polášek [15]
  - Women's Doubles: (United States) Liezel Huber / (Spain) María José Martínez Sánchez [5], (Slovakia) Daniela Hantuchová / (Spain) Anabel Medina Garrigues [16]

Matches on main courts
Matches on Court Philippe Chatrier (Center Court)
| Event | Winner | Loser | Score |
|---|---|---|---|
| Women's Singles 1st Round | (Belarus) Victoria Azarenka [3] | (Russia) Elena Vesnina | 6–1, 6–4 |
| Men's Singles 2nd Round | (France) Jo-Wilfried Tsonga [6] | (Finland) Jarkko Nieminen | 7–6^{(8–6)}, 6–4, 6–3 |
| Men's Singles 2nd Round | (France) Gaël Monfils [WC] | (Latvia) Ernests Gulbis | 6–7^{(5–7)}, 6–4, 7–6^{(7–4)}, 6–2 |
| Women's Singles 2nd Round | (United States) Serena Williams [1] | (France) Caroline Garcia [WC] | 6–1, 6–2 |
Matches on Court Suzanne Lenglen (Grandstand)
| Event | Winner | Loser | Score |
| Women's Singles 1st Round | (Czech Republic) Petra Kvitová [7] | (France) Aravane Rezaï [WC] | 6–3, 4–6, 6–2 |
| Men's Singles 1st Round | (France) Benoît Paire [24] | (Cyprus) Marcos Baghdatis | 3–6, 7–6^{(7–1)}, 6–4, 6–4 |
| Men's Singles 2nd Round | (Canada) Milos Raonic [14] | (France) Michaël Llodra | 7–5, 3–6, 7–6^{(7–3)}, 6–2 |
| Men's Singles 2nd Round | (Switzerland) Roger Federer [2] | (India) Somdev Devvarman [Q] | 6–2, 6–1, 6–1 |
| Women's Singles 2nd Round | (Serbia) Ana Ivanovic [14] | (France) Mathilde Johansson | 6–2, 6–2 |

== Day 5 (30 May) ==
- Schedule of Play
- Seeds out:
  - Women's Singles: (China) Li Na [6], (Slovakia) Dominika Cibulková [16], (Kazakhstan) Yaroslava Shvedova [27]
  - Men's Doubles: (United Kingdom) Colin Fleming / (United Kingdom) Jonathan Marray [10]
  - Women's Doubles: (United States) Raquel Kops-Jones / (United States) Abigail Spears [6], (United States) Serena Williams / (United States) Venus Williams [12]

Matches on main courts
Matches on Court Philippe Chatrier (Center Court)
| Event | Winner | Loser | Score |
|---|---|---|---|
| Women's Singles 2nd Round | (Australia) Samantha Stosur [9] | (France) Kristina Mladenovic | 6–4, 6–3 |
| Men's Singles 2nd Round | (Serbia) Novak Djokovic [1] | (Argentina) Guido Pella | 6–2, 6–0, 6–2 |
| Women's Singles 2nd Round | (Canada) Eugenie Bouchard vs (Russia) Maria Sharapova [2] | | 2–6, 2–4, suspended |
| Men's Singles 2nd Round | (Poland) Michał Przysiężny [Q] vs (France) Richard Gasquet [7] | | Cancelled |
Matches on Court Suzanne Lenglen (Grandstand)
| Event | Winner | Loser | Score |
| Men's Singles 2nd Round | (Bulgaria) Grigor Dimitrov [26] | (France) Lucas Pouille [WC] | 6–1, 7–6^{(7–4)}, 6–1 |
| Women's Singles 2nd Round | (Belarus) Victoria Azarenka [3] | (Germany) Annika Beck | 6–4, 6–3 |
| Men's Singles 2nd Round | (Spain) Rafael Nadal [3] vs (Slovakia) Martin Kližan | | Cancelled |
| Women's Singles 2nd Round | (Italy) Francesca Schiavone vs (Belgium) Kirsten Flipkens [21] | | Cancelled |

== Day 6 (31 May) ==
- Schedule of Play
- Seeds out:
  - Men's Singles: (Croatia) Marin Čilić [10], (Canada) Milos Raonic [14], (United States) Sam Querrey [18], (Italy) Andreas Seppi [20], (France) Jérémy Chardy [25], (France) Julien Benneteau [30]
  - Women's Singles: (Belgium) Kirsten Flipkens [21], (Romania) Sorana Cîrstea [26], (United States) Varvara Lepchenko [29], (Germany) Sabine Lisicki [32]
  - Men's Doubles: (Sweden) Robert Lindstedt / (Canada) Daniel Nestor [3]
  - Women's Doubles: (Australia) Ashleigh Barty / (Australia) Casey Dellacqua [14]
  - Mixed's Doubles: (India) Sania Mirza / (Sweden) Robert Lindstedt [1], (Russia) Elena Vesnina / (Belarus) Max Mirnyi [2]

Matches on main courts
Matches on Court Philippe Chatrier (Center Court)
| Event | Winner | Loser | Score |
|---|---|---|---|
| Women's Singles 2nd Round | (France) Marion Bartoli [13] | (Colombia) Mariana Duque | 7–6^{(7–5)}, 7–5 |
| Women's Singles 2nd Round | (Russia) Maria Sharapova [2] | (Canada) Eugenie Bouchard | 6–2, 6–4 |
| Men's Singles 3rd Round | (Switzerland) Roger Federer [2] | (France) Julien Benneteau [30] | 6–3, 6–4, 7–5 |
| Men's Singles 3rd Round | (France) Jo-Wilfried Tsonga [6] | (France) Jérémy Chardy [25] | 6–1, 6–2, 7–5 |
| Women's Singles 3rd Round | (Serbia) Ana Ivanovic [14] | (France) Virginie Razzano [WC] | 6–3, 6–2 |
Matches on Court Suzanne Lenglen (Grandstand)
| Event | Winner | Loser | Score |
| Men's Singles 2nd Round | (Spain) Rafael Nadal [3] | (Slovakia) Martin Kližan | 4–6, 6–3, 6–3, 6–3 |
| Women's Singles 3rd Round | (United States) Serena Williams [1] | (Romania) Sorana Cîrstea [26] | 6–0, 6–2 |
| Men's Singles 3rd Round | (Spain) Tommy Robredo [32] | (France) Gaël Monfils [WC] | 2–6, 6–7^{(5–7)}, 6–2, 7–6^{(7–3)}, 6–2 |
| Women's Singles 3rd Round | (Poland) Agnieszka Radwańska [4] | (Germany) Dinah Pfizenmaier | 6–3, 6–4 |

== Day 7 (1 June) ==
- Schedule of Play
- Seeds out:
  - Men's Singles: (Serbia) Janko Tipsarević [8], (United States) John Isner [19], (Poland) Jerzy Janowicz [21], (France) Benoît Paire [24], (Bulgaria) Grigor Dimitrov [26], (Italy) Fabio Fognini [27]
  - Women's Singles: (Czech Republic) Petra Kvitová [7], (Australia) Samantha Stosur [9], (France) Marion Bartoli [13], (France) Alizé Cornet [31]
  - Men's Doubles: (Belarus) Max Mirnyi / (Romania) Horia Tecău [5], (Austria) Jürgen Melzer / (India) Leander Paes [9]
  - Women's Doubles: (Chinese Taipei) Hsieh Su-wei / (China) Peng Shuai [8]
  - Mixed's Doubles: (Australia) Casey Dellacqua / (India) Mahesh Bhupathi [7]

Matches on main courts
Matches on Court Philippe Chatrier (Center Court)
| Event | Winner | Loser | Score |
|---|---|---|---|
| Women's Singles 3rd Round | (Belarus) Victoria Azarenka [3] | (France) Alizé Cornet [31] | 4–6, 6–3, 6–1 |
| Women's Singles 3rd Round | (Russia) Maria Sharapova [2] | (China) Zheng Jie | 6–1, 7–5 |
| Men's Singles 3rd Round | (Spain) Rafael Nadal [3] | (Italy) Fabio Fognini [27] | 7–6^{(7–5)}, 6–4, 6–4 |
| Men's Singles 3rd Round | (Serbia) Novak Djokovic [1] | (Bulgaria) Grigor Dimitrov [26] | 6–2, 6–2, 6–3 |
Matches on Court Suzanne Lenglen (Grandstand)
| Event | Winner | Loser | Score |
| Men's Singles 3rd Round | (Japan) Kei Nishikori [13] | (France) Benoît Paire [24] | 6–3, 6–7^{(3–7)}, 6–4, 6–1 |
| Women's Singles 3rd Round | (Italy) Francesca Schiavone | (France) Marion Bartoli [13] | 6–2, 6–1 |
| Men's Singles 3rd Round | (France) Richard Gasquet [7] | (Russia) Nikolay Davydenko | 6–4, 6–4, 6–3 |
| Women's Singles 3rd Round | (Serbia) Jelena Janković [18] | (Australia) Samantha Stosur [9] | 3–6, 6–3, 6–4 |

== Day 8 (2 June) ==
- Schedule of Play
- Seeds out:
  - Men's Singles: (Spain) Nicolás Almagro [11], (France) Gilles Simon [15], (South Africa) Kevin Anderson [23]
  - Women's Singles: (Germany) Angelique Kerber [8], (Serbia) Ana Ivanovic [14], (Italy) Roberta Vinci [15], (Spain) Carla Suárez Navarro [20]
  - Men's Doubles: (France) Julien Benneteau / (Serbia) Nenad Zimonjić [13]
  - Women's Doubles: (Germany) Anna-Lena Grönefeld / (Czech Republic) Květa Peschke [9], (Chinese Taipei) Chan Hao-ching / (Croatia) Darija Jurak [15]
  - Mixed Doubles: (Germany) Anna-Lena Grönefeld / (Romania) Horia Tecău [6]

Matches on main courts
Matches on Court Philippe Chatrier (Center Court)
| Event | Winner | Loser | Score |
|---|---|---|---|
| Women's Singles 4th Round | (Russia) Svetlana Kuznetsova | (Germany) Angelique Kerber [8] | 6–4, 4–6, 6–4 |
| Women's Singles 4th Round | (United States) Serena Williams [1] | (Italy) Roberta Vinci [15] | 6–1, 6–3 |
| Men's Singles 4th Round | (France) Jo-Wilfried Tsonga [6] | (Serbia) Viktor Troicki | 6–3, 6–3, 6–3 |
| Men's Singles 4th Round | (Switzerland) Roger Federer [2] | (France) Gilles Simon [15] | 6–1, 4–6, 2–6, 6–2, 6–3 |
Matches on Court Suzanne Lenglen (Grandstand)
| Event | Winner | Loser | Score |
| Men's Singles 4th Round | (Spain) David Ferrer [4] | (South Africa) Kevin Anderson [23] | 6–3, 6–1, 6–1 |
| Men's Singles 4th Round | (Spain) Tommy Robredo [32] | (Spain) Nicolás Almagro [11] | 6–7^{(5–7)}, 3–6, 6–4, 6–4, 6–4 |
| Women's Singles 4th Round | (Italy) Sara Errani [5] | (Spain) Carla Suárez Navarro [20] | 5–7, 6–4, 6–3 |
| Women's Singles 4th Round | (Poland) Agnieszka Radwańska [4] | (Serbia) Ana Ivanovic [14] | 6–2, 6–4 |

== Day 9 (3 June) ==
- Schedule of Play
- Seeds out:
  - Men's Singles: (France) Richard Gasquet [7], (Japan) Kei Nishikori [13], (Germany) Philipp Kohlschreiber [16], (Russia) Mikhail Youzhny [29]
  - Women's Singles: (United States) Sloane Stephens [17]
  - Men's Doubles: (Pakistan) Aisam-ul-Haq Qureshi / (Netherlands) Jean-Julien Rojer [6]
  - Women's Doubles: (China) Shuai Zhang / (China) Zheng Jie [13]
  - Mixed Doubles: (Slovenia) Katarina Srebotnik / (Serbia) Nenad Zimonjić [3]

Matches on main courts
Matches on Court Philippe Chatrier (Center Court)
| Event | Winner | Loser | Score |
|---|---|---|---|
| Women's Singles 4th Round | (Belarus) Victoria Azarenka [3] | (Italy) Francesca Schiavone | 6–3, 6–0 |
| Men's Singles 4th Round | (Serbia) Novak Djokovic [1] | (Germany) Philipp Kohlschreiber [16] | 4–6, 6–3, 6–4, 6–4 |
| Men's Singles 4th Round | (Spain) Rafael Nadal [3] | (Japan) Kei Nishikori [13] | 6–4, 6–1, 6–3 |
| Women's Singles 4th Round | (Russia) Maria Sharapova [2] | (United States) Sloane Stephens [17] | 6–4, 6–3 |
Matches on Court Suzanne Lenglen (Grandstand)
| Event | Winner | Loser | Score |
| Men's Singles 4th Round | (Germany) Tommy Haas [12] | (Russia) Mikhail Youzhny [29] | 6–1, 6–1, 6–3 |
| Women's Singles 4th Round | (Russia) Maria Kirilenko [12] | (United States) Bethanie Mattek-Sands | 7–5, 6–4 |
| Men's Singles 4th Round | (Switzerland) Stanislas Wawrinka [9] | (France) Richard Gasquet [7] | 6–7^{(5–7)}, 4–6, 6–4, 7–5, 8–6 |
| Women's Singles 4th Round | (Serbia) Jelena Janković [18] | (United States) Jamie Hampton | 6–0, 6–2 |

== Day 10 (4 June) ==
- Schedule of Play
- Seeds out:
  - Men's Singles: (Switzerland) Roger Federer [2], (Spain) Tommy Robredo [32]
  - Women's Singles: (Poland) Agnieszka Radwańska [4]
  - Men's Doubles: (Spain) Marcel Granollers / (Spain) Marc López [2], (Croatia) Ivan Dodig / (Brazil) Marcelo Melo [12]
  - Women's Doubles: (United States) Bethanie Mattek-Sands / (India) Sania Mirza [7]

Matches on main courts
Matches on Court Philippe Chatrier (Center Court)
| Event | Winner | Loser | Score |
|---|---|---|---|
| Women's Singles Quarterfinals | (Italy) Sara Errani [5] | (Poland) Agnieszka Radwańska [4] | 6–4, 7–6^{(8–6)} |
| Men's Singles Quarterfinals | (France) Jo-Wilfried Tsonga [6] | (Switzerland) Roger Federer [2] | 7–5, 6–3, 6–3 |
Matches on Court Suzanne Lenglen (Grandstand)
| Event | Winner | Loser | Score |
| Women's Singles Quarterfinals | (United States) Serena Williams [1] | (Russia) Svetlana Kuznetsova | 6–1, 3–6, 6–3 |
| Men's Singles Quarterfinals | (Spain) David Ferrer [4] | (Spain) Tommy Robredo [32] | 6–2, 6–1, 6–1 |
| Women's Doubles 3rd Round | (France) Kristina Mladenovic [10] (Kazakhstan) Galina Voskoboeva [10] | (Georgia (country)) Oksana Kalashnikova (Poland) Alicja Rosolska | 6–1, 6–1 |

== Day 11 (5 June) ==
- Schedule of Play
- Seeds out:
  - Men's Singles: (Switzerland) Stanislas Wawrinka [9], (Germany) Tommy Haas [12]
  - Women's Singles: (Russia) Maria Kirilenko [12], (Serbia) Jelena Janković [18]
  - Men's Doubles: (Spain) David Marrero / (Spain) Fernando Verdasco [8], (Poland) Mariusz Fyrstenberg / (Poland) Marcin Matkowski [16]
  - Women's Doubles: (France) Kristina Mladenovic / (Kazakhstan) Galina Voskoboeva [10], (Russia) Anastasia Pavlyuchenkova / (Czech Republic) Lucie Šafářová [11]
  - Mixed Doubles: (United States) Lisa Raymond / (Brazil) Bruno Soares [4], (United States) Liezel Huber / (Brazil) Marcelo Melo [8]

Matches on main courts
Matches on Court Philippe Chatrier (Center Court)
| Event | Winner | Loser | Score |
|---|---|---|---|
| Women's Singles Quarterfinals | (Russia) Maria Sharapova [2] | (Serbia) Jelena Janković [18] | 0–6, 6–4, 6–3 |
| Men's Singles Quarterfinals | (Spain) Rafael Nadal [3] | (Switzerland) Stanislas Wawrinka [9] | 6–2, 6–3, 6–1 |
| Men's Doubles Quarterfinals | (United States) Bob Bryan [1] (United States) Mike Bryan [1] | (Spain) David Marrero [8] (Spain) Fernando Verdasco [8] | 6–3, 6–4 |
Matches on Court Suzanne Lenglen (Grandstand)
| Event | Winner | Loser | Score |
| Women's Singles Quarterfinals | (Belarus) Victoria Azarenka [3] | (Russia) Maria Kirilenko [12] | 7–6^{(7–3)}, 6–2 |
| Men's Singles Quarterfinals | (Serbia) Novak Djokovic [1] | (Germany) Tommy Haas [12] | 6–3, 7–6^{(7–5)}, 7–5 |

== Day 12 (6 June) ==
- Schedule of Play
- Seeds out:
  - Women's Singles: (Belarus) Victoria Azarenka [3], (Italy) Sara Errani [5]
  - Men's Doubles: (Austria) Alexander Peya / (Brazil) Bruno Soares [7]
  - Mixed Doubles: (France) Kristina Mladenovic / (Canada) Daniel Nestor [5]

Matches on main courts
Matches on Court Philippe Chatrier (Center Court)
| Event | Winner | Loser | Score |
|---|---|---|---|
| Mixed Doubles Final | (Czech Republic) Lucie Hradecká (Czech Republic) František Čermák | (France) Kristina Mladenovic [5] (Canada) Daniel Nestor [5] | 1–6, 6–4, [10–6] |
| Women's Singles Semifinals | (Russia) Maria Sharapova [2] | (Belarus) Victoria Azarenka [3] | 6–1, 2–6, 6–4 |
| Women's Singles Semifinals | (United States) Serena Williams [1] | (Italy) Sara Errani [5] | 6–0, 6–1 |
Matches on Court Suzanne Lenglen (Grandstand)
| Event | Winner | Loser | Score |
| Men's Legends Over 45 | (France) Guy Forget (France) Henri Leconte | (Sweden) Mikael Pernfors (Sweden) Mats Wilander | 1–6, 6–4, [10–7] |
| Men's Legends Over 45 | (United States) John McEnroe (Italy) Adriano Panatta | (Australia) Peter McNamara (Germany) Michael Stich | 6–3, 3–6, [10–2] |
| Men's Doubles Semifinals | (France) Michaël Llodra (France) Nicolas Mahut | (Uruguay) Pablo Cuevas (Argentina) Horacio Zeballos | 7–6^{(7–4)}, 6–2 |
| Men's Doubles Semifinals | (United States) Bob Bryan [1] (United States) Mike Bryan [1] | (Austria) Alexander Peya [7] (Brazil) Bruno Soares [7] | 6–1, 6–4 |

== Day 13 (7 June) ==
- Schedule of Play
- Seeds out:
  - Men's Singles: (Serbia) Novak Djokovic [1], (France) Jo-Wilfried Tsonga [6]
  - Women's Doubles: (Czech Republic) Andrea Hlaváčková / (Czech Republic) Lucie Hradecká [2], (Russia) Nadia Petrova / (Slovenia) Katarina Srebotnik [3]

Matches on main courts
Matches on Court Philippe Chatrier (Center Court)
| Event | Winner | Loser | Score |
|---|---|---|---|
| Men's Singles Semifinals | (Spain) Rafael Nadal [3] | (Serbia) Novak Djokovic [1] | 6–4, 3–6, 6–1, 6–7^{(3–7)}, 9–7 |
| Men's Singles Semifinals | (Spain) David Ferrer [4] | (France) Jo-Wilfried Tsonga [6] | 6–1, 7–6^{(7–3)}, 6–2 |
Matches on Court Suzanne Lenglen (Grandstand)
| Event | Winner | Loser | Score |
| Men's Legends Over 45 | (Iran) Mansour Bahrami (Australia) Pat Cash | (Sweden) Mikael Pernfors (Sweden) Mats Wilander | 4–6, 6–4, [10–7] |
| Women's Legends Doubles | (United States) Lindsay Davenport (Switzerland) Martina Hingis | (France) Nathalie Tauziat (France) Sandrine Testud | 6–2, 6–2 |
| Women's Doubles Semifinals | (Russia) Ekaterina Makarova [4] (Russia) Elena Vesnina [4] | (Czech Republic) Andrea Hlaváčková [2] (Czech Republic) Lucie Hradecká [2] | 6–4, 7–5 |
| Women's Doubles Semifinals | (Italy) Sara Errani [1] (Italy) Roberta Vinci [1] | (Russia) Nadia Petrova [3] (Slovenia) Katarina Srebotnik [3] | 6–3, 5–7, 6–3 |

== Day 14 (8 June) ==
- Schedule of Play
- Seeds out:
  - Women's Singles: (Russia) Maria Sharapova [2]

Matches on main courts
Matches on Court Philippe Chatrier (Center Court)
| Event | Winner | Loser | Score |
|---|---|---|---|
| Women's Singles Final | (United States) Serena Williams [1] | (Russia) Maria Sharapova [2] | 6–4, 6–4 |
| Men's Doubles Final | (United States) Bob Bryan (United States) Mike Bryan [1] | (France) Michaël Llodra (France) Nicolas Mahut | 6–4, 4–6, 7–6^{(7–4)} |
Matches on Court Suzanne Lenglen (Grandstand)
| Event | Winner | Loser | Score |
| Men's Legends Over 45 | (Ecuador) Andrés Gómez (Australia) Mark Woodforde | (United States) John McEnroe (Italy) Adriano Panatta | 6–4, 6–3 |
| Women's Legends Doubles | (United States) Lindsay Davenport (Switzerland) Martina Hingis | (Russia) Elena Dementieva (United States) Martina Navratilova | 6–4, 6–2 |

== Day 15 (9 June) ==
- Schedule of Play
- Seeds out:
  - Men's Singles: (Spain) David Ferrer [4]
  - Women's Doubles: (Italy) Sara Errani / (Italy) Roberta Vinci [1]

Matches on main courts
Matches on Court Philippe Chatrier (Center Court)
| Event | Winner | Loser | Score |
|---|---|---|---|
| Women's Doubles Final | (Russia) Ekaterina Makarova (Russia) Elena Vesnina | (Italy) Sara Errani (Italy) Roberta Vinci [1] | 7–5, 6–2 |
| Men's Singles Final | (Spain) Rafael Nadal [3] | (Spain) David Ferrer [4] | 6–3, 6–2, 6–3 |
Matches on Court Suzanne Lenglen (Grandstand)
| Event | Winner | Loser | Score |
| Men's Legends Under 45 Final | (France) Cédric Pioline (France) Fabrice Santoro | (Spain) Albert Costa (Spain) Carlos Moyá | 4–6, 6–4, [4–1] |
| Men's Legends Over 45 Final | (Ecuador) Andrés Gómez (Australia) Mark Woodforde | (Iran) Mansour Bahrami (Australia) Pat Cash | 6–1, 7–6^{(7–2)} |
