= Sabine Ellerbrock =

German wheelchair tennis player

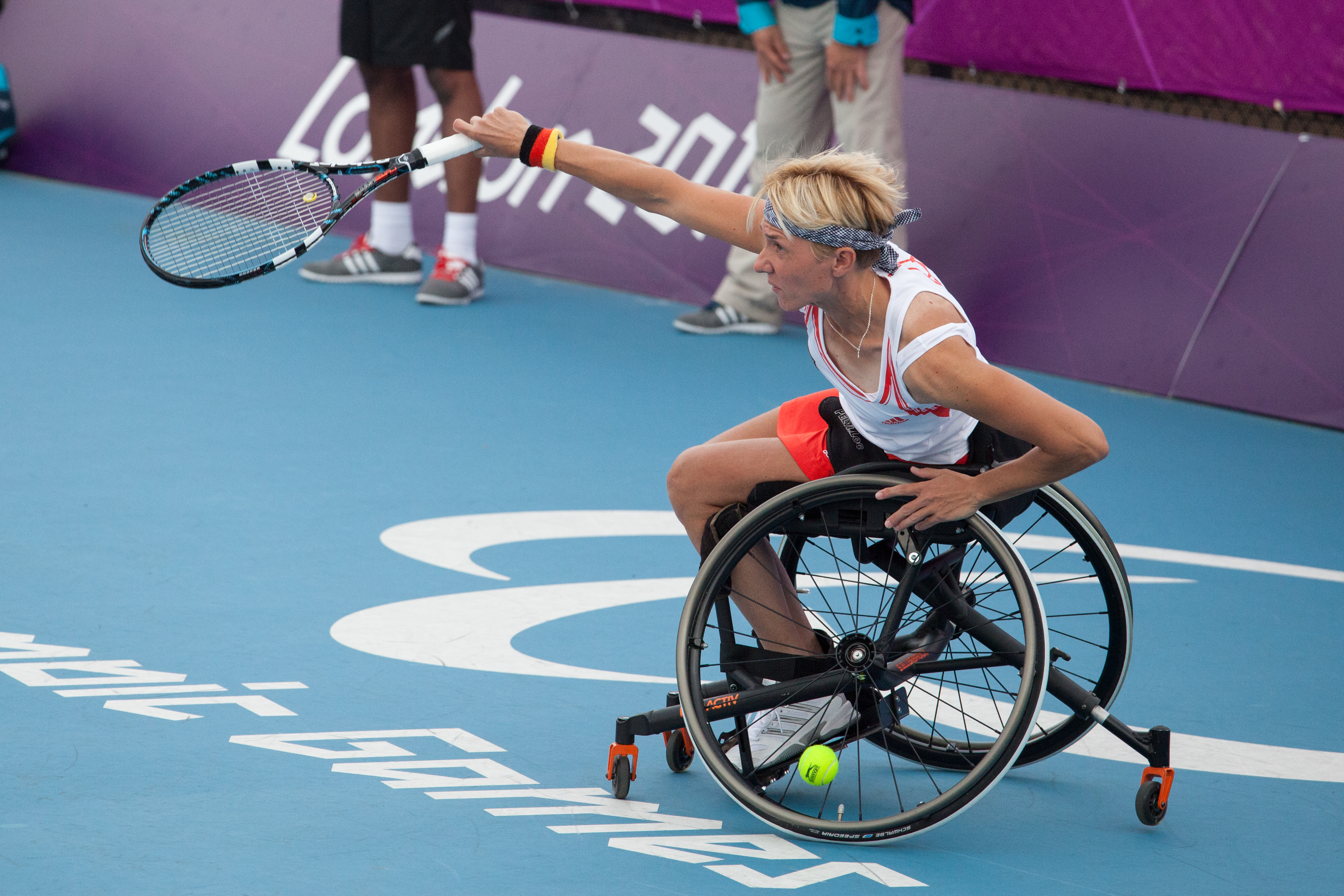
- Ellerbrock playing during the 2012 Paralympic Games.
- Country (sports): Germany
- Residence: Bielefeld, Germany
- Born: 1 November 1975 (age 49) Bielefeld, Germany
- Turned pro: 2009
- Retired: 2020
- Plays: Right handed
- Official website: Sabine Ellerbrock

Singles
- Career record: 198 - 56
- Highest ranking: No. 1 (1 July 2013)

Grand Slam singles results
- Australian Open: W (2014)
- French Open: W (2013)
- Wimbledon: F (2017)
- US Open: F (2013)

Other tournaments
- Paralympic Games: Fourth (2012)

Doubles
- Career record: 117 - 52
- Highest ranking: No. 4 (10 June 2013)

Grand Slam doubles results
- Australian Open: F (2019)
- French Open: F (2012, 2013)
- Wimbledon: F (2018)
- US Open: F (2013, 2015, 2019)

Other doubles tournaments
- Masters Doubles: F (2013)
- Last updated on: 1 July 2013.

Sabine Ellerbrock (born 1 November 1975 in Bielefeld) is a former German wheelchair tennis player. Ellerbrock is the 2013 French Grand Slam champion in Wheelchair Women's Singles.

== Tennis career ==
Ellerbrock played tennis for 25 years as a non-disabled tennis player. She had a foot infection in 2007 after an operation. She started playing wheel chair tennis in 2009.

=== 2013–present ===
During the course of the 2013 season Ellerbrock won titles in Queensland, Adelaide, Nottingham, Salzburg, Gross-Sieghartz, Turin and Sardinia. Ellerbrock was a losing finalist in Paris and Jambes. Ellerbrock reached her first Grand Slam final in Melbourne and despite saving seven match points and coming back from 2–5 in the final set it was all in vain as she lost 5–7 in the third set. However Ellerbrock won her first Grand Slam title at Roland Garros. Ellerbrock was also the runner up in New York. During the season Ellerbrock ascended to world number one after the French Open where she lost in the final but with Aniek van Koot losing in the semi-finals this allowed Sabine to take the top spot on 1 July. She relinquished the position to van Koot after losing to the Dutch player in the US Open final in New York.

In doubles competition Ellerbrock was the runner up in Jambes with Montjane. Ellerbrock was victorious in Salzburg and Sardinia with Marianna Lauro. Runner up in Roland Garros with Sharon Walraven and New York with Yui Kamiji.

Ellerbrock began the 2014 season by winning the Australian Open and as a result of van Koot being injured she returned to the world number one position.

Ellerbrock announced her retirement in May 2020.

== Wheelchair Grand Slam finals ==
=== Singles: 7 (2 titles, 5 runners-up) ===
| Result | Year | Championship | Surface | Opponent | Score |
|---|---|---|---|---|---|
| Loss | 2013 | Australian Open | Hard | (Netherlands) Aniek van Koot | 1–6, 6–1, 5–7 |
| Win | 2013 | French Open | Clay | (Netherlands) Jiske Griffioen | 6–3, 3–6, 6–1 |
| Loss | 2013 | US Open | Hard | (Netherlands) Aniek van Koot | 6–3, 2–6, 6–7^{(3–7)} |
| Win | 2014 | Australian Open | Hard | (Japan) Yui Kamiji | 3–6, 6–4, 6–2 |
| Loss | 2016 | French Open | Clay | (Netherlands) Marjolein Buis | 3–6, 4–6 |
| Loss | 2017 | French Open | Clay | (Japan) Yui Kamiji | 5–7, 4–6 |
| Loss | 2017 | Wimbledon | Grass | (Netherlands) Diede de Groot | 0–6, 4–6 |

=== Doubles: 7 (7 runner-ups) ===
| Result | Year | Championship | Surface | Partner | Opponents | Score |
|---|---|---|---|---|---|---|
| Loss | 2012 | French Open | Clay | (Japan) Yui Kamiji | (Netherlands) Marjolein Buis (Netherlands) Esther Vergeer | 0–6, 1–6 |
| Loss | 2013 | French Open | Clay | (Netherlands) Sharon Walraven | (Netherlands) Jiske Griffioen (Netherlands) Aniek van Koot | 2–6, 3–6 |
| Loss | 2013 | US Open | Hard | (Japan) Yui Kamiji | (Netherlands) Jiske Griffioen (Netherlands) Aniek van Koot | 3–6, 4–6 |
| Loss | 2015 | US Open | Hard | (Netherlands) Marjolein Buis | (Netherlands) Jiske Griffioen (Netherlands) Aniek van Koot | 6–7^{(3–7)}, 1–6 |
| Loss | 2018 | Wimbledon | Grass | (United Kingdom) Lucy Shuker | (Netherlands) Diede de Groot (Japan) Yui Kamiji | 1–6, 1–6 |
| Loss | 2019 | Australian Open | Hard | (Netherlands) Marjolein Buis | (Netherlands) Diede de Groot (Netherlands) Aniek van Koot | 7–5, 6–7^{(4–7)}, [8–10] |
| Loss | 2019 | US Open | Hard | (South Africa) Kgothatso Montjane | (Netherlands) Diede de Groot (Netherlands) Aniek van Koot | 2–6, 0–6 |
