= Doménica González =

Ecuadorian tennis player

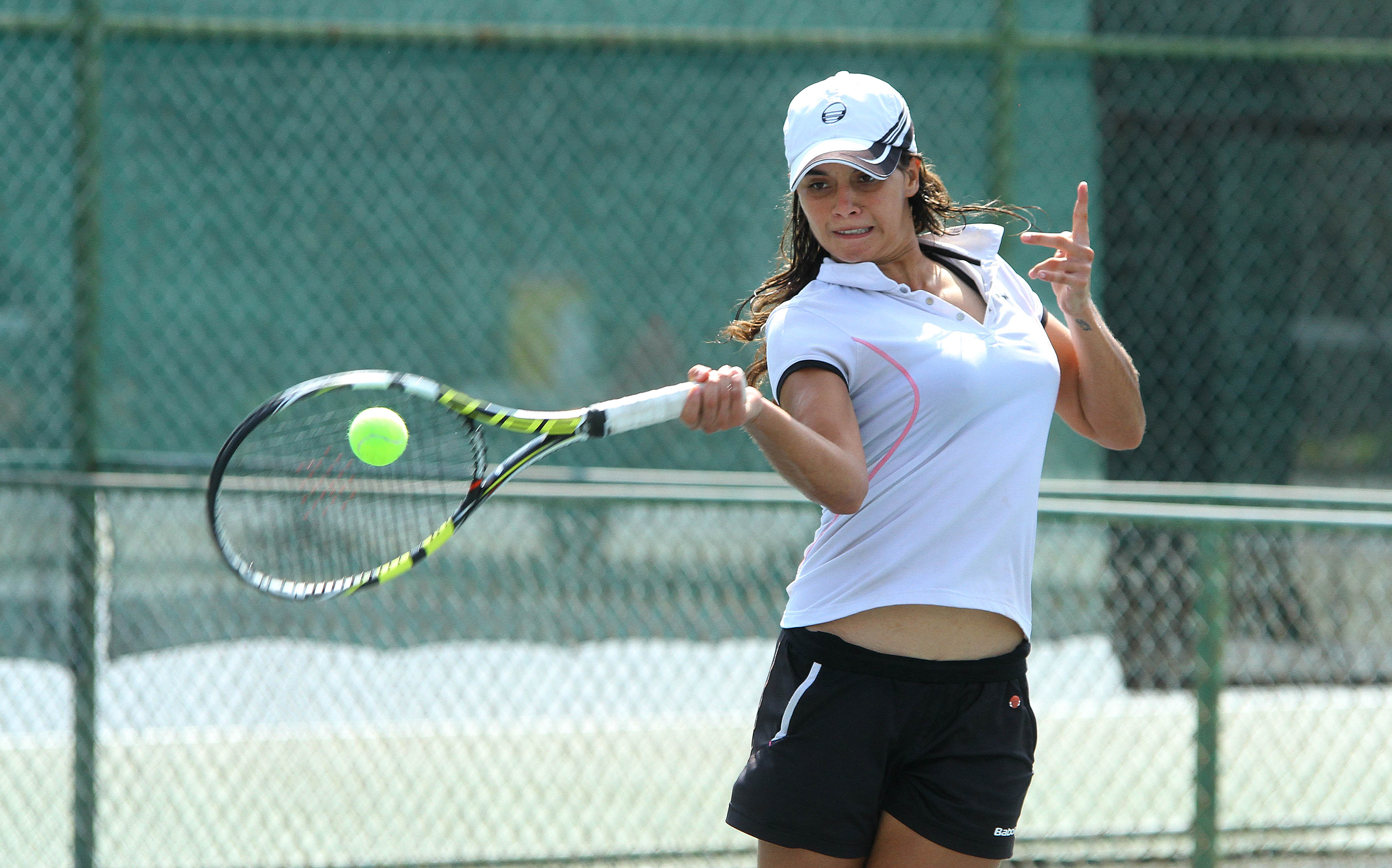
- González at the 2015 Fed Cup
- Full name: Doménica Alejandra González Palau
- Country (sports): Ecuador
- Born: 12 February 1996 (age 29); Guayaquil, Ecuador
- Height: 1.66 m (5 ft 5 in)
- Prize money: US$6,995

Singles
- Career record: 23–16
- Career titles: 1 ITF
- Highest ranking: No. 669 (5 November 2012)

Grand Slam singles results
- French Open Junior: 2R (2013)
- Wimbledon Junior: 1R (2013)
- US Open Junior: 1R (2011, 2012)

Doubles
- Career record: 19–13
- Career titles: 2 ITF
- Highest ranking: No. 697 (29 October 2012)

Grand Slam doubles results
- French Open Junior: F (2013)
- Wimbledon Junior: QF (2013)
- US Open Junior: 2R (2011)

Team competitions
- Fed Cup: 17–6

Doménica Alejandra González Palau (born 12 February 1996) is an Ecuadorian former tennis player.

González has won one singles and two doubles titles on the ITF Circuit in her career. On 5 November 2012, she reached her best singles ranking of world No. 669. On 29 October 2012, she peaked at No. 697 in the doubles rankings.

Playing for Ecuador Fed Cup team, Guayaquil-born González has a win–loss record of 17–6.

== ITF finals ==
=== Singles: 2 (1–1) ===
Legend $100,000 tournaments $75,000 tournaments $50,000 tournaments $25,000 tournaments $10,000 tournaments	Finals by surface Hard (1–0) Clay (0–1) Grass (0–0) Carpet (0–0)

Result	W–L	Date	Tournament	Surface	Opponent	Score
Loss	1.	Nov 2010	ITF Quito, Ecuador	Clay	(Ecuador) Marie Elise Casares	2–6, 5–7
Win	1.	Nov 2011	ITF Salvador, Brazil	Hard	(Brazil) Gabriela Cé	3–6, 6–3, 6–2

=== Doubles: 2 (2–0) ===
Legend $100,000 tournaments $75,000 tournaments $50,000 tournaments $25,000 tournaments $10,000 tournaments	Finals by surface Hard (1–0) Clay (1–0) Grass (0–0) Carpet (0–0)

Result	W–L	Date	Tournament	Surface	Partner	Opponents	Score
Win	1.	Oct 2013	ITF Pereira, Colombia	Clay	(Chile) Camila Silva	(Colombia) Sofía Múnera Sánchez (Hungary) Szabina Szlavikovics	6–4, 6–2
Win	2.	Oct 2013	ITF Bogotá, Colombia	Hard	(Chile) Camila Silva	(Netherlands) Anna Katalina Alzate Esmurazaeva (Netherlands) Jade Schoelink	6–2, 6–4

== Junior Grand Slam finals ==
=== Girls' doubles ===
Result	Year	Tournament	Surface	Partner	Opponents	Score
Loss	2013	French Open	Clay	(Brazil) Beatriz Haddad Maia	(Czech Republic) Barbora Krejčíková (Czech Republic) Kateřina Siniaková	5–7, 2–6
