= 2013 French Open – Girls' doubles =

Girls' doubles
- 2013 French Open

Final
- Champions: (Czech Republic) Barbora Krejčíková (Czech Republic) Kateřina Siniaková
- Runners-up: (Ecuador) Doménica González (Brazil) Beatriz Haddad Maia
- Score: 7–5, 6–2

Events
Singles	men	women		boys	girls
Doubles	men	women	mixed	boys	girls
WC Singles	men	women	quad
WC Doubles	men	women	quad
Legends	−45	45+	women
← 2012 ·	French Open	· 2014 →

Daria Gavrilova and Irina Khromacheva were the 2012 champions, but Gavrilova was no longer eligible to compete in junior tennis, so was unable to defend her title. Khromacheva entered qualifying for the women's draw, but lost in the second qualifying round.

Czech pair Barbora Krejčíková and Kateřina Siniaková won their first junior grand slam, defeating the South American duo of Doménica González and Beatriz Haddad Maia in the final, 7–5, 6–2.

== Seeds ==
1. (Switzerland) Belinda Bencic / (Germany) Antonia Lottner (quarterfinals)
2. (Czech Republic) Barbora Krejčíková / (Czech Republic) Kateřina Siniaková (champions)
3. (Croatia) Ana Konjuh / (Canada) Carol Zhao (semifinals)
4. (Russia) Darya Kasatkina / (Russia) Veronika Kudermetova (first round)
5. (United Kingdom) Katie Boulter / (United Kingdom) Katy Dunne (first round)
6. (Estonia) Anett Kontaveit / (Slovakia) Petra Uberalová (first round)
7. (Mexico) Alejandra Cisneros / (Mexico) Victoria Rodríguez (first round)
8. (Italy) Alice Matteucci / (Serbia) Nina Stojanović (semifinals)

== Draw ==
=== Key ===
- Q = Qualifier
- WC = Wild card
- LL = Lucky loser
- Alt = Alternate
- SE = Special exempt
- PR = Protected ranking
- ITF = ITF entry
- JE = Junior exempt
- w/o = Walkover
- r = Retired
- d = Defaulted
- SR = Special ranking

=== Finals ===
Semifinals
(Ecuador) Doménica González (Brazil) Beatriz Haddad Maia	7	6^{6}	[10]
8	(Italy) Alice Matteucci (Serbia) Nina Stojanović	5	7^{8}	[7]
3	(Croatia) Ana Konjuh (Canada) Carol Zhao	2	4
2	(Czech Republic) Barbora Krejčíková (Czech Republic) Kateřina Siniaková	6	6

Final
(Ecuador) Doménica González (Brazil) Beatriz Haddad Maia	5	2
2	(Czech Republic) Barbora Krejčíková (Czech Republic) Kateřina Siniaková	7	6

=== Top half ===
First round
1	(Switzerland) Belinda Bencic (Germany) Antonia Lottner	7	6
(United States) Jamie Loeb (Japan) Ayaka Okuno	5	4
(Russia) Maria Marfutina (Australia) Sara Tomic	2	6	[6]
(Kazakhstan) Anna Danilina (Russia) Elizaveta Kulichkova	6	2	[10]
WC	(France) Solène Guyomard (France) Carla Touly	3	4
(Romania) Ilka Csöregi (Czech Republic) Gabriela Pantůčková	6	6
(Ecuador) Doménica González (Brazil) Beatriz Haddad Maia	3	6	[10]
6	(Estonia) Anett Kontaveit (Slovakia) Petra Uberalová	6	3	[7]
4	(Russia) Darya Kasatkina (Russia) Veronika Kudermetova	6	5	[3]
(United States) Christina Makarova (Egypt) Sandra Samir	4	7	[10]
(Croatia) Adrijana Lekaj (Ukraine) Viktoriya Lushkova	6	6
WC	(France) Océane Dodin (France) Théo Gravouil	2	2
(France) Fiona Ferro (France) Margot Yerolymos	6	7^{7}
(Ukraine) Anhelina Kalinina (Ukraine) Helen Ploskina	2	6^{3}
(Romania) Ioana Ducu (Austria) Barbara Haas	4	6	[6]
8	(Italy) Alice Matteucci (Serbia) Nina Stojanović	6	4	[10]

Second round
1	(Switzerland) B Bencic (Germany) A Lottner	6	6
(Kazakhstan) A Danilina (Russia) E Kulichkova	1	4
(Romania) I Csöregi (Czech Republic) G Pantůčková	7	2	[6]
(Ecuador) D González (Brazil) B Haddad Maia	5	6	[10]
(United States) C Makarova (Egypt) S Samir	3	4
(Croatia) A Lekaj (Ukraine) V Lushkova	6	6
(France) F Ferro (France) M Yerolymos	6^{3}	6	[2]
8	(Italy) A Matteucci (Serbia) N Stojanović	7^{7}	4	[10]

Quarterfinals
1	(Switzerland) B Bencic (Germany) A Lottner	2	5
(Ecuador) D González (Brazil) B Haddad Maia	6	7
(Croatia) A Lekaj (Ukraine) V Lushkova	2	6^{6}
8	(Italy) A Matteucci (Serbia) N Stojanović	6	7^{8}

Semifinals
(Ecuador) D González (Brazil) B Haddad Maia	7	6^{6}	[10]
8	(Italy) A Matteucci (Serbia) N Stojanović	5	7^{8}	[7]

=== Bottom half ===
First round
5	(United Kingdom) Katie Boulter (United Kingdom) Katy Dunne	2	6	[6]
(Belarus) Iryna Shymanovich (Russia) Alina Silich	6	2	[10]
(Hong Kong) Katherine Ip (Japan) Hikari Yamamoto	1	6	[8]
(Brazil) Carolina Alves (Paraguay) Camila Giangreco Campiz	6	2	[10]
WC	(France) Apolline Rassat (France) Harmony Tan	1	3
Alt	(Italy) Deborah Chiesa (Spain) Sara Sorribes Tormo	6	6
(Switzerland) Chiara Grimm (Mexico) Renata Zarazúa	6^{4}	3
3	(Croatia) Ana Konjuh (Canada) Carol Zhao	7^{7}	6
7	(Mexico) Alejandra Cisneros (Mexico) Victoria Rodríguez	4	4
(Chinese Taipei) Hsu Ching-wen (Canada) Erin Routliffe	6	6
(Croatia) Jana Fett (Turkey) İpek Soylu	w/o
(Italy) Beatrice Lombardo (Italy) Giulia Pairone
WC	(France) Alice Bacquié (France) Jade Suvrijn	6	3	[7]
(Colombia) Laura Ucrós (Argentina) Constanza Vega	3	6	[10
(United States) Louisa Chirico (Russia) Varvara Flink	2	2
2	(Czech Republic) Barbora Krejčíková (Czech Republic) Kateřina Siniaková	6	6

Second round
(Belarus) I Shymanovich (Russia) A Silich	2	6	[10]
(Brazil) C Alves (Paraguay) C Giangreco Campiz	6	3	[7]
Alt	(Italy) D Chiesa (Spain) S Sorribes Tormo	3	6	[2]
3	(Croatia) A Konjuh (Canada) C Zhao	6	4	[10]
(Chinese Taipei) C-w Hsu (Canada) E Routliffe	1	2
(Croatia) J Fett (Turkey) İ Soylu	6	6
(Colombia) L Ucrós (Argentina) C Vega	2	0
2	(Czech Republic) B Krejčíková (Czech Republic) K Siniaková	6	6

Quarterfinals
(Belarus) I Shymanovich (Russia) A Silich	2	6	[3]
3	(Croatia) A Konjuh (Canada) C Zhao	6	4	[10]
(Croatia) J Fett (Turkey) İ Soylu	4	4
2	(Czech Republic) B Krejčíková (Czech Republic) K Siniaková	6	6

Semifinals
3	(Croatia) A Konjuh (Canada) C Zhao	2	4
2	(Czech Republic) B Krejčíková (Czech Republic) K Siniaková	6	6
