= 2013 French Open – Boys' singles =

Boys' singles
- 2013 French Open

Final
- Champion: (Chile) Cristian Garín
- Runner-up: (Germany) Alexander Zverev
- Score: 6–4, 6–1

Events
Singles	men	women		boys	girls
Doubles	men	women	mixed	boys	girls
WC Singles	men	women	quad
WC Doubles	men	women	quad
Legends	−45	45+	women
← 2012 ·	French Open	· 2014 →

Kimmer Coppejans was the 2012 champion, but was no longer eligible to compete in junior tennis, and thus could not defend his title.
Cristian Garín defeated Alexander Zverev, 6–4, 6–1 in the final to win the title.

== Seeds ==
1. (Australia) Nick Kyrgios (second round)
2. (Serbia) Nikola Milojević (semifinals)
3. (Serbia) Laslo Đere (third round)
4. (Germany) Alexander Zverev (final)
5. (United Kingdom) Kyle Edmund (quarterfinals)
6. (Italy) Gianluigi Quinzi (quarterfinals)
7. (Italy) Filippo Baldi (second round)
8. (Croatia) Borna Ćorić (semifinals)
9. (France) Maxime Hamou (first round)
10. (Belgium) Clément Geens (first round)
11. (France) Johan-Sébastien Tatlot (third round)
12. (South Africa) Wayne Montgomery (first round)
13. (Chile) Guillermo Núñez (quarterfinals)
14. (Portugal) Frederico Ferreira Silva (second round)
15. (United Kingdom) Cameron Norrie (first round)
16. (Chile) Nicolás Jarry (first round)

== Qualifiers ==
1. (Italy) Stefano Napolitano (second round)
2. (Japan) Takashi Saito (first round)
3. (Spain) Albert Alcaraz Ivorra (third round)
4. (Australia) Jay Andrijic (first round)
5. (Brazil) Rafael Matos (first round)
6. (Italy) Matteo Donati (second round)
7. (Romania) Luca George Tatomir (second round)
8. (Denmark) Simon Friis Søndergaard (first round)

== Main draw ==
=== Key ===
- Q = Qualifier
- WC = Wild card
- LL = Lucky loser
- Alt = Alternate
- SE = Special exempt
- PR = Protected ranking
- ITF = ITF entry
- JE = Junior exempt
- w/o = Walkover
- r = Retired
- d = Defaulted
- SR = Special ranking

=== Finals ===
Quarterfinals
13	(Chile) Guillermo Núñez	2	3
8	(Croatia) Borna Ćorić	6	6
(Chile) Cristian Garín	6	6
WC	(France) Calvin Hemery	3	0
5	(United Kingdom) Kyle Edmund	2	7	0
4	(Germany) Alexander Zverev	6	5	6
6	(Italy) Gianluigi Quinzi	6^{2}	2
2	(Serbia) Nikola Milojević	7^{7}	6

Semifinals
8	(Croatia) Borna Ćorić	5	2
(Chile) Cristian Garín	7	6
4	(Germany) Alexander Zverev	7	6
2	(Serbia) Nikola Milojević	5	1

Final
(Chile) Cristian Garín	6	6
4	(Germany) Alexander Zverev	4	1

=== Top half ===
==== Section 1 ====
First round
1	(Australia) Nick Kyrgios	6	6
WC	(France) Maxime Janvier	4	4
(Russia) Karen Khachanov	6	6
Q	(Brazil) Rafael Matos	2	0
WC	(France) Alexandre Müller	3	5
SE	(Japan) Ken Onishi	6	7
(United States) Luca Corinteli	0	5
13	(Chile) Guillermo Núñez	6	7
11	(France) Johan-Sébastien Tatlot	6	6
(Canada) Hugo Di Feo	2	2
Q	(Italy) Matteo Donati	6	6
(South Korea) Hong Seong-chan	0	0
(Germany) Maximilian Marterer	6	2	6
Q	(Denmark) Simon Friis Søndergaard	3	6	2
(Egypt) Mazen Osama	4	0
8	(Croatia) Borna Ćorić	6	6

Second round
1	(Australia) N Kyrgios	2	7^{8}	3
(Russia) K Khachanov	6	6^{6}	6
SE	(Japan) K Onishi	3	4
13	(Chile) G Núñez	6	6
11	(France) J-S Tatlot	6	6
Q	(Italy) M Donati	4	4
(Germany) M Marterer	3	3
8	(Croatia) B Ćorić	6	6

Third round
(Russia) K Khachanov	5	6	4
13	(Chile) G Núñez	7	4	6
11	(France) J-S Tatlot	7	0	6
8	(Croatia) B Ćorić	5	6	8

Quarterfinals
13	(Chile) G Núñez	2	3
8	(Croatia) B Ćorić	6	6

==== Section 2 ====
First round
3	(Serbia) Laslo Đere	6	6
(Argentina) Pedro Cachin	4	4
(Peru) Jorge Brian Panta	6	3	6
(Australia) Harry Bourchier	1	6	2
(France) Quentin Halys	6	3	6
(United States) Spencer Papa	3	6	4
(Chile) Cristian Garín	7	6
15	(United Kingdom) Cameron Norrie	5	2
12	(South Africa) Wayne Montgomery	3	2
(Poland) Kamil Majchrzak	6	6
(Austria) Lucas Miedler	3	6	6
WC	(France) Enzo Couacaud	6	0	8
Q	(Japan) Takashi Saito	3	2
WC	(France) Calvin Hemery	6	6
(South Korea) Lee Duck-hee	6^{3}	3
7	(Italy) Filippo Baldi	7^{7}	6

Second round
3	(Serbia) L Đere	6^{6}	6	7
(Peru) JB Panta	7^{8}	2	5
(France) Q Halys	5	0
(Chile) C Garín	7	6
(Poland) K Majchrzak	5	4
WC	(France) E Couacaud	7	6
WC	(France) C Hemery	6	4	6
7	(Italy) F Baldi	1	6	3

Third round
3	(Serbia) L Đere	6	3	2
(Chile) C Garín	3	6	6
WC	(France) E Couacaud	0	4
WC	(France) C Hemery	6	6

Quarterfinals
(Chile) C Garín	6	6
WC	(France) C Hemery	3	0

=== Bottom half ===
==== Section 3 ====
First round
5	(United Kingdom) Kyle Edmund	6	6^{5}	7
(Sweden) Elias Ymer	2	7^{7}	5
(Australia) Bradley Mousley	6	4	6
(Brazil) Marcelo Zormann da Silva	1	6	4
(France) Benjamin Bonzi	6	4	4
(United States) Noah Rubin	4	6	6
(Japan) Yoshihito Nishioka	6	6
10	(Belgium) Clément Geens	2	1
14	(Portugal) Frederico Ferreira Silva	7	3	7
WC	(France) Paul Cayré	5	6	5
(China) Zheng Weiqiang	3	3
(South Korea) Kim Young-seok	6	6
WC	(France) Enzo Py	6^{4}	5
Q	(Italy) Stefano Napolitano	7^{7}	7
(Russia) Roman Safiullin	1	0
4	(Germany) Alexander Zverev	6	6

Second round
5	(United Kingdom) K Edmund	6	5	6
(Australia) B Mousley	1	7	3
(United States) N Rubin	6	6
(Japan) Y Nishioka	1	4
14	(Portugal) FF Silva	5	3
(South Korea) Y-s Kim	7	6
Q	(Italy) S Napolitano	6	3	11
4	(Germany) A Zverev	2	6	13

Third round
5	(United Kingdom) K Edmund	7	5	6
(United States) N Rubin	5	7	3
(South Korea) Y-s Kim	2	4
4	(Germany) A Zverev	6	6

Quarterfinals
5	(United Kingdom) K Edmund	2	7	0
4	(Germany) A Zverev	6	5	6

==== Section 4 ====
First round
6	(Italy) Gianluigi Quinzi	1	6	6
WC	(France) Alexandre Favrot	6	1	4
(Slovakia) Matej Maruščák	5	3
(United States) Stefan Kozlov	7	6
Q	(Australia) Jay Andrijic	3	1
(South Korea) Chung Hyeon	6	6
Q	(Spain) Albert Alcaraz Ivorra	6	6^{5}	6
9	(France) Maxime Hamou	2	7^{7}	2
16	(Chile) Nicolás Jarry	4	4
Q	(Romania) Luca George Tatomir	6	6
(Mexico) Lucas Gómez	6	1	6
WC	(France) Théo Fournerie	3	6	1
(Japan) Naoki Nakagawa	6	4	6
(United Kingdom) Luke Bambridge	3	6	4
(Australia) Omar Jasika	1	1
2	(Serbia) Nikola Milojević	6	6

Second round
6	(Italy) G Quinzi	3	6	6
(United States) S Kozlov	6	1	4
(South Korea) H Chung	1	6	1
Q	(Spain) A Alcaraz Ivorra	6	2	6
Q	(Romania) LG Tatomir	7^{7}	4	3
(Mexico) L Gómez	6^{4}	6	6
(Japan) N Nakagawa	4	4
2	(Serbia) N Milojević	6	6

Third round
6	(Italy) G Quinzi	6	3	6
Q	(Spain) A Alcaraz Ivorra	2	6	2
(Mexico) L Gómez	1	0
2	(Serbia) N Milojević	6	6

Quarterfinals
6	(Italy) G Quinzi	6^{2}	2
2	(Serbia) N Milojević	7^{7}	6
