= 2013 French Open – Wheelchair men's singles =

Wheelchair men's singles
- 2013 French Open

Final
- Champion: (France) Stéphane Houdet
- Runner-up: (Japan) Shingo Kunieda
- Score: 7–5, 5–7, 7–6^{(7–5)}

Events
Singles	men	women		boys	girls
Doubles	men	women	mixed	boys	girls
WC Singles	men	women	quad
WC Doubles	men	women	quad
Legends	−45	45+	women
- French Open

Defending champion Stéphane Houdet defeated Shingo Kunieda in the final, 7–5, 5–7, 7–6^{(7–5)} to win the men's singles wheelchair tennis title at the 2013 French Open. It was his second French Open singles title.

== Seeds ==
1. (Japan) Shingo Kunieda (final)
2. (France) Stéphane Houdet (champion)

== Draw ==
Key

- Q = Qualifier
- WC = Wild card
- LL = Lucky loser
- Alt = Alternate
- ITF = ITF entry
- PR = Protected ranking
- SR = Special ranking
- SE = Special exempt
- JE = Junior exempt
- JR = Junior Accelerator Programme entrant
- CO = College Accelerator Programme entrant
- NG = Next Gen Accelerator Program entrant
- w/o = Walkover
- r = Retired
- d = Defaulted

=== Finals ===
Quarterfinals
1	(Japan) Shingo Kunieda	6	6
(Sweden) Stefan Olsson	0	1
(Netherlands) Ronald Vink	3	6^{6}
(Netherlands) Maikel Scheffers	6	7^{8}
(France) Michaël Jérémiasz	6	4	5
(United Kingdom) Gordon Reid	2	6	7
(Argentina) Gustavo Fernández	3	6	0
2	(France) Stéphane Houdet	6	4	6

Semifinals
1	(Japan) Shingo Kunieda	6	6
(Netherlands) Maikel Scheffers	4	4
(United Kingdom) Gordon Reid	3	4
2	(France) Stéphane Houdet	6	6

Final
1	(Japan) Shingo Kunieda	5	7	6^{5}
2	(France) Stéphane Houdet	7	5	7^{7}

== See also ==
- 2013 French Open
