= 2013 French Open – Wheelchair women's doubles =

Wheelchair women's doubles
- 2013 French Open

Final
- Champion: (Netherlands) Jiske Griffioen (Netherlands) Aniek van Koot
- Runner-up: (Germany) Sabine Ellerbrock (Netherlands) Sharon Walraven
- Score: 6–2, 6–3

Events
| Singles | men | women | | boys | girls |
| Doubles | men | women | mixed | boys | girls |
| WC Singles | men | women | quad |
| WC Doubles | men | women | quad |
| Legends | −45 | 45+ | women |
- French Open

Jiske Griffioen and Aniek van Koot defeated Sabine Ellerbrock and Sharon Walraven in the final, 6–2, 6–3 to win the women's doubles wheelchair tennis title at the 2013 French Open. It was their second step towards an eventual Grand Slam.

Marjolein Buis and Esther Vergeer were the reigning champions, but Vergeer retired from professional wheelchair tennis in February 2013. Buis partnered Lucy Shuker, but was defeated in the semifinals by Ellebrock and Walraven.

== Seeds ==
1. (Netherlands) Jiske Griffioen / (Netherlands) Aniek van Koot (champions)
2. (Netherlands) Marjolein Buis / (United Kingdom) Lucy Shuker (semifinals)

== Draw ==
Key

- Q = Qualifier
- WC = Wild card
- LL = Lucky loser
- Alt = Alternate
- ITF = ITF entry
- PR = Protected ranking
- SR = Special ranking
- SE = Special exempt
- JE = Junior exempt
- JR = Junior Accelerator Programme entrant
- CO = College Accelerator Programme entrant
- NG = Next Gen Accelerator Program entrant
- w/o = Walkover
- r = Retired
- d = Defaulted

=== Finals ===
Semifinals
1 | (Netherlands) Jiske Griffioen (Netherlands) Aniek van Koot | 6 | 6
(Germany) Katharina Krüger (South Africa) Kgothatso Montjane | 1 | 1
(Germany) Sabine Ellerbrock (Netherlands) Sharon Walraven | 6 | 7
2 | (Netherlands) Marjolein Buis (United Kingdom) Lucy Shuker | 4 | 5

Final
1 | (Netherlands) Jiske Griffioen (Netherlands) Aniek van Koot | 6 | 6
(Germany) Sabine Ellerbrock (Netherlands) Sharon Walraven | 2 | 3
