= 2013 French Open – Boys' doubles =

Boys' doubles
- 2013 French Open

Final
- Champions: (United Kingdom) Kyle Edmund (Portugal) Frederico Ferreira Silva
- Runners-up: (Chile) Cristian Garín (Chile) Nicolás Jarry
- Score: 6–3, 6–3

Events
Singles	men	women		boys	girls
Doubles	men	women	mixed	boys	girls
WC Singles	men	women	quad
WC Doubles	men	women	quad
Legends	−45	45+	women
← 2012 ·	French Open	· 2014 →

Andrew Harris and Nick Kyrgios were the defending champions. Kyrgios partnered up with Wayne Montgomery, but lost in the first round, while Harris decided not to participate.
Kyle Edmund and Frederico Ferreira Silva won the title, defeating Cristian Garín and Nicolás Jarry in the final, 6–3, 6–3.

== Seeds ==
1. (Belgium) Clément Geens / (Serbia) Nikola Milojević (first round)
2. (Australia) Nick Kyrgios / (South Africa) Wayne Montgomery (first round)
3. (United Kingdom) Kyle Edmund / (Portugal) Frederico Ferreira Silva (champions)
4. (France) Maxime Hamou / (France) Johan-Sébastien Tatlot (first round)
5. (Chile) Cristian Garín / (Chile) Nicolás Jarry (final)
6. (Italy) Filippo Baldi / (Australia) Harry Bourchier (first round)
7. (Japan) Yoshihito Nishioka / (Peru) Jorge Brian Panta (quarterfinals)
8. (Italy) Gianluigi Quinzi / (Sweden) Elias Ymer (first round)

== Draw ==
=== Key ===
- Q = Qualifier
- WC = Wild card
- LL = Lucky loser
- Alt = Alternate
- SE = Special exempt
- PR = Protected ranking
- ITF = ITF entry
- JE = Junior exempt
- w/o = Walkover
- r = Retired
- d = Defaulted
- SR = Special ranking

=== Finals ===
Semifinals
(France) Benjamin Bonzi (France) Quentin Halys	3	7^{7}	[3]
3	(United Kingdom) Kyle Edmund (Portugal) Frederico Ferreira Silva	6	6^{5}	[10]
5	(Chile) Cristian Garín (Chile) Nicolás Jarry	6	2	[10]
(Germany) Maximilian Marterer (Austria) Lucas Miedler	1	6	[5]

Final
3	(United Kingdom) Kyle Edmund (Portugal) Frederico Ferreira Silva	6	6
5	(Chile) Cristian Garín (Chile) Nicolás Jarry	3	3

=== Top half ===
First round
1	(Belgium) Clément Geens (Serbia) Nikola Milojević	4	6^{8}
(Brazil) Rafael Matos (Brazil) Marcelo Zormann da Silva	6	7^{10}
(Russia) Karen Khachanov (Russia) Roman Safiullin	7^{7}	7^{7}
(Australia) Jay Andrijic (Australia) Bradley Mousley	6^{5}	6^{5}
(France) Benjamin Bonzi (France) Quentin Halys	6^{4}	6	[10]
(Slovakia) Matej Maruščák (Czech Republic) Pavel Staubert	7^{7}	1	[3]
(Egypt) Mazen Osama (Denmark) Simon Friis Søndergaard	6	1	[10]
6	(Italy) Filippo Baldi (Australia) Harry Bourchier	2	6	[7]
3	(United Kingdom) Kyle Edmund (Portugal) Frederico Ferreira Silva	4	6	[13]
(South Korea) Chung Hyeon (South Korea) Lee Duck-hee	6	4	[11]
(Mexico) Lucas Gómez (Japan) Naoki Nakagawa	6	7
(Russia) Andrey Rublev (Germany) Alexander Zverev	1	5
(Canada) Hugo Di Feo (Australia) Omar Jasika	5	5
WC	(France) Paul Cayré (France) Enzo Py	7	7
(United States) Luca Corinteli (United States) Spencer Papa	7	4	[10]
7	(Japan) Yoshihito Nishioka (Peru) Jorge Brian Panta	5	6	[12]

Second round
(Brazil) R Matos (Brazil) M Zormann da Silva	6	6
(Russia) K Khachanov (Russia) R Safiullin	0	2
(France) B Bonzi (France) Q Halys	6	6
(Egypt) M Osama (Denmark) SF Søndergaard	2	1
3	(United Kingdom) K Edmund (Portugal) FF Silva	6	7
(Mexico) L Gómez (Japan) N Nakagawa	2	5
WC	(France) P Cayré (France) E Py	6^{1}	3
7	(Japan) Y Nishioka (Peru) JB Panta	7^{7}	6

Quarterfinals
(Brazil) R Matos (Brazil) M Zormann da Silva	3	3
(France) B Bonzi (France) Q Halys	6	6
3	(United Kingdom) K Edmund (Portugal) FF Silva	7	6
7	(Japan) Y Nishioka (Peru) JB Panta	5	4

Semifinals
(France) B Bonzi (France) Q Halys	3	7^{7}	[3]
3	(United Kingdom) K Edmund (Portugal) FF Silva	6	6^{5}	[10]

=== Bottom half ===
First round
5	(Chile) Cristian Garín (Chile) Nicolás Jarry	7	6
WC	(France) Enzo Couacaud (Austria) Dominic Weidinger	5	1
(United Kingdom) Luke Bambridge (United Kingdom) Cameron Norrie	6	6
(Romania) Luca George Tatomir (China) Zheng Weiqiang	3	3
(South Korea) Hong Seong-chan (South Korea) Kim Young-seok	0	3
(United States) Martin Redlicki (United States) Noah Rubin	6	6
(Japan) Ken Onishi (Japan) Takashi Saito	3	7^{7}	[10]
4	(France) Maxime Hamou (France) Johan-Sébastien Tatlot	6	6^{4}	[7]
8	(Italy) Gianluigi Quinzi (Sweden) Elias Ymer	4	7	[9]
(Germany) Maximilian Marterer (Austria) Lucas Miedler	6	5	[11]
(Serbia) Laslo Đere (Poland) Kamil Majchrzak	6	2	[10]
WC	(France) Maxime Janvier (France) Alexandre Müller	2	6	[5]
WC	(France) Alexandre Favrot (France) Calvin Hemery	7	6^{9}	[10]
(Italy) Matteo Donati (Italy) Stefano Napolitano	5	7^{11}	[6]
(Argentina) Pedro Cachin (Chile) Guillermo Núñez	7	7
2	(Australia) Nick Kyrgios (South Africa) Wayne Montgomery	5	5

Second round
5	(Chile) C Garín (Chile) N Jarry	7^{7}	6
(United Kingdom) L Bambridge (United Kingdom) C Norrie	6^{4}	3
(United States) M Redlicki (United States) N Rubin	4	6	[1]
(Japan) K Onishi (Japan) T Saito	6	4	[10]
(Germany) M Marterer (Austria) L Miedler	6	6
(Serbia) L Đere (Poland) K Majchrzak	3	2
WC	(France) A Favrot (France) C Hemery	7^{7}	7^{7}
(Argentina) P Cachin (Chile) G Núñez	6^{2}	6^{5}

Quarterfinals
5	(Chile) C Garín (Chile) N Jarry	5	7	[10]
(Japan) K Onishi (Japan) T Saito	7	5	[6]
(Germany) M Marterer (Austria) L Miedler	1	6	[10]
WC	(France) A Favrot (France) C Hemery	6	3	[5]

Semifinals
5	(Chile) C Garín (Chile) N Jarry	6	2	[10]
(Germany) M Marterer (Austria) L Miedler	1	6	[5]
