= 2013 French Open – Wheelchair men's doubles =

Wheelchair men's doubles
- 2013 French Open

Final
- Champions: (France) Stéphane Houdet (Japan) Shingo Kunieda
- Runners-up: (United Kingdom) Gordon Reid (Netherlands) Ronald Vink
- Score: 3–6, 6–4, [10–6]

Events
Singles	men	women		boys	girls
Doubles	men	women	mixed	boys	girls
WC Singles	men	women	quad
WC Doubles	men	women	quad
Legends	−45	45+	women
- French Open

Three-time defending champion Shingo Kunieda and his partner Stéphane Houdet defeated Gordon Reid and Ronald Vink in the final, 3–6, 6–4, [10–6] to win the men's doubles wheelchair tennis title at the 2013 French Open.

Frédéric Cattaneo and Kunieda were the reigning champions, but Cattaneo did not compete.

== Seeds ==
1. (France) Stéphane Houdet / (Japan) Shingo Kunieda (champions)
2. (United Kingdom) Gordon Reid / (Netherlands) Ronald Vink (final)

== Draw ==
Key

- Q = Qualifier
- WC = Wild card
- LL = Lucky loser
- Alt = Alternate
- ITF = ITF entry
- PR = Protected ranking
- SR = Special ranking
- SE = Special exempt
- JE = Junior exempt
- JR = Junior Accelerator Programme entrant
- CO = College Accelerator Programme entrant
- NG = Next Gen Accelerator Program entrant
- w/o = Walkover
- r = Retired
- d = Defaulted

=== Finals ===
Semifinals
1	(France) Stéphane Houdet (Japan) Shingo Kunieda	6	5	[10]
(France) Michaël Jérémiasz (Netherlands) Maikel Scheffers	4	7	[8]
(Argentina) Gustavo Fernández (Sweden) Stefan Olsson	1	5
2	(United Kingdom) Gordon Reid (Netherlands) Ronald Vink	6	7

Final
1	(France) Stéphane Houdet (Japan) Shingo Kunieda	3	6	[10]
2	(United Kingdom) Gordon Reid (Netherlands) Ronald Vink	6	4	[6]
