= 2013 French Open – Girls' singles =

Girls' singles
- 2013 French Open

Final
- Champion: (Switzerland) Belinda Bencic
- Runner-up: (Germany) Antonia Lottner
- Score: 6–1, 6–3

Events
Singles	men	women		boys	girls
Doubles	men	women	mixed	boys	girls
WC Singles	men	women	quad
WC Doubles	men	women	quad
Legends	−45	45+	women
← 2012 ·	French Open	· 2014 →

Annika Beck was the 2012 champion, but was no longer eligible to compete in junior tennis, and thus couldn't defend her title.

Belinda Bencic won her first junior grand slam, defeating doubles partner Antonia Lottner in the final, 6–1, 6–3.

== Seeds ==
1. (Croatia) Ana Konjuh (semifinals)
2. (Switzerland) Belinda Bencic (champion)
3. (Czech Republic) Kateřina Siniaková (first round)
4. (Russia) Varvara Flink (first round)
5. (Germany) Antonia Lottner (final)
6. (Russia) Darya Kasatkina (quarterfinals)
7. (United Kingdom) Katy Dunne (second round)
8. (Chinese Taipei) Hsu Ching-wen (first round)
9. (Paraguay) Camila Giangreco Campiz (first round)
10. (Switzerland) Karin Kennel (first round)
11. (United States) Taylor Townsend (quarterfinals)
12. (United States) Christina Makarova (first round)
13. (Czech Republic) Barbora Krejčíková (second round)
14. (Canada) Carol Zhao (third round)
15. (Estonia) Anett Kontaveit (first round)
16. (Turkey) İpek Soylu (first round)

== Main draw ==
=== Key ===
- Q = Qualifier
- WC = Wild card
- LL = Lucky loser
- Alt = Alternate
- SE = Special exempt
- PR = Protected ranking
- ITF = ITF entry
- JE = Junior exempt
- w/o = Walkover
- r = Retired
- d = Defaulted
- SR = Special ranking

=== Finals ===
Quarterfinals
1	(Croatia) Ana Konjuh	3	7^{8}	6
6	(Russia) Darya Kasatkina	6	6^{6}	4
(Russia) Elizaveta Kulichkova	7^{7}	5	4
5	(Germany) Antonia Lottner	6^{4}	7	6
SE	(United States) Louisa Chirico	6	6
Q	(Slovakia) Kristína Schmiedlová	0	2
11	(United States) Taylor Townsend	6	2	7
2	(Switzerland) Belinda Bencic	2	6	9

Semifinals
1	(Croatia) Ana Konjuh	0	1
5	(Germany) Antonia Lottner	6	6
SE	(United States) Louisa Chirico	5	6	3
2	(Switzerland) Belinda Bencic	7	3	6

Final
5	(Germany) Antonia Lottner	1	3
2	(Switzerland) Belinda Bencic	6	6

=== Top half ===
==== Section 1 ====
First round
1	(Croatia) Ana Konjuh	6	6
(United Kingdom) Katie Boulter	2	4
(United States) Jamie Loeb	7^{9}	6
(Serbia) Nina Stojanović	6^{7}	3
(Slovakia) Petra Uberalová	6	6
WC	(France) Solène Guyomard	4	1
(Russia) Veronika Kudermetova	2	6	6
16	(Turkey) İpek Soylu	6	2	3
10	(Switzerland) Karin Kennel	4	7	4
WC	(France) Margot Yerolymos	6	5	6
LL	(Italy) Beatrice Lombardo	6	6
Q	(Belarus) Iryna Shymanovich	0	2
(Romania) Ioana Ducu	3	1
(Kazakhstan) Anna Danilina	6	6
(Czech Republic) Gabriela Pantůčková	2	6	3
6	(Russia) Darya Kasatkina	6	2	6

Second round
1	(Croatia) A Konjuh	7	6
(United States) J Loeb	5	4
(Slovakia) P Uberalová	6	6
(Russia) V Kudermetova	2	4
WC	(France) M Yerolymos	6	6
LL	(Italy) B Lombardo	2	2
(Kazakhstan) A Danilina	5	2
6	(Russia) D Kasatkina	7	6

Third round
1	(Croatia) A Konjuh	6^{1}	6	6
(Slovakia) P Uberalová	7^{7}	4	4
WC	(France) M Yerolymos	3	3
6	(Russia) D Kasatkina	6	6

Quarterfinals
1	(Croatia) A Konjuh	3	7^{8}	6
6	(Russia) D Kasatkina	6	6^{6}	4

==== Section 2 ====
First round
3	(Czech Republic) Kateřina Siniaková	2	4
(Russia) Elizaveta Kulichkova	6	6
(Brazil) Carolina Alves	2	2
(Ecuador) Doménica González	6	6
(Argentina) Constanza Vega	4	4
WC	(France) Océane Dodin	6	6
(Hong Kong) Katherine Ip	0	1
14	(Canada) Carol Zhao	6	6
12	(United States) Christina Makarova	1	3
Q	(Switzerland) Chiara Grimm	6	6
Q	(Russia) Alina Silich	1	3
(Japan) Ayaka Okuno	6	6
WC	(France) Carla Touly	5	0
SE	(Ukraine) Anhelina Kalinina	7	6
(Mexico) Alejandra Cisneros	6	1	5
5	(Germany) Antonia Lottner	4	6	7

Second round
(Russia) E Kulichkova	6	6
(Ecuador) D González	4	3
WC	(France) O Dodin	5	3
14	(Canada) C Zhao	7	6
Q	(Switzerland) C Grimm	3	4
(Japan) A Okuno	6	6
SE	(Ukraine) A Kalinina	3	4
5	(Germany) A Lottner	6	6

Third round
(Russia) E Kulichkova	6	2	9
14	(Canada) C Zhao	3	6	7
(Japan) A Okuno	7^{8}	4	1
5	(Germany) A Lottner	6^{6}	6	6

Quarterfinals
(Russia) E Kulichkova	7^{7}	5	4
5	(Germany) A Lottner	6^{4}	7	6

=== Bottom half ===
==== Section 3 ====
First round
7	(United Kingdom) Katy Dunne	6	6
(Croatia) Adrijana Lekaj	2	2
WC	(France) Jade Suvrijn	1	2
Q	(Spain) Sara Sorribes Tormo	6	6
(Russia) Maria Marfutina	6	6
(Austria) Barbara Haas	2	2
SE	(United States) Louisa Chirico	6	2	6
9	(Paraguay) Camila Giangreco Campiz	2	6	2
15	(Estonia) Anett Kontaveit	4	6^{3}
(Romania) Ilka Csöregi	6	7^{7}
WC	(France) Estelle Cascino	6	6
(Japan) Hikari Yamamoto	1	2
(Egypt) Sandra Samir	5	6	6
(Ukraine) Helen Ploskina	7	3	3
Q	(Slovakia) Kristína Schmiedlová	6	6
4	(Russia) Varvara Flink	4	2

Second round
7	(United Kingdom) K Dunne	7	5	3
Q	(Spain) S Sorribes Tormo	5	7	6
(Russia) M Marfutina	6^{9}	2
SE	(United States) L Chirico	7^{11}	6
(Romania) I Csöregi	7^{9}	7^{7}
WC	(France) E Cascino	6^{7}	6^{2}
(Egypt) S Samir	2	6	2
Q	(Slovakia) K Schmiedlová	6	1	6

Third round
Q	(Spain) S Sorribes Tormo	6	5	0
SE	(United States) L Chirico	3	7	6
(Romania) I Csöregi	6^{4}	6	4
Q	(Slovakia) K Schmiedlová	7^{7}	3	6

Quarterfinals
SE	(United States) L Chirico	6	6
Q	(Slovakia) K Schmiedlová	0	2

==== Section 4 ====
First round
8	(Chinese Taipei) Hsu Ching-wen	2	6^{2}
(Mexico) Victoria Rodríguez	6	7^{7}
(Russia) Anastasiya Komardina	6	3	3
WC	(France) Alice Bacquié	3	6	6
(Australia) Sara Tomic	5	3
Q	(Croatia) Jana Fett	7	6
Q	(Ukraine) Viktoriya Lushkova	4	1
11	(United States) Taylor Townsend	6	6
13	(Czech Republic) Barbora Krejčíková	6	6
(Colombia) Laura Ucrós	2	0
(Brazil) Beatriz Haddad Maia	6	6
WC	(France) Théo Gravouil	1	2
Q	(Canada) Erin Routliffe	2	1
(France) Fiona Ferro	6	6
(Italy) Alice Matteucci	2	5
2	(Switzerland) Belinda Bencic	6	7

Second round
(Mexico) V Rodríguez	6	6
WC	(France) A Bacquié	4	1
Q	(Croatia) J Fett	4	2
11	(United States) T Townsend	6	6
13	(Czech Republic) B Krejčíková	6	4	3
(Brazil) B Haddad Maia	3	6	6
(France) F Ferro	3	0
2	(Switzerland) B Bencic	6	6

Third round
(Mexico) V Rodríguez	2	3
11	(United States) T Townsend	6	6
(Brazil) B Haddad Maia	3	6	1
2	(Switzerland) B Bencic	6	4	6

Quarterfinals
11	(United States) T Townsend	6	2	7
2	(Switzerland) B Bencic	2	6	9
