= 2013 French Open – Wheelchair women's singles =

Wheelchair women's singles
- 2013 French Open

Final
- Champion: (Germany) Sabine Ellerbrock
- Runner-up: (Netherlands) Jiske Griffioen
- Score: 6–3, 3–6, 6–1

Events
Singles	men	women		boys	girls
Doubles	men	women	mixed	boys	girls
WC Singles	men	women	quad
WC Doubles	men	women	quad
Legends	−45	45+	women
- French Open

Sabine Ellerbrock defeated Jiske Griffioen in the final, 6–3, 3–6, 6–1 to win the women's singles wheelchair tennis title at the 2013 French Open.

Esther Vergeer was the six-time reigning champion, but retired from professional wheelchair tennis in February 2013. Since Vergeer had won every edition of the event since its creation in 2007, a new French Open singles champion was guaranteed.

== Seeds ==
1. (Netherlands) Aniek van Koot (semifinals)
2. (Netherlands) Jiske Griffioen (final)

== Draw ==
Key

- Q = Qualifier
- WC = Wild card
- LL = Lucky loser
- Alt = Alternate
- ITF = ITF entry
- PR = Protected ranking
- SR = Special ranking
- SE = Special exempt
- JE = Junior exempt
- JR = Junior Accelerator Programme entrant
- CO = College Accelerator Programme entrant
- NG = Next Gen Accelerator Program entrant
- w/o = Walkover
- r = Retired
- d = Defaulted

=== Finals ===
Quarterfinals
1	(Netherlands) Aniek van Koot	4	6	6
(United Kingdom) Lucy Shuker	6	4	4
(Germany) Katharina Krüger	4	4
(Germany) Sabine Ellerbrock	6	6
(South Africa) Kgothatso Montjane	7	1	6
(Netherlands) Sharon Walraven	6^{5}	6	4
(Netherlands) Marjolein Buis	1	7	4
2	(Netherlands) Jiske Griffioen	6	5	6

Semifinals
1	(Netherlands) Aniek van Koot	4	4
(Germany) Sabine Ellerbrock	6	6
(South Africa) Kgothatso Montjane	1	3
2	(Netherlands) Jiske Griffioen	6	6

Final
(Germany) Sabine Ellerbrock	6	3	6
2	(Netherlands) Jiske Griffioen	3	6	1
