= 2013 French Open – Legends over 45 doubles =

Legends over 45 doubles
- 2013 French Open

Final
- Champion: (Ecuador) Andrés Gómez (Australia) Mark Woodforde
- Runner-up: (Iran) Mansour Bahrami (Australia) Pat Cash
- Score: 6–1, 7–6^{(7–2)}

Events
Singles	men	women		boys	girls
Doubles	men	women	mixed	boys	girls
WC Singles	men	women	quad
WC Doubles	men	women	quad
Legends	−45	45+	women
← 2012 ·	French Open	· 2014 →

John McEnroe and Patrick McEnroe were the defending champions, but Patrick McEnroe did not participate.
John McEnroe played alongside Adriano Panatta, but lost in the group stage.
Andrés Gómez and Mark Woodforde won the title, defeating Mansour Bahrami and Pat Cash in the final, 6–1, 7–6^{(7–2)}.

== Draw ==
=== Key ===
- Q = Qualifier
- WC = Wild card
- LL = Lucky loser
- Alt = Alternate
- ITF = ITF entry
- PR = Protected ranking
- SR = Special ranking
- SE = Special exempt
- JE = Junior exempt
- JR = Junior Accelerator Programme entrant
- CO = College Accelerator Programme entrant
- NG = Next Gen Accelerator Program entrant
- w/o = Walkover
- r = Retired
- d = Defaulted

=== Final ===
Final
1	(Iran) Mansour Bahrami (Australia) Pat Cash	1	6^{2}
2	(Ecuador) Andrés Gómez (Australia) Mark Woodforde	6	7^{7}

=== Group C ===
		(France) Forget (France) Leconte	(Sweden) Pernfors (Sweden) Wilander	(Iran) Bahrami (Australia) Cash	RR; W–L	Set; W–L	Game; W–L	Standings
C1	(France) Guy Forget (France) Henri Leconte		1–6, 6–4, [10–7]	7–5, 2–6, [7–10]	1–1	3–3	17–22	2
C2	(Sweden) Mikael Pernfors (Sweden) Mats Wilander	6–1, 4–6, [7–10]		6–4, 4–6, [7–10]	0–2	2–4	20–19	3
C3	(Iran) Mansour Bahrami (Australia) Pat Cash	5–7, 6–2, [10–7]	4–6, 6–4, [10–7]		2–0	4–2	23–19	1

Standings are determined by: 1. number of wins; 2. number of matches; 3. in three-players-ties, percentage of sets won, or of games won; 4. steering-committee decision.

=== Group D ===
		(United States) McEnroe (Italy) Panatta	(Australia) McNamara (Germany) Stich	(Ecuador) Gómez (Australia) Woodforde	RR; W–L	Set; W–L	Game; W–L	Standings
D1	(United States) John McEnroe (Italy) Adriano Panatta		6–3, 3–6, [10–2]	4–6, 3–6	1–1	2–2	17–21	2
D2	(Australia) Peter McNamara (Germany) Michael Stich	3–6, 6–3, [2–10]		3–6, 3–6	0–2	1–4	15–22	3
D3	(Ecuador) Andrés Gómez (Australia) Mark Woodforde	6–4, 6–3	6–3, 6–3		2–0	4–0	24–13	1

Standings are determined by: 1. number of wins; 2. number of matches; 3. in three-players-ties, percentage of sets won, or of games won; 4. steering-committee decision.
