= 2013 French Open – Women's legends doubles =

Women's legends doubles
- 2013 French Open

Final
- Champion: (United States) Lindsay Davenport (Switzerland) Martina Hingis
- Runner-up: (Russia) Elena Dementieva (United States) Martina Navratilova
- Score: 6–4, 6–2

Events
Singles	men	women		boys	girls
Doubles	men	women	mixed	boys	girls
WC Singles	men	women	quad
WC Doubles	men	women	quad
Legends	−45	45+	women
← 2012 ·	French Open	· 2014 →

Lindsay Davenport and Martina Hingis successfully defended their title by defeating Elena Dementieva and Martina Navratilova 6–4, 6–2 in the final.

== Draw ==
=== Key ===
- Q = Qualifier
- WC = Wild card
- LL = Lucky loser
- Alt = Alternate
- ITF = ITF entry
- PR = Protected ranking
- SR = Special ranking
- SE = Special exempt
- JE = Junior exempt
- JR = Junior Accelerator Programme entrant
- CO = College Accelerator Programme entrant
- NG = Next Gen Accelerator Program entrant
- w/o = Walkover
- r = Retired
- d = Defaulted

=== Final ===
Final
1	(United States) Lindsay Davenport (Switzerland) Martina Hingis	6	6
2	(Russia) Elena Dementieva (United States) Martina Navratilova	4	2

=== Group A ===
		(United States) Davenport (Switzerland) Hingis	(Czech Republic) Novotná (Austria) Schett	(France) Tauziat (France) Testud	RR; W–L	Set; W–L	Game; W–L	Standings
A1	(United States) Lindsay Davenport (Switzerland) Martina Hingis		6–4, 6–3	6–2, 6–2	2–0	4–0	24–11	1
A2	(Czech Republic) Jana Novotná (Austria) Barbara Schett	4–6, 3–6		3–6, 6–1, [7–10]	0–2	1–4	16–20	3
A3	(France) Nathalie Tauziat (France) Sandrine Testud	2–6, 2–6	6–3, 1–6, [10–7]		1–1	2–3	12–21	2

Standings are determined by: 1. number of wins; 2. number of matches; 3. in three-players-ties, percentage of sets won, or of games won; 4. steering-committee decision.

=== Group B ===
		(Russia) Dementieva (United States) Navratilova	(United States) Fernandez (Spain) Sánchez Vicario	(Croatia) Majoli (Spain) Martínez	RR; W–L	Set; W–L	Game; W–L	Standings
B1	(Russia) Elena Dementieva (United States) Martina Navratilova		6–4, 6–3	6–2, 6–4	2–0	4–0	24–13	1
B2	(United States) Mary Joe Fernandez (Spain) Arantxa Sánchez Vicario	4–6, 3–6		w/o	0–2	0–2	7–12	3
B3	(Croatia) Iva Majoli (Spain) Conchita Martínez	2–6, 4–6	w/o		1–1	0–2	6–12	2

Standings are determined by: 1. number of wins; 2. number of matches; 3. in three-players-ties, percentage of sets won, or of games won; 4. steering-committee decision.
