= 2013 French Open – Mixed doubles =

Mixed doubles
- 2013 French Open

Final
- Champions: (Czech Republic) Lucie Hradecká (Czech Republic) František Čermák
- Runners-up: (France) Kristina Mladenovic (Canada) Daniel Nestor
- Score: 1–6, 6–4, [10–6]

Details
- Draw: 32
- Seeds: 8

Events
Singles	men	women		boys	girls
Doubles	men	women	mixed	boys	girls
WC Singles	men	women	quad
WC Doubles	men	women	quad
Legends	−45	45+	women
- French Open

Sania Mirza and Mahesh Bhupathi were the defending champions, but decided not to participate together.
Mirza played alongside Robert Lindstedt, but lost in the first round to Cara Black and Aisam-ul-Haq Qureshi, while Bhupathi competed with Casey Dellacqua, but lost to Anastasia Rodionova and Santiago González in the first round.
Lucie Hradecká and František Čermák won the title, defeating Kristina Mladenovic and Daniel Nestor in the final, 1–6, 6–4, [10–6].

== Seeds ==
1. (India) Sania Mirza / (Sweden) Robert Lindstedt (first round)
2. (Russia) Elena Vesnina / (Belarus) Max Mirnyi (first round)
3. (Slovenia) Katarina Srebotnik / (Serbia) Nenad Zimonjić (quarterfinals)
4. (United States) Lisa Raymond / (Brazil) Bruno Soares (quarterfinals)
5. (France) Kristina Mladenovic / (Canada) Daniel Nestor (final)
6. (Germany) Anna-Lena Grönefeld / (Romania) Horia Tecău (second round)
7. (Australia) Casey Dellacqua / (India) Mahesh Bhupathi (first round)
8. (United States) Liezel Huber / (Brazil) Marcelo Melo (semifinals)

== Main draw ==
Key

- Q = Qualifier
- WC = Wild card
- LL = Lucky loser
- Alt = Alternate
- ITF = ITF entry
- PR = Protected ranking
- SR = Special ranking
- SE = Special exempt
- JE = Junior exempt
- JR = Junior Accelerator Programme entrant
- CO = College Accelerator Programme entrant
- NG = Next Gen Accelerator Program entrant
- w/o = Walkover
- r = Retired
- d = Defaulted

=== Finals ===
Semifinals
(Zimbabwe) Cara Black (Pakistan) Aisam-ul-Haq Qureshi	5	4
5	(France) Kristina Mladenovic (Canada) Daniel Nestor	7	6
8	(United States) Liezel Huber (Brazil) Marcelo Melo	6	2	[3]
(Czech Republic) Lucie Hradecká (Czech Republic) František Čermák	3	6	[10]

Final
5	(France) Kristina Mladenovic (Canada) Daniel Nestor	6	4	[6]
(Czech Republic) Lucie Hradecká (Czech Republic) František Čermák	1	6	[10]

=== Top half ===
First round
1	(India) S Mirza (Sweden) R Lindstedt	2	3
(Zimbabwe) C Black (Pakistan) A-u-H Qureshi	6	6
(Romania) S Cîrstea (Spain) D Marrero	6^{5}	4
(Chinese Taipei) S-w Hsieh (Denmark) F Nielsen	7^{7}	6
(Russia) N Petrova (Colombia) JS Cabal	6	7
(Luxembourg) M Minella (Austria) A Peya	4	5
(Australia) A Rodionova (Mexico) S González	6	1	[11]
7	(Australia) C Dellacqua (India) M Bhupathi	4	6	[9]
3	(Slovenia) K Srebotnik (Serbia) N Zimonjić	6	7
WC	(France) C Garcia (France) M Gicquel	2	5
(United Kingdom) H Watson (United Kingdom) J Marray	4	7^{10}	[12]
WC	(France) A Lim (France) J Chardy	6	6^{8}	[14]
(China) S Zhang (Austria) J Knowle	6	6
(United States) R Kops-Jones (Philippines) TC Huey	1	2
(United States) A Spears (United States) S Lipsky	2	4
5	(France) K Mladenovic (Canada) D Nestor	6	6

Second round
(Zimbabwe) C Black (Pakistan) A-u-H Qureshi	6	6
(Chinese Taipei) S-w Hsieh (Denmark) F Nielsen	4	0
(Russia) N Petrova (Colombia) JS Cabal	6	6
(Australia) A Rodionova (Mexico) S González	3	2
3	(Slovenia) K Srebotnik (Serbia) N Zimonjić	6	7^{7}
WC	(France) A Lim (France) J Chardy	2	6^{5}
(China) S Zhang (Austria) J Knowle	3	5
5	(France) K Mladenovic (Canada) D Nestor	6	7

Quarterfinals
(Zimbabwe) C Black (Pakistan) A-u-H Qureshi	7^{7}	6
(Russia) N Petrova (Colombia) JS Cabal	6^{5}	3
3	(Slovenia) K Srebotnik (Serbia) N Zimonjić	5	4
5	(France) K Mladenovic (Canada) D Nestor	7	6

Semifinals
(Zimbabwe) C Black (Pakistan) A-u-H Qureshi	5	4
5	(France) K Mladenovic (Canada) D Nestor	7	6

=== Bottom half ===
First round
8	(United States) L Huber (Brazil) M Melo	0	7	[11]
WC	(France) S Beltrame (France) B Paire	6	5	[9]
(Serbia) J Janković (India) L Paes	7	6
(Kazakhstan) G Voskoboeva (Italy) D Bracciali	5	3
(Czech Republic) K Peschke (Poland) M Matkowski	6	1	[8]
(Czech Republic) A Hlaváčková (Czech Republic) L Dlouhý	3	6	[10]
WC	(France) S Foretz Gacon (France) É Roger-Vasselin	5	3
4	(United States) L Raymond (Brazil) B Soares	7	6
6	(Germany) A-L Grönefeld (Romania) H Tecău	6	1	[10]
WC	(France) J Coin (France) N Mahut	3	6	[5]
(Belgium) K Flipkens (United Kingdom) C Fleming	4	5
Alt	(South Africa) N Grandin (Slovakia) F Polášek	6	7
(Czech Republic) L Hradecká (Czech Republic) F Čermák	6	6
(Australia) A Barty (India) R Bopanna	4	4
(Slovakia) D Hantuchová (Netherlands) J-J Rojer	0	6	[10]
2	(Russia) E Vesnina (Belarus) M Mirnyi	6	0	[6]

Second round
8	(United States) L Huber (Brazil) M Melo	7	6^{1}	[10]
(Serbia) J Janković (India) L Paes	5	7^{7}	[2]
(Czech Republic) A Hlaváčková (Czech Republic) L Dlouhý	2	6	[12]
4	(United States) L Raymond (Brazil) B Soares	6	4	[14]
6	(Germany) A-L Grönefeld (Romania) H Tecău	6	0	[7]
Alt	(South Africa) N Grandin (Slovakia) F Polášek	1	6	[10]
(Czech Republic) L Hradecká (Czech Republic) F Čermák	7^{7}	6
(Slovakia) D Hantuchová (Netherlands) J-J Rojer	6^{5}	2

Quarterfinals
8	(United States) L Huber (Brazil) M Melo	6	6
4	(United States) L Raymond (Brazil) B Soares	4	4
Alt	(South Africa) N Grandin (Slovakia) F Polášek	6^{3}	6	[5]
(Czech Republic) L Hradecká (Czech Republic) F Čermák	7^{7}	3	[10]

Semifinals
8	(United States) L Huber (Brazil) M Melo	6	2	[3]
(Czech Republic) L Hradecká (Czech Republic) F Čermák	3	6	[10]
