= 2013 French Open – Legends under 45 doubles =

Legends under 45 doubles
- 2013 French Open

Final
- Champion: (France) Cédric Pioline (France) Fabrice Santoro
- Runner-up: (Spain) Albert Costa (Spain) Carlos Moyá
- Score: 4–6, 6–4, [4–1] ret.

Events
Singles	men	women		boys	girls
Doubles	men	women	mixed	boys	girls
WC Singles	men	women	quad
WC Doubles	men	women	quad
Legends	−45	45+	women
← 2012 ·	French Open	· 2014 →

Albert Costa and Carlos Moyá were the defending champions, but retired in the deciding tiebreak in the final against Cédric Pioline and Fabrice Santoro.

== Draw ==
=== Key ===
- Q = Qualifier
- WC = Wild card
- LL = Lucky loser
- Alt = Alternate
- ITF = ITF entry
- PR = Protected ranking
- SR = Special ranking
- SE = Special exempt
- JE = Junior exempt
- JR = Junior Accelerator Programme entrant
- CO = College Accelerator Programme entrant
- NG = Next Gen Accelerator Program entrant
- w/o = Walkover
- r = Retired
- d = Defaulted

=== Final ===
Final
1	(France) Cédric Pioline (France) Fabrice Santoro	4	6	[4]
2	(Spain) Albert Costa (Spain) Carlos Moyá	6	4	[1]^{r}

=== Group A ===
		(France) Pioline (France) Santoro	(Spain) Bruguera (Netherlands) Krajicek	(United States) Chang (Ukraine) Medvedev	RR; W–L	Set; W–L	Game; W–L	Standings
A1	(France) Cédric Pioline (France) Fabrice Santoro		6–2, 6–4	7–6^{(10–8)}, 6–4	2–0	4–0	25–16	1
A2	(Spain) Sergi Bruguera (Netherlands) Richard Krajicek	2–6, 4–6		4–6, 7–6^{(9–7)}, [10–3]	1–1	2–3	18–24	2
A3	(United States) Michael Chang (Ukraine) Andrei Medvedev	6–7^{(8–10)}, 4–6	6–4, 6–7^{(7–9)}, [3–10]		0–2	1–4	22–25	3

Standings are determined by: 1. number of wins; 2. number of matches; 3. in three-players-ties, percentage of sets won, or of games won; 4. steering-committee decision.

=== Group B ===
		(Sweden) Enqvist (France) Grosjean	(Spain) Costa (Spain) Moyá	(Argentina) Gaudio (Croatia) Ivanišević	RR; W–L	Set; W–L	Game; W–L	Standings
B1	(Sweden) Thomas Enqvist (France) Sébastien Grosjean		0–6, 4–6	7–5, 6–3	1–1	2–2	17–20	2
B2	(Spain) Albert Costa (Spain) Carlos Moyá	6–0, 6–4		4–6, 6–2, [10–7]	2–0	4–1	23–12	1
B3	(Argentina) Gastón Gaudio (Croatia) Goran Ivanišević	5–7, 3–6	6–4, 2–6, [7–10]		0–2	1–4	16–24	3

Standings are determined by: 1. number of wins; 2. number of matches; 3. in three-players-ties, percentage of sets won, or of games won; 4. steering-committee decision.
