= 2013 French Open – Men's doubles =

Men's doubles
- 2013 French Open

Final
- Champions: (United States) Bob Bryan (United States) Mike Bryan
- Runners-up: (France) Michaël Llodra (France) Nicolas Mahut
- Score: 6–4, 4–6, 7–6^{(7–4)}

Details
- Draw: 64
- Seeds: 16

Events
| Singles | men | women | | boys | girls |
| Doubles | men | women | mixed | boys | girls |
| WC Singles | men | women | quad |
| WC Doubles | men | women | quad |
| Legends | −45 | 45+ | women |
| ← 2012 · | French Open | · 2014 → |

Bob and Mike Bryan defeated Michaël Llodra and Nicolas Mahut in the final, 6–4, 4–6, 7–6^{(7–4)} to win the men's doubles tennis title at the 2013 French Open. With the win, the Bryan brothers completed the double career Grand Slam.

Max Mirnyi and Daniel Nestor were the defending champions, but chose not to compete together. Mirnyi partnered Horia Tecău, but lost in the second round to Llodra and Mahut. Nestor partnered Robert Lindstedt, but lost in the second round to Jonathan Dasnières de Veigy and Florent Serra.

== Seeds ==
1. (United States) Bob Bryan / (United States) Mike Bryan (champions)
2. (Spain) Marcel Granollers / (Spain) Marc López (quarterfinals)
3. (Sweden) Robert Lindstedt / (Canada) Daniel Nestor (second round)
4. (India) Mahesh Bhupathi / (India) Rohan Bopanna (first round)
5. (Belarus) Max Mirnyi / (Romania) Horia Tecău (second round)
6. (Pakistan) Aisam-ul-Haq Qureshi / (Netherlands) Jean-Julien Rojer (third round)
7. (Austria) Alexander Peya / (Brazil) Bruno Soares (semifinals)
8. (Spain) David Marrero / (Spain) Fernando Verdasco (quarterfinals)
9. (Austria) Jürgen Melzer / (India) Leander Paes (second round)
10. (United Kingdom) Colin Fleming / (United Kingdom) Jonathan Marray (first round)
11. (Mexico) Santiago González / (United States) Scott Lipsky (first round)
12. (Croatia) Ivan Dodig / (Brazil) Marcelo Melo (third round)
13. (France) Julien Benneteau / (Serbia) Nenad Zimonjić (second round)
14. (Italy) Daniele Bracciali / (Italy) Fabio Fognini (first round)
15. (Austria) Julian Knowle / (Slovakia) Filip Polášek (first round)
16. (Poland) Mariusz Fyrstenberg / (Poland) Marcin Matkowski (quarterfinals, retired because of Fyrstenberg's back injury)

== Main draw ==
=== Key ===
- Q = Qualifier
- WC = Wild card
- LL = Lucky loser
- Alt = Alternate
- ITF = ITF entry
- PR = Protected ranking
- SR = Special ranking
- SE = Special exempt
- JE = Junior exempt
- JR = Junior Accelerator Programme entrant
- CO = College Accelerator Programme entrant
- NG = Next Gen Accelerator Program entrant
- w/o = Walkover
- r = Retired
- d = Defaulted

=== Finals ===
Quarterfinals
1 | (United States) Bob Bryan (United States) Mike Bryan | 6 | 6
8 | (Spain) David Marrero (Spain) Fernando Verdasco | 3 | 4
16 | (Poland) Mariusz Fyrstenberg (Poland) Marcin Matkowski | 6 | 4 | 1^{r}
7 | (Austria) Alexander Peya (Brazil) Bruno Soares | 1 | 6 | 3
(Uruguay) Pablo Cuevas (Argentina) Horacio Zeballos | 7^{7} | 4 | 6
(Poland) Tomasz Bednarek (Poland) Jerzy Janowicz | 6^{3} | 6 | 1
(France) Michaël Llodra (France) Nicolas Mahut | 6 | 1 | 6
2 | (Spain) Marcel Granollers (Spain) Marc López | 3 | 6 | 3

Semifinals
1 | (United States) Bob Bryan (United States) Mike Bryan | 6 | 6
7 | (Austria) Alexander Peya (Brazil) Bruno Soares | 1 | 4
(Uruguay) Pablo Cuevas (Argentina) Horacio Zeballos | 6^{4} | 2
(France) Michaël Llodra (France) Nicolas Mahut | 7^{7} | 6

Final
1 | (United States) Bob Bryan (United States) Mike Bryan | 6 | 4 | 7^{7}
(France) Michaël Llodra (France) Nicolas Mahut | 4 | 6 | 6^{4}

=== Top half ===
==== Section 1 ====
First round
1 | (United States) B Bryan (United States) M Bryan | 6 | 6
WC | (France) J Eysseric (France) F Martin | 3 | 4
(United States) E Butorac (United States) J Sock | 6 | 6
(Slovakia) M Kližan (Slovakia) I Zelenay | 4 | 4
(Netherlands) R Haase (Netherlands) I Sijsling | 7^{7} | 4 | 3
(Germany) C Kas (Austria) O Marach | 6^{5} | 6 | 6
(Spain) P Andújar (Spain) T Robredo | 6 | 3 | 3
13 | (France) J Benneteau (Serbia) N Zimonjić | 4 | 6 | 6
10 | (United Kingdom) C Fleming (United Kingdom) J Marray | 6^{4} | 7^{7} | 5
(Spain) F López (Brazil) A Sá | 7^{7} | 6^{3} | 7
(Germany) P Marx (Romania) F Mergea | 6 | 7^{7}
WC | (France) G Monfils (France) J Ouanna | 3 | 6^{4}
(Czech Republic) F Čermák (Slovakia) M Mertiňák | 6 | 2
(Germany) B Becker (Germany) P Petzschner | 2 | 1^{r}
(Sweden) J Brunström (South Africa) R Klaasen | 3 | 2
8 | (Spain) D Marrero (Spain) F Verdasco | 6 | 6

Second round
1 | (United States) B Bryan (United States) M Bryan | 7 | 7^{7}
(United States) E Butorac (United States) J Sock | 5 | 6^{2}
(Germany) C Kas (Austria) O Marach | 6 | 5 | 6
13 | (France) J Benneteau (Serbia) N Zimonjić | 4 | 7 | 1
(Spain) F López (Brazil) A Sá | 6 | 3 | 7^{7}
(Germany) P Marx (Romania) F Mergea | 2 | 6 | 6^{5}
(Czech Republic) F Čermák (Slovakia) M Mertiňák | 6^{5} | 3
8 | (Spain) D Marrero (Spain) F Verdasco | 7^{7} | 6

Third round
1 | (United States) B Bryan (United States) M Bryan | 1
(Germany) C Kas (Austria) O Marach | 0^{r}
(Spain) F López (Brazil) A Sá | 2 | 2
8 | (Spain) D Marrero (Spain) F Verdasco | 6 | 6

Quarterfinals
1 | (United States) B Bryan (United States) M Bryan | 6 | 6
8 | (Spain) D Marrero (Spain) F Verdasco | 3 | 4

==== Section 2 ====
First round
3 | (Sweden) R Lindstedt (Canada) D Nestor | 7^{10} | 7^{7}
(Ukraine) S Stakhovsky (Russia) M Youzhny | 6^{8} | 6^{4}
(Australia) M Matosevic (Australia) J-P Smith | 6^{4} | 6^{6}
WC | (France) J Dasnières de Veigy (France) F Serra | 7^{7} | 7^{8}
(Germany) A Begemann (Germany) M Emmrich | 6 | 4 | 6
(Spain) G García-López (Spain) A Ramos | 3 | 6 | 3
(Czech Republic) J Hájek (Czech Republic) R Štěpánek | 5 | 3
16 | (Poland) M Fyrstenberg (Poland) M Matkowski | 7 | 6
12 | (Croatia) I Dodig (Brazil) M Melo | 6^{4} | 6 | 6
(Romania) V Hănescu (Luxembourg) G Müller | 7^{7} | 4 | 1
WC | (France) M Gicquel (France) É Roger-Vasselin | 3 | 6 | 6
(Germany) D Brands (Germany) F Moser | 6 | 3 | 3
(France) J Chardy (Poland) Ł Kubot | 2 | 7^{7} | 6^{6}
(Bulgaria) G Dimitrov (Denmark) F Nielsen | 6 | 6^{5} | 7^{8}
(United States) J Cerretani (Slovakia) L Lacko | 2 | 6 | 1
7 | (Austria) A Peya (Brazil) B Soares | 6 | 3 | 6

Second round
3 | (Sweden) R Lindstedt (Canada) D Nestor | 6^{4} | 3
WC | (France) J Dasnières de Veigy (France) F Serra | 7^{7} | 6
(Germany) A Begemann (Germany) M Emmrich | 0 | 2
16 | (Poland) M Fyrstenberg (Poland) M Matkowski | 6 | 6
12 | (Croatia) I Dodig (Brazil) M Melo | 6 | 4 | 6
WC | (France) M Gicquel (France) É Roger-Vasselin | 4 | 6 | 3
(Bulgaria) G Dimitrov (Denmark) F Nielsen | 3 | 5
7 | (Austria) A Peya (Brazil) B Soares | 6 | 7

Third round
WC | (France) J Dasnières de Veigy (France) F Serra | 4 | 3
16 | (Poland) M Fyrstenberg (Poland) M Matkowski | 6 | 6
12 | (Croatia) I Dodig (Brazil) M Melo | 4 | 4
7 | (Austria) A Peya (Brazil) B Soares | 6 | 6

Quarterfinals
16 | (Poland) M Fyrstenberg (Poland) M Matkowski | 6 | 4 | 1^{r}
7 | (Austria) A Peya (Brazil) B Soares | 1 | 6 | 3

=== Bottom half ===
==== Section 3 ====
First round
6 | (Pakistan) A-u-H Qureshi (Netherlands) J-J Rojer | 6 | 7^{7}
(Russia) E Donskoy (Russia) D Tursunov | 3 | 6^{1}
(Slovenia) A Bedene (Slovenia) G Žemlja | 4 | 6 | 6
(Czech Republic) L Dlouhý (United States) R Ram | 6 | 4 | 4
(Argentina) C Berlocq (Argentina) L Mayer | 6 | 3 | 1
(Uruguay) P Cuevas (Argentina) H Zeballos | 2 | 6 | 6
WC | (France) P-H Herbert (France) N Renavand | 3 | 3
9 | (Austria) J Melzer (India) L Paes | 6 | 6
14 | (Italy) D Bracciali (Italy) F Fognini | 6^{3} | 4
(Israel) J Erlich (Israel) A Ram | 7^{7} | 6
(Spain) R Bautista-Agut (Spain) D Gimeno-Traver | 6 | 6
WC | (France) A Olivetti (France) M Teixeira | 4 | 2
Alt | (Thailand) Sa Ratiwatana (Thailand) So Ratiwatana | 4 | 1
(Italy) P Lorenzi (Italy) P Starace | 6 | 6
(Poland) T Bednarek (Poland) J Janowicz | 7 | 6
4 | (India) M Bhupathi (India) R Bopanna | 5 | 4

Second round
6 | (Pakistan) A-u-H Qureshi (Netherlands) J-J Rojer | 7 | 6
(Slovenia) A Bedene (Slovenia) G Žemlja | 5 | 1
(Uruguay) P Cuevas (Argentina) H Zeballos | 5 | 6 | 7^{8}
9 | (Austria) J Melzer (India) L Paes | 7 | 4 | 6^{6}
(Israel) J Erlich (Israel) A Ram | 5 | 6 | 3
(Spain) R Bautista-Agut (Spain) D Gimeno-Traver | 7 | 3 | 6
(Italy) P Lorenzi (Italy) P Starace | 7^{7} | 3 | 6^{4}
(Poland) T Bednarek (Poland) J Janowicz | 6^{3} | 6 | 7^{7}

Third round
6 | (Pakistan) A-u-H Qureshi (Netherlands) J-J Rojer | 7 | 3 | 6^{5}
(Uruguay) P Cuevas (Argentina) H Zeballos | 5 | 6 | 7^{7}
(Spain) R Bautista-Agut (Spain) D Gimeno-Traver | 4 | 4
(Poland) T Bednarek (Poland) J Janowicz | 6 | 6

Quarterfinals
(Uruguay) P Cuevas (Argentina) H Zeballos | 7^{7} | 4 | 6
(Poland) T Bednarek (Poland) J Janowicz | 6^{3} | 6 | 1

==== Section 4 ====
First round
5 | (Belarus) M Mirnyi (Romania) H Tecău | 6 | 7^{7}
(France) A Mannarino (France) B Paire | 0 | 6^{3}
(France) M Llodra (France) N Mahut | 6 | 6
(Poland) M Kowalczyk (Czech Republic) L Rosol | 3 | 3
(Philippines) TC Huey (United Kingdom) D Inglot | 7^{7} | 6
(Germany) T Kamke (Germany) F Mayer | 6^{5} | 4
(Russia) M Elgin (Uzbekistan) D Istomin | 1 | 6 | 6
11 | (Mexico) S González (United States) S Lipsky | 6 | 3 | 4
15 | (Austria) J Knowle (Slovakia) F Polášek | 6^{5} | 6^{5}
(United Kingdom) J Murray (Australia) J Peers | 7^{7} | 7^{7}
(Colombia) JS Cabal (Colombia) R Farah | 6 | 4 | 6
(Belgium) X Malisse (United Kingdom) K Skupski | 4 | 6 | 3
WC | (France) P-H Mathieu (France) L Pouille | 2 | 0
(Italy) A Seppi (Serbia) V Troicki | 6 | 6
(Czech Republic) J Levinský (Chinese Taipei) Y-h Lu | 2^{r}
2 | (Spain) M Granollers (Spain) M López | 4

Second round
5 | (Belarus) M Mirnyi (Romania) H Tecău | 6 | 6^{3} | 5
(France) M Llodra (France) N Mahut | 4 | 7^{7} | 7
(Philippines) TC Huey (United Kingdom) D Inglot | 6 | 7^{7}
(Russia) M Elgin (Uzbekistan) D Istomin | 3 | 6^{5}
(United Kingdom) J Murray (Australia) J Peers | 6 | 4 | 4
(Colombia) JS Cabal (Colombia) R Farah | 3 | 6 | 6
(Italy) A Seppi (Serbia) V Troicki | 3 | 2
2 | (Spain) M Granollers (Spain) M López | 6 | 6

Third round
(France) M Llodra (France) N Mahut | 6 | 6
(Philippines) TC Huey (United Kingdom) D Inglot | 3 | 4
(Colombia) JS Cabal (Colombia) R Farah | 3 | 4
2 | (Spain) M Granollers (Spain) M López | 6 | 6

Quarterfinals
(France) M Llodra (France) N Mahut | 6 | 1 | 6
2 | (Spain) M Granollers (Spain) M López | 3 | 6 | 3
