= 2013 Reinert Open – Singles =

Singles
- 2013 Reinert Open

Final
- Champion: (Germany) Dinah Pfizenmaier
- Runner-up: (Ukraine) Maryna Zanevska
- Score: 6–4, 4–6, 6–4

Events
Singles	Doubles
← 2012 ·	Reinert Open	· 2014 →

Annika Beck was the defending champion in the 2013 Reinert Open, having won the event in 2012, but she chose not to defend her title in Versmold.

Dinah Pfizenmaier won the title, defeating Maryna Zanevska in the final, 6–4, 4–6, 6–4.

== Seeds ==
1. (Georgia (country)) Anna Tatishvili (second round)
2. (Germany) Dinah Pfizenmaier (champion)
3. (Austria) Yvonne Meusburger (semifinals)
4. (Ukraine) Maryna Zanevska (final)
5. (France) Claire Feuerstein (semifinals)
6. (Croatia) Ana Vrljić (second round)
7. (Germany) Carina Witthöft (quarterfinals)
8. (Liechtenstein) Stephanie Vogt (quarterfinals)

== Main draw ==
=== Key ===
- Q = Qualifier
- WC = Wild card
- LL = Lucky loser
- Alt = Alternate
- SE = Special exempt
- PR = Protected ranking
- ITF = ITF entry
- JE = Junior exempt
- w/o = Walkover
- r = Retired
- d = Defaulted
- SR = Special ranking

=== Finals ===
Semifinals
5	(France) Claire Feuerstein	6^{3}	2
4	(Ukraine) Maryna Zanevska	7^{7}	6
3	(Austria) Yvonne Meusburger	6	6^{5}	0
2	(Germany) Dinah Pfizenmaier	2	7^{7}	6

Final
4	(Ukraine) Maryna Zanevska	4	6	4
2	(Germany) Dinah Pfizenmaier	6	4	6

=== Top half ===
First round
1/WC	(Georgia (country)) A Tatishvili	6	6
(Denmark) K Barbat	2	1
(United States) C Scholl	4	3
(Czech Republic) R Voráčová	6	6
(Switzerland) V Golubic	6	6
Q	(Germany) F König	1	3
(Japan) K Onishi	2	0
5	(France) C Feuerstein	6	6
4	(Ukraine) M Zanevska	6	6
(Switzerland) IM Kocher	4	3
Q	(Germany) T Korpatsch	6	6
(Italy) A Remondina	0	4
WC	(Germany) J Wachaczyk	6	1	6
(Germany) V Schmid	3	6	4
(Germany) L Schäder	4	4
7	(Germany) C Witthöft	6	6

Second round
1/WC	(Georgia (country)) A Tatishvili	3	6	3
(Czech Republic) R Voráčová	6	4	6
(Switzerland) V Golubic	1	6^{5}
5	(France) C Feuerstein	6	7^{7}
4	(Ukraine) M Zanevska	6	6
Q	(Germany) T Korpatsch	2	1
WC	(Germany) J Wachaczyk	6^{5}	2
7	(Germany) C Witthöft	7^{7}	6

Quarterfinals
(Czech Republic) R Voráčová	2	6	1
5	(France) C Feuerstein	6	3	6
4	(Ukraine) M Zanevska	6^{8}	6	6
7	(Germany) C Witthöft	7^{10}	4	4

Semifinals
5	(France) C Feuerstein	6^{3}	2
4	(Ukraine) M Zanevska	7^{7}	6

=== Bottom half ===
First round
8	(Liechtenstein) S Vogt	6	6
WC	(Germany) V Heisen	1	2
Q	(Germany) Y Morderger	4	4
(Germany) A Zaja	6	6
(Bosnia and Herzegovina) J Tinjić	6	6
(Russia) A Kushkhova	3	2
Q	(Russia) V Flink	6	2	3
3	(Austria) Y Meusburger	3	6	6
6	(Croatia) A Vrljić	6	6
(Russia) N Dzalamidze	3	1
WC	(Germany) A Lottner	2	7	6
(Georgia (country)) S Shapatava	6	5	2
(Switzerland) L Michel	6	3	3
(Slovenia) A Klepač	4	6	6
(Netherlands) R Hogenkamp	6	3	2
2	(Germany) D Pfizenmaier	4	6	6

Second round
8	(Liechtenstein) S Vogt	6	6
(Germany) A Zaja	3	1
(Bosnia and Herzegovina) J Tinjić	6	2	6^{1}
3	(Austria) Y Meusburger	4	6	7^{7}
6	(Croatia) A Vrljić	4	5
WC	(Germany) A Lottner	6	7
(Slovenia) A Klepač	3	1
2	(Germany) D Pfizenmaier	6	6

Quarterfinals
8	(Liechtenstein) S Vogt	5	1
3	(Austria) Y Meusburger	7	6
WC	(Germany) A Lottner	6^{5}	1
2	(Germany) D Pfizenmaier	7^{7}	6

Semifinals
3	(Austria) Y Meusburger	6	6^{5}	0
2	(Germany) D Pfizenmaier	2	7^{7}	6
