= 2012 Reinert Open =

- Date: July 2–8
- Edition: 5th
- Surface: Clay – Outdoor
- Location: Versmold, Germany

Champions

Singles
- (Germany) Annika Beck

Doubles
- (Argentina) Mailen Auroux / (Argentina) María Irigoyen
← 2011 ·	Reinert Open	· 2013 →

The 2012 Reinert Open was a professional tennis tournament played on outdoor clay courts. It was the 5th edition of the tournament and was part of the 2012 ITF Women's Circuit. It took place in Versmold, Germany between 2 and 8 July 2012.

== WTA entrants ==
=== Seeds ===
Country	Player	Rank^{1}	Seed
AUT	Yvonne Meusburger	126	1
GER	Dinah Pfizenmaier	140	2
NED	Bibiane Schoofs	146	3
BUL	Elitsa Kostova	156	4
FRA	Kristina Mladenovic	157	5
POL	Sandra Zaniewska	160	6
GER	Sarah Gronert	165	7
POL	Marta Domachowska	166	8

- Rankings are as of June 25, 2012.

=== Other entrants ===
The following players received wildcards into the singles main draw:

- (Germany) Anna-Lena Friedsam
- (Germany) Julia Wachaczyk
- (Germany) Carina Witthöft

The following players received entry from the qualifying draw:

- (Russia) Margarita Gasparyan
- (France) Anaïs Laurendon
- (Liechtenstein) Stephanie Vogt
- (Germany) Anna Zaja

The following players received entry from a Lucky loser spot:

- (Argentina) María Irigoyen

== Champions ==
=== Singles ===
- (Germany) Annika Beck def. (Latvia) Anastasija Sevastova, 6–3, 6–1

=== Doubles ===
- (Argentina) Mailen Auroux / (Argentina) María Irigoyen def. (Romania) Elena Bogdan / (Hungary) Réka-Luca Jani, 6–1, 6–4
