= 2014 Reinert Open =

$50,000 ITF Women's Circuit tennis tournament

- Date: 30 June–6 July
- Edition: 7th
- Category: ITF Women's Circuit
- Prize money: $50,000
- Surface: Clay
- Location: Versmold, Germany

Champions

Singles
- (Ukraine) Kateryna Kozlova

Doubles
- (Canada) Gabriela Dabrowski / (Colombia) Mariana Duque
← 2013 ·	Reinert Open	· 2015 →

The 2014 Reinert Open was a professional tennis tournament played on outdoor clay courts. It was the seventh edition of the tournament which was part of the 2014 ITF Women's Circuit, offering a total of $50,000 in prize money. It took place in Versmold, Germany, on 30 June–6 July 2014.

== Singles main draw entrants ==
=== Seeds ===
Country	Player	Rank^{1}	Seed
ITA	Karin Knapp	47	1
POL	Urszula Radwanska	103	2
GER	Anna-Lena Friedsam	110	3
GER	Dinah Pfizenmaier	116	4
CHN	Zheng Saisai	125	5
CZE	Kateřina Siniaková	133	6
NED	Arantxa Rus	142	7
UKR	Anastasiya Vasylyeva	145	8

- ^{1} Rankings as of 23 June 2014

=== Other entrants ===
The following players received wildcards into the singles main draw:

- (Italy) Karin Knapp
- (Germany) Antonia Lottner
- (Poland) Urszula Radwanska
- (Germany) Julia Wachaczyk

The following players received entry from the qualifying draw:

- (Paraguay) Verónica Cepede Royg
- (Slovakia) Lenka Juríková
- (Ukraine) Oleksandra Korashvili
- (Slovakia) Zuzana Luknárová

== Champions ==
=== Singles ===
- (Ukraine) Kateryna Kozlova def. (Netherlands) Richèl Hogenkamp 6–4, 6–7^{(3–7)}, 6–1

=== Doubles ===
- (Canada) Gabriela Dabrowski / (Colombia) Mariana Duque def. (Paraguay) Verónica Cepede Royg / (Liechtenstein) Stephanie Vogt 6–4, 6–2
