= 2013 Reinert Open =

- Date: 1–7 July
- Edition: 6th
- Draw: 32S / 16D
- Prize money: $50,000
- Surface: Clay
- Location: Versmold, Germany

Champions

Singles
- (Germany) Dinah Pfizenmaier

Doubles
- (Georgia (country)) Sofia Shapatava / (Georgia (country)) Anna Tatishvili
← 2012 ·	Reinert Open	· 2014 →

The 2013 Reinert Open was a professional tennis tournament played on outdoor clay courts. It was the sixth edition of the tournament which was part of the 2013 ITF Women's Circuit, offering a total of $50,000 in prize money. It took place in Versmold, Germany, on 1–7 July 2013.

== WTA entrants ==
=== Seeds ===
Country	Player	Rank^{1}	Seed
GEO	Anna Tatishvili	78	1
GER	Dinah Pfizenmaier	112	2
AUT	Yvonne Meusburger	116	3
UKR	Maryna Zanevska	133	4
FRA	Claire Feuerstein	155	5
CRO	Ana Vrljić	190	6
GER	Carina Witthöft	193	7
LIE	Stephanie Vogt	197	8

- ^{1} Rankings as of 24 June 2013

=== Other entrants ===
The following players received wildcards into the singles main draw:

- (Germany) Vivian Heisen
- (Germany) Antonia Lottner
- (Georgia (country)) Anna Tatishvili
- (Germany) Julia Wachaczyk

The following players received entry from the qualifying draw:

- (Russia) Varvara Flink
- (Germany) Franziska König
- (Germany) Tamara Korpatsch
- (Germany) Yana Morderger

== Champions ==
=== Women's singles ===
- (Germany) Dinah Pfizenmaier def. (Ukraine) Maryna Zanevska 6–4, 4–6, 6–4

=== Women's doubles ===
- (Georgia (country)) Sofia Shapatava / (Georgia (country)) Anna Tatishvili def. (France) Claire Feuerstein / (Czech Republic) Renata Voráčová 6–4, 6–4
