= 2012 Reinert Open – Singles =

Singles
- 2012 Reinert Open

Final
- Champion: (Germany) Annika Beck
- Runner-up: (Latvia) Anastasija Sevastova
- Score: 6–3, 6–1

Events
Singles	Doubles
← 2011 ·	Reinert Open	· 2013 →

Mariana Duque was the defending champion, but decided not to participate.

Annika Beck won the title, defeating Anastasija Sevastova in the final, 6–3, 6–1.

== Seeds ==
1. (Austria) Yvonne Meusburger (first round)
2. (Germany) Dinah Pfizenmaier (semifinals)
3. (Netherlands) Bibiane Schoofs (semifinals)
4. (Bulgaria) Elitsa Kostova (second round)
5. (France) Kristina Mladenovic (quarterfinals)
6. (Poland) Sandra Zaniewska (first round)
7. (Germany) Sarah Gronert (quarterfinals)
8. (Poland) Marta Domachowska (first round)

== Draw ==
=== Key ===
- Q = Qualifier
- WC = Wild card
- LL = Lucky loser
- Alt = Alternate
- SE = Special exempt
- PR = Protected ranking
- ITF = ITF entry
- JE = Junior exempt
- w/o = Walkover
- r = Retired
- d = Defaulted
- SR = Special ranking

=== Finals ===
Semifinals
(Latvia) Anastasija Sevastova	3	7	6
3	(Netherlands) Bibiane Schoofs	6	5	4
(Germany) Annika Beck	4	6	6
2	(Germany) Dinah Pfizenmaier	6	2	3

Final
(Latvia) Anastasija Sevastova	3	1
(Germany) Annika Beck	6	6

=== Top half ===
First round
1	(Austria) Y Meusburger	1	4
(Latvia) A Sevastova	6	6
(Georgia (country)) M Chakhnashvili	6	3	3
LL	(Argentina) M Irigoyen	4	6	6
(Spain) A Parra Santonja	1	6	6
(United States) C Scholl	6	2	3
(Netherlands) R Hogenkamp	0	6	7
6	(Poland) S Zaniewska	6	3	5
3	(Netherlands) B Schoofs	6	6
Q	(France) A Laurendon	4	0
(Spain) L Costas	6	0	7^{7}
Q	(Liechtenstein) S Vogt	0	6	6^{2}
WC	(Germany) C Witthöft	6	2	6
(Portugal) MJ Koehler	4	6	2
(Croatia) T Mrdeža	3	6	2
5	(France) K Mladenovic	6	2	6

Second round
(Latvia) A Sevastova	6	6
LL	(Argentina) M Irigoyen	1	3
(Spain) A Parra Santonja	3	0^{r}
(Netherlands) R Hogenkamp	6	1
3	(Netherlands) B Schoofs	6	6
(Spain) L Costas	4	3
WC	(Germany) C Witthöft
5	(France) K Mladenovic	w/o

Quarterfinals
(Latvia) A Sevastova	4	6	6
(Netherlands) R Hogenkamp	6	2	3
3	(Netherlands) B Schoofs	6	6
5	(France) K Mladenovic	2	4

Semifinals
(Latvia) A Sevastova	3	7	6
3	(Netherlands) B Schoofs	6	5	4

=== Bottom half ===
First round
8	(Poland) M Domachowska	3	2
(Argentina) F Molinero	6	6
Q	(Germany) A Zaja	7	5	7^{9}
(Romania) E Bogdan	5	7	6^{7}
(Germany) A Beck	7^{7}	6
(Belgium) T Hendler	6^{2}	2
WC	(Germany) J Wachaczyk	4	3
4	(Bulgaria) E Kostova	6	6
7	(Germany) S Gronert	7	6
(Spain) I Ferrer Suárez	5	4
(Germany) K Barrois	7^{8}	7^{7}
Q	(Russia) M Gasparyan	6^{6}	6^{2}
(Ukraine) O Savchuk	6	6
(Hungary) R-L Jani	2	0
WC	(Germany) A-L Friedsam	6	6^{5}	0
2	(Germany) D Pfizenmaier	4	7^{7}	6

Second round
(Argentina) F Molinero	3	2
Q	(Germany) A Zaja	6	6
(Germany) A Beck	6	6
4	(Bulgaria) E Kostova	4	1
7	(Germany) S Gronert	6	6
(Germany) K Barrois	3	2
(Ukraine) O Savchuk	3	7^{7}	2
2	(Germany) D Pfizenmaier	6	6^{5}	6

Quarterfinals
Q	(Germany) A Zaja	6^{6}	2
(Germany) A Beck	7^{8}	6
7	(Germany) S Gronert	3	7	4
2	(Germany) D Pfizenmaier	6	5	6

Semifinals
(Germany) A Beck	4	6	6
2	(Germany) D Pfizenmaier	6	2	3
