= 2015 Reinert Open =

- Date: 6–12 July
- Edition: 8th
- Category: ITF Women's Circuit
- Prize money: $50,000
- Surface: Clay
- Location: Versmold, Germany

Champions

Singles
- (Germany) Carina Witthöft

Doubles
- (Czech Republic) Eva Hrdinová / (Israel) Shahar Pe'er
← 2014 ·	Reinert Open	· 2016 →

The 2015 Reinert Open was a professional tennis tournament played on outdoor clay courts. It was the eighth edition of the tournament and part of the 2015 ITF Women's Circuit, offering a total of $50,000 in prize money. It took place in Versmold, Germany, on 6–12 June 2015.

== Singles main draw entrants ==
=== Seeds ===
Country	Player	Rank^{1}	Seed
GER	Carina Witthöft	53	1
SWE	Johanna Larsson	73	2
GER	Anna-Lena Friedsam	87	3
ISR	Shahar Pe'er	120	4
NED	Richèl Hogenkamp	123	5
GER	Laura Siegemund	128	6
UKR	Maryna Zanevska	138	7
LIE	Stephanie Vogt	151	8

- ^{1} Rankings as of 29 June 2015

=== Other entrants ===
The following players received wildcards into the singles main draw:

- (Germany) Katharina Gerlach
- (Germany) Katharina Hobgarski
- (Sweden) Johanna Larsson
- (Germany) Carina Witthöft

The following players received entry from the qualifying draw:

- (Greece) Valentini Grammatikopoulou
- (Czech Republic) Gabriela Pantůčková
- (Germany) Tamara Korpatsch
- (Czech Republic) Petra Rohanová

The following player received entry as a lucky loser:

- (Czech Republic) Tereza Malíková

The following player received entry by a junior exempt:

- (Belarus) Iryna Shymanovich

== Champions ==
=== Singles ===
- (Germany) Carina Witthöft def. (Sweden) Johanna Larsson 6–3, 6–3

=== Doubles ===
- (Czech Republic) Eva Hrdinová / (Israel) Shahar Pe'er def. (Ukraine) Alona Fomina / (Ukraine) Sofiya Kovalets 6–1, 6–3
