= 2013 Reinert Open – Doubles =

Doubles
- 2013 Reinert Open

Final
- Champions: (Georgia (country)) Sofia Shapatava (Georgia (country)) Anna Tatishvili
- Runners-up: (France) Claire Feuerstein (Czech Republic) Renata Voráčová
- Score: 6–4, 6–4

Events
Singles	Doubles
← 2012 ·	Reinert Open	· 2014 →

Mailen Auroux and María Irigoyen were the defending champions, having won the event in 2012, but both players chose not to defend their title; instead, opting to play at the $25,000 tournament in São José do Rio Preto, Brazil.

Sofia Shapatava and Anna Tatishvili won the tournament, defeating Claire Feuerstein and Renata Voráčová in the final, 6–4, 6–4.

== Seeds ==
1. (Austria) Sandra Klemenschits / (Slovenia) Andreja Klepač (semifinals)
2. (Georgia (country)) Sofia Shapatava / (Georgia (country)) Anna Tatishvili (champions)
3. (Netherlands) Richèl Hogenkamp / (Liechtenstein) Stephanie Vogt (first round)
4. (Croatia) Ana Vrljić / (Ukraine) Maryna Zanevska (semifinals)

== Draw ==
=== Key ===
- Q = Qualifier
- WC = Wild card
- LL = Lucky loser
- Alt = Alternate
- SE = Special exempt
- PR = Protected ranking
- ITF = ITF entry
- JE = Junior exempt
- w/o = Walkover
- r = Retired
- d = Defaulted
- SR = Special ranking

First round
1	(Austria) S Klemenschits (Slovenia) A Klepač	6	6
(Germany) V Heisen (Japan) K Onishi	1	1
(Australia) M Gianotti (Germany) S Niketta	1	2
(Germany) D Pfizenmaier (Germany) C Witthöft	6	6
3	(Netherlands) R Hogenkamp (Liechtenstein) S Vogt	3	6	[9]
(Germany) V Schmid (Germany) N Zander	6	3	[11]
(Russia) A Kushkhova (Bosnia and Herzegovina) J Tinjić	3	6	[8]
(France) C Feuerstein (Czech Republic) R Voráčová	6	2	[10]
(Germany) F König (Germany) J Wachaczyk	0	3
(Switzerland) V Golubic (Germany) A Lottner	6	6
(Germany) R Sabay (Germany) L Siegemund	4	7	[6]
4	(Croatia) A Vrljić (Ukraine) M Zanevska	6	5	[10]
(Russia) N Dzalamidze (Germany) A Zaja	6	6^{5}	[10]
(Denmark) K Barbat (United States) C Scholl	1	7^{7}	[8]
(Germany) T Korpatsch (Germany) T Stoll	1	1
2	(Georgia (country)) S Shapatava (Georgia (country)) A Tatishvili	6	6

Quarterfinals
1	(Austria) S Klemenschits (Slovenia) A Klepač	6	6
(Germany) D Pfizenmaier (Germany) C Witthöft	4	2
(Germany) V Schmid (Germany) N Zander	5	4
(France) C Feuerstein (Czech Republic) R Voráčová	7	6
(Switzerland) V Golubic (Germany) A Lottner
4	(Croatia) A Vrljić (Ukraine) M Zanevska	w/o
(Russia) N Dzalamidze (Germany) A Zaja	2	2
2	(Georgia (country)) S Shapatava (Georgia (country)) A Tatishvili	6	6

Semifinals
1	(Austria) S Klemenschits (Slovenia) A Klepač	4	3
(France) C Feuerstein (Czech Republic) R Voráčová	6	6
4	(Croatia) A Vrljić (Ukraine) M Zanevska	7	1	[3]
2	(Georgia (country)) S Shapatava (Georgia (country)) A Tatishvili	5	6	[10]

Final
(France) C Feuerstein (Czech Republic) R Voráčová	4	4
2	(Georgia (country)) S Shapatava (Georgia (country)) A Tatishvili	6	6
