= 2014 Reinert Open – Singles =

Singles
- 2014 Reinert Open

Final
- Champion: (Ukraine) Kateryna Kozlova
- Runner-up: (Netherlands) Richèl Hogenkamp
- Score: 6–4, 6–7^{(3–7)}, 6–1

Events
Singles	Doubles
← 2013 ·	Reinert Open	· 2015 →

Dinah Pfizenmaier was the defending champion, but lost in the semifinals to Kateryna Kozlova.

Kozlova went on to win the tournament, defeating Richèl Hogenkamp in the final, 6–4, 6–7^{(3–7)}, 6–1.

== Seeds ==
1. (Italy) Karin Knapp (first round)
2. (Poland) Urszula Radwańska (second round)
3. (Germany) Anna-Lena Friedsam (quarterfinals)
4. (Germany) Dinah Pfizenmaier (semifinals)
5. (China) Zheng Saisai (first round)
6. (Czech Republic) Kateřina Siniaková (quarterfinals)
7. (Netherlands) Arantxa Rus (second round)
8. (Ukraine) Anastasiya Vasylyeva (second round)

== Main draw ==
=== Key ===
- Q = Qualifier
- WC = Wild card
- LL = Lucky loser
- Alt = Alternate
- SE = Special exempt
- PR = Protected ranking
- ITF = ITF entry
- JE = Junior exempt
- w/o = Walkover
- r = Retired
- d = Defaulted
- SR = Special ranking

=== Finals ===
Semifinals
(Netherlands) Richèl Hogenkamp	6	6
(Germany) Carina Witthöft	3	0
4	(Germany) Dinah Pfizenmaier	3	4
(Ukraine) Kateryna Kozlova	6	6

Final
(Netherlands) Richèl Hogenkamp	4	7^{7}	1
(Ukraine) Kateryna Kozlova	6	6^{3}	6

=== Top half ===
First round
1/WC	(Italy) K Knapp	3	6^{5}
Q	(Paraguay) V Cepede Royg	6	7^{7}
(Netherlands) R Hogenkamp	6	6
(Hong Kong) L Zhang	3	1
(Colombia) M Duque	6	5	7
(Germany) L Siegemund	1	7	5
(Liechtenstein) S Vogt	3	0
6	(Czech Republic) K Siniaková	6	6
3	(Germany) A-L Friedsam	6	6
(Chile) D Seguel	0	3
(Turkey) Ç Büyükakçay	6	6
Q	(Ukraine) O Korashvili	1	2
(Germany) N Zander	2	6	2
(Canada) G Dabrowski	6	3	6
(Germany) C Witthöft	4	7^{7}	6
5	(China) S Zheng	6	6^{3}	2

Second round
Q	(Paraguay) V Cepede Royg	6	3	1
(Netherlands) R Hogenkamp	2	6	6
(Colombia) M Duque	2	4
6	(Czech Republic) K Siniaková	6	6
3	(Germany) A-L Friedsam	6	1	6
(Turkey) Ç Büyükakçay	0	6	3
(Canada) G Dabrowski	2	5
(Germany) C Witthöft	6	7

Quarterfinals
(Netherlands) R Hogenkamp	2	6	6
6	(Czech Republic) K Siniaková	6	4	3
3	(Germany) A-L Friedsam	6	1	4
(Germany) C Witthöft	4	6	6

Semifinals
(Netherlands) R Hogenkamp	6	6
(Germany) C Witthöft	3	0

=== Bottom half ===
First round
7	(Netherlands) A Rus	6	6
Q	(Slovakia) Z Luknárová	2	2
(Russia) E Alexandrova	6	6
WC	(Germany) J Wachaczyk	1	1
Q	(Slovakia) L Juríková	4	7^{8}	4
(France) A Hesse	6	6^{6}	6
(Italy) A Brianti	0	4
4	(Germany) D Pfizenmaier	6	6
8	(Ukraine) A Vasylyeva	6	6
(Czech Republic) E Birnerová	2	4
WC	(Germany) A Lottner	3	3
(Georgia (country)) S Shapatava	6	6
(Switzerland) V Golubic	3	6	5
(Ukraine) K Kozlova	6	3	7
(Russia) E Bychkova	6	3	2
2/WC	(Poland) U Radwańska	3	6	6

Second round
7	(Netherlands) A Rus	6	4	1
(Russia) E Alexandrova	1	6	6
(France) A Hesse	4	3
4	(Germany) D Pfizenmaier	6	6
8	(Ukraine) A Vasylyeva	6^{4}	3
(Georgia (country)) S Shapatava	7^{7}	6
(Ukraine) K Kozlova	7	6
2/WC	(Poland) U Radwańska	5	2

Quarterfinals
(Russia) E Alexandrova	4	5
4	(Germany) D Pfizenmaier	6	7
(Georgia (country)) S Shapatava	2	1
(Ukraine) K Kozlova	6	6

Semifinals
4	(Germany) D Pfizenmaier	3	4
(Ukraine) K Kozlova	6	6
