= 2012 Reinert Open – Doubles =

Doubles
- 2012 Reinert Open

Final
- Champions: (Argentina) Mailen Auroux (Argentina) María Irigoyen
- Runners-up: (Romania) Elena Bogdan (Hungary) Réka-Luca Jani
- Score: 6–1, 6–4

Events
Singles	Doubles
← 2011 ·	Reinert Open	· 2013 →

Elizaveta Ianchuk and Julia Mayr were the defending champions, but both decided not to participate.

Mailen Auroux and María Irigoyen won the title, defeating Elena Bogdan and Réka-Luca Jani in the final, 6–1, 6–4.

== Seeds ==
1. (Argentina) Mailen Auroux / (Argentina) María Irigoyen (champions)
2. (Romania) Elena Bogdan / (Hungary) Réka-Luca Jani (final)
3. (Germany) Kristina Barrois / (Austria) Yvonne Meusburger (semifinals)
4. (Czech Republic) Hana Birnerová / (Bulgaria) Elitsa Kostova (first round)

== Draw ==
=== Key ===
- Q = Qualifier
- WC = Wild card
- LL = Lucky loser
- Alt = Alternate
- SE = Special exempt
- PR = Protected ranking
- ITF = ITF entry
- JE = Junior exempt
- w/o = Walkover
- r = Retired
- d = Defaulted
- SR = Special ranking

First round
1	(Argentina) M Auroux (Argentina) M Irigoyen	6	6
(Germany) J Peters (Germany) S Weidemann	1	0
(Germany) V Heisen (France) A Laurendon	6^{1}	7^{7}	[7]
(Belgium) T Hendler (United States) C Scholl	7^{7}	6^{4}	[10]
3	(Germany) K Barrois (Austria) Y Meusburger	6	6
(Russia) A Artamonova (Russia) A Pivovarova	4	2
(Denmark) K Barbat (Germany) A-L Friedsam	6	6
(Argentina) F Molinero (Croatia) T Mrdeža	3	1
(Denmark) M Ejdesgaard (Chinese Taipei) W-h Hsu	6	6
(Germany) C Litfin (Germany) S Niketta	1	4
(Russia) M Gasparyan (Russia) V Kudermetova	7	6
4	(Czech Republic) H Birnerová (Bulgaria) E Kostova	5	2
(Romania) Á Szatmári (Poland) S Zaniewska	6	6
(Germany) D Pfizenmaier (Germany) J Wachaczyk	1	3
(Russia) A Kushkhova (Germany) A Zaja	3	6	[3]
2	(Romania) E Bogdan (Hungary) R-L Jani	6	4	[10]

Quarterfinals
1	(Argentina) M Auroux (Argentina) M Irigoyen	6	6
(Belgium) T Hendler (United States) C Scholl	4	1
3	(Germany) K Barrois (Austria) Y Meusburger	6	6
(Denmark) K Barbat (Germany) A-L Friedsam	2	1
(Denmark) M Ejdesgaard (Chinese Taipei) W-h Hsu	6	6
(Russia) M Gasparyan (Russia) V Kudermetova	4	4
(Romania) Á Szatmári (Poland) S Zaniewska	7^{7}	1	[5]
2	(Romania) E Bogdan (Hungary) R-L Jani	6^{4}	6	[10]

Semifinals
1	(Argentina) M Auroux (Argentina) M Irigoyen	7	7
3	(Germany) K Barrois (Austria) Y Meusburger	5	5
(Denmark) M Ejdesgaard (Chinese Taipei) W-h Hsu	1	4
2	(Romania) E Bogdan (Hungary) R-L Jani	6	6

Finals
1	(Argentina) M Auroux (Argentina) M Irigoyen	6	6
2	(Romania) E Bogdan (Hungary) R-L Jani	1	4
