= 2014 Reinert Open – Doubles =

Doubles
- 2014 Reinert Open

Final
- Champions: (Canada) Gabriela Dabrowski (Colombia) Mariana Duque
- Runners-up: (Paraguay) Verónica Cepede Royg (Liechtenstein) Stephanie Vogt
- Score: 6–4, 6–2

Events
Singles	Doubles
← 2013 ·	Reinert Open	· 2015 →

Sofia Shapatava and Anna Tatishvili were the defending champions, but Tatishvili chose to compete at the Lorraine Open. Shapatava teamed up with Anastasiya Vasylyeva as the third seeds, but lost to Gabriela Dabrowski and Mariana Duque in the semifinals.

Dabrowski and Duque went on to win the tournament, defeating Verónica Cepede Royg and Stephanie Vogt in the final, 6–4, 6–2.

== Seeds ==
1. (Canada) Gabriela Dabrowski / (Colombia) Mariana Duque (champions)
2. (Paraguay) Verónica Cepede Royg / (Liechtenstein) Stephanie Vogt (final)
3. (Georgia (country)) Sofia Shapatava / (Ukraine) Anastasiya Vasylyeva (semifinals)
4. (Czech Republic) Eva Birnerová / (Czech Republic) Kateřina Siniaková (first round)

== Draw ==
=== Key ===
- Q = Qualifier
- WC = Wild card
- LL = Lucky loser
- Alt = Alternate
- SE = Special exempt
- PR = Protected ranking
- ITF = ITF entry
- JE = Junior exempt
- w/o = Walkover
- r = Retired
- d = Defaulted
- SR = Special ranking

First round
1	(Canada) G Dabrowski (Colombia) M Duque	6	7^{7}
(Germany) C Daniels (Germany) D Pfizenmaier	4	6^{2}
(Italy) A Brianti (Italy) K Knapp	6	7
(Turkey) Ç Büyükakçay (Belarus) P Pekhova	4	5
3	(Georgia (country)) S Shapatava (Ukraine) A Vasylyeva	7	6
(Czech Republic) H Birnerová (Russia) E Bychkova	5	2
(Japan) Y Tanaka (Hong Kong) L Zhang	6	3	[10]
(Germany) J Wachaczyk (Germany) N Zander	3	6	[5]
(Switzerland) V Golubic (France) A Hesse	6	3	[5]
(Netherlands) R Hogenkamp (Netherlands) A Rus	3	6	[10]
(Germany) A-L Friedsam (Germany) A Lottner	2	6	[10]
4	(Czech Republic) E Birnerová (Czech Republic) K Siniaková	6	3	[5]
WC	(Germany) K Gerlach (Germany) L Rüffer	7^{7}	4	[11]
(Belgium) M Boev (Germany) A Klasen	6^{3}	6	[9]
(Germany) T Korpatsch (Germany) S Niketta	3	3
2	(Paraguay) V Cepede Royg (Liechtenstein) S Vogt	6	6

Quarterfinals
1	(Canada) G Dabrowski (Colombia) M Duque	6	6
(Italy) A Brianti (Italy) K Knapp	2	1
3	(Georgia (country)) S Shapatava (Ukraine) A Vasylyeva	6	4	[13]
(Japan) Y Tanaka (Hong Kong) L Zhang	4	6	[11]
(Netherlands) R Hogenkamp (Netherlands) A Rus	6	6
(Germany) A-L Friedsam (Germany) A Lottner	1	4
WC	(Germany) K Gerlach (Germany) L Rüffer	3	4
2	(Paraguay) V Cepede Royg (Liechtenstein) S Vogt	6	6

Semifinals
1	(Canada) G Dabrowski (Colombia) M Duque	7^{7}	6
3	(Georgia (country)) S Shapatava (Ukraine) A Vasylyeva	6^{4}	2
(Netherlands) R Hogenkamp (Netherlands) A Rus	4	2
2	(Paraguay) V Cepede Royg (Liechtenstein) S Vogt	6	6

Final
1	(Canada) G Dabrowski (Colombia) M Duque	6	6
2	(Paraguay) V Cepede Royg (Liechtenstein) S Vogt	4	2
