= Gustav Baumhoefer =

Gustav Baumhoefer (17 March 1906 in Hesselteich, in Westphalia – 24 January 1979 in Versmold) was a German entrepreneur.

== Firma Gustav Baumhöfer ==
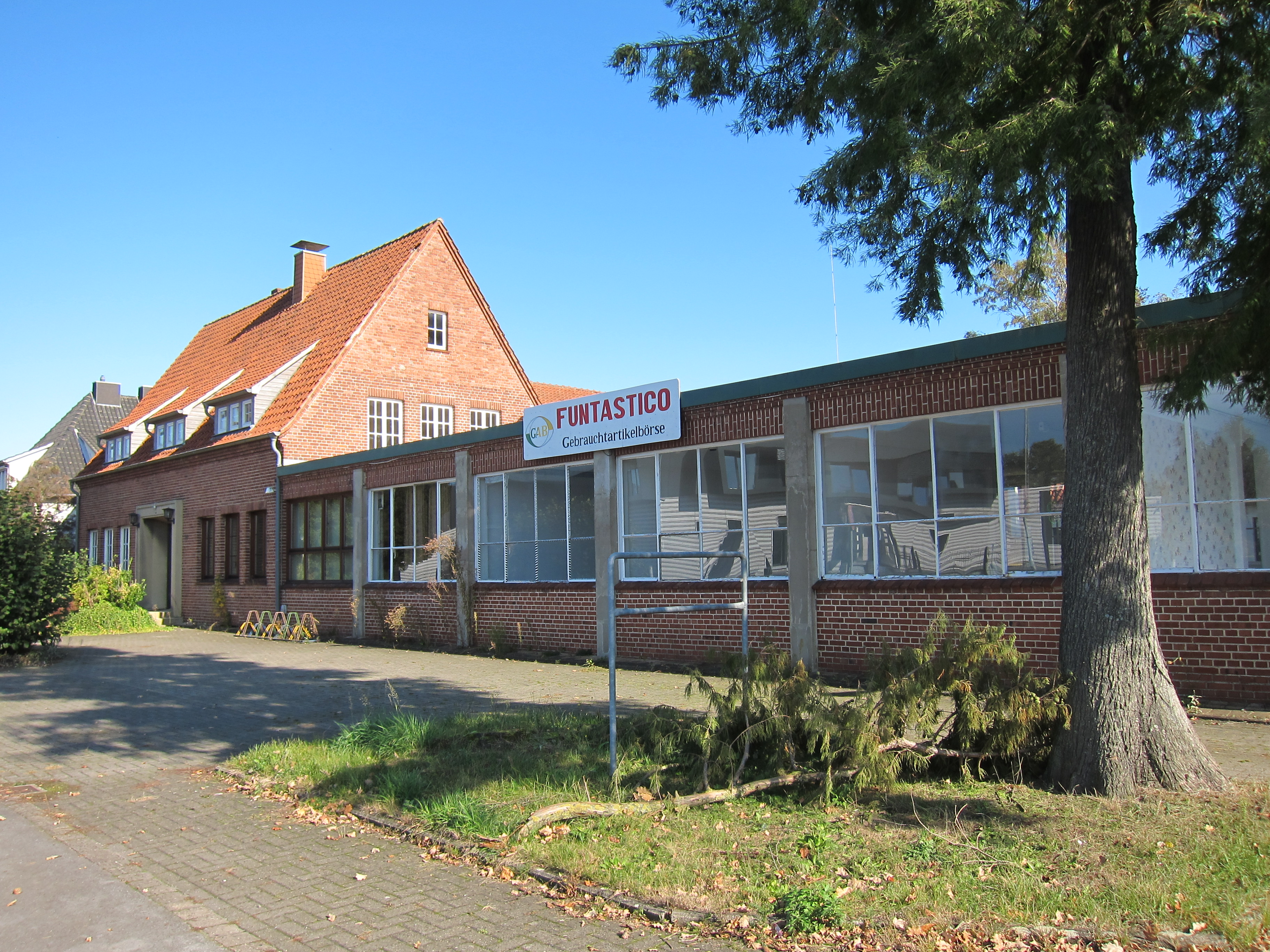
Main building and extension of "Firma Gustav Baumhoefer"

After World War II, on 15 June 1945, Gustav Baumhoefer founded in his home town Versmold a shoe factory that was specialized on men's shoes and boots. First producing on the premisses of the Metall und Leder company a new main building with a factory hall was set up in 1949. The brand name was "Ravensberger Schuhe" and became widely known. In 1957 he expanded briefly by acquiring a second production facility as separate company in Werl-Aspe, Schoetmar, today Bad Salzuflen. In the late 1970s due to changes in the world market and an increasing pressure by import of shoes, the company became unprofitable. A year after his death the factory was shut down, and only a shoe retail shop originally connected with the factory continued to operate until the 1990s.

The factory's main building of 1949 and its later extension of a sewing hall from the mid 1950s are still standing in Versmold. Its architecture is almost the last surviving witness for the city's proud economic blossoming after World War II. Since 1982 the complex served different purposes, as printing factory, as wine depot, and thrift store. In March 2015 it was announced that the main building and factory hall of 'Baumhoefer' will be used as a first respond shelter for arriving asylum applicants. Between August 2015 and March 2016 it served up to 180 refugees at the same time. Currently it is the home for a number of refugee families. The re-purposing caused serious interventions into the historical substance of the building.
