= 2015 Reinert Open – Doubles =

Doubles
- 2015 Reinert Open

Final
- Champions: (Czech Republic) Eva Hrdinová (Israel) Shahar Pe'er
- Runners-up: (Ukraine) Alona Fomina (Ukraine) Sofiya Kovalets
- Score: 6–1, 6–3

Events
| Singles | Doubles |
| ← 2014 · | Reinert Open | · 2016 → |

Gabriela Dabrowski and Mariana Duque were the defending champions, but both players are participating at the 2015 Pan American Games.

Eva Hrdinová and Shahar Pe'er won the tournament, defeating Alona Fomina and Sofiya Kovalets in the final, 6–1, 6–3.

== Seeds ==
1. (Czech Republic) Eva Hrdinová / (Israel) Shahar Pe'er (champions)
2. (Austria) Sandra Klemenschits / (Germany) Antonia Lottner (quarterfinals)
3. (Bulgaria) Elitsa Kostova / (Argentina) Florencia Molinero (first round)
4. (Netherlands) Richèl Hogenkamp / (Netherlands) Lesley Kerkhove (quarterfinals)

== Draw ==
=== Key ===
- Q = Qualifier
- WC = Wild card
- LL = Lucky loser
- Alt = Alternate
- SE = Special exempt
- PR = Protected ranking
- ITF = ITF entry
- JE = Junior exempt
- w/o = Walkover
- r = Retired
- d = Defaulted
- SR = Special ranking

First round
1 | (Czech Republic) E Hrdinová (Israel) S Pe'er | 6 | 6
WC | (Germany) A Bezmenova (Germany) F Kommer | 2 | 0
(Belarus) P Pekhova (Germany) C Witthöft | 5 | 1
(Germany) C Daniels (Germany) N Geuer | 7 | 6
4 | (Netherlands) R Hogenkamp (Netherlands) L Kerkhove | 6 | 6
(Germany) A Klasen (Germany) C Klasen | 3 | 3
(Netherlands) C Burger (Czech Republic) K Vaňková | 4 | 7^{7} | [10]
(Germany) K Gerlach (Germany) L Schäder | 6 | 6^{2} | [3]
(India) S Baluu (Germany) N Siedliska | 4 | 6 | [10]
(United Kingdom) T Moore (Switzerland) C Perrin | 6 | 2 | [7]
(Ukraine) A Fomina (Ukraine) S Kovalets | 6 | 6
3 | (Bulgaria) E Kostova (Argentina) F Molinero | 0 | 1
(Romania) D Negreanu (Australia) K Wlodarczak | 1 | 4
(Czech Republic) L Kunčíková (Czech Republic) K Stuchlá | 6 | 6
(Ukraine) O Ianchuk (Russia) D Kasatkina | 3 | 2
2 | (Austria) S Klemenschits (Germany) A Lottner | 6 | 6

Quarterfinals
1 | (Czech Republic) E Hrdinová (Israel) S Pe'er | 6 | 6
(Germany) C Daniels (Germany) N Geuer | 2 | 4
4 | (Netherlands) R Hogenkamp (Netherlands) L Kerkhove | 5 | 1
(Netherlands) C Burger (Czech Republic) K Vaňková | 7 | 6
(India) S Baluu (Germany) N Siedliska | 4 | 7^{9} | [8]
(Ukraine) A Fomina (Ukraine) S Kovalets | 6 | 6^{7} | [10]
(Czech Republic) L Kunčíková (Czech Republic) K Stuchlá | 4 | 7 | [10]
2 | (Austria) S Klemenschits (Germany) A Lottner | 6 | 5 | [7]

Semifinals
1 | (Czech Republic) E Hrdinová (Israel) S Pe'er | 6 | 7^{10}
(Netherlands) C Burger (Czech Republic) K Vaňková | 3 | 6^{8}
(Ukraine) A Fomina (Ukraine) S Kovalets | 6 | 6
(Czech Republic) L Kunčíková (Czech Republic) K Stuchlá | 2 | 3

Final
1 | (Czech Republic) E Hrdinová (Israel) S Pe'er | 6 | 6
(Ukraine) A Fomina (Ukraine) S Kovalets | 1 | 3
