= 2013 French Open =

- Date: 26 May – 9 June 2013
- Edition: 112
- Category: Grand Slam (ITF)
- Draw: 128S / 64D / 32X
- Surface: Clay
- Location: Paris (XVI^{e}), France
- Venue: Stade Roland Garros
- Attendance: 428,751

Champions

Men's singles
- (Spain) Rafael Nadal

Women's singles
- (United States) Serena Williams

Men's doubles
- (United States) Bob Bryan / (United States) Mike Bryan

Women's doubles
- (Russia) Ekaterina Makarova / (Russia) Elena Vesnina

Mixed doubles
- (Czech Republic) Lucie Hradecká / (Czech Republic) František Čermák

Wheelchair men's singles
- (France) Stéphane Houdet

Wheelchair women's singles
- (Germany) Sabine Ellerbrock

Wheelchair men's doubles
- (France) Stéphane Houdet / (Japan) Shingo Kunieda

Wheelchair women's doubles
- (Netherlands) Jiske Griffioen / (Netherlands) Aniek van Koot

Boys' singles
- (Chile) Cristian Garín

Girls' singles
- (Switzerland) Belinda Bencic

Boys' doubles
- (United Kingdom) Kyle Edmund / (Portugal) Frederico Ferreira Silva

Girls' doubles
- (Czech Republic) Barbora Krejčíková / (Czech Republic) Kateřina Siniaková

Legends under 45 doubles
- (France) Cédric Pioline / (France) Fabrice Santoro

Women's legends doubles
- (United States) Lindsay Davenport / (Switzerland) Martina Hingis

Legends over 45 doubles
- (Ecuador) Andrés Gómez / (Australia) Mark Woodforde
- French Open

The 2013 French Open was a tennis tournament played on outdoor clay courts. It was the 112th edition of the French Open and the second Grand Slam event of the year. It took place at the Stade Roland Garros from 26 May to 9 June. It consisted of events for professional players in singles, doubles and mixed doubles play. Junior and wheelchair players also took part in singles and doubles events.

Rafael Nadal was the three-time defending champion in the men's singles, and won the title to become the first man to win the same Grand Slam title eight times. Maria Sharapova was the defending champion in women's singles, but lost in the final to Serena Williams.

This championship was the third time in grand slam history that two multiple slam sets were accomplished in two different disciplines, and that was Serena Williams in Women's singles, and her fellow countrymen Bob and Mike Bryan in Men's doubles. At the 1969 US Open, Rod Laver won his multiple slam set in Men's singles, and his fellow countryman Ken Rosewall did in Men's doubles. At the 2012 French Open, Mahesh Bhupathi won a multiple slam set in Mixed doubles, and Esther Vergeer won her multiple slam set in Women's Wheelchair Doubles.

In the women's singles final, it marked the first French Open since 1995 that the top two seeded players had played each other in the final, and the first time at any grand slam event since the 2004 Australian Open that the top two seeded players had played each other in a grand slam final.

== Tournament ==
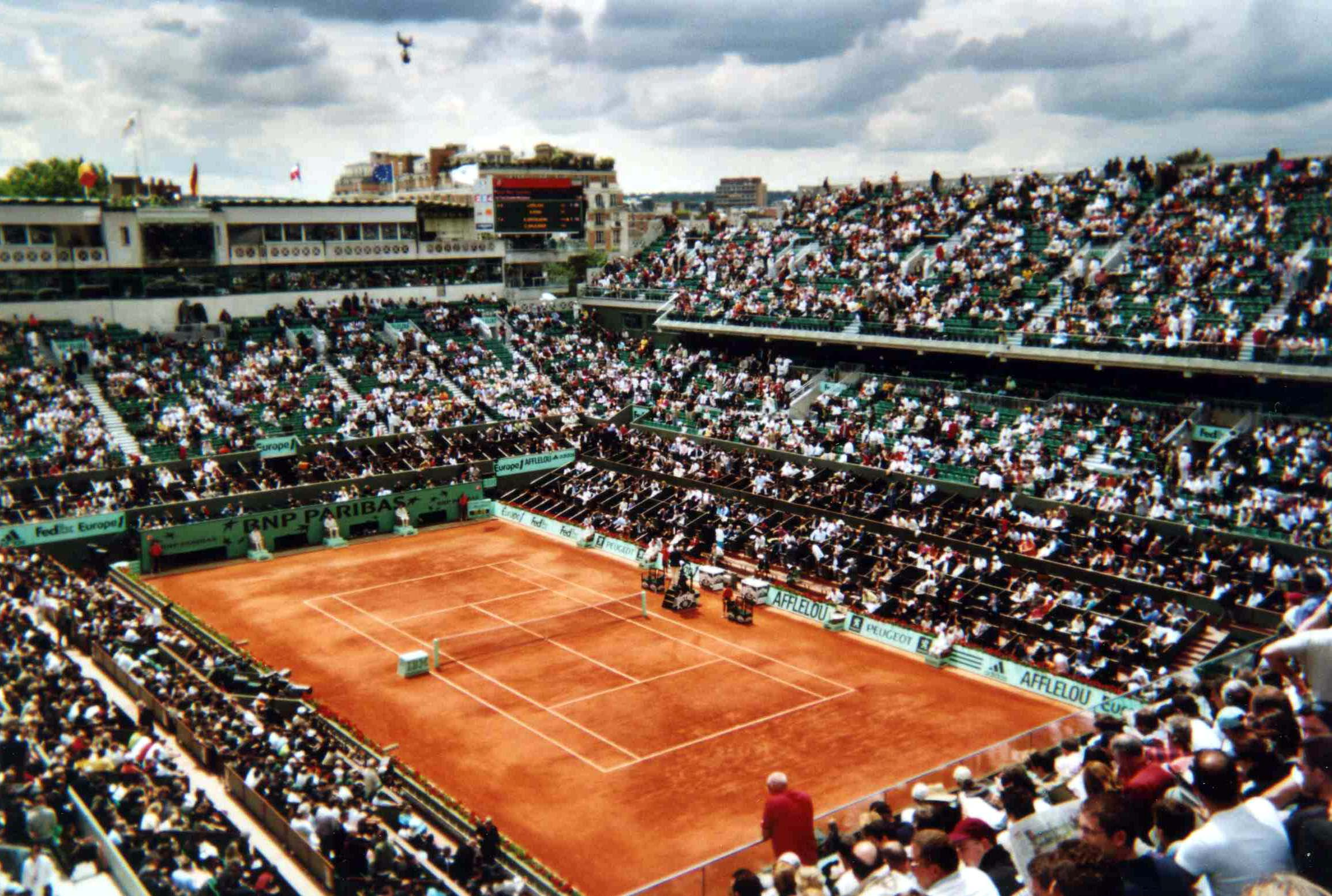
Court Philippe Chatrier where the Finals of the French Open take place.

The 2013 French Open was the 112th edition of the French Open and was held at Stade Roland Garros in Paris.

The tournament was an event run by the International Tennis Federation (ITF) and was part of the 2013 ATP World Tour and the 2013 WTA Tour calendars under the Grand Slam category. The tournament consisted of both men's and women's singles and doubles draws as well as a mixed doubles event.

There were singles and doubles events for both boys and girls (players under 18), which were part of the Grade A category of tournaments, and singles and doubles events for men's and women's wheelchair tennis players as part of the NEC tour under the Grand Slam category. The tournament was played on clay courts and took place over a series of twenty courts, including the three main showcourts, Court Philippe Chatrier, Court Suzanne Lenglen and Court 1.

== Point and prize money distribution ==
=== Point distribution ===
Below is a series of tables for each of the competitions showing the ranking points on offer for each event.

==== Seniors points ====
Event	W	F	SF	QF	Round of 16	Round of 32	Round of 64	Round of 128	Q	Q3	Q2	Q1
Men's singles	2000	1200	720	360	180	90	45	10	25	16	8	0
Men's doubles	2000	1200	720	360	180	90	0	—N/a	—N/a	—N/a	—N/a	—N/a
Women's singles	2000	1400	900	500	280	160	100	5	60	50	40	2
Women's doubles	2000	1400	900	500	280	160	5	—N/a	—N/a	—N/a	—N/a	—N/a

==== Wheelchair points ====
Event	W	F	SF/3rd	QF/4th
Singles^{1}	800	500	375	100
Doubles^{2}	800	500	100	—N/a
Quad doubles	800	100	—N/a	—N/a

- ^{1} is for Men's, Women's and Quad singles
- ^{2} is for Men's and Women's doubles

==== Junior points ====
Event	W	F	SF	QF	Round of 16	Round of 32	Q	Q3
Boys' singles	375	270	180	120	75	30	25	20
Girls' singles	375	270	180	120	75	30	25	20
Boys' doubles	270	180	120	75	45	—N/a	—N/a	—N/a
Girls' doubles	270	180	120	75	45	—N/a	—N/a	—N/a

=== Prize money ===
The French Open's total prize money for 2013 has been increased by more than three million euros to 22 million euros ($28.77 million). The winners of the men's and women's singles titles will each earn 1.5 million euros, up 250,000 euros from last year. The move was part of plans to boost the total prize money by a further 10 million euros to 32 million euros by 2016. In comparison, US Open prize money will reach $33.6 million this year and rise to $50 million by 2017, while Wimbledon prize money was more than 16 million pounds ($24.61 million) in 2012. In the 2013 season, the French Open's prize money is the lowest out of four grand slam tournaments, compared to $30m at the Australian Open, $34m at Wimbledon, and $32m at the US Open.

Event	W	F	SF	QF	Round of 16	Round of 32	Round of 64	Round of 128	Q3	Q2	Q1
Men's singles	€1,500,000	€750,000	€375,000	€190,000	€100,000	€60,000	€35,000	€21,000	€10,000	€5,000	€2,500
Women's singles	€1,500,000	€750,000	€375,000	€190,000	€100,000	€60,000	€35,000	€21,000	€9,000	€4,500	€2,500
Doubles *	€360,000	€180,000	€90,000	€50,000	€28,000	€15,000	€8,000	—N/a	—N/a	—N/a	—N/a
Mixed doubles *	€105,000	€53,000	€26,500	€13,000	€7,000	€3,500	—N/a	—N/a	—N/a	—N/a	—N/a
Wheelchair singles	€18,000	€9,000	€5,000	€3,000	—N/a	—N/a	—N/a	—N/a	—N/a	—N/a	—N/a
Wheelchair doubles *	€6,000	€3,000	€1,800	—N/a	—N/a	—N/a	—N/a	—N/a	—N/a	—N/a	—N/a

_{* per team}

== Singles players ==
Men's singles

Champion		Runner-up	
(Spain) Rafael Nadal [3]		(Spain) David Ferrer [4]	
Semifinals out
(Serbia) Novak Djokovic [1]		(France) Jo-Wilfried Tsonga [6]	
Quarterfinals out
(Germany) Tommy Haas [12]	(Switzerland) Stanislas Wawrinka [9]	(Spain) Tommy Robredo [32]	(Switzerland) Roger Federer [2]
4th round out
(Germany) Philipp Kohlschreiber [16]	(Russia) Mikhail Youzhny [29]	(Japan) Kei Nishikori [13]	(France) Richard Gasquet [7]
(Spain) Nicolás Almagro [11]	(South Africa) Kevin Anderson [23]	(Serbia) Viktor Troicki	(France) Gilles Simon [15]
3rd round out
(Bulgaria) Grigor Dimitrov [26]	(Romania) Victor Hănescu	(United States) John Isner [19]	(Serbia) Janko Tipsarević [8]
(Italy) Fabio Fognini [27]	(France) Benoît Paire [24]	(Poland) Jerzy Janowicz [21]	(Russia) Nikolay Davydenko
(France) Gaël Monfils (WC)	(Italy) Andreas Seppi [20]	(Canada) Milos Raonic [14]	(Spain) Feliciano López
(France) Jérémy Chardy [25]	(Croatia) Marin Čilić [10]	(United States) Sam Querrey [18]	(France) Julien Benneteau [30]
2nd round out
(Argentina) Guido Pella	(France) Lucas Pouille (WC)	(Russia) Dmitry Tursunov	(Chinese Taipei) Lu Yen-hsun
(United States) Jack Sock (Q)	(United States) Ryan Harrison	(Argentina) Federico Delbonis	(Spain) Fernando Verdasco
(Slovakia) Martin Kližan	(Czech Republic) Lukáš Rosol	(Poland) Łukasz Kubot	(Slovenia) Grega Žemlja
(Argentina) Horacio Zeballos	(Netherlands) Robin Haase	(Uzbekistan) Denis Istomin	(Poland) Michał Przysiężny (Q)
(Latvia) Ernests Gulbis	(Netherlands) Igor Sijsling	(Slovenia) Blaž Kavčič	(France) Édouard Roger-Vasselin
(France) Michaël Llodra	(Russia) Evgeny Donskoy	(Portugal) João Sousa	(Spain) Albert Montañés
(Finland) Jarkko Nieminen	(Spain) Roberto Bautista Agut	(Spain) Daniel Gimeno Traver	(Australia) Nick Kyrgios (WC)
(Uruguay) Pablo Cuevas (PR)	(Czech Republic) Jan Hájek	(Germany) Tobias Kamke	(India) Somdev Devvarman (Q)
1st round out
(Belgium) David Goffin	(Croatia) Ivan Dodig	(United States) Alex Kuznetsov (WC)	(Colombia) Alejandro Falla
(Ukraine) Alexandr Dolgopolov [22]	(Australia) Bernard Tomic	(Italy) Simone Bolelli	(Czech Republic) Jiří Veselý (Q)
(France) Guillaume Rufin	(Spain) Guillermo García López	(Russia) Andrey Kuznetsov	(Argentina) Carlos Berlocq
(Spain) Pablo Andújar	(Germany) Julian Reister (Q)	(France) Marc Gicquel (WC)	(France) Nicolas Mahut (WC)
(Germany) Daniel Brands	(United States) Michael Russell	(Spain) Pere Riba (Q)	(Germany) Andreas Beck (Q)
(Cyprus) Marcos Baghdatis	(France) Maxime Teixeira (Q)	(Colombia) Santiago Giraldo	(Canada) Jesse Levine
(Netherlands) Thiemo de Bakker	(Canada) Vasek Pospisil (Q)	(France) Kenny de Schepper	(Spain) Albert Ramos
(Germany) Florian Mayer [28]	(France) Florent Serra (WC)	(United States) Rhyne Williams (LL)	(Ukraine) Serhiy Stakhovsky
(Czech Republic) Tomáš Berdych [5]	(Brazil) Rogério Dutra Silva	(Austria) Jürgen Melzer	(Estonia) Jürgen Zopp (PR)
(Argentina) Leonardo Mayer	(Australia) James Duckworth (Q)	(Argentina) Martín Alund	(Austria) Andreas Haider-Maurer (LL)
(Belgium) Xavier Malisse	(Belgium) Steve Darcis (Q)	(Germany) Jan-Lennard Struff (Q)	(Ukraine) Illya Marchenko (LL)
(Spain) Marcel Granollers [31]	(Japan) Go Soeda	(United States) Steve Johnson (Q)	(Australia) Marinko Matosevic
(Slovenia) Aljaž Bedene	(France) Paul-Henri Mathieu	(Luxembourg) Gilles Müller	(Germany) Benjamin Becker
(Argentina) Juan Mónaco [17]	(United States) James Blake	(Czech Republic) Radek Štěpánek	(Germany) Philipp Petzschner
(Australia) Lleyton Hewitt	(France) Adrian Mannarino (WC)	(United States) Denis Kudla (Q)	(Slovakia) Lukáš Lacko
(Lithuania) Ričardas Berankis	(Italy) Paolo Lorenzi	(Spain) Daniel Muñoz de la Nava (Q)	(Spain) Pablo Carreño Busta (Q)

Women's singles

Champion		Runner-up	
(United States) Serena Williams [1]		(Russia) Maria Sharapova [2]	
Semifinals out
(Italy) Sara Errani [5]		(Belarus) Victoria Azarenka [3]	
Quarterfinals out
(Russia) Svetlana Kuznetsova	(Poland) Agnieszka Radwańska [4]	(Russia) Maria Kirilenko [12]	(Serbia) Jelena Janković [18]
4th round out
(Italy) Roberta Vinci [15]	(Germany) Angelique Kerber [8]	(Serbia) Ana Ivanovic [14]	(Spain) Carla Suárez Navarro [20]
(United States) Bethanie Mattek-Sands	(Italy) Francesca Schiavone	(United States) Jamie Hampton	(United States) Sloane Stephens [17]
3rd round out
(Romania) Sorana Cîrstea [26]	(Czech Republic) Petra Cetkovská	(Serbia) Bojana Jovanovski	(United States) Varvara Lepchenko [29]
(Germany) Dinah Pfizenmaier (Q)	(France) Virginie Razzano (WC)	(Puerto Rico) Monica Puig	(Germany) Sabine Lisicki [32]
(Argentina) Paula Ormaechea (Q)	(Switzerland) Stefanie Vögele	(France) Marion Bartoli [13]	(France) Alizé Cornet [31]
(Czech Republic) Petra Kvitová [7]	(Australia) Samantha Stosur [9]	(New Zealand) Marina Erakovic	(China) Zheng Jie
2nd round out
(France) Caroline Garcia (WC)	(Sweden) Johanna Larsson	(Russia) Anastasia Pavlyuchenkova [19]	(Kazakhstan) Galina Voskoboeva (Q)
(Denmark) Caroline Wozniacki [10]	(Slovakia) Magdaléna Rybáriková	(Ukraine) Elina Svitolina	(Slovakia) Jana Čepelová
(United States) Mallory Burdette	(Poland) Urszula Radwańska	(Slovakia) Zuzana Kučová (Q)	(France) Mathilde Johansson
(United States) Madison Keys	(United States) Shelby Rogers (WC)	(Spain) María Teresa Torró Flor	(Kazakhstan) Yulia Putintseva
(China) Li Na [6]	(Kazakhstan) Yaroslava Shvedova [27]	(Estonia) Kaia Kanepi	(Australia) Ashleigh Barty (WC)
(Colombia) Mariana Duque (Q)	(Belgium) Kirsten Flipkens [21]	(Spain) Sílvia Soler Espinosa	(Germany) Annika Beck
(China) Peng Shuai	(Slovakia) Anna Karolína Schmiedlová (Q)	(Spain) Garbiñe Muguruza	(France) Kristina Mladenovic
(Slovakia) Dominika Cibulková [16]	(United States) Vania King (Q)	(United States) Melanie Oudin	(Canada) Eugenie Bouchard
1st round out
(Georgia (country)) Anna Tatishvili	(Ukraine) Yuliya Beygelzimer (Q)	(Romania) Monica Niculescu	(Netherlands) Kiki Bertens
(Czech Republic) Andrea Hlaváčková	(Russia) Olga Puchkova	(United States) Grace Min (Q)	(France) Stéphanie Foretz Gacon (WC)
(United Kingdom) Laura Robson	(Czech Republic) Barbora Záhlavová-Strýcová	(France) Pauline Parmentier	(Russia) Ekaterina Makarova [22]
(Croatia) Mirjana Lučić-Baroni	(Switzerland) Romina Oprandi	(United States) Christina McHale	(Germany) Mona Barthel
(Israel) Shahar Pe'er	(Croatia) Donna Vekić	(Luxembourg) Mandy Minella	(United States) Venus Williams [30]
(Germany) Julia Görges [24]	(France) Claire Feuerstein (WC)	(South Africa) Chanelle Scheepers	(Croatia) Petra Martić
(Russia) Nadia Petrova [11]	(Japan) Misaki Doi	(France) Irena Pavlovic (WC)	(Romania) Simona Halep
(Sweden) Sofia Arvidsson	(Israel) Julia Glushko	(Japan) Ayumi Morita	(Netherlands) Arantxa Rus
(Spain) Anabel Medina Garrigues	(Spain) Lourdes Domínguez Lino	(Germany) Tatjana Maria	(United States) CoCo Vandeweghe
(Czech Republic) Klára Zakopalová [23]	(United Kingdom) Heather Watson	(Czech Republic) Lucie Hradecká	(Portugal) Nina Bratchikova
(Belarus) Olga Govortsova	(Czech Republic) Kristýna Plíšková	(Hungary) Melinda Czink	(Italy) Flavia Pennetta (PR)
(Portugal) Maria Joao Koehler	(Romania) Irina-Camelia Begu	(Czech Republic) Sandra Záhlavová (Q)	(Russia) Elena Vesnina
(France) Aravane Rezaï (WC)	(Italy) Camila Giorgi	(Belgium) Yanina Wickmayer	(Czech Republic) Lucie Šafářová [25]
(Slovakia) Daniela Hantuchová	(Czech Republic) Karolína Plíšková	(United States) Lauren Davis	(Japan) Kimiko Date-Krumm
(Ukraine) Lesia Tsurenko	(United Kingdom) Elena Baltacha (PR)	(Romania) Alexandra Cadanțu	(Italy) Karin Knapp
(Austria) Tamira Paszek [28]	(Serbia) Vesna Dolonc	(Bulgaria) Tsvetana Pironkova	(Chinese Taipei) Hsieh Su-wei

== Singles seeds ==
The following are the seeded players and notable players who withdrew from the event. Rankings are as of 20 May 2013 and the Points are as of 27 May 2013. It had been reported that the French Open was considering giving Nadal a seeding higher than his current world ranking (No. 4), on the basis of his history at the tournament, but French Open tournament organisers decided against it.

=== Men's singles ===
Seed	Rank	Player	Points	Points defending	Points won	New points	Status
1	1	(Serbia) Novak Djokovic	12,310	1,200	720	11,830	Semifinals lost to (Spain) Rafael Nadal [3]
2	3	(Switzerland) Roger Federer	8,000	720	360	7,640	Quarterfinals lost to (France) Jo-Wilfried Tsonga [6]
3	4	(Spain) Rafael Nadal	6,895	2,000	2,000	6,895	Champion, defeated (Spain) David Ferrer [4]
4	5	(Spain) David Ferrer	6,740	720	1,200	7,220	Runner-up, lost to (Spain) Rafael Nadal [3]
5	6	(Czech Republic) Tomáš Berdych	4,685	180	10	4,515	First round lost to (France) Gaël Monfils (WC)
6	8	(France) Jo-Wilfried Tsonga	3,795	360	720	4,155	Semifinals lost to (Spain) David Ferrer [4]
7	9	(France) Richard Gasquet	3,090	180	180	3,090	Fourth round lost to (Switzerland) Stanislas Wawrinka [9]
8	10	(Serbia) Janko Tipsarević	2,480	180	90	2,390	Third round lost to (Russia) Mikhail Youzhny [29]
9	11	(Switzerland) Stanislas Wawrinka	2,630	180	360	2,810	Quarterfinals lost to (Spain) Rafael Nadal [3]
10	12	(Croatia) Marin Čilić	2,570	90	90	2,570	Third round lost to (Serbia) Viktor Troicki
11	13	(Spain) Nicolás Almagro	2,375	360	180	2,195	Fourth round lost to (Spain) Tommy Robredo [32]
12	14	(Germany) Tommy Haas	2,340	115	360	2,585	Quarterfinals lost to (Serbia) Novak Djokovic [1]
13	15	(Japan) Kei Nishikori	2,315	0	180	2,495	Fourth round lost to (Spain) Rafael Nadal [3]
14	16	(Canada) Milos Raonic	2,225	90	90	2,225	Third round lost to (South Africa) Kevin Anderson [23]
15	17	(France) Gilles Simon	1,895	90	180	1,985	Fourth round lost to (Switzerland) Roger Federer [2]
16	18	(Germany) Philipp Kohlschreiber	1,750	45	180	1,885	Fourth round lost to (Serbia) Novak Djokovic [1]
17	19	(Argentina) Juan Mónaco	1,910	180	10	1,740	First round lost to (Spain) Daniel Gimeno Traver
18	20	(United States) Sam Querrey	1,730	10	90	1,810	Third round lost to (France) Gilles Simon [15]
19	21	(United States) John Isner	1,690	45	90	1,735	Third round lost to (Germany) Tommy Haas [12]
20	22	(Italy) Andreas Seppi	1,530	180	90	1,440	Third round lost to (Spain) Nicolás Almagro [11]
21	23	(Poland) Jerzy Janowicz	1,524	16	90	1,598	Third round lost to (Switzerland) Stanislas Wawrinka [9]
22	24	(Ukraine) Alexandr Dolgopolov	1,500	10	10	1,500	First round lost to (Russia) Dmitry Tursunov
23	25	(South Africa) Kevin Anderson	1,420	90	180	1,510	Fourth round lost to (Spain) David Ferrer [4]
24	26	(France) Benoît Paire	1,405	45	90	1,450	Third round lost to (Japan) Kei Nishikori [13]
25	27	(France) Jérémy Chardy	1,371	45	90	1,416	Third round lost to (France) Jo-Wilfried Tsonga [6]
26	28	(Bulgaria) Grigor Dimitrov	1,355	45	90	1,400	Third round lost to (Serbia) Novak Djokovic [1]
27	29	(Italy) Fabio Fognini	1,345	90	90	1,345	Third round lost to (Spain) Rafael Nadal [3]
28	30	(Germany) Florian Mayer	1,290	45	10	1,255	First round lost to (Uzbekistan) Denis Istomin
29	31	(Russia) Mikhail Youzhny	1,265	90	180	1,355	Fourth round lost to (Germany) Tommy Haas [12]
30	32	(France) Julien Benneteau	1,200	90	90	1,200	Third round lost to (Switzerland) Roger Federer [2]
31	33	(Spain) Marcel Granollers	1,145	180	10	965	First round lost to (Spain) Feliciano López
32	34	(Spain) Tommy Robredo	1,095	(100)^{1}	360	1,355	Quarterfinals lost to (Spain) David Ferrer [4]

^{1}Robredo has 100 points coming off after the French Open because of a challenger tournament (Città di Caltanissetta) he won when not attending the 2012 French Open. Therefore, 100 points must be subtracted from his old points.

==== Withdrawn players ====
Rank	Player	Points	Points defending	Points won	New points	Withdrew due to
2	(United Kingdom) Andy Murray	8,670	360	0	8,310	Back injury
7	(Argentina) Juan Martín del Potro	4,320	360	0	3,960	Virus

=== Women's singles ===
Seed	Rank	Player	Points	Points defending	Points won	New points	Status
1	1	(United States) Serena Williams	11,620	5	2,000	13,615	Champion, defeated (Russia) Maria Sharapova [2]
2	2	(Russia) Maria Sharapova	10,015	2,000	1,400	9,415	Runner-up, lost to (United States) Serena Williams [1]
3	3	(Belarus) Victoria Azarenka	9,005	280	900	9,625	Semifinals lost to (Russia) Maria Sharapova [2]
4	4	(Poland) Agnieszka Radwańska	6,125	160	500	6,465	Quarterfinals lost to (Italy) Sara Errani [5]
5	5	(Italy) Sara Errani	5,835	1,400	900	5,335	Semifinals lost to (United States) Serena Williams [1]
6	6	(China) Li Na	5,335	280	100	5,155	Second round lost to (United States) Bethanie Mattek-Sands
7	7	(Czech Republic) Petra Kvitová	5,175	900	160	4,435	Third round lost to (United States) Jamie Hampton
8	8	(Germany) Angelique Kerber	5,135	500	280	4,915	Fourth round lost to (Russia) Svetlana Kuznetsova
9	9	(Australia) Samantha Stosur	3,645	900	160	2,905	Third round lost to (Serbia) Jelena Janković [18]
10	10	(Denmark) Caroline Wozniacki	3,625	160	100	3,565	Second round lost to (Serbia) Bojana Jovanovski
11	11	(Russia) Nadia Petrova	3,065	160	5	2,910	First round lost to (Puerto Rico) Monica Puig
12	12	(Russia) Maria Kirilenko	3,036	100	500	3,436	Quarterfinals lost to (Belarus) Victoria Azarenka [3]
13	13	(France) Marion Bartoli	2,845	100	160	2,905	Third round lost to (Italy) Francesca Schiavone
14	14	(Serbia) Ana Ivanovic	2,800	160	280	2,920	Fourth round lost to (Poland) Agnieszka Radwańska [4]
15	15	(Italy) Roberta Vinci	2,785	5	280	3,060	Fourth round lost to (United States) Serena Williams [1]
16	16	(Slovakia) Dominika Cibulková	2,540	500	100	2,140	Second round lost to (New Zealand) Marina Erakovic
17	17	(United States) Sloane Stephens	2,530	280	280	2,530	Fourth round lost to (Russia) Maria Sharapova [2]
18	18	(Serbia) Jelena Janković	2,500	100	500	2,900	Quarterfinals lost to (Russia) Maria Sharapova [2]
19	19	(Russia) Anastasia Pavlyuchenkova	2,010	160	100	1,950	Second round lost to (Czech Republic) Petra Cetkovská
20	20	(Spain) Carla Suárez Navarro	1,975	160	280	2,095	Fourth round lost to (Italy) Sara Errani [5]
21	21	(Belgium) Kirsten Flipkens	1,908	30	100	1,978	Second round lost to (Italy) Francesca Schiavone
22	22	(Russia) Ekaterina Makarova	1,811	5	5	1,811	First round lost to (Russia) Svetlana Kuznetsova
23	23	(Czech Republic) Klára Zakopalová	1,745	280	5	1,470	First round lost to (Estonia) Kaia Kanepi
24	24	(Germany) Julia Görges	1,605	160	5	1,450	First round lost to (Slovenia) Zuzana Kučová (Q)
25	25	(Czech Republic) Lucie Šafářová	1,595	100	5	1,500	First round lost to (United States) Jamie Hampton
26	26	(Romania) Sorana Cîrstea	1,595	5	160	1,750	Third round lost to (United States) Serena Williams [1]
27	27	(Kazakhstan) Yaroslava Shvedova	1,572	560	5	1,017	First round lost to (Argentina) Paula Ormaechea (Q)
28	28	(Austria) Tamira Paszek	1,539	5	5	1,539	First round lost to (United States) Melanie Oudin
29	29	(United States) Varvara Lepchenko	1,686	280	160	1,566	Third round lost to (Germany) Angelique Kerber [8]
30	30	(United States) Venus Williams	1,546	100	5	1,451	First round lost to (Poland) Urszula Radwańska
31	31	(France) Alizé Cornet	1,610	5	160	1,765	Third round lost to (Belarus) Victoria Azarenka [3]
32	32	(Germany) Sabine Lisicki	1,526	5	160	1,681	Third round lost to (Italy) Sara Errani [5]

== Main draw wildcard entries ==
=== Men's singles ===
- (France) Marc Gicquel
- (United States) Alex Kuznetsov
- (Australia) Nick Kyrgios
- (France) Nicolas Mahut
- (France) Adrian Mannarino
- (France) Gaël Monfils
- (France) Lucas Pouille
- (France) Florent Serra

=== Women's singles ===
- (Australia) Ashleigh Barty
- (France) Claire Feuerstein
- (France) Stéphanie Foretz-Gacon
- (France) Caroline Garcia
- (France) Irena Pavlovic
- (France) Virginie Razzano
- (France) Aravane Rezaï
- (United States) Shelby Rogers

=== Men's doubles ===
- (France) Jonathan Dasnières de Veigy / (France) Florent Serra
- (France) Jonathan Eysseric / (France) Fabrice Martin
- (France) Marc Gicquel / (France) Édouard Roger-Vasselin
- (France) Pierre-Hugues Herbert / (France) Nicolas Renavand
- (France) Paul-Henri Mathieu / (France) Lucas Pouille
- (France) Gaël Monfils / (France) Josselin Ouanna
- (France) Albano Olivetti / (France) Maxime Teixeira

=== Women's doubles ===
- (France) Séverine Beltrame / (France) Laura Thorpe
- (France) Julie Coin / (France) Pauline Parmentier
- (France) Alizé Cornet / (France) Virginie Razzano
- (France) Stéphanie Foretz Gacon / (France) Irena Pavlovic
- (France) Caroline Garcia / (France) Mathilde Johansson
- (France) Alizé Lim / (France) Aravane Rezaï
- (United States) Serena Williams / (United States) Venus Williams

=== Mixed doubles ===
- (France) Séverine Beltrame / (France) Benoît Paire
- (France) Julie Coin / (France) Nicolas Mahut
- (France) Alizé Cornet / (France) Gilles Simon
- (France) Stéphanie Foretz Gacon / (France) Édouard Roger-Vasselin
- (France) Caroline Garcia / (France) Marc Gicquel
- (France) Alizé Lim / (France) Jérémy Chardy

== Qualifiers ==
=== Men's singles qualifiers ===
1. (Czech Republic) Jiří Veselý
2. (Canada) Vasek Pospisil
3. (Belgium) Steve Darcis
4. (Spain) Pere Riba
5. (United States) Steve Johnson
6. (Germany) Andreas Beck
7. (Germany) Julian Reister
8. (India) Somdev Devvarman
9. (Spain) Pablo Carreño Busta
10. (France) Maxime Teixeira
11. (United States) Denis Kudla
12. (Germany) Jan-Lennard Struff
13. (United States) Jack Sock
14. (Spain) Daniel Muñoz de la Nava
15. (Poland) Michał Przysiężny
16. (Australia) James Duckworth

The following players received entry as lucky losers:

1. (Austria) Andreas Haider-Maurer
2. (Ukraine) Illya Marchenko
3. (United States) Rhyne Williams

=== Women's singles qualifiers ===
1. (Czech Republic) Barbora Záhlavová-Strýcová
2. (Colombia) Mariana Duque Mariño
3. (United States) Vania King
4. (Ukraine) Yuliya Beygelzimer
5. (Argentina) Paula Ormaechea
6. (United States) Grace Min
7. (Slovakia) Anna Karolína Schmiedlová
8. (Germany) Dinah Pfizenmaier
9. (Czech Republic) Sandra Záhlavová
10. (Kazakhstan) Galina Voskoboeva
11. (Israel) Julia Glushko
12. (Slovakia) Zuzana Kučová

== Protected ranking ==
The following players were accepted directly into the main draw using a protected ranking:

Men's singles

- (Uruguay) Pablo Cuevas (PR 54)
- (Estonia) Jürgen Zopp (PR 88)

Women's singles

- (United Kingdom) Elena Baltacha (PR 103)
- (Italy) Flavia Pennetta (PR 14)

== Champions ==
=== Seniors ===
==== Men's singles ====
(Spain) Rafael Nadal defeated (Spain) David Ferrer, 6–3, 6–2, 6–3

- It was Nadal's 12th grand slam title and his 8th at the French Open (a record). It was his 6th career title of the year.

==== Women's singles ====
(United States) Serena Williams defeated (Russia) Maria Sharapova, 6–4, 6–4

- It was Williams' 16th grand slam title and her second at the French Open. It was her 52nd singles title of her career and sixth of 2013.

==== Men's doubles ====
(United States) Bob Bryan / (United States) Mike Bryan defeated (France) Michaël Llodra / (France) Nicolas Mahut, 6–4, 4–6, 7–6^{(7–4)}

- It was the Bryan brothers' 14th grand slam doubles title and their second at the French Open.

==== Women's doubles ====
(Russia) Ekaterina Makarova / (Russia) Elena Vesnina defeated (Italy) Sara Errani / (Italy) Roberta Vinci, 7–5, 6–2

- It was Makarova and Vesnina's 1st grand slam doubles title.

==== Mixed doubles ====
(Czech Republic) Lucie Hradecká / (Czech Republic) František Čermák defeated (France) Kristina Mladenovic / (Canada) Daniel Nestor, 1–6, 6–4, [10–6]

- It was Hradecká 1st grand slam mixed doubles title and her second at the French Open.
- It was Čermák's 1st grand slam mixed doubles title.

=== Juniors ===
==== Boys' singles ====
(Chile) Cristian Garín defeated (Germany) Alexander Zverev, 6–4, 6–1

==== Girls' singles ====
(Switzerland) Belinda Bencic defeated (Germany) Antonia Lottner, 6–1, 6–3

==== Boys' doubles ====
(United Kingdom) Kyle Edmund / (Portugal) Frederico Ferreira Silva defeated (Chile) Cristian Garín / (Chile) Nicolás Jarry, 6–3, 6–3

==== Girls' doubles ====
(Czech Republic) Barbora Krejčíková / (Czech Republic) Kateřina Siniaková defeated (Ecuador) Doménica González / (Brazil) Beatriz Haddad Maia, 7–5, 6–2

=== Wheelchair events ===
==== Wheelchair men's singles ====
(France) Stéphane Houdet defeated (Japan) Shingo Kunieda, 7–5, 5–7, 7–6^{(7–5)}

==== Wheelchair women's singles ====
(Germany) Sabine Ellerbrock defeated (Netherlands) Jiske Griffioen, 6–3, 3–6, 6–1

==== Wheelchair men's doubles ====
(France) Stéphane Houdet / (Japan) Shingo Kunieda defeated (United Kingdom) Gordon Reid / (Netherlands) Ronald Vink, 3–6, 6–4, [10–6]

==== Wheelchair women's doubles ====
(Netherlands) Jiske Griffioen / (Netherlands) Aniek van Koot defeated (Germany) Sabine Ellerbrock / (Netherlands) Sharon Walraven, 6–2, 6–3

=== Other events ===
==== Legends under 45 doubles ====
(France) Cédric Pioline / (France) Fabrice Santoro defeated (Spain) Albert Costa / (Spain) Carlos Moyá, 4–6, 6–4, [4–1] ret.

==== Legends over 45 doubles ====
(Ecuador) Andrés Gómez / (Australia) Mark Woodforde defeated (Iran) Mansour Bahrami / (Australia) Pat Cash, 6–1, 7–6^{(7–2)}

==== Women's legends doubles ====
(United States) Lindsay Davenport / (Switzerland) Martina Hingis defeated (Russia) Elena Dementieva / (United States) Martina Navratilova, 6–4, 6–2

== Withdrawals ==
The following players were accepted directly into the main tournament, but withdrew with injuries or personal reasons.

Men's singles

- (United States) Brian Baker → replaced by (Portugal) João Sousa
- (Brazil) Thomaz Bellucci → replaced by (Ukraine) Illya Marchenko
- (Argentina) Juan Martín del Potro → replaced by (Austria) Andreas Haider-Maurer
- (United States) Mardy Fish → replaced by (Argentina) Guido Pella
- (United Kingdom) Andy Murray → replaced by (United States) Rhyne Williams

Women's singles

- (Spain) Lara Arruabarrena →replaced by (Portugal) Nina Bratchikova
- (Chinese Taipei) Chan Yung-jan → replaced by (Israel) Shahar Pe'er
- (Romania) Alexandra Dulgheru → replaced by (Germany) Tatjana Maria
- (Canada) Aleksandra Wozniak → replaced by (Czech Republic) Kristýna Plíšková

Preceded by 2013 Australian Open	Grand Slam Tournaments	Succeeded by 2013 Wimbledon Championships
