= 2015 Reinert Open – Singles =

Singles
- 2015 Reinert Open

Final
- Champion: (Germany) Carina Witthöft
- Runner-up: (Sweden) Johanna Larsson
- Score: 6–3, 6–3

Events
Singles	Doubles
← 2014 ·	Reinert Open	· 2016 →

Kateryna Kozlova was the defending champion, but was facing a six month doping ban for taking a drug containing the banned substance 1,3-Dimethylbutylamine.

Carina Witthöft won the title, defeating Johanna Larsson in the final, 6–3, 6–3.

== Seeds ==
1. (Germany) Carina Witthöft (champion)
2. (Sweden) Johanna Larsson (final)
3. (Germany) Anna-Lena Friedsam (quarterfinals)
4. (Israel) Shahar Pe'er (first round)
5. (Netherlands) Richèl Hogenkamp (quarterfinals)
6. (Germany) Laura Siegemund (semifinals)
7. (Ukraine) Maryna Zanevska (first round)
8. (Liechtenstein) Stephanie Vogt (semifinals)

== Main draw ==
=== Key ===
- Q = Qualifier
- WC = Wild card
- LL = Lucky loser
- Alt = Alternate
- SE = Special exempt
- PR = Protected ranking
- ITF = ITF entry
- JE = Junior exempt
- w/o = Walkover
- r = Retired
- d = Defaulted
- SR = Special ranking

=== Finals ===
Semifinals
1/WC	(Germany) Carina Witthöft	7	6
6	(Germany) Laura Siegemund	5	4
8	(Liechtenstein) Stephanie Vogt	2	6	5
2/WC	(Sweden) Johanna Larsson	6	1	7

Final
1/WC	(Germany) Carina Witthöft	6	6
2/WC	(Sweden) Johanna Larsson	3	3

=== Top half ===
First round
1/WC	(Germany) C Witthöft	6	6
JE	(Belarus) I Shymanovich	2	3
(Argentina) F Molinero	3	6	3
(Croatia) E Mikulčić	6	1	6
(Netherlands) L Kerkhove	6^{4}	3
(Netherlands) C Burger	7^{7}	6
Q	(Greece) V Grammatikopoulou	6	4	4
5	(Netherlands) R Hogenkamp	4	6	6
3	(Germany) A-L Friedsam	6	6
Q	(Czech Republic) G Pantůčková	3	0
WC	(Germany) K Hobgarski	6	7^{7}
(Netherlands) A Rus	4	6^{5}
(Sweden) R Peterson	6	7^{8}
(Slovenia) D Jakupović	2	6^{6}
(Czech Republic) T Martincová	2	1
6	(Germany) L Siegemund	6	6

Second round
1/WC	(Germany) C Witthöft	6	6
(Croatia) E Mikulčić	2	4
(Netherlands) C Burger	6	6^{5}	4
5	(Netherlands) R Hogenkamp	4	7^{7}	6
3	(Germany) A-L Friedsam	6	6
WC	(Germany) K Hobgarski	1	2
(Sweden) R Peterson	1	0
6	(Germany) L Siegemund	6	6

Quarterfinals
1/WC	(Germany) C Witthöft	6	6
5	(Netherlands) R Hogenkamp	3	4
3	(Germany) A-L Friedsam	4	6^{3}
6	(Germany) L Siegemund	6	7^{7}

Semifinals
1/WC	(Germany) C Witthöft	7	6
6	(Germany) L Siegemund	5	4

=== Bottom half ===
First round
8	(Liechtenstein) S Vogt	6	6
WC	(Germany) K Gerlach	2	2
(Bulgaria) E Kostova	4	2
Q	(Germany) T Korpatsch	6	6
(Russia) D Kasatkina	6	6^{4}	5
(Ukraine) O Ianchuk	2	7^{7}	7
(Germany) A Schäfer	6^{1}	6	6
4	(Israel) S Pe'er	7^{7}	4	0
7	(Ukraine) M Zanevska	3	2
(Switzerland) C Perrin	6	6
Q	(Czech Republic) P Rohanová	0	1
(Czech Republic) K Vaňková	6	6
LL	(Czech Republic) T Malíková	1	4
(Germany) A Lottner	6	6
(Czech Republic) R Voráčová	2	4
2/WC	(Sweden) J Larsson	6	6

Second round
8	(Liechtenstein) S Vogt	6	6
Q	(Germany) T Korpatsch	0	0
(Ukraine) O Ianchuk	5	3
(Germany) A Schäfer	7	6
(Switzerland) C Perrin	6	7
(Czech Republic) K Vaňková	4	5
(Germany) A Lottner	6	4	2
2/WC	(Sweden) J Larsson	3	6	6

Quarterfinals
8	(Liechtenstein) S Vogt	6	3	6
(Germany) A Schäfer	1	6	1
(Switzerland) C Perrin	1	6	4
2/WC	(Sweden) J Larsson	6	2	6

Semifinals
8	(Liechtenstein) S Vogt	2	6	5
2/WC	(Sweden) J Larsson	6	1	7
