= 2013 French Open – Women's singles =

Women's singles
- 2013 French Open

Final
- Champion: (United States) Serena Williams
- Runner-up: (Russia) Maria Sharapova
- Score: 6–4, 6–4

Events
Singles	men	women		boys	girls
Doubles	men	women	mixed	boys	girls
WC Singles	men	women	quad
WC Doubles	men	women	quad
Legends	−45	45+	women
← 2012 ·	French Open	· 2014 →

Serena Williams defeated defending champion Maria Sharapova in the final, 6–4, 6–4 to win the women's singles tennis title at the 2013 French Open. It was her second French Open singles title, 16th major singles title overall, and she completed the double career Grand Slam in singles with the win. Williams was the oldest woman to win the French Open (a record she later surpassed in 2015) and set a record for the longest gap between successive French Open titles (her last being in 2002). With the win, Williams extended her winning streak to 31 matches (dating back to the Miami Open), going undefeated for the 2013 clay court season.

The final marked the first time the top two seeds contested the French Open final since 1995, and the first time overall at a major since the 2004 Australian Open.

This tournament marked the major main-draw debut of future Olympic gold medalist Monica Puig; she lost to Carla Suárez Navarro in the third round. This tournament also marked the first main-draw French Open appearance of future world No. 1 Garbiñe Muguruza, who would win the title three years later.

== Seeds ==
1. (United States) Serena Williams (champion)
2. (Russia) Maria Sharapova (final)
3. (Belarus) Victoria Azarenka (semifinals)
4. (Poland) Agnieszka Radwańska (quarterfinals)
5. (Italy) Sara Errani (semifinals)
6. (China) Li Na (second round)
7. (Czech Republic) Petra Kvitová (third round)
8. (Germany) Angelique Kerber (fourth round)
9. (Australia) Samantha Stosur (third round)
10. (Denmark) Caroline Wozniacki (second round)
11. (Russia) Nadia Petrova (first round)
12. (Russia) Maria Kirilenko (quarterfinals)
13. (France) Marion Bartoli (third round)
14. (Serbia) Ana Ivanovic (fourth round)
15. (Italy) Roberta Vinci (fourth round)
16. (Slovakia) Dominika Cibulková (second round)

17. (United States) Sloane Stephens (fourth round)
18. (Serbia) Jelena Janković (quarterfinals)
19. (Russia) Anastasia Pavlyuchenkova (second round)
20. (Spain) Carla Suárez Navarro (fourth round)
21. (Belgium) Kirsten Flipkens (second round)
22. (Russia) Ekaterina Makarova (first round)
23. (Czech Republic) Klára Zakopalová (first round)
24. (Germany) Julia Görges (first round)
25. (Czech Republic) Lucie Šafářová (first round)
26. (Romania) Sorana Cîrstea (third round)
27. (Kazakhstan) Yaroslava Shvedova (second round)
28. (Austria) Tamira Paszek (first round)
29. (United States) Varvara Lepchenko (third round)
30. (United States) Venus Williams (first round)
31. (France) Alizé Cornet (third round)
32. (Germany) Sabine Lisicki (third round)

Click on the seed number of a player to go to their draw section.

== Draw ==
=== Key ===
- Q = Qualifier
- WC = Wild card
- LL = Lucky loser
- Alt = Alternate
- ITF = ITF entry
- PR = Protected ranking
- SR = Special ranking
- SE = Special exempt
- JE = Junior exempt
- JR = Junior Accelerator Programme entrant
- CO = College Accelerator Programme entrant
- NG = Next Gen Accelerator Program entrant
- w/o = Walkover
- r = Retired
- d = Defaulted

=== Finals ===
Quarterfinals
1	(United States) Serena Williams	6	3	6
(Russia) Svetlana Kuznetsova	1	6	3
4	(Poland) Agnieszka Radwańska	4	6^{6}
5	(Italy) Sara Errani	6	7^{8}
12	(Russia) Maria Kirilenko	6^{3}	2
3	(Belarus) Victoria Azarenka	7^{7}	6
18	(Serbia) Jelena Janković	6	4	3
2	(Russia) Maria Sharapova	0	6	6

Semifinals
1	(United States) Serena Williams	6	6
5	(Italy) Sara Errani	0	1
3	(Belarus) Victoria Azarenka	1	6	4
2	(Russia) Maria Sharapova	6	2	6

Final
1	(United States) Serena Williams	6	6
2	(Russia) Maria Sharapova	4	4

=== Top half ===
==== Section 1 ====
First round
1	(United States) S Williams	6	6
(Georgia (country)) A Tatishvili	0	1
Q	(Ukraine) Y Beygelzimer	3	4
WC	(France) C Garcia	6	6
(Romania) M Niculescu	2	3
(Sweden) J Larsson	6	6
(Netherlands) K Bertens	7	5	2
26	(Romania) S Cîrstea	5	7	6
19	(Russia) A Pavlyuchenkova	4	7^{7}	6
(Czech Republic) A Hlaváčková	6	6^{5}	4
(Czech Republic) P Cetkovská	6	6
(Russia) O Puchkova	0	2
Q	(Kazakhstan) G Voskoboeva	4	6	7
Q	(United States) G Min	6	4	5
WC	(France) S Foretz Gacon	3	0
15	(Italy) R Vinci	6	6

Second round
1	(United States) S Williams	6	6
WC	(France) C Garcia	1	2
(Sweden) J Larsson	1	4
26	(Romania) S Cîrstea	6	6
19	(Russia) A Pavlyuchenkova	5	6	4
(Czech Republic) P Cetkovská	7	2	6
Q	(Kazakhstan) G Voskoboeva	4	6	2
15	(Italy) R Vinci	6	4	6

Third round
1	(United States) S Williams	6	6
26	(Romania) S Cîrstea	0	2
(Czech Republic) P Cetkovská	1	6	2
15	(Italy) R Vinci	6	2	6

Fourth round
1	(United States) S Williams	6	6
15	(Italy) R Vinci	1	3

==== Section 2 ====
First round
10	(Denmark) C Wozniacki	6	6
(United Kingdom) L Robson	3	2
Q	(Czech Republic) B Záhlavová-Strýcová	3	2
(Serbia) B Jovanovski	6	6
(France) P Parmentier	0	1
(Slovakia) M Rybáriková	6	6
(Russia) S Kuznetsova	6	6
22	(Russia) E Makarova	4	2
29	(United States) V Lepchenko	6	6
(Croatia) M Lučić-Baroni	1	2
(Switzerland) R Oprandi	3	6	1
(Ukraine) E Svitolina	6	4	6
(Slovakia) J Čepelová	7^{7}	2	6
(United States) C McHale	6^{3}	6	4
(Germany) M Barthel	6^{6}	2
8	(Germany) A Kerber	7^{8}	6

Second round
10	(Denmark) C Wozniacki	6^{2}	3
(Serbia) B Jovanovski	7^{7}	6
(Slovakia) M Rybáriková	6	2	2
(Russia) S Kuznetsova	1	6	6
29	(United States) V Lepchenko	7^{7}	6
(Ukraine) E Svitolina	6^{5}	1
(Slovakia) J Čepelová	2	2
8	(Germany) A Kerber	6	6

Third round
(Serbia) B Jovanovski	4	6^{2}
(Russia) S Kuznetsova	6	7^{7}
29	(United States) V Lepchenko	4	7^{7}	4
8	(Germany) A Kerber	6	6^{3}	6

Fourth round
(Russia) S Kuznetsova	6	4	6
8	(Germany) A Kerber	4	6	3

==== Section 3 ====
First round
4	(Poland) A Radwańska	6	6
(Israel) S Pe'er	1	1
(United States) M Burdette	6	6
(Croatia) D Vekić	3	4
Q	(Germany) D Pfizenmaier	7	6
(Luxembourg) M Minella	5	1
(Poland) U Radwańska	7^{7}	6^{4}	6
30	(United States) V Williams	6^{5}	7^{7}	4
24	(Germany) J Görges	6^{8}	0
Q	(Slovakia) Z Kučová	7^{10}	6
WC	(France) V Razzano	7^{8}	6
WC	(France) C Feuerstein	6^{6}	4
(South Africa) C Scheepers	5	1
(France) M Johansson	7	6
(Croatia) P Martić	1	6	3
14	(Serbia) A Ivanovic	6	3	6

Second round
4	(Poland) A Radwańska	6	6
(United States) M Burdette	3	2
Q	(Germany) D Pfizenmaier	6	6
(Poland) U Radwańska	3	3
Q	(Slovakia) Z Kučová	6	2	0
WC	(France) V Razzano	4	6	6
(France) M Johansson	2	2
14	(Serbia) A Ivanovic	6	6

Third round
4	(Poland) A Radwańska	6	6
Q	(Germany) D Pfizenmaier	3	4
WC	(France) V Razzano	3	2
14	(Serbia) A Ivanovic	6	6

Fourth round
4	(Poland) A Radwańska	6	6
14	(Serbia) A Ivanovic	2	4

==== Section 4 ====
First round
11	(Russia) N Petrova	6	5	4
(Puerto Rico) M Puig	3	7	6
(United States) M Keys	6	6
(Japan) M Doi	3	2
WC	(France) I Pavlovic	3	4
WC	(United States) S Rogers	6	6
(Romania) S Halep	6	2	2
20	(Spain) C Suárez Navarro	3	6	6
32	(Germany) S Lisicki	6	6
(Sweden) S Arvidsson	3	4
(Spain) MT Torró Flor	6	7
Q	(Israel) J Glushko	2	5
(Japan) A Morita	2	3
(Kazakhstan) Y Putintseva	6	6
(Netherlands) A Rus	1	2
5	(Italy) S Errani	6	6

Second round
(Puerto Rico) M Puig	6	7^{7}
(United States) M Keys	4	6^{2}
WC	(United States) S Rogers	6	4	4
20	(Spain) C Suárez Navarro	3	6	6
32	(Germany) S Lisicki	6	6
(Spain) MT Torró Flor	4	0
(Kazakhstan) Y Putintseva	1	1
5	(Italy) S Errani	6	6

Third round
(Puerto Rico) M Puig	4	5
20	(Spain) C Suárez Navarro	6	7
32	(Germany) S Lisicki	0	4
5	(Italy) S Errani	6	6

Fourth round
20	(Spain) C Suárez Navarro	7	4	3
5	(Italy) S Errani	5	6	6

=== Bottom half ===
==== Section 5 ====
First round
6	(China) N Li	6	6
(Spain) A Medina Garrigues	3	4
(United States) B Mattek-Sands	6	6
(Spain) L Domínguez Lino	4	1
(Germany) T Maria	3	6	0
Q	(Argentina) P Ormaechea	6	4	6
(United States) C Vandeweghe	0	6	2
27	(Kazakhstan) Y Shvedova	6	3	6
23	(Czech Republic) K Zakopalová	6^{3}	2
(Estonia) K Kanepi	7^{7}	6
(Switzerland) S Vögele	6	2	6
(United Kingdom) H Watson	4	6	4
WC	(Australia) A Barty	7	2	6
(Czech Republic) L Hradecká	5	6	1
(Russia) N Bratchikova	0	1
12	(Russia) M Kirilenko	6	6

Second round
6	(China) N Li	7	3	2
(United States) B Mattek-Sands	5	6	6
Q	(Argentina) P Ormaechea	6	7^{8}
27	(Kazakhstan) Y Shvedova	4	6^{6}
(Estonia) K Kanepi	6^{6}	6	6
(Switzerland) S Vögele	7^{8}	3	8
WC	(Australia) A Barty	3	1
12	(Russia) M Kirilenko	6	6

Third round
(United States) B Mattek-Sands	4	6	6
Q	(Argentina) P Ormaechea	6	1	3
(Switzerland) S Vögele	6^{3}	5
12	(Russia) M Kirilenko	7^{7}	7

Fourth round
(United States) B Mattek-Sands	5	4
12	(Russia) M Kirilenko	7	6

==== Section 6 ====
First round
13	(France) M Bartoli	7^{10}	4	7
(Belarus) O Govortsova	6^{8}	6	5
(Czech Republic) Kr Plíšková	2	0
Q	(Colombia) M Duque	6	6
(Hungary) M Czink	0	6^{1}
(Italy) F Schiavone	6	7^{7}
PR	(Italy) F Pennetta	6	4	0
21	(Belgium) K Flipkens	2	6	6
31	(France) A Cornet	7	6
(Portugal) MJ Koehler	5	2
(Romania) I-C Begu	3	2
(Spain) S Soler Espinosa	6	6
Q	(Czech Republic) S Záhlavová	2	1
(Germany) A Beck	6	6
(Russia) E Vesnina	1	4
3	(Belarus) V Azarenka	6	6

Second round
13	(France) M Bartoli	7^{7}	7
Q	(Colombia) M Duque	6^{5}	5
(Italy) F Schiavone	6	4	6
21	(Belgium) K Flipkens	1	6	3
31	(France) A Cornet	6	6
(Spain) S Soler Espinosa	1	3
(Germany) A Beck	4	3
3	(Belarus) V Azarenka	6	6

Third round
13	(France) M Bartoli	2	1
(Italy) F Schiavone	6	6
31	(France) A Cornet	6	3	1
3	(Belarus) V Azarenka	4	6	6

Fourth round
(Italy) F Schiavone	3	0
3	(Belarus) V Azarenka	6	6

==== Section 7 ====
First round
7	(Czech Republic) P Kvitová	6	4	6
WC	(France) A Rezaï	2	6	3
(China) S Peng	6	6
(Italy) C Giorgi	4	2
Q	(Slovakia) AK Schmiedlová	7^{7}	2	6
(Belgium) Y Wickmayer	6^{5}	6	2
(United States) J Hampton	7^{7}	3	9
25	(Czech Republic) L Šafářová	6^{5}	6	7
18	(Serbia) J Janković	6	7^{9}
(Slovakia) D Hantuchová	4	6^{7}
(Czech Republic) Ka Plíšková	6	5	3
(Spain) G Muguruza	4	7	6
(France) K Mladenovic	6	7
(United States) L Davis	0	5
(Japan) K Date-Krumm	0	2
9	(Australia) S Stosur	6	6

Second round
7	(Czech Republic) P Kvitová	6	6
(China) S Peng	4	3
Q	(Slovakia) AK Schmiedlová	5	2
(United States) J Hampton	7	6
18	(Serbia) J Janković	6	6
(Spain) G Muguruza	3	0
(France) K Mladenovic	4	3
9	(Australia) S Stosur	6	6

Third round
7	(Czech Republic) P Kvitová	1	6^{7}
(United States) J Hampton	6	7^{9}
18	(Serbia) J Janković	3	6	6
9	(Australia) S Stosur	6	3	4

Fourth round
(United States) J Hampton	0	2
18	(Serbia) J Janković	6	6

==== Section 8 ====
First round
16	(Slovakia) D Cibulková	6	6
(Ukraine) L Tsurenko	1	4
(New Zealand) M Erakovic	6	6
PR	(United Kingdom) E Baltacha	3	0
Q	(United States) V King	7^{7}	6
(Romania) A Cadanțu	6^{3}	1
(Italy) K Knapp	2	5
17	(United States) S Stephens	6	7
28	(Austria) T Paszek	4	3
(United States) M Oudin	6	6
(China) J Zheng	6	6
(Serbia) V Dolonc	4	1
(Canada) E Bouchard	6	7^{7}
(Bulgaria) T Pironkova	1	6^{2}
(Chinese Taipei) S-w Hsieh	2	1
2	(Russia) M Sharapova	6	6

Second round
16	(Slovakia) D Cibulková	2	6	4
(New Zealand) M Erakovic	6	2	6
Q	(United States) V King	1	3
17	(United States) S Stephens	6	6
(United States) M Oudin	3	1
(China) J Zheng	6	6
(Canada) E Bouchard	2	4
2	(Russia) M Sharapova	6	6

Third round
(New Zealand) M Erakovic	4	7^{7}	3
17	(United States) S Stephens	6	6^{5}	6
(China) J Zheng	1	5
2	(Russia) M Sharapova	6	7

Fourth round
17	(United States) S Stephens	4	3
2	(Russia) M Sharapova	6	6

== Road to the final ==
Since winning the French Open in 2002, Serena Williams had not advanced to the final of the event, last semifinal was in 2003 (lost to Henin). In 2008, she was the only former champion left in the draw, she lost to Katarina Srebotnik in the third round. In 2012, she lost in the first round to Virginie Razzano, a player ranked in the 100s. In 2013, however, she made quick work of her opponents advancing to the finals with an average match length of less than one hour and fifteen minutes. She had problems in just one match, in quarterfinals against Svetlana Kuznetsova, when she was down 2–0 and break points in third set. However, she won six of last seven games to close out the match.

After reaching quarterfinals without dropping set, Sharapova needed two three-setters to reach final. First, she met 18th seed Jelena Janković and dropped the first set 6–0. In that set Sharapova committed 20 errors to just two from Jankovic. However, Jankovic lost her opening service game in the second set, which looked to be key for Sharapova as she could cool down after a horrible first set. In the semifinal she faced third seed Victoria Azarenka. Sharapova won the first set convincingly, but lost the second in the same fashion. But she eventually eased to a 5–2 lead in the final set and finished the match two games later to reach her second French Open final.

== Final ==
First seeded Williams faced off against second seeded Maria Sharapova in the women's singles final. Williams came out aggressive, charging the net on the first point. Her aggression set up a triple break-point, but Sharapova fought back and held serve. She then broke Williams for a 2–0 lead. Williams broke back in the next game, then broke Sharapova twice more for a 6–4 first set. In the second set, Sharapova fought off five break points to hold in her opening serve. After Williams held serve, Sharapova dropped a break with two consecutive errors in the fourth game. From there, Williams went on to take a 5–4 lead with her serve coming up. She finished off the match with her tenth ace of the day. "She's always had a big serve," said Sharapova. "I think her second serve is better than it was in the past."

For Williams, it was her 31st consecutive victory, a career best. She has beaten Sharapova 13 times in a row. When asked by a reporter if she still wanted to retire at her peak, Williams replied "That's my goal, but have I peaked yet?" Commentary by Simon Briggs published by The Daily Telegraph described Williams' performance as "almost flawless". "Sharapova actually played a fine match," said Briggs. "But it is so difficult to attack an in-form Williams because she can shut you down with the quality of her serve."

By winning the 1 hour 46 minute match, Williams completed her second career Grand Slam. It was her 16th major title overall, moving her within six of Steffi Graf's modern era record of 22 such wins, and within eight of Margaret Court's all-time record. She also became the oldest women ever to win the French Open.

== Championship match statistics ==
Category	(United States) S. Williams	(Russia) Sharapova
1st serve %	35/51 (69%)	42/76 (55%)
1st serve points won	27 of 35 = 77%	20 of 42 = 48%
2nd serve points won	8 of 16 = 50%	20 of 34 = 59%
Total service points won	35 of 51 = 68.63%	40 of 76 = 52.63%
Aces	10	2
Double faults	0	4
Winners	29	10
Unforced errors	21	17
Net points won	11 of 14 = 79%	2 of 2 = 100%
Break points converted	4 of 15 = 27%	2 of 2 = 100%
Return points won	36 of 76 = 47%	16 of 51 = 31%
Total points won	71	56

Preceded by 2013 Australian Open – Women's singles	Grand Slam women's singles	Succeeded by 2013 Wimbledon Championships – Women's singles
