= Versmold =

- Town
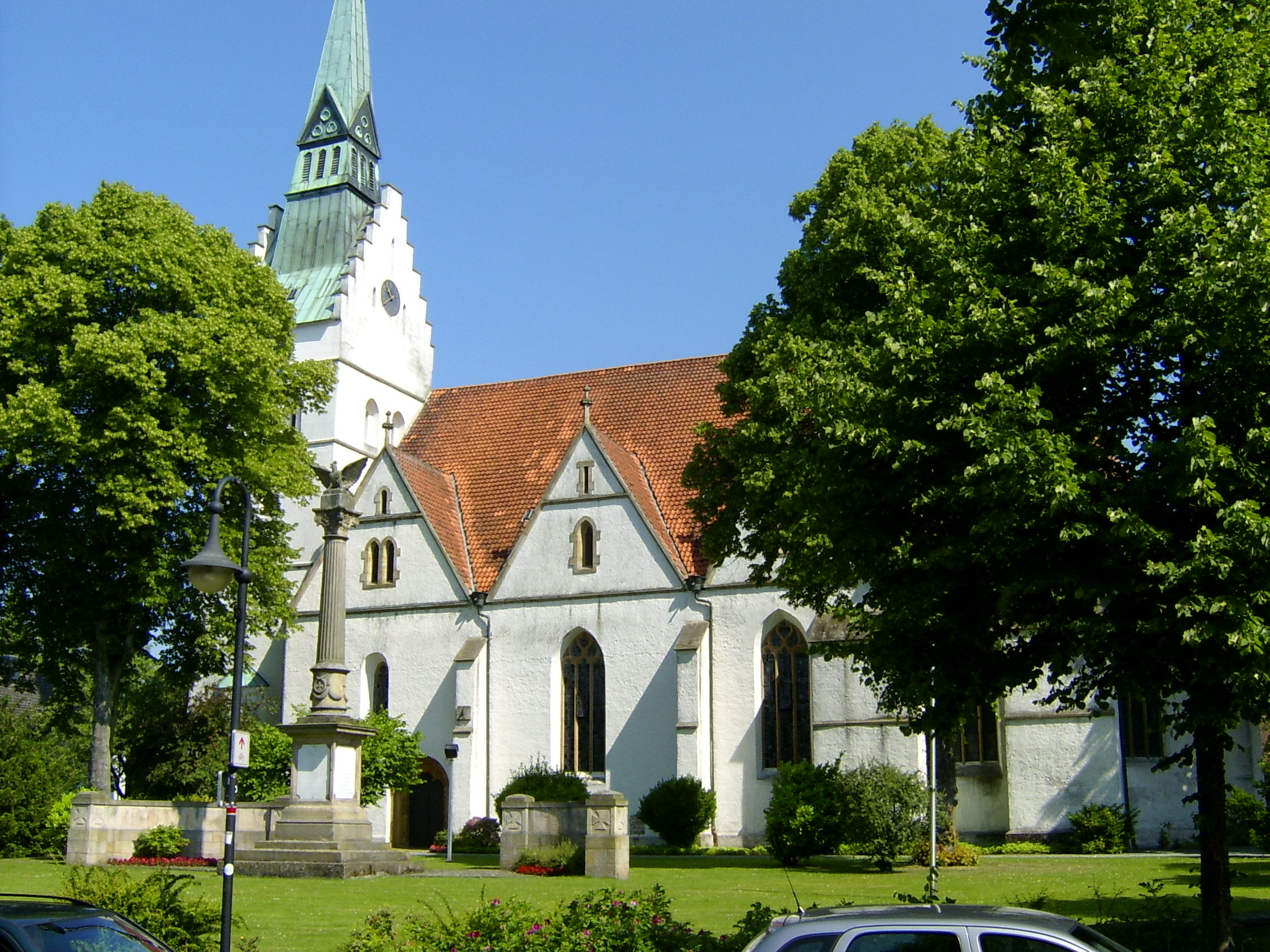
- St. Petri Church in Versmold

- Flag Coat of arms

- Location of Versmold within Gütersloh district
- Interactive map of Versmold
- Location within Germany Location within North Rhine-Westphalia
- Coordinates: 52°02′37″N 08°09′00″E
- Country: Germany
- State: North Rhine-Westphalia
- Admin. region: Detmold
- District: Gütersloh
- Subdivisions: 6

Government
  - Mayor (2020–25): Michael Meyer-Hermann (CDU)

Area
  - Total: 85.57 km^{2} (33.04 sq mi)
- Elevation: 70 m (230 ft)

Population (2025-12-31)
  - Total: 21,343
  - Density: 249.4/km^{2} (646.0/sq mi)
- Time zone: UTC+01:00 (CET)
  - Summer (DST): UTC+02:00 (CEST)
- Postal codes: 33775
- Dialling codes: 0 54 23
- Vehicle registration: GT
- Website: www.versmold.de

Versmold (German: [ˈfɛʁsmɔlt]; Westphalian: Vassem) is a town in Gütersloh District in the German state of North Rhine-Westphalia. It is located some 30 km west of Bielefeld.

== History ==
In 1096 Versmold was first mentioned in a document, and is thus one of the oldest known settlements in the region. The name "-mold" alludes to "melle", "mal" a location of a court.

Situated between the bishoprics Osnabrück and Münster, the possession of Versmold was disputed for a long time in the high Middle Ages. The population tried to protect themselves as well as they could. The St. Petri church was built as a "Wehrkirche" for defense.

After 1277, the situation changed when the counts of Ravensberg acquired possession of the Versmold region. Versmold formed the westernmost town of the historic county of Ravensberg with its capital Bielefeld. After the War of the Jülich Succession in 1614 the county came to Brandenburg and later to Prussia. Within predominantly Catholic Westphalia, the county of Ravensberg became finally Protestant. In 1719, the King of Prussia Friedrich Wilhelm I granted city rights to raise more taxes through excises. As consequence linen merchants settled in the city, and Versmold developed as a local center for linen and yarn-spinning, and in the later 19th century the production of sailing canvases became a worldwide export product. Linen weaving allowed the rural landless population to find an income. Their situation became dire when since the 1830s mechanical looms were introduced. The entrepreneur Conrad Wilhelm Delius (1807-1897) in Versmold was the one who built the first mechanized linen factory in Versmold. He received the brunt of the anger of the disenfranchised landless "heuerlinge" in 1848, because machines took away their livelihood.

Nevertheless, until the late nineteenth century the county remained poor and subsistence oriented. Between the 1650s and 1914, during the harvest season many young men who did not find any other source of income in the county looked for seasonal employment in the Netherlands. These men were commonly called 'Hollandgänger'.

Poverty without any local escape was a reason for many to leave for America. People closer to the rising industrial centers in western Westphalia, which was later called Ruhrgebiet, went to the coalmines and steel producing centers around Dortmund and Bottrop. Ravensberger, however, preferred the emigration to America, which promised them to become farmers. Since the 1830s more and more of the landless rural population left Versmold and the hamlets in the vicinity for America. The dire economic situation in the 1850s created a peak of emigration from Westphalia. The fear of Prussian conscriptions for the wars of German unification in the 1860s was another reason to quit. Many of them settled in the Midwest, especially in Franklin County, especially in and Texas.

After 1871 newly united Germany built up a navy, the linen and sailing canvas industry became especially prosperous. Most notably engaged in that industry was the family Delius. In the 1820s some family members emigrated to Mexico where they established a flourishing import-export business. By the late nineteenth century they had representations in Berlin and Hamburg. But not only the linen industry blossomed. The rural industry of distilleries prospered. Noteworthy is the distillery Brennerei Knemeyer in Hesselteich founded in 1870. They produced a schnaps made of grain, and juniper. Schnaps, a hard liquor was the usual form of alcohol consumption in the region. The rural art of sausage-making turned farms into factories in 1880 for which Versmold became famous in the twentieth century. Most noteworthy are the companies Wiltmann (founded 1887), Stockmeyer (founded 1913) and Reinert (founded 1931).

The 1930s saw an almost unnoticed cultural change. The language of the county and Versmold was for centuries Westphalian Platt, a language closer to Dutch than to Standard German. The 'Hollandgänger' conversed in their own vernacular when they were abroad. Through compulsory school attendance, a pressure by the state on 'responsible' parents, and the spread of the new medium of radio, parents began to talk to their children (born between 1925 and 1935) only in standard German, earlier in Versmold, later also in the neighboring villages and farmsteads. As in many regions under Prussian rule, Ravensberg and Versmold lost its native language almost within one generation. Westphalian Platt is currently only preserved in circles within the local preservation societies [Heimatverein] and some children's rhymes of the local Halloween tradition.

Versmold remained almost untouched by the suffering and changes of World War II. In April 1945, the city was taken by American forces. Soon the occupation was continued by the British. The immediate post-war time was worse than the war for the Versmolders. What followed was anarchy and marauding of 'foreign workers', which had been forced to work on Versmold's farms and factories. They took revenge and enjoyed their freedom.

Since even before World War II the city flourished mainly due to its meat-packing factories. Supply industries evolved around meat processing. Several forwarding companies specialized in food transportation. The largest of them, Kraftverkehr Nagel operates today in many countries. Some larger companies and factories also sold what they could not process often to small one-man meat dealers and small scale butchers. They in turn sold it on weekly markets mostly in the underprovisioned but prosperous industrial region of the Ruhrgebiet. Sometimes they created also their own sausage specialties. This profession was called Kleinfleischhaendler (small scale meat dealer) which became typical profession for Versmold in the 1950s and 1960s. This peculiarity faded out during the 1980s and 1990s.

The industry diversified after World War II. A major factory for bottle crown caps Brueninghaus developed out of a factory for bicycle and motorcycle saddles, called Metall und Leder. It is still one of the main industries in Versmold, and exports its bottle caps throughout the world. In 1945 a local entrepreneur Gustav Baumhoefer established a shoe factory first within Metall and Leder, than building his production halls just opposite the saddle factory producing under the brand name Ravensberger Schuhe. The company closed at the end of 1980 due to shifts in the world market for shoes and the lack of competitiveness. In 1949 a wood processing factory producing window and door frames was opened, the Wirus Werke; but it also shut down during the 1980s. Its mother company resides still in Guetersloh.

== Population ==
Historical population

Year	Pop.	±% p.a.
1965	16,535	—
1970	18,369	+2.13%
1975	18,623	+0.28%
1980	18,328	−0.32%
1985	17,162	−1.31%
1990	18,231	+1.22%
1995	19,680	+1.54%

Year	Pop.	±% p.a.
2000	20,397	+0.72%
2005	21,064	+0.65%
2010	20,985	−0.08%
2015	21,230	+0.23%
2020	21,697	+0.44%
2025	21,343	−0.33%

Source: Landesdatabank Nordrhein-Westfalen

== Memorials ==
As in many small German towns part of its modern history had become a visible expression within the cityscape. A small unimposing stone cross of the eleventh century in the middle of a traffic circle had been once the sign for a medieval rural court.

A bronze medallion of Otto von Bismarck, a bronze bust of the German emperor Wilhelm I and his popular but short reigning successor Friedrich III were signs of the patriotism and the Bismarck-cult in the 1880s and the early 1900s. In 1909, the Bismarck pyramid was built up with natural granite stone blocks centrally located in city's park (Stadtpark) and topped by a Prussian eagle. The latter became a victim of vandalism after World War I. In 1942, the bust of the liberal, but among the Nazis unpopular, emperor Friedrich III was melted down. Wilhelm's bust was transferred into the Stadtpark, which had become a haven for unwanted history. The bust is since more than 30 years damaged by vandalism and hard to find, hidden behind bushes. The Bismarck-medallion was removed from its central location and attached to one large red granite boulder which was leisurely placed under trees in a distance but still visible from the walkway.

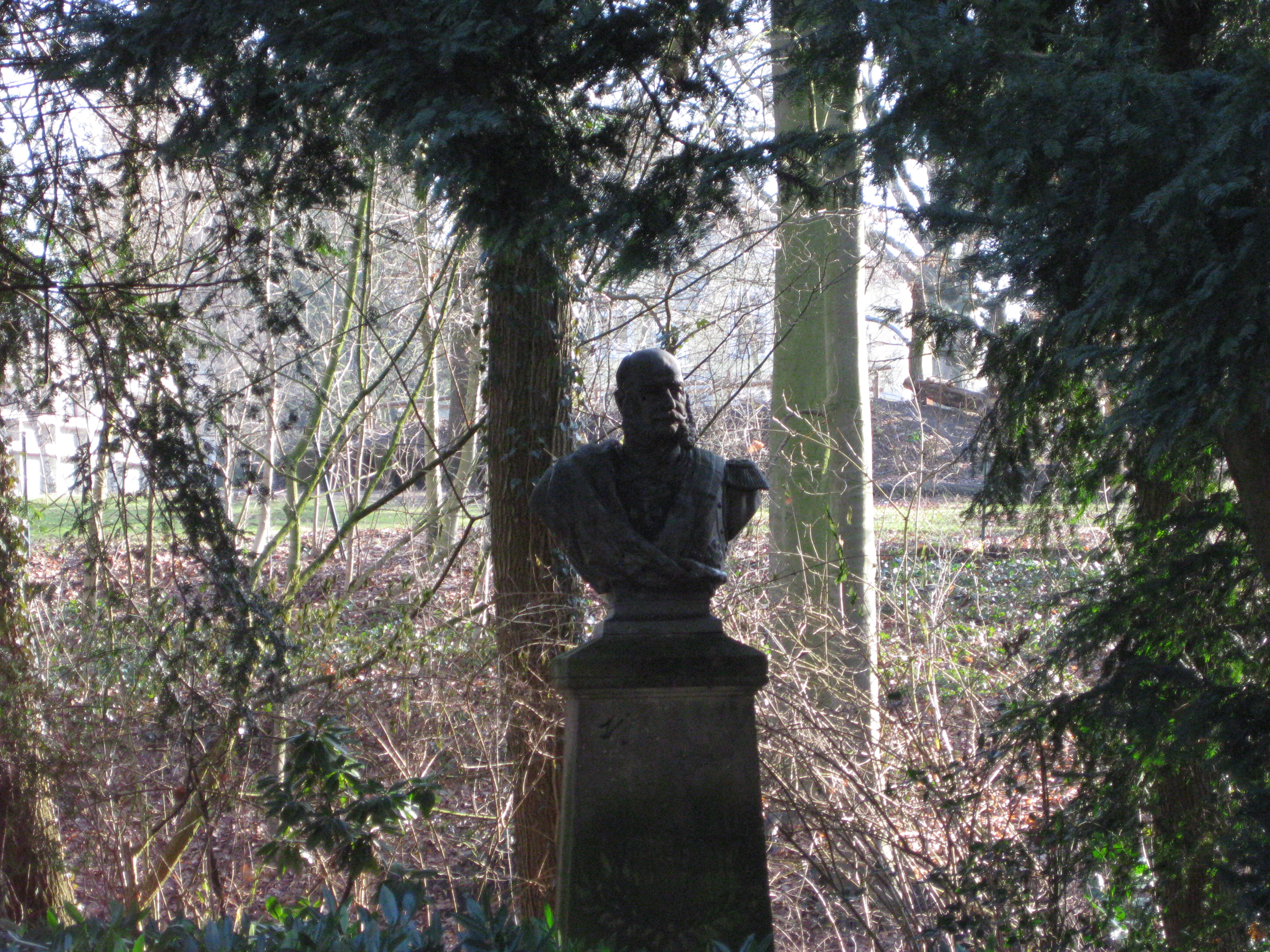
Hidden Bust of Wilhelm I

The names of the fallen soldiers of World War I from the municipality of Versmold are remembered on a monument in front of the Protestant St. Petri church, a column crowned by an eagle flanked on both sides with a wall telling the names of all fallen Versmolders (see image). The victims of World War II found in September 1961 a place of commemoration in a small park, which is now behind the town hall in the form of six meter high bronze crosses on a granite pedestal and a bronze flambeaux. It was designed by a Westphalian sculptor Bernhard Kleinhans from Sendenhorst. In difference to the then common memorials, it does not name the victims. This small park with a bronze lectern is staged for official ceremonies.

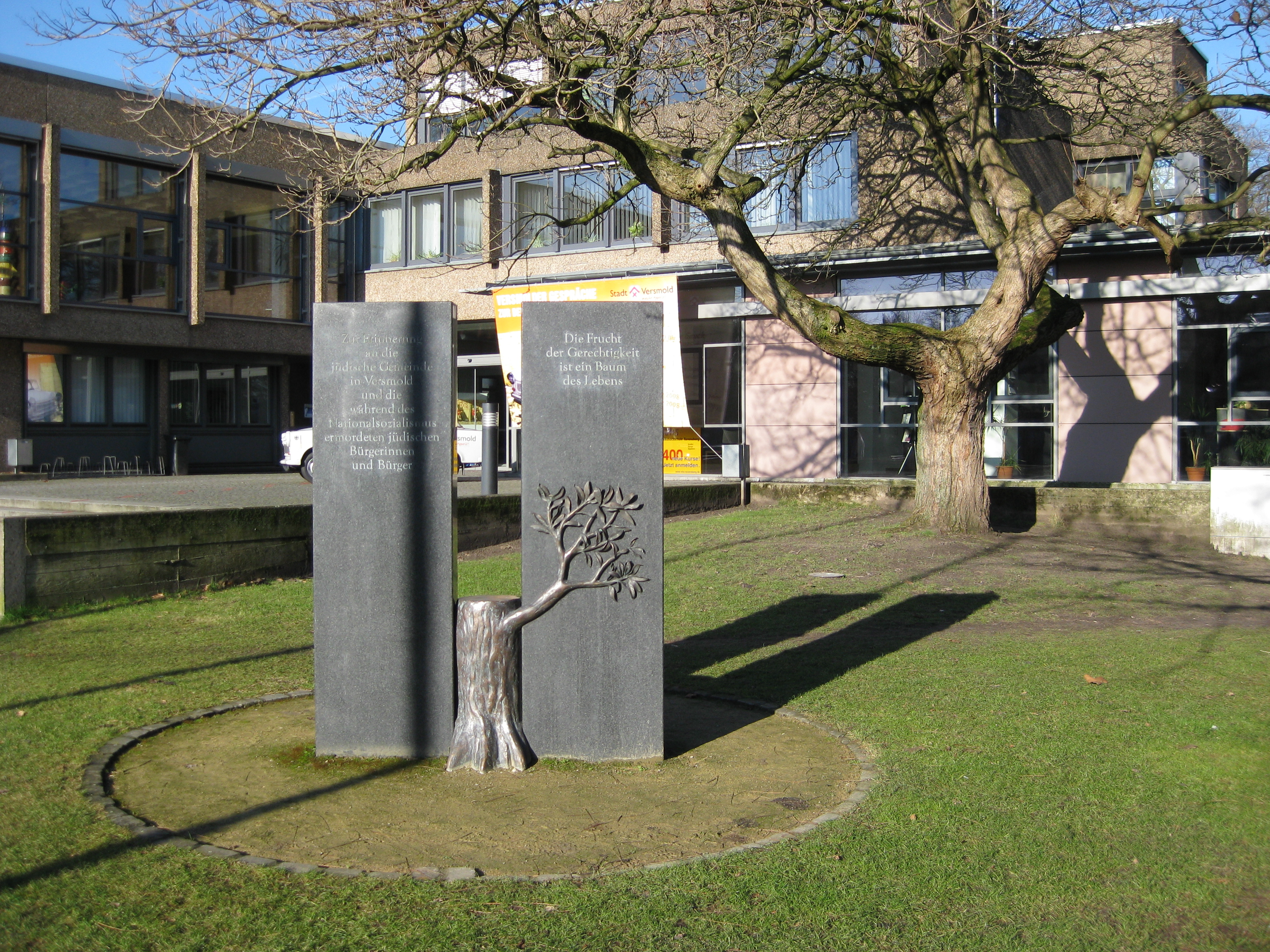
Memorial for the Jewish citizens in Versmold

In September 2000, a memorial for the murdered Jewish population was set up in the middle of the town, very prominently, right in front of the town hall. It lists the names of the local victims of the Holocaust. Most prominent among them figures the family Spiegel. The design was developed by two students and their teacher from the local highschool. The historian Reinhart Koselleck cited the difference in the naming of the murdered Jewish citizens and the anonymity of memory for the fallen soldiers and immediate victims of World War II by Kleinhans in Versmold as example of how the Germans deal with their recent history in the collective memory.

The new blossoming of the town after World War II is visualized by a bronze statue of a worker with a pig passing under his right leg. He carries in both hands a stick with six sausages dangling from it. It stands across the Protestant St.-Petri church on a modern (1980s) Italian style 'piazza'. This statue is locally known as "Schweinebrunnen" (pig's fountain)".

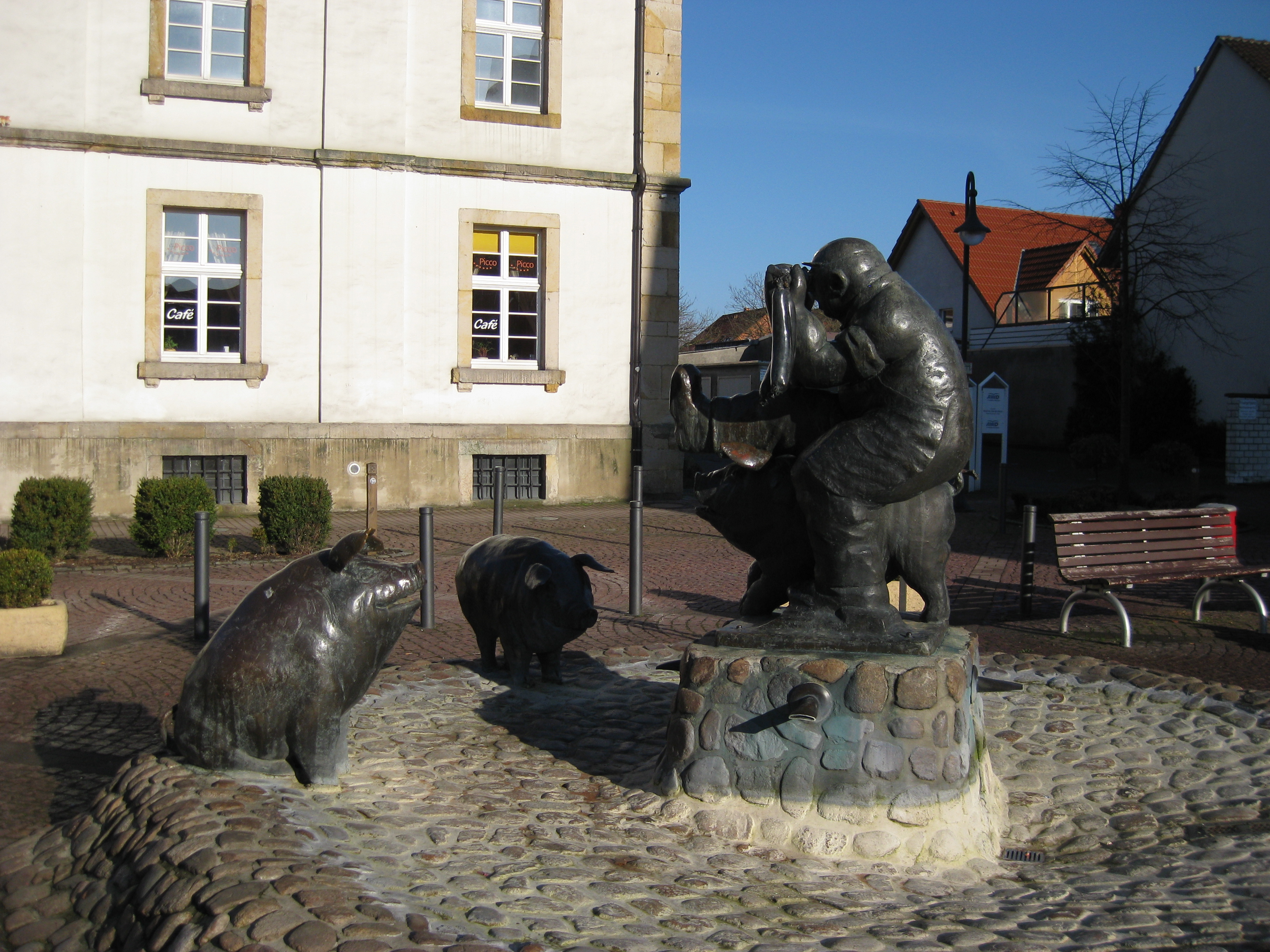
The "Schweinebrunnen"

== Communities forming the town ==
- Versmold
- Bockhorst
- Hesselteich
- Loxten
- Oesterweg
- Peckeloh

== Local Newspapers ==
- Haller Kreisblatt (with a daily page on local events). Oldest traditional newspaper for the western part of the county of Ravensberg.
