= Dinah Pfizenmaier =

German tennis player

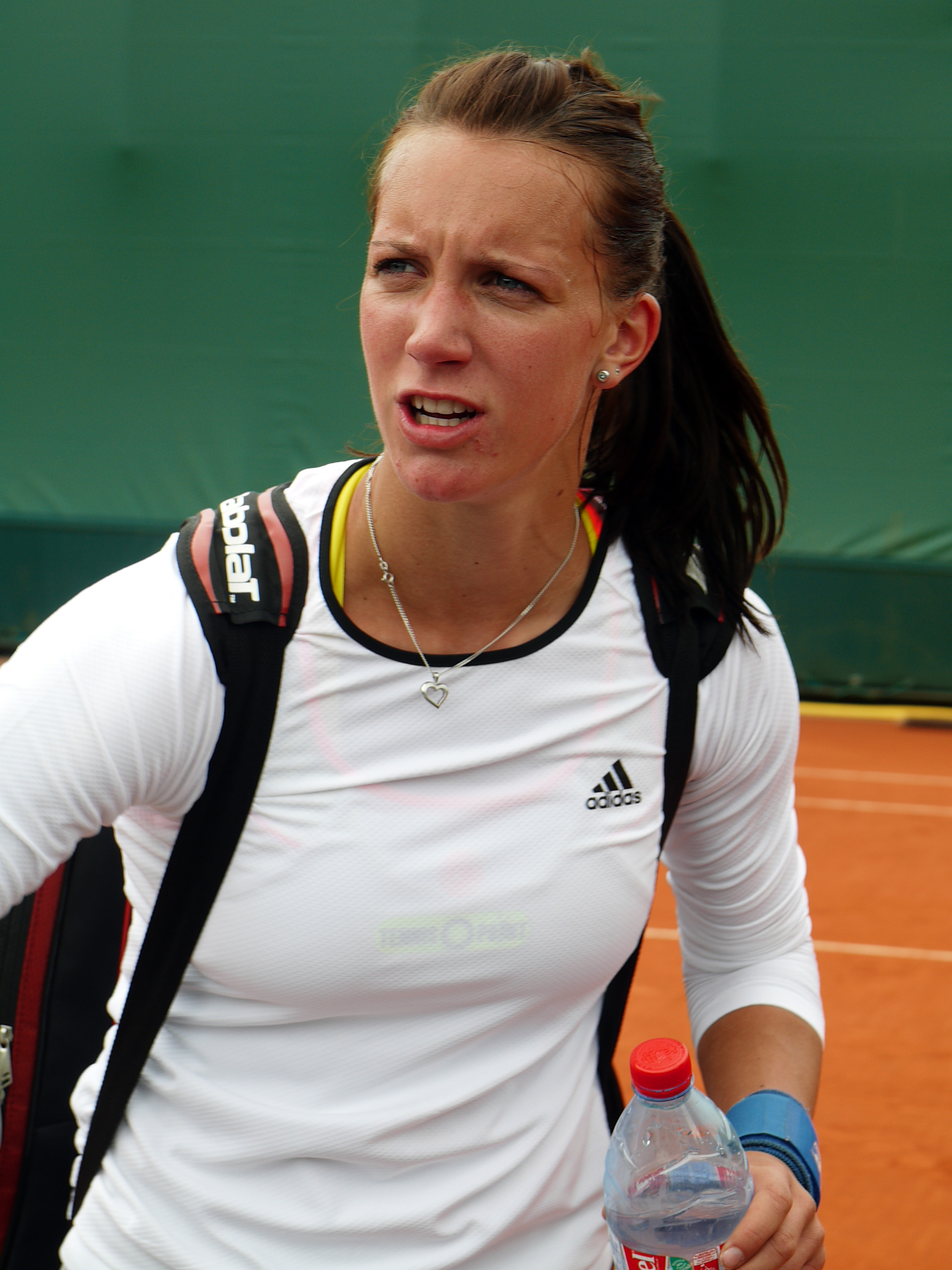
- Pfizenmaier at the 2013 French Open
- Country (sports): Germany
- Born: 13 January 1992 (age 33); Bielefeld, Germany
- Height: 1.71 m (5 ft 7 in)
- Plays: Right-handed (two-handed backhand)
- Prize money: $489,829

Singles
- Career record: 171–106
- Career titles: 9 ITF
- Highest ranking: No. 79 (17 March 2014)

Grand Slam singles results
- Australian Open: 1R (2014)
- French Open: 3R (2013)
- Wimbledon: 1R (2014)
- US Open: 1R (2013)

Doubles
- Career record: 31–31
- Career titles: 2 ITF
- Highest ranking: No. 245 (2 February 2015)

Dinah Pfizenmaier (born 13 January 1992) is a German former tennis player.

Pfizenmaier won nine singles and two doubles titles on the ITF Circuit in her career. On 17 March 2014, she reached her best singles ranking of world No. 79. On 2 February 2015, she peaked at No. 245 in the doubles rankings.

== Professional career ==
=== 2012 ===
Pfizenmaier made her Grand Slam debut at the 2012 French Open. She qualified for the main draw by defeating Kristýna Plíšková, Misaki Doi and Monica Puig. In the first round of the main draw, she defeated local talent Caroline Garcia to set up a clash with world No. 1, Victoria Azarenka. She lost the meeting in straight sets.

=== 2013 ===
Pfizenmaier qualified again for the 2013 French Open, defeating Chiara Scholl, Irina Khromacheva and Vera Dushevina. In the main draw she defeated Mandy Minella and rising star Urszula Radwańska. In round 3, she was defeated by fourth seed Agnieszka Radwańska.

=== 2014 ===
At the French Open in 2014, Pfizenmaier defeated Estrella Cabeza Candela in the first round, but lost to Sara Errani in round two.

== Singles performance timeline ==
Key
W	F	SF	QF	#R	RR	Q#	DNQ	A	NH

(W) winner; (F) finalist; (SF) semifinalist; (QF) quarterfinalist; (#R) rounds 4, 3, 2, 1; (RR) round-robin stage; (Q#) qualification round; (DNQ) did not qualify; (A) absent; (NH) not held; (SR) strike rate (events won / competed); (W–L) win–loss record.

Only WTA Tour and Grand Slam tournament main-draw results are considered in the career statistics.

Tournament	2011	2012	2013	2014	2015	2016	2017	SR	W–L
Grand Slam tournaments
Australian Open	A	A	Q1	1R	A	A	A	0 / 1	0–1
French Open	A	2R	3R	2R	1R	A	A	0 / 4	4–4
Wimbledon	A	Q2	Q1	1R	A	A	A	0 / 1	0–1
US Open	A	Q1	1R	Q2	A	Q1	Q1	0 / 1	0–1
Win–loss	0–0	1–1	2–2	1–3	0–1	0–0	0–0	0 / 7	4–7
Career statistics
Tournaments	0	2	6	10	3	0	0	21	
Overall win–loss	0–0	1–2	4–6	6–10	3–3	0–0	0–0	14–21	
Year-end ranking	271	158	98	125	249	–	854	40%	

== ITF Circuit finals ==
=== Singles: 13 (9–4) ===
Legend $100,000 tournaments (0–0) $75,000 tournaments (0–0) $50,000 tournaments (1–1) $25,000 tournaments (3–1) $10/15,000 tournaments (5–2)	Finals by surface Hard (2–1) Clay (6–3) Grass (0–0) Carpet (1–0)

Result	No.	Date	Tournament	Surface	Opponent	Score
Loss	1.	25 July 2011	ITF Tampere, Finland	Clay	(Finland) Piia Suomalainen	5–7, 0–6
Win	1.	22 August 2011	ITF Braunschweig, Germany	Clay	(Germany) Syna Kayser	7–6^{(5)}, 6–1
Win	2.	12 September 2011	ITF Rotterdam, Netherlands	Clay	(Liechtenstein) Stephanie Vogt	3–6, 6–1, 6–1
Win	3.	26 September 2011	ITF Plovdiv, Bulgaria	Clay	(Serbia) Jovana Jakšić	6–4, 6–4
Win	4.	24 October 2011	ITF Netanya, Israel	Hard	(Turkey) Çağla Büyükakçay	7–6^{(5)}, 4–6, 6–1
Win	5.	23 January 2012	ITF Kaarst, Germany	Carpet (i)	(Belgium) Alison Van Uytvanck	6–4, 6–4
Win	6.	19 March 2012	ITF Phuket, Thailand	Hard (i)	(Thailand) Noppawan Lertcheewakarn	6–2, 6–4
Loss	2.	8 October 2012	ITF Sarajevo, Bosnia and Herzegovina	Clay	(Russia) Victoria Kan	6–4, 4–6, 2–5 ret.
Loss	3.	5 November 2012	ITF Benicarló, Spain	Hard	(Spain) Laura Pous Tió	4–6, 1–6
Win	7.	25 February 2013	ITF Mallorca, Spain	Clay	(Italy) Anastasia Grymalska	6–4, 4–6, 7–5
Win	8.	1 April 2013	ITF Torrent, Spain	Clay	(Germany) Justine Ozga	6–3, 6–1
Loss	4.	13 May 2013	ITF Saint-Gaudens, France	Clay	(Argentina) Paula Ormaechea	3–6, 6–3, 4–6
Win	9.	1 July 2013	ITF Versmold, Germany	Clay	(Ukraine) Maryna Zanevska	6–4, 4–6, 6–4

=== Doubles: 5 (2–3) ===
Legend $100,000 tournaments (0–0) $75,000 tournaments (0–0) $50,000 tournaments (0–0) $25,000 tournaments (1–2) $10,000 tournaments (1–1)	Finals by surface Hard (0–0) Clay (2–3) Grass (0–0) Carpet (0–0)

Result	No.	Date	Tournament	Surface	Partner	Opponents	Score
Loss	1.	15 August 2011	ITF Ratingen, Germany	Clay	(Germany) Katharina Hering	(Ukraine) Elizaveta Ianchuk (Australia) Karolina Wlodarczak	6–3, 1–6, 4–6
Win	1.	26 September 2011	ITF Plovdiv, Bulgaria	Clay	(Germany) Julia Wachaczyk	(Switzerland) Clelia Melena (Italy) Stefania Rubini	6–4, 7–5
Loss	2.	29 April 2013	ITF Wiesbaden, Germany	Clay	(Germany) Anna Zaja	(Canada) Gabriela Dabrowski (Canada) Sharon Fichman	3–6, 3–6
Win	2.	10 February 2014	ITF São Paulo, Brazil	Clay	(Spain) Beatriz García Vidagany	(Colombia) Mariana Duque (Brazil) Paula Cristina Gonçalves	7–6^{(8)}, 4–6, [10–8]
Loss	3.	16 March 2015	ITF Seville, Spain	Clay	(Austria) Sandra Klemenschits	(Georgia (country)) Ekaterine Gorgodze (Russia) Victoria Kan	3–6, 2–6
