= 2017 Ladies Open Hechingen =

- Date: 7–13 August
- Edition: 19th
- Category: ITF Women's Circuit
- Prize money: $60,000
- Surface: Clay
- Location: Hechingen, Germany

Champions

Singles
- (Germany) Tamara Korpatsch

Doubles
- (Italy) Camilla Rosatello / (Georgia (country)) Sofia Shapatava
← 2016 ·	Ladies Open Hechingen	· 2018 →

The 2017 Ladies Open Hechingen was a professional tennis tournament played on outdoor clay courts. It was the nineteenth edition of the tournament and was part of the 2017 ITF Women's Circuit. It took place in Hechingen, Germany, on 7–13 August 2017.

== Singles main draw entrants ==
=== Seeds ===
Country	Player	Rank^{1}	Seed
~~CZE~~	~~Denisa Allertová~~	~~91~~	~~1~~
NED	Richèl Hogenkamp	94	2
FRA	Pauline Parmentier	96	3
RUS	Anna Kalinskaya	148	4
TUR	İpek Soylu	161	5
ROU	Alexandra Cadanțu	172	6
SLO	Dalila Jakupović	180	7
GER	Antonia Lottner	183	8
CZE	Petra Krejsová	226	9

- ^{1} Rankings as of 31 July 2017.

=== Other entrants ===
The following players received a wildcard into the singles main draw:

- (Germany) Anna Gabric
- (Germany) Antonia Lottner
- (Germany) Lena Rüffer
- (Romania) Arina Gabriela Vasilescu

The following players received entry from the qualifying draw:

- (Hungary) Gréta Arn
- (Italy) Deborah Chiesa
- (Romania) Nicoleta Dascălu
- (Germany) Tamara Korpatsch

The following player received entry as a lucky loser:

- (Italy) Ludmilla Samsonova

== Champions ==
=== Singles ===
- (Germany) Tamara Korpatsch def. (Italy) Deborah Chiesa, 2–6, 7–6^{(7–5)}, 6–2

=== Doubles ===
- (Italy) Camilla Rosatello / (Georgia (country)) Sofia Shapatava def. (Germany) Romy Kölzer / (Germany) Lena Rüffer, 6–2, 6–4
