= 2018 Ladies Open Hechingen =

- Date: 6–12 August
- Edition: 20th
- Category: ITF Women's Circuit
- Prize money: $60,000
- Surface: Clay
- Location: Hechingen, Germany

Champions

Singles
- (Georgia (country)) Ekaterine Gorgodze

Doubles
- (Russia) Polina Monova / (Slovakia) Chantal Škamlová
← 2017 ·	Ladies Open Hechingen	· 2019 →

The 2018 Ladies Open Hechingen was a professional tennis tournament played on outdoor clay courts. It was the twentieth edition of the tournament and was part of the 2018 ITF Women's Circuit. It took place in Hechingen, Germany, on 6–12 August 2018.

== Singles main draw entrants ==
=== Seeds ===
Country	Player	Rank^{1}	Seed
GER	Carina Witthöft	100	1
GER	Antonia Lottner	152	2
SUI	Jil Teichmann	175	3
NED	Bibiane Schoofs	177	4
GER	Laura Siegemund	185	5
GEO	Ekaterine Gorgodze	197	6
SRB	Dejana Radanović	201	7
GER	Anna Zaja	208	8

- ^{1} Rankings as of 30 July 2018.

=== Other entrants ===
The following players received a wildcard into the singles main draw:

- (Germany) Anna Gabric
- (Germany) Alia Lex
- (Germany) Lena Rüffer
- (Germany) Carina Witthöft

The following players received entry from the qualifying draw:

- (Russia) Varvara Flink
- (Germany) Tamara Korpatsch
- (Germany) Jule Niemeier
- (Czech Republic) Anastasia Zarycká

The following players received entry as a lucky loser:

- (Greece) Eleni Kordolaimi

== Champions ==
=== Singles ===
- (Georgia (country)) Ekaterine Gorgodze def. (Germany) Laura Siegemund, 6–2, 6–1

=== Doubles ===
- (Russia) Polina Monova / (Slovakia) Chantal Škamlová def. (Kyrgyzstan) Ksenia Palkina / (Georgia (country)) Sofia Shapatava, 6–4, 6–3
