= 2023 Ladies Open Hechingen =

Tennis tournament

- Date: 31 July –6 August 2023
- Edition: 23rd
- Category: ITF Women's World Tennis Tour
- Prize money: $60,000
- Surface: Clay / Outdoor
- Location: Hechingen, Germany

Champions

Singles
- (Czech Republic) Brenda Fruhvirtová

Doubles
- Alena Fomina-Klotz / (North Macedonia) Lina Gjorcheska
| ← 2022 · | Ladies Open Hechingen | · 2024 → |

The 2023 Ladies Open Hechingen was a professional tennis tournament played on outdoor clay courts. It was the twenty-third edition of the tournament which was part of the 2023 ITF Women's World Tennis Tour. It took place in Hechingen, Germany between 31 July and 6 August 2023.

== Champions ==
=== Singles ===
- (Czech Republic) Brenda Fruhvirtová def. (Slovenia) Živa Falkner, 6–3, 6–1

=== Doubles ===
- Alena Fomina-Klotz / (North Macedonia) Lina Gjorcheska def. (Georgia (country)) Ekaterine Gorgodze / (Germany) Katharina Hobgarski, 6–2, 6–4

== Singles main draw entrants ==
=== Seeds ===
| Country | Player | Rank^{1} | Seed |
|---|---|---|---|
| CZE | Brenda Fruhvirtová | 137 | 1 |
| ESP | Jéssica Bouzas Maneiro | 151 | 2 |
| HUN | Anna Bondár | 155 | 3 |
| ARG | María Lourdes Carlé | 160 | 4 |
| AUS | Priscilla Hon | 176 | 5 |
| BEL | Marie Benoît | 188 | 6 |
| MKD | Lina Gjorcheska | 252 | 7 |
| SLO | Dalila Jakupović | 267 | 8 |

- ^{1} Rankings are as of 24 July 2023.

=== Other entrants ===
The following players received wildcards into the singles main draw:

- (Germany) Carolina Kuhl
- (Germany) Emily Seibold
- (Germany) Ella Seidel
- (Germany) Alexandra Vecic

The following players received entry from the qualifying draw:

- (Italy) Silvia Ambrosio
- (Slovenia) Živa Falkner
- (Bulgaria) Denislava Glushkova
- (Japan) Nagi Hanatani
- (Czech Republic) Aneta Kučmová
- Sofya Lansere
- Evialina Laskevich
- (Germany) Julia Middendorf
