= 2017 Ladies Open Hechingen – Singles =

Singles
- 2017 Ladies Open Hechingen

Final
- Champion: (Germany) Tamara Korpatsch
- Runner-up: (Italy) Deborah Chiesa
- Score: 2–6, 7–6^{(7–5)}, 6–2

Events
| Singles | Doubles |
| ← 2016 · | Ladies Open Hechingen | · 2018 → |

Dalila Jakupović was the defending champion, but lost in the second round to Deborah Chiesa.

Tamara Korpatsch won the title, defeating Chiesa in the final 2–6, 7–6^{(7–5)}, 6–2.

== Seeds ==
1. (Czech Republic) Denisa Allertová (withdrew)
2. (Netherlands) Richèl Hogenkamp (second round)
3. (France) Pauline Parmentier (first round)
4. (Russia) Anna Kalinskaya (second round)
5. (Turkey) İpek Soylu (first round)
6. (Romania) Alexandra Cadanțu (semifinals, retired)
7. (Slovenia) Dalila Jakupović (second round)
8. (Germany) Antonia Lottner (first round)
9. (Czech Republic) Petra Krejsová (first round)

== Draw ==
=== Key ===
- Q = Qualifier
- WC = Wild card
- LL = Lucky loser
- Alt = Alternate
- SE = Special exempt
- PR = Protected ranking
- ITF = ITF entry
- JE = Junior exempt
- w/o = Walkover
- r = Retired
- d = Defaulted
- SR = Special ranking

=== Finals ===
Semifinals
(Slovakia) Chantal Škamlová | 2 | 3
Q | (Italy) Deborah Chiesa | 6 | 6
Q | (Germany) Tamara Korpatsch | 7 | 4
6 | (Romania) Alexandra Cadanțu | 5 | 1^{r}

Final
Q | (Italy) Deborah Chiesa | 6 | 6^{5} | 2
Q | (Germany) Tamara Korpatsch | 2 | 7^{7} | 6

=== Top half ===
First round
9 | (Czech Republic) P Krejsová | 3 | 1
(Switzerland) P Schnyder | 6 | 6
Q | (Romania) N Dascălu | 7^{10} | 7^{7}
(Germany) A Zaja | 6^{8} | 6^{5}
Q | (Hungary) G Arn | 4 | 6^{8}
(Austria) J Grabher | 6 | 7^{10}
(Slovakia) C Škamlová | 6 | 3 | 6
8/WC | (Germany) A Lottner | 2 | 6 | 3
3 | (France) P Parmentier | 0 | 3
(Russia) V Ivakhnenko | 6 | 6
WC | (Germany) A Gabric | 6 | 2 | 6
(Mexico) R Zarazúa | 2 | 6 | 1
LL | (Italy) L Samsonova | 3 | 0^{r}
Q | (Italy) D Chiesa | 6 | 2
(Germany) K Hobgarski | 0 | 2
7 | (Slovenia) D Jakupović | 6 | 6

Second round
(Switzerland) P Schnyder | 6 | 6
Q | (Romania) N Dascălu | 1 | 0
(Austria) J Grabher | 6 | 4 | 3
(Slovakia) C Škamlová | 4 | 6 | 6
(Russia) V Ivakhnenko | 5 | 6 | 0
WC | (Germany) A Gabric | 7 | 3 | 6
Q | (Italy) D Chiesa | 6 | 6
7 | (Slovenia) D Jakupović | 2 | 2

Quarterfinals
(Switzerland) P Schnyder | 6 | 3 | 5
(Slovakia) C Škamlová | 2 | 6 | 7
WC | (Germany) A Gabric | 1 | 2
Q | (Italy) D Chiesa | 6 | 6

Semifinals
(Slovakia) C Škamlová | 2 | 3
Q | (Italy) D Chiesa | 6 | 6

=== Bottom half ===
First round
5 | (Turkey) İ Soylu | 4 | 6 | 2
(Georgia (country)) S Shapatava | 6 | 0 | 6
Q | (Germany) T Korpatsch | 6 | 6
WC | (Romania) AG Vasilescu | 2 | 1
(Poland) M Fręch | 6 | 6
(Czech Republic) J Malečková | 2 | 2
(Poland) K Piter | 2 | 6 | 3
4 | (Russia) A Kalinskaya | 6 | 3 | 6
6 | (Romania) A Cadanțu | 7^{7} | 6
(Serbia) D Radanović | 6^{3} | 4
WC | (Germany) L Rüffer | 2 | 4
(Bulgaria) I Shinikova | 6 | 6
(Croatia) T Mrdeža | 7^{7} | 4 | 2
(Italy) J Pieri | 6^{5} | 6 | 6
(Italy) C Rosatello | 1 | 3
2 | (Netherlands) R Hogenkamp | 6 | 6

Second round
(Georgia (country)) S Shapatava | 3 | 6 | 3
Q | (Germany) T Korpatsch | 6 | 4 | 6
(Poland) M Fręch | 6 | 6
4 | (Russia) A Kalinskaya | 0 | 3
6 | (Romania) A Cadanțu | 2 | 6 | 6
(Bulgaria) I Shinikova | 6 | 4 | 4
(Italy) J Pieri | 3 | 7 | 6
2 | (Netherlands) R Hogenkamp | 6 | 5 | 0

Quarterfinals
Q | (Germany) T Korpatsch | 6 | 6
(Poland) M Fręch | 2 | 2
6 | (Romania) A Cadanțu | 3 | 6 | 7^{7}
(Italy) J Pieri | 6 | 2 | 6^{2}

Semifinals
Q | (Germany) T Korpatsch | 7 | 4
6 | (Romania) A Cadanțu | 5 | 1^{r}
