= 2019 Ladies Open Hechingen =

- Date: 5–11 August 2019
- Edition: 21st
- Category: ITF Women's World Tennis Tour
- Prize money: $60,000
- Surface: Clay
- Location: Hechingen, Germany

Champions

Singles
- (Austria) Barbara Haas

Doubles
- (Romania) Cristina Dinu / (North Macedonia) Lina Gjorcheska
← 2018 ·	Ladies Open Hechingen	· 2022 →

The 2019 Ladies Open Hechingen was a professional tennis tournament played on outdoor clay courts. It was the twenty-first edition of the tournament which was part of the 2019 ITF Women's World Tennis Tour. It took place in Hechingen, Germany between 5 and 11 August 2019.

== Singles main-draw entrants ==
=== Seeds ===
Country	Player	Rank^{1}	Seed
GER	Tamara Korpatsch	115	1
SLO	Dalila Jakupović	144	2
NED	Bibiane Schoofs	156	3
AUT	Barbara Haas	161	4
GER	Katharina Hobgarski	200	5
ROU	Alexandra Cadanțu	217	6
ESP	Georgina García Pérez	218	7
AUT	Julia Grabher	239	8

- ^{1} Rankings are as of 29 July 2019.

=== Other entrants ===
The following players received wildcards into the singles main draw:

- (Germany) Katharina Hobgarski
- (Germany) Laura Schaeder
- (Germany) Carmen Schultheiss
- (Germany) Alexandra Vecic

The following players received entry from the qualifying draw:

- (Latvia) Kamilla Bartone
- (Czech Republic) Michaela Bayerlová
- (Germany) Anna Gabric
- (Greece) Eleni Kordolaimi
- (Germany) Tayisiya Morderger
- (Brazil) Teliana Pereira
- (Norway) Melanie Stokke
- (Germany) Julia Wachaczyk

== Champions ==
=== Singles ===
- (Austria) Barbara Haas def. (Serbia) Olga Danilović, 6–2, 6–1

=== Doubles ===
- (Romania) Cristina Dinu / (North Macedonia) Lina Gjorcheska def. (Serbia) Olga Danilović / (Spain) Georgina García Pérez, 4–6, 7–5, [10–7]
