= 2024 Ladies Open Hechingen – Singles =

Singles
- 2024 Ladies Open Hechingen

Final
- Champion: (Hungary) Anna Bondár
- Runner-up: Ekaterina Makarova
- Score: 6–0, 6–2

Events
Singles	Doubles
← 2023 ·	Ladies Open Hechingen	· 2025 →

Brenda Fruhvirtová was the defending champion, but retired from her first round match against Mara Guth.

Anna Bondár won the title, defeating Ekaterina Makarova in the final, 6–0, 6–2.

== Seeds ==
1. (Czech Republic) Brenda Fruhvirtová (first round, retired)
2. (Hungary) Anna Bondár (champion)
3. (Latvia) Darja Semeņistaja (quarterfinals)
4. (Germany) Noma Noha Akugue (semifinals)
5. Ekaterina Makarova (final)
6. (Germany) Mona Barthel (second round)
7. (Slovenia) Dalila Jakupović (first round)
8. Julia Avdeeva (first round)

== Draw ==
=== Key ===
- Q = Qualifier
- WC = Wild card
- LL = Lucky loser
- Alt = Alternate
- SE = Special exempt
- PR = Protected ranking
- ITF = ITF entry
- JE = Junior exempt
- w/o = Walkover
- r = Retired
- d = Defaulted
- SR = Special ranking

=== Finals ===
Semifinals
5	Ekaterina Makarova	3	6	6
4	(Germany) Noma Noha Akugue	6	3	2
JE	(Czech Republic) Darja Viďmanová	2	0
2	(Hungary) Anna Bondár	6	6

Final
5	Ekaterina Makarova	0	2
2	(Hungary) Anna Bondár	6	6

=== Top half ===
First round
1	(Czech Republic) B Fruhvirtová	1	0^{r}
WC	(Germany) M Guth	6	2
Q	(South Korea) S-h Park	3	0
(Belgium) M Benoît	6	6
Q	(Germany) E Seibold	7	1	6
(Czech Republic) T Martincová	5	6	0
A Charaeva	3	2
5	E Makarova	6	6
4	(Germany) N Noha Akugue	6	7
Q	A Ibragimova	4	5
Q	(Georgia (country)) E Gorgodze	7	6
Q	(Switzerland) F Ganz	5	3
WC	(Germany) J Middendorf	6	6
LL	(Georgia (country)) S Shapatava	4	0
(Belgium) A Van Uytvanck	6	6
8	J Avdeeva	0	4

Second round
WC	(Germany) M Guth	6	6^{6}	4
(Belgium) M Benoît	2	7^{8}	6
Q	(Germany) E Seibold	2	3
5	E Makarova	6	6
4	(Germany) N Noha Akugue	6	6
Q	(Georgia (country)) E Gorgodze	4	1
WC	(Germany) J Middendorf	6	6
(Belgium) A Van Uytvanck	3	3

Quarterfinals
(Belgium) M Benoît	3	6^{5}
5	E Makarova	6	7^{7}
4	(Germany) N Noha Akugue	6	6
WC	(Germany) J Middendorf	3	2

Semifinals
5	E Makarova	3	6	6
4	(Germany) N Noha Akugue	6	3	2

=== Bottom half ===
First round
7	(Slovenia) D Jakupović	6	1	3
(Lithuania) J Mikulskytė	4	6	6
(Turkey) İ Öz	7^{7}	4	5
JE	(Czech Republic) D Viďmanová	6^{3}	6	7
(Czech Republic) J Štruplová	6	6
(Japan) Y Naito	1	2
E Pridankina	3	4
3	(Latvia) D Semeņistaja	6	6
6	(Germany) M Barthel	6	6^{3}	6
Q	(Australia) P Hule	2	7^{7}	4
(Greece) S Sakellaridi	2	7^{7}	4
Q	M Melnikova	6	6^{4}	6
(Belgium) H Vandewinkel	6	6
Q	(United States) R McAdoo	1	3
WC	(Germany) M Vogt	2	0
2	(Hungary) A Bondár	6	6

Second round
(Lithuania) J Mikulskytė	6	6^{2}	5
JE	(Czech Republic) D Viďmanová	0	7^{7}	7
(Czech Republic) J Štruplová	3	3
3	(Latvia) D Semeņistaja	6	6
6	(Germany) M Barthel	6	5	4
Q	M Melnikova	2	7	6
(Belgium) H Vandewinkel	6	3	3
2	(Hungary) A Bondár	2	6	6

Quarterfinals
JE	(Czech Republic) D Viďmanová	7^{8}	6
3	(Latvia) D Semeņistaja	6^{6}	1
Q	M Melnikova	6	4	2
2	(Hungary) A Bondár	1	6	6

Semifinals
JE	(Czech Republic) D Viďmanová	2	0
2	(Hungary) A Bondár	6	6
