= 2022 Ladies Open Hechingen =

Tennis tournament

- Date: 1–7 August 2022
- Edition: 22nd
- Category: ITF Women's World Tennis Tour
- Prize money: $60,000
- Surface: Clay / Outdoor
- Location: Hechingen, Germany

Champions

Singles
- (Croatia) Lea Bošković

Doubles
- Irina Khromacheva / Diana Shnaider
← 2019 ·	Ladies Open Hechingen	· 2023 →

The 2022 Ladies Open Hechingen was a professional tennis tournament played on outdoor clay courts. It was the twenty-second edition of the tournament which was part of the 2022 ITF Women's World Tennis Tour. It took place in Hechingen, Germany between 1 and 7 August 2022.

== Champions ==
=== Singles ===
- (Croatia) Lea Bošković def. (Germany) Noma Noha Akugue, 7–5, 3–6, 6–4

=== Doubles ===
- Irina Khromacheva / Diana Shnaider def. (Serbia) Tamara Čurović / (United States) Chiara Scholl, 6–2, 6–3

== Singles main draw entrants ==
=== Seeds ===
Country	Player	Rank^{1}	Seed
AUS	Jaimee Fourlis	151	1
AUT	Sinja Kraus	208	2
SUI	Stefanie Vögele	218	3
CZE	Anna Sisková	240	4
	Diana Shnaider	266	5
GBR	Sarah Beth Grey	278	6
	Irina Khromacheva	288	7
	Ekaterina Makarova	313	8

- ^{1} Rankings are as of 25 July 2022.

=== Other entrants ===
The following players received wildcards into the singles main draw:

- (Germany) Noma Noha Akugue
- (Germany) Ella Seidel
- (Germany) Joëlle Steur
- (Germany) Alexandra Vecic

The following player received entry into the singles main draw using a protected ranking:

- (Italy) Jessica Pieri

The following players received entry from the qualifying draw:

- (Germany) Kathleen Kanev
- (Germany) Julia Middendorf
- (Germany) Tayisiya Morderger
- (France) Victoria Muntean
- (Greece) Sapfo Sakellaridi
- (United States) Chiara Scholl
- (Bulgaria) Julia Terziyska
- (United States) Vivian Wolff
