= 2018 Ladies Open Hechingen – Doubles =

Doubles
- 2018 Ladies Open Hechingen

Final
- Champions: (Russia) Polina Monova (Slovakia) Chantal Škamlová
- Runners-up: (Kyrgyzstan) Ksenia Palkina (Georgia (country)) Sofia Shapatava
- Score: 6–4, 6–3

Events
Singles	Doubles
← 2017 ·	Ladies Open Hechingen	· 2019 →

Camilla Rosatello and Sofia Shapatava are the defending champions, but Rosatello chose not to participate.

Shapatava partnered alongside Ksenia Palkina, but lost in the final to Polina Monova and Chantal Škamlová, 6–4, 6–3.

== Seeds ==
1. (Italy) Anastasia Grymalska / (United States) Chiara Scholl (first round)
2. (Russia) Polina Monova / (Slovakia) Chantal Škamlová (champions)
3. (Romania) Cristina Dinu / (Czech Republic) Anastasia Zarycká (first round)
4. (Croatia) Tena Lukas / (Croatia) Tereza Mrdeža (quarterfinals)

== Draw ==
=== Key ===
- Q = Qualifier
- WC = Wild card
- LL = Lucky loser
- Alt = Alternate
- SE = Special exempt
- PR = Protected ranking
- ITF = ITF entry
- JE = Junior exempt
- w/o = Walkover
- r = Retired
- d = Defaulted
- SR = Special ranking

=== Draw ===
First round
1	(Italy) A Grymalska (United States) C Scholl	5	4
(Italy) G Gatto-Monticone (Slovakia) M Hončová	7	6
(Germany) A Lex (Romania) AG Vasilescu	6^{5}	4
(Russia) K Bekker (Venezuela) A Uzcátegui	7^{7}	6
4	(Croatia) T Lukas (Croatia) T Mrdeža	2	6	[10]
(Canada) P Januskova (Turkey) M Sezer	6	4	[8]
(Greece) E Daniilidou (Italy) F Prati	0	2
(Kyrgyzstan) K Palkina (Georgia (country)) S Shapatava	6	6
(Germany) A Gabric (Germany) J Niemeier	6	6
(Germany) P Böntgen (Germany) C Schultheiss	1	0
(Germany) L Rüffer (Germany) A Zaja	6	6
3	(Romania) C Dinu (Czech Republic) A Zarycká	4	2
WC	(Germany) So Diebold (Germany) St Diebold	1	0
(Poland) K Piter (Chile) D Seguel	6	6
(Uzbekistan) A Khabibulina (Greece) E Kordolaimi	6^{4}	1
2	(Russia) P Monova (Slovakia) C Škamlová	7^{7}	6

Quarterfinals
(Italy) G Gatto-Monticone (Slovakia) M Hončová	6	7
(Russia) K Bekker (Venezuela) A Uzcátegui	4	5
4	(Croatia) T Lukas (Croatia) T Mrdeža	3	5
(Kyrgyzstan) K Palkina (Georgia (country)) S Shapatava	6	7
(Germany) A Gabric (Germany) J Niemeier	1	5
(Germany) L Rüffer (Germany) A Zaja	6	7
(Poland) K Piter (Chile) D Seguel	6^{5}	7^{7}	[10]
2	(Russia) P Monova (Slovakia) C Škamlová	7^{7}	6^{4}	[12]

Semifinals
(Italy) G Gatto-Monticone (Slovakia) M Hončová	4	2
(Kyrgyzstan) K Palkina (Georgia (country)) S Shapatava	6	6
(Germany) L Rüffer (Germany) A Zaja
2	(Russia) P Monova (Slovakia) C Škamlová	w/o

Final
(Kyrgyzstan) K Palkina (Georgia (country)) S Shapatava	4	3
2	(Russia) P Monova (Slovakia) C Škamlová	6	6
