= 2024 Ladies Open Hechingen =

Tennis tournament

- Date: 29 July–4 August 2024
- Edition: 24th
- Category: ITF Women's World Tennis Tour
- Prize money: $60,000
- Surface: Clay / Outdoor
- Location: Hechingen, Germany

Champions

Singles
- (Hungary) Anna Bondár

Doubles
- (Czech Republic) Michaela Bayerlová / (Georgia (country)) Sofia Shapatava
← 2023 ·	Ladies Open Hechingen	· 2025 →

The 2024 Ladies Open Hechingen was a professional tennis tournament played on outdoor clay courts. It was the twenty-fourth edition of the tournament, which was part of the 2024 ITF Women's World Tennis Tour. It took place in Hechingen, Germany, between 29 July and 4 August 2024.

== Champions ==
=== Singles ===
- (Hungary) Anna Bondár def. Ekaterina Makarova, 6–0, 6–2

=== Doubles ===
- (Czech Republic) Michaela Bayerlová / (Georgia (country)) Sofia Shapatava def. (Germany) Anna Gabric / (Germany) Mia Mack, 6–2, 5–7, [10–6]

== Singles main draw entrants ==
=== Seeds ===
Country	Player	Rank	Seed
CZE	Brenda Fruhvirtová	90	1
HUN	Anna Bondár	99	2
LAT	Darja Semeņistaja	141	3
GER	Noma Noha Akugue	169	4
	Ekaterina Makarova	178	5
GER	Mona Barthel	193	6
SLO	Dalila Jakupović	200	7
	Julia Avdeeva	209	8

- Rankings are as of 22 July 2024.

=== Other entrants ===
The following players received wildcards into the singles main draw:

- (Germany) Mara Guth
- (Germany) Carolina Kuhl
- (Germany) Julia Middendorf
- (Germany) Marie Vogt

The following player received entry into the singles main draw through the College Accelerator Programme:

- (Czech Republic) Darja Viďmanová

The following players received entry from the qualifying draw:

- (Switzerland) Fiona Ganz
- (Georgia (country)) Ekaterine Gorgodze
- (Australia) Petra Hule
- Alevtina Ibragimova
- (United States) Rasheeda McAdoo
- Marina Melnikova
- (South Korea) Park So-hyun
- (Germany) Emily Seibold

The following player received entry as a lucky loser:

- (Georgia (country)) Sofia Shapatava
