= 2018 Ladies Open Hechingen – Singles =

Singles
- 2018 Ladies Open Hechingen

Final
- Champion: (Georgia (country)) Ekaterine Gorgodze
- Runner-up: (Germany) Laura Siegemund
- Score: 6–2, 6–1

Events
| Singles | Doubles |
| ← 2017 · | Ladies Open Hechingen | · 2019 → |

Tamara Korpatsch was the defending champion, but lost in the semifinals to Laura Siegemund.

Ekaterine Gorgodze won the title, defeating Siegemund in the final 6–2, 6–1.

== Seeds ==
1. (Germany) Carina Witthöft (first round; retired)
2. (Germany) Antonia Lottner (second round)
3. (Switzerland) Jil Teichmann (second round)
4. (Netherlands) Bibiane Schoofs (second round)
5. (Germany) Laura Siegemund (final)
6. (Georgia (country)) Ekaterine Gorgodze (champion)
7. (Serbia) Dejana Radanović (first round; retired)
8. (Germany) Anna Zaja (semifinals)

== Draw ==
=== Key ===
- Q = Qualifier
- WC = Wild card
- LL = Lucky loser
- Alt = Alternate
- SE = Special exempt
- PR = Protected ranking
- ITF = ITF entry
- JE = Junior exempt
- w/o = Walkover
- r = Retired
- d = Defaulted
- SR = Special ranking

=== Finals ===
Semifinals
6 | (Georgia (country)) Ekaterine Gorgodze | 7^{8} | 6
8 | (Germany) Anna Zaja | 6^{6} | 1
5 | (Germany) Laura Siegemund | 6 | 6
Q | (Germany) Tamara Korpatsch | 3 | 4

Final
6 | (Georgia (country)) Ekaterine Gorgodze | 6 | 6
5 | (Germany) Laura Siegemund | 2 | 1

=== Top half ===
First round
1/WC | (Germany) C Witthöft | 3 | 1^{r}
(Germany) K Hobgarski | 6 | 4
(Romania) A Roșca | 6 | 4 | 2
(Italy) A Grymalska | 2 | 6 | 6
(Italy) S Rubini | 1 | 5
WC | (Germany) A Gabric | 6 | 7
(Italy) G Gatto-Monticone | 1 | 2
6 | (Georgia (country)) E Gorgodze | 6 | 6
3 | (Switzerland) J Teichmann | 6 | 6
(Romania) A Cadanțu | 2 | 0
Q | (Russia) V Flink | 6 | 6
(Croatia) T Mrdeža | 1 | 2
Q | (Germany) J Niemeier | 4 | 2
(Chile) D Seguel | 6 | 6
(Slovakia) M Hončová | 2 | 3
8 | (Germany) A Zaja | 6 | 6

Second round
(Germany) K Hobgarski | 1 | 6 | 6
(Italy) A Grymalska | 6 | 3 | 1
WC | (Germany) A Gabric | 2 | 1
6 | (Georgia (country)) E Gorgodze | 6 | 6
3 | (Switzerland) J Teichmann | 1 | 6 | 2
Q | (Russia) V Flink | 6 | 2 | 6
(Chile) D Seguel | 4 | 2
8 | (Germany) A Zaja | 6 | 6

Quarterfinals
(Germany) K Hobgarski | 2 | 6 | 2
6 | (Georgia (country)) E Gorgodze | 6 | 2 | 6
Q | (Russia) V Flink | 3 | 6^{4}
8 | (Germany) A Zaja | 6 | 7^{7}

Semifinals
6 | (Georgia (country)) E Gorgodze | 7^{8} | 6
8 | (Germany) A Zaja | 6^{6} | 1

=== Bottom half ===
First round
5 | (Germany) L Siegemund | 4 | 6 | 6
Q | (Czech Republic) A Zarycká | 6 | 1 | 2
(Slovakia) R Šramková | 7 | 4 | 1
(United States) C Scholl | 5 | 6 | 6
WC | (Germany) L Rüffer | 7^{7} | 1 | 6
LL | (Greece) E Kordolaimi | 6^{5} | 6 | 3
(Russia) P Monova | 0 | 1
4 | (Netherlands) B Schoofs | 6 | 6
7 | (Serbia) D Radanović | 6^{6} | 5^{r}
(Croatia) T Lukas | 7^{8} | 6
(Austria) J Grabher | 6 | 6
WC | (Germany) A Lex | 4 | 3
Q | (Germany) T Korpatsch | 2 | 6 | 6
(Austria) B Haas | 6 | 1 | 3
(Czech Republic) T Martincová | 4 | 0
2 | (Germany) A Lottner | 6 | 6

Second round
5 | (Germany) L Siegemund | 6 | 6
(United States) C Scholl | 2 | 3
WC | (Germany) L Rüffer | 6 | 6
4 | (Netherlands) B Schoofs | 2 | 3
(Croatia) T Lukas | 0 | 0^{r}
(Austria) J Grabher | 6 | 3
Q | (Germany) T Korpatsch | 6 | 6
2 | (Germany) A Lottner | 4 | 0

Quarterfinals
5 | (Germany) L Siegemund | 6 | 6
WC | (Germany) L Rüffer | 4 | 2
(Austria) J Grabher | 3 | 3
Q | (Germany) T Korpatsch | 6 | 6

Semifinals
5 | (Germany) L Siegemund | 6 | 6
Q | (Germany) T Korpatsch | 3 | 4
