= 2024 Australian Open – Women's singles =

Tennis championship

Women's singles
- 2024 Australian Open

Final
- Champion: Aryna Sabalenka
- Runner-up: (China) Zheng Qinwen
- Score: 6–3, 6–2

Details
- Draw: 128
- Seeds: 32

Events
Singles	men	women		boys	girls
Doubles	men	women	mixed	boys	girls
WC Singles	men	women	quad	boys	girls
WC Doubles	men	women	quad	boys	girls

Qualification
Singles	men	women
- Australian Open

Defending champion Aryna Sabalenka defeated Zheng Qinwen in the final, 6–3, 6–2 to win the women's singles tennis title at the 2024 Australian Open. It was her second Australian Open title and second major singles title overall. Sabalenka did not lose a set during the tournament, and lost only 31 games in total. She was the first player to defend the title since Victoria Azarenka in 2013.

Dayana Yastremska was the first qualifier to reach the semifinals since Christine Matison in 1978, and the fifth qualifier in the Open Era to reach any major semifinal (after Matison, Alexandra Stevenson, Nadia Podoroska and Emma Raducanu). Zheng was the second Chinese woman to reach a major singles final, after Li Na, the second player in the Open Era to beat six unseeded players en route to the final (after Arantxa Sánchez Vicario in 1995), and the third player to do so at any major (after Sánchez Vicario and Martina Hingis at 1996 and 1997 Wimbledon, respectively, with the 16-seeds draw still in place). By reaching the final, Zheng made her debut in the top ten of the WTA rankings.

For the first time in the tournament's history, there were six former champions in the main draw: Sabalenka, Naomi Osaka, Sofia Kenin, Caroline Wozniacki, Angelique Kerber, and Azarenka. This marked the final Australian Open appearance for 2016 champion and former world No. 1 Kerber, who lost to Danielle Collins in the first round.

The defeat of world No. 1 Iga Świątek by Linda Nosková in the third round marked the earliest loss by a top seed at the Australian Open since 1979, and the first time that the top seed failed to make the round of 16 since the tournament became a 128-player draw in 1988. Nosková was the first teenager to defeat a current world No. 1 at a major since Petra Kvitová defeated Dinara Safina at the 2009 US Open. The five top-10 seeds to reach the third round were the fewest since 1988. Only seven seeded players reached the fourth round; this was the worst performance by seeded players since the draw was expanded to 128 players in 1988, and the worst overall since 1985.

Elena Rybakina and Anna Blinkova played the longest tiebreak in a major singles match in the third set of their second-round match. Blinkova won the tiebreak 22–20.

== Seeds ==
1. (Poland) Iga Świątek (third round)
2. Aryna Sabalenka (champion)
3. (Kazakhstan) Elena Rybakina (second round)
4. (United States) Coco Gauff (semifinals)
5. (United States) Jessica Pegula (second round)
6. (Tunisia) Ons Jabeur (second round)
7. (Czech Republic) Markéta Vondroušová (first round)
8. (Greece) Maria Sakkari (second round)
9. (Czech Republic) Barbora Krejčíková (quarterfinals)
10. (Brazil) Beatriz Haddad Maia (third round)
11. (Latvia) Jeļena Ostapenko (third round)
12. (China) Zheng Qinwen (final)
13. Liudmila Samsonova (first round)
14. Daria Kasatkina (second round)
15. Veronika Kudermetova (first round)
16. (France) Caroline Garcia (second round)
17. Ekaterina Alexandrova (first round)
18. Victoria Azarenka (fourth round)
19. (Ukraine) Elina Svitolina (fourth round, retired)
20. (Poland) Magda Linette (first round, retired)
21. (Croatia) Donna Vekić (first round)
22. (Romania) Sorana Cîrstea (first round)
23. Anastasia Potapova (first round)
24. (Ukraine) Anhelina Kalinina (first round)
25. (Belgium) Elise Mertens (second round)
26. (Italy) Jasmine Paolini (fourth round)
27. (United States) Emma Navarro (third round)
28. (Ukraine) Lesia Tsurenko (third round)
29. (China) Zhu Lin (first round)
30. (China) Wang Xinyu (first round)
31. (Czech Republic) Marie Bouzková (first round)
32. (Canada) Leylah Fernandez (second round)

Click on the seed number of a player to go to their draw section.

== Draw ==
Key

- Q = Qualifier
- WC = Wild card
- LL = Lucky loser
- Alt = Alternate
- ITF = ITF entry
- PR = Protected ranking
- SR = Special ranking
- SE = Special exempt
- JE = Junior exempt
- JR = Junior Accelerator Programme entrant
- CO = College Accelerator Programme entrant
- NG = Next Gen Accelerator Program entrant
- w/o = Walkover
- r = Retired
- d = Defaulted

=== Finals ===
Quarterfinals
(Czech Republic) Linda Nosková	3	4
Q	(Ukraine) Dayana Yastremska	6	6
Anna Kalinskaya	7^{7}	3	1
12	(China) Zheng Qinwen	6^{4}	6	6
(Ukraine) Marta Kostyuk	6^{6}	7^{7}	2
4	(United States) Coco Gauff	7^{8}	6^{3}	6
9	(Czech Republic) Barbora Krejčíková	2	3
2	Aryna Sabalenka	6	6

Semifinals
Q	(Ukraine) Dayana Yastremska	4	4
12	(China) Zheng Qinwen	6	6
4	(United States) Coco Gauff	6^{2}	4
2	Aryna Sabalenka	7^{7}	6

Final
12	(China) Zheng Qinwen	3	2
2	Aryna Sabalenka	6	6

=== Top half ===
==== Section 1 ====
First round
1	(Poland) I Świątek	7^{7}	6
(United States) S Kenin	6^{2}	2
(United States) D Collins	6	3	6
PR	(Germany) A Kerber	2	6	1
Q	(France) F Ferro	6	3	2
WC	(United States) M Kessler	3	6	6
(Czech Republic) L Nosková	6	7
31	(Czech Republic) M Bouzková	1	5
19	(Ukraine) E Svitolina	6	6
WC	(Australia) T Preston	2	2
(United States) K Day	4	2
(Bulgaria) V Tomova	6	6
(Romania) J Cristian	2	5
(Czech Republic) K Siniaková	6	7
(Switzerland) V Golubic	7^{7}	1	6
15	V Kudermetova	6^{4}	6	1

Second round
1	(Poland) I Świątek	6	3	6
(United States) D Collins	4	6	4
WC	(United States) M Kessler	3	6	4
(Czech Republic) L Nosková	6	1	6
19	(Ukraine) E Svitolina	6	6
(Bulgaria) V Tomova	1	3
(Czech Republic) K Siniaková	3	6	4
(Switzerland) V Golubic	6	2	6

Third round
1	(Poland) I Świątek	6	3	4
(Czech Republic) L Nosková	3	6	6
19	(Ukraine) E Svitolina	6	6
(Switzerland) V Golubic	2	3

Fourth round
(Czech Republic) L Nosková	3
19	(Ukraine) E Svitolina	0^{r}

==== Section 2 ====
First round
11	(Latvia) J Ostapenko	7^{7}	6
WC	(Australia) K Birrell	6^{5}	1
(Croatia) P Martić	6^{3}	6	4
PR	(Australia) A Tomljanović	7^{7}	4	6
(Belgium) G Minnen	5	5
(Denmark) C Tauson	7	7
(Italy) C Giorgi	1	6	3
18	V Azarenka	6	4	6
27	(United States) E Navarro	6	6^{5}	7
(China) Xiy Wang	1	7^{7}	5
(Italy) E Cocciaretto	6	7
Q	(Switzerland) L Sun	1	5
(Belgium) Y Wickmayer	3	4
(France) V Gracheva	6	6
Q	(Ukraine) D Yastremska	6	6
7	(Czech Republic) M Vondroušová	1	2

Second round
11	(Latvia) J Ostapenko	6	3	6
PR	(Australia) A Tomljanović	0	6	4
(Denmark) C Tauson	4	6	2
18	V Azarenka	6	3	6
27	(United States) E Navarro	4	6	6
(Italy) E Cocciaretto	6	3	3
(France) V Gracheva	3	2
Q	(Ukraine) D Yastremska	6	6

Third round
11	(Latvia) J Ostapenko	1	5
18	V Azarenka	6	7
27	(United States) E Navarro	2	6	1
Q	(Ukraine) D Yastremska	6	2	6

Fourth round
18	V Azarenka	6^{6}	4
Q	(Ukraine) D Yastremska	7^{8}	6

==== Section 3 ====
First round
3	(Kazakhstan) E Rybakina	7^{8}	6
(Czech Republic) Ka Plíšková	6^{6}	4
(Spain) C Bucșa	2	4
A Blinkova	6	6
(Germany) T Maria	7	6^{4}	6
(Colombia) C Osorio	5	7^{7}	4
D Shnaider	3	4
26	(Italy) J Paolini	6	6
24	(Ukraine) A Kalinina	1	0
(Netherlands) A Rus	6	6
A Kalinskaya	6	3	6
Q	(United States) K Volynets	3	6	2
(United States) S Stephens	6	6
WC	(Australia) O Gadecki	3	1
(United States) P Stearns	2	6	2
14	D Kasatkina	6	3	6

Second round
3	(Kazakhstan) E Rybakina	4	6	6^{20}
A Blinkova	6	4	7^{22}
(Germany) T Maria	2	3
26	(Italy) J Paolini	6	6
(Netherlands) A Rus	1	5
A Kalinskaya	6	7
(United States) S Stephens	4	6	6
14	D Kasatkina	6	3	3

Third round
A Blinkova	6^{1}	4
26	(Italy) J Paolini	7^{7}	6
A Kalinskaya	6^{8}	6	6
(United States) S Stephens	7^{10}	1	4

Fourth round
26	(Italy) J Paolini	4	2
A Kalinskaya	6	6

==== Section 4 ====
First round
12	(China) Q Zheng	3	6	6
(United States) A Krueger	6	2	3
(United Kingdom) K Boulter	7	7^{7}
(China) Y Yuan	5	6^{1}
PR	(United Kingdom) E Raducanu	6	6
PR	(United States) S Rogers	3	2
(China) Y Wang	0	7	6
22	(Romania) S Cîrstea	6	5	2
29	(China) L Zhu	4	3
(France) O Dodin	6	6
Q	(Mexico) R Zarazúa	6	4	2
(Italy) M Trevisan	4	6	6
PR	(Serbia) A Krunić	4	1
(France) C Burel	6	6
Q	(Canada) R Marino	2	4
5	(United States) J Pegula	6	6

Second round
12	(China) Q Zheng	6	6
(United Kingdom) K Boulter	3	3
PR	(United Kingdom) E Raducanu	4	6	4
(China) Y Wang	6	4	6
(France) O Dodin	6	6
(Italy) M Trevisan	4	4
(France) C Burel	6	6
5	(United States) J Pegula	4	2

Third round
12	(China) Q Zheng	6	2	7^{10}
(China) Y Wang	4	6	6^{8}
(France) O Dodin	6	6
(France) C Burel	2	4

Fourth round
12	(China) Q Zheng	6	6
(France) O Dodin	0	3

=== Bottom half ===
==== Section 5 ====
First round
8	(Greece) M Sakkari	6	6
(Japan) N Hibino	4	1
(China) Z Bai	6	5	2
E Avanesyan	4	7	6
(Ukraine) M Kostyuk	6	4	6
(United States) C Liu	3	6	1
(Egypt) M Sherif	2	0^{r}
25	(Belgium) E Mertens	6	2
20	(Poland) M Linette	2	0^{r}
WC	(Denmark) C Wozniacki	6	2
WC	(France) A Cornet	2	4
Q	M Timofeeva	6	6
(Spain) S Sorribes Tormo	6	3	2
Q	A Korneeva	4	6	6
(Czech Republic) L Fruhvirtová	2	6	2
10	(Brazil) B Haddad Maia	6	3	6

Second round
8	(Greece) M Sakkari	4	4
E Avanesyan	6	6
(Ukraine) M Kostyuk	5	6	7^{10}
25	(Belgium) E Mertens	7	1	6^{6}
WC	(Denmark) C Wozniacki	6	4	1
Q	M Timofeeva	1	6	6
Q	A Korneeva	1	2
10	(Brazil) B Haddad Maia	6	6

Third round
E Avanesyan	6	4	4
(Ukraine) M Kostyuk	2	6	6
Q	M Timofeeva	7^{9}	6
10	(Brazil) B Haddad Maia	6^{7}	3

Fourth round
(Ukraine) M Kostyuk	6	6
Q	M Timofeeva	2	1

==== Section 6 ====
First round
16	(France) C Garcia	6	7^{7}
PR	(Japan) N Osaka	4	6^{2}
(Poland) M Fręch	6^{5}	6	7
WC	(Australia) D Saville	7^{7}	3	5
(Kazakhstan) Y Putintseva	6	0	3
Q	A Zakharova	2	6	6
(Slovenia) K Juvan	6	6
23	A Potapova	1	4
32	(Canada) L Fernandez	7^{7}	6
Q	(Czech Republic) S Bejlek	6^{5}	2
(United States) A Parks	2	6	6
Q	(Ukraine) D Snigur	6	2	4
(United States) C Dolehide	6	6
Q	(France) L Jeanjean	2	4
(Slovakia) AK Schmiedlová	3	0
4	(United States) C Gauff	6	6

Second round
16	(France) C Garcia	4	6^{2}
(Poland) M Fręch	6	7^{7}
Q	A Zakharova	6	6
(Slovenia) K Juvan	1	1
32	(Canada) L Fernandez	5	4
(United States) A Parks	7	6
(United States) C Dolehide	6^{2}	2
4	(United States) C Gauff	7^{7}	6

Third round
(Poland) M Fręch	4	7	6
Q	A Zakharova	6	5	4
(United States) A Parks	0	2
4	(United States) C Gauff	6	6

Fourth round
(Poland) M Fręch	1	2
4	(United States) C Gauff	6	6

==== Section 7 ====
First round
6	(Tunisia) O Jabeur	6	6
Q	(Ukraine) Y Starodubtseva	3	1
M Andreeva	7	6
(United States) B Pera	5	2
K Rakhimova	6	6
(United States) E Bektas	4	4
(France) D Parry	6	2	6
30	(China) Xin Wang	3	6	3
17	E Alexandrova	2	6	6^{9}
(Germany) L Siegemund	6	3	7^{11}
Q	(Australia) S Hunter	6	6
(Italy) S Errani	4	3
(Germany) T Korpatsch	2	6	6
(United Kingdom) J Burrage	6	3	0
WC	(Japan) M Hontama	6	4	3
9	(Czech Republic) B Krejčíková	2	6	6

Second round
6	(Tunisia) O Jabeur	0	2
M Andreeva	6	6
K Rakhimova	5	2
(France) D Parry	7	6
(Germany) L Siegemund	4	6	3
Q	(Australia) S Hunter	6	3	6
(Germany) T Korpatsch	2	2
9	(Czech Republic) B Krejčíková	6	6

Third round
M Andreeva	1	6	7^{10}
(France) D Parry	6	1	6^{5}
Q	(Australia) S Hunter	6	5	3
9	(Czech Republic) B Krejčíková	4	7	6

Fourth round
M Andreeva	6	3	2
9	(Czech Republic) B Krejčíková	4	6	6

==== Section 8 ====
First round
13	L Samsonova	3	4
PR	(United States) A Anisimova	6	6
(Argentina) N Podoroska	6	6
(Slovenia) T Zidanšek	1	0
(United States) T Townsend	1	3
(Spain) P Badosa	6	6
A Pavlyuchenkova	6	6
21	(Croatia) D Vekić	4	4
28	(Ukraine) L Tsurenko	3	7	6
(Italy) L Bronzetti	6	5	3
(Spain) R Masarova	6	6
A Sasnovich	3	4
(Romania) A Bogdan	6	4	3
Q	(Czech Republic) B Fruhvirtová	2	6	6
Q	(Germany) E Seidel	0	1
2	A Sabalenka	6	6

Second round
PR	(United States) A Anisimova	6	6
(Argentina) N Podoroska	2	3
(Spain) P Badosa	6	6
A Pavlyuchenkova	2	3
28	(Ukraine) L Tsurenko	6	6
(Spain) R Masarova	3	4
Q	(Czech Republic) B Fruhvirtová	3	2
2	A Sabalenka	6	6

Third round
PR	(United States) A Anisimova	7	6
(Spain) P Badosa	5	4
28	(Ukraine) L Tsurenko	0	0
2	A Sabalenka	6	6

Fourth round
PR	(United States) A Anisimova	3	2
2	A Sabalenka	6	6

== Championship match statistics ==
Category	Sabalenka	(China) Zheng
1st serve %	38/57 (67%)	27/51 (53%)
1st serve points won	32 of 38 = 84%	20 of 27 = 74%
2nd serve points won	8 of 19 = 42%	9 of 24 = 38%
Total service points won	40 of 57 = 70.16%	29 of 51 = 56.86%
Aces	3	6
Double faults	0	6
Winners	14	19
Unforced errors	14	16
Net points won	4 of 8 = 50%	3 of 3 = 100%
Break points converted	3 of 6 = 50%	0 of 4 = 0%
Return points won	22 of 51 = 43%	17 of 57 = 30%
Total points won	62	46

== Seeded players ==
The following are the seeded players. Seedings are based on WTA rankings as of 8 January 2024. Rankings and points before are as of 15 January 2024.

Seed	Rank	Player	Points before	Points defending	Points won	Points after	Status
1	1	(Poland) Iga Świątek	9,880	240	130	9,770	Third round lost to (Czech Republic) Linda Nosková
2	2	Aryna Sabalenka	8,905	2,000	2,000	8,905	Champion, defeated (China) Zheng Qinwen [12]
3	3	(Kazakhstan) Elena Rybakina	6,918	1,300	70	5,688	Second round lost to Anna Blinkova
4	4	(United States) Coco Gauff	6,660	240	780	7,200	Semifinals lost to Aryna Sabalenka [2]
5	5	(United States) Jessica Pegula	6,065	430	70	5,705	Second round lost to (France) Clara Burel
6	6	(Tunisia) Ons Jabeur	4,076	70	70	4,076	Second round lost to Mirra Andreeva
7	7	(Czech Republic) Markéta Vondroušová	3,966	130	10	3,846	First round lost to (Ukraine) Dayana Yastremska [Q]
8	8	(Greece) Maria Sakkari	3,770	130	70	3,710	Second round lost to Elina Avanesyan
9	11	(Czech Republic) Barbora Krejčíková	2,891	240	430	3,081	Quarterfinals lost to Aryna Sabalenka [2]
10	12	(Brazil) Beatriz Haddad Maia	2,830	10	130	2,950	Third round lost to Maria Timofeeva [Q]
11	10	(Latvia) Jeļena Ostapenko	3,328	430	130	3,028	Third round lost to Victoria Azarenka [18]
12	15	(China) Zheng Qinwen	2,720	70	1,300	3,950	Runner-up, lost to Aryna Sabalenka [2]
13	14	Liudmila Samsonova	2,760	70	10	2,700	First round lost to (United States) Amanda Anisimova [PR]
14	13	Daria Kasatkina	2,778	10	70	2,838	Second round lost to (United States) Sloane Stephens
15	17	Veronika Kudermetova	2,555	70	10	2,495	First round lost to (Switzerland) Viktorija Golubic
16	19	(France) Caroline Garcia	2,330	240	70	2,160	Second round lost to (Poland) Magdalena Fręch
17	20	Ekaterina Alexandrova	2,215	130	10	2,095	First round lost to (Germany) Laura Siegemund
18	22	Victoria Azarenka	2,011	780	240	1,471	Fourth round lost to (Ukraine) Dayana Yastremska [Q]
19	23	(Ukraine) Elina Svitolina	1,972	0	240	2,212	Fourth round retired against (Czech Republic) Linda Nosková
20	24	(Poland) Magda Linette	1,896	780	10	1,126	First round retired against (Denmark) Caroline Wozniacki [WC]
21	25	(Croatia) Donna Vekić	1,865	430	10	1,445	First round lost to Anastasia Pavlyuchenkova
22	27	(Romania) Sorana Cîrstea	1,722	10	10	1,722	First round lost to (China) Wang Yafan
23	29	Anastasia Potapova	1,694	70	10	1,634	First round lost to (Slovenia) Kaja Juvan
24	30	(Ukraine) Anhelina Kalinina	1,600	130	10	1,480	First round lost to (Netherlands) Arantxa Rus
25	28	(Belgium) Elise Mertens	1,713	130	70	1,653	Second round lost to (Ukraine) Marta Kostyuk
26	31	(Italy) Jasmine Paolini	1,530	10	240	1,760	Fourth round lost to Anna Kalinskaya
27	26	(United States) Emma Navarro	1,730	(57)^{†}	130	1,803	Third round lost to (Ukraine) Dayana Yastremska [Q]
28	33	(Ukraine) Lesia Tsurenko	1,452	40	130	1,542	Third round lost to Aryna Sabalenka [2]
29	32	(China) Zhu Lin	1,464	240	10	1,234	First round lost to (France) Océane Dodin
30	36	(China) Wang Xinyu	1,353	70	10	1,293	First round lost to (France) Diane Parry
31	34	(Czech Republic) Marie Bouzková	1,382	10	10	1,382	First round lost to (Czech Republic) Linda Nosková
32	35	(Canada) Leylah Fernandez	1,355	70	70	1,355	Second round lost to (United States) Alycia Parks

^{†} The player did not qualify for the main draw in 2023. Points from her 18th best result will be deducted instead.

=== Withdrawn players ===
The following players would have been seeded, but withdrew before the tournament began.

Rank	Player	Points before	Points defending	Points after	Withdrawal reason
9	(Czech Republic) Karolína Muchová	3,590	70	3,520	Wrist injury
16	(United States) Madison Keys	2,608	130	2,478	Shoulder injury
18	(Czech Republic) Petra Kvitová	2,535	70	2,465	Pregnancy
21	(Switzerland) Belinda Bencic	2,077	240	1,837	Pregnancy

== Other entry information ==
=== Wildcards ===
- (Australia) Kimberly Birrell
- (France) Alizé Cornet
- (Australia) Olivia Gadecki
- (Japan) Mai Hontama
- (United States) McCartney Kessler
- (Australia) Taylah Preston
- (Australia) Daria Saville
- (Denmark) Caroline Wozniacki

=== Protected ranking ===
- (Germany) Angelique Kerber (31)
- (Australia) Ajla Tomljanović (33)
- (Japan) Naomi Osaka (46)
- (United States) Shelby Rogers (51)
- (United States) Amanda Anisimova (61)
- (Serbia) Aleksandra Krunić (99)
- (United Kingdom) Emma Raducanu (103)

=== Qualifiers ===
- (Czech Republic) Sára Bejlek
- (France) Fiona Ferro
- (Czech Republic) Brenda Fruhvirtová
- (Australia) Storm Hunter
- (France) Léolia Jeanjean
- Alina Korneeva
- (Canada) Rebecca Marino
- (Germany) Ella Seidel
- (Ukraine) Daria Snigur
- (Ukraine) Yuliia Starodubtseva
- (Switzerland) Lulu Sun
- Maria Timofeeva
- (United States) Katie Volynets
- (Ukraine) Dayana Yastremska
- Anastasia Zakharova
- (Mexico) Renata Zarazúa

=== Withdrawals ===
The entry list was released by Tennis Australia based on the WTA rankings for the week of 4 December 2023.

- † (Switzerland) Belinda Bencic (17) → replaced by (United Kingdom) Jodie Burrage (98)
- † (Canada) Bianca Andreescu (96) → replaced by (United States) Claire Liu (99)
- ‡ (Romania) Irina-Camelia Begu (75) → replaced by (Serbia) Aleksandra Krunić (99 SR)
- ‡ (United States) Caty McNally (71 SR) → replaced by Kamilla Rakhimova (100)
- ‡ (Czech Republic) Karolína Muchová (8) → replaced by (China) Wang Yafan (101)
- ‡ (Czech Republic) Petra Kvitová (14) → replaced by (Slovenia) Tamara Zidanšek (103)
- ‡ (United States) Lauren Davis (70) → replaced by (United Kingdom) Emma Raducanu (103 SR)
- ‡ (United States) Madison Keys (12) → replaced by (Italy) Sara Errani (104)
- ‡ (United States) Jennifer Brady (14 SR) → replaced by (Slovenia) Kaja Juvan (105)

† – not included on entry list
‡ – withdrew from entry list

Preceded by 2023 US Open – Women's singles	Grand Slam women's singles	Succeeded by 2024 French Open – Women's singles
