= 2023 Ladies Open Hechingen – Doubles =

Doubles
- 2023 Ladies Open Hechingen

Final
- Champions: Alena Fomina-Klotz (North Macedonia) Lina Gjorcheska
- Runners-up: (Georgia (country)) Ekaterine Gorgodze (Germany) Katharina Hobgarski
- Score: 6–2, 6–4

Events
Singles	Doubles
← 2022 ·	Ladies Open Hechingen	· 2024 →

Irina Khromacheva and Diana Shnaider were the defending champions but chose not to participate.

Alena Fomina-Klotz and Lina Gjorcheska won the title, defeating Ekaterine Gorgodze and Katharina Hobgarski in the final, 6–2, 6–4.

== Seeds ==
1. (Belgium) Sofia Costoulas / Sofya Lansere (first round)
2. (Romania) Cristina Dinu / (Australia) Priscilla Hon (first round)
3. Alena Fomina-Klotz / (North Macedonia) Lina Gjorcheska (champions)
4. Ekaterina Ovcharenko / (Greece) Sapfo Sakellaridi (quarterfinals)

== Draw ==
=== Key ===
- Q = Qualifier
- WC = Wild card
- LL = Lucky loser
- Alt = Alternate
- SE = Special exempt
- PR = Protected ranking
- ITF = ITF entry
- JE = Junior exempt
- w/o = Walkover
- r = Retired
- d = Defaulted
- SR = Special ranking

=== Draw ===
First round
1	(Belgium) S Costoulas; S Lansere	3	7	[8]
(Czech Republic) K Kubáňová (Czech Republic) A Kučmová	6	5	[10]
(Germany) C Kuhl (Germany) E Seidel	6	6
WC	(Germany) G Fedel (Germany) A Maier	0	2
3	A Fomina-Klotz (North Macedonia) L Gjorcheska	6	6
(Croatia) M Dražić (Bosnia and Herzegovina) A Wagner	3	3
(Serbia) T Čurović (Estonia) E Malõgina	6^{3}	3
(Czech Republic) M Bayerlová; A Zolotareva	7^{7}	6
(Georgia (country)) E Gorgodze (Germany) K Hobgarski	6	6
(Slovenia) N Potočnik (Bulgaria) G Topalova	1	3
WC	(Germany) V Pohle (Germany) M Vogt	2	2
4	E Ovcharenko (Greece) S Sakellaridi	6	6
WC	(Germany) D Maier (Germany) L Schondelmaier	0	0
(Germany) E Seibold (Romania) AG Vasilescu	6	6
(Japan) R Saigo (Japan) Y Saigo	6	6
2	(Romania) C Dinu (Australia) P Hon	3	2

Quarterfinals
(Czech Republic) K Kubáňová (Czech Republic) A Kučmová	4	6	[8]
(Germany) C Kuhl (Germany) E Seidel	6	2	[10]
3	A Fomina-Klotz (North Macedonia) L Gjorcheska	6	6
(Czech Republic) M Bayerlová; A Zolotareva	2	3
(Georgia (country)) E Gorgodze (Germany) K Hobgarski	6	6
4	E Ovcharenko (Greece) S Sakellaridi	4	3
(Germany) E Seibold (Romania) AG Vasilescu	2	4
(Japan) R Saigo (Japan) Y Saigo	6	6

Semifinals
(Germany) C Kuhl (Germany) E Seidel	6	2	[11]
3	A Fomina-Klotz (North Macedonia) L Gjorcheska	2	6	[13]
(Georgia (country)) E Gorgodze (Germany) K Hobgarski	6	6
(Japan) R Saigo (Japan) Y Saigo	1	1

Final
3	A Fomina-Klotz (North Macedonia) L Gjorcheska	6	6
(Georgia (country)) E Gorgodze (Germany) K Hobgarski	2	4
