= 2023 Ladies Open Hechingen – Singles =

Singles
- 2023 Ladies Open Hechingen

Final
- Champion: (Czech Republic) Brenda Fruhvirtová
- Runner-up: (Slovenia) Živa Falkner
- Score: 6–3, 6–1

Events
Singles	Doubles
← 2022 ·	Ladies Open Hechingen	· 2024 →

Lea Bošković was the defending champion but chose not to participate.

Brenda Fruhvirtová won the title, defeating Živa Falkner in the final, 6–3, 6–1.

== Seeds ==
1. (Czech Republic) Brenda Fruhvirtová (champion)
2. (Spain) Jéssica Bouzas Maneiro (semifinals)
3. (Hungary) Anna Bondár (semifinals)
4. (Argentina) María Lourdes Carlé (first round)
5. (Australia) Priscilla Hon (first round)
6. (Belgium) Marie Benoît (first round)
7. (North Macedonia) Lina Gjorcheska (second round)
8. (Slovenia) Dalila Jakupović (first round, retired)

== Draw ==
=== Key ===
- Q = Qualifier
- WC = Wild card
- LL = Lucky loser
- Alt = Alternate
- SE = Special exempt
- PR = Protected ranking
- ITF = ITF entry
- JE = Junior exempt
- w/o = Walkover
- r = Retired
- d = Defaulted
- SR = Special ranking

=== Finals ===
Semifinals
1	(Czech Republic) Brenda Fruhvirtová	7^{7}	6
3	(Hungary) Anna Bondár	6^{2}	3
Q	(Slovenia) Živa Falkner	2	6	7
2	(Spain) Jéssica Bouzas Maneiro	6	3	5

Final
1	(Czech Republic) Brenda Fruhvirtová	6	6
Q	(Slovenia) Živa Falkner	3	1

=== Top half ===
First round
1	(Czech Republic) B Fruhvirtová	6	6
(Germany) K Hobgarski	1	1
(Belgium) S Costoulas	6	6
(Germany) S Wagner	2	3
A Zolotareva	1	4
Q	(Italy) S Ambrosio	6	6
Q	S Lansere	6	6
6	(Belgium) M Benoît	3	4
3	(Hungary) A Bondár	6	6
(Czech Republic) M Bayerlová	1	0
WC	(Germany) E Seidel	4	6	1
(Slovenia) N Potočnik	6	2	6
(Romania) C Dinu	1	5
WC	(Germany) A Vecic	6	7
Q	(Bulgaria) D Glushkova	6	6
5	(Australia) P Hon	4	1

Second round
1	(Czech Republic) B Fruhvirtová	6	6
(Belgium) S Costoulas	3	2
Q	(Italy) S Ambrosio	6^{3}	2
Q	S Lansere	7^{7}	6
3	(Hungary) A Bondár	4	6	7
(Slovenia) N Potočnik	6	3	5
WC	(Germany) A Vecic	6	6
Q	(Bulgaria) D Glushkova	3	3

Quarterfinals
1	(Czech Republic) B Fruhvirtová	6	6
Q	S Lansere	4	3
3	(Hungary) A Bondár	6	6
WC	(Germany) A Vecic	3	3

Semifinals
1	(Czech Republic) B Fruhvirtová	7^{7}	6
3	(Hungary) A Bondár	6^{2}	3

=== Bottom half ===
First round
7	(North Macedonia) L Gjorcheska	4	6	6
(Croatia) T Lukas	6	3	2
(Bulgaria) G Topalova	2	1
Q	(Slovenia) Ž Falkner	6	6
(Greece) S Sakellaridi	7^{7}	4
(Georgia (country)) E Gorgodze	6^{2}	0^{r}
Q	(Czech Republic) A Kučmová	7^{7}	6
4	(Argentina) ML Carlé	6^{3}	2
8	(Slovenia) D Jakupović	6^{1}	0^{r}
Q	(Germany) J Middendorf	7^{7}	4
WC	(Germany) C Kuhl	3	7	7
(Estonia) E Malõgina	6	5	5
Q	(Japan) N Hanatani	6	4	6
WC	(Germany) E Seibold	2	6	4
Q	E Laskevich	4	3
2	(Spain) J Bouzas Maneiro	6	6

Second round
7	(North Macedonia) L Gjorcheska	6	3	4
Q	(Slovenia) Ž Falkner	4	6	6
(Greece) S Sakellaridi	6	6
Q	(Czech Republic) A Kučmová	3	4
Q	(Germany) J Middendorf	3	6	6
WC	(Germany) C Kuhl	6	1	4
Q	(Japan) N Hanatani	0	2
2	(Spain) J Bouzas Maneiro	6	6

Quarterfinals
Q	(Slovenia) Ž Falkner	6	6
(Greece) S Sakellaridi	2	3
Q	(Germany) J Middendorf	4	1
2	(Spain) J Bouzas Maneiro	6	6

Semifinals
Q	(Slovenia) Ž Falkner	2	6	7
2	(Spain) J Bouzas Maneiro	6	3	5
