= 2017 Ladies Open Hechingen – Doubles =

Doubles
- 2017 Ladies Open Hechingen

Final
- Champion: (Italy) Camilla Rosatello (Georgia (country)) Sofia Shapatava
- Runner-up: (Germany) Romy Kölzer (Germany) Lena Rüffer
- Score: 6–2, 6–4

Events
Singles	Doubles
← 2016 ·	Ladies Open Hechingen	· 2018 →

Nicola Geuer and Anna Zaja were the defending champions, but Zaja chose not to participate. Geuer partnered Eva Wacanno, but they lost in the first round to Amina Anshba and Alina Silich.

Camilla Rosatello and Sofia Shapatava won the title, defeating Romy Kölzer and Lena Rüffer in the final, 6–2, 6–4.

== Seeds ==
1. (Belarus) Lidziya Marozava / (Turkey) İpek Soylu (first round, withdrew)
2. (Germany) Nicola Geuer / (Netherlands) Eva Wacanno (first round)
3. (Romania) Alexandra Cadanțu / (Russia) Anna Kalinskaya (quarterfinals, withdrew)
4. (Croatia) Tereza Mrdeža / (Slovakia) Chantal Škamlová (first round)

== Draw ==
=== Key ===
- Q = Qualifier
- WC = Wild card
- LL = Lucky loser
- Alt = Alternate
- SE = Special exempt
- PR = Protected ranking
- ITF = ITF entry
- JE = Junior exempt
- w/o = Walkover
- r = Retired
- d = Defaulted
- SR = Special ranking

First round
1	(Belarus) L Marozava (Turkey) İ Soylu
(Romania) N Dascălu (Romania) C Dinu	w/o
(Bosnia and Herzegovina) A Husarić (United States) C Scholl	7^{7}	6
(Czech Republic) J Malečková (Russia) Ana Pribylova	6^{4}	4
4	(Croatia) T Mrdeža (Slovakia) C Škamlová	2	6	[9]
(Italy) C Rosatello (Georgia (country)) S Shapatava	6	3	[11]
(Ukraine) A Fomina (Poland) M Fręch	6	6
(Russia) K Bekker (Hungary) P Udvardy	3	1
(Bulgaria) I Shinikova (Mexico) R Zarazúa	2	7	[6]
(Germany) R Kölzer (Germany) L Rüffer	6	5	[10]
(Uzbekistan) A Amanmuradova (Russia) V Ivakhnenko	2	6	[8]
3	(Romania) A Cadanțu (Russia) A Kalinskaya	6	0	[10]
WC	(Ukraine) A Fedoryshyn (Romania) AG Vasilescu	0	4
(Germany) V Heisen (Brazil) L Stefani	6	6
(Russia) A Anshba (Russia) A Silich	7^{7}	6
2	(Germany) N Geuer (Netherlands) E Wacanno	6^{4}	4

Quarterfinals
(Romania) N Dascălu (Romania) C Dinu	6	4	[10]
(Bosnia and Herzegovina) A Husarić (United States) C Scholl	4	6	[7]
(Italy) C Rosatello (Georgia (country)) S Shapatava	7	6
(Ukraine) A Fomina (Poland) M Fręch	5	3
(Germany) R Kölzer (Germany) L Rüffer	w/o
3	(Romania) A Cadanțu (Russia) A Kalinskaya
(Germany) V Heisen (Brazil) L Stefani	4	0
(Russia) A Anshba (Russia) A Silich	6	6

Semifinals
(Romania) N Dascălu (Romania) C Dinu	3	6	[12]
(Italy) C Rosatello (Georgia (country)) S Shapatava	6	4	[14]
(Germany) R Kölzer (Germany) L Rüffer	6	6
(Russia) A Anshba (Russia) A Silich	2	1

Final
(Italy) C Rosatello (Georgia (country)) S Shapatava	6	6
(Germany) R Kölzer (Germany) L Rüffer	2	4
