= 2022 Ladies Open Hechingen – Singles =

Singles
- 2022 Ladies Open Hechingen

Final
- Champion: (Croatia) Lea Bošković
- Runner-up: (Germany) Noma Noha Akugue
- Score: 7–5, 3–6, 6–4

Events
Singles	Doubles
← 2019 ·	Ladies Open Hechingen	· 2023 →

Barbara Haas was the defending champion but chose not to participate.

Lea Bošković won the title, defeating Noma Noha Akugue in the final, 7–5, 3–6, 6–4.

== Seeds ==
1. (Australia) Jaimee Fourlis (second round)
2. (Austria) Sinja Kraus (quarterfinals)
3. (Switzerland) Stefanie Vögele (first round)
4. (Czech Republic) Anna Sisková (first round)
5. Diana Shnaider (first round)
6. (United Kingdom) Sarah Beth Grey (first round, retired)
7. Irina Khromacheva (first round, retired)
8. Ekaterina Makarova (second round, retired)

== Draw ==
=== Key ===
- Q = Qualifier
- WC = Wild card
- LL = Lucky loser
- Alt = Alternate
- ITF = ITF entry
- PR = Protected ranking
- SR = Special ranking
- SE = Special exempt
- JE = Junior exempt
- JR = Junior Accelerator Programme entrant
- CO = College Accelerator Programme entrant
- NG = Next Gen Accelerator Program entrant
- w/o = Walkover
- r = Retired
- d = Defaulted

=== Finals ===
Semifinals
Q	(Greece) Sapfo Sakellaridi	2	5
(Croatia) Lea Bošković	6	7
(Czech Republic) Michaela Bayerlová	6	4	3
WC	(Germany) Noma Noha Akugue	4	6	6

Final
(Croatia) Lea Bošković	7	3	6
WC	(Germany) Noma Noha Akugue	5	6	4

=== Top half ===
First round
1	(Australia) J Fourlis	2	6	6
Q	(Germany) K Kanev	6	2	4
(Belgium) M Kempen	6^{4}	4
Q	(Bulgaria) J Terziyska	7^{7}	6
Q	(Greece) S Sakellaridi	6	6
WC	(Germany) E Seidel	3	3
WC	(Germany) Jo Steur	7	0
7	I Khromacheva	5	0^{r}
3	(Switzerland) S Vögele	3	7^{8}	6^{3}
(Estonia) E Malõgina	6	6^{6}	7^{7}
Q	(France) V Muntean	2	4
(Croatia) L Bošković	6	6
Q	(Germany) T Morderger	2	2
Q	(United States) V Wolff	6	6
(Slovenia) N Potočnik	6	4
6	(United Kingdom) SB Grey	1	0^{r}

Second round
1	(Australia) J Fourlis	5	1
Q	(Bulgaria) J Terziyska	7	6
Q	(Greece) S Sakellaridi	6	6
WC	(Germany) Jo Steur	3	2
(Estonia) E Malõgina	3	6	3
(Croatia) L Bošković	6	2	6
Q	(United States) V Wolff	6	6
(Slovenia) N Potočnik	3	3

Quarterfinals
Q	(Bulgaria) J Terziyska	5	2^{r}
Q	(Greece) S Sakellaridi	7	3
(Croatia) L Bošković	6	6
Q	(United States) V Wolff	0	4

Semifinals
Q	(Greece) S Sakellaridi	2	5
(Croatia) L Bošković	6	7

=== Bottom half ===
First round
8	E Makarova	6	7
(United States) E Halbauer	2	5
WC	(Germany) A Vecic	1	6	4
(Czech Republic) M Bayerlová	6	3	6
PR	(Italy) J Pieri	6	2	6
(Switzerland) A Rushiti	4	6	1
(Germany) M Barthel	6	5	6
4	(Czech Republic) A Sisková	1	7	4
5	D Shnaider	4	4
(Italy) S Rubini	6	6
WC	(Germany) N Noha Akugue	6	6
(Denmark) S Samavati	2	3
Q	(United States) C Scholl	6	6
(Kazakhstan) A Danilina	2	3
Q	(Germany) J Middendorf	4	0
2	(Austria) S Kraus	6	6

Second round
8	E Makarova	4	0^{r}
(Czech Republic) M Bayerlová	6	1
PR	(Italy) J Pieri	2	2
(Germany) M Barthel	6	6
(Italy) S Rubini	1	3
WC	(Germany) N Noha Akugue	6	6
Q	(United States) C Scholl	4	2
2	(Austria) S Kraus	6	6

Quarterfinals
(Czech Republic) M Bayerlová	6	6
(Germany) M Barthel	4	4
WC	(Germany) N Noha Akugue	5	6	6
2	(Austria) S Kraus	7	2	3

Semifinals
(Czech Republic) M Bayerlová	6	4	3
WC	(Germany) N Noha Akugue	4	6	6
