= 2022 Ladies Open Hechingen – Doubles =

Doubles
- 2022 Ladies Open Hechingen

Final
- Champions: Irina Khromacheva; Diana Shnaider
- Runners-up: (Serbia) Tamara Čurović (United States) Chiara Scholl
- Score: 6–2, 6–3

Events
Singles	Doubles
← 2019 ·	Ladies Open Hechingen	· 2023 →

Cristina Dinu and Lina Gjorcheska were the defending champions but chose not to participate.

Irina Khromacheva and Diana Shnaider won the title, defeating Tamara Čurović and Chiara Scholl in the final, 6–2, 6–3.

== Seeds ==
1. Alena Fomina-Klotz / (Czech Republic) Anna Sisková (quarterfinals)
2. (Germany) Tayisiya Morderger / (Germany) Yana Morderger (first round)
3. Irina Khromacheva / Diana Shnaider (champions)
4. (Serbia) Tamara Čurović / (United States) Chiara Scholl (final)

== Draw ==
=== Key ===
- Q = Qualifier
- WC = Wild card
- LL = Lucky loser
- Alt = Alternate
- ITF = ITF entry
- PR = Protected ranking
- SR = Special ranking
- SE = Special exempt
- JE = Junior exempt
- JR = Junior Accelerator Programme entrant
- CO = College Accelerator Programme entrant
- NG = Next Gen Accelerator Program entrant
- w/o = Walkover
- r = Retired
- d = Defaulted

=== Draw ===
First round
(Romania) O Gavrilă (United States) E Halbauer	6	6
E Makarova (Uzbekistan) M Maslenkova	2	0
3	I Khromacheva; D Shnaider	6	6
(Australia) A Parnaby (Slovakia) I Vojčináková	1	1
(Germany) N Noha Akugue (Germany) Jo Steur	7	6
(Germany) M Mack (Germany) A Vecic	5	2
(Germany) A Maier (Germany) I Vogelmann	2	0
(United States) S Broadus (Germany) E Seidel	6	6
(Uzbekistan) L Bekmetova (Germany) V Pohle	1	0
4	(Serbia) T Čurović (United States) C Scholl	6	6
(Czech Republic) M Bayerlová (Slovenia) N Potočnik	1	7	[10]
(Estonia) E Malõgina (Greece) S Sakellaridi	6	5	[8]
(France) V Muntean (Bulgaria) J Terziyska	7	6
2	(Germany) T Morderger (Germany) Y Morderger	5	4

Quarterfinals
1	A Fomina-Klotz (Czech Republic) A Sisková	7	5	[5]
(Romania) O Gavrilă (United States) E Halbauer	5	7	[10]
3	I Khromacheva; D Shnaider	7^{7}	6
(Germany) N Noha Akugue (Germany) Jo Steur	6^{5}	2
(United States) S Broadus (Germany) E Seidel	5	1
4	(Serbia) T Čurović (United States) C Scholl	7	6
(Czech Republic) M Bayerlová (Slovenia) N Potočnik	w/o
(France) V Muntean (Bulgaria) J Terziyska

Semifinals
(Romania) O Gavrilă (United States) E Halbauer	1	3
3	I Khromacheva; D Shnaider	6	6
4	(Serbia) T Čurović (United States) C Scholl	6	6
(Czech Republic) M Bayerlová (Slovenia) N Potočnik	1	2

Final
3	I Khromacheva; D Shnaider	6	6
4	(Serbia) T Čurović (United States) C Scholl	2	3
