= 2019 Ladies Open Hechingen – Singles =

Singles
- 2019 Ladies Open Hechingen

Final
- Champion: (Austria) Barbara Haas
- Runner-up: (Serbia) Olga Danilović
- Score: 6–2, 6–1

Events
Singles	Doubles
← 2018 ·	Ladies Open Hechingen	· 2022 →

Ekaterine Gorgodze was the defending champion, but chose to participate in Warsaw instead.

Barbara Haas won the title, defeating Olga Danilović in the final, 6–2, 6–1.

== Seeds ==
1. (Germany) Tamara Korpatsch (quarterfinals)
2. (Slovenia) Dalila Jakupović (first round)
3. (Netherlands) Bibiane Schoofs (second round)
4. (Austria) Barbara Haas (champion)
5. (Germany) Katharina Hobgarski (first round)
6. (Romania) Alexandra Cadanțu (first round)
7. (Spain) Georgina García Pérez (quarterfinals)
8. (Austria) Julia Grabher (first round)

== Draw ==
=== Key ===
- Q = Qualifier
- WC = Wild card
- LL = Lucky loser
- Alt = Alternate
- SE = Special exempt
- PR = Protected ranking
- ITF = ITF entry
- JE = Junior exempt
- w/o = Walkover
- r = Retired
- d = Defaulted
- SR = Special ranking

=== Finals ===
Semifinals
(Serbia) Olga Danilović	6	6
(Russia) Marina Melnikova	1	3
4	(Austria) Barbara Haas	4	7^{7}	6
(Croatia) Lea Bošković	6	6^{3}	3

Final
(Serbia) Olga Danilović	2	1
4	(Austria) Barbara Haas	6	6

=== Top half ===
First round
1	(Germany) T Korpatsch	6	7
(Germany) S Wagner	3	5
WC	(Germany) C Schultheiss	4	0^{r}
Q	(Latvia) K Bartone	6	4
(Serbia) O Danilović	6	6
(North Macedonia) L Gjorcheska	2	3
(Czech Republic) J Malečková	4	6	6
6	(Romania) A Cadanțu	6	3	1
3	(Netherlands) B Schoofs	6	7
(Romania) I Fetecău	4	5
(Russia) M Melnikova	6	6
Q	(Czech Republic) M Bayerlová	1	2
(Russia) Y Sizikova	6	4	6
Q	(Germany) A Gabric	0	6	2
(Romania) LI Paar	6	6
5/WC	(Germany) K Hobgarski	3	1

Second round
1	(Germany) T Korpatsch	6	6
Q	(Latvia) K Bartone	3	4
(Serbia) O Danilović	6	6
(Czech Republic) J Malečková	3	4
3	(Netherlands) B Schoofs	6	4	3
(Russia) M Melnikova	3	6	6
(Russia) Y Sizikova	3	2
(Romania) LI Paar	6	6

Quarterfinals
1	(Germany) T Korpatsch	1	3
(Serbia) O Danilović	6	6
(Russia) M Melnikova	2	6	6
(Romania) LI Paar	6	3	2

Semifinals
(Serbia) O Danilović	6	6
(Russia) M Melnikova	1	3

=== Bottom half ===
First round
8	(Austria) J Grabher	3	1
(Germany) K Gerlach	6	6
(Georgia (country)) S Shapatava	1	4
WC	(Germany) L Schaeder	6	6
(Germany) J Niemeier	6	6
(Germany) C Werner	4	2
WC	(Germany) A Vecic	3	4
4	(Austria) B Haas	6	6
7	(Spain) G García Pérez	6	6
Q	(Greece) E Kordolaimi	4	3
Q	(Brazil) T Pereira	5	0
Q	(Norway) M Stokke	7	6
Q	(Germany) J Wachaczyk	2	3
Q	(Germany) T Morderger	6	6
(Croatia) L Bošković	7	6
2	(Slovenia) D Jakupović	5	3

Second round
(Germany) K Gerlach	6	4	4
WC	(Germany) L Schaeder	0	6	6
(Germany) J Niemeier	1	3
4	(Austria) B Haas	6	6
7	(Spain) G García Pérez	7	6
Q	(Norway) M Stokke	5	2
Q	(Germany) T Morderger	1	6^{1}
(Croatia) L Bošković	6	7^{7}

Quarterfinals
WC	(Germany) L Schaeder	2	1
4	(Austria) B Haas	6	6
7	(Spain) G García Pérez	4	6^{1}
(Croatia) L Bošković	6	7^{7}

Semifinals
4	(Austria) B Haas	4	7^{7}	6
(Croatia) L Bošković	6	6^{3}	3
