= 2024 Ladies Open Hechingen – Doubles =

Doubles
- 2024 Ladies Open Hechingen

Final
- Champions: (Czech Republic) Michaela Bayerlová (Georgia (country)) Sofia Shapatava
- Runners-up: (Germany) Anna Gabric (Germany) Mia Mack
- Score: 6–2, 5–7, [10–6]

Events
Singles	Doubles
← 2023 ·	Ladies Open Hechingen	· 2025 →

Alena Fomina-Klotz and Lina Gjorcheska were the defending champions but chose not to participate.

Michaela Bayerlová and Sofia Shapatava won the title, defeating Anna Gabric and Mia Mack in the final, 6–2, 5–7, [10–6].

== Seeds ==
1. (France) Elixane Lechemia / (Lithuania) Justina Mikulskytė (semifinals)
2. (United Kingdom) Emily Appleton / (United Kingdom) Samantha Murray Sharan (first round)
3. (Georgia (country)) Ekaterine Gorgodze / (Slovenia) Dalila Jakupović (quarterfinals)
4. (Netherlands) Isabelle Haverlag / (Latvia) Darja Semeņistaja (quarterfinals)

== Draw ==
=== Key ===
- Q = Qualifier
- WC = Wild card
- LL = Lucky loser
- Alt = Alternate
- SE = Special exempt
- PR = Protected ranking
- ITF = ITF entry
- JE = Junior exempt
- w/o = Walkover
- r = Retired
- d = Defaulted
- SR = Special ranking

First round
1	(France) E Lechemia (Lithuania) J Mikulskytė	7^{8}	4	[10]
(Czech Republic) J Štruplová (Turkey) İ Yörük	6^{6}	6	[6]
A Charaeva; E Pridankina	6	6^{4}	[9]
(Croatia) M Dražić; A Ibragimova	4	7^{7}	[11]
3	(Georgia (country)) E Gorgodze (Slovenia) D Jakupović	6	6
WC	(Germany) G Fedel (Germany) A Maier	1	3
WC	(Germany) E Seibold (Germany) M Vogt	4	7^{7}	[8]
WC	(Germany) A Gabric (Germany) M Mack	6	6^{4}	[10]
(Romania) E-T Cadar (Romania) AG Vasilescu	6	6
(United States) R McAdoo (Germany) N Noha Akugue	4	2
(South Korea) S-h Park (Greece) S Sakellaridi	7	1	[8]
4	(Netherlands) I Haverlag (Latvia) D Semeņistaja	5	6	[10]
(Australia) P Hule (Japan) E Sema	5	4
(Czech Republic) A Kučmová (Czech Republic) R Voráčová	7	6
(Czech Republic) M Bayerlová (Georgia (country)) S Shapatava	6	2	[12]
2	(United Kingdom) E Appleton (United Kingdom) S Murray Sharan	1	6	[10]

Quarterfinals
1	(France) E Lechemia (Lithuania) J Mikulskytė	6	4	[10]
(Croatia) M Dražić; A Ibragimova	1	6	[6]
3	(Georgia (country)) E Gorgodze (Slovenia) D Jakupović	6	3	[6]
WC	(Germany) A Gabric (Germany) M Mack	2	6	[10]
(Romania) E-T Cadar (Romania) AG Vasilescu	1	6	[10]
4	(Netherlands) I Haverlag (Latvia) D Semeņistaja	6	1	[8]
(Czech Republic) A Kučmová (Czech Republic) R Voráčová
(Czech Republic) M Bayerlová (Georgia (country)) S Shapatava	w/o

Semifinals
1	(France) E Lechemia (Lithuania) J Mikulskytė	4	6	[3]
WC	(Germany) A Gabric (Germany) M Mack	6	4	[10]
(Romania) E-T Cadar (Romania) AG Vasilescu	5	4
(Czech Republic) M Bayerlová (Georgia (country)) S Shapatava	7	6

Final
WC	(Germany) A Gabric (Germany) M Mack	2	7	[6]
(Czech Republic) M Bayerlová (Georgia (country)) S Shapatava	6	5	[10]
