= 2019 Ladies Open Hechingen – Doubles =

Doubles
- 2019 Ladies Open Hechingen

Final
- Champions: (Romania) Cristina Dinu (North Macedonia) Lina Gjorcheska
- Runners-up: (Serbia) Olga Danilović (Spain) Georgina García Pérez
- Score: 4–6, 7–5, [10–7]

Events
Singles	Doubles
← 2018 ·	Ladies Open Hechingen	· 2022 →

Polina Monova and Chantal Škamlová were the defending champions, but Monova chose not to participate. Škamlová played alongside Ágnes Bukta, but they lost in the first round to Katharina Gerlach and Julia Wachaczyk.

Cristina Dinu and Lina Gjorcheska won the title, defeating Olga Danilović and Georgina García Pérez in the final, 4–6, 7–5, [10–7].

== Seeds ==
1. (Slovenia) Dalila Jakupović / (Russia) Yana Sizikova (semifinals)
2. (Serbia) Olga Danilović / (Spain) Georgina García Pérez (final)
3. (Romania) Elena Bogdan / (Romania) Laura Ioana Paar (semifinals)
4. (Uzbekistan) Albina Khabibulina / (Georgia (country)) Sofia Shapatava (first round)

== Draw ==
=== Key ===
- Q = Qualifier
- WC = Wild card
- LL = Lucky loser
- Alt = Alternate
- SE = Special exempt
- PR = Protected ranking
- ITF = ITF entry
- JE = Junior exempt
- w/o = Walkover
- r = Retired
- d = Defaulted
- SR = Special ranking

=== Draw ===
First round
1	(Slovenia) D Jakupović (Russia) Y Sizikova	w/o
WC	(Germany) L Schaeder (Germany) E Seibold
(Russia) M Melnikova (Netherlands) E Wacanno	5	6	[8]
(Germany) T Morderger (Germany) Y Morderger	7	2	[10]
4	(Uzbekistan) A Khabibulina (Georgia (country)) S Shapatava	7	4	[6]
(Romania) I Fetecău (Switzerland) K Kennel	5	6	[10]
(Romania) C Dinu (North Macedonia) L Gjorcheska	6	6
WC	(Germany) M Mack (Germany) A Vecic	4	1
WC	(Germany) A Gabric (Germany) C Schultheiss	1	4
(Czech Republic) P Krejsová (Czech Republic) J Malečková	6	6
(Germany) A Klasen (Germany) R Kölzer	2	5
3	(Romania) E Bogdan (Romania) LI Paar	6	7
(Germany) K Gerlach (Germany) J Wachaczyk	6	6
(Hungary) Á Bukta (Slovakia) C Škamlová	3	1
(Germany) T Korpatsch (Switzerland) P Wuarin	1	2
2	(Serbia) O Danilović (Spain) G García Pérez	6	6

Quarterfinals
1	(Slovenia) D Jakupović (Russia) Y Sizikova	7	6
(Germany) T Morderger (Germany) Y Morderger	5	4
(Romania) I Fetecău (Switzerland) K Kennel	4	6	[8]
(Romania) C Dinu (North Macedonia) L Gjorcheska	6	2	[10]
(Czech Republic) P Krejsová (Czech Republic) J Malečková	5	4
3	(Romania) E Bogdan (Romania) LI Paar	7	6
(Germany) K Gerlach (Germany) J Wachaczyk	6	3	[7]
2	(Serbia) O Danilović (Spain) G García Pérez	4	6	[10]

Semifinals
1	(Slovenia) D Jakupović (Russia) Y Sizikova	6	4	[11]
(Romania) C Dinu (North Macedonia) L Gjorcheska	3	6	[13]
3	(Romania) E Bogdan (Romania) LI Paar	1	2
2	(Serbia) O Danilović (Spain) G García Pérez	6	6

Final
(Romania) C Dinu (North Macedonia) L Gjorcheska	4	7	[10]
2	(Serbia) O Danilović (Spain) G García Pérez	6	5	[7]
