= Brenda Fruhvirtová =

Czech tennis player (born 2007)

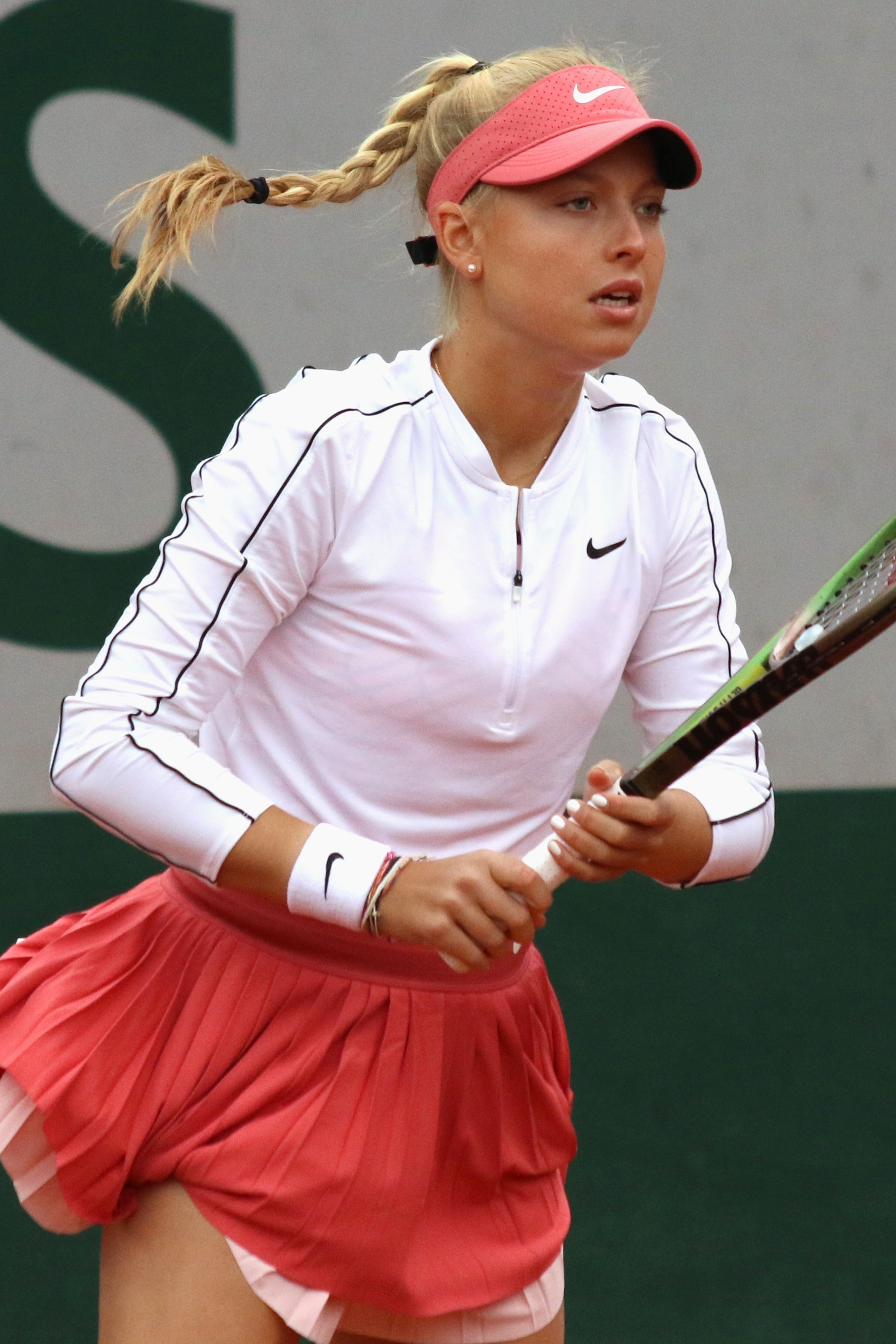
- Fruhvirtová at the 2023 French Open
- Country (sports): Czech Republic
- Born: 2 April 2007 (age 19) Prague, Czech Republic
- Plays: Right (two-handed backhand)
- Prize money: US$ 860,847

Singles
- Career record: 127–46
- Career titles: 15 ITF
- Highest ranking: No. 87 (29 July 2024)
- Current ranking: No. 1,303 (28 September 2026)

Grand Slam singles results
- Australian Open: 2R (2024)
- French Open: 1R (2023)
- Wimbledon: 2R (2024)
- US Open: 1R (2024)

Doubles
- Career record: 10–6
- Career titles: 1 ITF
- Highest ranking: No. 549 (30 January 2023)
- Current ranking: No. 1,585 (28 September 2026)
- Last updated on: 4 October 2026.

Brenda Fruhvirtová (born 2 April 2007) is a Czech professional tennis player. She has a career-high WTA singles ranking of No. 87, achieved on 29 July 2024.

Fruhvirtová reached a career-high ITF junior ranking of world No. 4, achieved on 13 December 2021.

== Early life and background ==
Born in Prague, the capital of the Czech Republic, Brenda Fruhvirtová is the younger sister of fellow professional tennis player, Linda.

The Fruhvirtová sisters have been training at the Mouratoglou Tennis Academy in Southern France since 2017, and are recipients of the Patrick Mouratoglou foundation.

== Career ==
=== Juniors ===
In 2018, Fruhvirtová won the U12 Eddie Herr tournament. She was ten years old when she won the title.

In April 2019, Brenda won the 2019 Trnava Cup U14 single title. In 2019, Brenda and her sister Linda won the Petits As doubles title together, with Linda also winning the singles title. One year later Brenda won the singles title in 2020, as a 12-year old, becoming the youngest winner in the tournament's 38-year history. The Fruhvirtová sisters became the first members of the same family to win the title two years in a row.

In July 2020, Fruhvirtová defeated world No. 54, Kateřina Siniaková, during an exhibition tournament in the Czech Republic. A few weeks later, Fruhvirtová was invited to participate in the Ultimate Tennis Showdown (UTS) at the Mouratoglou Academy. She was one of the four players to compete in the first women's edition UTS, and lost to Alizé Cornet. In September 2020, she received a wildcard by the French Tennis Federation to compete in the girls' singles draw at the French Open. She was the youngest player to feature in the event (13 years old).

=== 2021: Professional ===
Aged just 14, Fruhvirtová made her professional debut at the WTA 125 tournament in Seoul in December, where she defeated Jeong Moon in the first round, before losing to eighth seed Yuki Naito in her next match.

=== 2022: Eight ITF Circuit titles, top 200 & WTA Tour debut ===
At 14 years, 10 months and four days, Fruhvirtová became the youngest ITF Circuit champion, claiming her first title at the $25k Tucuman event in Argentina, since American Claire Liu, then 14 years, 9 months old, won a $10k event in Orlando in 2015. She won a second $25k title in Tucuman the following week. Fruhvirtová made her WTA Tour debut, after being awarded a wildcard into the Abierto Zapopan qualifying draw; she defeated former world No. 5, Sara Errani, and Leonie Küng to reach the main draw and make her WTA Tour debut, where she lost in straight sets to the sixth seed and former world No. 3, Sloane Stephens. In the six months following her 15th birthday, she won another six $25k tournaments at Klosters (Jun 26), Danderyd (Aug 14), Mogyorod (Aug 21), Braunschweig (Aug 28) and Santa Margherita di Pula (Sep 18 & Oct 23).

=== 2023–24: Major and top 100 debuts ===
Fruhvirtová qualified for her first major in her qualifying debut at the 2023 Australian Open. As the youngest player in the top 250, she became the fifth-youngest qualifier in Australian Open history and the youngest since Marta Kostyuk in 2018.

She received a wildcard for the main draw at the Miami Open. She also qualified for the 2023 French Open making her debut at this major.

In January 2024, Fruhvirtová again qualified for the Australian Open for a second consecutive year. She recorded her first win at a major defeating Ana Bogdan, and reached the top 100 in the rankings.

Having made it through qualifying, she defeated 24th seed Mirra Andreeva in the first round of Wimbledon for her first main-draw win at the grass-court major, before losing to Paula Badosa in her next match.

== Performance timelines ==
Key
W	F	SF	QF	#R	RR	Q#	P#	DNQ	A	Z#	PO	G	S	B	NMS	NTI	P	NH

(W) winner; (F) finalist; (SF) semifinalist; (QF) quarterfinalist; (#R) rounds 4, 3, 2, 1; (RR) round-robin stage; (Q#) qualification round; (P#) preliminary round; (DNQ) did not qualify; (A) absent; (Z#) Davis/Fed Cup Zonal Group (with number indication) or (PO) play-off; (G) gold, (S) silver or (B) bronze Olympic/Paralympic medal; (NMS) not a Masters tournament; (NTI) not a Tier I tournament; (P) postponed; (NH) not held; (SR) strike rate (events won / competed); (W–L) win–loss record.
To avoid confusion and double counting, these charts are updated at the conclusion of a tournament or when the player's participation has ended.

Only main-draw results in WTA Tour, Grand Slam tournaments, Billie Jean King Cup, United Cup, Hopman Cup and Olympic Games are included in win–loss records.

=== Singles ===
Current through the 2026 Wuhan Open.

Tournament	2022	2023	2024	2025	2026	SR	W–L	Win %
Grand Slam tournaments
Australian Open	A	1R	2R	Q3	A	0 / 2	1–2	33%
French Open	A	1R	Q2	A	A	0 / 1	0–1	0%
Wimbledon	A	Q3	2R	A	A	0 / 1	1–1	50%
US Open	A	Q1	1R	A	A	0 / 1	0–1	0%
Win–Loss	0–0	0–2	2–3	0–0	0–0	0 / 5	2–5	29%
WTA 1000 tournaments
Qatar Open	A	NTI	A	A	A	0 / 0	0–0	–
Dubai Championships	NTI	A	A	A	A	0 / 0	0–0	–
Indian Wells Open	A	A	A	A	A	0 / 0	0–0	–
Miami Open	A	1R	2R	A	A	0 / 2	1–2	33%
Madrid Open	A	1R	1R	A	A	0 / 2	0–2	0%
Italian Open	A	A	2R	A	A	0 / 1	1–1	50%
Canadian Open	A	A	A	A	A	0 / 0	0–0	–
Cincinnati Open	A	A	A	A	A	0 / 0	0–0	–
China Open	NH	A	A	A	A	0 / 0	0–0	–
Wuhan Open	Not Held		A	A	A	0 / 0	0–0	–
Win–Loss	0–0	0–2	2–3	0–0	0–0	0 / 5	2–5	29%
Career statistics
	2022	2023	2024	2025	2026	SR	W–L	Win %
Tournaments	1	5	7	0	1	Career total: 14		
Titles	0	0	0	0	0	Career total: 0		
Finals	0	0	0	0	0	Career total: 0		
Hardcourt Win–Loss	0–1	0–3	3–4	0–0	0–1	0 / 6	3–9	25%
Clay Win–Loss	0–0	0–2	1–2	0–0	0–0	0 / 2	1–4	20%
Grass Win–Loss	0–0	0–0	1–1	0–0	0–0	0 / 0	1–1	50%
Overall Win–Loss	0–1	0–5	5–7	0–0	0–1	0 / 8	5–14	26%
Year-end ranking	139	133	163	805		$128,404		

=== Doubles ===
Current through the 2026 Wuhan Open.

Tournament	2023	2024	2025	2026	SR	W–L	Win %
Grand Slam tournaments
Australian Open	A	A	A	A	0 / 0	0–0	–
French Open	A	A	A	A	0 / 0	0–0	–
Wimbledon	A	A	A	A	0 / 0	0–0	–
US Open	A	A	A	A	0 / 0	0–0	–
Win–Loss	0–0	0–0	0–0	0–0	0 / 0	0–0	–
WTA 1000 tournaments
Qatar Open	NTI	A	A	A	0 / 0	0–0	–
Dubai Championships	A	A	A	A	0 / 0	0–0	–
Indian Wells Open	A	A	A	A	0 / 0	0–0	–
Miami Open	1R	A	A	A	0 / 1	0–1	0%
Madrid Open	1R	A	A	A	0 / 1	0–1	0%
Italian Open	A	A	A	A	0 / 0	0–0	–
Canadian Open	A	A	A	A	0 / 0	0–0	–
Cincinnati Open	A	A	A	A	0 / 0	0–0	–
Wuhan Open	NH	A	A	A	0 / 0	0–0	–
China Open	A	A	A	A	0 / 0	0–0	–
Win–Loss	0–2	0–0	0–0	0–0	0 / 2	0–2	0%
Career statistics
	2023	2024	2025	2026	SR	W–L	Win %
Tournaments	2	1	0	0	Career total: 3		
Titles	0	0	0	0	Career total: 0		
Finals	0	0	0	0	Career total: 0		
Hardcourt Win–Loss	0–1	0–1	0–0	0–0	0 / 2	0–2	0%
Clay Win–Loss	0–1	0–0	0–0	0–0	0 / 1	0–1	0%
Grass Win–Loss	0–0	0–0	0–0	0–0	0 / 0	0–0	–
Overall Win–Loss	0–2	0–1	0–0	0–0	0 / 3	0–3	0%
Year-end ranking	1079						

== ITF Circuit finals ==
=== Singles: 15 (15 titles) ===
Legend W60 tournaments (1–0) W40 tournaments (4–0) W25 tournaments (10–0)	Finals by surface Hard (1–0) Clay (14–0)

Result	W–L	Date	Tournament	Tier	Surface	Opponent	Score
Win	1–0	Feb 2022	ITF Tucumán, Argentina	W25	Clay	(Brazil) Carolina Alves	6–3, 6–3
Win	2–0	Feb 2022	ITF Tucumán, Argentina	W25	Clay	(Argentina) Paula Ormaechea	6–3, 1–6, 6–4
Win	3–0	Jun 2022	ITF Klosters, Switzerland	W25	Clay	(Czech Republic) Michaela Bayerlová	7–5, 7–5
Win	4–0	Aug 2022	ITF Danderyd, Sweden	W25	Clay	(Germany) Mona Barthel	6–1, 6–3
Win	5–0	Aug 2022	ITF Mogyoród, Hungary	W25	Clay	(Germany) Luisa Meyer auf der Heide	6–0, 6–0
Win	6–0	Aug 2022	ITF Braunschweig, Germany	W25	Clay	(Germany) Noma Noha Akugue	6–3, 6–1
Win	7–0	Sep 2022	ITF Pula, Italy	W25	Clay	(Italy) Jessica Pieri	6–4, 2–0 ret.
Win	8–0	Nov 2022	ITF Pula, Italy	W25	Clay	(Switzerland) Ylena In-Albon	6–0, 6–1
Win	9–0	Mar 2023	ITF Bangalore, India	W40	Hard	(India) Ankita Raina	0–6, 6–4, 6–0
Win	10–0	Aug 2023	Ladies Open Hechingen, Germany	W60	Clay	(Slovenia) Ziva Falkner	6–3, 6–1
Win	11–0	Aug 2023	ITF Leipzig, Germany	W25+H	Clay	(Russia) Darya Astakhova	6–3, 6–3
Win	12–0	Sep 2023	ITF Oldenzaal, Netherlands	W40	Clay	(Netherlands) Anouk Koevermans	7–5, 6–2
Win	13–0	Oct 2023	ITF Pula, Italy	W25	Clay	(Argentina) Guillermina Naya	6–4, 6–3
Win	14–0	Nov 2023	ITF Heraklion, Greece	W40	Clay	Ekaterina Makarova	6–1, 6–3
Win	15–0	Nov 2023	ITF Guadalajara, Mexico	W40	Clay	(Ukraine) Valeriya Strakhova	6–1, 6–3

=== Doubles: 1 (title) ===
Legend W25 tournaments (1–0)	Finals by surface Clay (1–0)

Result	Date	Tournament	Tier	Surface	Partner	Opponents	Score
Win	Jun 2022	ITF Klosters, Switzerland	W25	Clay	(Romania) Miriam Bulgaru	(Germany) Tayisiya Morderger (Germany) Yana Morderger	6–0, 6–1

== ITF Junior Circuit finals ==
=== Singles: 9 (7 titles, 2 runner-ups) ===
Legend
Grade A (1–0)
Grade 1 / B1 (3–2)
Grade 2 (2–0)
Grade 3 (1–0)

Result	W–L	Date	Tournament	Tier	Surface	Opponent	Score
Win	1–0	Sep 2020	ITF Cairo, Egypt	Grade 2	Clay	(Egypt) Hania Abouelsaad	6–0, 4–6, 6–2
Win	2–0	Oct 2020	ITF Istanbul, Turkey	Grade 3	Hard	(Czech Republic) Linda Klimovičová	6–2, 6–0
Win	3–0	Jul 2021	ITF Plzeň, Czech Republic	Grade 2	Clay	(Romania) Anca Todoni	6–3, 6–0
Win	4–0	Aug 2021	ITF College Park, United States	Grade 1	Hard	(Russia) Mirra Andreeva	6–1, 6–0
Win	5–0	Sep 2021	ITF Charleroi, Belgium	Grade 1	Clay	(Czech Republic) Barbora Palicová	1–6, 6–3, 6–1
Win	6–0	Oct 2021	ITF Vrsar, Croatia	Grade 1	Clay	(Switzerland) Céline Naef	7–6^{(7–2)}, 6–2
Loss	6–1	Nov 2021	ITF Guadalajara, Mexico	Grade 1	Clay	(Czech Republic) Linda Fruhvirtová	4–6, 6–7^{(5–7)}
Win	7–1	Nov 2021	ITF Mérida, Mexico	Grade A	Clay	(Czech Republic) Linda Fruhvirtová	7–5, 7–5
Loss	7–2	Dec 2021	ITF Bradenton, United States	Grade 1	Clay	(Czech Republic) Linda Fruhvirtová	0–2 ret.

=== Doubles: 11 (5 titles, 6 runner-ups) ===
Legend
Grade A (0–2)
Grade 1 / B1 (3–2)
Grade 2 (2–2)

Result	W–L	Date	Tournament	Tier	Surface	Partner	Opponents	Score
Win	1–0	Sep 2020	ITF Cairo, Egypt	Grade 2	Clay	(Russia) Kira Pavlova	(Egypt) Mariam Ibrahim (Egypt) Jermine Sherif	7–6^{(7–5)}, 6–2
Win	2–0	Mar 2021	ITF Santo Domingo, Dominican Republic	Grade 2	Hard	(Czech Republic) Linda Fruhvirtová	(Czech Republic) Lucie Havlíčková (Sweden) Klara Milicevic	6–4, 6–3
Loss	2–1	Mar 2021	ITF Barranquilla, Colombia	Grade 1	Hard	(United States) Madison Sieg	(Croatia) Lucija Ciric Bagaric (Denmark) Johanne Svendsen	4–6, 4–6
Loss	2–2	May 2021	ITF Oberpullendorf, Austria	Grade 2	Clay	(Czech Republic) Linda Klimovičová	(France) Anaelle Leclercq (Japan) Erika Matsuda	3–6, 1–6
Loss	2–3	Jul 2021	ITF Plzeň, Czech Republic	Grade 2	Clay	(Czech Republic) Dominika Šalková	(Turkey) Aysegul Mert (Turkey) Ozlem Uslu	6–2, 4–6, [10–12]
Win	3–3	Aug 2021	ITF College Park, United States	Grade 1	Hard	(Croatia) Lucija Ciric Bagaric	(Thailand) Pimrada Jattavapornvanit (China) Yichen Zhao	6–2, 6–3
Win	4–3	Oct 2021	ITF Vrsar, Croatia	Grade 1	Clay	(Czech Republic) Barbora Palicová	(Croatia) Lucija Ciric Bagaric (Czech Republic) Lucie Havlíčková	3–6, 6–3, [10–7]
Loss	4–4	Oct 2021	ITF Cape Town, South Africa	Grade A	Hard	(Czech Republic) Barbora Palicová	(Croatia) Petra Marčinko (Denmark) Johanne Svendsen	3–6, 2–6
Win	5–4	Nov 2021	ITF Guadalajara, Mexico	Grade 1	Clay	(Czech Republic) Linda Fruhvirtová	(United States) Liv Hovde (United States) Ava Krug	6–1, 6–3
Loss	5–5	Dec 2021	ITF Bradenton, United States	Grade 1	Clay	(Czech Republic) Linda Fruhvirtová	(Croatia) Petra Marčinko (Russia) Diana Shnaider	3–6, 7–5, [9–11]
Loss	5–6	Dec 2021	ITF Plantation, United States	Grade A	Clay	(Czech Republic) Linda Fruhvirtová	(Croatia) Petra Marčinko (Russia) Diana Shnaider	6–7^{(5–7)}, 0–6

== Longest winning streak ==
=== 27-match win streak (2022) ===
#	Tournament	Category	Start date	Surface	Rd	Opponent	Rank	Score
–	ITF Le Havre, France	25,000	21 March 2022	Clay	2R	(France) Elsa Jacquemot	236	6–7^{(0–7)}, 4–6
1	ITF Klosters, Switzerland	W25	20 June 2022	Clay	1R	(Italy) Gloria Ceschi (Q)	1019	6–4, 6–0
2	ITF Klosters, Switzerland	W25	20 June 2022	Clay	2R	(Germany) Tayisiya Morderger	574	6–1, 6–0
3	ITF Klosters, Switzerland	W25	20 June 2022	Clay	QF	(Germany) Emily Seibold (Q)	553	6–4, 6–1
4	ITF Klosters, Switzerland	W25	20 June 2022	Clay	SF	(Czech Republic) Barbora Palicová	421	6–4, 6–1
5	ITF Klosters, Switzerland	W25	20 June 2022	Clay	F (1)	(Czech Republic) Michaela Bayerlová	484	7–5, 7–5
6	ITF Danderyd, Sweden	W25	8 August 2022	Clay	1R	(United States) Madison Bourguignon (Q)	1185	6–0, 6–3
7	ITF Danderyd, Sweden	W25	8 August 2022	Clay	2R	(Norway) Emilie Elde (Q)	n/a	6–1, 6–0
8	ITF Danderyd, Sweden	W25	8 August 2022	Clay	QF	(Greece) Sapfo Sakellaridi (6)	337	6–1, 6–1
9	ITF Danderyd, Sweden	W25	8 August 2022	Clay	SF	(Denmark) Sofia Samavati (3)	320	6–2, 4–6, 6–1
10	ITF Danderyd, Sweden	W25	8 August 2022	Clay	F (2)	(Germany) Mona Barthel (7)	372	6–1, 6–3
11	ITF Mogyoród, Hungary	W25	15 August 2022	Clay	1R	(France) Victoria Muntean (Q)	611	6–3, 6–1
12	ITF Mogyoród, Hungary	W25	15 August 2022	Clay	2R	(Japan) Rina Saigo (Q)	670	6–2, 6–1
13	ITF Mogyoród, Hungary	W25	15 August 2022	Clay	QF	(Argentina) Julia Riera	403	7–6^{(8–6)}, 6–1
14	ITF Mogyoród, Hungary	W25	15 August 2022	Clay	SF	(Romania) Miriam Bulgaru	429	6–2, 6–1
15	ITF Mogyoród, Hungary	W25	15 August 2022	Clay	F (3)	(Germany) Luisa Meyer auf der Heide	527	6–0, 6–0
16	ITF Braunschweig, Germany	W25	22 August 2022	Clay	1R	(Germany) Helena Buchwald (Q)	n/a	6–1, 6–1
17	ITF Braunschweig, Germany	W25	22 August 2022	Clay	2R	(Italy) Nuria Brancaccio	433	6–2, 6–1
18	ITF Braunschweig, Germany	W25	22 August 2022	Clay	QF	(Poland) Weronika Falkowska (5)	289	6–4, 6–2
19	ITF Braunschweig, Germany	W25	22 August 2022	Clay	SF	(Germany) Julia Middendorf	480	6–2, 6–0
20	ITF Braunschweig, Germany	W25	22 August 2022	Clay	F (4)	(Germany) Noma Noha Akugue	404	6–3, 6–1
21	ITF Pula, Italy	W25	12 September 2022	Clay	1R	(Italy) Tatiana Pieri (Q)	674	6–3, 7–5
22	ITF Pula, Italy	W25	12 September 2022	Clay	2R	(Italy) Miriana Tona (Q)	696	6–2, 6–1
23	ITF Pula, Italy	W25	12 September 2022	Clay	QF	(Spain) Jéssica Bouzas Maneiro (5)	281	6–1, 6–1
24	ITF Pula, Italy	W25	12 September 2022	Clay	SF	(Greece) Sapfo Sakellaridi (7)	338	4–6, 7–5, 6–0
25	ITF Pula, Italy	W25	12 September 2022	Clay	F (5)	(Italy) Jessica Pieri	497	6–4, 2–0 ret.
26	San Sebastián Open, Spain	W60	26 September 2022	Clay	1R	(Spain) Ane Mintegi del Olmo (WC)	505	6–4, 6–2
27	San Sebastián Open, Spain	W60	26 September 2022	Clay	2R	(Spain) Lucía Cortez Llorca (WC)	542	6–3, 7–6^{(7–0)}
–	San Sebastián Open, Spain	W60	26 September 2022	Clay	QF	(Netherlands) Eva Vedder	242	3–6, 6–2, 4–6

== Double bagel matches ==
Result	Year	W–L	Tournament	Tier	Surface	Opponent	vsRank	Round	Rank
Win	2022	1–0	ITF Tucumán, Argentina	W25	Clay	(United States) Gabriella Price	719	1R	1078
Win	2022	2–0	ITF Mogyoród, Hungary	W25	Clay	(Germany) Luisa Meyer auf der Heide	527	F	318
