= Lena Papadakis =

German tennis player

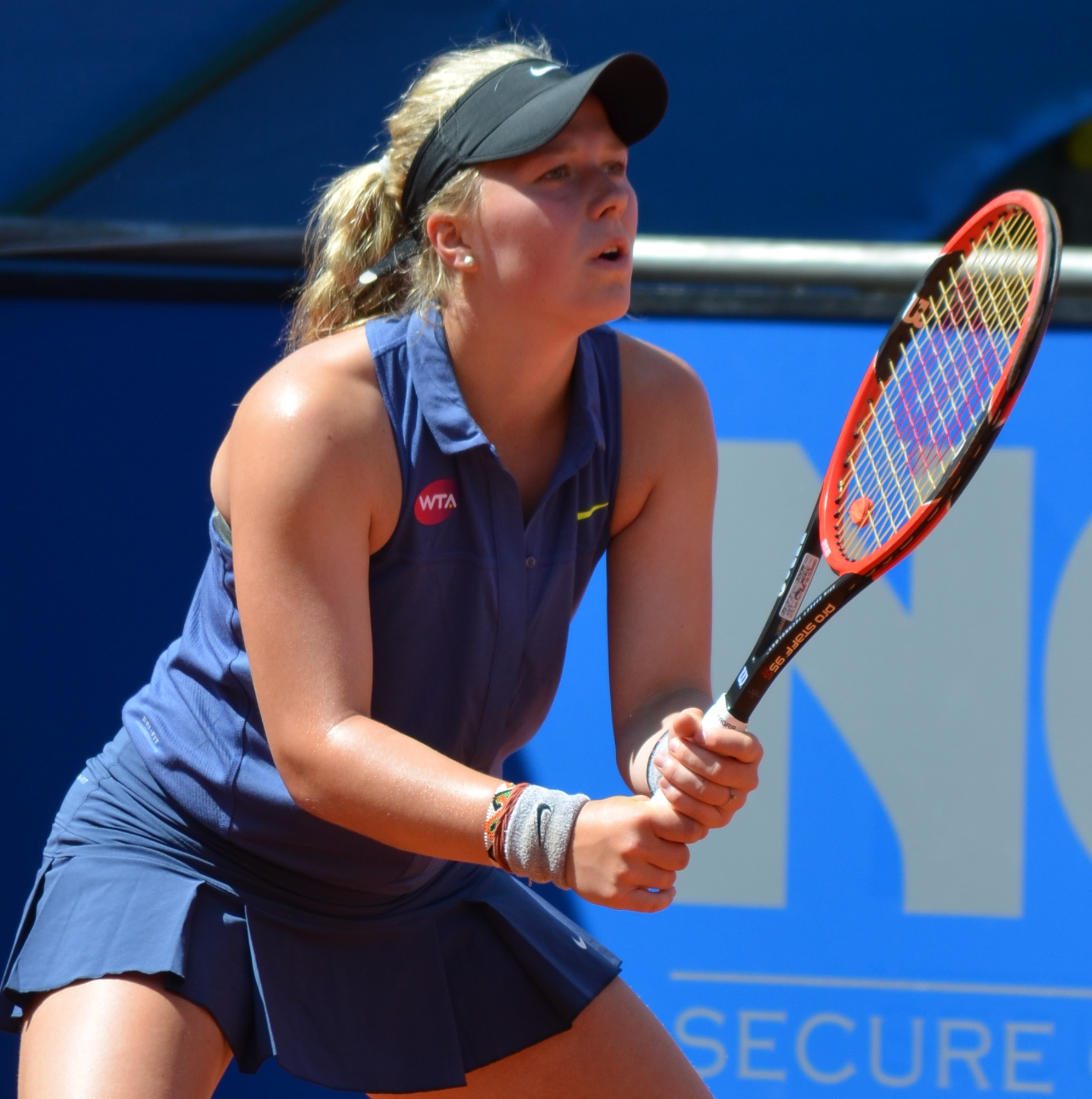
- Papadakis at the 2015 Nürnberger Versicherungscup
- Country (sports): Germany
- Born: 23 August 1998 (age 28) Berlin, Germany
- Coach: Christopher Papadakis
- Prize money: US$148,647

Singles
- Career record: 221–180
- Career titles: 2 ITF
- Highest ranking: No. 250 (9 January 2023)

Doubles
- Career record: 125–108
- Career titles: 9 ITF
- Highest ranking: No. 121 (14 October 2024)

Lena Papadakis (née Rüffer; born 23 August 1998) is a German inactive tennis player.

Papadakis has a career-high singles ranking by the WTA of No. 250, reached in January 2023, and a career-high doubles ranking of No. 121, achieved in October 2024.

== Career ==
She made her WTA Tour debut at the 2015 Nürnberger Versicherungscup, partnering with Katharina Gerlach in the doubles draw.

== ITF Circuit finals ==
=== Singles: 6 (2 titles, 4 runner-ups) ===
Legend W25 tournaments (1–3) W15 tournaments (1–1)	Finals by surface Clay (2–4)

Result	W–L	Date	Tournament	Tier	Surface	Opponent	Score
Loss	0–1	Feb 2018	ITF Bergamo, Italy	W15	Clay (i)	(Italy) Martina Colmegna	2–6, 1–6
Win	1–1	May 2021	ITF Heraklion, Greece	W15	Clay	(Austria) Melanie Klaffner	6–3, 6–3
Win	2–1	Jan 2022	ITF Blumenau-Gaspar, Brazil	W25	Clay	(Slovenia) Pia Lovrič	6–1, 7–6^{(6)}
Loss	2–2	Jun 2022	ITF Annenheim, Austria	W25	Clay	(Germany) Laura Siegemund	3–6, 2–6
Loss	2–3	Sep 2022	ITF Frýdek-Místek, Czech Republic	W25	Clay	(Czech Republic) Julie Štruplová	3–6, 6–2, 4–6
Loss	2–4	Dec 2023	ITF Nairobi, Kenya	W25	Clay	(Kenya) Angella Okutoyi	3–6, 6–1, 1–6

=== Doubles: 18 (9 titles, 9 runner-ups) ===
Legend W60/75 tournaments (2–2) W40/50 tournaments (2–0) W25/35 tournaments (3–5) W10/15 tournaments (2–2)	Finals by surface Hard (3–0) Clay (4–9) Carpet (2–0)

Result	W–L	Date	Tournament	Tier	Surface	Partner	Opponents	Score
Win	1–0	Oct 2015	Ismaning Open, Germany	W10	Carpet (i)	(Germany) Anna Zaja	(Belgium) Michaela Boev (Germany) Hristina Dishkova	5–7, 7–6^{(3)}, [10–3]
Loss	1–1	Aug 2017	Ladies Open Hechingen, Germany	W60	Clay	(Germany) Romy Kölzer	(Italy) Camilla Rosatello (Georgia (country)) Sofia Shapatava	2–6, 4–6
Win	2–1	Dec 2017	ITF Milovice, Czech Republic	W15	Hard (i)	(Slovakia) Jana Jablonovská	(Ukraine) Maryna Kolb (Ukraine) Nadiya Kolb	6–1, 6–3
Loss	2–2	Mar 2018	ITF Palmanova, Spain	W15	Clay	(Germany) Katharina Gerlach	(Japan) Yukina Saigo (Japan) Aiko Yoshitomi	4–6, 2–6
Loss	2–3	Mar 2018	ITF Pula, Italy	W25	Clay	(Germany) Katharina Gerlach	(Georgia (country)) Ekaterine Gorgodze (Georgia (country)) Sofia Shapatava	4–6, 6–7^{(5)}
Loss	2–4	Mar 2021	ITF Gonesse, France	W15	Clay (i)	(Germany) Anna Gabric	(Slovenia) Tina Cvetkovič (United States) Zoe Howard	7–6^{(5)}, 3–6, [5–10]
Win	3–4	Jun 2022	ITF Annenheim, Austria	W25	Clay	(United States) Jessie Aney	(Greece) Martha Matoula (Romania) Arina Vasilescu	1–6, 6–3, [11–9]
Win	4–4	Sep 2022	ITF Vienna, Austria	W25	Clay	(Czech Republic) Anna Sisková	(Slovenia) Živa Falkner (Hungary) Amarissa Tóth	7–6^{(8)}, 6–4
Loss	4–5	Sep 2022	ITF Jablonec, Czech Republic	W25	Clay	(Czech Republic) Anna Sisková	(Kazakhstan) Anna Danilina (Ukraine) Valeriya Strakhova	5–7, 1–6
Loss	4–6	Mar 2023	ITF Mosquera, Colombia	W25	Clay	(Germany) Silvia Ambrosio	(Russia) Irina Khromacheva (Ukraine) Valeriya Strakhova	7–5, 6–7^{(3)}, [8–10]
Loss	4–7	May 2023	ITF Villach, Austria	W25	Clay	(United States) Jessie Aney	(Switzerland) Jenny Dürst (Slovenia) Nika Radišić	2–6, 6–7^{(4)}
Win	5–7	Nov 2023	ITF Solarino, Italy	W25	Carpet	(United States) Jessie Aney	(Italy) Giorgia Pedone (Italy) Lisa Pigato	6–3, 3–6, [10–6]
Loss	5–8	Dec 2023	ITF Nairobi, Kenya	W25	Clay	(United States) Jessie Aney	(Burundi) Sada Nahimana (Kenya) Angella Okutoyi	4–6, 6–3, [7–10]
Win	6–8	Jan 2024	ITF Indore, India	W50	Hard	(United States) Jessie Aney	(Japan) Saki Imamura (Japan) Mana Kawamura	2–6, 6–0, [10–7]
Win	7–8	Mar 2024	ITF Mâcon, France	W50	Hard (i)	(Italy) Silvia Ambrosio	(United Kingdom) Madeleine Brooks (Netherlands) Isabelle Haverlag	5–7, 7–5, [10–7]
Win	8–8	Apr 2024	Chiasso Open, Switzerland	W75	Clay	(United Kingdom) Emily Appleton	(Greece) Despina Papamichail (Switzerland) Simona Waltert	4–6, 6–4, [10–6]
Win	9–8	May 2024	Grado Tennis Cup, Italy	W75	Clay	(United States) Jessie Aney	(Spain) Yvonne Cavallé Reimers (Italy) Aurora Zantedeschi	6–4, 7–5
Loss	9–9	Jun 2024	ITS Cup Olomouc, Czech Republic	W75	Clay	(United States) Jessie Aney	Amina Anshba (Greece) Valentini Grammatikopoulou	2–6, 4–6
