= Ladies Open Hechingen =

- 2024 Ladies Open Hechingen

Women's World Tennis Tour
- Event name: boso Ladies Open Hechingen
- Location: Hechingen, Germany
- Venue: Tennis-Club Hechingen e.V.
- Category: ITF Women's Circuit
- Surface: Clay
- Draw: 32S/32Q/16D
- Prize money: $60,000
- Website: www.tchechingen.de

The Ladies Open Hechingen (currently sponsored as the boso Ladies Open Hechingen) is a tournament for professional female tennis players played on outdoor clay courts. The event is classified as a $60,000 ITF Women's Circuit tournament and has been held in Hechingen, Germany, since 1999.

== Past finals ==
=== Singles ===
Year	Champion	Runners-up	Score
2026	(Czech Republic) Barbora Palicová	(France) Fiona Ferro	5–7, 7–5, 6–4
2025	(Czech Republic) Nikola Bartůňková	(Austria) Julia Grabher	7–5, 6–2
2024	(Hungary) Anna Bondár	Ekaterina Makarova	6–0, 6–2
2023	(Czech Republic) Brenda Fruhvirtová	(Slovenia) Živa Falkner	6–3, 6–1
2022	(Croatia) Lea Bošković	(Germany) Noma Noha Akugue	7–5, 3–6, 6–4
2020–21	Tournament cancelled due to the COVID-19 pandemic		
2019	(Austria) Barbara Haas	(Serbia) Olga Danilović	6–2, 6–1
2018	(Georgia (country)) Ekaterine Gorgodze	(Germany) Laura Siegemund	6–2, 6–1
2017	(Germany) Tamara Korpatsch	(Italy) Deborah Chiesa	2–6, 7–6^{(7–5)}, 6–2
2016	(Slovenia) Dalila Jakupović	(Netherlands) Cindy Burger	6–3, 4–6, 7–6^{(7–5)}
2015	(Switzerland) Romina Oprandi	(Romania) Ana Bogdan	6–3, 1–6, 6–2
2014	(Germany) Carina Witthöft	(Germany) Laura Siegemund	4–6, 6–4, 6–3
2013	(Germany) Carina Witthöft	(France) Laura Thorpe	6–1, 6–4
2012	(Slovenia) Maša Zec Peškirič	(Bosnia and Herzegovina) Mervana Jugić-Salkić	6–0, 6–4
2011	(Germany) Tatjana Malek	(Germany) Sarah Gronert	6–3, 6–4
2010	(Poland) Magda Linette	(Spain) Sílvia Soler Espinosa	7–5, 3–6, 6–2
2009	(Austria) Yvonne Meusburger	(Sweden) Johanna Larsson	5–7, 7–5, 6–2
2008	(Slovenia) Maša Zec Peškirič	(Slovakia) Kristína Kučová	3–6, 7–6^{(7–1)}, 6–3
2007	(Ukraine) Oxana Lyubtsova	(Croatia) Ana Vrljić	6–3, 6–2
2006	(Germany) Tatjana Malek	(Romania) Magda Mihalache	6–2, 6–3
2005	(Belgium) Kirsten Flipkens	(Slovakia) Magdaléna Rybáriková	6–4, 6–3
2004	(Czech Republic) Eva Hrdinová	(Italy) Nathalie Viérin	6–4, 6–3
2003	(Socialist Federal Republic of Yugoslavia) Ana Timotić	(Netherlands) Elise Tamaëla	4–6, 6–4, 6–2
2002	(Germany) Sandra Klösel	(Argentina) Natalia Gussoni	6–3, 6–0
2001	(Netherlands) Amanda Hopmans	(Socialist Federal Republic of Yugoslavia) Katarina Dašković	7–5, 6–1
2000	(Germany) Susi Lohrmann	(Germany) Syna Schmidle	6–3, 1–6, 6–3
1999	(Germany) Sabine Klaschka	(Hungary) Eszter Molnár	7–6, 6–2

=== Doubles ===
Year	Champions	Runners-up	Score
2026	(Italy) Enola Chiesa (Slovenia) Dalila Jakupović	(Greece) Sapfo Sakellaridi (Italy) Aurora Zantedeschi	6–3, 2–6, [12–10]
2025	(Slovakia) Renáta Jamrichová; Elena Pridankina	(China) Feng Shuo (China) Li Zongyu	6–2, 6–2
2024	(Czech Republic) Michaela Bayerlová (Georgia (country)) Sofia Shapatava	(Germany) Anna Gabric (Germany) Mia Mack	6–2, 5–7, [10–6]
2023	Alena Fomina-Klotz (North Macedonia) Lina Gjorcheska	(Georgia (country)) Ekaterine Gorgodze (Germany) Katharina Hobgarski	6–2, 6–4
2022	Irina Khromacheva; Diana Shnaider	(Serbia) Tamara Čurović (United States) Chiara Scholl	6–2, 6–3
2020–21	Tournament cancelled due to the COVID-19 pandemic		
2019	(Romania) Cristina Dinu (North Macedonia) Lina Gjorcheska	(Serbia) Olga Danilović (Spain) Georgina García Pérez	4–6, 7–5, [10–7]
2018	(Russia) Polina Monova (Slovakia) Chantal Škamlová	(Kyrgyzstan) Ksenia Palkina (Georgia (country)) Sofia Shapatava	6–4, 6–3
2017	(Italy) Camilla Rosatello (Georgia (country)) Sofia Shapatava	(Germany) Romy Kölzer (Germany) Lena Rüffer	6–2, 6–4
2016	(Germany) Nicola Geuer (Germany) Anna Zaja	(Germany) Vivian Heisen (Austria) Pia König	6–3, 6–1
2015	(Venezuela) Andrea Gámiz (Ukraine) Anastasiya Vasylyeva	(Germany) Vivian Heisen (Philippines) Katharina Lehnert	4–6, 7–6^{(7–4)}, [10–3]
2014	(Romania) Elena Bogdan (Russia) Valeria Solovyeva	(Germany) Carolin Daniels (Germany) Antonia Lottner	6–3, 6–1
2013	(Czech Republic) Barbora Krejčíková (Czech Republic) Kateřina Siniaková	(Romania) Laura-Ioana Andrei (France) Laura Thorpe	6–1, 6–4
2012	(Bosnia and Herzegovina) Mervana Jugić-Salkić (Austria) Sandra Klemenschits	(Russia) Natela Dzalamidze (Czech Republic) Renata Voráčová	6–2, 6–3
2011	(Austria) Sandra Klemenschits (Germany) Tatjana Malek	(Germany) Korina Perkovic (Germany) Laura Siegemund	4–6, 6–2, [10–7]
2010	(Romania) Irina-Camelia Begu (France) Anaïs Laurendon	(Germany) Julia Schruff (Japan) Erika Sema	6–2, 4–6, [10–8]
2009	(Austria) Yvonne Meusburger (Germany) Jasmin Wöhr	(Argentina) Erica Krauth (Sweden) Hanna Nooni	6–2, 7–6^{(7–1)}
2008	(Indonesia) Yayuk Basuki (Indonesia) Romana Tedjakusuma	(Croatia) Darija Jurak (Germany) Carmen Klaschka	2–6, 6–2, [10–6]
2007	(Czech Republic) Michaela Paštiková (Germany) Kathrin Wörle	(Croatia) Darija Jurak (Bosnia and Herzegovina) Sandra Martinović	6–4, 6–4
2006	(Slovakia) Eva Fislová (Slovakia) Stanislava Hrozenská	(Ukraine) Kristina Antoniychuk (Romania) Raluca Olaru	6–3, 6–7^{(3–7)}, 6–3
2005	(Germany) Kristina Barrois (Germany) Jasmin Wöhr	(Czech Republic) Renata Voráčová (Czech Republic) Sandra Záhlavová	4–6, 7–6^{(7–3)}, 6–4
2004	(Slovakia) Eva Fislová (Slovakia) Stanislava Hrozenská	(Argentina) Erica Krauth (Germany) Jasmin Wöhr	3–6, 6–3, 6–3
2003	(Germany) Angelika Bachmann (Germany) Jasmin Wöhr	(Austria) Daniela Klemenschits (Austria) Sandra Klemenschits	6–1, 6–4
2002	(Germany) Andrea Glass (Germany) Jasmin Wöhr	(Germany) Lydia Steinbach (New Zealand) Shelley Stephens	6–4, 7–5
2001	(Germany) Magdalena Kučerová (Germany) Lydia Steinbach	(Austria) Daniela Klemenschits (Austria) Sandra Klemenschits	5–7, 6–2, 6–1
2000	(Brazil) Miriam D'Agostini (Germany) Angelika Rösch	(Czech Republic) Michaela Paštiková (Bulgaria) Desislava Topalova	7–6^{(7–3)}, 6–2
1999	(Germany) Jennifer Tinnacher (Sweden) Maria Wolfbrandt	(Germany) Gréta Arn (Hungary) Eszter Molnár	6–4, 6–3
