= 2009 US Open – Men's singles qualifying =

Men's singles qualifying
- 2009 US Open

Events
Singles	men	women		boys	girls
Doubles	men	women	mixed	boys	girls
WC Singles	men	women	quad
WC Doubles	men	women	quad
Legends	men	women	mixed

Qualification
Singles	men	women
← 2008 ·	US Open	· 2010 →

== Seeds ==
1. (Brazil) Thomaz Bellucci (qualified)
2. (Argentina) Horacio Zeballos (qualified)
3. (Australia) Peter Luczak (qualifying competition, lucky loser)
4. (France) Adrian Mannarino (second round)
5. (France) Josselin Ouanna (qualified)
6. (Canada) Frank Dancevic (first round)
7. (Portugal) Rui Machado (qualifying competition, lucky loser)
8. (Croatia) Roko Karanušić (qualifying competition)
9. (United States) Michael Russell (second round)
10. (Germany) Michael Berrer (qualified)
11. (Colombia) Santiago Giraldo (second round)
12. (Poland) Łukasz Kubot (second round)
13. (Germany) Daniel Brands (second round)
14. (France) Nicolas Mahut (first round)
15. (United States) Vince Spadea (first round)
16. (United States) Alex Bogomolov Jr. (first round)
17. (Italy) Paolo Lorenzi (first round)
18. (Israel) Harel Levy (second round)
19. (Austria) Stefan Koubek (qualifying competition)
20. (France) Arnaud Clément (first round)
21. (Switzerland) Stéphane Bohli (second round)
22. (South Africa) Kevin Anderson (first round)
23. (France) Sébastien de Chaunac (second round)
24. (France) Laurent Recouderc (first round)
25. (Slovenia) Blaž Kavčič (qualifying competition)
26. (France) Alexandre Sidorenko (second round)
27. (Australia) Carsten Ball (qualified)
28. (Slovakia) Lukáš Lacko (qualifying competition)
29. (France) Édouard Roger-Vasselin (first round)
30. (Slovakia) Dominik Hrbatý (first round)
31. (Colombia) Alejandro Falla (qualified)
32. (Switzerland) Marco Chiudinelli (qualified)

== Qualifiers ==
1. (Brazil) Thomaz Bellucci
2. (Argentina) Horacio Zeballos
3. (United States) Michael Yani
4. (Turkey) Marsel İlhan
5. (France) Josselin Ouanna
6. (United States) Jesse Witten
7. (Germany) Dieter Kindlmann
8. (Colombia) Alejandro Falla
9. (Canada) Peter Polansky
10. (Germany) Michael Berrer
11. (Argentina) Juan Pablo Brzezicki
12. (Australia) Carsten Ball
13. (Switzerland) Marco Chiudinelli
14. (Ecuador) Giovanni Lapentti
15. (United States) Donald Young
16. (India) Somdev Devvarman

== Lucky losers ==
1. (Australia) Peter Luczak
2. (Portugal) Rui Machado

== Qualifying draw ==
=== Key ===
- Q = Qualifier
- WC = Wild card
- LL = Lucky loser
- Alt = Alternate
- ITF = ITF entry
- PR = Protected ranking
- SR = Special ranking
- SE = Special exempt
- JE = Junior exempt
- JR = Junior Accelerator Programme entrant
- CO = College Accelerator Programme entrant
- NG = Next Gen Accelerator Program entrant
- w/o = Walkover
- r = Retired
- d = Defaulted

=== First qualifier ===
First round
1	(Brazil) Thomaz Bellucci	6	6
(Italy) Giancarlo Petrazzuolo	2	0
(Bulgaria) Grigor Dimitrov	6	7
(Germany) Tobias Kamke	3	5
WC	(United States) Michael McClune	7^{15}	2	6
(United States) Todd Widom	6^{13}	6	4
(United States) Scoville Jenkins	6	6
30	(Slovakia) Dominik Hrbatý	3	4

Second round
1	(Brazil) Thomaz Bellucci	6	6
(Bulgaria) Grigor Dimitrov	4	3
WC	(United States) Michael McClune	3	4
(United States) Scoville Jenkins	6	6

Qualifying Round
1	(Brazil) Thomaz Bellucci	6	6
(United States) Scoville Jenkins	2	4

=== Second qualifier ===
First round
2	(Argentina) Horacio Zeballos	7	4	6
(Belgium) Xavier Malisse	5	6	1
(Australia) Nick Lindahl	2	1
(Ukraine) Sergei Bubka	6	6
(Brazil) Daniel Dutra da Silva	4	6	7^{9}
(Italy) Riccardo Ghedin	6	3	6^{7}
(Spain) José Checa Calvo	3	4
19	(Austria) Stefan Koubek	6	6

Second round
2	(Argentina) Horacio Zeballos	6	6
(Ukraine) Sergei Bubka	3	4
(Brazil) Daniel Dutra da Silva	3	4
19	(Austria) Stefan Koubek	6	6

Qualifying Round
2	(Argentina) Horacio Zeballos	6	6
19	(Austria) Stefan Koubek	4	1

=== Third qualifier ===
First round
3	(Australia) Peter Luczak	6	6
(Croatia) Ivan Dodig	2	4
(Spain) Pablo Santos-Gonzalez	1	4
(Colombia) Carlos Salamanca	6	6
(South Africa) Raven Klaasen	7	7
(Germany) Matthias Bachinger	5	5
(United States) Michael Yani	6	6
29	(France) Édouard Roger-Vasselin	1	3

Second round
3	(Australia) Peter Luczak	7^{9}	6
(Colombia) Carlos Salamanca	6^{7}	2
(South Africa) Raven Klaasen	6	6^{6}	2
(United States) Michael Yani	1	7^{8}	6

Qualifying Round
3	(Australia) Peter Luczak	4	6^{3}
(United States) Michael Yani	6	7^{7}

=== Fourth qualifier ===
First round
4	(France) Adrian Mannarino	6	6
(Germany) Simon Stadler	2	3
(Russia) Alexander Kudryavtsev	3	4
(Brazil) Ricardo Mello	6	6
(Turkey) Marsel İlhan	6	0	7
WC	(United States) Ryan Harrison	4	6	5
WC	(United States) Jordan Cox	1	2
23	(France) Sébastien de Chaunac	6	6

Second round
4	(France) Adrian Mannarino	2	3
(Brazil) Ricardo Mello	6	6
(Turkey) Marsel İlhan	7^{7}	7^{8}
23	(France) Sébastien de Chaunac	6^{4}	6^{6}

Qualifying Round
(Brazil) Ricardo Mello	4	2
(Turkey) Marsel İlhan	6	6

=== Fifth qualifier ===
First round
5	(France) Josselin Ouanna	6	6
(Czech Republic) Jan Minář	4	3
PR	(Argentina) Gastón Gaudio	1	6^{3}
(Germany) Julian Reister	6	7^{7}
(United Kingdom) Daniel Evans	6^{0}	6^{0}
(Brazil) Júlio Silva	7^{7}	7^{7}
(Dominican Republic) Victor Estrella	7	7^{8}
22	(South Africa) Kevin Anderson	5	6^{6}

Second round
5	(France) Josselin Ouanna	7	7
(Germany) Julian Reister	5	5
(Brazil) Júlio Silva	6	6
(Dominican Republic) Victor Estrella	3	2

Qualifying Round
5	(France) Josselin Ouanna	4	6	6
(Brazil) Júlio Silva	6	4	4

=== Sixth qualifier ===
First round
6	(Canada) Frank Dancevic	6	4	1
(Germany) Dominik Meffert	1	6	6
(United Kingdom) Alex Bogdanovic	6	6^{5}	3
(Austria) Alexander Peya	3	7^{7}	6
(Japan) Go Soeda	2	1
(United States) Jesse Witten	6	6
(Italy) Luigi D'Agord	7^{7}	4	2
21	(Switzerland) Stéphane Bohli	6^{2}	6	6

Second round
(Germany) Dominik Meffert	4	5
(Austria) Alexander Peya	6	7
(United States) Jesse Witten	3	6	6
21	(Switzerland) Stéphane Bohli	6	2	0

Qualifying Round
(Austria) Alexander Peya	4	3
(United States) Jesse Witten	6	6

=== Seventh qualifier ===
First round
7	(Portugal) Rui Machado	6	6
(Brazil) Ricardo Hocevar	4	4
(Mexico) Santiago González	7^{7}	7
WC	(United States) Alexander Domijan	6^{4}	5
(Brazil) Caio Zampieri	4	2
(Germany) Dieter Kindlmann	6	6
WC	(United States) Tim Smyczek	7^{8}	7^{7}
20	(France) Arnaud Clément	6^{6}	6^{4}

Second round
7	(Portugal) Rui Machado	7	6
(Mexico) Santiago González	5	4
(Germany) Dieter Kindlmann	6	6
WC	(United States) Tim Smyczek	2	4

Qualifying Round
7	(Portugal) Rui Machado	6	5	4
(Germany) Dieter Kindlmann	3	7	6

=== Eighth qualifier ===
First round
8	(Croatia) Roko Karanušić	6	6
(Switzerland) George Bastl	0	0
(South Africa) Izak van der Merwe	6	6
(Brazil) Eric Gomes	4	1
(Australia) Joseph Sirianni	0	4
(Republic of Ireland) Conor Niland	6	6
(India) Prakash Amritraj	6^{5}	6	3
31	(Colombia) Alejandro Falla	7^{7}	4	6

Second round
8	(Croatia) Roko Karanušić	6	6
(South Africa) Izak van der Merwe	3	3
(Republic of Ireland) Conor Niland	1	1
31	(Colombia) Alejandro Falla	6	6

Qualifying Round
8	(Croatia) Roko Karanušić	2	2
31	(Colombia) Alejandro Falla	6	6

=== Ninth qualifier ===
First round
9	(United States) Michael Russell	6	7^{8}
(France) David Guez	3	6^{6}
(Canada) Peter Polansky	7^{7}	6
(United States) Alex Kuznetsov	6^{3}	2
(Belgium) Yannick Mertens	6	6
(Spain) Carles Poch-Gradin	4	4
(Japan) Yuichi Sugita	4	1
28	(Slovakia) Lukáš Lacko	6	6

Second round
9	(United States) Michael Russell	7	2	4
(Canada) Peter Polansky	5	6	6
(Belgium) Yannick Mertens	7^{7}	2	2
28	(Slovakia) Lukáš Lacko	6^{5}	6	6

Qualifying Round
(Canada) Peter Polansky	6	6
28	(Slovakia) Lukáš Lacko	3	4

=== Tenth qualifier ===
First round
10	(Germany) Michael Berrer	3	6	7^{7}
(United States) Sam Warburg	6	3	6^{3}
(France) Stéphane Robert	6	6
(France) Vincent Millot	4	4
(United States) Ryler Deheart	2	7^{7}	3
(South Korea) Im Kyu-tae	6	6^{2}	6
(Australia) Samuel Groth	6	3	4
25	(Slovenia) Blaž Kavčič	3	6	6

Second round
10	(Germany) Michael Berrer	6	6
(France) Stéphane Robert	3	2
(South Korea) Im Kyu-tae	5	6^{3}
25	(Slovenia) Blaž Kavčič	7	7^{7}

Qualifying Round
10	(Germany) Michael Berrer	6	6
25	(Slovenia) Blaž Kavčič	2	2

=== Eleventh qualifier ===
First round
11	(Colombia) Santiago Giraldo	7^{7}	7^{9}
(Austria) Martin Fischer	6^{4}	6^{7}
(Argentina) Juan Pablo Brzezicki	6	6
WC	(United States) Tennys Sandgren	4	3
(United States) Lester Cook	6^{4}	5
(Spain) Iñigo Cervantes-Huegun	7^{7}	7
(Switzerland) Michael Lammer	6	6
24	(France) Laurent Recouderc	3	3

Second round
11	(Colombia) Santiago Giraldo	4	4
(Argentina) Juan Pablo Brzezicki	6	6
(Spain) Iñigo Cervantes-Huegun	4	6	2
(Switzerland) Michael Lammer	6	3	6

Qualifying Round
(Argentina) Juan Pablo Brzezicki	6	6
(Switzerland) Michael Lammer	2	1

=== Twelfth qualifier ===
First round
12	(Poland) Łukasz Kubot	6	6
(Czech Republic) Lukáš Dlouhý	0	3
(Japan) Tatsuma Ito	7	6
(Czech Republic) Pavel Šnobel	5	4
(Slovenia) Grega Žemlja	6^{7}	4
(South Africa) Rik de Voest	7^{9}	6
(Argentina) Diego Álvarez	6^{2}	6^{4}
27	(Australia) Carsten Ball	7^{7}	7^{7}

Second round
12	(Poland) Łukasz Kubot	2	6	4
(Japan) Tatsuma Ito	6	3	6
(South Africa) Rik de Voest	4	7	6^{5}
27	(Australia) Carsten Ball	6	5	7^{7}

Qualifying Round
(Japan) Tatsuma Ito	3	2
27	(Australia) Carsten Ball	6	6

=== Thirteenth qualifier ===
First round
13	(Germany) Daniel Brands	3	6	7
(Belgium) Niels Desein	6	3	5
WC	(United States) Ryan Lipman	4	6^{5}
(Ukraine) Illya Marchenko	6	7^{7}
(Australia) Marinko Matosevic	3	0^{r}
(Belgium) Ruben Bemelmans	6	0
(Brazil) João Souza	3	4
32	(Switzerland) Marco Chiudinelli	6	6

Second round
13	(Germany) Daniel Brands	6	5	4
(Ukraine) Illya Marchenko	3	7	6
(Belgium) Ruben Bemelmans	4	4
32	(Switzerland) Marco Chiudinelli	6	6

Qualifying Round
(Ukraine) Illya Marchenko	5	6	3
32	(Switzerland) Marco Chiudinelli	7	2	6

=== Fourteenth qualifier ===
First round
14	(France) Nicolas Mahut	6	1	3
(Ecuador) Giovanni Lapentti	4	6	6
(Uruguay) Marcel Felder	6^{5}	4
WC	(United States) Michael Venus	7^{7}	6
PR	(United States) Zack Fleishman	1	3
(Kazakhstan) Mikhail Kukushkin	6	6
(United Kingdom) James Ward	2	3
18	(Israel) Harel Levy	6	6

Second round
(Ecuador) Giovanni Lapentti	6	6^{1}	6
WC	(United States) Michael Venus	3	7^{7}	3
(Kazakhstan) Mikhail Kukushkin	6	3	6
18	(Israel) Harel Levy	3	6	1

Qualifying Round
(Ecuador) Giovanni Lapentti	6	6
(Kazakhstan) Mikhail Kukushkin	2	4

=== Fifteenth qualifier ===
First round
15	(United States) Vince Spadea	4	6^{2}
(Slovenia) Luka Gregorc	6	7^{7}
(Czech Republic) Lukáš Rosol	6	3	6
(Venezuela) José de Armas	1	6	4
(Italy) Marco Crugnola	6^{2}	4
(United States) Donald Young	7^{7}	6
(Spain) Guillermo Olaso	6	2	7^{7}
17	(Italy) Paolo Lorenzi	2	6	6^{4}

Second round
(Slovenia) Luka Gregorc	6	3	4
(Czech Republic) Lukáš Rosol	4	6	6
(United States) Donald Young	7	6
(Spain) Guillermo Olaso	5	2

Qualifying Round
(Czech Republic) Lukáš Rosol	3	4
(United States) Donald Young	6	6

=== Sixteenth qualifier ===
First round
16	(United States) Alex Bogomolov Jr.	3	3
(India) Somdev Devvarman	6	6
Alt	(Netherlands) Igor Sijsling	6^{7}	6	4
(United Kingdom) Josh Goodall	7^{9}	2	2^{r}
(Poland) Jerzy Janowicz	5	6	6
(Italy) Andrea Stoppini	7	2	3
WC	(United States) Blake Strode	3	1
26	(France) Alexandre Sidorenko	6	6

Second round
(India) Somdev Devvarman	6	6^{6}	6
Alt	(Netherlands) Igor Sijsling	3	7^{8}	3
(Poland) Jerzy Janowicz	7^{7}	6
26	(France) Alexandre Sidorenko	6^{5}	3

Qualifying Round
(India) Somdev Devvarman	6	6
(Poland) Jerzy Janowicz	3	2
