= 2009 US Open – Women's singles qualifying =

Women's singles qualifying
- 2009 US Open

Events
Singles	men	women		boys	girls
Doubles	men	women	mixed	boys	girls
WC Singles	men	women	quad
WC Doubles	men	women	quad
Legends	men	women	mixed

Qualification
Singles	men	women
← 2008 ·	US Open	· 2010 →

== Seeds ==
1. (Italy) Alberta Brianti (moved to main draw)
2. (United Kingdom) Elena Baltacha (qualifying competition)
3. (United Kingdom) Katie O'Brien (second round)
4. (Czech Republic) Sandra Záhlavová (second round)
5. (Germany) Angelique Kerber (qualified)
6. (Chinese Taipei) Chan Yung-jan (qualifying competition)
7. (Slovakia) Kristína Kučová (first round)
8. (Uzbekistan) Akgul Amanmuradova (first round; retired)
9. (France) Pauline Parmentier (qualifying competition)
10. (Spain) Arantxa Parra Santonja (qualifying competition)
11. (Russia) Ekaterina Bychkova (second round)
12. (Czech Republic) Barbora Záhlavová-Strýcová (qualified)
13. (Czech Republic) Klára Zakopalová (qualifying competition)
14. (Croatia) Karolina Šprem (second round)
15. (Germany) Julia Schruff (qualifying competition)
16. (Austria) Yvonne Meusburger (qualified)
17. (Russia) Vitalia Diatchenko (second round)
18. (Russia) Vesna Manasieva (qualified)
19. (Germany) Kathrin Wörle (first round)
20. (Ukraine) Mariya Koryttseva (qualified)
21. (France) Stéphanie Foretz (first round)
22. (Kazakhstan) Sesil Karatantcheva (second round)
23. (France) Camille Pin (qualified)
24. (United States) Shenay Perry (qualified)
25. (United States) Carly Gullickson (qualified)
26. (United States) Julie Ditty (first round)
27. (United States) Angela Haynes (qualifying competition)
28. (Russia) Ekaterina Ivanova (first round)
29. (Croatia) Petra Martić (qualified)
30. (Australia) Anastasia Rodionova (qualified)
31. (Colombia) Mariana Duque Mariño (qualifying competition)
32. (Poland) Marta Domachowska (qualified)

== Qualifiers ==
1. (Chinese Taipei) Chang Kai-chen
2. (Australia) Anastasia Rodionova
3. (Japan) Yurika Sema
4. (Poland) Marta Domachowska
5. (Germany) Angelique Kerber
6. (Australia) Monique Adamczak
7. (Czech Republic) Eva Hrdinová
8. (Croatia) Petra Martić
9. (United States) Shenay Perry
10. (Russia) Vesna Manasieva
11. (United States) Carly Gullickson
12. (Czech Republic) Barbora Záhlavová-Strýcová
13. (Ukraine) Mariya Koryttseva
14. (Canada) Valérie Tétreault
15. (France) Camille Pin
16. (Austria) Yvonne Meusburger

== Qualifying draw ==
=== Key ===
- Q = Qualifier
- WC = Wild card
- LL = Lucky loser
- Alt = Alternate
- ITF = ITF entry
- PR = Protected ranking
- SR = Special ranking
- SE = Special exempt
- JE = Junior exempt
- JR = Junior Accelerator Programme entrant
- CO = College Accelerator Programme entrant
- NG = Next Gen Accelerator Program entrant
- w/o = Walkover
- r = Retired
- d = Defaulted

=== First qualifier ===
First round
Alt	(Kazakhstan) Zarina Diyas	3	0
(Chinese Taipei) Chang Kai-chen	6	6
(Canada) Sharon Fichman	1	7^{7}	6
(Czech Republic) Petra Cetkovská	6	6^{5}	3
(Sweden) Sofia Arvidsson	1	6	6
(Russia) Regina Kulikova	6	3	2
(United States) Abigail Spears	6	1	0
22	(Kazakhstan) Sesil Karatantcheva	0	6	6

Second round
(Chinese Taipei) Chang Kai-chen	6^{7}	6	6
(Canada) Sharon Fichman	7^{9}	3	1
(Sweden) Sofia Arvidsson	6	7
22	(Kazakhstan) Sesil Karatantcheva	4	5

Qualifying competition
(Chinese Taipei) Chang Kai-chen	7	6
(Sweden) Sofia Arvidsson	5	1

=== Second qualifier ===
First round
2	(United Kingdom) Elena Baltacha	6	6
(Argentina) Betina Jozami	1	1
(Czech Republic) Andrea Hlaváčková	7	2	6
(Ukraine) Yuliana Fedak	5	6	1
WC	(United States) Asia Muhammad	6	3	6
(Argentina) Jorgelina Cravero	2	6	0
(Romania) Irina-Camelia Begu	2	5
30	(Australia) Anastasia Rodionova	6	7

Second round
2	(United Kingdom) Elena Baltacha	7	6
(Czech Republic) Andrea Hlaváčková	5	0
WC	(United States) Asia Muhammad	4	4
30	(Australia) Anastasia Rodionova	6	6

Qualifying competition
2	(United Kingdom) Elena Baltacha	6	2	3
30	(Australia) Anastasia Rodionova	4	6	6

=== Third qualifier ===
First round
3	(United Kingdom) Katie O'Brien	6	6
(Austria) Nikola Hofmanova	3	2
(Georgia (country)) Anna Tatishvili	6	6
(Spain) Silvia Soler Espinosa	4	2
PR	(Luxembourg) Anne Kremer	6	5	3
(Japan) Yurika Sema	2	7	6
(Japan) Kimiko Date-Krumm	2	6	6
28	(Russia) Ekaterina Ivanova	6	1	2

Second round
3	(United Kingdom) Katie O'Brien	2	4
(Georgia (country)) Anna Tatishvili	6	6
(Japan) Yurika Sema	7^{7}	3	6
(Japan) Kimiko Date-Krumm	6^{5}	6	4

Qualifying competition
(Georgia (country)) Anna Tatishvili	6	4	2
(Japan) Yurika Sema	4	6	6

=== Fourth qualifier ===
First round
4	(Czech Republic) Sandra Záhlavová	6	6
(Germany) Stephanie Gehrlein	2	3
(Russia) Anastasia Pivovarova	6	6
(Slovakia) Lenka Wienerová	3	3
(France) Yulia Fedossova	5	6	6
WC	(United States) Alison Riske	7	4	2
(United Kingdom) Georgie Stoop	6	1	6^{6}
32	(Poland) Marta Domachowska	1	6	7^{8}

Second round
4	(Czech Republic) Sandra Záhlavová	6^{2}	5
(Russia) Anastasia Pivovarova	7^{7}	7
(France) Yulia Fedossova	4	1
32	(Poland) Marta Domachowska	6	6

Qualifying competition
(Russia) Anastasia Pivovarova	2	1
32	(Poland) Marta Domachowska	6	6

=== Fifth qualifier ===
First round
5	(Germany) Angelique Kerber	6	0	7^{7}
(Ukraine) Yuliya Beygelzimer	2	6	6^{5}
(Japan) Tomoko Yonemura	6^{6}	4
(Ukraine) Tetiana Luzhanska	7^{8}	6
(United States) Lilia Osterloh	6	6
(Colombia) Catalina Castaño	4	1
(South Africa) Chanelle Scheepers	6	6
19	(Germany) Kathrin Wörle	3	2

Second round
5	(Germany) Angelique Kerber	6	5	6
(Ukraine) Tetiana Luzhanska	3	7	3
(United States) Lilia Osterloh	1	2
(South Africa) Chanelle Scheepers	6	6

Qualifying competition
5	(Germany) Angelique Kerber	6	6^{5}	7^{11}
(South Africa) Chanelle Scheepers	1	7^{7}	6^{9}

=== Sixth qualifier ===
First round
6	(Chinese Taipei) Chan Yung-jan	7^{7}	2	6
(Czech Republic) Nicole Vaidišová	6^{1}	6	2
(Italy) Anna Floris	6	6
(Luxembourg) Mandy Minella	4	3
(Italy) Romina Oprandi	5	2
(Australia) Monique Adamczak	7	6
(Japan) Rika Fujiwara	4	3
17	(Russia) Vitalia Diatchenko	6	6

Second round
6	(Chinese Taipei) Chan Yung-jan	7^{8}	6^{4}	7
(Italy) Anna Floris	6^{6}	7^{7}	5
(Australia) Monique Adamczak	3	7	6
17	(Russia) Vitalia Diatchenko	6	5	3

Qualifying competition
6	(Chinese Taipei) Chan Yung-jan	4	4
(Australia) Monique Adamczak	6	6

=== Seventh qualifier ===
First round
7	(Slovakia) Kristína Kučová	4	2
(Russia) Evgeniya Rodina	6	6
(Italy) Corinna Dentoni	4	6^{5}
(Czech Republic) Eva Hrdinová	6	7^{7}
(Hungary) Anikó Kapros	6	6
(Spain) Estrella Cabeza Candela	1	1
WC	(United Kingdom) Laura Robson	7	6
21	(France) Stéphanie Foretz	5	1

Second round
(Russia) Evgeniya Rodina	6^{0}	2
(Czech Republic) Eva Hrdinová	7^{7}	6
(Hungary) Anikó Kapros	4	5
WC	(United Kingdom) Laura Robson	6	7

Qualifying competition
(Czech Republic) Eva Hrdinová	7^{8}	4	7^{7}
WC	(United Kingdom) Laura Robson	6^{6}	6	6^{4}

=== Eighth qualifier ===
First round
8	(Uzbekistan) Akgul Amanmuradova	4	0^{r}
(Ukraine) Olga Savchuk	6	1
(Czech Republic) Zuzana Ondrášková	6	5	4
(Russia) Ksenia Lykina	4	7	6
WC	(United States) Kristie Ahn	7	6
(Italy) Nathalie Viérin	5	1
(Kyrgyzstan) Ksenia Palkina	0	2
29	(Croatia) Petra Martić	6	6

Second round
(Ukraine) Olga Savchuk	6	4	3
(Russia) Ksenia Lykina	2	6	6
WC	(United States) Kristie Ahn	1	2
29	(Croatia) Petra Martić	6	6

Qualifying competition
(Russia) Ksenia Lykina	0	6	1
29	(Croatia) Petra Martić	6	2	6

=== Ninth qualifier ===
First round
9	(France) Pauline Parmentier	6	6
(Bolivia) María Fernanda Álvarez Terán	2	2
WC	(United States) Sloane Stephens	3	2
(Portugal) Neuza Silva	6	6
WC	(United States) Lauren Embree	6	6
WC	(United States) Irina Falconi	4	1
(Georgia (country)) Oksana Kalashnikova	4	3
24	(United States) Shenay Perry	6	6

Second round
9	(France) Pauline Parmentier	6	6
(Portugal) Neuza Silva	2	1
WC	(United States) Lauren Embree	6^{4}	7^{7}	4
24	(United States) Shenay Perry	7^{7}	6^{4}	6

Qualifying competition
9	(France) Pauline Parmentier	4	4
24	(United States) Shenay Perry	6	6

=== Tenth qualifier ===
First round
10	(Spain) Arantxa Parra Santonja	7^{7}	6
(Japan) Junri Namigata	6^{5}	0
(Estonia) Maret Ani	4	6	6
(Spain) Virginia Ruano Pascual	6	2	1
(Canada) Rebecca Marino	6	6
(Spain) Eva Fernández Brugués	4	4
(China) Han Xinyun	1	2
18	(Russia) Vesna Manasieva	6	6

Second round
10	(Spain) Arantxa Parra Santonja	6	7^{7}
(Estonia) Maret Ani	1	6^{4}
(Canada) Rebecca Marino	7^{7}	2	1
18	(Russia) Vesna Manasieva	6^{4}	6	6

Qualifying competition
10	(Spain) Arantxa Parra Santonja	6^{4}	4
18	(Russia) Vesna Manasieva	7^{7}	6

=== Eleventh qualifier ===
First round
11	(Russia) Ekaterina Bychkova	6	6
WC	(United States) CoCo Vandeweghe	0	3
(Serbia) Bojana Jovanovski	6	6
(China) Lu Jingjing	4	2
(Russia) Alexandra Panova	6	3	4
(Slovakia) Zuzana Kučová	3	6	6
(Belarus) Tatiana Poutchek	1	3
25	(United States) Carly Gullickson	6	6

Second round
11	(Russia) Ekaterina Bychkova	3	3
(Serbia) Bojana Jovanovski	6	6
(Slovakia) Zuzana Kučová	6^{6}	2
25	(United States) Carly Gullickson	7^{8}	6

Qualifying competition
(Serbia) Bojana Jovanovski	5	2
25	(United States) Carly Gullickson	7	6

=== Twelfth qualifier ===
First round
12	(Czech Republic) Barbora Záhlavová-Strýcová	6	7^{7}
(Chinese Taipei) Hsieh Su-wei	4	6^{4}
(Slovakia) Lenka Tvarošková	3	7^{7}	2
(Canada) Heidi El Tabakh	6	6^{4}	6
(Japan) Ryoko Fuda	6	7
(Belarus) Darya Kustova	1	5
(Australia) Sophie Ferguson	2	2
31	(Colombia) Mariana Duque Mariño	6	6

Second round
12	(Czech Republic) Barbora Záhlavová-Strýcová	6	6
(Canada) Heidi El Tabakh	0	0
(Japan) Ryoko Fuda	5	5
31	(Colombia) Mariana Duque Mariño	7	7

Qualifying competition
12	(Czech Republic) Barbora Záhlavová-Strýcová	6	4	7^{7}
31	(Colombia) Mariana Duque Mariño	4	6	6^{4}

=== Thirteenth qualifier ===
First round
13	(Czech Republic) Klára Zakopalová	6	6
(Germany) Laura Siegemund	3	4
(France) Stéphanie Cohen-Aloro	7^{7}	6
(United States) Lauren Albanese	6^{5}	2
(Spain) Eloisa Compostizo de Andrés	3	7^{7}	6
(France) Claire Feuerstein	6	6^{3}	3
(Belarus) Ekaterina Dzehalevich	4	2
20	(Ukraine) Mariya Koryttseva	6	6

Second round
13	(Czech Republic) Klára Zakopalová	1	6	6
(France) Stéphanie Cohen-Aloro	6	1	3
(Spain) Eloisa Compostizo de Andrés	2	1
20	(Ukraine) Mariya Koryttseva	6	6

Qualifying competition
13	(Czech Republic) Klára Zakopalová	0	4
20	(Ukraine) Mariya Koryttseva	6	6

=== Fourteenth qualifier ===
First round
14	(Croatia) Karolina Šprem	2	6	6
(Russia) Nina Bratchikova	6	1	3
(Ukraine) Julia Vakulenko	4	6^{5}
(Canada) Valérie Tétreault	6	7^{7}
(Germany) Carmen Klaschka	6	1	3
(Russia) Elena Chalova	3	6	6
(United States) Lindsay Lee-Waters	3	2
27	(United States) Angela Haynes	6	6

Second round
14	(Croatia) Karolina Šprem	4	3
(Canada) Valérie Tétreault	6	6
(Russia) Elena Chalova	4	3
27	(United States) Angela Haynes	6	6

Qualifying competition
(Canada) Valérie Tétreault	6	6^{4}	7
27	(United States) Angela Haynes	4	7^{7}	5

=== Fifteenth qualifier ===
First round
15	(Germany) Julia Schruff	6	6
(Portugal) Frederica Piedade	3	1
(Czech Republic) Renata Voráčová	3	5
(United Kingdom) Melanie South	6	7
(Hungary) Katalin Marosi	7	6
(United States) Nicole Gibbs	5	3
(United States) Madison Brengle	2	5
23	(France) Camille Pin	6	7

Second round
15	(Germany) Julia Schruff	6	5	6
(United Kingdom) Melanie South	4	7	3
(Hungary) Katalin Marosi	6^{4}	2
23	(France) Camille Pin	7^{7}	6

Qualifying competition
15	(Germany) Julia Schruff	3	6^{2}
23	(France) Camille Pin	6	7^{7}

=== Sixteenth qualifier ===
First round
16	(Austria) Yvonne Meusburger	6	6
(Russia) Elena Bovina	2	3
Alt	(Ukraine) Irina Buryachok	4	3
(China) Zhang Shuai	6	6
(Australia) Jessica Moore	2	4
(Lithuania) Lina Stančiūtė	6	6
(Russia) Anna Lapushchenkova	7^{7}	6
26	(United States) Julie Ditty	6^{3}	3

Second round
16	(Austria) Yvonne Meusburger	6	6
(China) Zhang Shuai	1	3
(Lithuania) Lina Stančiūtė	5	6	1
(Russia) Anna Lapushchenkova	7	1	6

Qualifying competition
16	(Austria) Yvonne Meusburger	6	6
(Russia) Anna Lapushchenkova	0	1
