= JT Sundling =

American tennis player (born 1991)

- Full name: John Tyler Sundling
- Country (sports): United States
- Born: January 16, 1991 (age 35) Takoma Park, Maryland
- Height: 6 ft 3 in (191 cm)

Doubles
- Career record: 0–1

Grand Slam doubles results
- US Open: 1R (2009)

John Tyler Sundling (born January 18, 1991) is an American former tennis player.

Sundling was raised in Thousand Oaks, California and earned a top five national ranking in junior tennis. He and Daniel Nguyen won the doubles title at the USTA national championships in 2009, subsequently receiving a wildcard into the doubles main draw of the US Open.

A member of two NCAA championship teams as a player with the USC Trojans, Sundling became head coach of the University of San Francisco men's program in 2020, following two seasons as an assistant.
