= 2009 US Open – Girls' doubles =

Girls' doubles
- 2009 US Open

Final
- Champions: (Russia) Valeriya Solovyeva (Ukraine) Maryna Zanevska
- Runners-up: (Romania) Elena Bogdan (Thailand) Noppawan Lertcheewakarn
- Score: 1–6, 6–3 [10–7]

Events
Singles	men	women		boys	girls
Doubles	men	women	mixed	boys	girls
WC Singles	men	women	quad
WC Doubles	men	women	quad
Legends	men	women	mixed
- US Open

Noppawan Lertcheewakarn and Sandra Roma were the defending champions, but Roma chose not to participate in the Juniors that year.
Lertcheewakarn partnered with Elena Bogdan, but Valeriya Solovyeva and Maryna Zanevska defeated them in the final 1–6, 6–3 [10–7].

== Seeds ==
1. (France) Kristina Mladenovic / (Croatia) Silvia Njirić (first round)
2. (Hungary) Tímea Babos / (Croatia) Ajla Tomljanović (quarterfinals)
3. (Romania) Elena Bogdan / (Thailand) Noppawan Lertcheewakarn (final)
4. (United States) Mallory Burdette / (United States) Sloane Stephens (second round)
5. (Netherlands) Richèl Hogenkamp / (Russia) Ksenia Kirillova (first round)
6. (Russia) Yana Buchina / (United Kingdom) Heather Watson (first round)
7. (Russia) Daria Gavrilova / (Russia) Irina Khromacheva (semifinals)
8. (Norway) Ulrikke Eikeri / (Denmark) Mai Grage (first round)

== Draw ==
Key

- Q = Qualifier
- WC = Wild card
- LL = Lucky loser
- Alt = Alternate
- ITF = ITF entry
- PR = Protected ranking
- SR = Special ranking
- SE = Special exempt
- JE = Junior exempt
- JR = Junior Accelerator Programme entrant
- CO = College Accelerator Programme entrant
- NG = Next Gen Accelerator Program entrant
- w/o = Walkover
- r = Retired
- d = Defaulted

=== Finals ===
Semifinals
(Slovakia) Jana Čepelová (Slovakia) Chantal Škamlová	4	1
3	(Romania) Elena Bogdan (Thailand) Noppawan Lertcheewakarn	6	6
7	(Russia) Daria Gavrilova (Russia) Irina Khromacheva	6	3	[8]
(Russia) Valeriya Solovyeva (Ukraine) Maryna Zanevska	1	6	[10]

Final
3	(Romania) Elena Bogdan (Thailand) Noppawan Lertcheewakarn	6	3	[7]
(Russia) Valeriya Solovyeva (Ukraine) Maryna Zanevska	1	6	[10]

=== Top half ===
First round
1	(France) K Mladenovic (Croatia) S Njirić	7	3	[5]
(Slovakia) J Čepelová (Slovakia) C Škamlová	5	6	[10]
(Russia) P Leykina (Russia) AA Marenko	1	5
(United Kingdom) S Cornish (Canada) K Paliivets	6	7
(United States) K Ahn (United States) G Min	5	7	[10]
(Chinese Taipei) T-F Juan (Japan) E Mutaguchi	7	5	[4]
(Poland) P Kania (Poland) M Linette	6	6
5	(Netherlands) R Hogenkamp (Russia) K Kirillova	2	1
3	(Romania) E Bogdan (Thailand) N Lertcheewakarn	6	6
(Germany) A-L Friedsam (Germany) S Haas	3	4
(Paraguay) V Cepede Royg (Hungary) Zs Susányi	6	4	[10]
(United States) B Capra (United States) C Dolehide	3	6	[8]
(United States) B Bolender (United States) L Herring	6^{3}	4
(Serbia) T Čurović (Russia) Y Putintseva	7	3	r
(Tunisia) O Jabeur (China) S Zheng	0	6	[10]
6	(Russia) Y Buchina (United Kingdom) H Watson	6	3	[8]

Second round
(Slovakia) J Čepelová (Slovakia) C Škamlová	6	0	[10]
(United Kingdom) S Cornish (Canada) K Paliivets	4	6	[5]
(United States) K Ahn (United States) G Min	3	7	[10]
(Poland) P Kania (Poland) M Linette	6	5	[7]
3	(Romania) E Bogdan (Thailand) N Lertcheewakarn	6	6
(Paraguay) V Cepede Royg (Hungary) Zs Susányi	2	4
(United States) B Bolender (United States) L Herring	2	6	[10]
(Tunisia) O Jabeur (China) S Zheng	6	2	[5]

Quarterfinals
(Slovakia) J Čepelová (Slovakia) C Škamlová	7	3	[11]
(United States) K Ahn (United States) G Min	6^{3}	6	[9]
3	(Romania) E Bogdan (Thailand) N Lertcheewakarn	6	3	[10]
(United States) B Bolender (United States) L Herring	4	6	[2]

Semifinals
(Slovakia) J Čepelová (Slovakia) C Škamlová	4	1
3	(Romania) E Bogdan (Thailand) N Lertcheewakarn	6	6

=== Bottom half ===
First round
7	(Russia) D Gavrilova (Russia) I Khromacheva	1	6	[10]
(United States) G Brodsky (United States) A Muhammad	6	4	[5]
(Belarus) P Pekhova (Ukraine) E Svitolina	3	0
(Romania) C Dinu (Indonesia) GS Ysidora	6	6
(Belarus) A Orlik (United Kingdom) L Robson	6	3	[5]
(Japan) M Inoue (Japan) R Ozaki	2	6	[10]
(Germany) A Beck (Greece) D Papamichail	4	2
4	(United States) M Burdette (United States) S Stephens	6	6
8	(Norway) U Eikeri (Denmark) M Grage	1	2
(Russia) V Solovieva (Ukraine) M Zanevska	6	6
(Thailand) L Kumkhum (Japan) A Omae	6	4	[6]
(United States) A Cercone (United States) N Scott	3	6	[10]
(Canada) G Dabrowski (Argentina) P Ormaechea	3	2
(United States) J Cako (United States) N Gibbs	6	6
(Oman) F Al-Nabhani (Belarus) N Pintusova	3	2
2	(Hungary) T Babos (Croatia) A Tomljanovic	6	6

Second round
7	(Russia) D Gavrilova (Russia) I Khromacheva	6	6
(Romania) C Dinu (Indonesia) GS Ysidora	3	4
(Japan) M Inoue (Japan) R Ozaki	7	6
4	(United States) M Burdette (United States) S Stephens	5	4
(Russia) V Solovieva (Ukraine) M Zanevska	6	6
(United States) A Cercone (United States) N Scott	3	3
(United States) J Cako (United States) N Gibbs	4	3
2	(Hungary) T Babos (Croatia) A Tomljanovic	6	6

Quarterfinals
7	(Russia) D Gavrilova (Russia) I Khromacheva	6	7
(Japan) M Inoue (Japan) R Ozaki	1	5
(Russia) V Solovieva (Ukraine) M Zanevska	4	6	[10]
2	(Hungary) T Babos (Croatia) A Tomljanovic	6	1	[4]

Semifinals
7	(Russia) D Gavrilova (Russia) I Khromacheva	6	3	[8]
(Russia) V Solovieva (Ukraine) M Zanevska	1	6	[10]
