= 2009 US Open – Boys' doubles =

Boys' doubles
- 2009 US Open

Final
- Champions: (Hungary) Márton Fucsovics (Chinese Taipei) Hsieh Cheng-peng
- Runners-up: (France) Julien Obry (France) Adrien Puget
- Score: 7–6^{(7–5)}, 5–7, [10–1]

Events
Singles	men	women		boys	girls
Doubles	men	women	mixed	boys	girls
WC Singles	men	women	quad
WC Doubles	men	women	quad
Legends	men	women	mixed
- US Open

Niki Moser and Cedrik-Marcel Stebe were the defending champions, but they did not compete in the Juniors this year.

Márton Fucsovics and Hsieh Cheng-peng won in the finals 7–6^{(7–5)}, 5–7, [10–1] against Julien Obry and Adrien Puget.

== Seeds ==
1. (India) Yuki Bhambri / (Chinese Taipei) Huang Liang-chi (first round)
2. (Argentina) Facundo Arguello / (Argentina) Agustín Velotti (semifinals)
3. (Philippines) Francis Casey Alcantara / (Sweden) Daniel Berta (first round)
4. (South Korea) Jeong Suk-young / (South Korea) Lim Yong-kyu (first round)
5. (Argentina) Andrea Collarini / (South Africa) Nikala Scholtz (first round)
6. (France) Pierre-Hugues Herbert / (Germany) Kevin Krawietz (quarterfinals)
7. (Japan) Hiroyasu Ehara / (Japan) Shuichi Sekiguchi (first round)
8. (Belgium) Arthur De Greef / (France) Gianni Mina (first round)

== Draw ==
Key

- Q = Qualifier
- WC = Wild card
- LL = Lucky loser
- Alt = Alternate
- ITF = ITF entry
- PR = Protected ranking
- SR = Special ranking
- SE = Special exempt
- JE = Junior exempt
- JR = Junior Accelerator Programme entrant
- CO = College Accelerator Programme entrant
- NG = Next Gen Accelerator Program entrant
- w/o = Walkover
- r = Retired
- d = Defaulted

=== Finals ===
Semifinals
(France) Julien Obry (France) Adrien Puget	6	6^{8}	[10]
WC	(United States) Matthew Kandath (United States) Jack Sock	4	7	[5]
(Hungary) Márton Fucsovics (Chinese Taipei) Hsieh Cheng-peng	6	6
2	(Argentina) Facundo Arguello (Argentina) Agustín Velotti	3	2

Final
(France) Julien Obry (France) Adrien Puget	6^{5}	7	[1]
(Hungary) Márton Fucsovics (Chinese Taipei) Hsieh Cheng-peng	7	5	[10]

=== Top half ===
First round
1	(India) Yuki Bhambri (Chinese Taipei) Huang Liang-chi	6	2	[6]
(United States) Evan King (United States) Denis Kudla	3	6	[10]
(New Zealand) Sebastian Lavie (Argentina) Renzo Olivo	6	4	[11]
(Italy) Federico Gaio (Japan) Yasutaka Uchiyama	0	6	[9]
(France) Julien Obry (France) Adrien Puget	1	6	[10]
WC	(United States) Sekou Bangoura (United States) Nathan Pasha	6	4	[1]
(Ukraine) Stanislav Poplavskyy (Czech Republic) Radim Urbánek	6	6^{3}	[10]
5	(Argentina) Andrea Collarini (South Africa) Nikala Scholtz	4	7	[7]
4	(South Korea) Jeong Suk-young (South Korea) Lim Yong-kyu	4	4
WC	(United States) Matthew Kandath (United States) Jack Sock	6	6
(Slovakia) Filip Horanský (Slovakia) Jozef Kovalík	5	3
(United Kingdom) Ahmed El Menshawy (United States) Harry Fowler	7	6
(Russia) Mikhail Biryukov (Canada) Pavel Krainik	6	2	[3]
(United States) Mitchell Frank (United States) Junior Ore	1	6	[10]
(Switzerland) Sandro Ehrat (Greece) Alexandros Georgoudas	7	4	[10]
8	(Belgium) Arthur De Greef (France) Gianni Mina	6^{8}	6	[3]

Second round
(United States) E King (United States) D Kudla	4	6	[9]
(New Zealand) S Lavie (Argentina) R Olivo	6	3	[11]
(France) J Obry (France) A Puget	6	4	[10]
(Ukraine) S Poplavskyy (Czech Republic) R Urbánek	3	6	[8]
WC	(United States) M Kandath (United States) J Sock	6	7
(United Kingdom) A El Menshawy (United States) H Fowler	4	5
(United States) M Frank (United States) J Ore	6^{3}	6	[7]
(Switzerland) S Ehrat (Greece) A Georgoudas	7	4	[10]

Quarterfinals
(New Zealand) S Lavie (Argentina) R Olivo	1	6	6
(France) J Obry (France) A Puget	6	3	[10]
WC	(United States) M Kandath (United States) J Sock	7	7
(Switzerland) S Ehrat (Greece) A Georgoudas	6^{7}	5

Semifinals
(France) J Obry (France) A Puget	6	6^{6}	[10]
WC	(United States) M Kandath (United States) J Sock	4	7	[5]

=== Bottom half ===
First round
6	(France) Pierre-Hugues Herbert (Germany) Kevin Krawietz	7	7
(Finland) Micke Kontinen (Finland) Henri Laaksonen	6^{5}	5
WC	(United States) Raymond Sarmiento (United States) Johannes Robert Van Overbeek	3	4
(Brazil) Guilherme Clézar (Brazil) Tiago Fernandes	6	6
(Republic of Ireland) John Morrissey (India) Sudanwa Sitaram	4	6	[10]
WC	(United States) Gonzales Austin (United States) Bjorn Fratangelo	6	3	[5]
(Hungary) Márton Fucsovics (Chinese Taipei) Hsieh Cheng-peng	6	6
3	(Philippines) Francis Casey Alcantara (Sweden) Daniel Berta	4	3
7	(Japan) Hiroyasu Ehara (Japan) Shuichi Sekiguchi	4	6	[8]
(Austria) Maximilian Neuchrist (Austria) Tristan-Samuel Weissborn	6	4	[10]
(Germany) Richard Becker (Peru) Duilio Beretta	6^{5}	6^{6}
(United States) Jordan Cox (United States) Tennys Sandgren	7	7
(Brazil) José Pereira (Guatemala) Julen Uriguen	4	6^{4}
(Sweden) Patrik Brydolf (Germany) Dominik Schulz	6	7
(Sweden) Tobias Blomgren (United Kingdom) Oliver Golding	4	6^{8}
2	(Argentina) Facundo Arguello (Argentina) Agustín Velotti	6	7

Second round
6	(France) P-H Herbert (Germany) K Krawietz	6	6
(Brazil) G Clézar (Brazil) T Fernandes	2	4
(Republic of Ireland) J Morrissey (India) S Sitaram	6	3	[4]
(Hungary) M Fucsovics (Chinese Taipei) C-p Hsieh	4	6	[10]
(Austria) M Neuchrist (Austria) T-S Weissborn	7	6^{16}	[4]
(United States) J Cox (United States) T Sandgren	5	7	[10]
(Sweden) P Brydolf (Germany) D Schulz	6^{5}	6^{5}
2	(Argentina) F Arguello (Argentina) A Velotti	7	7

Quarterfinals
6	(France) P-H Herbert (Germany) K Krawietz	0	6^{2}
(Hungary) M Fucsovics (Chinese Taipei) C-p Hsieh	6	7
(United States) J Cox (United States) T Sandgren	5	4
2	(Argentina) F Arguello (Argentina) A Velotti	7	6

Semifinals
(Hungary) M Fucsovics (Chinese Taipei) C-p Hsieh	6	6
2	(Argentina) F Arguello (Argentina) A Velotti	3	2
