= 2009 US Open – Girls' singles =

Girls' singles
- 2009 US Open

Final
- Champion: (United Kingdom) Heather Watson
- Runner-up: (Russia) Yana Buchina
- Score: 6–4, 6–1

Events
Singles	men	women		boys	girls
Doubles	men	women	mixed	boys	girls
WC Singles	men	women	quad
WC Doubles	men	women	quad
Legends	men	women	mixed
- US Open

The United States Open Tennis Championships is a hardcourt tennis tournament held annually at Flushing Meadows, starting on the last Monday in August and lasting for two weeks. The tournament consists of five main championship events: men's and women's singles, men's and women's doubles, and mixed doubles, with additional tournaments for seniors, juniors, and wheelchair players.

In 2009, the girls' singles event was won by Heather Watson of the United Kingdom who beat Yana Buchina of Russia, 6–4, 6–1 in the final.

== Seeds ==
1. (France) Kristina Mladenovic (first round)
2. (Thailand) Noppawan Lertcheewakarn (quarterfinals)
3. (Hungary) Tímea Babos (second round)
4. (United States) Sloane Stephens (third round)
5. (Croatia) Ajla Tomljanović (second round)
6. (Croatia) Silvia Njirić (third round)
7. (United States) Lauren Embree (second round)
8. (United States) Christina McHale (withdrew)
9. (Russia) Daria Gavrilova (semifinals)
10. (Netherlands) Richèl Hogenkamp (third round)
11. (United Kingdom) Heather Watson (champion)
12. (Belgium) Tamaryn Hendler (third round)
13. (Japan) Miyabi Inoue (first round)
14. (Slovakia) Jana Čepelová (quarterfinals)
15. (Norway) Ulrikke Eikeri (third round)
16. (United States) Beatrice Capra (quarterfinals)

== Draw ==
Key

- Q = Qualifier
- WC = Wild card
- LL = Lucky loser
- Alt = Alternate
- ITF = ITF entry
- PR = Protected ranking
- SR = Special ranking
- SE = Special exempt
- JE = Junior exempt
- JR = Junior Accelerator Programme entrant
- CO = College Accelerator Programme entrant
- NG = Next Gen Accelerator Program entrant
- w/o = Walkover
- r = Retired
- d = Defaulted

=== Finals ===
Quarterfinals
16	(United States) Beatrice Capra	4	6	4
(Russia) Yana Buchina	6	2	6
WC	(United States) Lauren Davis	2	3
(United Kingdom) Laura Robson	6	6
9	(Russia) Daria Gavrilova	6	6
14	(Slovakia) Jana Čepelová	4	4
11	(United Kingdom) Heather Watson	6	6
2	(Thailand) Noppawan Lertcheewakarn	2	1

Semifinals
(Russia) Yana Buchina	1	6	7
(United Kingdom) Laura Robson	6	3	5
9	(Russia) Daria Gavrilova	3	0
11	(United Kingdom) Heather Watson	6	6

Final
(Russia) Yana Buchina	4	1
11	(United Kingdom) Heather Watson	6	6

=== Top half ===
==== Section 1 ====
First round
1	(France) Kristina Mladenovic	1	4
WC	(United States) Asia Muhammad	6	6
WC	(United States) Gail Brodsky	7	7
(Paraguay) Verónica Cepede Royg	5	5
SE	(Canada) Gabriela Dabrowski	2	4
(Belarus) Anna Orlik	6	6
Q	(Russia) Anna Arina Marenko	3	2
16	(United States) Beatrice Capra	6	6
10	(Netherlands) Richèl Hogenkamp	6	6^{5}	6
(Argentina) Paula Ormaechea	2	7^{7}	2
WC	(United States) Grace Min	6	6
Q	(Chinese Taipei) Juan Ting-fei	4	2
(United Kingdom) Stephanie Cornish	4	6^{5}
(Russia) Yana Buchina	6	7^{7}
WC	(United States) Alexandra Cercone	1	3
5	(Croatia) Ajla Tomljanović	6	6

Second round
WC	(United States) A Muhammad	6	6
WC	(United States) G Brodsky	3	4
(Belarus) A Orlik	7	4	3
16	(United States) B Capra	5	6	6
10	(Netherlands) R Hogenkamp	6	6
WC	(United States) G Min	1	4
(Russia) Y Buchina	3	6	6
5	(Croatia) A Tomljanović	6	3	3

Third round
WC	(United States) A Muhammad	6	1	1
16	(United States) B Capra	3	6	6
10	(Netherlands) R Hogenkamp	5	0
(Russia) Y Buchina	7	6

Quarterfinals
16	(United States) B Capra	4	6	4
(Russia) Y Buchina	6	2	6

==== Section 2 ====
First round
3	(Hungary) Tímea Babos	6	6
(Ukraine) Elina Svitolina	3	4
(Russia) Irina Khromacheva	4	4
WC	(United States) Lauren Davis	6	6
Q	(Thailand) Luksika Kumkhum	4	6	7
WC	(United States) Ester Goldfeld	6	0	5
(Romania) Elena Bogdan	6	6
13	(Japan) Miyabi Inoue	0	0
12	(Belgium) Tamaryn Hendler	6	6
WC	(United States) Jacqueline Cako	4	2
(Germany) Anna-Lena Friedsam	4	4
(Russia) Yulia Putintseva	6	6
(United Kingdom) Laura Robson	6	6
(Tunisia) Ons Jabeur	0	1
Q	(Poland) Paula Kania	5	2
7	(United States) Lauren Embree	7	6

Second round
3	(Hungary) T Babos	6	6^{3}	4
WC	(United States) L Davis	1	7	6
Q	(Thailand) L Kumkhum	5	5
(Romania) E Bogdan	7	7
12	(Belgium) T Hendler	6	6
(Russia) Y Putintseva	4	4
(United Kingdom) L Robson	4	6	6
7	(United States) L Embree	6	1	4

Third round
WC	(United States) L Davis	6	2	7
(Romania) E Bogdan	2	6	5
12	(Belgium) T Hendler	2	1
(United Kingdom) L Robson	6	6

Quarterfinals
WC	(United States) L Davis	2	3
(United Kingdom) L Robson	6	6

=== Bottom half ===
==== Section 3 ====
First round
6	(Croatia) Silvia Njirić	6	7
(Serbia) Tamara Čurović	4	5
Q	(United States) Noel Scott	4	0
(Hungary) Zsófia Susányi	6	6
(Mexico) Alejandra Granillo	4	2
(Indonesia) Grace Sari Ysidora	6	6
(United States) Mallory Burdette	6	2	3
9	(Russia) Daria Gavrilova	2	6	6
14	(Slovakia) Jana Čepelová	6	7
(Canada) Katarena Paliivets	3	5
(China) Zheng Saisai	3	7^{7}	1
WC	(United States) Julia Boserup	6	6^{5}	6
Q	(Japan) Akiko Omae	3	6	3
(Ukraine) Maryna Zanevska	6	4	6
(Russia) Polina Leykina	4	2
4	(United States) Sloane Stephens	6	6

Second round
6	(Croatia) S Njirić	6^{3}	6	7^{7}
(Hungary) Zs Susányi	7^{7}	4	6^{3}
(Indonesia) GS Ysidora	1	6^{3}
9	(Russia) D Gavrilova	6	7^{7}
14	(Slovakia) J Čepelová	6	6
WC	(United States) J Boserup	4	3
(Ukraine) M Zanevska	6^{4}	6	2
4	(United States) S Stephens	7^{7}	3	6

Third round
6	(Croatia) S Njirić	4	6
9	(Russia) D Gavrilova	6	7
14	(Slovakia) J Čepelová	4	6	6
4	(United States) S Stephens	6	1	0

Quarterfinals
9	(Russia) D Gavrilova	6	6
14	(Slovakia) J Čepelová	4	4

==== Section 4 ====
First round
LL	(Germany) Annika Beck	6	6^{6}	6
(Oman) Fatma Al-Nabhani	3	7^{8}	1
Q	(Japan) Risa Ozaki	6	6^{4}	2
(Denmark) Mai Grage	3	7^{7}	6
Q	(United States) Courtney Dolehide	6	4	6
(Romania) Cristina Dinu	0	6	4
(Russia) Ksenia Kirillova	2	7^{7}	1
11	(United Kingdom) Heather Watson	6	6^{5}	6
15	(Norway) Ulrikke Eikeri	6	6
(Belarus) Nataliya Pintusova	2	1
(United States) Nicole Gibbs	6	6
(Poland) Magda Linette	4	1
(Russia) Valeriya Solovyeva	5	6	6
(United States) Kristie Ahn	7	2	4
(Germany) Sina Haas	4	1
2	(Thailand) Noppawan Lertcheewakarn	6	6

Second round
LL	(Germany) A Beck	6	6
(Denmark) M Grage	3	3
Q	(United States) C Dolehide	3	2
11	(United Kingdom) H Watson	6	6
15	(Norway) U Eikeri	6	7^{7}
(United States) N Gibbs	3	6^{3}
(Russia) V Solovyeva	6	4	6^{4}
2	(Thailand) N Lertcheewakarn	2	6	7^{7}

Third round
LL	(Germany) A Beck	4	5
11	(United Kingdom) H Watson	6	7
15	(Norway) U Eikeri	2	6	1
2	(Thailand) N Lertcheewakarn	6	3	6

Quarterfinals
11	(United Kingdom) H Watson	6	6
2	(Thailand) N Lertcheewakarn	2	1
