= 2009 US Open – Boys' singles =

Boys' singles
- 2009 US Open

Final
- Champion: (Australia) Bernard Tomic
- Runner-up: (United States) Chase Buchanan
- Score: 6–1, 6–3

Events
Singles	men	women		boys	girls
Doubles	men	women	mixed	boys	girls
WC Singles	men	women	quad
WC Doubles	men	women	quad
Legends	men	women	mixed
- US Open

Grigor Dimitrov was the defending champion, but did not compete in the Juniors this year.

Bernard Tomic won in the final 6–1, 6–3 against Chase Buchanan.

== Seeds ==
1. (India) Yuki Bhambri (quarterfinals)
2. (Sweden) Daniel Berta (first round)
3. (Australia) Bernard Tomic (champion)
4. (Chinese Taipei) Huang Liang-chi (first round)
5. (Argentina) Agustín Velotti (first round)
6. (South Korea) Lim Young-kyu (second round)
7. (Argentina) Andrea Collarini (third round)
8. (France) Gianni Mina (semifinals)
9. (Japan) Shuichi Sekiguchi (first round)
10. (Argentina) Facundo Argüello (first round)
11. (Germany) Kevin Krawietz (first round)
12. (France) Julien Obry (second round)
13. (Guatemala) Julen Urigüen (first round)
14. (Venezuela) David Souto (first round)
15. (Germany) Dominik Schulz (second round)
16. (United States) Denis Kudla (quarterfinals)

== Draw ==
Key

- Q = Qualifier
- WC = Wild card
- LL = Lucky loser
- Alt = Alternate
- ITF = ITF entry
- PR = Protected ranking
- SR = Special ranking
- SE = Special exempt
- JE = Junior exempt
- JR = Junior Accelerator Programme entrant
- CO = College Accelerator Programme entrant
- NG = Next Gen Accelerator Program entrant
- w/o = Walkover
- r = Retired
- d = Defaulted

=== Finals ===
Quarterfinals
1	(India) Yuki Bhambri	3	6^{4}
WC	(United States) Chase Buchanan	6	7
16	(United States) Denis Kudla	6	6	3
8	(France) Gianni Mina	2	7	6
(Brazil) Tiago Fernandes	1	4
3	(Australia) Bernard Tomic	6	6
(France) Pierre-Hugues Herbert	6	4	6
WC	(United States) Raymond Sarmiento	2	6	2

Semifinals
WC	(United States) Chase Buchanan	6	6
8	(France) Gianni Mina	3	3
3	(Australia) Bernard Tomic	6	7
(France) Pierre-Hugues Herbert	1	6^{5}

Final
WC	(United States) Chase Buchanan	1	3
3	(Australia) Bernard Tomic	6	6

=== Top half ===
==== Section 1 ====
First round
1	(India) Yuki Bhambri	6	6
(United States) Jordan Cox	2	1
(Sweden) Patrik Brydolf	2	4
(Switzerland) Sandro Ehrat	6	6
WC	(United States) Johannes Robert Van Overbeek	4	3
(Ukraine) Stanislav Poplavskyy	6	6
WC	(United States) Jack Sock	4	6	6
14	(Venezuela) David Souto	6	1	4
11	(Germany) Kevin Krawietz	6	1	5
WC	(United States) Chase Buchanan	3	6	7
(Japan) Hiroyasu Ehara	7	6
(France) Adrien Puget	5	1
(Brazil) Guilherme Clezar	3	4
(Hungary) Márton Fucsovics	6	6
(United States) Evan King	7	6
5	(Argentina) Agustín Velotti	6^{4}	4

Second round
1	(India) Y Bhambri	6	6
(Switzerland) S Ehrat	0	1
(Ukraine) S Poplavskyy	1	4
WC	(United States) J Sock	6	6
WC	(United States) C Buchanan	6	6
(Japan) H Ehara	4	4
(Hungary) M Fucsovics	6	6
(United States) E King	2	3

Third round
1	(India) Y Bhambri	6	6
WC	(United States) J Sock	4	3
WC	(United States) C Buchanan	6	6
(Hungary) M Fucsovics	2	3

Quarterfinals
1	(India) Y Bhambri	3	6^{4}
WC	(United States) C Buchanan	6	7

==== Section 2 ====
First round
4	(Chinese Taipei) Huang Liang-chi	6^{4}	6^{4}
SE	(United States) Matthew Kandath	7	7
(South Africa) Nikala Scholtz	6^{7}	6	4
(Belgium) Arthur De Greef	7	4	6
Q	(Russia) Mikhail Biryukov	1	6	6
(Germany) Richard Becker	6	3	3
(Czech Republic) Radim Urbánek	3	5
16	(United States) Denis Kudla	6	7
10	(Argentina) Facundo Argüello	3	6	2
Q	(Sweden) Christian Lindell	6	3	6
WC	(United States) Shane Vinsant	1	1
Q	(South Korea) Jeong Suk-young	6	6
(Slovakia) Jozef Kovalík	6	7
(United States) Harry Fowler	4	6^{5}
Q	(Japan) Yasutaka Uchiyama	4	4
8	(France) Gianni Mina	6	6

Second round
SE	(United States) M Kandath	3	6	4
(Belgium) A De Greef	6	4	6
Q	(Russia) M Biryukov	5	3
16	(United States) D Kudla	7	6
Q	(Sweden) C Lindell	4	6	6
Q	(South Korea) S-y Jeong	6	3	2
(Slovakia) J Kovalík	7	2	4
8	(France) G Mina	5	6	6

Third round
(Belgium) A De Greef	6	3	4
16	(United States) D Kudla	4	6	6
Q	(Sweden) C Lindell	6^{6}	4
8	(France) G Mina	7	6

Quarterfinals
16	(United States) D Kudla	6	6	3
8	(France) G Mina	2	7	6

=== Bottom half ===
==== Section 3 ====
First round
7	(Argentina) Andrea Collarini	6	6
WC	(United States) Gonzales Austin	1	3
(United States) Mitchell Frank	6	5	1
(Italy) Federico Gaio	2	7	6
WC	(United States) Dennis Novikov	2	1
(Brazil) Tiago Fernandes	6	6
(Peru) Duilio Beretta	6^{6}	3
12	(France) Julien Obry	7	6
15	(Germany) Dominik Schulz	6	6
(Philippines) Francis Casey Alcantara	3	4
Q	(Sweden) Tobias Blomgren	6	6
WC	(United States) Bjorn Fratangelo	4	4
(United States) Alexander Domijan	6	3	7
Q	(India) Sudanwa Sitaram	3	6	5
(Finland) Henri Laaksonen	4	3
3	(Australia) Bernard Tomic	6	6

Second round
7	(Argentina) A Collarini	6	6
(Italy) F Gaio	4	3
(Brazil) T Fernandes	2	6	6
12	(France) J Obry	6	4	3
15	(Germany) D Schulz	4	6	3
Q	(Sweden) T Blomgren	6	3	6
(United States) A Domijan	6	5	1
3	(Australia) B Tomic	4	7	6

Third round
7	(Argentina) A Collarini	4	5
(Brazil) T Fernandes	6	7
Q	(Sweden) T Blomgren	6	1	2
3	(Australia) B Tomic	4	6	6

Quarterfinals
(Brazil) T Fernandes	1	4
3	(Australia) B Tomic	6	6

==== Section 4 ====
First round
6	(South Korea) Lim Yong-kyu	6	6
Q	(Austria) Maximilian Neuchrist	2	4
(Brazil) José Pereira	2	6	6
(United States) Junior Ore	6	4	1
(Greece) Alexandros Georgoudas	6	3	6
Q	(United States) Sekou Bangoura	4	6	0
(France) Pierre-Hugues Herbert	3	6	6
9	(Japan) Shuichi Sekiguchi	6	3	2
13	(Guatemala) Julen Urigüen	3	3
(Slovakia) Filip Horanský	6	6
WC	(United States) Raymond Sarmiento	7	6
(Chinese Taipei) Hsieh Cheng-peng	5	3
(Argentina) Renzo Olivo	5	1
(New Zealand) Sebastian Lavie	7	6
(United States) Tennys Sandgren	4	6	7
2	(Sweden) Daniel Berta	6	3	6^{5}

Second round
6	(South Korea) Y-k Lim	6	3	6^{5}
(Brazil) J Pereira	2	6	7
(Greece) A Georgoudas	2	4
(France) P-H Herbert	6	6
(Slovakia) F Horanský	6^{2}	1
WC	(United States) R Sarmiento	7	6
(New Zealand) S Lavie	7	7
(United States) T Sandgren	6^{4}	6^{5}

Third round
(Brazil) J Pereira	7	6^{1}	4
(France) P-H Herbert	5	7	6
WC	(United States) R Sarmiento	7	2	6
(New Zealand) S Lavie	6	6	1

Quarterfinals
(France) P-H Herbert	6	4	6
WC	(United States) R Sarmiento	2	6	2
