= Courtney Dolehide =

American tennis player

- Full name: Courtney Bernadette Dolehide
- Country (sports): United States
- Born: March 25, 1992 (age 32); Hinsdale, Illinois, U.S.
- Height: 6 ft 0 in (183 cm)
- Prize money: $13,786

Singles
- Career record: 15–22
- Highest ranking: No. 453 (June 7, 2010)

Doubles
- Career record: 9–12
- Highest ranking: No. 486 (July 12, 2010)

Grand Slam doubles results
- US Open: 1R (2009)

Courtney Bernadette Dolehide (born March 25, 1992) is an American former professional tennis player.

Dolehide was raised in Hinsdale, a suburb of Chicago, where she attended Hinsdale Central High School.

While still a high school senior she received a wildcard to compete in the doubles main draw of the 2009 US Open (with Kristie Ahn), following a runner-up finish at the USTA Girls' 18 national hardcourt doubles championships. The pair fell in the first round to eighth seeds Bethanie Mattek-Sands and Nadia Petrova.

From 2009 to 2010 she featured on the professional tour and reached a highest singles ranking of 453 in the world. She had a win over top-100 player Patricia Mayr of Austria and was a finalist at an ITF tournament in Wichita.

Dolehide went to UCLA on a scholarship and in 2012 earned All-American honors for doubles. She was team captain of the Bruins when they claimed the 2014 NCAA championship.

Her younger sister Caroline is also a tennis player and she has a cousin, Tom Gorzelanny, who played Major League Baseball.

== ITF finals ==
=== Singles: 1 (0–1) ===
Outcome	No.	Date	Tournament	Surface	Opponent	Score
Runner-up	1.	June 28, 2009	Wichita, United States	Hard	(United States) Jacqueline Cako	2–6, 3–6

=== Doubles: 1 (0–1) ===
Outcome	No.	Date	Tournament	Surface	Partner	Opponents	Score
Runner-up	1.	July 27, 2008	Evansville, United States	Hard	(United States) Kirsten Flower	(Canada) Rebecca Marino (United States) Ellah Nze	5–7, 3–6
