= 2009 US Open – Wheelchair men's doubles =

Wheelchair men's doubles
- 2009 US Open

Final
- Champion: (France) Stéphane Houdet (Sweden) Stefan Olsson
- Runner-up: (Netherlands) Maikel Scheffers (Netherlands) Ronald Vink
- Score: 6–4, 4–6, 6–4

Events
Singles	men	women		boys	girls
Doubles	men	women	mixed	boys	girls
WC Singles	men	women	quad
WC Doubles	men	women	quad
Legends	men	women	mixed
← 2007 ·	US Open	· 2010 →

Stéphane Houdet and Stefan Olsson defeated Maikel Scheffers and Ronald Vink in the final, 6–4, 4–6, 6–4 to win the men's doubles wheelchair tennis title at the 2009 US Open.

Shingo Kunieda and Satoshi Saida were the reigning champions from when the event was last held in 2007, but Saida did not participate. Kunieda partnered Robin Ammerlaan, but was defeated by Houdet and Olsson in the semifinals.

The event was not held in 2008 due to a schedule conflict with the 2008 Summer Paralympics, an issue that would continue to affect US Open wheelchair tennis until 2021.

== Seeds ==
1. (France) Stéphane Houdet / (Sweden) Stefan Olsson (champions)
2. (Netherlands) Maikel Scheffers / (Netherlands) Ronald Vink (final)

== Doubles ==
=== Key ===
- Q = Qualifier
- WC = Wild card
- LL = Lucky loser
- Alt = Alternate
- ITF = ITF entry
- PR = Protected ranking
- SR = Special ranking
- SE = Special exempt
- JE = Junior exempt
- JR = Junior Accelerator Programme entrant
- CO = College Accelerator Programme entrant
- NG = Next Gen Accelerator Program entrant
- w/o = Walkover
- r = Retired
- d = Defaulted

=== Finals ===
First round
1	(France) Stéphane Houdet (Sweden) Stefan Olsson	7	3	4
(Netherlands) Robin Ammerlaan (Japan) Shingo Kunieda	5	6	2r
(Austria) Martin Legner (France) Nicolas Peifer	4	6	3
2	(Netherlands) Maikel Scheffers (Netherlands) Ronald Vink	6	3	6

Finals
1	(France) Stéphane Houdet (Sweden) Stefan Olsson	6	4	6
2	(Netherlands) Maikel Scheffers (Netherlands) Ronald Vink	4	6	4
