= 2009 US Open – Wheelchair men's singles =

Wheelchair men's singles
- 2009 US Open

Final
- Champion: (Japan) Shingo Kunieda
- Runner-up: (Netherlands) Maikel Scheffers
- Score: 6–0, 6–0

Events
Singles	men	women		boys	girls
Doubles	men	women	mixed	boys	girls
WC Singles	men	women	quad
WC Doubles	men	women	quad
Legends	men	women	mixed
← 2007 ·	US Open	· 2010 →

Defending champion Shingo Kunieda defeated Maikel Scheffers in the final, 6–0, 6–0 to win the men's singles wheelchair tennis title at the 2009 US Open. It was his second US Open singles title and eighth major singles title overall, and he dropped just four games en route.

There was no edition of the event in 2008 due to a scheduling conflict with the 2008 Summer Paralympics. This issue would continue to affect US Open wheelchair tennis until 2021.

== Seeds ==
1. (Japan) Shingo Kunieda (champion)
2. (France) Stéphane Houdet (quarterfinals)

== Draw ==
=== Key ===
- Q = Qualifier
- WC = Wild card
- LL = Lucky loser
- Alt = Alternate
- ITF = ITF entry
- PR = Protected ranking
- SR = Special ranking
- SE = Special exempt
- JE = Junior exempt
- JR = Junior Accelerator Programme entrant
- CO = College Accelerator Programme entrant
- NG = Next Gen Accelerator Program entrant
- w/o = Walkover
- r = Retired
- d = Defaulted

=== Finals ===
Quarterfinals
1	(Japan) Shingo Kunieda	6	6
(Austria) Martin Legner	2	0
(Sweden) Stefan Olsson	2	6	6
WC	(Netherlands) Ronald Vink	6	2	3
(Netherlands) Robin Ammerlaan	7	6
(France) Nicolas Peifer	6^{2}	1
(Netherlands) Maikel Scheffers	2	6	6
2	(France) Stéphane Houdet	6	0	1

Semifinals
1	(Japan) Shingo Kunieda	6	6
(Sweden) Stefan Olsson	1	1
(Netherlands) Robin Ammerlaan	4	5
(Netherlands) Maikel Scheffers	6	7

Finals
1	(Japan) Shingo Kunieda	6	6
(Netherlands) Maikel Scheffers	0	0
