= 2009 US Open – Men's singles =

Men's singles
- 2009 US Open

Final
- Champion: (Argentina) Juan Martín del Potro
- Runner-up: (Switzerland) Roger Federer
- Score: 3–6, 7–6^{(7–5)}, 4–6, 7–6^{(7–4)}, 6–2

Details
- Draw: 128
- Seeds: 32

Events
Singles	men	women		boys	girls
Doubles	men	women	mixed	boys	girls
WC Singles	men	women	quad
WC Doubles	men	women	quad
Legends	men	women	mixed
- US Open

Juan Martín del Potro defeated five-time defending champion Roger Federer in the final, 3–6, 7–6^{(7–5)}, 4–6, 7–6^{(7–4)}, 6–2 to win the men's singles tennis title at the 2009 US Open. It was his first and only major title. Del Potro was the first Argentine to win the title since Guillermo Vilas in 1977, and remains the most recent non-European player to win a major title as of 2026. This was the first US Open final since 1999 to go to five sets.

Federer was attempting to become the first man in the Open Era to win six consecutive US Open titles, and the first since Bill Tilden in 1925. He was also vying to become the first man to win the Surface Slam (winning majors on clay, grass and hard court in the same calendar year), having won the French Open and Wimbledon. It was the only major between the 2005 Australian Open and the 2012 US Open not won by the Big Three (Novak Djokovic, Federer, and Rafael Nadal), a span of 30 events. This was the only major where the Big Three all reached the semifinals, but none of them won the championship.

This was the first major since the 2006 Australian Open not to have Federer and Nadal as the top two seeds. Andy Murray was seeded second ahead of Nadal, having become the world No. 2 shortly before the tournament. Nadal reclaimed the world No. 2 ranking after Murray lost to Marin Čilić in the fourth round.

This tournament marked the final major appearance of two-time major champion and former world No. 1 Marat Safin.

For the first time in tournament history, no Americans reached the quarterfinals.

== Seeds ==
1. (Switzerland) Roger Federer (final)
2. (United Kingdom) Andy Murray (fourth round)
3. (Spain) Rafael Nadal (semifinals)
4. (Serbia) Novak Djokovic (semifinals)
5. (United States) Andy Roddick (third round)
6. (Argentina) Juan Martín del Potro (champion)
7. (France) Jo-Wilfried Tsonga (fourth round)
8. (Russia) Nikolay Davydenko (fourth round, retired because of a hip injury)
9. (France) Gilles Simon (third round, retired because of a knee injury)
10. (Spain) Fernando Verdasco (quarterfinals)
11. (Chile) Fernando González (quarterfinals)
12. (Sweden) Robin Söderling (quarterfinals)
13. (France) Gaël Monfils (fourth round)
14. (Spain) Tommy Robredo (fourth round)
15. (Czech Republic) Radek Štěpánek (fourth round)
16. (Croatia) Marin Čilić (quarterfinals)

17. (Czech Republic) Tomáš Berdych (third round)
18. (Spain) David Ferrer (second round)
19. (Switzerland) Stan Wawrinka (first round)
20. (Germany) Tommy Haas (third round)
21. (United States) James Blake (third round)
22. (United States) Sam Querrey (third round)
23. (Germany) Philipp Kohlschreiber (third round)
24. (Spain) Juan Carlos Ferrero (fourth round)
25. (United States) Mardy Fish (withdrew because of a rib injury)
26. (France) Paul-Henri Mathieu (first round)
27. (Croatia) Ivo Karlović (first round)
28. (Romania) Victor Hănescu (first round)
29. (Russia) Igor Andreev (first round)
30. (Serbia) Viktor Troicki (second round)
31. (Australia) Lleyton Hewitt (third round)
32. (Spain) Nicolás Almagro (third round)

Click on the seed number of a player to go to their draw section.

== Draw ==
Key

- Q = Qualifier
- WC = Wild card
- LL = Lucky loser
- Alt = Alternate
- ITF = ITF entry
- PR = Protected ranking
- SR = Special ranking
- SE = Special exempt
- JE = Junior exempt
- JR = Junior Accelerator Programme entrant
- CO = College Accelerator Programme entrant
- NG = Next Gen Accelerator Program entrant
- w/o = Walkover
- r = Retired
- d = Defaulted

=== Finals ===
Quarterfinals
1	(Switzerland) Roger Federer	6	6	6^{6}	7^{8}
12	(Sweden) Robin Söderling	0	3	7^{8}	6^{6}
4	(Serbia) Novak Djokovic	7^{7}	1	7	6
10	(Spain) Fernando Verdasco	6^{2}	6	5	2
11	(Chile) Fernando González	6^{4}	6^{2}	0
3	(Spain) Rafael Nadal	7^{7}	7^{7}	6
6	(Argentina) Juan Martín del Potro	4	6	6	6
16	(Croatia) Marin Čilić	6	3	2	1

Semifinals
1	(Switzerland) Roger Federer	7^{7}	7	7
4	(Serbia) Novak Djokovic	6^{3}	5	5
3	(Spain) Rafael Nadal	2	2	2
6	(Argentina) Juan Martín del Potro	6	6	6

Final
1	(Switzerland) Roger Federer	6	6^{5}	6	6^{4}	2
6	(Argentina) Juan Martín del Potro	3	7^{7}	4	7^{7}	6

=== Top half ===
==== Section 1 ====
First round
1	(Switzerland) R Federer	6	6	7
WC	(United States) D Britton	1	3	5
Q	(Ecuador) G Lapentti	3	6	6	0	6^{9}
(Germany) S Greul	6	4	3	6	7^{11}
PR	(Argentina) JI Chela	6	6	6
(Spain) Ó Hernández	4	4	2
(Brazil) T Alves	0	3	4
31	(Australia) L Hewitt	6	6	6
21	(United States) J Blake	6	6	7
(Spain) R Ramírez Hidalgo	1	4	5
(Belgium) O Rochus	6	6	6
(Russia) I Kunitsyn	3	0	2
Q	(Canada) P Polansky	4	4	7	6	1
(Spain) G García-López	6	6	5	3	6
Q	(United States) D Young	4	6	2	3
14	(Spain) T Robredo	6	3	6	6

Second round
1	(Switzerland) R Federer	6	7	7
(Germany) S Greul	3	5	5
PR	(Argentina) JI Chela	3	3	4
31	(Australia) L Hewitt	6	6	6
21	(United States) J Blake	6	3	7^{8}	6
(Belgium) O Rochus	4	6	6^{6}	3
(Spain) G García-López	2	6	2	4
14	(Spain) T Robredo	6	4	6	6

Third round
1	(Switzerland) R Federer	4	6	7	6
31	(Australia) L Hewitt	6	3	5	4
21	(United States) J Blake	6^{2}	4	4
14	(Spain) T Robredo	7^{7}	6	6

Fourth round
1	(Switzerland) R Federer	7	6	6
14	(Spain) T Robredo	5	2	2

==== Section 2 ====
First round
12	(Sweden) R Söderling	6	3	6	6
(Spain) A Montañés	1	6	1	4
(Germany) M Zverev	6	5	6	4	0
(Spain) M Granollers	2	7	3	6	6
(United States) K Kim	6	0	6	6
(Israel) D Sela	3	6	2	2
Q	(United States) M Yani	3	5	4
22	(United States) S Querrey	6	7	6
26	(France) P-H Mathieu	6	5	0	2
(Russia) M Youzhny	2	7	6	6
(Italy) P Starace	6^{3}	6^{2}	0
Q	(Switzerland) M Chiudinelli	7^{7}	7^{7}	6
(Czech Republic) J Hernych	1	7^{7}	6	2	6
(Germany) R Schüttler	6	6^{5}	4	6	3
Q	(Germany) D Kindlmann	3	4	5
8	(Russia) N Davydenko	6	6	7

Second round
12	(Sweden) R Söderling	2
(Spain) M Granollers	0^{r}
(United States) K Kim	5	7^{8}	4	4
22	(United States) S Querrey	7	6^{6}	6	6
(Russia) M Youzhny	6	6^{4}	4	3
Q	(Switzerland) M Chiudinelli	2	7^{7}	6	6
(Czech Republic) J Hernych	4	1	2
8	(Russia) N Davydenko	6	6	6

Third round
12	(Sweden) R Söderling	6	7	6^{6}	6
22	(United States) S Querrey	2	5	7^{8}	1
Q	(Switzerland) M Chiudinelli	4	5	5
8	(Russia) N Davydenko	6	7	7

Fourth round
12	(Sweden) R Söderling	7	3	6	0
8	(Russia) N Davydenko	5	6	2	0^{r}

==== Section 3 ====
First round
4	(Serbia) N Djokovic	6	6	6
(Croatia) I Ljubičić	3	1	3
Q	(Argentina) JP Brzezicki	6^{5}	3	4
Q	(Australia) C Ball	7^{7}	6	6
(Slovakia) K Beck	6	6	1	4	3
(Argentina) M González	2	1	6	6	6
Q	(United States) J Witten	6	6	6
29	(Russia) I Andreev	4	0	2
23	(Germany) P Kohlschreiber	6	6	6
(Italy) A Seppi	0	4	4
Q	(India) S Devvarman	6	6	6
(Portugal) F Gil	3	4	3
(Kazakhstan) A Golubev	4	6	5	3
(Argentina) L Mayer	6	4	7	6
(Italy) S Bolelli	4	4	4
15	(Czech Republic) R Štěpánek	6	6	6

Second round
4	(Serbia) N Djokovic	6	6	6
Q	(Australia) C Ball	3	4	4
(Argentina) M González	7^{7}	4	5	2
Q	(United States) J Witten	6^{3}	6	7	6
23	(Germany) P Kohlschreiber	6	6	0	6
Q	(India) S Devvarman	3	4	6	2
(Argentina) L Mayer	6^{5}	3	4
15	(Czech Republic) R Štěpánek	7^{7}	6	6

Third round
4	(Serbia) N Djokovic	6^{2}	6	7^{7}	6
Q	(United States) J Witten	7^{7}	3	6^{2}	4
23	(Germany) P Kohlschreiber	6	2	3	3
15	(Czech Republic) R Štěpánek	4	6	6	6

Fourth round
4	(Serbia) N Djokovic	6	6	6
15	(Czech Republic) R Štěpánek	1	3	3

==== Section 4 ====
First round
10	(Spain) F Verdasco	7	6	7
(Germany) B Becker	5	4	5
(France) F Serra	7^{10}	7^{7}	7^{7}
(Serbia) J Tipsarević	6^{8}	6^{5}	6^{5}
(United States) R Kendrick	6	6	6
(Argentina) M Vassallo Argüello	3	2	2
Q	(Colombia) A Falla	5	6	6^{7}	2
20	(Germany) T Haas	7	4	7^{9}	6
28	(Romania) V Hănescu	1	6^{14}	6^{5}
(United States) J Isner	6	7^{16}	7^{7}
Q	(Turkey) M İlhan	3	6	3	7	7
(Belgium) C Rochus	6	3	6	5	5
(France) M Gicquel	6	5	6	6
(Russia) D Tursunov	2	7	3	3
(Germany) B Phau	1	4	2
5	(United States) A Roddick	6	6	6

Second round
10	(Spain) F Verdasco	6	6	6
(France) F Serra	3	0	3
(United States) R Kendrick	4	4	6^{3}
20	(Germany) T Haas	6	6	7^{7}
(United States) J Isner	6	6	7^{7}
Q	(Turkey) M İlhan	3	4	6^{1}
(France) M Gicquel	1	4	4
5	(United States) A Roddick	6	6	6

Third round
10	(Spain) F Verdasco	3	7	7^{10}	1	6
20	(Germany) T Haas	6	5	6^{8}	6	4
(United States) J Isner	7^{7}	6	3	5	7^{7}
5	(United States) A Roddick	6^{3}	3	6	7	6^{5}

Fourth round
10	(Spain) F Verdasco	4	6	6	6
(United States) J Isner	6	4	4	4

=== Bottom half ===
==== Section 5 ====
First round
7	(France) J-W Tsonga	6	6	6
WC	(United States) C Buchanan	0	2	1
(Finland) J Nieminen	7	7^{8}	6
(Italy) F Fognini	5	6^{6}	4
(Italy) F Cipolla	6	1	3	3
(France) J Benneteau	4	6	6	6
LL	(Australia) P Luczak	3	3	6	6	1
30	(Serbia) V Troicki	6	6	1	2	6
17	(Czech Republic) T Berdych	7	6	6
(United States) W Odesnik	5	4	4
Q	(Germany) M Berrer	3	6^{7}	6	0
Q	(Argentina) H Zeballos	6	7^{9}	3	6
Q	(France) J Ouanna	7^{7}	6	3	6
(United States) R Ram	6^{4}	4	6	3
(Chile) N Massú	3	3	3
11	(Chile) F González	6	6	6

Second round
7	(France) J-W Tsonga	7	6	6
(Finland) J Nieminen	5	3	4
(France) J Benneteau	6	3	6	6
30	(Serbia) V Troicki	1	6	1	0
17	(Czech Republic) T Berdych	6	6^{3}	7^{7}	6
Q	(Argentina) H Zeballos	3	7^{7}	6^{2}	2
Q	(France) J Ouanna	4	7^{7}	3	4
11	(Chile) F González	6	6^{5}	6	6

Third round
7	(France) J-W Tsonga	7^{7}	6	6
(France) J Benneteau	6^{4}	2	4
17	(Czech Republic) T Berdych	5	4	4
11	(Chile) F González	7	6	6

Fourth round
7	(France) J-W Tsonga	6	3	6^{3}	4
11	(Chile) F González	3	6	7^{7}	6

==== Section 6 ====
First round
13	(France) G Monfils	6	6	6
(France) J Chardy	1	4	3
(Russia) E Korolev	3	4	6	6	4
(Germany) A Beck	6	6	2	2	6
(Brazil) M Daniel	2	4	3
(Argentina) J Acasuso	6	6	6
(Spain) A Martín	5	7	3	3
18	(Spain) D Ferrer	7	5	6	6
32	(Spain) N Almagro	6	6	2	7^{10}
(Belgium) S Darcis	2	4	6	6^{8}
(United States) R Ginepri	5	6	6	6
PR	(Romania) A Pavel	7	2	4	0
WC	(France) M Llodra	3	4	4
(Germany) N Kiefer	6	6	6
(France) R Gasquet	2	2	3
3	(Spain) R Nadal	6	6	6

Second round
13	(France) G Monfils	6	7	6
(Germany) A Beck	3	5	3
(Argentina) J Acasuso	6	3	1	6	6
18	(Spain) D Ferrer	3	6	6	3	2
32	(Spain) N Almagro	6^{7}	6	6	4	6
(United States) R Ginepri	7^{9}	2	3	6	4
(Germany) N Kiefer	0	6	3	4
3	(Spain) R Nadal	6	3	6	6

Third round
13	(France) G Monfils	6	6	1
(Argentina) J Acasuso	3	4	0^{r}
32	(Spain) N Almagro	5	4	4
3	(Spain) R Nadal	7	6	6

Fourth round
13	(France) G Monfils	7^{7}	3	1	3
3	(Spain) R Nadal	6^{3}	6	6	6

==== Section 7 ====
First round
6	(Argentina) JM del Potro	6	6	6
(Argentina) J Mónaco	3	3	1
(Austria) J Melzer	1	6	6	6
(Russia) M Safin	6	4	3	4
(Uruguay) P Cuevas	6	7^{7}	6
WC	(Australia) C Guccione	4	6^{4}	0
(Austria) D Köllerer	6	6	2	6
LL	(Portugal) R Machado	2	4	6	2
24	(Spain) JC Ferrero	6	6	6
(France) F Santoro	4	3	3
(Germany) P Petzschner	7^{7}	6^{6}	6	4	6
(Ukraine) S Stakhovsky	6^{3}	7^{8}	4	6	3
Q	(Brazil) T Bellucci	6	6	6
(Chinese Taipei) Y-h Lu	4	2	3
(Spain) D Gimeno Traver	4	6^{3}	3
9	(France) G Simon	6	7^{7}	6

Second round
6	(Argentina) JM del Potro	7^{8}	6	6
(Austria) J Melzer	6^{6}	3	3
(Uruguay) P Cuevas	6	2	1	4
(Austria) D Köllerer	3	6	6	6
24	(Spain) JC Ferrero	1	3	6	6	6
(Germany) P Petzschner	6	6	4	2	4
Q	(Brazil) T Bellucci	3	2	4
9	(France) G Simon	6	6	6

Third round
6	(Argentina) JM del Potro	6	3	6	6
(Austria) D Köllerer	1	6	3	3
24	(Spain) JC Ferrero	1	6	7^{7}	1
9	(France) G Simon	6	4	6^{5}	0^{r}

Fourth round
6	(Argentina) JM del Potro	6	6	6
24	(Spain) JC Ferrero	3	3	3

==== Section 8 ====
First round
16	(Croatia) M Čilić	7^{7}	6	7^{7}
WC	(United States) R Sweeting	6^{2}	4	6^{4}
(Russia) T Gabashvili	5	1	2
WC	(United States) J Levine	7	6	6
(Uzbekistan) D Istomin	6	6	7^{7}
WC	(United States) B Evans	4	4	6^{3}
(Ecuador) N Lapentti	4	3	7^{8}	7^{7}	6
19	(Switzerland) S Wawrinka	6	6	6^{6}	6^{4}	3
27	(Croatia) I Karlović	4	6^{8}	6^{5}
(Spain) I Navarro	6	7^{10}	7^{7}
(Spain) F López	6	6^{6}	3	5
WC	(United States) T Dent	4	7^{8}	6	7
(Chile) P Capdeville	6	6	7^{7}
(Romania) V Crivoi	3	0	6^{2}
(Latvia) E Gulbis	5	3	5
2	(United Kingdom) A Murray	7	6	7

Second round
16	(Croatia) M Čilić	4	2	6	6	6
WC	(United States) J Levine	6	6	0	3	0
(Uzbekistan) D Istomin	2	6	4	7	7^{7}
(Ecuador) N Lapentti	6	4	6	5	6^{4}
(Spain) I Navarro	4	7	7^{7}	5	6^{9}
WC	(United States) T Dent	6	5	6^{1}	7	7^{11}
(Chile) P Capdeville	2	6	0	2
2	(United Kingdom) A Murray	6	3	6	6

Third round
16	(Croatia) M Čilić	6	6	6
(Uzbekistan) D Istomin	1	4	3
WC	(United States) T Dent	3	2	2
2	(United Kingdom) A Murray	6	6	6

Fourth round
16	(Croatia) M Čilić	7	6	6
2	(United Kingdom) A Murray	5	2	2

Preceded by 2009 Wimbledon Championships – Men's singles	Grand Slam men's singles	Succeeded by 2010 Australian Open – Men's singles
