= Tobias Blomgren =

Swedish tennis player (born 1992)

- Full name: Tobias Blomgren
- Country (sports): Sweden
- Residence: Sweden
- Born: 9 July 1992 (age 33) Sweden
- Plays: Left-handed
- Prize money: $13,805

Singles
- Career record: 0–0 (at ATP Tour level, Grand Slam level, and in Davis Cup)
- Career titles: 0; 0 Challenger, 0 Futures
- Highest ranking: No. 763 (2 April 2012)

Doubles
- Career record: 0–1 (at ATP Tour level, Grand Slam level, and in Davis Cup)
- Career titles: 0; 0 Challenger, 1 Futures
- Highest ranking: No. 876 (10 November 2014)
- Last updated on: 22 November 2021.

Tobias Blomgren (born 9 July 1992) is a Swedish tennis player.

Blomgren has a career-high ATP singles ranking of World No. 763, achieved on 2 April 2012. He also has a career-high ATP doubles ranking of World No. 876, achieved on 10 November 2014. He has a reached 2 singles finals on the ITF Futures tour, finishing runner-up on both occasions. Additionally, he has reached 4 doubles finals also at the ITF Futures level with a record of 1 win and 3 losses. He won his first and only professional-level title in September 2013 at the Turkey F34 Futures tournament where partnering Dekel Bar of Israel, they defeated Marcus Daniell and Richard Gabb in a third set tie-breaker 2–6, 6–4, [10–8].

Blomgren made his ATP Tour debut at the 2010 Swedish Open held in Båstad. Alongside compatriot Christian Lindell, the pair received a wild card entry into the main doubles draw where they proceeded to lose in the first round to Polish duo Mateusz Kowalczyk and Tomasz Bednarek in 3 sets 6–3, 2–6, [7–10].

== ATP Challenger and ITF Futures finals ==
=== Singles: 2 (0–2) ===
Legend ATP Challenger (0–0) ITF Futures (0–2)	Finals by surface Hard (0–2) Clay (0–0) Grass (0–0) Carpet (0–0)

Result	W–L	Date	Tournament	Tier	Surface	Opponent	Score
Loss	0–1	Mar 2012	Israel F4, Herzlia	Futures	Hard	(France) Axel Michon	3–6, 3–6
Loss	0–2	Sep 2013	Sweden F4, Gothenburg	Futures	Hard	(Germany) Tim Nekic	6–2, 4–6, 4–6

=== Doubles: 4 (1–3) ===
Legend ATP Challenger (0–0) ITF Futures (1–3)	Finals by surface Hard (1–3) Clay (0–0) Grass (0–0) Carpet (0–0)

Result	W–L	Date	Tournament	Tier	Surface	Partner	Opponents	Score
Loss	0–1	Sep 2010	Sweden F2, Falun	Futures	Hard	(Finland) Micke Kontinen	(Sweden) Markus Eriksson (Sweden) Carl Bergman	6–3, 3–6, [4–10]
Loss	0–2	Sep 2011	Sweden F5, Danderyd	Futures	Hard	(Sweden) Jesper Brunstrom	(United Kingdom) Lewis Burton (United Kingdom) George Morgan	3–6, 2–6
Win	1–2	Sep 2013	Turkey F34, Antalya	Futures	Hard	(Israel) Dekel Bar	(New Zealand) Marcus Daniell (United Kingdom) Richard Gabb	2–6, 6–4, [10–8]
Loss	1–3	Sep 2014	Sweden F4, Danderyd	Futures	Hard	(Sweden) Jacob Adaktusson	(India) N. Sriram Balaji (Sweden) Patrik Rosenholm	4–6, 4–6
