= 2009 US Open – Wheelchair quad doubles =

Wheelchair quad doubles
- 2009 US Open

Final
- Champion: (United States) Nicholas Taylor (United States) David Wagner
- Runner-up: (Sweden) Johan Andersson (United Kingdom) Peter Norfolk
- Score: 6–1, 6–7(5), 6–3

Events
Singles	men	women		boys	girls
Doubles	men	women	mixed	boys	girls
WC Singles	men	women	quad
WC Doubles	men	women	quad
Legends	men	women	mixed
← 2007 ·	US Open	· 2010 →

Defending champions Nicholas Taylor and David Wagner defeated Johan Andersson and Peter Norfolk in the final, 6–1, 6–7^{(5–7)}, 6–3 to win the quad doubles wheelchair tennis title at the 2009 US Open.

The event was not held in 2008 due to a schedule conflict with the 2008 Summer Paralympics, an issue that would continue to affect US Open wheelchair tennis until 2021.

== Main draw ==
=== Key ===
- Q = Qualifier
- WC = Wild card
- LL = Lucky loser
- Alt = Alternate
- SE = Special exempt
- PR = Protected ranking
- ITF = ITF entry
- JE = Junior exempt
- w/o = Walkover
- r = Retired
- d = Defaulted
- SR = Special ranking

=== Finals ===
Finals
(United States) Nicholas Taylor (United States) David Wagner	6	6^{5}	6
(Sweden) Johan Andersson (United Kingdom) Peter Norfolk	1	7	3
