= 2009 US Open – Men's doubles =

Men's doubles
- 2009 US Open

Final
- Champion: (Czech Republic) Lukáš Dlouhý (India) Leander Paes
- Runner-up: (India) Mahesh Bhupathi (The Bahamas) Mark Knowles
- Score: 3–6, 6–3, 6–2

Details
- Draw: 64
- Seeds: 16

Events
Singles	men	women		boys	girls
Doubles	men	women	mixed	boys	girls
WC Singles	men	women	quad
WC Doubles	men	women	quad
Legends	men	women	mixed
← 2008 ·	US Open	· 2010 →

Bob Bryan and Mike Bryan were the defending champions, but lost in the semifinals against Lukáš Dlouhý and Leander Paes.

Lukáš Dlouhý and Leander Paes won in the final 3–6, 6–3, 6–2 against Mahesh Bhupathi and Mark Knowles.

== Seeds ==
1. (United States) Bob Bryan / (United States) Mike Bryan (semifinals)
2. (Canada) Daniel Nestor / (Serbia) Nenad Zimonjić (quarterfinals)
3. (India) Mahesh Bhupathi / (The Bahamas) Mark Knowles (final)
4. (Czech Republic) Lukáš Dlouhý / (India) Leander Paes (champions)
5. (Belarus) Max Mirnyi / (Israel) Andy Ram (semifinals)
6. (Poland) Mariusz Fyrstenberg / (Poland) Marcin Matkowski (first round)
7. (South Africa) Wesley Moodie / (Belgium) Dick Norman (quarterfinals)
8. (Brazil) Bruno Soares / (Zimbabwe) Kevin Ullyett (second round)
9. (Poland) Łukasz Kubot / (Austria) Oliver Marach (first round)
10. (Czech Republic) František Čermák / (Slovakia) Michal Mertiňák (second round)
11. (Czech Republic) Martin Damm / (Sweden) Robert Lindstedt (third round)
12. (Sweden) Simon Aspelin / (Australia) Paul Hanley (first round)
13. (United States) Travis Parrott / (Slovakia) Filip Polášek (first round)
14. (Australia) Ashley Fisher / (Australia) Jordan Kerr (first round)
15. (Australia) Stephen Huss / (United Kingdom) Ross Hutchins (first round)
16. (Brazil) Marcelo Melo / (Brazil) André Sá (second round)

== Draw ==
=== Key ===
- Q = Qualifier
- WC = Wild card
- LL = Lucky loser
- Alt = Alternate
- ITF = ITF entry
- PR = Protected ranking
- SR = Special ranking
- SE = Special exempt
- JE = Junior exempt
- JR = Junior Accelerator Programme entrant
- CO = College Accelerator Programme entrant
- NG = Next Gen Accelerator Program entrant
- w/o = Walkover
- r = Retired
- d = Defaulted

=== Finals ===
Quarterfinals
1	(United States) Bob Bryan (United States) Mike Bryan	6	7^{7}
Alt	(Australia) Carsten Ball (Australia) Chris Guccione	4	6^{2}
4	(Czech Republic) Lukáš Dlouhý (India) Leander Paes	6	5	6
7	(South Africa) Wesley Moodie (Belgium) Dick Norman	3	7	4
(Croatia) Ivan Ljubičić (France) Michaël Llodra	4	6	6^{4}
3	(India) Mahesh Bhupathi (The Bahamas) Mark Knowles	6	4	7^{7}
5	(Belarus) Max Mirnyi (Israel) Andy Ram	6^{4}	6	6
2	(Canada) Daniel Nestor (Serbia) Nenad Zimonjić	7^{7}	4	0

Semifinals
1	(United States) Bob Bryan (United States) Mike Bryan	4	6	6^{6}
4	(Czech Republic) Lukáš Dlouhý (India) Leander Paes	6	3	7^{8}
3	(India) Mahesh Bhupathi (The Bahamas) Mark Knowles	6	6
5	(Belarus) Max Mirnyi (Israel) Andy Ram	4	2

Final
4	(Czech Republic) Lukáš Dlouhý (India) Leander Paes	3	6	6
3	(India) Mahesh Bhupathi (The Bahamas) Mark Knowles	6	3	2

=== Top half ===
==== Section 1 ====
First round
1	(United States) B Bryan (United States) M Bryan	6	6
(Argentina) J Acasuso (Argentina) M Vassallo Argüello	3	4
(Romania) A Pavel (Romania) H Tecău	6	6
(France) N Mahut (France) P-H Mathieu	3	4
(Spain) Ó Hernández (Spain) A Montañés	6	1	6
WC	(United States) R Ginepri (United States) S Jenkins	4	6	1
(Spain) G García-López (Belgium) O Rochus	2	6	6
15	(Australia) S Huss (United Kingdom) R Hutchins	6	4	4
9	(Poland) Ł Kubot (Austria) O Marach	6	4	3
(Czech Republic) L Friedl (Czech Republic) J Levinský	3	6	6
WC	(United States) D Martin (United States) D Young	6^{3}	6	4
(Germany) M Kohlmann (Netherlands) R Wassen	7^{7}	4	6
(Brazil) T Bellucci (Brazil) M Daniel	3	4
Alt	(Australia) C Ball (Australia) C Guccione	6	6
WC	(United States) R Harrison (United States) K Van't Hof	6	6^{10}	7
6	(Poland) M Fyrstenberg (Poland) M Matkowski	3	7^{12}	5

Second round
1	(United States) B Bryan (United States) M Bryan	7^{7}	6
(Romania) A Pavel (Romania) H Tecău	6^{2}	3
(Spain) Ó Hernández (Spain) A Montañés	3	3
(Spain) G García-López (Belgium) O Rochus	6	6
(Czech Republic) L Friedl (Czech Republic) J Levinský	7^{7}	4	6
(Germany) M Kohlmann (Netherlands) R Wassen	6^{4}	6	1
Alt	(Australia) C Ball (Australia) C Guccione	6^{5}	7	6
WC	(United States) R Harrison (United States) K Van't Hof	7^{7}	5	2

Third round
1	(United States) B Bryan (United States) M Bryan	7	6
(Spain) G García-López (Belgium) O Rochus	5	3
(Czech Republic) L Friedl (Czech Republic) J Levinský	2	1
Alt	(Australia) C Ball (Australia) C Guccione	6	6

Quarterfinals
1	(United States) B Bryan (United States) M Bryan	6	7^{7}
Alt	(Australia) C Ball (Australia) C Guccione	4	6^{2}

==== Section 2 ====
First round
4	(Czech Republic) L Dlouhý (India) L Paes	7^{13}	7^{7}
PR	(Romania) V Hănescu (Romania) G Trifu	6^{11}	6^{4}
(Spain) N Almagro (Spain) R Ramírez Hidalgo	6	7^{9}
(Russia) T Gabashvili (Russia) D Tursunov	1	6^{7}
(Italy) F Fognini (Italy) P Starace	3	4
(Austria) J Knowle (Austria) J Melzer	6	6
(Austria) D Köllerer (Belgium) C Rochus	6	3	3
16	(Brazil) M Melo (Brazil) A Sá	2	6	6
11	(Czech Republic) M Damm (Sweden) R Lindstedt	7	6
(Argentina) S Prieto (Argentina) S Roitman	5	2
WC	(United States) D Nguyen (United States) JT Sundling	6	2	1
(Argentina) M González (Argentina) J Mónaco	3	6	6
(France) M Gicquel (France) F Santoro	6	7
(Czech Republic) D Škoch (Slovakia) I Zelenay	4	5
(France) J Benneteau (France) J Chardy	4	7^{7}	4
7	(South Africa) W Moodie (Belgium) D Norman	6	6^{4}	6

Second round
4	(Czech Republic) L Dlouhý (India) L Paes	6	6
(Spain) N Almagro (Spain) R Ramírez Hidalgo	2	3
(Austria) J Knowle (Austria) J Melzer	5	6	6
16	(Brazil) M Melo (Brazil) A Sá	7	4	4
11	(Czech Republic) M Damm (Sweden) R Lindstedt	6	6
(Argentina) M González (Argentina) J Mónaco	2	4
(France) M Gicquel (France) F Santoro	6^{5}	6^{4}
7	(South Africa) W Moodie (Belgium) D Norman	7^{7}	7^{7}

Third round
4	(Czech Republic) L Dlouhý (India) L Paes	7	6
(Austria) J Knowle (Austria) J Melzer	5	4
11	(Czech Republic) M Damm (Sweden) R Lindstedt	7^{7}	6^{2}	6^{5}
7	(South Africa) W Moodie (Belgium) D Norman	6^{4}	7^{7}	7^{7}

Quarterfinals
4	(Czech Republic) L Dlouhý (India) L Paes	6	5	6
7	(South Africa) W Moodie (Belgium) D Norman	3	7	4

=== Bottom half ===
==== Section 3 ====
First round
8	(Brazil) B Soares (Zimbabwe) K Ullyett	3	6	6
(South Africa) J Coetzee (Israel) J Erlich	6	3	4
(Argentina) L Arnold Ker (Argentina) L Mayer	6	4	2
PR	(Argentina) JI Chela (Uruguay) P Cuevas	4	6	6
WC	(United States) W Odesnik (United States) M Shabaz	3	4
(United States) J Isner (United States) S Querrey	6	6
(Croatia) I Ljubičić (France) M Llodra	4	6	6
12	(Sweden) S Aspelin (Australia) P Hanley	6	3	4
13	(United States) T Parrott (Slovakia) F Polášek	6	6^{2}	2
(Chinese Taipei) Y-h Lu (Israel) D Sela	3	7^{7}	6
(Germany) C Kas (Germany) P Petzschner	6^{2}	3
(Spain) M Granollers (Spain) T Robredo	7^{7}	6
WC	(United States) J Levine (United States) R Sweeting	6	7
(Sweden) J Brunström (Netherlands Antilles) J-J Rojer	4	5
(United States) J Cerretani (Croatia) L Zovko	3	4
3	(India) M Bhupathi (The Bahamas) M Knowles	6	6

Second round
8	(Brazil) B Soares (Zimbabwe) K Ullyett	6	3	3
PR	(Argentina) JI Chela (Uruguay) P Cuevas	1	6	6
(United States) J Isner (United States) S Querrey	6	6^{12}	2
(Croatia) I Ljubičić (France) M Llodra	3	7^{14}	6
(Chinese Taipei) Y-h Lu (Israel) D Sela	w/o
(Spain) M Granollers (Spain) T Robredo
WC	(United States) J Levine (United States) R Sweeting	5	2
3	(India) M Bhupathi (The Bahamas) M Knowles	7	6

Third round
PR	(Argentina) JI Chela (Uruguay) P Cuevas	5	6	3
(Croatia) I Ljubičić (France) M Llodra	7	2	6
(Chinese Taipei) Y-h Lu (Israel) D Sela	4	4
3	(India) M Bhupathi (The Bahamas) M Knowles	6	6

Quarterfinals
(Croatia) I Ljubičić (France) M Llodra	4	6	6^{4}
3	(India) M Bhupathi (The Bahamas) M Knowles	6	4	7^{7}

==== Section 4 ====
First round
5	(Belarus) M Mirnyi (Israel) A Ram	6	6
(United States) E Butorac (United States) S Lipsky	3	1
WC	(United States) B Evans (United States) A Kuznetsov	6^{6}	5
(Serbia) D Vemić (Germany) M Zverev	7^{8}	7
(Italy) S Bolelli (Italy) A Seppi	6	3	6
(Austria) A Peya (Ukraine) S Stakhovsky	3	6	3
(Germany) F Moser (France) F Serra	4	1
10	(Czech Republic) F Čermák (Slovakia) M Mertiňák	6	6
14	(Australia) A Fisher (Australia) J Kerr	6^{4}	4
(South Africa) R de Voest (United States) R Ram	7^{7}	6
(Germany) B Becker (Russia) I Kunitsyn	3	4
(United States) R Kendrick (Serbia) J Tipsarević	6	6
(Kazakhstan) A Golubev (Uzbekistan) D Istomin	6	6^{11}	4
Alt	(Finland) J Nieminen (Pakistan) A-u-H Qureshi	4	7^{13}	6
(Germany) A Beck (Germany) S Greul	3	5
2	(Canada) D Nestor (Serbia) N Zimonjić	6	7

Second round
5	(Belarus) M Mirnyi (Israel) A Ram	7	3	6
(Serbia) D Vemić (Germany) M Zverev	5	6	1
(Italy) S Bolelli (Italy) A Seppi	7^{7}	6^{5}	6
10	(Czech Republic) F Čermák (Slovakia) M Mertiňák	6^{3}	7^{7}	2
(South Africa) R de Voest (United States) R Ram	2	6	5
(United States) R Kendrick (Serbia) J Tipsarević	6	4	7
Alt	(Finland) J Nieminen (Pakistan) A-u-H Qureshi	6^{5}	3
2	(Canada) D Nestor (Serbia) N Zimonjić	7^{7}	6

Third round
5	(Belarus) M Mirnyi (Israel) A Ram	7^{7}	6^{8}	6
(Italy) S Bolelli (Italy) A Seppi	6^{5}	7^{10}	2
(United States) R Kendrick (Serbia) J Tipsarević	2	7	4
2	(Canada) D Nestor (Serbia) N Zimonjić	6	5	6

Quarterfinals
5	(Belarus) M Mirnyi (Israel) A Ram	6^{4}	6	6
2	(Canada) D Nestor (Serbia) N Zimonjić	7^{7}	4	0
