= 2009 US Open – Wheelchair women's singles =

Wheelchair women's singles
- 2009 US Open

Final
- Champion: (Netherlands) Esther Vergeer
- Runner-up: (Netherlands) Korie Homan
- Score: 6–0, 6–0

Events
Singles	men	women		boys	girls
Doubles	men	women	mixed	boys	girls
WC Singles	men	women	quad
WC Doubles	men	women	quad
Legends	men	women	mixed
- US Open

Three-time defending champion Esther Vergeer defeated Korie Homan in the final, 6–0, 6–0 to win the women's singles wheelchair tennis title at the 2009 US Open. This was her 14th Grand Slam win.

The event was not held in 2008 due to a schedule conflict with the 2008 Summer Paralympics, an issue that would continue to affect US Open wheelchair tennis until 2021.

== Seeds ==
1. (Netherlands) Esther Vergeer (champion)
2. (Netherlands) Korie Homan (final)

== Draw ==
Key

- Q = Qualifier
- WC = Wild card
- LL = Lucky loser
- Alt = Alternate
- ITF = ITF entry
- PR = Protected ranking
- SR = Special ranking
- SE = Special exempt
- JE = Junior exempt
- JR = Junior Accelerator Programme entrant
- CO = College Accelerator Programme entrant
- NG = Next Gen Accelerator Program entrant
- w/o = Walkover
- r = Retired
- d = Defaulted

=== Finals ===
Quarterfinals
1	(Netherlands) Esther Vergeer	6	7
(France) Florence Gravellier	2	5
(Netherlands) Jiske Griffioen	4	3
(Netherlands) Aniek van Koot	6	6
WC	(United States) Emmy Kaiser	4	3
(Netherlands) Sharon Walraven	6	6
(Australia) Daniela Di Toro	2	6^{2}
2	(Netherlands) Korie Homan	6	7

Semifinals
1	(Netherlands) Esther Vergeer	6	6
(Netherlands) Aniek van Koot	0	1
(Netherlands) Sharon Walraven	4	0^{r}
2	(Netherlands) Korie Homan	6	0

Finals
1	(Netherlands) Esther Vergeer	6	6
2	(Netherlands) Korie Homan	0	0
