= 2009 US Open – Women's doubles =

Women's doubles
- 2009 US Open

Final
- Champion: (United States) Serena Williams (United States) Venus Williams
- Runner-up: (Zimbabwe) Cara Black (United States) Liezel Huber
- Score: 6–2, 6–2

Details
- Draw: 64 (7 WC )
- Seeds: 16

Events
Singles	men	women		boys	girls
Doubles	men	women	mixed	boys	girls
WC Singles	men	women	quad
WC Doubles	men	women	quad
Legends	men	women	mixed
← 2008 ·	US Open	· 2010 →

Serena and Venus Williams defeated the defending champions Cara Black and Liezel Huber in the final, 6–2, 6–2 to win the women's doubles tennis title at the 2009 US Open. It was their second US Open title together and tenth major title together overall. It was the second component in an eventual non-calendar-year Grand Slam for the sisters.

== Seeds ==
1. (Zimbabwe) Cara Black / (United States) Liezel Huber (final)
2. (Spain) Anabel Medina Garrigues / (Spain) Virginia Ruano Pascual (third round)
3. (Australia) Samantha Stosur / (Australia) Rennae Stubbs (semifinals)
4. (United States) Serena Williams / (United States) Venus Williams (champions)
5. (Slovakia) Daniela Hantuchová / (Japan) Ai Sugiyama (third round)
6. (Spain) Nuria Llagostera Vives / (Spain) María José Martínez Sánchez (quarterfinals)
7. (Chinese Taipei) Hsieh Su-wei / (China) Peng Shuai (second round)
8. (United States) Bethanie Mattek-Sands / (Russia) Nadia Petrova (quarterfinals)
9. (Germany) Anna-Lena Grönefeld / (Switzerland) Patty Schnyder (third round)
10. (Russia) Maria Kirilenko / (Russia) Elena Vesnina (quarterfinals)
11. (China) Yan Zi / (China) Zheng Jie (quarterfinals)
12. (United States) Vania King / (Romania) Monica Niculescu (third round)
13. (Russia) Alisa Kleybanova / (Russia) Ekaterina Makarova (semifinals)
14. (India) Sania Mirza / (Italy) Francesca Schiavone (second round)
15. (United States) Raquel Kops-Jones / (United States) Abigail Spears (first round)
16. (Belarus) Victoria Azarenka / (Russia) Vera Zvonareva (second round)

== Draw ==
=== Key ===
- Q = Qualifier
- WC = Wild card
- LL = Lucky loser
- Alt = Alternate
- ITF = ITF entry
- PR = Protected ranking
- SR = Special ranking
- SE = Special exempt
- JE = Junior exempt
- JR = Junior Accelerator Programme entrant
- CO = College Accelerator Programme entrant
- NG = Next Gen Accelerator Program entrant
- w/o = Walkover
- r = Retired
- d = Defaulted

=== Finals ===
Quarterfinals
1	(Zimbabwe) Cara Black (United States) Liezel Huber	6	2	7
6	(Spain) Nuria Llagostera Vives (Spain) María José Martínez Sánchez	3	6	5
3	(Australia) Samantha Stosur (Australia) Rennae Stubbs	6	6
8	(United States) Bethanie Mattek-Sands (Russia) Nadia Petrova	2	3
11	(China) Yan Zi (China) Zheng Jie	5	4
4	(United States) Serena Williams (United States) Venus Williams	7	6
10	(Russia) Maria Kirilenko (Russia) Elena Vesnina	3	6	4
13	(Russia) Alisa Kleybanova (Russia) Ekaterina Makarova	6	2	6

Semifinals
1	(Zimbabwe) Cara Black (United States) Liezel Huber	5	6	6
3	(Australia) Samantha Stosur (Australia) Rennae Stubbs	7	3	1
4	(United States) Serena Williams (United States) Venus Williams	7	3	6
13	(Russia) Alisa Kleybanova (Russia) Ekaterina Makarova	6^{4}	6	2

Final
1	(Zimbabwe) Cara Black (United States) Liezel Huber	2	2
4	(United States) Serena Williams (United States) Venus Williams	6	6

=== Top half ===
==== Section 1 ====
First round
1	(Zimbabwe) C Black (United States) L Huber	6	6
WC	(United States) C McHale (United States) A Muhammad	2	1
(Czech Republic) I Benešová (Czech Republic) B Záhlavová-Strýcová	6	6
(Switzerland) T Bacsinszky (France) A Cornet	1	2
(Belarus) O Govortsova (Russia) A Kudryavtseva	6	4	6
(Hungary) M Czink (South Africa) N Grandin	2	6	2
(Russia) V Dushevina (Australia) A Rodionova	6	6
15	(United States) R Kops-Jones (United States) A Spears	4	1
12	(United States) V King (Romania) M Niculescu	5	7	6
(Czech Republic) L Šafářová (Kazakhstan) G Voskoboeva	7	6^{4}	4
(Latvia) L Dekmeijere (United States) J Ditty	7	6
WC	(Australia) A Molik (United States) M Shaughnessy	6^{4}	1
(United Kingdom) S Borwell (United States) J Craybas	4	6	6^{4}
(France) C Pin (Spain) C Suárez Navarro	6	2	7
(Russia) A Pavlyuchenkova (Belgium) Y Wickmayer	2	5
6	(Spain) N Llagostera Vives (Spain) MJ Martínez Sánchez	6	7

Second round
1	(Zimbabwe) C Black (United States) L Huber	6	6
(Czech Republic) I Benešová (Czech Republic) B Záhlavová-Strýcová	1	4
(Belarus) O Govortsova (Russia) A Kudryavtseva	6	4	6
(Russia) V Dushevina (Australia) A Rodionova	1	6	4
12	(United States) V King (Romania) M Niculescu	6	6
(Latvia) L Dekmeijere (United States) J Ditty	2	2
(France) C Pin (Spain) C Suárez Navarro	4	1
6	(Spain) N Llagostera Vives (Spain) MJ Martínez Sánchez	6	6

Third round
1	(Zimbabwe) C Black (United States) L Huber	6	5	6
(Belarus) O Govortsova (Russia) A Kudryavtseva	4	7	1
12	(United States) V King (Romania) M Niculescu	3	6	2
6	(Spain) N Llagostera Vives (Spain) MJ Martínez Sánchez	6	4	6

Quarterfinals
1	(Zimbabwe) C Black (United States) L Huber	6	2	7
6	(Spain) N Llagostera Vives (Spain) MJ Martínez Sánchez	3	6	5

==== Section 2 ====
First round
3	(Australia) S Stosur (Australia) R Stubbs	6	6
WC	(United States) L Albanese (United States) A Haynes	3	1
(Italy) ME Camerin (Russia) A Chakvetadze	5	5
(Czech Republic) A Hlaváčková (Czech Republic) L Hradecká	7	7
(Czech Republic) P Kvitová (Ukraine) O Savchuk	4	4
(Argentina) G Dulko (Israel) S Pe'er	6	6
(Belarus) E Dzehalevich (Czech Republic) R Voráčová	7	5	1
14	(India) S Mirza (Italy) F Schiavone	5	7	6
9	(Germany) A-L Grönefeld (Switzerland) P Schnyder	6	6
(Estonia) M Ani (Estonia) K Kanepi	1	3
(Poland) K Jans (Poland) A Rosolska	7	6
(Uzbekistan) A Amanmuradova (Belarus) D Kustova	6^{6}	0
(United States) S Perry (United States) L Raymond	7	4	3
(France) V Razzano (Hungary) Á Szávay	5	6	6
WC	(United States) K Ahn (United States) C Dolehide	3	2
8	(United States) B Mattek-Sands (Russia) N Petrova	6	6

Second round
3	(Australia) S Stosur (Australia) R Stubbs	6	7
(Czech Republic) A Hlaváčková (Czech Republic) L Hradecká	3	5
(Argentina) G Dulko (Israel) S Pe'er	6	1	7
14	(India) S Mirza (Italy) F Schiavone	2	6	5
9	(Germany) A-L Grönefeld (Switzerland) P Schnyder	6	6
(Poland) K Jans (Poland) A Rosolska	2	2
(France) V Razzano (Hungary) Á Szávay	1	4
8	(United States) B Mattek-Sands (Russia) N Petrova	6	6

Third round
3	(Australia) S Stosur (Australia) R Stubbs	7	6
(Argentina) G Dulko (Israel) S Pe'er	5	3
9	(Germany) A-L Grönefeld (Switzerland) P Schnyder	6^{6}	6	3
8	(United States) B Mattek-Sands (Russia) N Petrova	7	3	6

Quarterfinals
3	(Australia) S Stosur (Australia) R Stubbs	6	6
8	(United States) B Mattek-Sands (Russia) N Petrova	2	3

=== Bottom half ===
==== Section 3 ====
First round
5	(Slovakia) D Hantuchová (Japan) A Sugiyama	6	6
(Austria) S Klemenschits (France) A Rezaï	1	2
(Poland) A Radwańska (Poland) U Radwańska	6	6^{3}	1
(Turkey) İ Şenoğlu (Kazakhstan) Y Shvedova	3	7	6
PR	(Australia) J Groth (Slovakia) J Husárová	6^{7}	4^{r}
(Romania) E Gallovits (Slovakia) M Rybáriková	7	3
(Italy) S Errani (Italy) F Pennetta	4	3
11	(China) Z Yan (China) J Zheng	6	6
16	(Belarus) V Azarenka (Russia) V Zvonareva	6	4	6
(Ukraine) A Bondarenko (Ukraine) K Bondarenko	1	6	4
(Romania) S Cîrstea (Denmark) C Wozniacki	6	6
(Austria) S Bammer (Germany) J Schruff	4	2
(Chinese Taipei) Y-j Chan (Slovenia) K Srebotnik	6	7
(Germany) K Barrois (Italy) T Garbin	0	5
(Germany) J Görges (Spain) A Parra Santonja	2	2
4	(United States) S Williams (United States) V Williams	6	6

Second round
5	(Slovakia) D Hantuchová (Japan) A Sugiyama	4	6	6
(Turkey) İ Şenoğlu (Kazakhstan) Y Shvedova	6	1	2
(Romania) E Gallovits (Slovakia) M Rybáriková	4	4
11	(China) Z Yan (China) J Zheng	6	6
16	(Belarus) V Azarenka (Russia) V Zvonareva	7	4	2
(Romania) S Cîrstea (Denmark) C Wozniacki	5	6	6
(Chinese Taipei) Y-j Chan (Slovenia) K Srebotnik	5	1
4	(United States) S Williams (United States) V Williams	7	6

Third round
5	(Slovakia) D Hantuchová (Japan) A Sugiyama	6	4	4
11	(China) Z Yan (China) J Zheng	4	6	6
(Romania) S Cîrstea (Denmark) C Wozniacki	4	2
4	(United States) S Williams (United States) V Williams	6	6

Quarterfinals
11	(China) Z Yan (China) J Zheng	5	4
4	(United States) S Williams (United States) V Williams	7	6

==== Section 4 ====
First round
7	(Chinese Taipei) S-w Hsieh (China) S Peng	4	6	6
(Chinese Taipei) C-j Chuang (Canada) A Wozniak	6	3	2
WC	(United States) A Glatch (United States) C Gullickson	4	6	7
(Slovenia) P Hercog (Italy) R Vinci	6	2	6^{7}
(Germany) T Malek (Germany) A Petkovic	7	6
(Ukraine) M Koryttseva (Belarus) T Poutchek	5	1
WC	(United States) A Rolle (United States) R Zalameda	6	4	5
10	(Russia) M Kirilenko (Russia) E Vesnina	2	6	7
13	(Russia) A Kleybanova (Russia) E Makarova	6	4	6
(Romania) A Dulgheru (Romania) R Olaru	2	6	3
(France) J Coin (Canada) M-È Pelletier	6	6
PR	(United States) L Granville (Czech Republic) V Uhlířová	2	4
(Austria) P Mayr (Switzerland) S Vögele	4	6	6
WC	(United States) S Stephens (United States) M Washington	6	2	1
(Japan) A Morita (United States) M Oudin	2	1
2	(Spain) A Medina Garrigues (Spain) V Ruano Pascual	6	6

Second round
7	(Chinese Taipei) S-w Hsieh (China) S Peng	5	3
WC	(United States) A Glatch (United States) C Gullickson	7	6
(Germany) T Malek (Germany) A Petkovic	4	3
10	(Russia) M Kirilenko (Russia) E Vesnina	6	6
13	(Russia) A Kleybanova (Russia) E Makarova	6	6
(France) J Coin (Canada) M-È Pelletier	3	4
(Austria) P Mayr (Switzerland) S Vögele	2	3
2	(Spain) A Medina Garrigues (Spain) V Ruano Pascual	6	6

Third round
WC	(United States) A Glatch (United States) C Gullickson	6^{3}	2
10	(Russia) M Kirilenko (Russia) E Vesnina	7	6
13	(Russia) A Kleybanova (Russia) E Makarova	7	6
2	(Spain) A Medina Garrigues (Spain) V Ruano Pascual	6^{3}	3

Quarterfinals
10	(Russia) M Kirilenko (Russia) E Vesnina	3	6	4
13	(Russia) A Kleybanova (Russia) E Makarova	6	2	6
