= 2009 US Open – Wheelchair women's doubles =

Wheelchair women's doubles
- 2009 US Open

Final
- Champions: (Netherlands) Korie Homan (Netherlands) Esther Vergeer
- Runners-up: (Australia) Daniela DiToro (France) Florence Gravellier
- Score: 6–2, 6–2

Events
| Singles | men | women | | boys | girls |
| Doubles | men | women | mixed | boys | girls |
| WC Singles | men | women | quad |
| WC Doubles | men | women | quad |
| Legends | men | women | mixed |
| ← 2007 · | US Open | · 2010 → |

Three-time defending champion Esther Vergeer and her partner Korie Homan defeated Daniela DiToro and Florence Gravellier in the final, 6–2, 6–2 to win the women's doubles wheelchair tennis title at the 2009 US Open. With the win, they completed the Grand Slam.

Jiske Griffioen and Vergeer were the defending champions, but did not participate together. Griffioen partnered Aniek van Koot, but was defeated in the semifinals by DiToro and Gravellier.

The event was not held in 2008 due to a schedule conflict with the 2008 Summer Paralympics, an issue that would continue to affect US Open wheelchair tennis until 2021.

== Seeds ==
1. (Netherlands) Korie Homan / (Netherlands) Esther Vergeer (champions)
2. (Australia) Daniela DiToro / (France) Florence Gravellier (final)

== Doubles ==
=== Key ===
- Q = Qualifier
- WC = Wild card
- LL = Lucky loser
- Alt = Alternate
- ITF = ITF entry
- PR = Protected ranking
- SR = Special ranking
- SE = Special exempt
- JE = Junior exempt
- JR = Junior Accelerator Programme entrant
- CO = College Accelerator Programme entrant
- NG = Next Gen Accelerator Program entrant
- w/o = Walkover
- r = Retired
- d = Defaulted

=== Finals ===
Semifinals
1 | (Netherlands) Korie Homan (Netherlands) Esther Vergeer | w/o
(United States) Emmy Kaiser (Netherlands) Sharon Walraven
(Netherlands) Jiske Griffioen (Netherlands) Aniek van Koot
2 | (Australia) Daniela DiToro (France) Florence Gravellier

Finals
1 | (Netherlands) Korie Homan (Netherlands) Esther Vergeer | 6 | 6
2 | (Australia) Daniela DiToro (France) Florence Gravellier | 2 | 2
