= 2009 US Open – Mixed doubles =

Tennis event results

Mixed doubles
- 2009 US Open

Final
- Champions: (United States) Carly Gullickson (United States) Travis Parrott
- Runners-up: (Zimbabwe) Cara Black (India) Leander Paes
- Score: 6–2, 6–4

Details
- Draw: 32
- Seeds: 8

Events
Singles	men	women		boys	girls
Doubles	men	women	mixed	boys	girls
WC Singles	men	women	quad
WC Doubles	men	women	quad
Legends	men	women	mixed
- US Open

Cara Black and Leander Paes were the defending champions, but were defeated by Carly Gullickson and Travis Parrott in the final 2–6, 4–6.

== Seeds ==
1. (United States) Liezel Huber / (India) Mahesh Bhupathi (semifinals)
2. (Zimbabwe) Cara Black / (India) Leander Paes (final)
3. (United States) Lisa Raymond / (Poland) Marcin Matkowski (quarterfinals)
4. (Germany) Anna-Lena Grönefeld / (The Bahamas) Mark Knowles (second round)
5. (Chinese Taipei) Hsieh Su-wei / (Zimbabwe) Kevin Ullyett (semifinals)
6. (Russia) Nadia Petrova / (Belarus) Max Mirnyi (first round)
7. (Australia) Rennae Stubbs / (Sweden) Robert Lindstedt (quarterfinals)
8. (United States) Bethanie Mattek-Sands / (Serbia) Nenad Zimonjić (quarterfinals)

== Draw ==
Key

- Q = Qualifier
- WC = Wild card
- LL = Lucky loser
- Alt = Alternate
- ITF = ITF entry
- PR = Protected ranking
- SR = Special ranking
- SE = Special exempt
- JE = Junior exempt
- JR = Junior Accelerator Programme entrant
- CO = College Accelerator Programme entrant
- NG = Next Gen Accelerator Program entrant
- w/o = Walkover
- r = Retired
- d = Defaulted

=== Finals ===
Semifinals
1	(United States) Liezel Huber (India) Mahesh Bhupathi	3	4
WC	(United States) Carly Gullickson (United States) Travis Parrott	6	6
5	(Chinese Taipei) Hsieh Su-wei (Zimbabwe) Kevin Ullyett	2	6	[5]
2	(Zimbabwe) Cara Black (India) Leander Paes	6	3	[10]

Final
WC	(United States) Carly Gullickson (United States) Travis Parrott	6	6
2	(Zimbabwe) Cara Black (India) Leander Paes	2	4

=== Top half ===
First round
1	(United States) L Huber (India) M Bhupathi	7	6
(United States) V King (Brazil) M Melo	5	0
WC	(United States) J Craybas (United States) E Butorac	6	6^{9}	[10]
WC	(United States) M Cecil (United States) D Britton	3	7^{11}	[4]
(Spain) V Ruano Pascual (Australia) S Huss	7^{9}	7
(Russia) A Kleybanova (Brazil) B Soares	6^{7}	5
WC	(United States) S Perry (United States) S Jenkins	3	2
8	(United States) B Mattek-Sands (Serbia) N Zimonjić	6	6
3	(United States) L Raymond (Poland) M Matkowski	6	6
(Austria) S Bammer (Poland) Ł Kubot	3	2
(France) A Cornet (Sweden) S Aspelin	4	5
(United States) R Kops-Jones (South Africa) J Coetzee	6	7
(Uzbekistan) A Amanmuradova (Australia) A Fisher	3	1
(India) S Mirza (Canada) D Nestor	6	6
WC	(United States) C Gullickson (United States) T Parrott	6	2	[11]
6	(Russia) N Petrova (Belarus) M Mirnyi	2	6	[9]

Second round
1	(United States) L Huber (India) M Bhupathi	6	6
WC	(United States) J Craybas (United States) E Butorac	3	3
(Spain) V Ruano Pascual (Australia) S Huss	2	4
8	(United States) B Mattek-Sands (Serbia) N Zimonjić	6	6
3	(United States) L Raymond (Poland) M Matkowski	6	6
(United States) R Kops-Jones (South Africa) J Coetzee	2	0
(India) S Mirza (Canada) D Nestor	1	4
WC	(United States) C Gullickson (United States) T Parrott	6	6

Quarterfinals
1	(United States) L Huber (India) M Bhupathi	6	6
8	(United States) B Mattek-Sands (Serbia) N Zimonjić	4	3
3	(United States) L Raymond (Poland) M Matkowski	2	5
WC	(United States) C Gullickson (United States) T Parrott	6	7

Semifinals
1	(United States) L Huber (India) M Bhupathi	3	4
WC	(United States) C Gullickson (United States) T Parrott	6	6

=== Bottom half ===
First round
5	(Chinese Taipei) S-w Hsieh (Zimbabwe) K Ullyett	7^{8}	7
WC	(United States) M Oudin (United States) R Ram	6^{6}	5
(Chinese Taipei) C-j Chuang (Germany) C Kas	3	3
(Spain) MJ Martínez Sánchez (Brazil) A Sá	6	6
(China) Z Yan (Poland) M Fyrstenberg	6^{5}	6	[10]
(Romania) M Niculescu (Romania) A Pavel	7^{7}	4	4
WC	(United States) A Haynes (United States) T Rettenmaier	2	6	[5]
4	(Germany) A-L Grönefeld (The Bahamas) M Knowles	6	4	[10]
7	(Australia) R Stubbs (Sweden) R Lindstedt	6	6
WC	(United States) A Spears (United States) R Kendrick	2	3
(Czech Republic) I Benešová (Czech Republic) L Dlouhý	7^{7}	7
(Slovakia) J Husárová (Austria) O Marach	6^{3}	5
(Italy) F Pennetta (Serbia) D Vemić	3	6	[10]
(Estonia) K Kanepi (Slovakia) M Mertiňák	6	4	[2]
(Switzerland) P Schnyder (South Africa) W Moodie	4	6	[9]
2	(Zimbabwe) C Black (India) L Paes	6	3	[11]

Second round
5	(Chinese Taipei) S-w Hsieh (Zimbabwe) K Ullyett	6	4	[10]
(Spain) MJ Martínez Sánchez (Brazil) A Sá	4	6	[7]
(China) Z Yan (Poland) M Fyrstenberg	6	6
4	(Germany) A-L Grönefeld (The Bahamas) M Knowles	3	3
7	(Australia) R Stubbs (Sweden) R Lindstedt	6	6
(Czech Republic) I Benešová (Czech Republic) L Dlouhý	3	4
(Italy) F Pennetta (Serbia) D Vemić	4	4
2	(Zimbabwe) C Black (India) L Paes	6	6

Quarterfinals
5	(Chinese Taipei) S-w Hsieh (Zimbabwe) K Ullyett	7^{7}	7^{7}
(China) Z Yan (Poland) M Fyrstenberg	6^{3}	6^{4}
7	(Australia) R Stubbs (Sweden) R Lindstedt	5	6	[6]
2	(Zimbabwe) C Black (India) L Paes	7	3	[10]

Semifinals
5	(Chinese Taipei) S-w Hsieh (Zimbabwe) K Ullyett	2	6	[5]
2	(Zimbabwe) C Black (India) L Paes	6	3	[10]
