= 2009 US Open – Women's singles =

Women's singles
- 2009 US Open

Final
- Champion: (Belgium) Kim Clijsters
- Runner-up: (Denmark) Caroline Wozniacki
- Score: 7–5, 6–3

Details
- Draw: 128
- Seeds: 32

Events
Singles	men	women		boys	girls
Doubles	men	women	mixed	boys	girls
WC Singles	men	women	quad
WC Doubles	men	women	quad
Legends	men	women	mixed
← 2008 ·	US Open	· 2010 →

Kim Clijsters defeated Caroline Wozniacki in the final, 7–5, 6–3 to win the women's singles tennis title at the 2009 US Open. It was her second US Open title and second major singles title overall. Clijsters was the first unseeded player and wild card to win the title, and the first mother to win a major since Evonne Goolagong in 1980. Following her win, she appeared at world No. 19 in the rankings. It was only Clijsters' third tournament since giving birth and coming out of retirement, and has been described as one of the most stunning championship runs in tennis history.

Serena Williams was the defending champion, but was defeated in the semifinals by Clijsters. A foot fault was called for Williams at the end of the second set, producing two match points for Clijsters. Williams argued the call and was given a point penalty for intimidating a line judge, ending the match (having already had a warning for racquet abuse earlier in the match).

Svetlana Kuznetsova's loss in the fourth round guaranteed a first time major finalist from the top half of the draw. Wozniacki was the first Danish woman to reach a major final, and the first Scandinavian woman to reach the final since Molla Bjurstedt Mallory in 1918.

This marked the final major appearance of two-time major champion Amélie Mauresmo, who lost to Aleksandra Wozniak in the second round. This was also the final major singles appearance of Ai Sugiyama, who made a record 62nd consecutive major singles appearance, losing in the first round to Samantha Stosur.

== Seeds ==
1. (Russia) Dinara Safina (third round)
2. (United States) Serena Williams (semifinals)
3. (United States) Venus Williams (fourth round)
4. (Russia) Elena Dementieva (second round)
5. (Serbia) Jelena Janković (second round)
6. (Russia) Svetlana Kuznetsova (fourth round)
7. (Russia) Vera Zvonareva (fourth round)
8. (Belarus) Victoria Azarenka (third round)
9. (Denmark) Caroline Wozniacki (final)
10. (Italy) Flavia Pennetta (quarterfinals)
11. (Serbia) Ana Ivanovic (first round)
12. (Poland) Agnieszka Radwańska (second round)
13. (Russia) Nadia Petrova (fourth round)
14. (France) Marion Bartoli (second round)
15. (Australia) Samantha Stosur (second round)
16. (France) Virginie Razzano (first round)

17. (France) Amélie Mauresmo (second round)
18. (China) Li Na (quarterfinals)
19. (Switzerland) Patty Schnyder (second round)
20. (Spain) Anabel Medina Garrigues (second round)
21. (China) Zheng Jie (third round)
22. (Slovakia) Daniela Hantuchová (fourth round)
23. (Germany) Sabine Lisicki (second round)
24. (Romania) Sorana Cîrstea (third round)
25. (Estonia) Kaia Kanepi (first round)
26. (Italy) Francesca Schiavone (fourth round)
27. (Russia) Alisa Kleybanova (first round)
28. (Austria) Sybille Bammer (first round)
29. (Russia) Maria Sharapova (third round)
30. (Ukraine) Alona Bondarenko (second round)
31. (Russia) Elena Vesnina (third round)
32. (Hungary) Ágnes Szávay (first round)

Click on the seed number of a player to go to their draw section.

== Draw ==
=== Key ===
- Q = Qualifier
- WC = Wild card
- LL = Lucky loser
- Alt = Alternate
- ITF = ITF entry
- PR = Protected ranking
- SR = Special ranking
- SE = Special exempt
- JE = Junior exempt
- JR = Junior Accelerator Programme entrant
- CO = College Accelerator Programme entrant
- NG = Next Gen Accelerator Program entrant
- w/o = Walkover
- r = Retired
- d = Defaulted

=== Finals ===
Quarterfinals
(Belgium) Yanina Wickmayer	7	6
(Ukraine) Kateryna Bondarenko	5	4
(United States) Melanie Oudin	2	2
9	(Denmark) Caroline Wozniacki	6	6
18	(China) Li Na	2	4
WC	(Belgium) Kim Clijsters	6	6
10	(Italy) Flavia Pennetta	4	3
2	(United States) Serena Williams	6	6

Semifinals
(Belgium) Yanina Wickmayer	3	3
9	(Denmark) Caroline Wozniacki	6	6
WC	(Belgium) Kim Clijsters	6	7
2	(United States) Serena Williams	4	5

Final
9	(Denmark) Caroline Wozniacki	5	3
WC	(Belgium) Kim Clijsters	7	6

=== Top half ===
==== Section 1 ====
First round
1	(Russia) D Safina	6^{5}	6	6
WC	(Australia) O Rogowska	7^{7}	2	4
(Poland) U Radwańska	4	4
(Germany) K Barrois	6	6
(Italy) T Garbin	6	6
WC	(United States) M Cecil	0	1
(Czech Republic) P Kvitová	6^{4}	6	6
27	(Russia) A Kleybanova	7^{7}	3	2
19	(Switzerland) P Schnyder	4	6	7^{8}
(Czech Republic) L Šafářová	6	3	6^{6}
(Italy) S Errani	6	6
(Netherlands) A Rus	0	3
(China) S Peng	6	6
(Australia) J Groth	2	3
(Belgium) Y Wickmayer	6	6
16	(France) V Razzano	4	3

Second round
1	(Russia) D Safina	6^{5}	6	6
(Germany) K Barrois	7^{7}	2	3
(Italy) T Garbin	1	3
(Czech Republic) P Kvitová	6	6
19	(Switzerland) P Schnyder	5	2
(Italy) S Errani	7	6
(China) S Peng	6	1	4
(Belgium) Y Wickmayer	2	6	6

Third round
1	(Russia) D Safina	4	6	6^{5}
(Czech Republic) P Kvitová	6	2	7^{7}
(Italy) S Errani	3	4
(Belgium) Y Wickmayer	6	6

Fourth round
(Czech Republic) P Kvitová	6	4	5
(Belgium) Y Wickmayer	4	6	7

==== Section 2 ====
First round
11	(Serbia) A Ivanovic	6	3	6^{7}
(Ukraine) K Bondarenko	2	6	7^{9}
Q	(United States) S Perry	6	6
(Romania) M Niculescu	4	2
Q	(Australia) A Rodionova	6	4	6
(Spain) L Domínguez Lino	0	6	1
(France) A Rezaï	6^{4}	7^{7}	1
23	(Germany) S Lisicki	7^{7}	6^{4}	6
30	(Ukraine) A Bondarenko	3	6	6
(Russia) A Kudryavtseva	6	3	2
(Argentina) G Dulko	6	5	6
(Russia) E Makarova	3	7	4
(Kazakhstan) Y Shvedova	6	6
(Slovenia) M Zec Peškirič	3	3
(Italy) R Vinci	2	3
5	(Serbia) J Janković	6	6

Second round
(Ukraine) K Bondarenko	6	6
Q	(United States) S Perry	1	1
Q	(Australia) A Rodionova	6	3	7
23	(Germany) S Lisicki	3	6	5
30	(Ukraine) A Bondarenko	4	0
(Argentina) G Dulko	6	6
(Kazakhstan) Y Shvedova	6	6^{4}	7^{8}
5	(Serbia) J Janković	3	7^{7}	6^{6}

Third round
(Ukraine) K Bondarenko	7^{7}	6
Q	(Australia) A Rodionova	6^{4}	4
(Argentina) G Dulko	6	6
(Kazakhstan) Y Shvedova	3	4

Fourth round
(Ukraine) K Bondarenko	6	6
(Argentina) G Dulko	0	0

==== Section 3 ====
First round
4	(Russia) E Dementieva	6	6
Q	(France) C Pin	1	2
(Russia) A Pavlyuchenkova	1	2
(United States) M Oudin	6	6
(Slovenia) P Hercog	3	1
WC	(United States) C McHale	6	6
(Bulgaria) T Pironkova	3	0
29	(Russia) M Sharapova	6	6
21	(China) J Zheng	6	6
(Germany) A-L Grönefeld	3	2
(France) A Cornet	4	6	7
Q	(Australia) M Adamczak	6	4	5
Q	(Czech Republic) E Hrdinová	3	3
(France) J Coin	6	6
(Slovenia) K Srebotnik	3	3
13	(Russia) N Petrova	6	6

Second round
4	(Russia) E Dementieva	7	4	3
(United States) M Oudin	5	6	6
WC	(United States) C McHale	2	1
29	(Russia) M Sharapova	6	6
21	(China) J Zheng	1	6	6
(France) A Cornet	6	3	3
(France) J Coin	4	6^{3}
13	(Russia) N Petrova	6	7

Third round
(United States) M Oudin	3	6	7
29	(Russia) M Sharapova	6	4	5
21	(China) J Zheng	4	1
13	(Russia) N Petrova	6	6

Fourth round
(United States) M Oudin	1	7^{7}	6
13	(Russia) N Petrova	6	6^{2}	3

==== Section 4 ====
First round
9	(Denmark) C Wozniacki	6	6
(Kazakhstan) G Voskoboeva	4	0
Q	(Croatia) P Martić	6	6
(France) S Brémond Beltrame	4	2
WC	(France) K Mladenovic	0	4
(Canada) S Dubois	6	6
(Japan) A Morita	1	3
24	(Romania) S Cîrstea	6	6
32	(Hungary) Á Szávay	2	2
(Israel) S Pe'er	6	6
(United States) V Lepchenko	6	3	2
(Spain) C Suárez Navarro	2	6	6
(Thailand) T Tanasugarn	3	5
(Latvia) A Sevastova	6	7
(Germany) J Görges	3	2
6	(Russia) S Kuznetsova	6	6

Second round
9	(Denmark) C Wozniacki	6	6
Q	(Croatia) P Martić	1	0
(Canada) S Dubois	4	7	4
24	(Romania) S Cîrstea	6	5	6
(Israel) S Pe'er	6	6
(Spain) C Suárez Navarro	2	0
(Latvia) A Sevastova	4	2
6	(Russia) S Kuznetsova	6	6

Third round
9	(Denmark) C Wozniacki	6	6
24	(Romania) S Cîrstea	3	2
(Israel) S Pe'er	5	1
6	(Russia) S Kuznetsova	7	6

Fourth round
9	(Denmark) C Wozniacki	2	7^{7}	7^{7}
6	(Russia) S Kuznetsova	6	6^{5}	6^{3}

=== Bottom half ===
==== Section 5 ====
First round
8	(Belarus) V Azarenka	6	6
(Romania) A Dulgheru	1	1
Q	(Poland) M Domachowska	6	2	3
Q	(Czech Republic) B Záhlavová-Strýcová	2	6	6
(Italy) A Brianti	7^{12}	1	3
(Switzerland) S Vögele	6^{10}	6	6
Q	(Austria) Y Meusburger	1	2
26	(Italy) F Schiavone	6	6
18	(China) N Li	7^{7}	6
(Romania) IR Olaru	6^{4}	3
(Portugal) M Larcher de Brito	1	7	6
(France) M Johansson	6	5	1
(Russia) M Kirilenko	6	6
Q	(Ukraine) M Koryttseva	2	1
(Austria) P Mayr	1	2
12	(Poland) A Radwańska	6	6

Second round
8	(Belarus) V Azarenka	6	6
Q	(Czech Republic) B Záhlavová-Strýcová	2	1
(Switzerland) S Vögele	4	4
26	(Italy) F Schiavone	6	6
18	(China) N Li	6	6
(Portugal) M Larcher de Brito	1	3
(Russia) M Kirilenko	6	2	6
12	(Poland) A Radwańska	4	6	4

Third round
8	(Belarus) V Azarenka	6	2	2
26	(Italy) F Schiavone	4	6	6
18	(China) N Li	6	6
(Russia) M Kirilenko	4	2

Fourth round
26	(Italy) F Schiavone	2	3
18	(China) N Li	6	6

==== Section 6 ====
First round
14	(France) M Bartoli	6	6
(Paraguay) R de los Ríos	1	0
(Ukraine) V Kutuzova	1	1
WC	(Belgium) K Clijsters	6	6
(Belgium) K Flipkens	6	6
(Australia) J Dokić	3	4
WC	(United States) G Brodsky	4	4
20	(Spain) A Medina Garrigues	6	6
25	(Estonia) K Kanepi	0	6	2
Q	(Chinese Taipei) K-c Chang	6	2	6
(Slovakia) M Rybáriková	6	4	6
Q	(Canada) V Tétreault	3	6	1
(United States) B Mattek-Sands	6	6
(Czech Republic) I Benešová	3	4
(Russia) V Dushevina	7^{7}	5	3
3	(United States) V Williams	6^{5}	7	6

Second round
14	(France) M Bartoli	7	1	2
WC	(Belgium) K Clijsters	5	6	6
(Belgium) K Flipkens	6	6
20	(Spain) A Medina Garrigues	1	3
Q	(Chinese Taipei) K-c Chang	6	2	2
(Slovakia) M Rybáriková	4	6	6
(United States) B Mattek-Sands	4	2
3	(United States) V Williams	6	6

Third round
WC	(Belgium) K Clijsters	6	6
(Belgium) K Flipkens	0	2
(Slovakia) M Rybáriková	2	5
3	(United States) V Williams	6	7

Fourth round
WC	(Belgium) K Clijsters	6	0	6
3	(United States) V Williams	0	6	4

==== Section 7 ====
First round
7	(Russia) V Zvonareva	6	6
(Spain) N Llagostera Vives	0	4
Q	(Japan) Y Sema	6	1	2
(Russia) A Chakvetadze	4	6	6
Q	(United States) Ca Gullickson	3	6^{5}
(United States) J Craybas	6	7^{7}
(Czech Republic) L Hradecká	4	6^{5}
31	(Russia) E Vesnina	6	7^{7}
17	(France) A Mauresmo	6	6
(Germany) T Malek	3	4
(Canada) A Wozniak	6	7^{9}
PR	(United States) L Granville	1	6^{7}
(Belarus) O Govortsova	2	6	3
(India) S Mirza	6	3	6
(Romania) E Gallovits	0	4
10	(Italy) F Pennetta	6	6

Second round
7	(Russia) V Zvonareva	3	6	6
(Russia) A Chakvetadze	6	1	1
(United States) J Craybas	6^{6}	1
31	(Russia) E Vesnina	7^{8}	6
17	(France) A Mauresmo	4	0
(Canada) A Wozniak	6	6
(India) S Mirza	0	0
10	(Italy) F Pennetta	6	6

Third round
7	(Russia) V Zvonareva	6	6
31	(Russia) E Vesnina	2	4
(Canada) A Wozniak	1	1
10	(Italy) F Pennetta	6	6

Fourth round
7	(Russia) V Zvonareva	6	6^{6}	0
10	(Italy) F Pennetta	3	7^{8}	6

==== Section 8 ====
First round
15	(Australia) S Stosur	6	4	6
(Japan) A Sugiyama	4	6	4
WC	(United States) V King	2
(Belarus) A Yakimova	1^{r}
(Switzerland) T Bacsinszky	6	6
Q	(Russia) V Manasieva	3	4
PR	(United States) M Shaughnessy	2	6	1
22	(Slovakia) D Hantuchová	6	4	6
28	(Austria) S Bammer	4	6	6^{5}
(Spain) MJ Martínez Sánchez	6	1	7^{7}
Q	(Germany) A Kerber	6	5	6
(Germany) A Petkovic	4	7	3
(Hungary) M Czink	6	6
(Italy) ME Camerin	3	4
WC	(United States) A Glatch	4	1
2	(United States) S Williams	6	6

Second round
15	(Australia) S Stosur	5	4
WC	(United States) V King	7	6
(Switzerland) T Bacsinszky	7	2	1
22	(Slovakia) D Hantuchová	5	6	6
(Spain) MJ Martínez Sánchez	7	6
Q	(Germany) A Kerber	5	3
(Hungary) M Czink	1	1
2	(United States) S Williams	6	6

Third round
WC	(United States) V King	2	2
22	(Slovakia) D Hantuchová	6	6
(Spain) MJ Martínez Sánchez	3	5
2	(United States) S Williams	6	7

Fourth round
22	(Slovakia) D Hantuchová	2	0
2	(United States) S Williams	6	6

== Championship match statistics ==
Category	(Belgium) Clijsters	(Denmark) Wozniacki
1st serve %	53/85 (62%)	43/63 (68%)
1st serve points won	33 of 53 = 62%	23 of 43 = 53%
2nd serve points won	15 of 32 = 47%	6 of 20 = 30%
Total service points won	48 of 85 = 56.47%	29 of 63 = 46.03%
Aces	3	0
Double faults	2	3
Winners	36	10
Unforced errors	34	21
Net points won	11 of 15 = 73%	9 of 15 = 60%
Break points converted	5 of 8 = 63%	3 of 12 = 25%
Return points won	34 of 63 = 54%	37 of 85 = 44%
Total points won	82	66

Preceded by 2009 Wimbledon Championships – Women's singles	Grand Slam women's singles	Succeeded by 2010 Australian Open – Women's singles
