= 2009 US Open – Wheelchair quad singles =

Wheelchair quad singles
- 2009 US Open

Final
- Champion: (United Kingdom) Peter Norfolk
- Runner-up: (United States) David Wagner
- Score: 6–3, 3–6, 6–3

Events
Singles	men	women		boys	girls
Doubles	men	women	mixed	boys	girls
WC Singles	men	women	quad
WC Doubles	men	women	quad
Legends	men	women	mixed
← 2007 ·	US Open	· 2010 →

Defending champion Peter Norfolk defeated David Wagner in the final, 6–3, 3–6, 6–3 to win the quad singles wheelchair tennis title at the 2009 US Open.

The event was not held in 2008 due to a schedule conflict with the 2008 Summer Paralympics, an issue that would continue to affect US Open wheelchair tennis until 2021.

== Draw ==
=== Key ===
- Q = Qualifier
- WC = Wild card
- LL = Lucky loser
- Alt = Alternate
- SE = Special exempt
- PR = Protected ranking
- ITF = ITF entry
- JE = Junior exempt
- w/o = Walkover
- r = Retired
- d = Defaulted
- SR = Special ranking

=== Final ===
Final
(United Kingdom) Peter Norfolk	6	3	6
(United States) David Wagner	3	6	3

=== Round robin ===
		(United Kingdom) Norfolk	(Sweden) Andersson	(United States) Wagner	(United States) Taylor	RR W–L	Set W–L	Game W–L	Standings
	(United Kingdom) Peter Norfolk		6–4, 6–0	Cancelled	6–1, 6–2	2-0	4-0	24-7	1
	(Sweden) Johan Andersson	4–6, 0–6		2–6, 6–7^{(5–7)}	4–6, 3–6	0-3	0-6	19-37	4
	(United States) David Wagner	Cancelled	6–2, 7–6^{(7–5)}		6–1, 6–1	2-0	4-0	25-10	2
WC	(United States) Nicholas Taylor	1–6, 2–6	6–4, 6–3	1–6, 1–6		1-2	2-4	17-31	3

Standings are determined by: 1. number of wins; 2. number of matches; 3. in two-players-ties, head-to-head records; 4. in three-players-ties, percentage of sets won, or of games won; 5. steering-committee decision.
