= 2010 Pilot Pen Tennis – Women's doubles =

Women's doubles
- 2010 Pilot Pen Tennis

Final
- Champions: (Czech Republic) Květa Peschke (Slovenia) Katarina Srebotnik
- Runners-up: (United States) Bethanie Mattek-Sands (United States) Meghann Shaughnessy
- Score: 7–5, 6–0

Events
Singles	men	women
Doubles	men	women
← 2009 ·	Pilot Pen Tennis	· 2011 →

Nuria Llagostera Vives and María José Martínez Sánchez were the defending champions but Llagostera Vives chose not to participate this year.
As a result, Martínez Sánchez partnered with Arantxa Parra Santonja but they lost 6–2, 6–1 in quarterfinals to Anabel Medina Garrigues and Yan Zi.
Květa Peschke and Katarina Srebotnik won in the final against Bethanie Mattek-Sands and Meghann Shaughnessy, 7–5, 6–0.

== Seeds ==
1. (Czech Republic) Květa Peschke / (Slovenia) Katarina Srebotnik (champions)
2. (United States) Lisa Raymond / (Australia) Rennae Stubbs (first round)
3. (United States) Vania King / (Kazakhstan) Yaroslava Shvedova (first round)
4. (Zimbabwe) Cara Black / (Australia) Anastasia Rodionova (first round)

== Draw ==
=== Key ===
- Q = Qualifier
- WC = Wild card
- LL = Lucky loser
- Alt = Alternate
- SE = Special exempt
- PR = Protected ranking
- ITF = ITF entry
- JE = Junior exempt
- w/o = Walkover
- r = Retired
- d = Defaulted
- SR = Special ranking

=== Main draw ===
First round
1	(Czech Republic) K Peschke (Slovenia) K Srebotnik	6	6
(Argentina) G Dulko (Turkey) İ Şenoğlu	2	3
(Italy) S Errani (Italy) R Vinci	4	7	[7]
(Poland) K Jans (Belarus) T Poutchek	6	6^{6}	[10]
4	(Zimbabwe) C Black (Australia) A Rodionova	4	6	[10]
(Spain) A Medina Garrigues (China) Z Yan	6	3	[12]
(Switzerland) T Bacsinszky (Poland) A Rosolska	3	6	[2]
(Spain) MJ Martínez Sánchez (Spain) A Parra Santonja	6	3	[10]
(Russia) M Kondratieva (Czech Republic) V Uhlířová	2	6^{7}
(Chinese Taipei) S-w Hsieh (China) S Peng	6	7
(Chinese Taipei) C-j Chuang (Belarus) O Govortsova	6	7
3	(United States) V King (Kazakhstan) Y Shvedova	4	6^{4}
WC	(United States) C McHale (United States) R Zalameda	4	4
(United States) B Mattek-Sands (United States) M Shaughnessy	6	6
(United States) R Kops-Jones (Russia) A Kudryavtseva	5	6	[10]
2	(United States) L Raymond (Australia) R Stubbs	7	2	[5]

Quarterfinals
1	(Czech Republic) K Peschke (Slovenia) K Srebotnik	6	7
(Poland) K Jans (Belarus) T Poutchek	2	5
(Spain) A Medina Garrigues (China) Z Yan	6	6
(Spain) MJ Martínez Sánchez (Spain) A Parra Santonja	2	1
(Chinese Taipei) S-w Hsieh (China) S Peng	7	3	[10]
(Chinese Taipei) C-j Chuang (Belarus) O Govortsova	5	6	[8]
(United States) B Mattek-Sands (United States) M Shaughnessy	6	6
(United States) R Kops-Jones (Russia) A Kudryavtseva	4	4

Semifinals
1	(Czech Republic) K Peschke (Slovenia) K Srebotnik	7	5	[10]
(Spain) A Medina Garrigues (China) Z Yan	6^{4}	7	[6]
(Chinese Taipei) S-w Hsieh (China) S Peng	5	1
(United States) B Mattek-Sands (United States) M Shaughnessy	7	6

Final
1	(Czech Republic) K Peschke (Slovenia) K Srebotnik	7	6
(United States) B Mattek-Sands (United States) M Shaughnessy	5	0
