= 2009 Pilot Pen Tennis =

- Date: August 21–29
- Edition: 41st
- Surface: Hard / outdoor
- Location: New Haven, Connecticut, U.S.
- Venue: Cullman-Heyman Tennis Center

Champions

Men's singles
- (Spain) Fernando Verdasco

Women's singles
- (Denmark) Caroline Wozniacki

Men's doubles
- (Austria) Julian Knowle / (Austria) Jürgen Melzer

Women's doubles
- (Spain) Nuria Llagostera Vives / (Spain) María José Martínez Sánchez
← 2008 ·	Pilot Pen Tennis	· 2010 →

The 2009 Pilot Pen Tennis was a tennis tournament played on outdoor hard courts. It was the 41st edition of the Pilot Pen Tennis, and was part of the ATP World Tour 250 Series of the 2009 ATP World Tour, and of the Premier Series of the 2009 WTA Tour. It took place at the Cullman-Heyman Tennis Center in New Haven, Connecticut, United States, from August 21 through August 29, 2009. It was the last event on the 2009 US Open Series before the 2009 US Open.

== Finals ==
=== Men's singles ===
(Spain) Fernando Verdasco defeated (United States) Sam Querrey, 6–4, 7–6^{(8–6)}

- It was Verdasco's first title of the year and third of his career.

=== Women's singles ===
(Denmark) Caroline Wozniacki defeated (Russia) Elena Vesnina, 6–2, 6–4

- It was Wozniacki's third title of the year, and the sixth of her career. It was her second win at the event, also winning in 2008.

=== Men's doubles ===
(Austria) Julian Knowle / (Austria) Jürgen Melzer defeated (Brazil) Bruno Soares / (Zimbabwe) Kevin Ullyett, 6–4, 7–6^{(7–3)}

=== Women's doubles ===
(Spain) Nuria Llagostera Vives / (Spain) María José Martínez Sánchez defeated (Czech Republic) Iveta Benešová / (Czech Republic) Lucie Hradecká, 6–2, 7–5.

== ATP entrants ==
=== Seeds ===
Country	Player	Rank^{1}	Seed
RUS	Nikolay Davydenko	8	1
ESP	Fernando Verdasco	10	2
ESP	Tommy Robredo	16	3
ESP	David Ferrer	19	4
USA	Mardy Fish	22	5
USA	Sam Querrey	26	6
RUS	Igor Andreev	27	7
ROU	Victor Hănescu	28	8
ESP	Nicolás Almagro	33	9
FRA	Jérémy Chardy	35	10
AUT	Jürgen Melzer	37	11
GER	Philipp Petzschner	39	12
GER	Andreas Beck	40	13
RUS	Igor Kunitsyn	43	14
FRA	Fabrice Santoro	44	15
ITA	Andreas Seppi	45	16

- ^{1} Seeds are based on the rankings of August 17, 2009

=== Other entrants ===
The following players received wildcards into the singles main draw

- (Cyprus) Marcos Baghdatis
- (United States) Taylor Dent
- (United States) Rajeev Ram
- (Spain) Fernando Verdasco

The following players received entry from the qualifying draw:

- (Uruguay) Pablo Cuevas
- (Portugal) Frederico Gil
- (Ecuador) Nicolás Lapentti
- (Denmark) Frederik Nielsen

The following player received the lucky loser spot:

- (Belgium) Olivier Rochus

== WTA entrants ==
=== Seeds ===
Country	Player	Rank^{1}	Seed
RUS	Svetlana Kuznetsova	6	1
DEN	Caroline Wozniacki	8	2
ITA	Flavia Pennetta	10	3
RUS	Nadia Petrova	12	4
POL	Agnieszka Radwańska	13	5
FRA	Marion Bartoli	14	6
SVK	Dominika Cibulková	15	7
FRA	Amélie Mauresmo	16	8
AUS	Samantha Stosur	17	9

- ^{1} Seeds are based on the rankings of August 17, 2009
- Dominika Cibulková was forced withdrew due to right rib injury, so Samantha Stosur became the no. 9 seed.

=== Other entrants ===
The following players received wildcards into the singles main draw

- (Russia) Svetlana Kuznetsova
- (Russia) Nadia Petrova
- (United States) Meghann Shaughnessy

The following players received entry from the qualifying draw:

- (Romania) Ioana Raluca Olaru
- (Slovakia) Magdaléna Rybáriková
- (Italy) Roberta Vinci
- (Belgium) Yanina Wickmayer

The following players received the lucky loser spots:

- (Romania) Edina Gallovits
- (United States) Varvara Lepchenko

Preceded by Cincinnati	2009 US Open Series; Men's Events	Succeeded by New York – US Open
Preceded by Toronto	2009 US Open Series; Women's Events	Succeeded by New York – US Open
