= 2010 Pilot Pen Tennis – Men's doubles =

Men's doubles
- 2010 Pilot Pen Tennis

Final
- Champion: (Sweden) Robert Lindstedt (Romania) Horia Tecău
- Runner-up: (India) Rohan Bopanna (Pakistan) Aisam-ul-Haq Qureshi
- Score: 6–4, 7–5

Events
Singles	men	women
Doubles	men	women
← 2009 ·	Pilot Pen Tennis	· 2011 →

Julian Knowle and Jürgen Melzer were the defending champions, but Melzer chose not to participate this year.
As a result, Knowle partnered with Andy Ram, but they lost to Robert Lindstedt and Horia Tecău in the semifinals. Lindstedt and Tecău went on to win the tournament, after defeating Rohan Bopanna and Aisam-ul-Haq Qureshi in the final 6–4, 7–5.

== Seeds ==
1. (Canada) Daniel Nestor / (Serbia) Nenad Zimonjić (quarterfinals)
2. (India) Mahesh Bhupathi / (Belarus) Max Mirnyi (semifinals)
3. (Poland) Łukasz Kubot / (Austria) Oliver Marach (first round)
4. (Poland) Mariusz Fyrstenberg / (Poland) Marcin Matkowski (first round)

== Draw ==
=== Key ===
- Q = Qualifier
- WC = Wild card
- LL = Lucky loser
- Alt = Alternate
- SE = Special exempt
- PR = Protected ranking
- ITF = ITF entry
- JE = Junior exempt
- w/o = Walkover
- r = Retired
- d = Defaulted
- SR = Special ranking

First round
1	(Canada) D Nestor (Serbia) N Zimonjić	6	6
(United States) E Butorac (United States) T Parrott	2	2
(Austria) J Knowle (Israel) A Ram	6	7
(Brazil) M Melo (Brazil) B Soares	1	6^{4}
3	(Poland) Ł Kubot (Austria) O Marach	7	1	[7]
(Sweden) R Lindstedt (Romania) H Tecău	5	6	[10]
WC	(United States) N Paige (United States) M Powers	4	2
(South Africa) W Moodie (Belgium) D Norman	6	6
(Germany) M Berrer (Germany) F Mayer	4	6	[8]
(Kazakhstan) A Golubev (Uzbekistan) D Istomin	6	3	[10]
(India) R Bopanna (Pakistan) A-u-H Qureshi	6	2	[10]
4	(Poland) M Fyrstenberg (Poland) M Matkowski	3	6	[5]
(Argentina) JI Chela (Uruguay) P Cuevas	7	4	[10]
(Sweden) J Brunström (Germany) M Kohlmann	6^{1}	6	[6]
(Czech Republic) F Čermák (Slovakia) M Mertiňák	6	6^{1}	[4]
2	(India) M Bhupathi (Belarus) M Mirnyi	3	7	[10]

Quarterfinals
1	(Canada) D Nestor (Serbia) N Zimonjić	7	6^{7}	[4]
(Austria) J Knowle (Israel) A Ram	6^{2}	7	[10]
(Sweden) R Lindstedt (Romania) H Tecău	7	6
(South Africa) W Moodie (Belgium) D Norman	6^{6}	2
(Kazakhstan) A Golubev (Uzbekistan) D Istomin	3	6^{1}
(India) R Bopanna (Pakistan) A-u-H Qureshi	6	7
(Argentina) JI Chela (Uruguay) P Cuevas	2	3
2	(India) M Bhupathi (Belarus) M Mirnyi	6	6

Semifinals
(Austria) J Knowle (Israel) A Ram	4	3
(Sweden) R Lindstedt (Romania) H Tecău	6	6
(India) R Bopanna (Pakistan) A-u-H Qureshi	6	6
2	(India) M Bhupathi (Belarus) M Mirnyi	4	4

Final
(Sweden) R Lindstedt (Romania) H Tecău	6	7
(India) R Bopanna (Pakistan) A-u-H Qureshi	4	5
