= 2009 Pilot Pen Tennis – Women's singles =

Women's singles
- 2009 Pilot Pen Tennis

Final
- Champion: (Denmark) Caroline Wozniacki
- Runner-up: (Russia) Elena Vesnina
- Score: 6–2, 6–4

Details
- Draw: 32
- Seeds: 8

Events
Singles	men	women
Doubles	men	women
- Pilot Pen Tennis

Caroline Wozniacki was the reigning champion, and successfully defended the title, defeating Elena Vesnina 6–2, 6–4 in the final.

== Seeds ==
1. (Russia) Svetlana Kuznetsova (quarterfinals)
2. (Denmark) Caroline Wozniacki (champion)
3. (Italy) Flavia Pennetta (semifinals)
4. (Russia) Nadia Petrova (first round)
5. (Poland) Agnieszka Radwańska (second round; retired due to right hand injury)
6. (France) Marion Bartoli (second round; retired due to a left adductor strain)
7. (Slovakia) Dominika Cibulková (withdrew due to right rib injury)
8. (France) Amélie Mauresmo (semifinals)
9. (Australia) Samantha Stosur (second round)

== Draw ==
Key

- Q = Qualifier
- WC = Wild card
- LL = Lucky loser
- Alt = Alternate
- ITF = ITF entry
- PR = Protected ranking
- SR = Special ranking
- SE = Special exempt
- JE = Junior exempt
- JR = Junior Accelerator Programme entrant
- CO = College Accelerator Programme entrant
- NG = Next Gen Accelerator Program entrant
- w/o = Walkover
- r = Retired
- d = Defaulted

=== Finals ===
Semifinals
8	(France) Amélie Mauresmo	7	1	2
(Russia) Elena Vesnina	5	6	6
3	(Italy) Flavia Pennetta	4	1
2	(Denmark) Caroline Wozniacki	6	6

Final
(Russia) Elena Vesnina	2	4
2	(Denmark) Caroline Wozniacki	6	6

=== Top half ===
First round
1/WC	(Russia) S Kuznetsova	6	6^{5}	6
(China) J Zheng	1	7	4
Q	(Belgium) Y Wickmayer	3	6	6
(Russia) A Kleybanova	6	1	4
(Ukraine) A Bondarenko	4	6	7
WC	(United States) M Shaughnessy	6	3	5
(Japan) A Sugiyama	4	1
8	(France) A Mauresmo	6	6
4/WC	(Russia) N Petrova	6	6^{4}	4
(Russia) A Chakvetadze	0	7	6
(Austria) S Bammer	7	6
(Spain) A Medina Garrigues	5	4
(Russia) E Vesnina	7	6
(Argentina) G Dulko	6^{6}	2
(France) A Cornet	7	2	4
9	(Australia) S Stosur	6^{8}	6	6

Second round
1/WC	(Russia) S Kuznetsova	6	5	7
Q	(Belgium) Y Wickmayer	4	7	6^{2}
(Ukraine) A Bondarenko	1	1
8	(France) A Mauresmo	6	6
(Russia) A Chakvetadze	4	6	7
(Austria) S Bammer	6	4	5
(Russia) E Vesnina	3	6	6
9	(Australia) S Stosur	6	3	4

Quarterfinals
1/WC	(Russia) S Kuznetsova	6^{9}	6	3
8	(France) A Mauresmo	7	2	6
(Russia) A Chakvetadze	1	5
(Russia) E Vesnina	6	7

Semifinals
8	(France) A Mauresmo	7	1	2
(Russia) E Vesnina	5	6	6

=== Bottom half ===
First round
6	(France) M Bartoli	4	6	6
(Spain) MJ Martínez Sánchez	6	3	1
(Italy) F Schiavone	4	4
Q	(Slovakia) M Rybáriková	6	6
(Czech Republic) I Benešová	4	6	6
LL	(United States) V Lepchenko	6	2	1
Q	(Romania) IR Olaru	1	2
3	(Italy) F Pennetta	6	6
5	(Poland) A Radwańska	2	6	7
Q	(Italy) R Vinci	6	2	6^{5}
(Switzerland) P Schnyder	3	6	3
(France) V Razzano	6	3	6
(Russia) E Makarova	3	3
(Russia) A Pavlyuchenkova	6	6
LL	(Romania) E Gallovits	0	0
2	(Denmark) C Wozniacki	6	6

Second round
6	(France) M Bartoli	6	6^{5}	0^{r}
Q	(Slovakia) M Rybáriková	1	7	2
(Czech Republic) I Benešová	6^{1}	4
3	(Italy) F Pennetta	7	6
5	(Poland) A Radwańska	6	4	r
(France) V Razzano	3	6
(Russia) A Pavlyuchenkova	1	4
2	(Denmark) C Wozniacki	6	6

Quarterfinals
Q	(Slovakia) M Rybáriková	2	2
3	(Italy) F Pennetta	6	6
(France) V Razzano	4	3
2	(Denmark) C Wozniacki	6	6

Semifinals
3	(Italy) F Pennetta	4	1
2	(Denmark) C Wozniacki	6	6
