= 2010 Pilot Pen Tennis – Men's singles =

Men's singles
- 2010 Pilot Pen Tennis

Final
- Champion: (Ukraine) Sergiy Stakhovsky
- Runner-up: (Uzbekistan) Denis Istomin
- Score: 3–6, 6–3, 6–4

Events
Singles	men	women
Doubles	men	women
← 2009 ·	Pilot Pen Tennis	· 2011 →

Fernando Verdasco was the defending champion, but chose not to compete in 2010.
Sergiy Stakhovsky won in the final against Denis Istomin, 3–6, 6–3, 6–4.

== Seeds ==
All seeds received a bye into the second round.

1. (Cyprus) Marcos Baghdatis (quarterfinals)
2. (Brazil) Thomaz Bellucci (second round)
3. (Chile) Fernando González (second round)
4. (United States) Mardy Fish (withdrew due to fatigue)
5. (Kazakhstan) Andrey Golubev (third round)
6. (Spain) Tommy Robredo (third round)
7. (Ukraine) Alexandr Dolgopolov (third round)
8. (Germany) Florian Mayer (third round)
9. (Ukraine) Sergiy Stakhovsky (champion)
10. (Serbia) Viktor Troicki (semifinals)
11. (Belgium) Xavier Malisse (second round, retired)
12. (Netherlands) Thiemo de Bakker (semifinals)
13. (Germany) Michael Berrer (second round)
14. (Argentina) Juan Ignacio Chela (third round)
15. (Uzbekistan) Denis Istomin (final)
16. (Romania) Victor Hănescu (third round)

== Draw ==
=== Key ===
- Q = Qualifier
- WC = Wild card
- LL = Lucky loser
- Alt = Alternate
- SE = Special exempt
- PR = Protected ranking
- ITF = ITF entry
- JE = Junior exempt
- w/o = Walkover
- r = Retired
- d = Defaulted
- SR = Special ranking

=== Finals ===
Quarterfinals
1	(Cyprus) Marcos Baghdatis	7	1	6^{4}
9	(Ukraine) Sergiy Stakhovsky	5	6	7
(Kazakhstan) Evgeny Korolev	4	3
12	(Netherlands) Thiemo de Bakker	6	6
10	(Serbia) Viktor Troicki	6	6
LL	(Czech Republic) Radek Štěpánek	2	3
Q	(Russia) Teymuraz Gabashvili	1	6	6^{8}
15	(Uzbekistan) Denis Istomin	6	3	7

Semifinals
9	(Ukraine) Sergiy Stakhovsky	6	6
12	(Netherlands) Thiemo de Bakker	3	4
10	(Serbia) Viktor Troicki	6^{10}	6	2
15	(Uzbekistan) Denis Istomin	7	3	6

Final
9	(Ukraine) Sergiy Stakhovsky	3	6	6
15	(Uzbekistan) Denis Istomin	6	3	4

=== Top half ===
==== Section 1 ====
First round
(Russia) I Andreev	7	6
(France) A Clément	6^{2}	3
(France) S Robert	1	2
WC	(United States) D Young	6	6
(Australia) P Luczak	6	7
(Argentina) L Mayer	3	6^{4}
WC	(United States) T Dent	7	4	6
(Argentina) E Schwank	6^{1}	6	0

Second round
1	(Cyprus) M Baghdatis	6	6
(Russia) I Andreev	2	4
WC	(United States) D Young	7	4	0
14	(Argentina) J Chela	5	6	6
9	(Ukraine) S Stakhovsky	2	7	7
(Australia) P Luczak	6	6^{5}	6^{1}
WC	(United States) T Dent	7	4	4
6	(Spain) T Robredo	5	6	6

Third round
1	(Cyprus) M Baghdatis	1	6	6
14	(Argentina) J Chela	6	3	2
9	(Ukraine) S Stakhovsky	7	6
6	(Spain) T Robredo	6^{5}	2

Quarterfinals
1	(Cyprus) M Baghdatis	7	1	6^{4}
9	(Ukraine) S Stakhovsky	5	6	7

==== Section 2 ====
First round
(Germany) A Beck	7	3	3
(Ukraine) I Marchenko	6^{4}	6	6
(Portugal) F Gil	4	2
(Kazakhstan) E Korolev	6	6
(Germany) S Greul	3	4
Q	(Kazakhstan) M Kukushkin	6	6
(Czech Republic) J Hájek	7	6
Q	(Jamaica) D Brown	5	3

Second round
Q	(Canada) P Bester	3	3
(Ukraine) I Marchenko	6	6
(Kazakhstan) E Korolev	6	7
13	(Germany) M Berrer	4	5
12	(Netherlands) T de Bakker	6	6^{6}	6
Q	(Kazakhstan) M Kukushkin	1	7	4
(Czech Republic) J Hájek	3	1
8	(Germany) F Mayer	6	6

Third round
(Ukraine) I Marchenko	6^{5}	4
(Kazakhstan) E Korolev	7	6
12	(Netherlands) T de Bakker	6^{2}	6	7
8	(Germany) F Mayer	7	1	5

Quarterfinals
(Kazakhstan) E Korolev	4	3
12	(Netherlands) T de Bakker	6	6

=== Bottom half ===
==== Section 3 ====
First round
WC	(United States) J Blake	6	6
(Spain) P Riba	0	1
(Italy) A Seppi	3	4
(Finland) J Nieminen	6	6
(Poland) Ł Kubot	4	6	5
(Germany) D Brands	6	2	7
LL	(Czech Republic) R Štěpánek	6	6
(Uruguay) P Cuevas	0	4

Second round
7	(Ukraine) A Dolgopolov	6	6
WC	(United States) J Blake	4	2
(Finland) J Nieminen	5	3
10	(Serbia) V Troicki	7	6
16	(Romania) V Hănescu	6	6
(Germany) D Brands	3	4
LL	(Czech Republic) R Štěpánek	6	6
3/WC	(Chile) F González	2	4

Third round
7	(Ukraine) A Dolgopolov	7	6^{1}	2
10	(Serbia) V Troicki	6^{4}	7	6
16	(Romania) V Hănescu	6^{4}	7	4
LL	(Czech Republic) R Štěpánek	7	6^{4}	6

Quarterfinals
10	(Serbia) V Troicki	6	6
LL	(Czech Republic) R Štěpánek	2	3

==== Section 4 ====
First round
PR	(Argentina) M González	6	6
(Argentina) H Zeballos	3	4
(Italy) P Starace	6^{3}	5
Q	(Russia) T Gabashvili	7	7
(Switzerland) M Chiudinelli	6^{3}	3
(Germany) B Becker	7	6
(Slovakia) L Lacko	6	7
(France) F Serra	1	6^{6}

Second round
5	(Kazakhstan) A Golubev	6	2	6
PR	(Argentina) M González	3	6	2
Q	(Russia) T Gabashvili	4
11	(Belgium) X Malisse	2	r
15	(Uzbekistan) D Istomin	6	6
(Germany) B Becker	3	1
(Slovakia) L Lacko	6	6^{4}	6
2	(Brazil) T Bellucci	4	7	0

Third round
5	(Kazakhstan) A Golubev	3	6	6^{7}
Q	(Russia) T Gabashvili	6	3	7
15	(Uzbekistan) D Istomin	6	2	6
(Slovakia) L Lacko	2	6	3

Quarterfinals
Q	(Russia) T Gabashvili	1	6	6^{8}
15	(Uzbekistan) D Istomin	6	3	7
