= 2009 Pilot Pen Tennis – Men's doubles =

Men's doubles
- 2009 Pilot Pen Tennis

Final
- Champions: (Austria) Julian Knowle (Austria) Jürgen Melzer
- Runners-up: (Brazil) Bruno Soares (Zimbabwe) Kevin Ullyett
- Score: 6-4, 7-6(3)

Events
Singles	men	women
Doubles	men	women
← 2008 ·	Pilot Pen Tennis	· 2010 →

Marcelo Melo and André Sá were the defending champions, but lost in the semifinals against Julian Knowle and Jürgen Melzer.

Julian Knowle and Jürgen Melzer won in the final 6–4, 7-6(3) against Bruno Soares and Kevin Ullyett.

== Seeds ==
1. (Poland) Mariusz Fyrstenberg / (Poland) Marcin Matkowski (first round)
2. (Brazil) Bruno Soares / (Zimbabwe) Kevin Ullyett (final)
3. (Czech Republic) František Čermák / (Slovakia) Michal Mertiňák (quarterfinals)
4. (Czech Republic) Martin Damm / (Sweden) Robert Lindstedt (semifinals)

== Draw ==
=== Key ===
- Q = Qualifier
- WC = Wild card
- LL = Lucky loser
- Alt = Alternate
- SE = Special exempt
- PR = Protected ranking
- ITF = ITF entry
- JE = Junior exempt
- w/o = Walkover
- r = Retired
- d = Defaulted
- SR = Special ranking

First round
1	(Poland) M Fyrstenberg (Poland) M Matkowski	5	3
(Germany) C Kas (Germany) P Petzschner	7	6
(Austria) O Marach (Czech Republic) D Škoch	3	4
(Austria) J Knowle (Austria) J Melzer	6	6
3	(Czech Republic) F Čermák (Slovakia) M Mertiňák	7	4	[10]
(South Africa) W Moodie (Romania) H Tecău	6^{4}	6	[7]
(Australia) S Huss (United Kingdom) R Hutchins	5	3
(Brazil) M Melo (Brazil) A Sá	7	6
(Australia) P Hanley (Australia) J Kerr	6	6
WC	(United States) D Martin (United States) R Ram	2	3
WC	(United States) R Kendrick (United States) S Lipsky	5	4
4	(Czech Republic) M Damm (Sweden) R Lindstedt	7	6
(United States) T Parrott (Slovakia) F Polášek	4	6	[7]
(France) J Chardy (France) F Santoro	6	3	[10]
(United States) E Butorac (South Africa) J Coetzee	3	3
2	(Brazil) B Soares (Zimbabwe) K Ullyett	6	6

Quarterfinals
(Germany) C Kas (Germany) P Petzschner	6^{2}	6	[8]
(Austria) J Knowle (Austria) J Melzer	7	4	[10]
3	(Czech Republic) F Čermák (Slovakia) M Mertiňák	3	4
(Brazil) M Melo (Brazil) A Sá	6	6
(Australia) P Hanley (Australia) J Kerr	2	6	[6]
4	(Czech Republic) M Damm (Sweden) R Lindstedt	6	3	[10]
(France) J Chardy (France) F Santoro	1	6^{3}
2	(Brazil) B Soares (Zimbabwe) K Ullyett	6	7

Semifinals
(Austria) J Knowle (Austria) J Melzer	6	7
(Brazil) M Melo (Brazil) A Sá	4	5
4	(Czech Republic) M Damm (Sweden) R Lindstedt	3	4
2	(Brazil) B Soares (Zimbabwe) K Ullyett	6	6

Final
(Austria) J Knowle (Austria) J Melzer	6	7
2	(Brazil) B Soares (Zimbabwe) K Ullyett	4	6^{3}
