= 2009 US Open (tennis) =

- Date: August 31 – September 14
- Edition: 129th
- Category: Grand Slam (ITF)
- Surface: Hardcourt
- Location: New York City, U.S.
- Venue: USTA Billie Jean King National Tennis Center

Champions

Men's singles
- (Argentina) Juan Martín del Potro

Women's singles
- (Belgium) Kim Clijsters

Men's doubles
- (Czech Republic) Lukáš Dlouhý / (India) Leander Paes

Women's doubles
- (United States) Serena Williams / (United States) Venus Williams

Mixed doubles
- (United States) Carly Gullickson / (United States) Travis Parrott

Wheelchair men's singles
- (Japan) Shingo Kunieda

Wheelchair women's singles
- (Netherlands) Esther Vergeer

Wheelchair quad singles
- (United Kingdom) Peter Norfolk

Wheelchair men's doubles
- (France) Stéphane Houdet / (Sweden) Stefan Olsson

Wheelchair women's doubles
- (Netherlands) Korie Homan / (Netherlands) Esther Vergeer

Wheelchair quad doubles
- (United States) Nicholas Taylor / (United States) David Wagner

Boys' singles
- (Australia) Bernard Tomic

Girls' singles
- (United Kingdom) Heather Watson

Boys' doubles
- (Hungary) Márton Fucsovics / (Chinese Taipei) Hsieh Cheng-peng

Girls' doubles
- (Russia) Valeria Solovieva / (Ukraine) Maryna Zanevska
- US Open

The 2009 US Open was a tennis tournament played on outdoor hard courts, held from August 31 to September 14, 2009, in the USTA Billie Jean King National Tennis Center at Flushing Meadows, New York City, United States. Originally, it was scheduled to end with the men's singles final match on Sunday, September 13, but due to rain the tournament was extended by one day. Like the Australian Open, the tournament featured night matches.

Former World No. 1 and 2005 US Open women's singles champion, Kim Clijsters, competed in the 2009 US Open after being granted a wild card entry, returning to professional tennis after more than two years of retirement. She made it to the women's singles semi-finals, where she knocked out the defending champion Serena Williams in controversial circumstances. In the final, Clijsters defeated Caroline Wozniacki, the first Dane, man or woman, to reach a Grand Slam final in the Open Era, in straight sets: 7–5, 6–3. Clijsters thus became the first mother to win a Grand Slam since Evonne Goolagong Cawley in 1980. In the process, she also became the first unseeded player and wildcard to win the tournament.

In the men's singles final, five-time defending champion Roger Federer lost to Argentina's Juan Martín del Potro in a match lasting over four hours.

== Arthur Ashe Kids' Day ==
The Arthur Ashe Kids' Day was held on August 29, 2009, prior to the start of the tournament. It featured an exhibition tennis match involving American player Andy Roddick and Great Britain's Andy Murray, who were joined by actor and comedian Will Ferrell. American Idol winner Jordin Sparks performed her hit single "Battlefield", along with rising stars Honor Society and Justin Bieber. There were also tennis matches and contests featuring Serena Williams, Ana Ivanovic Andy Roddick, Roger Federer, Maria Sharapova, Kim Clijsters, and James Blake. The popular tennis and music festival, which included interactive games, musical entertainment and tennis clinics, was hosted by television personalities Susie Castillo and Quddus.

== Singles players ==
Men's singles

Champion		Runner-up	
(Argentina) Juan Martín del Potro [6]		(Switzerland) Roger Federer [1]	
Semifinals out
(Serbia) Novak Djokovic [4]		(Spain) Rafael Nadal [3]	
Quarterfinals out
(Sweden) Robin Söderling [12]	(Spain) Fernando Verdasco [10]	(Chile) Fernando González [11]	(Croatia) Marin Čilić [16]
4th round out
(Spain) Tommy Robredo [14]	(Russia) Nikolay Davydenko [8]	(Czech Republic) Radek Štěpánek [15]	(United States) John Isner
(France) Jo-Wilfried Tsonga [7]	(France) Gaël Monfils [13]	(Spain) Juan Carlos Ferrero [24]	(United Kingdom) Andy Murray [2]
3rd round out
(Australia) Lleyton Hewitt [31]	(United States) James Blake [21]	(United States) Sam Querrey [22]	(Switzerland) Marco Chiudinelli (Q)
(United States) Jesse Witten (Q)	(Germany) Philipp Kohlschreiber [23]	(Germany) Tommy Haas [20]	(United States) Andy Roddick [5]
(France) Julien Benneteau	(Czech Republic) Tomáš Berdych [17]	(Argentina) José Acasuso	(Spain) Nicolás Almagro [32]
(Austria) Daniel Köllerer	(France) Gilles Simon [9]	(Uzbekistan) Denis Istomin	(United States) Taylor Dent (WC)
2nd round out
(Germany) Simon Greul	(Argentina) Juan Ignacio Chela (PR)	(Belgium) Olivier Rochus	(Spain) Guillermo García López
(Spain) Marcel Granollers	(United States) Kevin Kim	(Russia) Mikhail Youzhny	(Czech Republic) Jan Hernych
(Australia) Carsten Ball (Q)	(Argentina) Máximo González	(India) Somdev Devvarman (Q)	(Argentina) Leonardo Mayer
(France) Florent Serra	(United States) Robert Kendrick	(Turkey) Marsel İlhan (Q)	(France) Marc Gicquel
(Finland) Jarkko Nieminen	(Serbia) Viktor Troicki [30]	(Argentina) Horacio Zeballos (Q)	(France) Josselin Ouanna (Q)
(Germany) Andreas Beck	(Spain) David Ferrer [18]	(United States) Robby Ginepri	(Germany) Nicolas Kiefer
(Austria) Jürgen Melzer	(Uruguay) Pablo Cuevas	(Germany) Philipp Petzschner	(Brazil) Thomaz Bellucci (Q)
(United States) Jesse Levine (WC)	(Ecuador) Nicolás Lapentti	(Spain) Iván Navarro	(Chile) Paul Capdeville
1st round out
(United States) Devin Britton (WC)	(Ecuador) Giovanni Lapentti (Q)	(Spain) Óscar Hernández	(Brazil) Thiago Alves
(Spain) Rubén Ramírez Hidalgo	(Russia) Igor Kunitsyn	(Canada) Peter Polansky (Q)	(United States) Donald Young (Q)
(Spain) Albert Montañés	(Germany) Mischa Zverev	(Israel) Dudi Sela	(United States) Michael Yani (Q)
(France) Paul-Henri Mathieu [26]	(Italy) Potito Starace	(Germany) Rainer Schüttler	(Germany) Dieter Kindlmann (Q)
(Croatia) Ivan Ljubičić	(Argentina) Juan Pablo Brzezicki (Q)	(Slovakia) Karol Beck	(Russia) Igor Andreev [29]
(Italy) Andreas Seppi	(Portugal) Fred Gil	(Kazakhstan) Andrey Golubev	(Italy) Simone Bolelli
(Germany) Benjamin Becker	(Serbia) Janko Tipsarević	(Argentina) Martín Vassallo Argüello	(Colombia) Alejandro Falla (Q)
(Romania) Victor Hănescu [28]	(Belgium) Christophe Rochus	(Russia) Dmitry Tursunov	(Germany) Björn Phau
(United States) Chase Buchanan (WC)	(Italy) Fabio Fognini	(Italy) Flavio Cipolla	(Australia) Peter Luczak (LL)
(United States) Wayne Odesnik	(Germany) Michael Berrer (Q)	(United States) Rajeev Ram	(Chile) Nicolás Massú
(France) Jérémy Chardy	(Russia) Evgeny Korolev	(Brazil) Marcos Daniel	(Spain) Alberto Martín
(Belgium) Steve Darcis	(Romania) Andrei Pavel (PR)	(France) Michaël Llodra (WC)	(France) Richard Gasquet
(Argentina) Juan Mónaco	(Russia) Marat Safin	(Australia) Chris Guccione (WC)	(Portugal) Rui Machado (LL)
(France) Fabrice Santoro	(Ukraine) Sergiy Stakhovsky	(Chinese Taipei) Lu Yen-hsun	(Spain) Daniel Gimeno Traver
(United States) Ryan Sweeting (WC)	(Russia) Teymuraz Gabashvili	(United States) Brendan Evans (WC)	(Switzerland) Stan Wawrinka [19]
(Croatia) Ivo Karlović [27]	(Spain) Feliciano López	(Romania) Victor Crivoi	(Latvia) Ernests Gulbis

Women's singles

Champion		Runner-up	
(Belgium) Kim Clijsters (WC)		(Denmark) Caroline Wozniacki [9]	
Semifinals out
(Belgium) Yanina Wickmayer		(United States) Serena Williams [2]	
Quarterfinals out
(Ukraine) Kateryna Bondarenko	(United States) Melanie Oudin	(China) Li Na [18]	(Italy) Flavia Pennetta [10]
4th round out
(Czech Republic) Petra Kvitová	(Argentina) Gisela Dulko	(Russia) Nadia Petrova [13]	(Russia) Svetlana Kuznetsova [6]
(Italy) Francesca Schiavone [26]	(United States) Venus Williams [3]	(Russia) Vera Zvonareva [7]	(Slovakia) Daniela Hantuchová [22]
3rd round out
(Russia) Dinara Safina [1]	(Italy) Sara Errani	(Australia) Anastasia Rodionova (Q)	(Kazakhstan) Yaroslava Shvedova
(Russia) Maria Sharapova [29]	(China) Zheng Jie [21]	(Romania) Sorana Cîrstea [24]	(Israel) Shahar Pe'er
(Belarus) Victoria Azarenka [8]	(Russia) Maria Kirilenko	(Belgium) Kirsten Flipkens	(Slovakia) Magdaléna Rybáriková
(Russia) Elena Vesnina [31]	(Canada) Aleksandra Wozniak	(United States) Vania King (WC)	(Spain) María José Martínez Sánchez
2nd round out
(Germany) Kristina Barrois	(Italy) Tathiana Garbin	(Switzerland) Patty Schnyder [19]	(China) Peng Shuai
(United States) Shenay Perry (Q)	(Germany) Sabine Lisicki [23]	(Ukraine) Alona Bondarenko [30]	(Serbia) Jelena Janković [5]
(Russia) Elena Dementieva [4]	(Spain) Carla Suárez Navarro	(France) Alizé Cornet	(France) Julie Coin
(Croatia) Petra Martić (Q)	(Canada) Stéphanie Dubois	(United States) Christina McHale (WC)	(Latvia) Anastasija Sevastova
(Czech Republic) Barbora Záhlavová-Strýcová (Q)	(Switzerland) Stefanie Vögele	(Portugal) Michelle Larcher de Brito	(Poland) Agnieszka Radwańska [12]
(France) Marion Bartoli [14]	(Spain) Anabel Medina Garrigues [20]	(Chinese Taipei) Chang Kai-chen (Q)	(United States) Bethanie Mattek-Sands
(Russia) Anna Chakvetadze	(United States) Jill Craybas	(France) Amélie Mauresmo [17]	(India) Sania Mirza
(Australia) Samantha Stosur [15]	(Switzerland) Timea Bacsinszky	(Germany) Angelique Kerber (Q)	(Hungary) Melinda Czink
1st round out
(Australia) Olivia Rogowska (WC)	(Poland) Urszula Radwańska	(United States) Mallory Cecil (WC)	(Russia) Alisa Kleybanova [27]
(Czech Republic) Lucie Šafářová	(Netherlands) Arantxa Rus	(Australia) Jarmila Groth	(France) Virginie Razzano [16]
(Serbia) Ana Ivanovic [11]	(Romania) Monica Niculescu	(Spain) Lourdes Domínguez Lino	(France) Aravane Rezaï
(Russia) Alla Kudryavtseva	(Russia) Ekaterina Makarova	(Slovenia) Maša Zec Peškirič	(Italy) Roberta Vinci
(France) Camille Pin (Q)	(Russia) Anastasia Pavlyuchenkova	(Slovenia) Polona Hercog	(Bulgaria) Tsvetana Pironkova
(Germany) Anna-Lena Grönefeld	(Australia) Monique Adamczak (Q)	(Czech Republic) Eva Hrdinová (Q)	(Slovenia) Katarina Srebotnik
(Kazakhstan) Galina Voskoboeva	(France) Séverine Brémond Beltrame	(France) Kristina Mladenovic (WC)	(Japan) Ayumi Morita
(Hungary) Ágnes Szávay [32]	(United States) Varvara Lepchenko	(Thailand) Tamarine Tanasugarn	(Germany) Julia Görges
(Romania) Alexandra Dulgheru	(Poland) Marta Domachowska (Q)	(Italy) Alberta Brianti	(Austria) Yvonne Meusburger (Q)
(Romania) Raluca Olaru	(France) Mathilde Johansson	(Ukraine) Mariya Koryttseva (Q)	(Austria) Patricia Mayr
(Paraguay) Rossana de los Ríos	(Ukraine) Viktoriya Kutuzova	(Australia) Jelena Dokić	(United States) Gail Brodsky (WC)
(Estonia) Kaia Kanepi [25]	(Canada) Valérie Tétreault (Q)	(Czech Republic) Iveta Benešová	(Russia) Vera Dushevina
(Spain) Nuria Llagostera Vives	(Japan) Yurika Sema (Q)	(United States) Carly Gullickson (Q)	(Czech Republic) Lucie Hradecká
(Germany) Tatjana Malek	(United States) Laura Granville (PR)	(Belarus) Olga Govortsova	(Romania) Edina Gallovits
(Japan) Ai Sugiyama	(Belarus) Anastasiya Yakimova	(Russia) Vesna Manasieva (Q)	(United States) Meghann Shaughnessy (PR)
(Austria) Sybille Bammer [28]	(Germany) Andrea Petkovic	(Italy) Maria Elena Camerin	(United States) Alexa Glatch (WC)

== Player of the day ==
- Day 1: (Belgium) Kim Clijsters, for winning her first match at the US Open in 4 years.
- Day 2: (United States) Jesse Witten, for defeating 29th-seeded (Russia) Igor Andreev 6–4, 6–0, 6–2 his first career win at a Grand Slam at the age of 26 and ranked 276.
- Day 3: (Italy) Flavia Pennetta, for defeating (India) Sania Mirza 6–0, 6–0, which was her third consecutive 6–0 set.
- Day 4: (United States) Melanie Oudin, ranked 70th, for eliminating world #4 (Russia) Elena Dementieva, after losing the first set and overcoming a thigh injury to win the final set.
- Day 5: (Italy) Francesca Schiavone, for defeating #8 seed (Belarus) Victoria Azarenka despite losing the first set.
- Day 6: (United States) Melanie Oudin, for defeating former world #1 and the 29th seed (Russia) Maria Sharapova, losing the first set and winning 7–5 in the third.
- Day 7: (France) Jo-Wilfried Tsonga, For reaching the round of 16 for the first time, and for not dropping a set to this point.
- Day 8: (Ukraine) Kateryna Bondarenko, for beating (Argentina) Gisela Dulko in only 47 minutes 6–0, 6–0, advancing to her first grand slam quarterfinal.
- Day 9: (Croatia) Marin Čilić, for defeating ATP No. 2 (United Kingdom) Andy Murray in three sets.
- Day 10: (Belgium) Yanina Wickmayer, for defeating (Ukraine) Kateryna Bondarenko in straight sets and becoming the second Belgian player in the semifinals.
- Day 11: (Argentina) Juan Martín del Potro, for defeating (Croatia) Marin Čilić in four sets to advance to the semifinals of the US Open for the first time.
- Day 12: No matches played due to rain.
- Day 13: (Denmark) Caroline Wozniacki, for beating (Belgium) Yanina Wickmayer 6–3, 6–3 in the semifinals, thus becoming the first Dane, man or woman, to reach a Grand Slam final in the Open Era.
- Day 14: (Switzerland) Roger Federer, for beating (Serbia) Novak Djokovic in the semifinals 7–6^{(7–3)}, 7–5, 7–5, thus reaching his 21st Grand Slam and 6th consecutive US Open final.
- Day 15: (Argentina) Juan Martín del Potro, for winning his first Grand Slam title, ending (Switzerland) Roger Federer's streak of consecutive US Open championships at five.

== Day-by-day summaries ==
=== Day 1 (August 31) ===
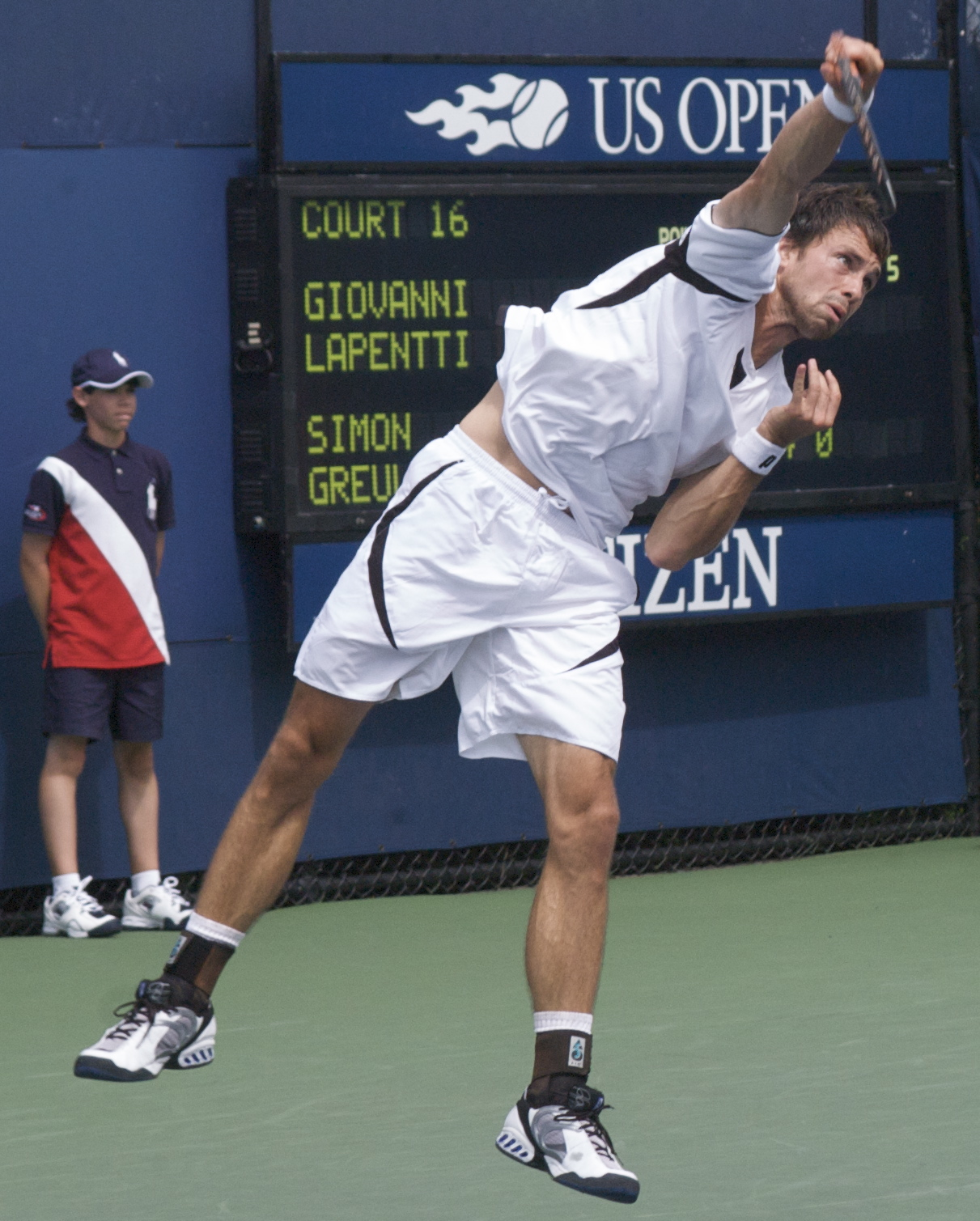
Simon Greul serving to Giovanni Lapentti in Round 1

The first day of the tournaments saw many seeds get through pretty easily in straight sets: Roger Federer, James Blake, Lleyton Hewitt, Nikolay Davydenko and Radek Štěpánek. The day also produced a couple of upsets, when Mikhail Youzhny continued 26th seeded Paul-Henri Mathieu's horrible US Open record by beating him in four. While, tall American John Isner did the same to 28th seeded Victor Hănescu by ending the Romanian's 2009 bid in three with the second set going to a tie-break 16–14. The exciting day continued with a couple of five-set marathons, with Simon Greul defeating Giovanni Lapentti, Guillermo García López out-lasting Peter Polansky, and Jan Hernych surviving against Rainer Schüttler. The days last match featured America's hope Andy Roddick prevailing over Björn Phau in straight sets in a match that started at 11:00 pm.

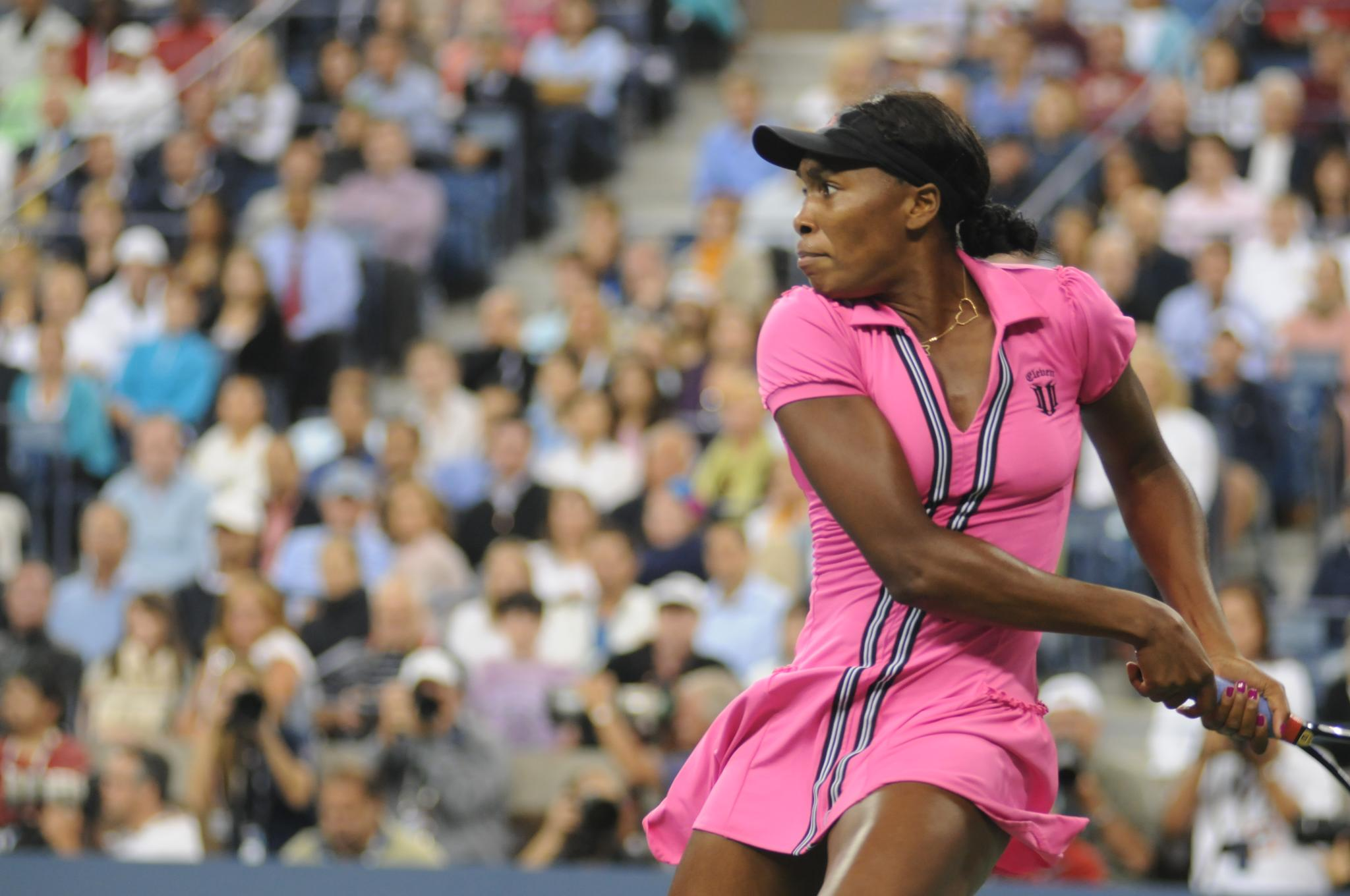
Venus Williams returns against Vera Dushevina on the opening day

On the women's side, former world no. 1 Kim Clijsters opened the play, winning over Viktoriya Kutuzova losing only two games. Joining her were defending 2009 Wimbledon and Australian Open champion Serena Williams, Amélie Mauresmo, Victoria Azarenka, Flavia Pennetta, Elena Vesnina, Agnieszka Radwańska, Li Na and Marion Bartoli who all won in two sets. Australian Samantha Stosur was pushed by veteran player Ai Sugiyama in three sets, Daniela Hantuchová got past American Meghann Shaughnessy in three as well. In the first night match, Venus Williams was able to claw her way to avoid an upset to win against Russian Vera Dushevina in a very close three-setter. Venus committed four foot faults in the match. With Venus and Serena getting past the first round, a few American players saw success on the women's side with Vania King, Bethanie Mattek-Sands, and Jill Craybas getting to the second round. Austrian and 28th seeded Sybille Bammer, who defeated Serena Williams in Cincinnati, and 25th seeded Kaia Kanepi were the only casualties of the day.

- Seeds out:
  - Men's singles: (France) Paul-Henri Mathieu [26], (Romania) Victor Hănescu [28]
  - Women's singles: (Estonia) Kaia Kanepi [25], (Austria) Sybille Bammer [28]
- Schedule of play

Matches on main courts
Matches on Arthur Ashe Stadium
Event	Winner	Loser	Score
Women's singles – 1st round	(Belgium) Kim Clijsters [WC]	(Ukraine) Viktoriya Kutuzova	6–1, 6–1
Men's singles – 1st round	(Switzerland) Roger Federer [1]	(United States) Devin Britton [WC]	6–1, 6–3, 7–5
Women's singles – 1st round	(United States) Serena Williams [2]	(United States) Alexa Glatch [WC]	6–4, 6–1
2009 US Open Opening Night Ceremony
Women's singles – 1st round	(United States) Venus Williams [3]	(Russia) Vera Dushevina	6–7^{(5–7)}, 7–5, 6–3
Men's singles – 1st round	(United States) Andy Roddick [5]	(Germany) Björn Phau	6–1, 6–4, 6–2
Matches on Louis Armstrong Stadium
Event	Winner	Loser	Score
Women's singles – 1st round	(Belarus) Victoria Azarenka [8]	(Romania) Alexandra Dulgheru	6–1, 6–1
Men's singles – 1st round	(United States) John Isner	(Romania) Victor Hănescu [28]	6–1, 7–6^{(16–14)}, 7–6^{(7–5)}
Women's singles – 1st round	(France) Amélie Mauresmo [17]	(Germany) Tatjana Malek	6–3, 6–4
Men's singles – 1st round	(United States) James Blake [21]	(Spain) Rubén Ramírez Hidalgo	6–1, 6–4, 7–5
Women's singles – 1st round	(Slovakia) Daniela Hantuchová [22]	(United States) Meghann Shaughnessy [PR]	6–2, 4–6, 6–1
Matches on the Grandstand
Event	Winner	Loser	Score
Men's singles – 1st round	(Russia) Mikhail Youzhny	(France) Paul-Henri Mathieu [26]	2–6, 7–5, 6–0, 6–2
Women's singles – 1st round	(Italy) Flavia Pennetta	(Romania) Edina Gallovits	6–0, 6–4
Women's singles – 1st round	(Russia) Vera Zvonareva [7]	(Spain) Nuria Llagostera Vives	6–0, 6–4
Men's singles – 1st round	(Australia) Lleyton Hewitt [31]	(Brazil) Thiago Alves	6–0, 6–3, 6–4
Colored background indicates a night match

=== Day 2 (September 1) ===
On the men's side, many seeded players got through in straight sets: 2008 US Open runner-up Andy Murray, 2008 Australian Open Champion Novak Djokovic, Tomáš Berdych, Jo-Wilfried Tsonga, Fernando González, and Fernando Verdasco. No. 30 seed Victor Troicki survived a five-set scare, 6–3, 6–3, 1–6, 2–6, 6–1. However, some seeds failed to be as lucky and fell in the first round with Ivo Karlović falling to Iván Navarro and Igor Andreev falling to American Jesse Witten, both in straight sets, while Stan Wawrinka fell in five. American players were once again successful, with 5 out of the 11 getting past the first round: Sam Querrey, Kevin Kim, Jesse Witten, Jesse Levine, and Taylor Dent.

On the women's side, the first major upset of the tournament occurred with Ukrainian Kateryna Bondarenko upsetting 11th seed and former world no. 1 Ana Ivanovic. Ivanovic committed 50 unforced errors. In the second round, her sister Alona Bondarenko, 2009 French Open champion Svetlana Kuznetsova, Maria Sharapova, Elena Dementieva, Nadia Petrova and Tathiana Garbin all advanced. Other seeded players that were eliminated in the first round were 32nd seed Ágnes Szávay, losing to Israeli Shahar Pe'er in straight sets, Alisa Kleybanova, losing to Petra Kvitová in three and Virginie Razzano losing to Yanina Wickmayer in straight sets. Day 2 was a good day for women American players with three out of five getting through: Melanie Oudin, Shenay Perry, and Christina McHale. However, world no. 1 Dinara Safina struggled in her match against Olivia Rogowska but manage to survive, winning in three sets

On the doubles side, the day was led by 2nd seeded Daniel Nestor and Nenad Zimonjić, who won in straight sets, and the only seeds that were eliminated were No. 15 seed Stephen Huss and Ross Hutchins.

- Seeds out:
  - Men's singles: (Switzerland) Stan Wawrinka [19], (Croatia) Ivo Karlović [27], (Russia) Igor Andreev [29]
  - Women's singles: (Serbia) Ana Ivanovic [11], (France) Virginie Razzano [16], (Russia) Alisa Kleybanova [27], (Hungary) Ágnes Szávay [32]
  - Men's doubles: (Australia) Stephen Huss / (United Kingdom) Ross Hutchins [15]
- Schedule of play

Matches on main courts
Matches on Arthur Ashe Stadium
Event	Winner	Loser	Score
Women's singles – 1st round	(Russia) Svetlana Kuznetsova [6]	(Germany) Julia Görges	6–3, 6–2
Women's singles – 1st round	(Russia) Dinara Safina [1]	(Australia) Olivia Rogowska [WC]	6–7^{(5–7)}, 6–2, 6–4
Men's singles – 1st round	(Serbia) Novak Djokovic [4]	(Croatia) Ivan Ljubičić	6–3, 6–1, 6–3
Women's singles – 1st round	(Russia) Maria Sharapova [29]	(Bulgaria) Tsvetana Pironkova	6–3, 6–0
Men's singles – 1st round	(United Kingdom) Andy Murray [2]	(Latvia) Ernests Gulbis	7–5, 6–3, 7–5
Matches on Louis Armstrong Stadium
Event	Winner	Loser	Score
Women's singles – 1st round	(Denmark) Caroline Wozniacki [9]	(Kazakhstan) Galina Voskoboeva	6–4, 6–0
Men's singles – 1st round	(Czech Republic) Tomáš Berdych [17]	(United States) Wayne Odesnik	7–5, 6–4, 6–4
Women's singles – 1st round	(Serbia) Jelena Janković [5]	(Italy) Roberta Vinci	6–2, 6–3
Men's singles – 1st round	(United States) Sam Querrey [22]	(United States) Michael Yani [Q]	6–3, 7–5, 6–4
Women's singles – 1st round	(Ukraine) Kateryna Bondarenko	(Serbia) Ana Ivanovic [11]	2–6, 6–3, 7–6^{(9–7)}
Matches on the Grandstand
Event	Winner	Loser	Score
Men's singles – 1st round	(France) Jo-Wilfried Tsonga [7]	(United States) Chase Buchanan [WC]	6–0, 6–2, 6–1
Women's singles – 1st round	(United States) Melanie Oudin	(Russia) Anastasia Pavlyuchenkova	6–1, 6–2
Men's singles – 1st round	(Croatia) Marin Čilić [16]	(United States) Ryan Sweeting	7–6^{(7–2)}, 6–4, 7–6^{(7–4)}
Women's singles – 1st round	(Russia) Elena Dementieva [4]	(France) Camille Pin [Q]	6–1, 6–2
Colored background indicates a night match

=== Day 3 (September 2) ===
The men's side saw Rafael Nadal playing his first match at the 2009 US Open and winning against his friend Richard Gasquet. He was joined by no. 1 seed Roger Federer, Juan Martín del Potro, Gaël Monfils, Lleyton Hewitt, Juan Carlos Ferrero, and Gilles Simon, who all won in straight sets, while David Ferrer, Nicolás Almagro and American Robby Ginepri won in 4. Joining them was Austrian Jürgen Melzer, who defeated Marat Safin in Safin's last Grand Slam match.

On the women's side, upsets continued with Amélie Mauresmo falling to Aleksandra Wozniak, Anabel Medina Garrigues losing to Kirsten Flipkens, and dark horse favorite Australian Samantha Stosur losing to American Vania King, all in straight sets, while Marion Bartoli and Agnieszka Radwańska both fell to resurging players Kim Clijsters and Maria Kirilenko in three. However, the day also saw half of the seeds getting through easily and was led by former champion Venus Williams and Flavia Pennetta, who won in double bagel, Victoria Azarenka, Francesca Schiavone, Elena Vesnina, and Li Na. The day ended for the first time in over 30 years in the US Open history by a women's match, which saw Serena Williams dispatching Melinda Czink in just 53 minutes.

On the doubles side, there were a couple of major upsets: sixth seeded Mariusz Fyrstenberg and Marcin Matkowski, fell in their opening round, as well as unseeded world no. 8 in doubles Lisa Raymond and her partner Shenay Perry.

- Seeds out:
  - Women's singles: (Poland) Agnieszka Radwańska [12], (France) Marion Bartoli [14], (Australia) Samantha Stosur [15], (France) Amélie Mauresmo [17], (Spain) Anabel Medina Garrigues [20]
  - Men's doubles: (Poland) Mariusz Fyrstenberg / (Poland) Marcin Matkowski [6], (Australia) Ashley Fisher / (Australia) Jordan Kerr [14]
  - Women's doubles: (United States) Raquel Kops-Jones / (United States) Abigail Spears [15]
- Schedule of play

Matches on main courts
Matches on Arthur Ashe Stadium
Event	Winner	Loser	Score
Women's singles – 2nd round	(Canada) Aleksandra Wozniak	(France) Amélie Mauresmo [17]	6–4, 6–0
Women's singles – 2nd round	(United States) Venus Williams [3]	(United States) Bethanie Mattek-Sands	6–4, 6–2
Men's singles – 1st round	(Spain) Rafael Nadal [3]	(France) Richard Gasquet	6–2, 6–2, 6–3
Men's singles – 2nd round	(Switzerland) Roger Federer [1]	(Germany) Simon Greul	6–3, 7–5, 7–5
Women's singles – 2nd round	(United States) Serena Williams [2]	(Hungary) Melinda Czink	6–1, 6–1
Matches on Louis Armstrong Stadium
Event	Winner	Loser	Score
Women's singles – 2nd round	(Italy) Flavia Pennetta [10]	(India) Sania Mirza	6–0, 6–0
Men's singles – 1st round	(Austria) Jürgen Melzer	(Russia) Marat Safin	1–6, 6–4, 6–3, 6–4
Women's singles – 2nd round	(Belgium) Kim Clijsters [WC]	(France) Marion Bartoli [14]	5–7, 6–1, 6–2
Men's singles – 1st round	(Argentina) Juan Martín del Potro [6]	(Argentina) Juan Mónaco	6–3, 6–3, 6–1
Matches on the Grandstand
Event	Winner	Loser	Score
Men's singles – 1st round	(France) Gaël Monfils [13]	(France) Jérémy Chardy	6–1, 6–4, 6–3
Women's singles – 2nd round	(Russia) Vera Zvonareva [7]	(Russia) Anna Chakvetadze	3–6, 6–1, 6–1
Women's singles – 2nd round	(Belarus) Victoria Azarenka [8]	(Czech Republic) Barbora Záhlavová-Strýcová [Q]	6–2, 6–1
Women's singles – 2nd round	(United States) Vania King [WC]	(Australia) Samantha Stosur [15]	7–5, 6–4
Men's singles – 2nd round	(Australia) Lleyton Hewitt [31]	(Argentina) Juan Ignacio Chela [PR]	6–3, 6–3, 6–4
Colored background indicates a night match

=== Day 4 (September 3) ===
Day 4 continued the success of the top men's seeds, with no. 4 seed Novak Djokovic dispatching Carsten Ball 6–2, 6–4, 6–4. He was joined by 2009 French Open runner-up Robin Söderling, 2009 French Open semifinalist Tommy Haas, 2009 Hamburg Open Champion Nikolay Davydenko, Philipp Kohlschreiber, and Tommy Robredo. The Americans once again took advantage of their home court, with four of them winning their matches: James Blake surviving against Olivier Rochus in four, with Blake committing 53 unforced errors, John Isner, Jesse Witten, and Sam Querrey. Andy Roddick once again got through easily against Marc Gicquel 6–1, 6–4, 6–4. He produced 33 winners and only 10 unforced errors in the last match of the night.

The women's side received a lot of buzz, with 17-year-old American Melanie Oudin upsetting hot favorite and US Open Series champion Elena Dementieva in the second round. Yaroslava Shvedova of Kazakhstan upset last year's runner-up Jelena Janković in three sets. Seeded players who joined Dementieva and Janković were Alona Bondarenko, who lost to Gisela Dulko, and Patty Schnyder, who lost in straight sets, while Sabine Lisicki lost in three to the last Australian and qualifier on the draw Anastasia Rodionova. No. 1 seed Dinara Safina once again survived a scare from Kristina Barrois, winning 6(5)–7, 6–2, 6–3. However, a few seeded players got through quite easily, led by Russians Svetlana Kuznetsova, Maria Sharapova, Nadia Petrova, and Danish player Caroline Wozniacki. Unseeded players who got through in straight sets were Kateryna Bondarenko, who eliminated Ivanovic, Shahar Pe'er, Sara Errani, and Petra Kvitová.

On the doubles side, it was the opposite, with all of the women's doubles seeds getting through. However, on the men's side, the highest seeded players who fell were no. 9 seeded Łukasz Kubot and Oliver Marach, losing to veteran doubles players Leoš Friedl and Jaroslav Levinský.

- Seeds out:
  - Women's singles: (Russia) Elena Dementieva [4], (Serbia) Jelena Janković [5], (Switzerland) Patty Schnyder [19], (Germany) Sabine Lisicki [23], (Ukraine) Alona Bondarenko [30]
  - Men's doubles: (Poland) Łukasz Kubot / (Austria) Oliver Marach [9], (Sweden) Simon Aspelin / (Australia) Paul Hanley [12], (United States) Travis Parrott / (Slovakia) Filip Polášek [13]
- Schedule of play

Matches on main courts
Matches on Arthur Ashe Stadium
Event	Winner	Loser	Score
Women's singles – 2nd round	(United States) Melanie Oudin	(Russia) Elena Dementieva [4]	5–7, 6–4, 6–3
Women's singles – 2nd round	(Kazakhstan) Yaroslava Shvedova	(Serbia) Jelena Janković [5]	6–3, 6–7^{(4–7)}, 7–6^{(8–6)}
Men's singles – 2nd round	(United States) James Blake [21]	(Belgium) Olivier Rochus	6–4, 3–6, 7–6^{(8–6)}, 6–3
Women's singles – 2nd round	(Russia) Maria Sharapova [29]	(United States) Christina McHale [WC]	6–2, 6–1
Men's singles – 2nd round	(United States) Andy Roddick [5]	(France) Marc Gicquel	6–1, 6–4, 6–4
Matches on Louis Armstrong Stadium
Event	Winner	Loser	Score
Women's singles – 2nd round	(Russia) Dinara Safina [1]	(Germany) Kristina Barrois	6–7^{(5–7)}, 6–2, 6–3
Men's singles – 2nd round	(United States) Sam Querrey [22]	(United States) Kevin Kim	7–5, 6–7^{(6–8)}, 6–4, 6–4
Women's singles – 2nd round	(Russia) Svetlana Kuznetsova [6]	(Latvia) Anastasija Sevastova	6–4, 6–2
Men's singles – 2nd round	(Serbia) Novak Djokovic [4]	(Australia) Carsten Ball [Q]	6–3, 6–4, 6–4
Matches on the Grandstand
Event	Winner	Loser	Score
Men's singles – 2nd round	(Germany) Tommy Haas [20]	(United States) Robert Kendrick	6–4, 6–4, 7–6^{(7–3)}
Women's singles – 2nd round	(Denmark) Caroline Wozniacki [9]	(Croatia) Petra Martić	6–1, 6–0
Women's doubles – 1st round	(United States) Serena Williams [4] (United States) Venus Williams [4]	(Germany) Julia Görges (Spain) Arantxa Parra Santonja	6–2, 6–2
Men's doubles – 1st round	(United States) Bob Bryan [1] (United States) Mike Bryan [1]	(Argentina) José Acasuso (Argentina) Martín Vassallo Argüello	6–3, 6–4
Men's singles – 2nd round	(United States) John Isner	(Turkey) Marsel İlhan [Q]	6–3, 6–4, 7–6^{(7–1)}
Colored background indicates a night match

=== Day 5 (September 4) ===
The fifth day of the US Open saw many seeds struggle on the men's side, with no. 30 seed Viktor Troicki losing to Julien Benneteau in four sets, and no. 18 seed David Ferrer losing to José Acasuso in five sets. This day also saw Rafael Nadal and Andy Murray struggle with their matches, with both of them being pushed to four sets. A couple of seeds were also pushed to four: Tomáš Berdych and Fernando González. No. 24 seed Juan Carlos Ferrero and no. 16 seed Marin Čilić both survived their matches, despite losing the first two sets. Many victors were pushed to five sets: Nicolás Almagro, a returning Taylor Dent, and Denis Istomin. Although many seeds struggled, French seeds got through easily with Jo-Wilfried Tsonga, Gaël Monfils, and Gilles Simon winning their matches on straight sets. They were joined by Argentine Juan Martín del Potro, who also won in straight sets.

On the women's side, Victoria Azarenka lost to Italian Francesca Schiavone in three sets after Azarenka double-faulted on a match point. The rest of the matches were all won in straight sets, led by Serena Williams, who defeated María José Martínez Sánchez, who had a controversial match at the 2009 French Open. She was joined by Daniela Hantuchová, who crushed American Vania King, Li Na, Kim Clijsters, Flavia Pennetta, and Venus Williams. Elena Vesnina lost to 7th seed Vera Zvonareva.

On the women's side, seventh seeded Hsieh Su-wei and Peng Shuai were ousted by the American team of Alexa Glatch and Carly Gullickson. They were followed by no. 14 seed Sania Mirza and Francesca Schiavone, who lost to Shahar Pe'er and Gisela Dulko in a tight three-setter.

- Seeds out:
  - Men's singles: (Spain) David Ferrer [18], (Serbia) Viktor Troicki [30]
  - Women's singles: (Belarus) Victoria Azarenka [8], (Russia) Elena Vesnina [31]
  - Women's doubles: (Chinese Taipei) Hsieh Su-wei / (China) Peng Shuai [7], (India) Sania Mirza / (Italy) Francesca Schiavone [14]
  - Mixed doubles: (Russia) Nadia Petrova / (Belarus) Max Mirnyi [6]
- Schedule of play

Matches on main courts
Matches on Arthur Ashe Stadium
Event	Winner	Loser	Score
Women's singles – 3rd round	(Slovakia) Daniela Hantuchová [22]	(United States) Vania King [WC]	6–2, 6–2
Women's singles – 3rd round	(United States) Serena Williams [2]	(Spain) María José Martínez Sánchez	6–3, 7–5
Men's singles – 2nd round	(United Kingdom) Andy Murray [2]	(Chile) Paul Capdeville	6–2, 3–6, 6–0, 6–2
Women's singles – 3rd round	(United States) Venus Williams [3]	(Slovakia) Magdaléna Rybáriková	6–2, 7–5
Men's singles – 2nd round	(Spain) Rafael Nadal [3]	(Germany) Nicolas Kiefer	6–0, 3–6, 6–3, 6–4
Matches on Louis Armstrong Stadium
Event	Winner	Loser	Score
Women's singles – 3rd round	(Italy) Flavia Pennetta [10]	(Canada) Aleksandra Wozniak	6–1, 6–1
Men's singles – 2nd round	(Argentina) Juan Martín del Potro [6]	(Austria) Jürgen Melzer	7–6^{(8–6)}, 6–3, 6–3
Men's singles – 2nd round	(Spain) Nicolás Almagro [32]	(United States) Robby Ginepri	6–7^{(7–9)}, 6–2, 6–3, 4–6, 6–4
Women's singles – 3rd round	(Belgium) Kim Clijsters [WC]	(Belgium) Kirsten Flipkens	6–0, 6–2
Matches on the Grandstand
Event	Winner	Loser	Score
Men's singles – 2nd round	(France) Jo-Wilfried Tsonga [7]	(Finland) Jarkko Nieminen	7–5, 6–3, 6–4
Women's singles – 3rd round	(Italy) Francesca Schiavone [26]	(Belarus) Victoria Azarenka [8]	4–6, 6–2, 6–2
Women's singles – 3rd round	(China) Li Na [18]	(Russia) Maria Kirilenko	6–4, 6–2
Men's singles – 2nd round	(United States) Taylor Dent	(Spain) Iván Navarro	6–4, 5–7, 6–7^{(1–7)}, 7–5, 7–6^{(11–9)}
Colored background indicates a night match

=== Day 6 (September 5) ===
Five-time defending champion Swiss Roger Federer took out the 2001 Champion Lleyton Hewitt in four sets after losing the first to set up a match-up with Spaniard Tommy Robredo in the fourth round, who beat American James Blake in three sets. Swede Robin Söderling took out the young American Sam Querrey in four sets in order to advance to face Russian Nikolay Davydenko in the fourth round, who won his match against Swiss qualifier Marco Chiudinelli in straight sets. One-time slam champion Novak Djokovic won in a four-set match after losing the first set against American qualifier Jesse Witten in order to advance to the fourth round against Czech Radek Štěpánek, who won in a match against German Philipp Kohlschreiber in four sets after losing the first. Spaniard Fernando Verdasco sent German Tommy Haas packing in a brutal five-set match, Verdasco met American John Isner in the next round because Isner eliminated the 2003 champion Andy Roddick from the tournament in another five-set battle.

American Melanie Oudin defeated three-time slam champion and 2006 US Open Champion Russian Maria Sharapova in three sets, losing the first and winning the next two to advance into the fourth round. Russian Nadia Petrova defeated Chinese Zheng Jie 6–4, 6–1 to set up a match with Melanie Oudin in the fourth round. Danish Caroline Wozniacki took out doubles partner Romanian Sorana Cîrstea in the third round in 6–3, 6–2, which allowed her to set up a match with Svetlana Kuznetsova in the fourth round, after Kuznetsova beat Israeli Shahar Pe'er 7–5, 6–1. Ukrainian Kateryna Bondarenko bested Australian qualifier Anastasia Rodionova in the third round 7-6^{(7–4)}, 6–4, which allowed her to meet Argentine Gisela Dulko, who beat Kazakhstan's Yaroslava Shvedova 6–3, 6–4. Czech Petra Kvitová took down top-seeded world no. 1 Russian Dinara Safina in three up-and-down sets 4–6, 6–2, 7-6^{(7–5)}. This set up a fourth-round match with Belgian Yanina Wickmayer, who took down Italian Sara Errani with a score of 6–3, 6–4.

- Seeds out:
  - Men's singles: (United States) Andy Roddick [5], (Germany) Tommy Haas [20], (United States) James Blake [21], (United States) Sam Querrey [22], (Germany) Philipp Kohlschreiber [23], (Australia) Lleyton Hewitt [31]
  - Women's singles: (Russia) Dinara Safina [1], (China) Zheng Jie [21], (Romania) Sorana Cîrstea [24], (Russia) Maria Sharapova [29]
  - Men's doubles: (Brazil) Bruno Soares / (Zimbabwe) Kevin Ullyett [8], (Czech Republic) František Čermák / (Slovakia) Michal Mertiňák [10], (Brazil) Marcelo Melo / (Brazil) André Sá [16]
- Schedule of play

Matches on main courts
Matches on Arthur Ashe Stadium
Event	Winner	Loser	Score
Men's singles – 3rd round	(Switzerland) Roger Federer [1]	(Australia) Lleyton Hewitt [31]	4–6, 6–3, 7–5, 6–4
Women's singles – 3rd round	(United States) Melanie Oudin	(Russia) Maria Sharapova [29]	3–6, 6–4, 7–5
Men's singles – 3rd round	(United States) John Isner	(United States) Andy Roddick [5]	7–6^{(7–3)}, 6–3, 3–6, 5–7, 7–6^{(7–5)}
Men's singles – 3rd round	(Spain) Tommy Robredo [14]	(United States) James Blake [21]	7–6^{(7–2)}, 6–4, 6–4
Matches on Louis Armstrong Stadium
Event	Winner	Loser	Score
Men's singles – 3rd round	(Serbia) Novak Djokovic [4]	(United States) Jesse Witten [Q]	6–7^{(2–7)}, 6–3, 7–6^{(7–2)}, 6–4
Men's singles – 3rd round	(Spain) Fernando Verdasco [10]	(Germany) Tommy Haas [20]	3–6, 7–5, 7–6^{(10–8)}, 1–6, 6–4
Women's doubles – 2nd round	(United States) Serena Williams [4] (United States) Venus Williams [4]	(Chinese Taipei) Chan Yung-jan (Slovenia) Katarina Srebotnik	7–5, 6–1
Women's singles – 3rd round	(Czech Republic) Petra Kvitová	(Russia) Dinara Safina [1]	6–4, 2–6, 7–6^{(7–5)}
Matches on the Grandstand
Event	Winner	Loser	Score
Men's singles – 3rd round	(Czech Republic) Radek Štěpánek [15]	(Germany) Philipp Kohlschreiber [23]	4–6, 6–2, 6–3, 6–3
Women's singles – 3rd round	(Russia) Nadia Petrova [13]	(China) Zheng Jie [21]	6–4, 6–1
Men's singles – 3rd round	(Sweden) Robin Söderling [12]	(United States) Sam Querrey [22]	6–2, 7–5, 6–7^{(6–8)}, 6–1
Women's singles – 3rd round	(Russia) Svetlana Kuznetsova [6]	(Israel) Shahar Pe'er	7–5, 6–1
Women's singles – 3rd round	(Denmark) Caroline Wozniacki [9]	(Romania) Sorana Cîrstea [24]	6–3, 6–2
Colored background indicates a night match

=== Day 7 (September 6) ===
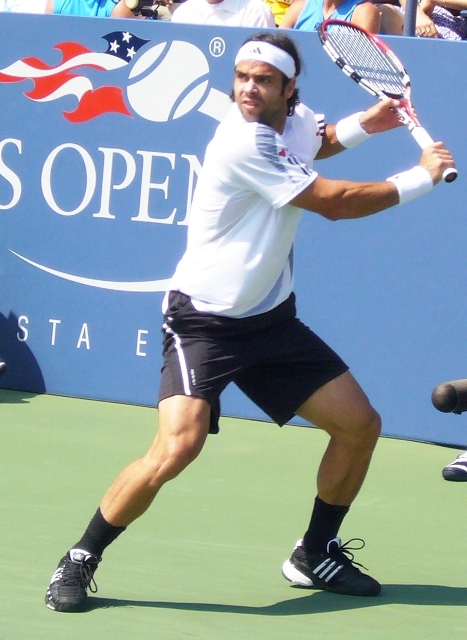
Fernando González returning to Tomáš Berdych

Spaniards Rafael Nadal and Nicolás Almagro played in a third-round match which was won in straight sets by Rafael Nadal, who would face Frenchman Gaël Monfils in the fourth round. Monfils beat Argentine José Acasuso in straight sets. Chilean Fernando González won in straight sets against Czech Tomáš Berdych and would face Frenchman Jo-Wilfried Tsonga, who beat fellow Frenchman Julien Benneteau in straight sets. Spaniard Juan Carlos Ferrero won over higher-seeded Frenchman Gilles Simon. Ferrero advanced to play Argentine Juan Martín del Potro, who won in four sets over Austrian Daniel Köllerer. Croatian Marin Čilić won in three easy sets over Denis Istomin of Uzbekistan to face Briton Andy Murray, who beat American Taylor Dent in three sets.

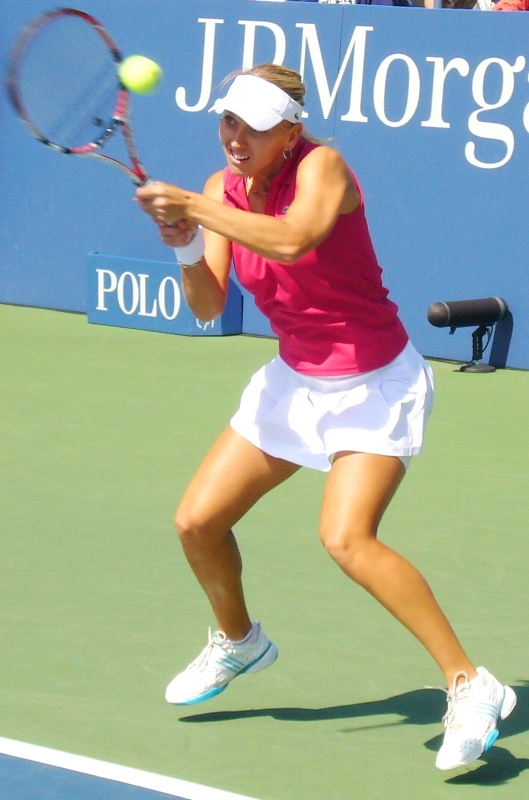
Elena Vesnina in a doubles match with Maria Kirilenko

American Serena Williams beat Slovakian Daniela Hantuchová in two sets that totaled 64 minutes of action to face in the quarterfinals Italian Flavia Pennetta, who beat Russian Vera Zvonareva. Zvonareva had six match points in the second set, but had a meltdown and lost the third set 6–0. Chinese Li Na won in two sets over Italian Francesca Schiavone. Na advanced to play wild-card Belgian Kim Clijsters, who took down third-seeded Venus Williams in three sets after two love games, 6-0 for Clijsters and 0-6 for Venus Williams. The third set went to Clijsters in one break of Venus's serve 6–4.

- Seeds out:
  - Men's singles: (France) Gilles Simon [9], (Czech Republic) Tomáš Berdych [17], (Spain) Nicolás Almagro [32]
  - Women's singles: (United States) Venus Williams [3], (Russia) Vera Zvonareva [7], (Slovakia) Daniela Hantuchová [22], (Italy) Francesca Schiavone [26]
  - Men's doubles: (Czech Republic) Martin Damm / (Sweden) Robert Lindstedt [11]
  - Women's doubles: (Spain) Anabel Medina Garrigues / (Spain) Virginia Ruano Pascual [2], (Germany) Anna-Lena Grönefeld / (Switzerland) Patty Schnyder [9]
- Schedule of play

Matches on main courts
Matches on Arthur Ashe Stadium
Event	Winner	Loser	Score
Women's singles – 4th round	(United States) Serena Williams [2]	(Slovakia) Daniela Hantuchová [22]	6–2, 6–0
Men's singles – 3rd round	(Spain) Rafael Nadal [3]	(Spain) Nicolás Almagro [32]	7–5, 6–4, 6–4
Women's singles – 4th round	(Belgium) Kim Clijsters [WC]	(United States) Venus Williams [3]	6–0, 0–6, 6–4
Women's singles – 4th round	(Italy) Flavia Pennetta [10]	(Russia) Vera Zvonareva [7]	3–6, 7–6^{(8–6)}, 6–0
Men's singles – 3rd round	(United Kingdom) Andy Murray [2]	(United States) Taylor Dent [WC]	6–3, 6–2, 6–2
Matches on Louis Armstrong Stadium
Event	Winner	Loser	Score
Men's singles – 3rd round	(Spain) Juan Carlos Ferrero [24]	(France) Gilles Simon [9]	1–6, 6–4, 7–6^{(7–5)}, 1–0, retired
Women's singles – 4th round	(China) Li Na [18]	(Italy) Francesca Schiavone [26]	6–2, 6–3
Men's singles – 3rd round	(Argentina) Juan Martín del Potro [6]	(Austria) Daniel Köllerer	6–1, 3–6, 6–3, 6–3
Women's doubles – 3rd round	(United States) Serena Williams [4] (United States) Venus Williams [4]	(Romania) Sorana Cîrstea (Denmark) Caroline Wozniacki	6–4, 6–2
Matches on the Grandstand
Event	Winner	Loser	Score
Women's doubles – 3rd round	(Russia) Maria Kirilenko [10] (Russia) Elena Vesnina [10]	(United States) Alexa Glatch (United States) Carly Gullickson	7–6^{(7–3)}, 6–2
Men's singles – 3rd round	(Chile) Fernando González [11]	(Czech Republic) Tomáš Berdych [17]	7–5, 6–4, 6–4
Men's singles – 3rd round	(France) Jo-Wilfried Tsonga [7]	(France) Julien Benneteau	7–6^{(7–4)}, 6–2, 6–4
Men's singles – 3rd round	(France) Gaël Monfils [13]	(Argentina) José Acasuso	6–3, 6–4, 1–0, retired
Colored background indicates a night match

=== Day 8 (September 7) ===
Swede Robin Söderling advanced to the quarterfinals with a retirement of Russian Nikolay Davydenko to face the Swiss Roger Federer, who beat Spaniard Tommy Robredo in straight sets. This would mark the third time the duo of Federer and Söderling has met in a Grand Slam in 2009, including the 2009 French Open final and the 2009 Wimbledon Championships fourth round, which were both won by Federer. Spaniard Fernando Verdasco beat American John Isner to advance into the quarterfinals, which means for the first time in US Open history no American male advanced into the quarterfinals of the tournament. Verdasco would face Serbian Novak Djokovic in the quarterfinals because Djokovic took down Czech Radek Štěpánek in straight sets. After defeating Štěpánek, Djokovic provided a light-hearted moment for the crowd along with former tennis great and current commentator John McEnroe. Djokovic began by impersonating McEnroe, who grew up in the nearby Queens neighborhood of Douglaston. He then motioned for McEnroe to come down from the press box; McEnroe obliged, mimicking some of Djokovic's mannerisms before the two played a few points. The two then embraced at the net.

The first match featured Ukrainian Kateryna Bondarenko making quick work of Argentine Gisela Dulko in double-bagel sets in 47 minutes. Dulko had beaten Bondarenko's sister, Alona Bondarenko, in the second round. with Dulko making 20 unforced errors compared to Bondarenko's 6, while Bondarenko made 17 winners to Dulko's 7. Melanie Oudin advanced to her first Grand Slam quarterfinal with a 1–6, 7–6, 6–3 win over No. 13 seed Nadia Petrova. Belgian Yanina Wickmayer won in a three-set match against Czech Petra Kvitová to advance into the quarterfinals, making two Belgians who have advanced to the quarterfinals for the first time since the 2003 US Open tournament. Wickmayer took advantage of the Czech's unforced errors and won the match 4–6, 6–4, 7–5. Caroline Wozniacki defeated Svetlana Kuznetsova 2–6, 7–6, 7–6 in an absorbing contest that kicked off Monday's night session on Arthur Ashe Stadium.

- Seeds out:
  - Men's singles: (Russia) Nikolay Davydenko [8], (Spain) Tommy Robredo [14], (Czech Republic) Radek Štěpánek [15]
  - Women's singles: (Russia) Svetlana Kuznetsova [6], (Russia) Nadia Petrova [13]
  - Women's singles: (Slovakia) Daniela Hantuchová / (Japan) Ai Sugiyama [5], (United States) Vania King / (Romania) Monica Niculescu [12]
  - Mixed doubles: (United States) Lisa Raymond / (Poland) Marcin Matkowski [3], (Australia) Rennae Stubbs / (Sweden) Robert Lindstedt [7], (United States) Bethanie Mattek-Sands / (Serbia) Nenad Zimonjić [8]
- Schedule of play

Matches on main courts
Matches on Arthur Ashe Stadium
Event	Winner	Loser	Score
Women's singles – 4th round	(Ukraine) Kateryna Bondarenko	(Argentina) Gisela Dulko	6–0, 6–0
Women's singles – 4th round	(United States) Melanie Oudin	(Russia) Nadia Petrova [13]	1–6, 7–6^{(7–2)}, 6–3
Men's singles – 4th round	(Switzerland) Roger Federer [1]	(Spain) Tommy Robredo [14]	7–5, 6–2, 6–2
Women's singles – 4th round	(Denmark) Caroline Wozniacki [9]	(Russia) Svetlana Kuznetsova [6]	2–6, 7–6^{(7–5)}, 7–6^{(7–3)}
Men's singles – 4th round	(Serbia) Novak Djokovic [4]	(Czech Republic) Radek Štěpánek [15]	6–1, 6–3, 6–3
Matches on Louis Armstrong Stadium
Event	Winner	Loser	Score
Men's singles – 4th round	(Sweden) Robin Söderling [12]	(Russia) Nikolay Davydenko [8]	7–5, 3–6, 6–2, retired
Women's singles – 4th round	(Belgium) Yanina Wickmayer	(Czech Republic) Petra Kvitová	4–6, 6–4, 7–5
Men's singles – 4th round	(Spain) Fernando Verdasco [10]	(United States) John Isner	4–6, 6–4, 6–4, 6–4
Mixed doubles – Quarterfinals	(United States) Liezel Huber [1] (India) Mahesh Bhupathi [1]	(United States) Bethanie Mattek-Sands [8] (Serbia) Nenad Zimonjić [8]	6–4, 6–3
Matches on the Grandstand
Event	Winner	Loser	Score
Men's doubles – 3rd round	(Czech Republic) Lukáš Dlouhý [4] (India) Leander Paes [4]	(Austria) Julian Knowle (Austria) Jürgen Melzer	7–5, 6–4
Men's doubles – 3rd round	(Canada) Daniel Nestor [2] (Serbia) Nenad Zimonjić [2]	(United States) Robert Kendrick (Serbia) Janko Tipsarević	6–2, 5–7, 6–4
Women's doubles – 3rd round	(China) Yan Zi [11] (China) Zheng Jie [11]	(Slovakia) Daniela Hantuchová [5] (Japan) Ai Sugiyama [5]	4–6, 6–4, 6–4
Mixed doubles – Quarterfinals	(Zimbabwe) Cara Black [2] (India) Leander Paes [2]	(Australia) Rennae Stubbs [7] (Sweden) Robert Lindstedt [7]	7–5, 3–6, [10–6]
Colored background indicates a night match

=== Day 9 (September 8) ===
In the fourth round of men's singles, Juan Martín del Potro won in straight sets over 2003 finalist Juan Carlos Ferrero 6–3, 6–3, 6–3. This set up a quarterfinal clash with Marin Čilić, who upset second-seeded Andy Murray in straight sets as well. In a closely contested match Fernando González prevailed over Frenchman Jo-Wilfried Tsonga in four sets. The 11th-seeded Gonzalez advanced to his second US Open quarterfinal, having reached this stage seven years ago. This set up a meeting with Rafael Nadal in the quarterfinals who outlasted the last Frenchman Gaël Monfils in four sets.

Belgian wild-card Kim Clijsters won over Chinese Li Na in two sets 6–2, 6–4 to make it to the semifinals. The next match featured American Serena Williams who defeated a gritty competitor in Italian Flavia Pennetta in the quarterfinals in two hard-fought sets. This set up a meeting in the semifinals with Clijsters, who defeated Serena's sister Venus in the fourth round.

- Seeds out:
  - Men's singles: (United Kingdom) Andy Murray [2], (France) Jo-Wilfried Tsonga [7], (France) Gaël Monfils [13], (Spain) Juan Carlos Ferrero [24]
  - Women's singles: (Italy) Flavia Pennetta [10], (China) Li Na [18]
  - Men's doubles: (Canada) Daniel Nestor / (Serbia) Nenad Zimonjić [2], (South Africa) Wesley Moodie / (Belgium) Dick Norman [7]
  - Women's doubles: (United States) Bethanie Mattek-Sands / (Russia) Nadia Petrova [8], (Russia) Maria Kirilenko / (Russia) Elena Vesnina [10]
  - Mixed doubles: (United States) Liezel Huber / (India) Mahesh Bhupathi [1], (Chinese Taipei) Hsieh Su-wei / (Zimbabwe) Kevin Ullyett [5]
- Schedule of play

Matches on main courts
Matches on Arthur Ashe Stadium
Event	Winner	Loser	Score
Men's doubles – Quarterfinals	(United States) Bob Bryan [1] (United States) Mike Bryan [1]	(Australia) Carsten Ball [Alt] (Australia) Chris Guccione [Alt]	6–4, 7–6^{(7–2)}
Women's singles – Quarterfinals	(Belgium) Kim Clijsters [WC]	(China) Li Na [18]	6–2, 6–4
Men's singles – 4th round	(Croatia) Marin Čilić [16]	(United Kingdom) Andy Murray [2]	7–5, 6–2, 6–2
Women's singles – Quarterfinals	(United States) Serena Williams [2]	(Italy) Flavia Pennetta [10]	6–4, 6–3
Men's singles – 4th round	(Spain) Rafael Nadal [3]	(France) Gaël Monfils [13]	6–7^{(3–7)}, 6–3, 6–1, 6–3
Matches on Louis Armstrong Stadium
Event	Winner	Loser	Score
Men's doubles – Quarterfinals	(Czech Republic) Lukáš Dlouhý [4] (India) Leander Paes [4]	(South Africa) Wesley Moodie[7] (Belgium) Dick Norman [7]	6–3, 5–7, 6–4
Men's singles – 4th round	(Argentina) Juan Martín del Potro [6]	(Spain) Juan Carlos Ferrero [24]	6–3, 6–3, 6–3
Women's doubles – Quarterfinals	(Australia) Samantha Stosur [3] (Australia) Rennae Stubbs [3]	(United States) Bethanie Mattek-Sands [8] (Russia) Nadia Petrova [8]	6–2, 6–3
Men's singles – 4th round	(Chile) Fernando González [11]	(France) Jo-Wilfried Tsonga [7]	3–6, 6–3, 7–6^{(7–3)}, 6–4
Matches on the Grandstand
Event	Winner	Loser	Score
Women's doubles – Quarterfinals	(Russia) Alisa Kleybanova [13] (Russia) Ekaterina Makarova [13]	(Russia) Maria Kirilenko [10] (Russia) Elena Vesnina [10]	6–3, 2–6, 6–4
Men's doubles – Quarterfinals	(India) Mahesh Bhupathi [3] (The Bahamas) Mark Knowles [3]	(Croatia) Ivan Ljubičić (France) Michaël Llodra	6–4, 4–6, 7–6^{(7–4)}
Mixed doubles – Semifinals	(Zimbabwe) Cara Black [2] (India) Leander Paes [2]	(Chinese Taipei) Hsieh Su-wei [5] (Zimbabwe) Kevin Ullyett [5]	6–2, 3–6, [10–5]
Men's doubles – Semifinals	(Belarus) Max Mirnyi [5] (Israel) Andy Ram [5]	(Canada) Daniel Nestor [2] (Serbia) Nenad Zimonjić [2]	6–7^{(4–7)}, 6–4, 6–0
Colored background indicates a night match

=== Day 10 (September 9) ===
The first quarterfinals match in the Men's side featured no. 4 seed Novak Djokovic taking on no. 10 seed Fernando Verdasco, with Novak Djokovic prevailing over Fernando Verdasco 7–6, 1–6, 7–5, 6–2 to reach his third straight semi-finals in the US Open. The next match saw Robin Söderling against Roger Federer. Federer defeated Söderling in four sets: 6–0, 6–3, 6–7, 7–6.

The third quarterfinals match and the first of the day for the Women's side featured Belgian Yanina Wickmayer beating Kateryna Bondarenko of Ukraine in two sets, joining Belgian Kim Clijsters in the semi-finals. This set up a semifinal match with Caroline Wozniacki from Denmark, who defeated American Melanie Oudin in two sets 6–2, 6–2.

- Seeds out:
  - Men's singles: (Spain) Fernando Verdasco [10], (Sweden) Robin Söderling [12]
  - Men's doubles: (United States) Bob Bryan / (United States) Mike Bryan [1], (Belarus) Max Mirnyi / (Israel) Andy Ram [5]
  - Women's doubles: (Spain) Nuria Llagostera Vives / (Spain) María José Martínez Sánchez [6], (China) Yan Zi / (China) Zheng Jie [11]
- Schedule of play

Matches on main courts
Matches on Arthur Ashe Stadium
Event	Winner	Loser	Score
Men's doubles – Semifinals	(Czech Republic) Lukáš Dlouhý [4] (India) Leander Paes [4]	(United States) Bob Bryan [1] (United States) Mike Bryan [1]	6–4, 3–6, 7–6^{(8–6)}
Women's singles – Quarterfinals	(Belgium) Yanina Wickmayer	(Ukraine) Kateryna Bondarenko	7–5, 6–4
Men's singles – Quarterfinals	(Serbia) Novak Djokovic [4]	(Spain) Fernando Verdasco [10]	7–6^{(7–2)}, 1–6, 7–5, 6–2
Women's singles – Quarterfinals	(Denmark) Caroline Wozniacki [9]	(United States) Melanie Oudin	6–2, 6–2
Men's singles – Quarterfinals	(Switzerland) Roger Federer [1]	(Sweden) Robin Söderling [12]	6–0, 6–3, 6–7^{(6–8)}, 7–6^{(8–6)}
Matches on Louis Armstrong Stadium
Event	Winner	Loser	Score
Junior boys' singles 2nd round	(Australia) Bernard Tomic [3]	(United States) Alexander Domijan	4–6, 7–5, 6–1
Women's doubles – Quarterfinals	(Zimbabwe) Cara Black [1] (United States) Liezel Huber [1]	(Spain) Nuria Llagostera Vives [6] (Spain) María José Martínez Sánchez [6]	6–3, 2–6, 7–5
Women's doubles – Quarterfinals	(United States) Serena Williams [4] (United States) Venus Williams [4]	(China) Yan Zi [11] (China) Zheng Jie [11]	7–5, 6–4
Men's doubles – Semifinals	(India) Mahesh Bhupathi [3] (The Bahamas) Mark Knowles [3]	(Belarus) Max Mirnyi [5] (Israel) Andy Ram [5]	6–4, 6–2
Colored background indicates a night match

=== Day 11 (September 10) ===
Argentinie Juan Martín del Potro defeated Croatian Marin Čilić in four sets and became the third of his country to qualify for the semifinals (after Vilas and Nalbandian). The other quarterfinal match between Rafael Nadal and Fernando González was suspended due to bad weather and would be resumed on Friday. Rafael Nadal was leading 7-6(4), 6-6(3–2) when play was stopped.

The Williams sisters defeated Russians Alisa Kleybanova and Ekaterina Makarova in three sets and qualified for the final. The mixed doubles final saw Americans Carly Gullickson and Travis Parrott claim the title in straight sets over Zimbabwe's Cara Black and Indian Leander Paes.

Seeded players out

- Men's Singles: (Croatia) Marin Čilić
- Women's Doubles: (Russia) Alisa Kleybanova / (Russia) Ekaterina Makarova
- Mixed Doubles: (Zimbabwe) Cara Black / (India) Leander Paes

Schedule of play

Matches on main courts
Matches on Arthur Ashe Stadium
Event	Winner	Loser	Score
Women's doubles – Semifinals	(United States) Serena Williams [4] (United States) Venus Williams [4]	(Russia) Alisa Kleybanova [13] (Russia) Ekaterina Makarova [13]	7–6(4), 3–6, 6–2
Mixed doubles – Finals	(United States) Carly Gullickson (United States) Travis Parrott	(Zimbabwe) Cara Black [2] (India) Leander Paes [2]	6–2, 6–4
Men's singles – Quarterfinals	(Argentina) Juan Martín del Potro [6]	(Croatia) Marin Čilić [16]	4–6, 6–3, 6–2, 6–1
Matches on Louis Armstrong Stadium
Event	Winner	Loser	Score
Junior boys' singles 3rd round	(India) Yuki Bhambri [1]	(United States) Jack Sock	6–4, 6–4
Wheelchair women's singles quarterfinals	(Netherlands) Esther Vergeer [1]	(France) Florence Gravellier	6–2, 7–5
Junior girls' singles 3rd round	(United States) Beatrice Capra [16]	(United States) Asia Muhammad	3–6, 6–1, 6–1
Wheelchair men's singles quarterfinals	(Japan) Shingo Kunieda [1]	(Austria) Martin Legner	6–2, 6–0
Colored background indicates a night match

=== Day 12 (September 11) ===
All the matches that should have been played this day were postponed due to the continued rain.

Schedule of play

=== Day 13 (September 12) ===
Rafael Nadal needed 34 minutes to finish off Fernando González in their rain-interrupted quarterfinal, advancing 7–6, 7–6, 6–0 at the Arthur Ashe Stadium. Nadal led 7-6 and 3–2 in a second-set tiebreak when play was called off late Thursday evening. Precipitation throughout a gloomy Friday rendered play impossible, throwing the schedule into chaos and prompting a resumption on Saturday at noon.

Kim Clijsters won an entry into the women's singles final after a dramatic ending to her semifinal against Serena Williams. After losing the first set 4–6, Williams smashed her racquet into the ground, giving her a code violation warning for racquet abuse from the chair umpire. In the second set, down 5–6 (15–30), Williams had a foot fault called on her second serve, giving Clijsters two match points at 15–40. Williams started yelling at the line umpire, who reported to the chair umpire. As a result, she was penalized for another code violation, for unsportsmanlike conduct, meaning a point penalty for Williams, which meant that Clijsters was awarded the match 6–4 7–5 without playing the match point. Williams later admitted that she was "pretty sure" she did foot fault. After securing her thirteenth straight win at the US Open, Clijsters went on to play Danish youngster Caroline Wozniacki in the final, who beat her unseeded opponent Yanina Wickmayer 6–3 6–3.

Seeded players out

- Men's Singles: (Chile) Fernando González
- Women's Singles: (United States) Serena Williams

Schedule of play

Matches on main courts
Matches on Arthur Ashe Stadium
Event	Winner	Loser	Score
Men's singles – Quarterfinals	(Spain) Rafael Nadal [3]	(Chile) Fernando González [11]	7–6(4), 7–6(2), 6–0
Women's singles – Semifinals	(Belgium) Kim Clijsters [WC]	(United States) Serena Williams [2]	6–4, 7–5
Matches on Louis Armstrong Stadium
Event	Winner	Loser	Score
Women's singles – Semifinals	(Denmark) Caroline Wozniacki [9]	(Belgium) Yanina Wickmayer	6–3, 6–3
Colored background indicates a night match

=== Day 14 (September 13) ===
In the first match, Juan Martín del Potro defeated third-ranked Rafael Nadal easily, winning 6–2, 6–2, 6-2 and became the first finalist of the men's singles tournament. Del Potro's convincing victory, which echoed Caroline Wozniacki's takedown of crowd favorite Melanie Oudin in the quarterfinals, set the twenty-year-old Argentine up for his first Grand Slam final.

In the second semifinal of the women's doubles championship Cara Black and Liezel Huber defeated Samantha Stosur and Rennae Stubbs in three sets and they became finalist of the championship to defend which they got in 2008.

Lukáš Dlouhý and Leander Paes won the men's doubles defeating Mahesh Bhupathi and Mark Knowles also in three sets.

Del Potro's opponent in the men's championship match was decided in a contest between world number one Roger Federer and fourth-ranked Novak Djokovic, who lost to Federer in the final of the 2007 U.S. Open. Federer dispatched his opponent in straight sets, winning 7-6(3), 7–5, 7–5, to round out the final two players remaining from an original draw of 128 men's professional tennis players.

In the women's final, unranked Kim Clijsters capped off an impressive return to professional tennis with a win over ninth seed Caroline Wozniacki of Denmark, winning 7–5, 6–3, for her second Grand Slam title.

Seeded players out

- Men's Singles: (Spain) Rafael Nadal, (Serbia) Novak Djokovic
- Women's Singles: (Denmark) Caroline Wozniacki
- Men's Doubles: (India) Mahesh Bhupathi / (The Bahamas) Mark Knowles
- Women's Doubles: (Australia) Samantha Stosur / (Australia) Rennae Stubbs

Schedule of play

Matches on main courts
Matches on Arthur Ashe Stadium
Event	Winner	Loser	Score
Men's singles – Semifinals	(Argentina) Juan Martín del Potro [6]	(Spain) Rafael Nadal [3]	6–2, 6–2, 6–2
Men's singles – Semifinals	(Switzerland) Roger Federer [1]	(Serbia) Novak Djokovic [4]	7–6(3), 7–5, 7–5
Women's singles – Final	(Belgium) Kim Clijsters [WC]	(Denmark) Caroline Wozniacki [9]	7–5, 6–3
Matches on Louis Armstrong Stadium
Event	Winner	Loser	Score
Women's doubles – Semifinals	(Zimbabwe) Cara Black [1] (United States) Liezel Huber [1]	(Australia) Samantha Stosur [3] (Australia) Rennae Stubbs [3]	5–7, 6–3, 6–1
Men's doubles – Final	(Czech Republic) Lukáš Dlouhý [4] (India) Leander Paes [4]	(India) Mahesh Bhupathi [3] (The Bahamas) Mark Knowles [3]	3–6, 6–3, 6–2
Colored background indicates a night match

=== Day 15 (September 14) ===
The Williams sisters beat Cara Black and Liezel Huber in straight sets to win the women's doubles championship, 6-2 6–2.

Juan Martín del Potro defeated Roger Federer in five sets. In so doing he became the third Argentine to win the US Open title, and the first South American to win a men's Grand Slam event on a hard court.

There was some controversy during the presentation ceremony when the Master of Ceremonies initially refused to allow del Potro the time to speak in Spanish as he was under pressure from his American television network, CBS, to get the ceremony over with so that it could return to its regularly scheduled programming.

Seeded players out

- Men's Singles: (Switzerland) Roger Federer
- Women's Doubles: (Zimbabwe) Cara Black / (United States) Liezel Huber

Schedule of play

Matches on main courts
Matches on Arthur Ashe Stadium
Event	Winner	Loser	Score
Women's doubles – Final	(United States) Serena Williams [4] (United States) Venus Williams [4]	(Zimbabwe) Cara Black [1] (United States) Liezel Huber [1]	6–2, 6–2
Men's singles – Final	(Argentina) Juan Martín del Potro [6]	(Switzerland) Roger Federer [1]	3–6, 7–6(5), 4–6, 7–6(4), 6–2

== Seniors ==
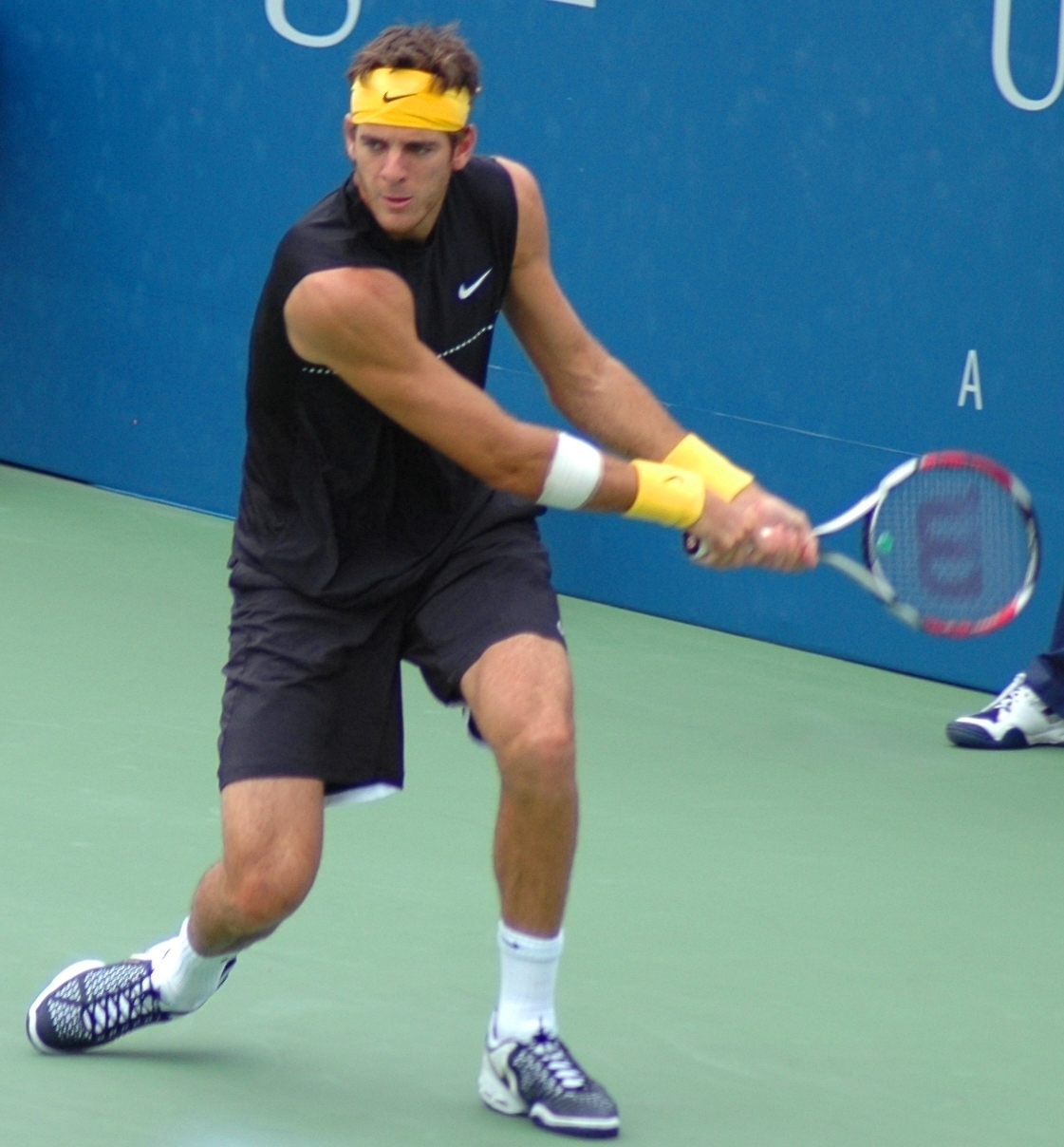
Juan Martín del Potro won his first slam title of his career at the 2009 US Open.

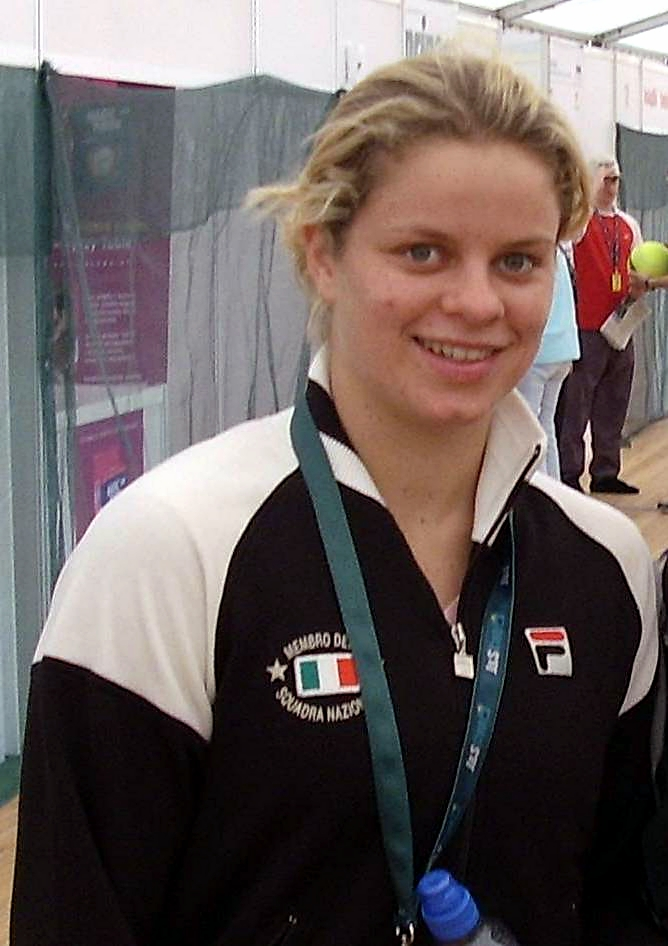
Kim Clijsters won her second US Open title, which goes with her 2005 triumph, and won as a wildcard in the 2009 US Open.

=== Men's singles ===
(Argentina) Juan Martín del Potro defeated (Switzerland) Roger Federer, 3–6, 7–6^{(7–5)}, 4–6, 7–6^{(7–4)}, 6–2

- Del Potro won his 3rd title of the year, 7th overall, and 1st and only Grand Slam title.
- Del Potro became the fourth Argentine player, after Guillermo Vilas, Gabriela Sabatini and Gastón Gaudio, to win the Grand Slam final.

=== Women's singles ===
(Belgium) Kim Clijsters defeated (Denmark) Caroline Wozniacki, 7–5, 6–3

- Clijsters won for the first time this year and 35th overall. It was her 2nd career Grand Slam, having previously won the 2005 US Open.
- Wozniacki became the first Danish female tennis player to reach the Grand Slam final, and first in the Open Era.

=== Men's doubles ===
(Czech Republic) Lukáš Dlouhý / (India) Leander Paes defeated (India) Mahesh Bhupathi / (The Bahamas) Mark Knowles, 3–6, 6–3, 6–2

- This was the pair of Dlouhý and Paes first US Open Men's Doubles title together, which this is the second slam doubles title they won this year along with the French title.

=== Women's doubles ===
(United States) Serena Williams / (United States) Venus Williams defeated (Zimbabwe) Cara Black / (United States) Liezel Huber, 6–2, 6–2

- This was the Williams' Sisters second US Open Women's Doubles title, and was the third doubles slam title they won this year along with the Australian Open and Wimbledon.

=== Mixed doubles ===
(United States) Carly Gullickson / (United States) Travis Parrott defeated (Zimbabwe) Cara Black / (India) Leander Paes, 6–2, 6–4.

- This was the first ever slam title for the pair of Gullickson and Parrott.

== Juniors ==
=== Boys' singles ===
(Australia) Bernard Tomic defeated (United States) Chase Buchanan, 6–1, 6–3.

=== Girls' singles ===
(United Kingdom) Heather Watson defeated (Russia) Yana Buchina, 6–4, 6–1.

=== Boys' doubles ===
(Hungary) Márton Fucsovics / (Chinese Taipei) Hsieh Cheng-peng defeated (France) Julien Obry / (France) Adrien Puget, 7–6(5), 5–7, [10–1]

=== Girls' doubles ===
(Russia) Valeria Solovieva / (Ukraine) Maryna Zanevska defeated (Romania) Elena Bogdan / (Thailand) Noppawan Lertcheewakarn, 1–6, 6–3, [10–7]

== Wheelchair ==
=== Wheelchair men's singles ===
(Japan) Shingo Kunieda defeated (Netherlands) Maikel Scheffers, 6–0, 6–0

=== Wheelchair women's singles ===
(Netherlands) Esther Vergeer defeated (Netherlands) Korie Homan, 6–0, 6–0

=== Wheelchair men's doubles ===
(France) Stéphane Houdet / (Sweden) Stefan Olsson defeated (Netherlands) Maikel Scheffers / (Netherlands) Ronald Vink, 6–4, 4–6, 6–4

=== Wheelchair women's doubles ===
(Netherlands) Korie Homan / (Netherlands) Esther Vergeer defeated (Australia) Daniela DiToro / (France) Florence Gravellier, 6–2, 6–2

=== Wheelchair quad singles ===
(United Kingdom) Peter Norfolk defeated (United States) David Wagner, 6–3, 3–6, 6–3

=== Wheelchair quad doubles ===
(United States) Nick Taylor / (United States) David Wagner defeated (Sweden) Johan Andersson / (United Kingdom) Peter Norfolk, 6–1, 6–7(5), 6–3

== Seeds ==
Withdrawals: David Nalbandian, Dominika Cibulková, Mardy Fish

=== Men's singles ===
1. (Switzerland) Roger Federer (final, lost to Juan Martín del Potro)
2. (United Kingdom) Andy Murray (fourth round, lost to Marin Čilić)
3. (Spain) Rafael Nadal (semifinals, lost to Juan Martín del Potro)
4. (Serbia) Novak Djokovic (semifinals, lost to Roger Federer)
5. (United States) Andy Roddick (third round, lost to John Isner)
6. (Argentina) Juan Martín del Potro (champion)
7. (France) Jo-Wilfried Tsonga (fourth round, lost to Fernando González)
8. (Russia) Nikolay Davydenko (fourth round, retired – hip injury – against Robin Söderling)
9. (France) Gilles Simon (third round, retired – knee injury – against Juan Carlos Ferrero)
10. (Spain) Fernando Verdasco (quarterfinals, lost to Novak Djokovic)
11. (Chile) Fernando González (quarterfinals, lost to Rafael Nadal)
12. (Sweden) Robin Söderling (quarterfinals, lost to Roger Federer)
13. (France) Gaël Monfils (fourth round, lost to Rafael Nadal)
14. (Spain) Tommy Robredo (fourth round, lost to Roger Federer)
15. (Czech Republic) Radek Štěpánek (fourth round, lost to Novak Djokovic)
16. (Croatia) Marin Čilić (quarterfinals, lost to Juan Martín del Potro)
17. (Czech Republic) Tomáš Berdych (third round, lost to Fernando González)
18. (Spain) David Ferrer (second round, lost to José Acasuso)
19. (Switzerland) Stanislas Wawrinka (first round, lost to Nicolás Lapentti)
20. (Germany) Tommy Haas (third round, lost to Fernando Verdasco)
21. (United States) James Blake (third round, lost to Tommy Robredo)
22. (United States) Sam Querrey (third round, lost to Robin Söderling)
23. (Germany) Philipp Kohlschreiber (third round, lost to Radek Štěpánek)
24. (Spain) Juan Carlos Ferrero (fourth round, lost to Juan Martín del Potro)
25. (United States) Mardy Fish (withdrew due to rib injury)
26. (France) Paul-Henri Mathieu (first round, lost to Mikhail Youzhny)
27. (Croatia) Ivo Karlović (first round, lost to Iván Navarro)
28. (Romania) Victor Hănescu (first round, lost to John Isner)
29. (Russia) Igor Andreev (first round, lost to Jesse Witten)
30. (Serbia) Viktor Troicki (second round, lost to Julien Benneteau)
31. (Australia) Lleyton Hewitt (third round, lost to Roger Federer)
32. (Spain) Nicolás Almagro (third round, lost to Rafael Nadal)

=== Women's singles ===
1. (Russia) Dinara Safina (third round, lost to Petra Kvitová)
2. (United States) Serena Williams (semifinals, lost to Kim Clijsters)
3. (United States) Venus Williams (fourth round, lost to Kim Clijsters)
4. (Russia) Elena Dementieva (second round, lost to Melanie Oudin)
5. (Serbia) Jelena Janković (second round, lost to Yaroslava Shvedova)
6. (Russia) Svetlana Kuznetsova (fourth round, lost to Caroline Wozniacki)
7. (Russia) Vera Zvonareva (fourth round, lost to Flavia Pennetta)
8. (Belarus) Victoria Azarenka (third round, lost to Francesca Schiavone)
9. (Denmark) Caroline Wozniacki (final, lost to Kim Clijsters)
10. (Italy) Flavia Pennetta (quarterfinals, lost to Serena Williams)
11. (Serbia) Ana Ivanovic (first round, lost to Kateryna Bondarenko)
12. (Poland) Agnieszka Radwańska (second round, lost to Maria Kirilenko)
13. (Russia) Nadia Petrova (fourth round, lost to Melanie Oudin)
14. (France) Marion Bartoli (second round, lost to Kim Clijsters)
15. (Australia) Samantha Stosur (second round, lost to Vania King)
16. (France) Virginie Razzano (first round, lost to Yanina Wickmayer)
17. (France) Amélie Mauresmo (second round, lost to Aleksandra Wozniak)
18. (China) Li Na (quarterfinals, lost to Kim Clijsters)
19. (Switzerland) Patty Schnyder (second round, lost to Sara Errani)
20. (Spain) Anabel Medina Garrigues (second round, lost to Kirsten Flipkens)
21. (China) Zheng Jie (third round, lost to Nadia Petrova)
22. (Slovakia) Daniela Hantuchová (fourth round, lost to Serena Williams)
23. (Germany) Sabine Lisicki (second round, lost to Anastasia Rodionova)
24. (Romania) Sorana Cîrstea (third round, lost to Caroline Wozniacki)
25. (Estonia) Kaia Kanepi (first round, lost to Chang Kai-Chen)
26. (Italy) Francesca Schiavone (fourth round, lost to Li Na)
27. (Russia) Alisa Kleybanova (first round, lost to Petra Kvitová)
28. (Austria) Sybille Bammer (first round, lost to María José Martínez Sánchez)
29. (Russia) Maria Sharapova (third round, lost to Melanie Oudin)
30. (Ukraine) Alona Bondarenko (second round, lost to Gisela Dulko)
31. (Russia) Elena Vesnina (third round, lost to Vera Zvonareva)
32. (Hungary) Ágnes Szávay (first round, lost to Shahar Pe'er)

== Wildcard entries ==
Below are the lists of the wildcard awardees entering in the main draw.

=== Men's singles wildcard entries ===
1. (United States) Devin Britton
2. (United States) Chase Buchanan
3. (United States) Taylor Dent
4. (United States) Brendan Evans
5. (Australia) Chris Guccione
6. (United States) Jesse Levine
7. (France) Michaël Llodra
8. (United States) Ryan Sweeting

=== Women's singles wildcard entries ===
1. (United States) Gail Brodsky
2. (United States) Mallory Cecil
3. (Belgium) Kim Clijsters (champion)
4. (United States) Alexa Glatch
5. (United States) Vania King
6. (United States) Christina McHale
7. (France) Kristina Mladenovic
8. (Australia) Olivia Rogowska

=== Men's doubles wildcard entries ===
1. (United States) Brendan Evans / (United States) Alex Kuznetsov
2. (United States) Robby Ginepri / (United States) Scoville Jenkins
3. (United States) Ryan Harrison / (United States) Kaes Van't Hof
4. (United States) Jesse Levine / (United States) Ryan Sweeting
5. (United States) David Martin / (United States) Donald Young
6. (United States) Daniel Nguyen / (United States) JT Sundling
7. (United States) Wayne Odesnik / (United States) Michael Shabaz

=== Women's doubles wildcard entries ===
1. (United States) Kristie Ahn / (United States) Courtney Dolehide
2. (United States) Lauren Albanese / (United States) Angela Haynes
3. (United States) Alexa Glatch / (United States) Carly Gullickson
4. (United States) Christina McHale / (United States) Asia Muhammad
5. (Australia) Alicia Molik / (United States) Meghann Shaughnessy
6. (United States) Ahsha Rolle / (United States) Riza Zalameda
7. (United States) Sloane Stephens / (United States) Mashona Washington

=== Mixed doubles wildcard entries ===
1. (United States) Mallory Cecil / (United States) Devin Britton
2. (United States) Jill Craybas / (United States) Eric Butorac
3. (United States) Carly Gullickson / (United States) Travis Parrott (champions)
4. (United States) Angela Haynes / (United States) Travis Rettenmaier
5. (United States) Melanie Oudin / (United States) Rajeev Ram
6. (United States) Shenay Perry / (United States) Scoville Jenkins
7. (United States) Abigail Spears / (United States) Robert Kendrick

== Qualifiers ==
Below are the lists of the qualifiers entering the main draw.

=== Men's singles ===
1. (Brazil) Thomaz Bellucci
2. (Argentina) Horacio Zeballos
3. (United States) Michael Yani
4. (Turkey) Marsel İlhan
5. (France) Josselin Ouanna
6. (United States) Jesse Witten
7. (Germany) Dieter Kindlmann
8. (Colombia) Alejandro Falla
9. (Canada) Peter Polansky
10. (Germany) Michael Berrer
11. (Argentina) Juan Pablo Brzezicki
12. (Australia) Carsten Ball
13. (Switzerland) Marco Chiudinelli
14. (Ecuador) Giovanni Lapentti
15. (United States) Donald Young
16. (India) Somdev Devvarman

Lucky losers

1. (Australia) Peter Luczak
2. (Portugal) Rui Machado

=== Women's singles ===
1. (Chinese Taipei) Chang Kai-chen
2. (Australia) Anastasia Rodionova
3. (Japan) Yurika Sema
4. (Poland) Marta Domachowska
5. (Germany) Angelique Kerber
6. (Australia) Monique Adamczak
7. (Czech Republic) Eva Hrdinová
8. (Croatia) Petra Martić
9. (United States) Shenay Perry
10. (Russia) Vesna Manasieva
11. (United States) Carly Gullickson
12. (Czech Republic) Barbora Záhlavová-Strýcová
13. (Ukraine) Mariya Koryttseva
14. (Canada) Valérie Tétreault
15. (France) Camille Pin
16. (Austria) Yvonne Meusburger

== Protected ranking ==
The following players were accepted directly into the main draw using a protected ranking:

Men's Singles

- (Argentina) Juan Ignacio Chela
- (Romania) Andrei Pavel

Women's Singles

- (United States) Laura Granville
- (United States) Meghann Shaughnessy

== Withdrawals ==
Men's Singles

- (Croatia) Mario Ančić → replaced by (Slovakia) Karol Beck
- (United States) Mardy Fish → replaced by (Portugal) Rui Machado
- (Czech Republic) Ivo Minář → replaced by (United States) Rajeev Ram
- (Spain) Carlos Moyá → replaced by (Ecuador) Nicolás Lapentti
- (Luxembourg) Gilles Müller → replaced by (Uruguay) Pablo Cuevas
- (Argentina) David Nalbandian → replaced by (Spain) Iván Navarro
- (Belgium) Kristof Vliegen → replaced by (Australia) Peter Luczak

Women's Singles

- (Slovakia) Dominika Cibulková → replaced by (Italy) Alberta Brianti
- (France) Nathalie Dechy → replaced by (Netherlands) Arantxa Rus
- (United Kingdom) Anne Keothavong → replaced by (France) Séverine Brémond Beltrame
- (Austria) Tamira Paszek → replaced by (Canada) Stéphanie Dubois

== Prize money ==
Category	Amount
Total prize money	$21,664,000
Men's singles winner	$1,600,000
Men's singles runner-up	$800,000
Women's singles winner	$1,600,000
Women's singles runner-up	$800,000
Men's doubles winners	$420,000
Men's doubles runners-up	$210,000
Women's doubles winners	$420,000
Women's doubles runners-up	$210,000
Mixed doubles winners	$150,000
Mixed doubles runners-up	$70,000

== Media coverage ==
Country	Broadcasters
United States	CBS; ESPN2; Tennis Channel
Canada	TSN; RDS; TSN2
Brazil	ESPN Brasil; SporTV
United Kingdom	Sky Sports 2 Sky Sports Xtra; Eurosport
Switzerland	SF zwei Eurosport
France	Canal + Eurosport
Germany	Eurosport; Eurosport 2
Denmark	Eurosport; Eurosport 2
Finland	Eurosport; Eurosport 2
Bulgaria	Eurosport; Eurosport 2
Romania	Eurosport; Eurosport 2
Hungary	Eurosport; Eurosport 2
Serbia	Eurosport; Eurosport 2
Italy	Eurosport; Eurosport 2
Portugal	RTP; RTP 2 Eurosport; Eurosport 2
Belgium	VRT
Spain	Digital plus Antena 3
India	Ten Sports
Pakistan	Ten Sports
Japan	WOWOW
China	CCTV-5
Thailand	TrueVisions
Philippines	Balls

Preceded by 2009 Wimbledon Championships	Grand Slams	Succeeded by 2010 Australian Open
Preceded by New Haven	2009 US Open Series	Succeeded by None
