= 2009 Pilot Pen Tennis – Men's singles =

Tennis tournament

Men's singles
- 2009 Pilot Pen Tennis

Final
- Champion: (Spain) Fernando Verdasco
- Runner-up: (United States) Sam Querrey
- Score: 6–4, 7–6^{(8–6)}

Events
| Singles | men | women |
| Doubles | men | women |
| ← 2008 · | Pilot Pen Tennis | · 2010 → |

Marin Čilić was the defending champion, but chose not to participate that year.

Fernando Verdasco won in the final 6–4, 7–6^{(8–6)} against Sam Querrey.

== Seeds ==
All seeds receive a bye into the second round.

1. (Russia) Nikolay Davydenko (quarterfinals)
2. (Spain) Fernando Verdasco (champion)
3. (Spain) Tommy Robredo (second round)
4. (Spain) David Ferrer (withdrew)
5. (United States) Mardy Fish (second round)
6. (United States) Sam Querrey (final)
7. (Russia) Igor Andreev (semifinals)
8. (Romania) Victor Hănescu (third round)
9. (Spain) Nicolás Almagro (second round)
10. (France) Jérémy Chardy (second round)
11. (Austria) Jürgen Melzer (quarterfinals)
12. (Germany) Philipp Petzschner (second round)
13. (Germany) Andreas Beck (second round)
14. (Russia) Igor Kunitsyn (third round)
15. (France) Fabrice Santoro (third round)
16. (Italy) Andreas Seppi (third round)

== Draw ==
=== Key ===
- Q = Qualifier
- WC = Wild card
- LL = Lucky loser
- Alt = Alternate
- ITF = ITF entry
- PR = Protected ranking
- SR = Special ranking
- SE = Special exempt
- JE = Junior exempt
- JR = Junior Accelerator Programme entrant
- CO = College Accelerator Programme entrant
- NG = Next Gen Accelerator Program entrant
- w/o = Walkover
- r = Retired
- d = Defaulted

=== Finals ===
Quarterfinals
1 | (Russia) Nikolay Davydenko | 3 | 6 | 4
6 | (United States) Sam Querrey | 6 | 3 | 6
(Argentina) José Acasuso | 7 | 6
(France) Florent Serra | 5 | 4
7 | (Russia) Igor Andreev | 6 | 6^{4} | 6
(Argentina) Leonardo Mayer | 4 | 7 | 3
11 | (Austria) Jürgen Melzer | 3 | 1
2/WC | (Spain) Fernando Verdasco | 6 | 6

Semifinals
6 | (United States) Sam Querrey | 6 | 6
(Argentina) José Acasuso | 3 | 4
7 | (Russia) Igor Andreev | 6^{4} | 6^{5}
2/WC | (Spain) Fernando Verdasco | 7 | 7

Final
6 | (United States) Sam Querrey | 4 | 6^{6}
2/WC | (Spain) Fernando Verdasco | 6 | 7

=== Top half ===
==== Section 1 ====
First round
Q | (Denmark) F Nielsen | 3 | 5
(United States) R Kendrick | 6 | 7
(Germany) M Zverev | 3 | 6 | 3
(Italy) P Starace | 6 | 2 | 6
(Germany) B Phau | 2 | 6 | 6
(Germany) B Becker | 6 | 2 | 3
(France) M Gicquel | 6 | 6
(Argentina) M Vassallo Argüello | 3 | 4

Second round
1 | (Russia) N Davydenko | 7 | 6
(United States) R Kendrick | 6^{10} | 3
(Italy) P Starace | 5 | 0
15 | (France) F Santoro | 7 | 6
9 | (Spain) N Almagro | 6 | 3 | 5
(Germany) B Phau | 2 | 6 | 7
(France) M Gicquel | 4 | 7 | 2
6 | (United States) S Querrey | 6 | 6^{3} | 6

Third round
1 | (Russia) N Davydenko | 7 | 6
15 | (France) F Santoro | 5 | 3
(Germany) B Phau | 5 | 3
6 | (United States) S Querrey | 7 | 6

Quarterfinals
1 | (Russia) N Davydenko | 3 | 6 | 4
6 | (United States) S Querrey | 6 | 3 | 6

==== Section 2 ====
First round
(Argentina) M González | 1 | 7 | 2
(Argentina) J Acasuso | 6 | 6^{7} | 6
(Croatia) I Ljubičić | 3 | 4
WC | (United States) T Dent | 6 | 6
(Belgium) S Darcis | 3 | 3
(France) F Serra | 6 | 6
Q | (Ecuador) N Lapentti | 5 | 6 | 6^{3}
WC | (United States) R Ram | 7 | 1 | 7

Second round
3 | (Spain) T Robredo | 6 | 5 | 6^{5}
(Argentina) J Acasuso | 3 | 7 | 7
WC | (United States) T Dent | 3 | 4
14 | (Russia) I Kunitsyn | 6 | 6
10 | (France) J Chardy | 7 | 6^{4} | 1
(France) F Serra | 6^{8} | 7 | 6
WC | (United States) R Ram | 6 | 6
5 | (United States) M Fish | 3 | 3

Third round
(Argentina) J Acasuso | 3 | 7 | 6
14 | (Russia) I Kunitsyn | 6 | 6^{3} | 3
(France) F Serra | 4 | 7 | 7
WC | (United States) R Ram | 6 | 6^{6} | 5

Quarterfinals
(Argentina) J Acasuso | 7 | 6
(France) F Serra | 5 | 4

=== Bottom half ===
==== Section 3 ====
First round
(United States) K Kim | 6 | 5 | 6
(Russia) T Gabashvili | 4 | 7 | 3
Q | (Portugal) F Gil | 6 | 6
WC | (Cyprus) M Baghdatis | 4 | 3
(Italy) S Bolelli | 6 | 6
(Belgium) C Rochus | 3 | 4
(Uzbekistan) D Istomin | 2 | 4
(Argentina) L Mayer | 6 | 6

Second round
7 | (Russia) I Andreev | 6 | 6
(United States) K Kim | 3 | 1
Q | (Portugal) F Gil | 6^{2} | 7 | 6
12 | (Germany) P Petzschner | 7 | 6^{8} | 3
13 | (Germany) A Beck | 4 | 4
(Italy) S Bolelli | 6 | 6
(Argentina) L Mayer | 6 | 6
LL | (Belgium) O Rochus | 0 | 4

Third round
7 | (Russia) I Andreev | 6 | 6
Q | (Portugal) F Gil | 4 | 4
(Italy) S Bolelli | 2 | 4
(Argentina) L Mayer | 6 | 6

Quarterfinals
7 | (Russia) I Andreev | 6 | 6^{4} | 6
(Argentina) L Mayer | 4 | 7 | 3

==== Section 4 ====
First round
(Serbia) J Tipsarević | 7 | 2
(Italy) F Fognini | 5 | 0 | r
(Kazakhstan) A Golubev | 3 | 4
Q | (Uruguay) P Cuevas | 6 | 6
(Chinese Taipei) Y-h Lu | 6 | 6
(Spain) G García López | 2 | 2
(Finland) J Nieminen | 5 | 3
(Chile) P Capdeville | 7 | 6

Second round
8 | (Romania) V Hănescu | 6 | 6^{8} | 6
(Serbia) J Tipsarević | 4 | 7 | 3
Q | (Uruguay) P Cuevas | 2 | 0 | r
11 | (Austria) J Melzer | 6 | 3
16 | (Italy) A Seppi | 6^{5} | 6 | 7
(Chinese Taipei) Y-h Lu | 7 | 3 | 5
(Chile) P Capdeville | 0 | 3
2/WC | (Spain) F Verdasco | 6 | 6

Third round
8 | (Romania) V Hănescu | 6^{5} | 6 | 1
11 | (Austria) J Melzer | 7 | 4 | 6
16 | (Italy) A Seppi | 6^{3} | 2
2/WC | (Spain) F Verdasco | 7 | 6

Quarterfinals
11 | (Austria) J Melzer | 3 | 1
2/WC | (Spain) F Verdasco | 6 | 6
