= 2010 Pilot Pen Tennis – Women's singles =

Women's singles
- 2010 Pilot Pen Tennis

Final
- Champion: (Denmark) Caroline Wozniacki
- Runner-up: (Russia) Nadia Petrova
- Score: 6–3, 3–6, 6–3

Details
- Draw: 30
- Seeds: 8

Events
Singles	men	women
Doubles	men	women
- Pilot Pen Tennis

Caroline Wozniacki was the two-time defending champion and won the title for the third year in a row, defeating Nadia Petrova 6–3, 3–6, 6–3 in the final.

== Seeds ==
The top two seeds receive a bye into the second round.

1. (Denmark) Caroline Wozniacki (champion)
2. (Australia) Samantha Stosur (quarterfinals)
3. (Italy) Francesca Schiavone (first round)
4. (Russia) Elena Dementieva (semifinals)
5. (Belgium) Yanina Wickmayer (first round)
6. (France) Marion Bartoli (quarterfinals)
7. (Italy) Flavia Pennetta (quarterfinals, withdrew due to right foot injury)
8. (Russia) Nadia Petrova (final)

== Draw ==
Key

- Q = Qualifier
- WC = Wild card
- LL = Lucky loser
- Alt = Alternate
- ITF = ITF entry
- PR = Protected ranking
- SR = Special ranking
- SE = Special exempt
- JE = Junior exempt
- JR = Junior Accelerator Programme entrant
- CO = College Accelerator Programme entrant
- NG = Next Gen Accelerator Program entrant
- w/o = Walkover
- r = Retired
- d = Defaulted

=== Finals ===
Semifinals
1	(Denmark) Caroline Wozniacki	1	6	7
4/WC	(Russia) Elena Dementieva	6	3	6^{5}
(Russia) Maria Kirilenko	6	2	2
8/WC	(Russia) Nadia Petrova	2	6	6

Final
1	(Denmark) Caroline Wozniacki	6	3	6
8/WC	(Russia) Nadia Petrova	3	6	3

=== Top half ===
First round
LL	(Slovakia) D Cibulková	6	5	6
(United States) M Oudin	2	7	4
(Germany) A Petkovic	2	2
(Belarus) O Govortsova	6	6
(Russia) A Kleybanova	4	4
7	(Italy) F Pennetta	6	6
4/WC	(Russia) E Dementieva	6	6
(Spain) MJ Martínez Sánchez	1	2
(Czech Republic) P Kvitová	5	3
(Ukraine) K Bondarenko	7	6
(Bulgaria) T Pironkova	1	5
Q	(Australia) A Rodionova	6	7
(Ukraine) A Bondarenko	7	6^{2}	3
6	(France) M Bartoli	6^{4}	7	6

Second round
1	(Denmark) C Wozniacki	6	6
LL	(Slovakia) D Cibulková	4	1
(Belarus) O Govortsova	3	2
7	(Italy) F Pennetta	6	6
4/WC	(Russia) E Dementieva	7	6^{5}	6
(Ukraine) K Bondarenko	6^{4}	7	4
Q	(Australia) A Rodionova	3	1
6	(France) M Bartoli	6	6

Quarterfinals
1	(Denmark) C Wozniacki	w/o
7	(Italy) F Pennetta
4/WC	(Russia) E Dementieva	6	3	6
6	(France) M Bartoli	3	6	2

Semifinals
1	(Denmark) C Wozniacki	1	6	7
4/WC	(Russia) E Dementieva	6	3	6^{5}

=== Bottom half ===
First round
5	(Belgium) Y Wickmayer	3	1
(Switzerland) T Bacsinszky	6	6
Q	(Russia) E Vesnina	1	6	1
(Russia) M Kirilenko	6	3	6
(Slovakia) D Hantuchová	7	6
(Estonia) K Kanepi	5	3
WC	(Russia) D Safina	1	6	6
3	(Italy) F Schiavone	6	3	1
8/WC	(Russia) N Petrova	1	7	6
Q	(United States) V Lepchenko	6	5	1
(Romania) A Dulgheru	2	1
Q	(United States) B Mattek-Sands	6	6
(Italy) S Errani	6	6
(China) J Zheng	1	2

Second round
(Switzerland) T Bacsinszky	3	1
(Russia) M Kirilenko	6	6
(Slovakia) D Hantuchová	6^{4}	6^{2}
WC	(Russia) D Safina	7	7
8/WC	(Russia) N Petrova	6	6
Q	(United States) B Mattek-Sands	3	2
(Italy) S Errani	1	6	6^{4}
2/WC	(Australia) S Stosur	6	3	7

Quarterfinals
(Russia) M Kirilenko	6	6
WC	(Russia) D Safina	3	3
8/WC	(Russia) N Petrova	6	6
2/WC	(Australia) S Stosur	2	1

Semifinals
(Russia) M Kirilenko	6	2	2
8/WC	(Russia) N Petrova	2	6	6
