= 2010 Pilot Pen Tennis =

- Date: August 23–28
- Edition: 42nd
- Surface: Hard / outdoor
- Location: New Haven, CN, US
- Venue: Cullman-Heyman Tennis Center

Champions

Men's singles
- (Ukraine) Sergiy Stakhovsky

Women's singles
- (Denmark) Caroline Wozniacki

Men's doubles
- (Sweden) Robert Lindstedt / (Romania) Horia Tecău

Women's doubles
- (Czech Republic) Květa Peschke / (Slovenia) Katarina Srebotnik
- Pilot Pen Tennis

The 2010 Pilot Pen Tennis was a tennis tournament played on outdoor hard courts. It was the 42nd edition of the Pilot Pen Tennis, and was part of the ATP World Tour 250 Series of the 2010 ATP World Tour, and of the Premier Series of the 2010 WTA Tour. It took place at the Cullman-Heyman Tennis Center in New Haven, Connecticut, United States, from August 23 through August 28, 2010. It was the last event on the 2010 US Open Series before the 2010 US Open.

== Finals ==
=== Men's singles ===
(Ukraine) Sergiy Stakhovsky defeated (Uzbekistan) Denis Istomin, 3–6, 6–3, 6–4

- It was Stakhovsky's 2nd title of the year and 4th of his career.

=== Women's singles ===
(Denmark) Caroline Wozniacki defeated (Russia) Nadia Petrova 6–3, 3–6, 6–3

- It was Wozniacki's fourth title of the year, and the tenth of her career. It was her third consecutive win at the event, also winning in 2008 and 2009.

=== Men's doubles ===
(Sweden) Robert Lindstedt / (Romania) Horia Tecău defeated (India) Rohan Bopanna / (Pakistan) Aisam-ul-Haq Qureshi, 6–4, 7–5

=== Women's doubles ===
(Czech Republic) Květa Peschke / (Slovenia) Katarina Srebotnik defeated (United States) Bethanie Mattek-Sands / (United States) Meghann Shaughnessy, 7–5, 6–0

== ATP entrants ==
=== Seeds ===
Player	Nationality	Ranking*	Seed
Marcos Baghdatis	Cyprus	20	1
Thomaz Bellucci	Brazil	25	2
Fernando González	Chile	29	3
~~Mardy Fish~~	~~United States~~	~~36~~	~~4~~
Andrey Golubev	Kazakhstan	38	5
Tommy Robredo	(Spain)	39	6
Alexandr Dolgopolov	Ukraine	43	7
Florian Mayer	(Germany)	45	8
Sergiy Stakhovsky	Ukraine	46	9
Victor Troicki	Serbia	47	10
Xavier Malisse	Belgium	49	11
Thiemo de Bakker	Netherlands	50	12
Michael Berrer	(Germany)	51	13
Juan Ignacio Chela	Argentina	52	14
Denis Istomin	Uzbekistan	53	15
Victor Hănescu	Romania	54	16

- Seedings are based on the rankings of August 16, 2010.

=== Other entrants ===
The following players received wildcards into the singles main draw

- (United States) James Blake
- (United States) Taylor Dent
- (Chile) Fernando González
- (United States) Donald Young

The following players received entry from the qualifying draw:

- (Canada) Philip Bester
- (Jamaica) Dustin Brown
- (Russia) Teymuraz Gabashvili
- (Kazakhstan) Mikhail Kukushkin

The following player received the lucky loser spot:

- (Czech Republic) Radek Štěpánek

== WTA entrants ==
=== Seeds ===
Player	Nationality	Ranking*	Seed
Caroline Wozniacki	Denmark	2	1
Samantha Stosur	Australia	6	2
Francesca Schiavone	Italy	7	3
Elena Dementieva	Russia	8	4
Yanina Wickmayer	Belgium	15	5
Marion Bartoli	France	17	6
Flavia Pennetta	Italy	20	7
Nadia Petrova	Russia	21	8

- Seedings are based on the rankings of August 16, 2010.

=== Other entrants ===
The following players received wildcard into the singles main draw

- (Russia) Elena Dementieva
- (Russia) Nadia Petrova^{1}
- (Russia) Dinara Safina
- (Australia) Samantha Stosur
- (Serbia) ~~Ana Ivanovic~~

^{1} Nadia Petrova received the wildcard originally allocated to Ana Ivanovic after the latter withdrew from the tournament due to an ankle injury suffered at Cincinnati.

The following players received entry from the qualifying draw:

- (United States) Varvara Lepchenko
- (United States) Bethanie Mattek-Sands
- (Australia) Anastasia Rodionova
- (Russia) Elena Vesnina

The following player received the lucky loser spot:

- (Slovakia) Dominika Cibulková

Preceded by Cincinnati	2010 US Open Series; Men's Events	Succeeded by New York – US Open
Preceded by Montreal	2010 US Open Series; Women's Events	Succeeded by New York – US Open
