= 2009 Pilot Pen Tennis – Women's doubles =

Women's doubles
- 2009 Pilot Pen Tennis

Final
- Champions: (Spain) Nuria Llagostera Vives (Spain) María José Martínez Sánchez
- Runners-up: (Czech Republic) Iveta Benešová (Czech Republic) Lucie Hradecká
- Score: 6-2, 7-5

Events
Singles	men	women
Doubles	men	women
- Pilot Pen Tennis

Květa Peschke and Lisa Raymond were the defending champions, but Peschke chose not to compete that year.
Raymond partnered with Jill Craybas, but they lost in the semifinals against Nuria Llagostera Vives and María José Martínez Sánchez.

Nuria Llagostera Vives and María José Martínez Sánchez won in the final 6-2, 7-5 against Iveta Benešová and Lucie Hradecká.

== Seeds ==
1. (Spain) Nuria Llagostera Vives / (Spain) María José Martínez Sánchez (champions)
2. (Chinese Taipei) Chuang Chia-jung / (China) Yan Zi (first round)
3. (United States) Jill Craybas / (United States) Lisa Raymond (semifinals)
4. (Ukraine) Alyona Bondarenko / (Ukraine) Kateryna Bondarenko (semifinals, retired due to left thigh strain of Kateryna Bondarenko)

== Draw ==
Key

- Q = Qualifier
- WC = Wild card
- LL = Lucky loser
- Alt = Alternate
- ITF = ITF entry
- PR = Protected ranking
- SR = Special ranking
- SE = Special exempt
- JE = Junior exempt
- JR = Junior Accelerator Programme entrant
- CO = College Accelerator Programme entrant
- NG = Next Gen Accelerator Program entrant
- w/o = Walkover
- r = Retired
- d = Defaulted

First round
1	(Spain) N Llagostera Vives (Spain) MJ Martínez Sánchez	6	6
WC	(Australia) A Molik (United States) M Shaughnessy	1	1
(Slovakia) J Husárová (Russia) M Kirilenko	7	5	[4]
(Turkey) İ Şenoğlu (Kazakhstan) Y Shvedova	5	7	[10]
3	(United States) J Craybas (United States) L Raymond	6	6
(Poland) K Jans (Poland) A Rosolska	3	2
(United Kingdom) S Borwell (United States) R Kops-Jones	6	3	[10]
(Romania) M Niculescu (Romania) IR Olaru	2	6	[8]
(Russia) M Kondratieva (France) S Lefèvre	3	2
(France) A Cornet (Romania) E Gallovits	6	6
(Italy) T Garbin (Spain) A Medina Garrigues	2	6	[7]
4	(Ukraine) A Bondarenko (Ukraine) K Bondarenko	6	3	[10]
(Italy) S Errani (Italy) F Pennetta	1	1
(Czech Republic) I Benešová (Czech Republic) L Hradecká	6	6
(Latvia) L Dekmeijere (Poland) U Radwańska	7	4	[10]
2	(Chinese Taipei) C-j Chuang (China) Z Yan	5	6	[8]

Quarterfinals
1	(Spain) N Llagostera Vives (Spain) MJ Martínez Sánchez	6	6
(Turkey) İ Şenoğlu (Kazakhstan) Y Shvedova	2	1
3	(United States) J Craybas (United States) L Raymond	6	6
(United Kingdom) S Borwell (United States) R Kops-Jones	3	2
(France) A Cornet (Romania) E Gallovits	3	5
4	(Ukraine) A Bondarenko (Ukraine) K Bondarenko	6	7
(Czech Republic) I Benešová (Czech Republic) L Hradecká	3	6	[10]
(Latvia) L Dekmeijere (Poland) U Radwańska	6	2	[7]

Semifinals
1	(Spain) N Llagostera Vives (Spain) MJ Martínez Sánchez	6	6
3	(United States) J Craybas (United States) L Raymond	3	3
4	(Ukraine) A Bondarenko (Ukraine) K Bondarenko	4	0	r
(Czech Republic) I Benešová (Czech Republic) L Hradecká	6	2

Final
1	(Spain) N Llagostera Vives (Spain) MJ Martínez Sánchez	6	7
(Czech Republic) I Benešová (Czech Republic) L Hradecká	2	5
