= 2015 French Open – Women's singles qualifying =

Women's singles qualifying
- 2015 French Open

Events
Singles	men	women		boys	girls
Doubles	men	women	mixed	boys	girls
WC Singles	men	women	quad
WC Doubles	men	women	quad
Legends	−45	45+	women

Qualification
Singles	men	women
- French Open

== Seeds ==
1. (Brazil) Teliana Pereira (qualified)
2. (Colombia) Mariana Duque Mariño (second round)
3. (Bulgaria) Sesil Karatantcheva (qualified)
4. (China) Zhu Lin (first round)
5. (Poland) Urszula Radwańska (first round)
6. (Slovakia) Jana Čepelová (second round)
7. (Russia) Elizaveta Kulichkova (second round)
8. (Czech Republic) Kristýna Plíšková (first round)
9. (Spain) Lourdes Domínguez Lino (qualified)
10. (Israel) Julia Glushko (first round)
11. (Russia) Margarita Gasparyan (qualified)
12. (China) Duan Yingying (first round)
13. (Israel) Shahar Pe'er (qualifying competition)
14. (Slovakia) Kristína Kučová (first round)
15. (Netherlands) Richèl Hogenkamp (first round)
16. (Belarus) Olga Govortsova (first round)
17. (Portugal) Michelle Larcher de Brito (first round)
18. (Belarus) Aliaksandra Sasnovich (first round)
19. (Russia) Alla Kudryavtseva (first round)
20. (Tunisia) Ons Jabeur (second round)
21. (Chinese Taipei) Hsieh Su-wei (first round)
22. (United States) Anna Tatishvili (second round)
23. (Germany) Laura Siegemund (second round)
24. (United States) Grace Min (second round)

== Qualifiers ==
1. (Brazil) Teliana Pereira
2. (Paraguay) Verónica Cepede Royg
3. (Bulgaria) Sesil Karatantcheva
4. (Australia) Olivia Rogowska
5. (Croatia) Petra Martić
6. (United States) Alexa Glatch
7. (United Kingdom) Johanna Konta
8. (Germany) Dinah Pfizenmaier
9. (Spain) Lourdes Domínguez Lino
10. (Czech Republic) Andrea Hlaváčková
11. (Russia) Margarita Gasparyan
12. (Poland) Paula Kania

== Draw ==
Key

- Q = Qualifier
- WC = Wild card
- LL = Lucky loser
- Alt = Alternate
- ITF = ITF entry
- PR = Protected ranking
- SR = Special ranking
- SE = Special exempt
- JE = Junior exempt
- JR = Junior Accelerator Programme entrant
- CO = College Accelerator Programme entrant
- NG = Next Gen Accelerator Program entrant
- w/o = Walkover
- r = Retired
- d = Defaulted

=== First qualifier ===
First round
1	(Brazil) Teliana Pereira	7	6
(France) Stéphanie Foretz	5	1
(Czech Republic) Renata Voráčová	7^{7}	6
(Russia) Alexandra Panova	6^{3}	2
PR	(Canada) Heidi El Tabakh	3	5
(Spain) Laura Pous Tió	6	7
WC	(France) Harmony Tan	0	1
24	(United States) Grace Min	6	6

Second round
1	(Brazil) Teliana Pereira	6	6
(Czech Republic) Renata Voráčová	0	4
(Spain) Laura Pous Tió	6	6
24	(United States) Grace Min	3	2

Qualifying competition
1	(Brazil) Teliana Pereira	3	6	7
(Spain) Laura Pous Tió	6	0	5

=== Second qualifier ===
First round
2	(Colombia) Mariana Duque Mariño	6	6
(Uzbekistan) Nigina Abduraimova	1	2
(Japan) Junri Namigata	3	0
(Romania) Sorana Cîrstea	6	6
(Paraguay) Verónica Cepede Royg	6	6
(United States) Catherine Bellis	4	0
(Switzerland) Romina Oprandi	1	1
23	(Germany) Laura Siegemund	6	6

Second round
2	(Colombia) Mariana Duque Mariño	5	6	3
(Romania) Sorana Cîrstea	7	2	6
(Paraguay) Verónica Cepede Royg	6	7
23	(Germany) Laura Siegemund	3	5

Qualifying competition
(Romania) Sorana Cîrstea	1	3
(Paraguay) Verónica Cepede Royg	6	6

=== Third qualifier ===
First round
3	(Bulgaria) Sesil Karatantcheva	4	6	6
(Bulgaria) Elitsa Kostova	6	2	1
(United States) Maria Sanchez	6	6
(Japan) Risa Ozaki	1	1
PR	(France) Aravane Rezaï	5	3
WC	(France) Julie Coin	7	6
(Austria) Tamira Paszek	6	6
21	(Chinese Taipei) Hsieh Su-wei	4	4

Second round
3	(Bulgaria) Sesil Karatantcheva	6	6^{5}	6
(United States) Maria Sanchez	3	7^{7}	1
WC	(France) Julie Coin	6^{2}	4
(Austria) Tamira Paszek	7^{7}	6

Qualifying competition
3	(Bulgaria) Sesil Karatantcheva	6	6
(Austria) Tamira Paszek	1	3

=== Fourth qualifier ===
First round
4	(China) Zhu Lin	2	1
PR	(Italy) Nastassja Burnett	6	6
(Japan) Hiroko Kuwata	1	7	2
(Brazil) Beatriz Haddad Maia	6	5	6
(Austria) Patricia Mayr-Achleitner	2	4
WC	(France) Tessah Andrianjafitrimo	6	6
(Australia) Olivia Rogowska	6	6
18	(Belarus) Aliaksandra Sasnovich	2	3

Second round
PR	(Italy) Nastassja Burnett	3	3
(Brazil) Beatriz Haddad Maia	6	6
WC	(France) Tessah Andrianjafitrimo	6	3	4
(Australia) Olivia Rogowska	3	6	6

Qualifying competition
(Brazil) Beatriz Haddad Maia	6	6^{5}	3
(Australia) Olivia Rogowska	3	7^{7}	6

=== Fifth qualifier ===
First round
5	(Poland) Urszula Radwańska	3	4
(Chinese Taipei) Chan Yung-jan	6	6
(Russia) Marina Melnikova	3	7^{7}	3
(Croatia) Petra Martić	6	6^{2}	6
(Japan) Kimiko Date-Krumm	4	3
(Croatia) Tereza Mrdeža	6	6
(Belgium) Ysaline Bonaventure	3	2
20	(Tunisia) Ons Jabeur	6	6

Second round
(Chinese Taipei) Chan Yung-jan	4	2
(Croatia) Petra Martić	6	6
(Croatia) Tereza Mrdeža	6	2	9
20	(Tunisia) Ons Jabeur	3	6	7

Qualifying competition
(Croatia) Petra Martić	5	6	6
(Croatia) Tereza Mrdeža	7	2	2

=== Sixth qualifier ===
First round
6	(Slovakia) Jana Čepelová	7	6
(Ukraine) Anastasiya Vasylyeva	5	3
(Japan) Shuko Aoyama	1	4
(Ukraine) Kateryna Bondarenko	6	6
(Russia) Ekaterina Bychkova	6^{3}	6	7
(United States) Sachia Vickery	7^{7}	3	5
PR	(United States) Alexa Glatch	6	4	8
16	(Belarus) Olga Govortsova	2	6	6

Second round
6	(Slovakia) Jana Čepelová	1	0
(Ukraine) Kateryna Bondarenko	6	6
(Russia) Ekaterina Bychkova	6^{12}	2
PR	(United States) Alexa Glatch	7^{14}	6

Qualifying competition
(Ukraine) Kateryna Bondarenko	2	6	3
PR	(United States) Alexa Glatch	6	3	6

=== Seventh qualifier ===
First round
7	(Russia) Elizaveta Kulichkova	6	6
(China) Xu Yifan	2	2
(Serbia) Jovana Jakšić	0	3
(United Kingdom) Johanna Konta	6	6
(Estonia) Anett Kontaveit	6	7^{7}
WC	(United States) Katerina Stewart	3	6^{3}
WC	(France) Clothilde de Bernardi	4	6	6
17	(Portugal) Michelle Larcher de Brito	6	2	4

Second round
7	(Russia) Elizaveta Kulichkova	6^{1}	3
(United Kingdom) Johanna Konta	7^{7}	6
(Estonia) Anett Kontaveit	6	4	4
WC	(France) Clothilde de Bernardi	2	6	6

Qualifying competition
(United Kingdom) Johanna Konta	6	6
WC	(France) Clothilde de Bernardi	2	1

=== Eighth qualifier ===
First round
8	(Czech Republic) Kristýna Plíšková	4	4
(Canada) Gabriela Dabrowski	6	6
PR	(Russia) Vera Dushevina	4	6	6
(Latvia) Jeļena Ostapenko	6	3	3
(Uzbekistan) Akgul Amanmuradova	6	5	3
(Germany) Dinah Pfizenmaier	1	7	6
(China) Liu Fangzhou	3	6^{7}
22	(United States) Anna Tatishvili	6	7^{9}

Second round
(Canada) Gabriela Dabrowski	3	3
PR	(Russia) Vera Dushevina	6	6
(Germany) Dinah Pfizenmaier	7^{7}	6
22	(United States) Anna Tatishvili	6^{4}	2

Qualifying competition
PR	(Russia) Vera Dushevina	6	3	1
(Germany) Dinah Pfizenmaier	0	6	6

=== Ninth qualifier ===
First round
9	(Spain) Lourdes Domínguez Lino	6	6
(Japan) Misa Eguchi	0	4
(Czech Republic) Barbora Krejčíková	6	6
(Peru) Bianca Botto	2	2
(Romania) Ana Bogdan	4	1
(Romania) Patricia Maria Țig	6	6
(Spain) Sara Sorribes Tormo	2	4
13	(Israel) Shahar Pe'er	6	6

Second round
9	(Spain) Lourdes Domínguez Lino	6	6
(Czech Republic) Barbora Krejčíková	4	3
(Romania) Patricia Maria Țig	7	4	1
13	(Israel) Shahar Pe'er	5	6	6

Qualifying competition
9	(Spain) Lourdes Domínguez Lino	6	6
13	(Israel) Shahar Pe'er	2	2

=== Tenth qualifier ===
First round
10	(Israel) Julia Glushko	6	4	5
(Australia) Anastasia Rodionova	0	6	7
(United Kingdom) Naomi Broady	6	7^{7}
(Turkey) Çağla Büyükakçay	1	6^{4}
(Italy) Alberta Brianti	6	6
(Japan) Eri Hozumi	1	1
(Czech Republic) Andrea Hlaváčková	6	6
14	(Slovakia) Kristína Kučová	3	0

Second round
(Australia) Anastasia Rodionova	6	6
(United Kingdom) Naomi Broady	1	1
(Italy) Alberta Brianti	4	7^{9}	3
(Czech Republic) Andrea Hlaváčková	6	6^{7}	6

Qualifying competition
(Australia) Anastasia Rodionova	2	7^{7}	3
(Czech Republic) Andrea Hlaváčková	6	6^{5}	6

=== Eleventh qualifier ===
First round
11	(Russia) Margarita Gasparyan	6	6
(Liechtenstein) Stephanie Vogt	2	2
(China) Zhang Kailin	6	6
(Argentina) Paula Ormaechea	4	0
(Ukraine) Maryna Zanevska	6	6
WC	(France) Myrtille Georges	2	3
(China) Wang Yafan	2	7^{9}	8
15	(Netherlands) Richèl Hogenkamp	6	6^{7}	6

Second round
11	(Russia) Margarita Gasparyan	6	6
(China) Zhang Kailin	1	0
(Ukraine) Maryna Zanevska	0	6	9
(China) Wang Yafan	6	4	7

Qualifying competition
11	(Russia) Margarita Gasparyan	6	6^{5}	6
(Ukraine) Maryna Zanevska	3	7^{7}	4

=== Twelfth qualifier ===
First round
12	(China) Duan Yingying	7	2	3
PR	(Russia) Victoria Kan	5	6	6
PR	(United States) Jessica Pegula	6	6
(Ukraine) Yuliya Beygelzimer	4	3
WC	(France) Chloé Paquet	6	7
WC	(France) Lou Brouleau	2	5
(Poland) Paula Kania	7	6
19	(Russia) Alla Kudryavtseva	5	4

Second round
PR	(Russia) Victoria Kan	6^{4}	2
PR	(United States) Jessica Pegula	7^{7}	6
WC	(France) Chloé Paquet	2	6	4
(Poland) Paula Kania	6	4	6

Qualifying competition
PR	(United States) Jessica Pegula	5	2
(Poland) Paula Kania	7	6
