= 2015 French Open – Men's singles qualifying =

Men's singles qualifying
- 2015 French Open

Events
Singles	men	women		boys	girls
Doubles	men	women	mixed	boys	girls
WC Singles	men	women	quad
WC Doubles	men	women	quad
Legends	−45	45+	women

Qualification
Singles	men	women
- French Open

This article displays the qualifying draw for men's singles at the 2015 French Open.

== Seeds ==
1. (South Korea) Chung Hyeon (first round)
2. (Germany) Alexander Zverev (second round)
3. (Argentina) Facundo Bagnis (second round)
4. (Slovenia) Blaž Rola (second round)
5. (Germany) Dustin Brown (first round)
6. (Italy) Luca Vanni (qualified)
7. (Slovakia) Norbert Gombos (second round)
8. (United Kingdom) James Ward (second round)
9. (Colombia) Alejandro González (first round)
10. (Belgium) Kimmer Coppejans (qualified)
11. (Colombia) Alejandro Falla (qualifying competition, lucky loser)
12. (Spain) Adrián Menéndez-Maceiras (qualifying competition)
13. (Argentina) Guido Pella (second round)
14. (Kazakhstan) Aleksandr Nedovyesov (first round)
15. (Germany) Tobias Kamke (withdrew)
16. (United States) Austin Krajicek (first round)
17. (United Kingdom) Kyle Edmund (qualified)
18. (Italy) Marco Cecchinato (qualifying competition)
19. (Germany) Matthias Bachinger (qualified)
20. (Russia) Alexander Kudryavtsev (second round)
21. (Ukraine) Illya Marchenko (qualified)
22. (Spain) Albert Montañés (second round)
23. (Uzbekistan) Farrukh Dustov (first round)
24. (Moldova) Radu Albot (second round)
25. (Australia) John Millman (first round)
26. (Netherlands) Thiemo de Bakker (second round)
27. (Georgia (country)) Nikoloz Basilashvili (qualified)
28. (Spain) Daniel Muñoz de la Nava (second round)
29. (Kazakhstan) Andrey Golubev (qualifying competition, lucky loser)
30. (United States) Denis Kudla (first round)
31. (Argentina) Facundo Argüello (qualifying competition, lucky loser)
32. (Poland) Michał Przysiężny (second round)

== Qualifiers ==
1. (Georgia (country)) Nikoloz Basilashvili
2. (Netherlands) Igor Sijsling
3. (Italy) Andrea Arnaboldi
4. (Sweden) Elias Ymer
5. (Japan) Taro Daniel
6. (Italy) Luca Vanni
7. (Japan) Yoshihito Nishioka
8. (Sweden) Christian Lindell
9. (France) Stéphane Robert
10. (Belgium) Kimmer Coppejans
11. (Belgium) Germain Gigounon
12. (United Kingdom) Kyle Edmund
13. (Portugal) Gastão Elias
14. (Germany) Matthias Bachinger
15. (Ukraine) Illya Marchenko
16. (Germany) Michael Berrer

== Lucky losers ==
1. (Colombia) Alejandro Falla
2. (Kazakhstan) Andrey Golubev
3. (Argentina) Facundo Argüello

== Draw ==
=== First qualifier ===
First round
1/WC	(South Korea) Chung Hyeon	0	1
(United States) Jared Donaldson	6	6
(Argentina) Guido Andreozzi	4	6^{4}
(India) Ramkumar Ramanathan	6	7^{7}
(United States) Bjorn Fratangelo	6	7^{7}
(Australia) Alex Bolt	4	6^{5}
(Serbia) Laslo Djere	4	4
27	(Georgia (country)) Nikoloz Basilashvili	6	6

Second round
(United States) Jared Donaldson	6	6
(India) Ramkumar Ramanathan	2	0
(United States) Bjorn Fratangelo	1	7^{11}	3
27	(Georgia (country)) Nikoloz Basilashvili	6	6^{9}	6

Qualifying competition
(United States) Jared Donaldson	2	6	2
27	(Georgia (country)) Nikoloz Basilashvili	6	4	6

=== Second qualifier ===
First round
2	(Germany) Alexander Zverev	7^{7}	6
(Argentina) Horacio Zeballos	6^{4}	0
WC	(United States) Mitchell Krueger	6	6^{1}	1
(Netherlands) Igor Sijsling	4	7^{7}	6
(Romania) Marius Copil	6^{0}	6	6
PR	(Portugal) Pedro Sousa	7^{7}	3	4
(Australia) John-Patrick Smith	6	1	6
25	(Australia) John Millman	4	6	3

Second round
2	(Germany) Alexander Zverev	6^{0}	6	5
(Netherlands) Igor Sijsling	7^{7}	2	7
(Romania) Marius Copil	6	6
(Australia) John-Patrick Smith	3	4

Qualifying competition
(Netherlands) Igor Sijsling	6	6
(Romania) Marius Copil	2	4

=== Third qualifier ===
First round
3	(Argentina) Facundo Bagnis	5	6	6
(Germany) Julian Reister	7	3	2
(Argentina) Marco Trungelliti	7	6
(Netherlands) Boy Westerhof	5	2
(France) Pierre-Hugues Herbert	6	6
(Argentina) Renzo Olivo	4	1
(Italy) Andrea Arnaboldi	4	6	6
30	(United States) Denis Kudla	6	3	2

Second round
3	(Argentina) Facundo Bagnis	1	3
(Argentina) Marco Trungelliti	6	6
(France) Pierre-Hugues Herbert	4	6	25
(Italy) Andrea Arnaboldi	6	3	27

Qualifying competition
(Argentina) Marco Trungelliti	7	5	3
(Italy) Andrea Arnaboldi	5	7	6

=== Fourth qualifier ===
First round
4	(Slovenia) Blaž Rola	6	6
(Spain) Rubén Ramírez Hidalgo	1	4
(Sweden) Elias Ymer	6	1	6
(Italy) Roberto Marcora	3	6	2
(Germany) Peter Gojowczyk	6	4	2
(Spain) Roberto Carballés Baena	3	6	6
(Germany) Andreas Beck	4	6^{6}
26	(Netherlands) Thiemo de Bakker	6	7^{8}

Second round
4	(Slovenia) Blaž Rola	2	3
(Sweden) Elias Ymer	6	6
(Spain) Roberto Carballés Baena	6	7
26	(Netherlands) Thiemo de Bakker	4	5

Qualifying competition
(Sweden) Elias Ymer	6	7
(Spain) Roberto Carballés Baena	3	5

=== Fifth qualifier ===
First round
5	(Germany) Dustin Brown	3	7	5
(Japan) Taro Daniel	6	5	7
(France) Kenny de Schepper	3	3
(Hungary) Márton Fucsovics	6	6
(France) David Guez	6	5	7
(Croatia) Mate Delić	4	7	5
(Bosnia and Herzegovina) Aldin Šetkić	4	6	3
32	(Poland) Michał Przysiężny	6	4	6

Second round
(Japan) Taro Daniel	6	6
(Hungary) Márton Fucsovics	3	1
(France) David Guez	6	7
32	(Poland) Michał Przysiężny	2	5

Qualifying competition
(Japan) Taro Daniel	7	2	6
(France) David Guez	5	6	3

=== Sixth qualifier ===
First round
6	(Italy) Luca Vanni	6	6^{4}	16
(Romania) Adrian Ungur	4	7^{7}	14
(Italy) Thomas Fabbiano	6	6
WC	(France) Guillaume Rufin	4	2
(Italy) Matteo Viola	6	7
(Bosnia and Herzegovina) Mirza Bašić	2	5
(Japan) Hiroki Moriya	1	2
29	(Kazakhstan) Andrey Golubev	6	6

Second round
6	(Italy) Luca Vanni	3	6	6
(Italy) Thomas Fabbiano	6	3	2
(Italy) Matteo Viola	4	4
29	(Kazakhstan) Andrey Golubev	6	6

Qualifying competition
6	(Italy) Luca Vanni	6	3	6
29	(Kazakhstan) Andrey Golubev	4	6	3

=== Seventh qualifier ===
First round
7	(Slovakia) Norbert Gombos	6	7^{8}
(Chile) Hans Podlipnik Castillo	3	6^{6}
(Japan) Yoshihito Nishioka	6	6
(Czech Republic) Jan Mertl	4	3
(Brazil) Guilherme Clezar	7^{7}	6
(Australia) Benjamin Mitchell	6^{4}	4
(Australia) Luke Saville	3	7^{7}	6
23	(Uzbekistan) Farrukh Dustov	6	6^{5}	4

Second round
7	(Slovakia) Norbert Gombos	6	2	6
(Japan) Yoshihito Nishioka	2	6	8
(Brazil) Guilherme Clezar	6	6
(Australia) Luke Saville	4	1

Qualifying competition
(Japan) Yoshihito Nishioka	6	6
(Brazil) Guilherme Clezar	2	1

=== Eighth qualifier ===
First round
8	(United Kingdom) James Ward	6	1	6
(Republic of Ireland) James McGee	1	6	0
(Russia) Aslan Karatsev	6^{5}	6	5
(Sweden) Christian Lindell	7^{7}	4	7
(United States) Chase Buchanan	2	5
(Czech Republic) Jan Hernych	6	7
(Chile) Christian Garín	2	6^{2}
28	(Spain) Daniel Muñoz de la Nava	6	7^{7}

Second round
8	(United Kingdom) James Ward	6	6^{5}	2
(Sweden) Christian Lindell	3	7^{7}	6
(Czech Republic) Jan Hernych	3	7^{7}	6
28	(Spain) Daniel Muñoz de la Nava	6	6^{4}	3

Qualifying competition
(Sweden) Christian Lindell	3	6	6
(Czech Republic) Jan Hernych	6	4	4

=== Ninth qualifier ===
First round
9	(Colombia) Alejandro González	6	3	4
PR	(France) Stéphane Robert	4	6	6
(Canada) Frank Dancevic	3	6	2
(France) Tristan Lamasine	6	4	6
(Brazil) André Ghem	7	6
(Croatia) Antonio Veić	5	1
(United States) Jarmere Jenkins	3	0
22	(Spain) Albert Montañés	6	6

Second round
PR	(France) Stéphane Robert	6	3	6
(France) Tristan Lamasine	1	6	3
(Brazil) André Ghem	6	7
22	(Spain) Albert Montañés	1	5

Qualifying competition
PR	(France) Stéphane Robert	6	6^{4}	8
(Brazil) André Ghem	2	7^{7}	6

=== Tenth qualifier ===
First round
10	(Belgium) Kimmer Coppejans	3	6	6
WC	(France) Constant Lestienne	6	2	2
PR	(Croatia) Ante Pavić	2	4
(France) Vincent Millot	6	6
WC	(France) Johan Tatlot	1	6	2
WC	(France) Calvin Hemery	6	3	6
(United Kingdom) Liam Broady	7^{7}	6^{2}	2
24	(Moldova) Radu Albot	6^{5}	7^{7}	6

Second round
10	(Belgium) Kimmer Coppejans	7	6
(France) Vincent Millot	5	1
WC	(France) Calvin Hemery	2	7^{10}	6
24	(Moldova) Radu Albot	6	6^{8}	4

Qualifying competition
10	(Belgium) Kimmer Coppejans	7	2	6
WC	(France) Calvin Hemery	5	6	2

=== Eleventh qualifier ===
First round
11	(Colombia) Alejandro Falla	6	3	7
(Morocco) Lamine Ouahab	3	6	5
(Belgium) Niels Desein	4	1
(Belgium) Maxime Authom	6	6
(Portugal) Rui Machado	6^{3}	2
(Belgium) Germain Gigounon	7^{7}	6
WC	(France) Grégoire Barrère	6	3	2
20	(Russia) Alexander Kudryavtsev	3	6	6

Second round
11	(Colombia) Alejandro Falla	3	6	6
(Belgium) Maxime Authom	6	1	4
(Belgium) Germain Gigounon	4	6	6
20	(Russia) Alexander Kudryavtsev	6	4	1

Qualifying competition
11	(Colombia) Alejandro Falla	2	2
(Belgium) Germain Gigounon	6	6

=== Twelfth qualifier ===
First round
12	(Spain) Adrián Menéndez-Maceiras	7	6
(Chile) Nicolás Jarry	5	4
WC	(France) Jules Marie	7	3	4
(Spain) Jordi Samper-Montaña	5	6	6
(Romania) Victor Hănescu	6	4	6
(Italy) Potito Starace	4	6	4
(Austria) Gerald Melzer	6	2	4
17	(United Kingdom) Kyle Edmund	3	6	6

Second round
12	(Spain) Adrián Menéndez-Maceiras	6	3	6
(Spain) Jordi Samper-Montaña	1	6	3
(Romania) Victor Hănescu	1	2
17	(United Kingdom) Kyle Edmund	6	6

Qualifying competition
12	(Spain) Adrián Menéndez-Maceiras	1	4
17	(United Kingdom) Kyle Edmund	6	6

=== Thirteenth qualifier ===
First round
13	(Argentina) Guido Pella	6	6
(Czech Republic) Jaroslav Pospíšil	1	1
(Belgium) Arthur De Greef	4	2
(Portugal) Gastão Elias	6	6
(France) Mathias Bourgue	6	2	7
(United Kingdom) Brydan Klein	3	6	9
(United States) Dennis Novikov	6	3	2
31	(Argentina) Facundo Argüello	4	6	6

Second round
13	(Argentina) Guido Pella	5	7	5
(Portugal) Gastão Elias	7	5	7
(United Kingdom) Brydan Klein	3	1
31	(Argentina) Facundo Argüello	6	6

Qualifying competition
(Portugal) Gastão Elias	7	7^{7}
31	(Argentina) Facundo Argüello	5	6^{4}

=== Fourteenth qualifier ===
First round
14	(Kazakhstan) Aleksandr Nedovyesov	3	6	7
(India) Yuki Bhambri	6	3	9
(Australia) Jason Kubler	3	6^{5}
(Germany) Tim Pütz	6	7^{7}
(Japan) Yūichi Sugita	4	1
(Estonia) Jürgen Zopp	6	6
(Russia) Konstantin Kravchuk	3	6^{3}
19	(Germany) Matthias Bachinger	6	7^{7}

Second round
(India) Yuki Bhambri	4	3
(Germany) Tim Pütz	6	6
(Estonia) Jürgen Zopp	2	4
19	(Germany) Matthias Bachinger	6	6

Qualifying competition
(Germany) Tim Pütz	3	0
19	(Germany) Matthias Bachinger	6	6

=== Fifteenth qualifier ===
First round
Alt	(Argentina) Juan Ignacio Londero	1	3
(Russia) Evgeny Donskoy	6	6
(France) Enzo Couacaud	2	6	5
(India) Somdev Devvarman	6	4	7
(Spain) Pere Riba	3	6	5
(Ukraine) Denys Molchanov	6	0	7
PR	(Israel) Amir Weintraub	6^{2}	2
21	(Ukraine) Illya Marchenko	7^{7}	6

Second round
(Russia) Evgeny Donskoy	6	6
(India) Somdev Devvarman	2	4
(Ukraine) Denys Molchanov	6^{7}	3
21	(Ukraine) Illya Marchenko	7^{9}	6

Qualifying competition
(Russia) Evgeny Donskoy	7^{7}	5	4
21	(Ukraine) Illya Marchenko	6^{4}	7	6

=== Sixteenth qualifier ===
First round
16	(United States) Austin Krajicek	6^{3}	1
(Italy) Filippo Volandri	7^{7}	6
(Germany) Michael Berrer	6	6
WC	(France) Corentin Moutet	2	2
(United States) Jason Jung	6^{2}	6	7
(Slovakia) Andrej Martin	7^{7}	3	5
(Australia) Jordan Thompson	5	2
18	(Italy) Marco Cecchinato	7	6

Second round
(Italy) Filippo Volandri	4	5
(Germany) Michael Berrer	6	7
(United States) Jason Jung	5	1
18	(Italy) Marco Cecchinato	7	6

Qualifying competition
(Germany) Michael Berrer	6	6
18	(Italy) Marco Cecchinato	4	2
