= 2015 French Open – Day-by-day summaries =

The 2015 French Open described below in detail, in the form of day-by-day summaries.

== Day 1 (24 May) ==
- Schedule of play
- Seeds out:
  - Men's Singles: (Croatia) Ivo Karlović [25], (Spain) Guillermo García-López [26]
  - Women's Singles: (China) Peng Shuai [24], (France) Caroline Garcia [31]

Matches on main courts
Matches on Court Philippe Chatrier (Center Court)
| Event | Winner | Loser | Score |
|---|---|---|---|
| Women's Singles 1st round | (Romania) Simona Halep [3] | (Russia) Evgeniya Rodina | 7–5, 6–4 |
| Men's Singles 1st round | (Switzerland) Roger Federer [2] | (Colombia) Alejandro Falla [LL] | 6–3, 6–3, 6–4 |
| Women's Singles 1st round | (Croatia) Donna Vekić | (France) Caroline Garcia [31] | 3–6, 6–3, 6–2 |
| Men's Singles 1st round | (France) Jo-Wilfried Tsonga [14] | (Sweden) Christian Lindell [Q] | 6–1, 6–2, 6–2 |
Matches on Court Suzanne Lenglen (Grandstand)
| Event | Winner | Loser | Score |
| Women's Singles 1st round | (Russia) Ekaterina Makarova [9] | (United States) Louisa Chirico [WC] | 6–4, 6–2 |
| Men's Singles 1st round | (Switzerland) Stan Wawrinka [8] | (Turkey) Marsel İlhan | 6–3, 6–2, 6–3 |
| Men's Singles 1st round | (Japan) Kei Nishikori [5] | (France) Paul-Henri Mathieu [WC] | 6–3, 7–5, 6–1 |
| Women's Singles 1st round | (Serbia) Ana Ivanovic [7] | (Kazakhstan) Yaroslava Shvedova | 4–6, 6–2, 6–0 |
Matches on Court 1
| Event | Winner | Loser | Score |
| Men's Singles 1st round | (Spain) Roberto Bautista Agut [19] | (Germany) Florian Mayer [PR] | 6–3, 6–1, 6–3 |
| Women's Singles 1st round | (Spain) Garbiñe Muguruza [21] | (Croatia) Petra Martić [Q] | 6–2, 7–5 |
| Men's Singles 1st round | (Latvia) Ernests Gulbis [24] | (Netherlands) Igor Sijsling [Q] | 6–4, 6–4, 7–6^{(7–3)} |
| Women's Singles 1st round | (Japan) Kurumi Nara | (France) Océane Dodin [WC] | 3–6, 7–5, 6–1 |

== Day 2 (25 May) ==
- Schedule of play
- Seeds out:
  - Men's Singles: (Spain) Feliciano López [11], (France) Adrian Mannarino [30]
  - Women's Singles: (Poland) Agnieszka Radwańska [14], (United States) Venus Williams [15], (Czech Republic) Barbora Strýcová [22]

Matches on main courts
Matches on Court Philippe Chatrier (Center Court)
| Event | Winner | Loser | Score |
|---|---|---|---|
| Women's Singles 1st Round | (France) Alizé Cornet [29] | (Italy) Roberta Vinci | 4–6, 6–4, 6–1 |
| Men's Singles 1st Round | (France) Gilles Simon [12] | (France) Lucas Pouille [WC] | 3–6, 6–1, 6–2, 6–4 |
| Women's Singles 1st Round | (Russia) Maria Sharapova [2] | (Estonia) Kaia Kanepi | 6–2, 6–4 |
| Men's Singles 1st Round | (United Kingdom) Andy Murray [3] | (Argentina) Facundo Argüello [LL] | 6–3, 6–3, 6–1 |
Matches on Court Suzanne Lenglen (Grandstand)
| Event | Winner | Loser | Score |
| Men's Singles 1st Round | (Czech Republic) Tomáš Berdych [4] | (Japan) Yoshihito Nishioka [Q] | 6–0, 7–5, 6–3 |
| Women's Singles 1st Round | (France) Virginie Razzano [WC] | (Paraguay) Verónica Cepede Royg [Q] | 2–6, 6–4, 6–2 |
| Men's Singles 1st Round | (France) Gaël Monfils [13] | (France) Édouard Roger-Vasselin [WC] | 6–2, 5–7^{(5–7)}, 6–1, 7–5 |
| Women's Singles 1st Round | (United States) Sloane Stephens | (United States) Venus Williams [15] | 7–6^{(7–5)}, 6–1 |
Matches on Court 1
| Event | Winner | Loser | Score |
| Women's Singles 1st Round | (Spain) Carla Suárez Navarro [8] | (Romania) Monica Niculescu | 6–2, 6–2 |
| Men's Singles 1st Round | (France) Benoît Paire | (Portugal) Gastão Elias [Q] | 5–7, 6–3, 4–6, 6–4, 6–2 |
| Women's Singles 1st Round | (Belarus) Victoria Azarenka [27] | (Spain) María Teresa Torró Flor | 6–2, 6–1 |
| Men's Singles 1st Round | (Austria) Jürgen Melzer | (France) Adrian Mannarino [30] | 7–6^{(7–5)}, 6–3, 7–6^{(7–4)} |

== Day 3 (26 May) ==
- Schedule of play
- Seeds out:
  - Men's Singles: (Bulgaria) Grigor Dimitrov [10]
  - Women's Singles: (Canada) Eugenie Bouchard [6], (Serbia) Jelena Janković [25]
  - Men's Doubles: (Spain) Marcel Granollers / (Spain) Marc López [4]

Matches on main courts
Matches on Court Philippe Chatrier (Center Court)
| Event | Winner | Loser | Score |
|---|---|---|---|
| Women's Singles 1st Round | (Czech Republic) Petra Kvitová [4] | (New Zealand) Marina Erakovic | 6–4, 3–6, 6–4 |
| Men's Singles 1st Round | (Spain) Rafael Nadal [6] | (France) Quentin Halys [WC] | 6–3, 6–3, 6–4 |
| Men's Singles 1st Round | (Serbia) Novak Djokovic [1] | (Finland) Jarkko Nieminen | 6–2, 7–5, 6–2 |
| Women's Singles 1st Round | (United States) Serena Williams [1] | (Czech Republic) Andrea Hlaváčková [Q] | 6–2, 6–3 |
Matches on Court Suzanne Lenglen (Grandstand)
| Event | Winner | Loser | Score |
| Men's Singles 1st Round | (Spain) David Ferrer [7] | (Slovakia) Lukáš Lacko | 6–1, 6–3, 6–1 |
| Women's Singles 1st Round | (Denmark) Caroline Wozniacki [5] | (Italy) Karin Knapp | 6–3, 6–0 |
| Men's Singles 1st Round | (France) Richard Gasquet [20] | (Belgium) Germain Gigounon [Q] | 6–4, 6–3, 6–0 |
| Women's Singles 1st Round | (France) Kristina Mladenovic | (Canada) Eugenie Bouchard [6] | 6–4, 6–4 |
Matches on Court 1
| Event | Winner | Loser | Score |
| Women's Singles 1st Round | (Russia) Svetlana Kuznetsova [18] | (Netherlands) Kiki Bertens | 6–1, 4–6, 6–2 |
| Men's Singles 1st Round | (France) Jérémy Chardy | (Germany) Michael Berrer [Q] | 4–6, 6–3, 6–4, 6–4 |
| Women's Singles 1st Round | (Germany) Andrea Petkovic [10] | (United States) Shelby Rogers | 6–2, 6–1 |
| Men's Singles 1st Round | (United States) Jack Sock | (Bulgaria) Grigor Dimitrov [10] | 7–6^{(9–7)}, 6–2, 6–3 |

== Day 4 (27 May) ==
- Schedule of play
- Seeds out:
  - Men's Singles: (Spain) Roberto Bautista Agut [19], (Latvia) Ernests Gulbis [24], (Italy) Fabio Fognini [28], (Spain) Fernando Verdasco [32]
  - Women's Singles: (Romania) Simona Halep [3]
  - Men's Doubles: (Colombia) Juan Sebastián Cabal / (Colombia) Robert Farah [16]

Matches on main courts
Matches on Court Philippe Chatrier (Center Court)
| Event | Winner | Loser | Score |
|---|---|---|---|
| Women's Singles 2nd Round | (Russia) Maria Sharapova [2] | (Russia) Vitalia Diatchenko | 6–3, 6–1 |
| Men's Singles 2nd Round | (Japan) Kei Nishikori [5] | (Brazil) Thomaz Bellucci | 7–5, 6–4, 6–4 |
| Men's Singles 2nd Round | (France) Gaël Monfils [13] | (Argentina) Diego Schwartzman | 4–6, 6–4, 4–6, 6–2, 6–3 |
| Women's Singles 2nd Round | (Spain) Carla Suárez Navarro [8] | (France) Virginie Razzano [WC] | 6–3, 1–0, ret. |
Matches on Court Suzanne Lenglen (Grandstand)
| Event | Winner | Loser | Score |
| Women's Singles 2nd Round | (Australia) Samantha Stosur [26] | (France) Amandine Hesse [WC] | 6–0, 6–1 |
| Men's Singles 2nd Round | (Switzerland) Roger Federer [2] | (Spain) Marcel Granollers | 6–2, 7–6^{(7–1)}, 6–3 |
| Women's Singles 2nd Round | (Croatia) Mirjana Lučić-Baroni | (Romania) Simona Halep [3] | 7–5, 6–1 |
| Men's Singles 2nd Round | (France) Jo-Wilfried Tsonga [14] | (Israel) Dudi Sela | 6–4, 6–1, 6–1 |
Matches on Court 1
| Event | Winner | Loser | Score |
| Men's Singles 2nd Round | (France) Gilles Simon [12] | (Slovakia) Martin Kližan | 7–5, 6–2, 6–3 |
| Women's Singles 2nd Round | (France) Alizé Cornet [29] | (Romania) Alexandra Dulgheru | 6–2, 7–5 |
| Men's Singles 2nd Round | (Czech Republic) Tomáš Berdych [4] | (Czech Republic) Radek Štěpánek [PR] | 6–3, 6–7^{(7–9)}, 6–3, 6–3 |

== Day 5 (28 May) ==
- Schedule of play
- Seeds out:
  - Men's Singles: (United States) John Isner [16], (Spain) Tommy Robredo [18], (Germany) Philipp Kohlschreiber [22], (Australia) Bernard Tomic [27], (Serbia) Viktor Troicki [31]
  - Women's Singles: (Denmark) Caroline Wozniacki [5], (Czech Republic) Karolína Plíšková [12], (Russia) Svetlana Kuznetsova [18], (Kazakhstan) Zarina Diyas [32]
  - Women's Doubles: (Spain) Garbiñe Muguruza / (Spain) Carla Suárez Navarro [5], (United States) Raquel Kops-Jones / (United States) Abigail Spears [6], (Poland) Klaudia Jans-Ignacik / (Slovenia) Andreja Klepač [16]
  - Mixed Doubles: (India) Sania Mirza / (Brazil) Bruno Soares [1], (Russia) Elena Vesnina / (Serbia) Nenad Zimonjić [3], (Czech Republic) Andrea Hlaváčková / (Spain) Marc López [4]

Matches on main courts
Matches on Court Philippe Chatrier (Center Court)
| Event | Winner | Loser | Score |
|---|---|---|---|
| Women's Singles 2nd Round | (Germany) Julia Görges | (Denmark) Caroline Wozniacki [5] | 6–4, 7–6^{(7–4)} |
| Men's Singles 2nd Round | (Spain) Rafael Nadal [6] | (Spain) Nicolás Almagro | 6–4, 6–3, 6–1 |
| Men's Singles 2nd Round | (United Kingdom) Andy Murray [3] | (Portugal) João Sousa | 6–2, 4–6, 6–4, 6–1 |
| Women's Singles 2nd Round | (France) Kristina Mladenovic | (Montenegro) Danka Kovinić | 6–3, 7–5 |
Matches on Court Suzanne Lenglen (Grandstand)
| Event | Winner | Loser | Score |
| Women's Singles 2nd Round | (Czech Republic) Petra Kvitová [4] | (Spain) Sílvia Soler Espinosa | 6–7^{(4–7)}, 6–4, 6–2 |
| Women's Singles 2nd Round | (United States) Serena Williams [1] | (Germany) Anna-Lena Friedsam | 5–7, 6–3, 6–3 |
| Men's Singles 2nd Round | (Serbia) Novak Djokovic [1] | (Luxembourg) Gilles Müller | 6–1, 6–4, 6–4 |
Matches on Court 1
| Event | Winner | Loser | Score |
| Women's Singles 2nd Round | (Italy) Francesca Schiavone | (Russia) Svetlana Kuznetsova [18] | 6–7^{(11–13)}, 7–5, 10–8 |
| Women's Singles 2nd Round | (Belarus) Victoria Azarenka [27] | (Czech Republic) Lucie Hradecká | 6–2, 6–3 |
| Men's Singles 2nd Round | (France) Jérémy Chardy | (United States) John Isner [16] | 6–4, 4–6, 6–3, 6–3 |
| Women's Singles 2nd Round | (Belgium) Alison Van Uytvanck | (Kazakhstan) Zarina Diyas [32] | 0–6, 6–1, 6–4 |

== Day 6 (29 May) ==
- Schedule of play
- Seeds out:
  - Men's Singles: (Uruguay) Pablo Cuevas [21]
  - Women's Singles: (Spain) Carla Suárez Navarro [8], (Germany) Angelique Kerber [11], (Germany) Sabine Lisicki [20], (Australia) Samantha Stosur [26]
  - Men's Doubles: (Croatia) Marin Draganja / (Finland) Henri Kontinen [13]
  - Women's Doubles: (Russia) Alla Kudryavtseva / (Russia) Anastasia Pavlyuchenkova [10]
  - Mixed Doubles: (France) Caroline Garcia / (United States) Bob Bryan [5]

Matches on main courts
Matches on Court Philippe Chatrier (Center Court)
| Event | Winner | Loser | Score |
|---|---|---|---|
| Women's Singles 3rd Round | (France) Alizé Cornet [29] | (Croatia) Mirjana Lučić-Baroni | 4–6, 6–3, 7–5 |
| Men's Singles 3rd Round | (Switzerland) Roger Federer [2] | (Bosnia and Herzegovina) Damir Džumhur | 6–4, 6–3, 6–2 |
| Women's Singles 3rd Round | (Russia) Maria Sharapova [2] | (Australia) Samantha Stosur [26] | 6–3, 6–4 |
| Men's Singles 3rd Round | (France) Jo-Wilfried Tsonga [14] | (Spain) Pablo Andújar | 7–6^{(7–3)}, 6–4, 6–3 |
Matches on Court Suzanne Lenglen (Grandstand)
| Event | Winner | Loser | Score |
| Women's Singles 3rd Round | (Serbia) Ana Ivanovic [7] | (Croatia) Donna Vekić | 6–0, 6–3 |
| Men's Singles 2nd Round | (France) Richard Gasquet [20] | (Argentina) Carlos Berlocq | 3–6, 6–3, 6–1, 4–6, 6–1 |
| Men's Singles 3rd Round | (France) Gilles Simon [12] | (France) Nicolas Mahut [WC] | 6–2, 6–7^{(6–8)}, 6–7^{(6–8)}, 6–3, 6–1 |
| Men's Singles 3rd Round | (France) Gaël Monfils [13] | (Uruguay) Pablo Cuevas [21] | 4–6, 7–6^{(7–1)}, 3–6, 6–4, 6–3 |
Matches on Court 1
| Event | Winner | Loser | Score |
| Men's Doubles 2nd Round | (United States) Bob Bryan [1] (United States) Mike Bryan [1] | (Australia) Thanasi Kokkinakis [WC] (France) Lucas Pouille [WC] | 7–6^{(7–4)}, 7–6^{(7–3)} |
| Women's Singles 3rd Round | (Czech Republic) Lucie Šafářová [13] | (Germany) Sabine Lisicki [20] | 6–3, 7–6^{(7–2)} |
| Men's Singles 3rd Round | (Switzerland) Stan Wawrinka [8] | (United States) Steve Johnson | 6–4, 6–3, 6–2 |
| Men's Singles 3rd Round | (Czech Republic) Tomáš Berdych [4] | (France) Benoît Paire | 6–1, 6–7^{(5–7)}, 6–3, 6–4 |

== Day 7 (30 May) ==
- Schedule of play
- Seeds out:
  - Men's Singles: (South Africa) Kevin Anderson [15], (Belgium) David Goffin [17], (Argentina) Leonardo Mayer [23], (Australia) Nick Kyrgios [29]
  - Women's Singles: (Germany) Andrea Petkovic [10], (United States) Madison Keys [16], (Belarus) Victoria Azarenka [27], (Romania) Irina-Camelia Begu [30]
  - Men's Doubles: (Uruguay) Pablo Cuevas / (Spain) David Marrero [12], (Spain) Guillermo García-López / (France) Édouard Roger-Vasselin [15]
  - Women's Doubles: (Hungary) Tímea Babos / (France) Kristina Mladenovic [3]
  - Mixed Doubles: (Switzerland) Martina Hingis / (India) Leander Paes [8]

Matches on main courts
Matches on Court Philippe Chatrier (Center Court)
| Event | Winner | Loser | Score |
|---|---|---|---|
| Women's Singles 3rd Round | (Czech Republic) Petra Kvitová [4] | (Romania) Irina-Camelia Begu [30] | 6–3, 6–2 |
| Men's Singles 3rd Round | (Serbia) Novak Djokovic [1] | (Australia) Thanasi Kokkinakis [WC] | 6–4, 6–4, 6–4 |
| Men's Singles 3rd Round | (France) Richard Gasquet [20] | (South Africa) Kevin Anderson [15] | 4–6, 7–6^{(7–4)}, 7–5, 6–4 |
| Women's Singles 3rd Round | (United States) Serena Williams [1] | (Belarus) Victoria Azarenka [27] | 3–6, 6–4, 6–2 |
Matches on Court Suzanne Lenglen (Grandstand)
| Event | Winner | Loser | Score |
| Men's Singles 3rd Round | (United Kingdom) Andy Murray [3] | (Australia) Nick Kyrgios [29] | 6–4, 6–2, 6–3 |
| Women's Singles 3rd Round | (Belgium) Alison Van Uytvanck | (France) Kristina Mladenovic | 6–4, 6–1 |
| Men's Singles 3rd Round | (Spain) Rafael Nadal [6] | (Russia) Andrey Kuznetsov | 6–1, 6–3, 6–2 |
| Women's Singles 3rd Round | (United States) Sloane Stephens | (Bulgaria) Tsvetana Pironkova | 6–4, 6–1 |
Matches on Court 1
| Event | Winner | Loser | Score |
| Women's Singles 3rd Round | (Italy) Sara Errani [17] | (Germany) Andrea Petkovic [10] | 6–3, 6–3 |
| Men's Singles 3rd Round | (France) Jérémy Chardy | (Belgium) David Goffin [17] | 6–3, 6–4, 6–2 |
| Men's Singles 3rd Round | (Spain) David Ferrer [7] | (Italy) Simone Bolelli | 6–3, 1–6, 5–7, 6–0, 6–1 |
| Mixed Doubles 2nd Round | (Slovenia) Katarina Srebotnik (Romania) Horia Tecău | (Switzerland) Martina Hingis [8] (India) Leander Paes [8] | 6–7^{(6–8)}, 6–3, [10–6] |

== Day 8 (31 May) ==
- Schedule of play
- Seeds out:
  - Men's Singles: (Czech Republic) Tomáš Berdych [4], (France) Gilles Simon [12]
  - Women's Singles: (Russia) Ekaterina Makarova [9], (France) Alizé Cornet [29]
  - Men's Doubles: (India) Rohan Bopanna / (Romania) Florin Mergea [9], (Canada) Daniel Nestor / (India) Leander Paes [10], (United Kingdom) Jamie Murray / (Australia) John Peers [11], (France) Pierre-Hugues Herbert / (France) Nicolas Mahut [14]
  - Women's Doubles: (France) Caroline Garcia / (Slovenia) Katarina Srebotnik [8], (Chinese Taipei) Chan Yung-jan / (China) Zheng Jie [11], (Italy) Karin Knapp / (Italy) Roberta Vinci [14]
  - Mixed Doubles: (France) Kristina Mladenovic / (Canada) Daniel Nestor [6]

Matches on main courts
Matches on Court Philippe Chatrier (Center Court)
| Event | Winner | Loser | Score |
|---|---|---|---|
| Women's Singles 4th Round | (Ukraine) Elina Svitolina [19] | (France) Alizé Cornet [29] | 6–2, 7–6^{(11–9)} |
| Men's Singles 4th Round | (France) Jo-Wilfried Tsonga [14] | (Czech Republic) Tomáš Berdych [4] | 6–3, 6–2, 6–7^{(5–7)}, 6–3 |
| Men's Singles 4th Round | (France) Gaël Monfils [13] vs. (Switzerland) Roger Federer [2] | | 3–6, 6–4, suspended |
| Women's Singles 4th Round | (Italy) Flavia Pennetta [28] vs. (Spain) Garbiñe Muguruza [21] | | Cancelled |
Matches on Court Suzanne Lenglen (Grandstand)
| Event | Winner | Loser | Score |
| Women's Singles 4th Round | (Serbia) Ana Ivanovic [7] | (Russia) Ekaterina Makarova [9] | 7–5, 3–6, 6–1 |
| Men's Singles 4th Round | (Japan) Kei Nishikori [5] | (Russia) Teymuraz Gabashvili | 6–3, 6–4, 6–2 |
| Men's Singles 4th Round | (Switzerland) Stan Wawrinka [8] | (France) Gilles Simon [12] | 6–1, 6–4, 6–2 |
| Women's Singles 4th Round | (Czech Republic) Lucie Šafářová [13] vs. (Russia) Maria Sharapova [2] | | Cancelled |
Matches on Court 1
| Event | Winner | Loser | Score |
| Men's Doubles 3rd Round | (United States) Bob Bryan [1] (United States) Mike Bryan [1] | (France) Jérémy Chardy (Poland) Łukasz Kubot | 6–4, 7–5 |
| Men's Doubles 3rd Round | (Canada) Vasek Pospisil [2] (United States) Jack Sock [2] | (France) Pierre-Hugues Herbert [14] (France) Nicolas Mahut [14] | 7–6^{(7–3)}, 7–6^{(7–2)} |
| Women's Doubles 3rd Round | (Switzerland) Martina Hingis [1] (India) Sania Mirza [1] | (Italy) Karin Knapp [14] (Italy) Roberta Vinci [14] | 6–1, 6–4 |
| Mixed Doubles 2nd Round | (Australia) Anastasia Rodionova (Pakistan) Aisam-ul-Haq Qureshi | (France) Kristina Mladenovic [6] (Canada) Daniel Nestor [6] | 6–4, 6–3 |

== Day 9 (1 June) ==
- Schedule of play
- Seeds out:
  - Men's Singles: (Croatia) Marin Čilić [9], (France) Gaël Monfils [13], (France) Richard Gasquet [20]
  - Women's Singles: (Russia) Maria Sharapova [2], (Czech Republic) Petra Kvitová [4], (Italy) Flavia Pennetta [28]
  - Men's Doubles: (Austria) Alexander Peya / (Brazil) Bruno Soares [8]
  - Women's Doubles: (Australia) Anastasia Rodionova / (Australia) Arina Rodionova [15]

Matches on main courts
Matches on Court Philippe Chatrier (Center Court)
| Event | Winner | Loser | Score |
|---|---|---|---|
| Women's Singles 4th Round | (Czech Republic) Lucie Šafářová [13] | (Russia) Maria Sharapova [2] | 7–6^{(7–3)}, 6–4 |
| Men's Singles 4th Round | (Switzerland) Roger Federer [2] | (France) Gaël Monfils [13] | 6–3, 4–6, 6–4, 6–1 |
| Women's Singles 4th Round | (United States) Serena Williams [1] | (United States) Sloane Stephens | 1–6, 7–5, 6–3 |
| Men's Singles 4th Round | (Serbia) Novak Djokovic [1] | (France) Richard Gasquet [20] | 6–1, 6–2, 6–3 |
Matches on Court Suzanne Lenglen (Grandstand)
| Event | Winner | Loser | Score |
| Women's Singles 4th Round | (Spain) Garbiñe Muguruza [21] | (Italy) Flavia Pennetta [28] | 6–3, 6–4 |
| Men's Singles 4th Round | (United Kingdom) Andy Murray [3] | (France) Jérémy Chardy | 6–4, 3–6, 6–3, 6–2 |
| Men's Singles 4th Round | (Spain) Rafael Nadal [6] | (United States) Jack Sock | 6–3, 6–1, 5–7, 6–2 |
| Women's Singles 4th Round | (Switzerland) Timea Bacsinszky [23] | (Czech Republic) Petra Kvitová [4] | 2–6, 6–0, 6–3 |
Matches on Court 1
| Event | Winner | Loser | Score |
| Men's Singles 4th Round | (Spain) David Ferrer [7] | (Croatia) Marin Čilić [9] | 6–2, 6–2, 6–4 |
| Women's Singles 4th Round | (Italy) Sara Errani [17] | (Germany) Julia Görges | 6–2, 6–2 |
| Women's Singles 4th Round | (Belgium) Alison Van Uytvanck | (Romania) Andreea Mitu | 6–1, 6–3 |

== Day 10 (2 June) ==
- Schedule of play
- Seeds out:
  - Men's Singles: (Switzerland) Roger Federer [2], (Japan) Kei Nishikori [5]
  - Women's Singles: (Ukraine) Elina Svitolina [19], (Spain) Garbiñe Muguruza [21]
  - Men's Doubles: (Canada) Vasek Pospisil / (United States) Jack Sock [2], (Poland) Marcin Matkowski / (Serbia) Nenad Zimonjić [7]
  - Women's Doubles: (Netherlands) Michaëlla Krajicek / (Czech Republic) Barbora Strýcová [13]
  - Mixed Doubles: (Hungary) Tímea Babos / (Austria) Alexander Peya [7]

Matches on main courts
Matches on Court Philippe Chatrier (Center Court)
| Event | Winner | Loser | Score |
|---|---|---|---|
| Women's Singles Quarterfinals | (Serbia) Ana Ivanovic [7] | (Ukraine) Elina Svitolina [19] | 6–3, 6–2 |
| Men's Singles Quarterfinals | (France) Jo-Wilfried Tsonga [14] | (Japan) Kei Nishikori [5] | 6–1, 6–4, 4–6, 3–6, 6–3 |
Matches on Court Suzanne Lenglen (Grandstand)
| Event | Winner | Loser | Score |
| Women's Singles Quarterfinals | (Czech Republic) Lucie Šafářová [13] | (Spain) Garbiñe Muguruza [21] | 7–6^{(7–3)}, 6–3 |
| Men's Singles Quarterfinals | (Switzerland) Stan Wawrinka [8] | (Switzerland) Roger Federer [2] | 6–4, 6–3, 7–6^{(7–4)} |
Matches on Court 1
| Event | Winner | Loser | Score |
| Women's Doubles Quarterfinals | (Australia) Casey Dellacqua [12] (Kazakhstan) Yaroslava Shvedova [12] | (Netherlands) Michaëlla Krajicek [13] (Czech Republic) Barbora Strýcová [13] | 6–3, 7–5 |
| Men's Doubles Quarterfinals | (United States) Bob Bryan [1] (United States) Mike Bryan [1] | (Poland) Marcin Matkowski [7] (Serbia) Nenad Zimonjic [7] | 6–4, 6–7^{(5–7)}, 6–4 |
| Men's Doubles Quarterfinals | (Netherlands) Jean-Julien Rojer [5] (Romania) Horia Tecau [5] | (Canada) Vasek Pospisil [2] (United States) Jack Sock [2] | 6–3, 6–3 |
| Mixed Doubles Quarterfinals | (United States) Bethanie Mattek-Sands [2] (United States) Mike Bryan [2] | (Australia) Anastasia Rodionova (Pakistan) Aisam-ul-Haq Qureshi | 6–0, 7–6^{(7–3)} |

== Day 11 (3 June) ==
- Schedule of play
- Seeds out:
  - Men's Singles: (Spain) Rafael Nadal [6], (Spain) David Ferrer [7]
  - Women's Singles: (Italy) Sara Errani [17]
  - Women's Doubles: (Switzerland) Martina Hingis / (India) Sania Mirza [1], (Chinese Taipei) Hsieh Su-wei / (Italy) Flavia Pennetta [4]

Matches on main courts
Matches on Court Philippe Chatrier (Center Court)
| Event | Winner | Loser | Score |
|---|---|---|---|
| Women's Singles Quarterfinals | (United States) Serena Williams [1] | (Italy) Sara Errani [17] | 6–1, 6–3 |
| Men's Singles Quarterfinals | (Serbia) Novak Djokovic [1] | (Spain) Rafael Nadal [6] | 7–5, 6–3, 6–1 |
Matches on Court Suzanne Lenglen (Grandstand)
| Event | Winner | Loser | Score |
| Women's Singles Quarterfinals | (Switzerland) Timea Bacsinszky [23] | (Belgium) Alison Van Uytvanck | 6–4, 7–5 |
| Men's Singles Quarterfinals | (United Kingdom) Andy Murray [3] | (Spain) David Ferrer [7] | 7–6^{(7–4)}, 6–2, 5–7, 6–1 |
Matches on Court 1
| Men's Legends Over 45 Doubles | (United States) John McEnroe (United States) Patrick McEnroe | (Australia) Pat Cash (Ecuador) Andrés Gómez | 6–3, 6–4 |
| Women's Doubles Quarterfinals | (United States) Bethanie Mattek-Sands [7] (Czech Republic) Lucie Šafářová [7] | (Switzerland) Martina Hingis [1] (India) Sania Mirza [1] | 7–5, 6–2 |
| Women's Doubles Quarterfinals | (Czech Republic) Andrea Hlaváčková [9] (Czech Republic) Lucie Hradecká [9] | (Chinese Taipei) Hsieh Su-wei [4] (Italy) Flavia Pennetta [4] | 7–5, 3–6, 7–5 |
| Mixed Doubles Semifinals | (United States) Bethanie Mattek-Sands [2] (United States) Mike Bryan [2] | (Slovenia) Katarina Srebotnik (Romania) Horia Tecău | 4–6, 6–3, [10–8] |
| Mixed Doubles Semifinals | (Czech Republic) Lucie Hradecká (Poland) Marcin Matkowski | (China) Zheng Jie (Finland) Henri Kontinen | 7–5, 7–6^{(7–5)} |

== Day 12 (4 June) ==
- Schedule of play
- Seeds out:
  - Women's Singles: (Serbia) Ana Ivanovic [7], (Switzerland) Timea Bacsinszky [23]
  - Men's Doubles: (Netherlands) Jean-Julien Rojer / (Romania) Horia Tecău [5], (Italy) Simone Bolelli / (Italy) Fabio Fognini [6]

Matches on main courts
Matches on Court Philippe Chatrier (Center Court)
| Event | Winner | Loser | Score |
|---|---|---|---|
| Men's Doubles Semifinals | (United States) Bob Bryan [1] (United States) Mike Bryan [1] | (Italy) Simone Bolelli [6] (Italy) Fabio Fognini [6] | 6–3, 6–3 |
| Women's Singles Semifinals | (Czech Republic) Lucie Šafářová [13] | (Serbia) Ana Ivanovic [7] | 7–5, 7–5 |
| Women's Singles Semifinals | (United States) Serena Williams [1] | (Switzerland) Timea Bacsinszky [23] | 4–6, 6–3, 6–0 |
Matches on Court Suzanne Lenglen (Grandstand)
| Event | Winner | Loser | Score |
| Women's Legends Doubles | (Belgium) Kim Clijsters (United States) Martina Navratilova | (Spain) Conchita Martínez (Russia) Anastasia Myskina | 7–5, 6–3 |
| Men's Doubles Semifinals | (Croatia) Ivan Dodig [3] (Brazil) Marcelo Melo [3] | (Netherlands) Jean-Julien Rojer [5] (Romania) Horia Tecău [5] | 6–3, 7–5 |
| Men's Legends Under 45 Doubles | (Spain) Juan Carlos Ferrero (Spain) Carlos Moyá | (United States) Michael Chang (Croatia) Goran Ivanišević | 6–3, 6–3 |
| Mixed Doubles Final | (United States) Bethanie Mattek-Sands [2] (United States) Mike Bryan [2] | (Czech Republic) Lucie Hradecká (Poland) Marcin Matkowski | 7–6^{(7–3)}, 6–1 |
Matches on Court 1
| Women's Legends Doubles | (United States) Lindsay Davenport (United States) Mary Joe Fernández | (France) Marion Bartoli (Croatia) Iva Majoli | 6–3, 6–3 |
| Men's Legends Over 45 Doubles | (France) Guy Forget (France) Henri Leconte | (Sweden) Mikael Pernfors (Sweden) Mats Wilander | 6–2, 7–6^{(9–7)} |
| Men's Legends Under 45 Doubles | (France) Arnaud Clément (France) Nicolas Escudé | (Russia) Yevgeny Kafelnikov (Ukraine) Andrei Medvedev | 6–4, 7–5 |

== Day 13 (5 June) ==
- Schedule of play
- Seeds out:
  - Men's Singles: (France) Jo-Wilfried Tsonga [14]
  - Women's Doubles: (Russia) Ekaterina Makarova / (Russia) Elena Vesnina [2], (Czech Republic) Andrea Hlaváčková / (Czech Republic) Lucie Hradecká [9]

Matches on main courts
Matches on Court Philippe Chatrier (Center Court)
| Event | Winner | Loser | Score |
|---|---|---|---|
| Men's Singles Semifinals | (Switzerland) Stan Wawrinka [8] | (France) Jo-Wilfried Tsonga [14] | 6–3, 6–7^{(1–7)}, 7–6^{(7–3)}, 6–4 |
| Men's Singles Semifinals | (Serbia) Novak Djokovic [1] vs. (United Kingdom) Andy Murray [3] | | 6–3, 6–3, 5–7, 3–3, suspended |
Matches on Court Suzanne Lenglen (Grandstand)
| Event | Winner | Loser | Score |
| Men's Legends Over 45 Doubles | (France) Cédric Pioline (Australia) Mark Woodforde | (United States) John McEnroe (United States) Patrick McEnroe | 6–4, 6–1 |
| Women's Doubles Semifinals | (United States) Bethanie Mattek-Sands [7] (Czech Republic) Lucie Šafářová [7] | (Czech Republic) Andrea Hlaváčková [9] (Czech Republic) Lucie Hradecká [9] | 6–2, 5–7, 6–4 |
| Women's Doubles Semifinals | (Australia) Casey Dellacqua [12] (Kazakhstan) Yaroslava Shvedova [12] | (Russia) Ekaterina Makarova [2] (Russia) Elena Vesnina [2] | 6–3, 6–2 |
| Women's Legends Doubles | (Spain) Conchita Martínez (Russia) Anastasia Myskina | (France) Nathalie Tauziat (France) Sandrine Testud | 6–2, 4–6, [10–8] |
Matches on Court 1
| Men's Legends Under 45 Doubles | (Russia) Yevgeny Kafelnikov (Ukraine) Andriy Medvedev | (Spain) Sergi Bruguera (Argentina) Gastón Gaudio | 6–4, 6–4 |
| Women's Legends Doubles | (France) Marion Bartoli (Croatia) Iva Majoli | (Czech Republic) Jana Novotná (Spain) Arantxa Sánchez Vicario | 6–4, 6–2 |

== Day 14 (6 June) ==
- Schedule of play
- Seeds out:
  - Men's Singles: (United Kingdom) Andy Murray [3]
  - Women's Singles: (Czech Republic) Lucie Šafářová [13]
  - Men's Doubles: (United States) Bob Bryan / (United States) Mike Bryan [1]

Matches on main courts
Matches on Court Philippe Chatrier (Center Court)
| Event | Winner | Loser | Score |
|---|---|---|---|
| Men's Singles Semifinals | (Serbia) Novak Djokovic [1] | (United Kingdom) Andy Murray [3] | 6–3, 6–3, 5–7, 5–7, 6–1 |
| Women's Singles Final | (United States) Serena Williams [1] | (Czech Republic) Lucie Šafářová [13] | 6–3, 6–7^{(2–7)}, 6–2 |
| Men's Doubles Final | (Croatia) Ivan Dodig [3] (Brazil) Marcelo Melo [3] | (United States) Bob Bryan [1] (United States) Mike Bryan [1] | 6–7^{(5–7)}, 7–6^{(7–5)}, 7–5 |
Matches on Court Suzanne Lenglen (Grandstand)
| Event | Winner | Loser | Score |
| Women's Legends Doubles Final | (Belgium) Kim Clijsters (United States) Martina Navratilova | (United States) Lindsay Davenport (United States) Mary Joe Fernández | 2–6, 6–2, [11–9] |
| Men's Legends Over 45 Doubles | (France) Guy Forget (France) Henri Leconte | (France) Mansour Bahrami (Netherlands) Paul Haarhuis | 7–6^{(7–1)}, 6–4 |
Matches on Court 1
| Men's Legends Under 45 Doubles | (Spain) Juan Carlos Ferrero (Spain) Carlos Moyá | (France) Sébastien Grosjean (France) Fabrice Santoro | 4–6, 6–3 retired |

== Day 15 (7 June) ==
- Schedule of play
- Seeds out:
  - Men's Singles: (Serbia) Novak Djokovic [1]
  - Women's Doubles: (Australia) Casey Dellacqua / (Kazakhstan) Yaroslava Shvedova [12]

Matches on main courts
Matches on Court Philippe Chatrier (Center Court)
| Event | Winner | Loser | Score |
|---|---|---|---|
| Women's Doubles Final | (United States) Bethanie Mattek-Sands [7] (Czech Republic) Lucie Šafářová [7] | (Australia) Casey Dellacqua [12] (Kazakhstan) Yaroslava Shvedova [12] | 3–6, 6–4, 6–2 |
| Men's Singles Final | (Switzerland) Stan Wawrinka [8] | (Serbia) Novak Djokovic [1] | 4–6, 6–4, 6–3, 6–4 |
Matches on Court Suzanne Lenglen (Grandstand)
| Event | Winner | Loser | Score |
| Men's Legends Over 45 Doubles Final | (France) Guy Forget (France) Henri Leconte | (France) Cédric Pioline (Australia) Mark Woodforde | 4–6, 7–6^{(7–5)}, [10–3] |
| Men's Legends Under 45 Doubles Final | (Spain) Juan Carlos Ferrero (Spain) Carlos Moyá | (France) Arnaud Clément (France) Nicolas Escudé | 6–3, 6–3 |
