= Álvaro López San Martín =

Spanish tennis player (born 1997)

- Full name: Álvaro López San Martín
- Country (sports): Spain
- Born: 2 June 1997 (age 28) Barcelona, Spain
- Height: 178 cm (5 ft 10 in)
- Plays: Right-handed (two handed-backhand)
- Coach: Javier Duarte
- Prize money: $83,372

Singles
- Career record: 0–1
- Career titles: 0
- Highest ranking: No. 280 (19 June 2023)

Doubles
- Career record: 0–0
- Career titles: 0
- Highest ranking: No. 340 (10 April 2023)
Medal record
Mediterranean Games
Silver medal – second place	2022 Oran	Men's Doubles

Álvaro López San Martín (Spanish pronunciation: [ˈalβaɾo ˈlopeθ sam maɾˈtin]; born 2 June 1997 in Barcelona) is a Spanish tennis player.

López San Martín won the 2015 French Open boys' doubles championship, partnering Jaume Munar.

López San Martín has a career high ATP singles ranking of No. 280 achieved on 19 June 2023 and a doubles ranking of No. 340 achieved on 10 April 2023.

== Doubles: 1 (1 title) ==
Result	Year	Tournament	Surface	Partner	Opponents	Score
Win	2015	French Open	Clay	(Spain) Jaume Munar	(United States) William Blumberg (United States) Tommy Paul	6–4, 6–2

== ATP Challenger and ITF Futures finals ==
=== Singles: 26 (14–12) ===
Legend ATP Challenger (0–0) ITF Futures (14–12)	Finals by surface Hard (1–1) Clay (13–11) Grass (0–0) Carpet (0–0)

Result	W–L	Date	Tournament	Tier	Surface	Opponent	Score
Loss	0–1	May 2015	Spain F12, Lleida	Futures	Clay	(Spain) Gerard Granollers Pujol	6–1, 6–7^{(5–7)}, 4–6
Win	1–1	Aug 2016	Spain F27, Santander	Futures	Clay	(Italy) Alberto Brizzi	6–1, 6–1
Win	2–1	Sep 2016	Spain F29, Oviedo	Futures	Clay	(Spain) Albert Alcaraz Ivorra	7–5, 6–2
Win	3–1	Sep 2016	Spain F31, Seville	Futures	Clay	(Spain) Marc Giner	6–4, 6–1
Loss	3–2	Sep 2016	Spain F32, Sabadell	Futures	Clay	(Spain) Jaume Munar	walkover
Loss	3–3	Nov 2016	Morocco F8, Casablanca	Futures	Clay	(Morocco) Lamine Ouahab	4–6, 3–6
Loss	3–4	Nov 2016	Morocco F9, Rabat	Futures	Clay	(Morocco) Lamine Ouahab	6–3, 5–7, 4–6
Loss	3–5	Jul 2018	Spain F19, Gandia	Futures	Clay	(Spain) Marc Giner	5–7, 2–6
Loss	3–6	Aug 2018	Spain F23, Vigo	Futures	Clay	(Spain) Eduard Esteve Lobato	4–6, 7–5, 0–6
Win	4–6	Sep 2018	Spain F29, Sabadell	Futures	Clay	(Chile) Gonzalo Lama	7–6^{(7–2)}, 6–3
Win	5–6	Oct 2018	Spain F30, Melilla	Futures	Clay	(Spain) Eduard Esteve Lobato	6–2, 6–1
Loss	5–7	Mar 2019	M15 Loulé, Portugal	World Tennis Tour	Hard	(Switzerland) Sandro Ehrat	2–6, 4–6
Win	6–7	Mar 2019	M15 Murcia, Spain	World Tennis Tour	Clay	(Spain) Javier Barranco Cosano	7–5, 6–1
Loss	6–8	Nov 2019	M15 Antalya, Turkey	World Tennis Tour	Clay	(Croatia) Duje Ajduković	2–6, 4–6
Win	7–8	Dec 2019	M15 Antalya, Turkey	World Tennis Tour	Clay	(Hungary) Máté Valkusz	4–6, 6–2, 6–4
Loss	7–9	Dec 2020	M15 Madrid, Spain	World Tennis Tour	Clay	(France) Antoine Cornut-Chauvinc	4–6, 6–7^{(5–7)}
Win	8–9	May 2021	M15 Las Palmas, Spain	World Tennis Tour	Clay	(France) Kyrian Jacquet	7–6^{(8–6)}, 6–7^{(4–7)}, 7–5
Win	9–9	May 2021	M15 Valldoreix, Spain	World Tennis Tour	Clay	(Uruguay) Martín Cuevas	2–6, 6–1, 6–4
Win	10–9	Jun 2021	M25 Grasse, France	World Tennis Tour	Clay	(France) Valentin Royer	7–6^{(8–6)}, 7–5
Loss	10–10	Sep 2021	M25 Oviedo, Spain	World Tennis Tour	Clay	(Spain) Oriol Roca Batalla	6–7^{(2–7)}, 1–6
Win	11–10	Jul 2022	M25 Getxo, Spain	World Tennis Tour	Clay	(Spain) Àlex Martí Pujolràs	6–4, 2–6, 6–4
Loss	11–11	Aug 2022	M25 Agadir, Morocco	World Tennis Tour	Clay	(France) Émilien Voisin	3–6, 6–7^{(5–7)}
Win	12–11	Sep 2022	M15 Melilla, Spain	World Tennis Tour	Clay	(Switzerland) Mirko Martinez	6–2, 7–6^{(10–8)}
Loss	12–12	Sep 2022	M15 Sabadell, Spain	World Tennis Tour	Clay	(Spain) Max Alcalá Gurri	4–6, 1–6
Win	13–12	Nov 2022	M15 Benicarló, Spain	World Tennis Tour	Clay	(Spain) Carlos López Montagud	7–5, 6–4
Win	14–12	Jan 2023	M15 Manacor, Spain	World Tennis Tour	Hard	(Spain) Daniel Rincón	6–4, 3–6, 7–5

=== Doubles: 10 (7–3) ===
Legend ATP Challenger (0–0) ITF Futures (7–3)	Finals by surface Hard (0–1) Clay (7–2) Grass (0–0) Carpet (0–0)

Result	W–L	Date	Tournament	Tier	Surface	Partner	Opponents	Score
Win	1–0	May 2016	Spain F13, Valldoreix	Futures	Clay	(Spain) Jaume Munar	(Spain) Carlos Calderón-Rodriguez (Spain) Pedro Martínez	6–3, 3–6, [10–5]
Win	2–0	Jul 2016	Spain F20, Getxo	Futures	Clay	(Spain) Jaume Munar	(Spain) Juan Lizariturry (Spain) Jaume Pla Malfeito	6–4, ret.
Loss	2–1	Aug 2016	Spain F26, Vigo	Futures	Clay	(Spain) Jaume Munar	(Spain) Javier Barranco Cosano (Italy) Raúl Brancaccio	5–7, 4–6
Win	3–1	Aug 2016	Spain F27, Santander	Futures	Clay	(Spain) Eduard Esteve Lobato	(Spain) Marc Fornell Mestres (Venezuela) Jordi Muñoz Abreu	7–6, 6–4
Loss	3–2	Apr 2017	Spain F9, Madrid	Futures	Clay	(United Kingdom) Alexander Ward	(Argentina) Hernán Casanova (Bolivia) Federico Zeballos	6–7^{(4–7)}, 1–6
Win	4–2	Sep 2018	Spain F29, Sabadell	Futures	Clay	(Spain) Sergio Martos Gornés	(Spain) Jaume Pla Malfeito (Spain) Marc Giner	6–2, 6–1
Loss	4–3	Mar 2019	M15 Faro, Portugal	World Tennis Tour	Hard	(Morocco) Lamine Ouahab	(Portugal) Fred Gil (Argentina) Manuel Pena Lopez	2–6, 4–6
Win	5–3	Mar 2019	M15 Murcia, Spain	World Tennis Tour	Clay	(Spain) Eduard Esteve Lobato	(Italy) Lorenzo Bocchi (Italy) Francesco Passaro	6–4, 6–4
Win	6–3	Feb 2020	M15 Palmanova, Spain	World Tennis Tour	Clay	(Spain) Nikolás Sánchez Izquierdo	(France) Jonathan Eysseric (France) Maxime Mora	6–4, 7–6^{(7–4)}
Win	7–3	May 2022	M15 Valldoreix, Spain	World Tennis Tour	Clay	(Spain) Daniel Rincón	(Argentina) Franco Emanuel Egea (Syria) Hazem Naw	6–3, 6–2
