= Manuel Peña López =

Argentine tennis player

Manuel Peña
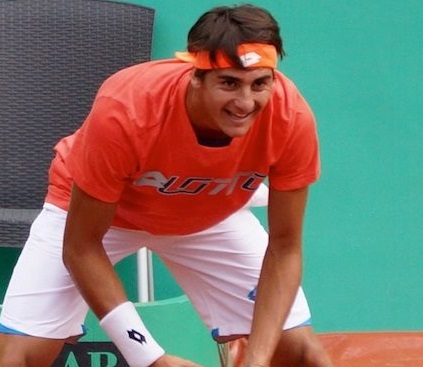
- Full name: Manuel Peña López
- Country (sports): Argentina
- Residence: Mendoza, Argentina
- Born: 10 February 1998 (age 27) Mendoza, Argentina
- Height: 182 cm (6 ft 0 in)
- Plays: Right-handed (two-handed backhand)
- Prize money: $65,703 (Singles & Doubles Combined)

Singles
- Career record: 0–0
- Career titles: 0
- Highest ranking: No. 395 (4 November 2019)

Grand Slam singles results
- French Open Junior: QF (2015)
- Wimbledon Junior: 1R (2015)
- US Open Junior: 1R (2015)

Doubles
- Career record: 1–3
- Career titles: 0
- Highest ranking: No. 299 (2 March 2020)

Grand Slam doubles results
- French Open Junior: 1R (2015)
- Wimbledon Junior: 1R (2015)
- US Open Junior: 1R (2015)

Manuel Peña López (Latin American Spanish: [maˈnwel ˈpeɲa ˈlopes]; born 10 February 1998) is a professional Argentine tennis player. He made his ATP World Tour debut in the 2014 Düsseldorf Open.
