= 2015 French Open – Boys' singles =

Boys' singles
- 2015 French Open

Final
- Champion: (United States) Tommy Paul
- Runner-up: (United States) Taylor Harry Fritz
- Score: 7–6^{(7–4)}, 2–6, 6–2

Events
Singles	men	women		boys	girls
Doubles	men	women	mixed	boys	girls
WC Singles	men	women	quad
WC Doubles	men	women	quad
Legends	−45	45+	women
- French Open

Andrey Rublev was the defending champion, but he chose not to participate this year.

Tommy Paul won the title, defeating Taylor Harry Fritz in an all-American final, 7–6^{(7–4)}, 2–6, 6–2.

== Seeds ==
1. (Brazil) Orlando Luz (third round)
2. (United States) Taylor Fritz (final)
3. (South Korea) Hong Seong-chan (second round)
4. (France) Corentin Denolly (semifinals)
5. (Norway) Viktor Durasovic (second round)
6. (United States) Michael Mmoh (semifinals)
7. (Japan) Akira Santillan (first round)
8. (South Korea) Chung Yun-seong (third round)
9. (United States) William Blumberg (first round)
10. (Chile) Tomás Barrios Vera (quarterfinals)
11. (Vietnam) Lý Hoàng Nam (third round)
12. (France) Théo Fournerie (third round)
13. (United States) Tommy Paul (champion)
14. (Sweden) Mikael Ymer (second round)
15. (Norway) Casper Ruud (third round)
16. (Greece) Stefanos Tsitsipas (third round)

== Main draw ==
Key

- Q = Qualifier
- WC = Wild card
- LL = Lucky loser
- Alt = Alternate
- ITF = ITF entry
- PR = Protected ranking
- SR = Special ranking
- SE = Special exempt
- JE = Junior exempt
- JR = Junior Accelerator Programme entrant
- CO = College Accelerator Programme entrant
- NG = Next Gen Accelerator Program entrant
- w/o = Walkover
- r = Retired
- d = Defaulted

=== Finals ===
Quarterfinals
(United States) Reilly Opelka	4	4
6	(United States) Michael Mmoh	6	6
13	(United States) Tommy Paul	6	6
(Argentina) Manuel Peña López	3	1
(Argentina) Juan Pablo Ficovich	0	6^{6}
4	(France) Corentin Denolly	6	7^{8}
10	(Chile) Tomás Barrios Vera	3	4
2	(United States) Taylor Fritz	6	6

Semifinals
6	(United States) Michael Mmoh	4	3
13	(United States) Tommy Paul	6	6
4	(France) Corentin Denolly	1	2
2	(United States) Taylor Fritz	6	6

Final
13	(United States) Tommy Paul	7^{7}	2	6
2	(United States) Taylor Fritz	6^{4}	6	2

=== Top half ===
==== Section 1 ====
First round
1	(Brazil) Orlando Luz	5	6	6
(Canada) Alejandro Tabilo	7	4	1
(France) Geoffrey Blancaneaux	3	4
(Italy) Gian Marco Moroni	6	6
(United States) Reilly Opelka	6^{5}	7^{7}	6
(Spain) Álvaro López San Martín	7^{7}	6^{3}	3
WC	(France) Clément Larrière	1	2
14	(Sweden) Mikael Ymer	6	6
12	(France) Théo Fournerie	6	6
Q	(Estonia) Kenneth Raisma	3	4
(Japan) Sora Fukuda	1	2
Q	(Slovakia) Patrik Néma	6	6
(Serbia) Miomir Kecmanović	3	6	1
(Hungary) Máté Valkusz	6	3	6
(Poland) Hubert Hurkacz	2	3
6	(United States) Michael Mmoh	6	6

Second round
1	(Brazil) O Luz	3	7^{7}	6
(Italy) GM Moroni	6	6^{5}	0
(United States) R Opelka	6	6
14	(Sweden) M Ymer	4	4
12	(France) T Fournerie	6	6
Q	(Slovakia) P Néma	3	1
(Hungary) M Valkusz	3	3
6	(United States) M Mmoh	6	6

Third round
1	(Brazil) O Luz	5	6	5
(United States) R Opelka	7	4	7
12	(France) T Fournerie	1	0
6	(United States) M Mmoh	6	6

Quarterfinals
(United States) R Opelka	4	4
6	(United States) M Mmoh	6	6

==== Section 2 ====
First round
3	(South Korea) Hong Seong-chan	3	6	8
(Finland) Patrik Niklas-Salminen	6	4	6
(Uzbekistan) Jurabek Karimov	6	6
WC	(France) Maxime Petel	1	4
(Russia) Bogdan Bobrov	2	0
SE	(Portugal) Felipe Cunha e Silva	6	6
(Japan) Jumpei Yamasaki	2	6^{3}
13	(United States) Tommy Paul	6	7^{7}
11	(Vietnam) Lý Hoàng Nam	6	6
WC	(France) Maxime Mora	3	4
(United States) Nathan Ponwith	3	7	6
Q	(Germany) Louis Wessels	6	5	2
Q	(Australia) Jake Delaney	0	2
(Argentina) Manuel Peña López	6	6
Q	(Japan) Renta Tokuda	6^{2}	6	3
5	(Norway) Viktor Durasovic	7^{7}	2	6

Second round
3	(South Korea) S-c Hong	2	3
(Uzbekistan) J Karimov	6	6
SE	(Portugal) F Cunha e Silva	1	3
13	(United States) T Paul	6	6
11	(Vietnam) NH Lý	6	6
(United States) N Ponwith	1	2
(Argentina) M Peña López	4	7	7
5	(Norway) V Durasovic	6	5	5

Third round
(Uzbekistan) J Karimov	1	2
13	(United States) T Paul	6	6
11	(Vietnam) NH Lý	7^{7}	3	8
(Argentina) M Peña López	6^{4}	6	10

Quarterfinals
13	(United States) T Paul	6	6
(Argentina) M Peña López	3	1

=== Bottom half ===
==== Section 3 ====
First round
8	(South Korea) Chung Yun-seong	6	6
(Australia) Marc Polmans	2	3
(Japan) Yosuke Watanuki	3	5
(India) Sumit Nagal	6	7
WC	(France) Ronan Joncour	6	4	0
(Argentina) Juan Pablo Ficovich	4	6	6
(Russia) Alexander Bublik	3	7^{7}	9
9	(United States) William Blumberg	6	6^{3}	7
15	(Norway) Casper Ruud	6	7^{7}
WC	(France) Evan Furness	3	6^{2}
Q	(Italy) Andrea Pellegrino	2	7^{7}	10
(Spain) Jaume Munar	6	6^{5}	12
(United States) Alex Rybakov	4	6	6
(Tunisia) Aziz Dougaz	6	0	2
(Switzerland) Johan Nikles	3	6	3
4	(France) Corentin Denolly	6	4	6

Second round
8	(South Korea) Y-s Chung	2	6	6
(India) S Nagal	6	3	4
(Argentina) JP Ficovich	3	6	6
(Russia) A Bublik	6	3	4
15	(Norway) C Ruud	1	7	6
(Spain) J Munar	6	5	2
(United States) A Rybakov	2	0
4	(France) C Denolly	6	6

Third round
8	(South Korea) Y-s Chung	6^{3}	7^{7}	3
(Argentina) JP Ficovich	7^{7}	6^{5}	6
15	(Norway) C Ruud	3	2
4	(France) C Denolly	6	6

Quarterfinals
(Argentina) JP Ficovich	0	6^{6}
4	(France) C Denolly	6	7^{8}

==== Section 4 ====
First round
7	(Japan) Akira Santillan	4	6	4
(Slovakia) Alex Molčan	6	3	6
(United States) Ulises Blanch	6	6
(Argentina) Franco Capalbo	1	1
(Portugal) Nuno Borges	3	3
(South Korea) Oh Chan-yeong	6	6
Q	(France) Alexandre Müller	3	2
10	(Chile) Tomás Barrios Vera	6	6
16	(Greece) Stefanos Tsitsipas	7^{9}	4	6
(Russia) Denys Klok	6^{7}	6	3
Q	(Romania) Dragoș Nicolae Mădăraș	4	3
WC	(France) Ugo Humbert	6	6
SE	(Germany) Tim Sandkaulen	6	6
WC	(France) Quentin Folliot	2	3
WC	(Brazil) Gabriel Décamps	1	4
2	(United States) Taylor Fritz	6	6

Second round
(Slovakia) A Molčan	6	6
(United States) U Blanch	2	2
(South Korea) C-y Oh	2	2
10	(Chile) T Barrios Vera	6	6
16	(Greece) S Tsitsipas	6^{4}	6	6
WC	(France) U Humbert	7^{7}	3	2
SE	(Germany) T Sandkaulen	3	6^{4}
2	(United States) T Fritz	6	7^{7}

Third round
(Slovakia) A Molčan	4	1
10	(Chile) T Barrios Vera	6	6
16	(Greece) S Tsitsipas	3	2
2	(United States) T Fritz	6	6

Quarterfinals
10	(Chile) T Barrios Vera	3	4
2	(United States) T Fritz	6	6

== Qualifying ==
=== Seeds ===
1. (Italy) Andrea Pellegrino (qualified)
2. (Japan) Yusuke Takahashi (first round)
3. (Australia) Jake Delaney (qualified)
4. (Italy) Federico Bonacia (first round)
5. (Slovakia) Lukáš Klein (first round)
6. (Peru) Juan José Rosas (first round)
7. (Poland) Michał Dembek (first round)
8. (Estonia) Kenneth Raisma (qualified)
9. (Spain) Eduard Güell (first round)
10. (Brazil) Igor Marcondes (qualifying competition)
11. (Japan) Renta Tokuda (qualified)
12. (Argentina) Gerónimo Espín Busleiman (qualifying competition)
13. (Switzerland) Marko Osmakcic (qualifying competition)
14. (Germany) Louis Wessels (qualified)
15. (Romania) Dragoș Nicolae Mădăraș (qualified)
16. (Chinese Taipei) Wu Tung-lin (qualifying competition)

=== Qualifiers ===
1. (Italy) Andrea Pellegrino
2. (France) Alexandre Müller
3. (Australia) Jake Delaney
4. (Slovakia) Patrik Néma
5. (Japan) Renta Tokuda
6. (Romania) Dragoș Nicolae Mădăraș
7. (Germany) Louis Wessels
8. (Estonia) Kenneth Raisma

=== Qualifying draw ===
==== First qualifier ====
First round
1	(Italy) Andrea Pellegrino	7^{7}	7
WC	(France) Mandresy Rakotomalala	6^{3}	5
(Mexico) Alan Fernando Rubio Fierros	0	1
13	(Switzerland) Marko Osmakcic	6	6

Qualifying competition
1	(Italy) Andrea Pellegrino	6	6
13	(Switzerland) Marko Osmakcic	1	1

==== Second qualifier ====
First round
2	(Japan) Yusuke Takahashi	2	1
WC	(France) Alexandre Müller	6	6
(Denmark) Benjamin Hannestad	6	4	3
12	(Argentina) Gerónimo Espín Busleiman	3	6	6

Qualifying competition
WC	(France) Alexandre Müller	7^{7}	6
12	(Argentina) Gerónimo Espín Busleiman	6^{2}	2

==== Third qualifier ====
First round
3	(Australia) Jake Delaney	6	6
(United States) Emil Reinberg	3	4
WC	(France) Constant de la Bassetière	6^{5}	3
10	(Brazil) Igor Marcondes	7^{7}	6

Qualifying competition
3	(Australia) Jake Delaney	6^{2}	6	7^{7}
10	(Brazil) Igor Marcondes	7^{7}	2	6^{3}

==== Fourth qualifier ====
First round
4	(Italy) Federico Bonacia	6	5
(Slovakia) Patrik Néma	4	7	6
(Spain) Miguel Semmler	1	4
16	(Chinese Taipei) Wu Tung-lin	6	6

Qualifying competition
(Slovakia) Patrik Néma	6	6
16	(Chinese Taipei) Wu Tung-lin	2	1

==== Fifth qualifier ====
First round
5	(Slovakia) Lukáš Klein	3	6^{3}
WC	(France) Constantin Bittoun Kouzmine	6	7^{7}
(Philippines) Alberto Lim	1	0
11	(Japan) Renta Tokuda	6	6

Qualifying competition
WC	(France) Constantin Bittoun Kouzmine	0	3
11	(Japan) Renta Tokuda	6	6

==== Sixth qualifier ====
First round
6	(Peru) Juan José Rosas	4	4
(Italy) Marco Mosciatti	6	6
WC	(France) Matteo Martineau	2	6^{6}
15	(Romania) Dragoș Nicolae Mădăraș	6	7^{8}

Qualifying competition
(Italy) Marco Mosciatti	2	2
15	(Romania) Dragoș Nicolae Mădăraș	6	6

==== Seventh qualifier ====
First round
7	(Poland) Michał Dembek	4	6	2
(Australia) Alex de Minaur	6	2	6
(China) Wu Yibing	2	2
14	(Germany) Louis Wessels	6	6

Qualifying competition
(Australia) Alex de Minaur	3	6	3
14	(Germany) Louis Wessels	6	4	6

==== Eighth qualifier ====
First round
8	(Estonia) Kenneth Raisma	6	6
WC	(France) Louis Tessa	4	4
(Japan) Yuya Ito	6	4	7
9	(Spain) Eduard Güell	3	6	5

Qualifying competition
8	(Estonia) Kenneth Raisma	6	6
(Japan) Yuya Ito	2	2
