= 2015 French Open – Boys' doubles =

Boys' doubles
- 2015 French Open

Final
- Champions: (Spain) Álvaro López San Martín (Spain) Jaume Munar
- Runners-up: (United States) William Blumberg (United States) Tommy Paul
- Score: 6–4, 6–2

Events
| Singles | men | women | | boys | girls |
| Doubles | men | women | mixed | boys | girls |
| WC Singles | men | women | quad |
| WC Doubles | men | women | quad |
| Legends | −45 | 45+ | women |
| ← 2014 · | French Open | · 2016 → |

Benjamin Bonzi and Quentin Halys were the defending champions, but were not eligible to compete this year.

Álvaro López San Martín and Jaume Munar won the title, defeating William Blumberg and Tommy Paul in the final, 6–4, 6–2.

== Seeds ==
1. (United States) Taylor Harry Fritz / (Brazil) Orlando Luz (quarterfinals)
2. (South Korea) Chung Yun-seong / (South Korea) Hong Seong-chan (first round)
3. (United States) Michael Mmoh / (Japan) Akira Santillan (quarterfinals)
4. (United States) William Blumberg / (United States) Tommy Paul (final)
5. (Serbia) Miomir Kecmanović / (Norway) Casper Ruud (first round)
6. (Chile) Marcelo Tomás Barrios Vera / (Italy) Andrea Pellegrino (second round)
7. (Russia) Alexander Bublik / (Sweden) Mikael Ymer (second round)
8. (Uzbekistan) Jurabek Karimov / (Argentina) Manuel Peña López (first round)

== Draw ==
=== Key ===
- Q = Qualifier
- WC = Wild card
- LL = Lucky loser
- Alt = Alternate
- SE = Special exempt
- PR = Protected ranking
- ITF = ITF entry
- JE = Junior exempt
- w/o = Walkover
- r = Retired
- d = Defaulted
- SR = Special ranking

=== Finals ===
Semifinals
(Germany) Tim Sandkaulen (Hungary) Máté Valkusz | 6 | 5 | [4]
(Spain) Álvaro López San Martín (Spain) Jaume Munar | 4 | 7 | [10]
4 | (United States) William Blumberg (United States) Tommy Paul | 7 | 6
(Argentina) Franco Capalbo (Argentina) Gerónimo Espín Busleiman | 5 | 2

Final
(Spain) Álvaro López San Martín (Spain) Jaume Munar | 6 | 6
4 | (United States) William Blumberg (United States) Tommy Paul | 4 | 2

=== Top half ===
First round
1 | (United States) Taylor Harry Fritz (Brazil) Orlando Luz | 6 | 6
WC | (France) Evan Furness (France) Louis Tessa | 4 | 2
(Portugal) Nuno Borges (Tunisia) Aziz Dougaz | 2 | 7^{7} | [5]
(Japan) Sora Fukuda (Japan) Yosuke Watanuki | 6 | 6^{2} | [10]
WC | (France) Matteo Martineau (France) Alexandre Müller | 0 | 3
(Russia) Bogdan Bobrov (Vietnam) Lý Hoàng Nam | 6 | 6
(Germany) Tim Sandkaulen (Hungary) Máté Valkusz | 7^{7} | 4 | [10]
8 | (Uzbekistan) Jurabek Karimov (Argentina) Manuel Peña López | 6^{4} | 6 | [5]
3 | (United States) Michael Mmoh (Japan) Akira Santillan | 6 | 6
(Italy) Gian Marco Moroni (Greece) Stefanos Tsitsipas | 1 | 4
(Portugal) Felipe Cunha e Silva (Canada) Alejandro Tabilo | 6 | 6
WC | (France) Geoffrey Blancaneaux (France) Ugo Humbert | 2 | 1
(Spain) Álvaro López San Martín (Spain) Jaume Munar | 6 | 6
(Australia) Jake Delaney (Australia) Marc Polmans | 4 | 0
(United States) Nathan Ponwith (United States) Alex Rybakov | 3 | 4
7 | (Russia) Alexander Bublik (Sweden) Mikael Ymer | 6 | 6

Second round
1 | (United States) TH Fritz (Brazil) O Luz | 7 | 6
(Japan) S Fukuda (Japan) Y Watanuki | 5 | 2
(Russia) B Bobrov (Vietnam) NH Lý | 2 | 5
(Germany) T Sandkaulen (Hungary) M Valkusz | 6 | 7
3 | (United States) M Mmoh (Japan) A Santillan | 6 | 6
(Portugal) F Cunha e Silva (Canada) A Tabilo | 2 | 2
(Spain) Á López San Martín (Spain) J Munar | 6 | 6
7 | (Russia) A Bublik (Sweden) M Ymer | 2 | 3

Quarterfinals
1 | (United States) TH Fritz (Brazil) O Luz | 4 | 6 | [5]
(Germany) T Sandkaulen (Hungary) M Valkusz | 6 | 2 | [10]
3 | (United States) M Mmoh (Japan) A Santillan | 3 | 3
(Spain) Á López San Martín (Spain) J Munar | 6 | 6

Semifinals
(Germany) T Sandkaulen (Hungary) M Valkusz | 6 | 5 | [4]
(Spain) Á López San Martín (Spain) J Munar | 4 | 7 | [10]

=== Bottom half ===
First round
5 | (Serbia) Miomir Kecmanović (Norway) Casper Ruud | 2 | 6 | [5]
WC | (France) Constantin Bittoun Kouzmine (France) Mandresy Rakotomalala | 6 | 3 | [10]
(Romania) Dragoș Nicolae Mădăraș (Germany) Louis Wessels | 6 | 5 | [10]
(Switzerland) Marko Osmakcic (Peru) Juan José Rosas | 2 | 7 | [8]
(Poland) Hubert Hurkacz (Slovakia) Alex Molčan | 6 | 6
(Slovakia) Patrik Néma (South Korea) Oh Chan-yeong | 3 | 4
(Russia) Denys Klok (Estonia) Kenneth Raisma | 3 | 4
4 | (United States) William Blumberg (United States) Tommy Paul | 6 | 6
6 | (Chile) Marcelo Tomás Barrios Vera (Italy) Andrea Pellegrino | 6 | 6^{7} | [10]
(United States) Ulises Blanch (Argentina) Juan Pablo Ficovich | 4 | 7^{9} | [8]
(France) Corentin Denolly (Switzerland) Johan Nikles | 6 | 3 | [14]
WC | (France) Clément Larrière (France) Maxime Mora | 1 | 6 | [12]
(Japan) Renta Tokuda (Japan) Jumpei Yamasaki | 4 | 6^{7}
(Argentina) Franco Capalbo (Argentina) Gerónimo Espín Busleiman | 6 | 7^{9}
(Norway) Viktor Durasovic (Finland) Patrik Niklas-Salminen | 7^{7} | 6
2 | (South Korea) Chung Yun-seong (South Korea) Hong Seong-chan | 6^{3} | 2

Second round
WC | (France) C Bittoun Kouzmine (France) M Rakotomalala | 2 | 5
(Romania) DN Mădăraș (Germany) L Wessels | 6 | 7
(Poland) H Hurkacz (Slovakia) A Molčan | 3 | 2
4 | (United States) W Blumberg (United States) T Paul | 6 | 6
6 | (Chile) MT Barrios Vera (Italy) A Pellegrino | 7 | 5 | [8]
(France) C Denolly (Switzerland) J Nikles | 5 | 7 | [10]
(Argentina) F Capalbo (Argentina) G Espín Busleiman | 4 | 6 | [10]
(Norway) V Durasovic (Finland) P Niklas-Salminen | 6 | 3 | [5]

Quarterfinals
(Romania) DN Mădăraș (Germany) L Wessels | 1 | 4
4 | (United States) W Blumberg (United States) T Paul | 6 | 6
(France) C Denolly (Switzerland) J Nikles | 2 | 6 | [7]
(Argentina) F Capalbo (Argentina) G Espín Busleiman | 6 | 4 | [10]

Semifinals
4 | (United States) W Blumberg (United States) T Paul | 7 | 6
(Argentina) F Capalbo (Argentina) G Espín Busleiman | 5 | 2
