= 2015 French Open – Wheelchair men's singles =

Wheelchair men's singles
- 2015 French Open

Final
- Champion: (Japan) Shingo Kunieda
- Runner-up: (France) Stéphane Houdet
- Score: 6–1, 6–0

Events
Singles	men	women		boys	girls
Doubles	men	women	mixed	boys	girls
WC Singles	men	women	quad
WC Doubles	men	women	quad
Legends	−45	45+	women
- French Open

Defending champion Shingo Kunieda defeated Stéphane Houdet in the final, 6–1, 6–0 to win the men's singles wheelchair tennis title at the 2015 French Open. It was his sixth French Open singles title and 19th major singles title overall, and he dropped just three games en route.

== Seeds ==
1. (Japan) Shingo Kunieda (champion)
2. (France) Stéphane Houdet (final)

== Draw ==
Key

- Q = Qualifier
- WC = Wild card
- LL = Lucky loser
- Alt = Alternate
- ITF = ITF entry
- PR = Protected ranking
- SR = Special ranking
- SE = Special exempt
- JE = Junior exempt
- JR = Junior Accelerator Programme entrant
- CO = College Accelerator Programme entrant
- NG = Next Gen Accelerator Program entrant
- w/o = Walkover
- r = Retired
- d = Defaulted

=== Finals ===
Quarterfinals
1	(Japan) Shingo Kunieda	6	6
WC	(France) Michaël Jeremiasz	0	2
(United Kingdom) Gordon Reid	2	3
(Netherlands) Maikel Scheffers	6	6
(France) Nicolas Peifer	7^{7}	6
(Argentina) Gustavo Fernández	6^{3}	2
(Belgium) Joachim Gérard	5	5
2	(France) Stéphane Houdet	7	7

Semifinals
1	(Japan) Shingo Kunieda	6	6
(Netherlands) Maikel Scheffers	0	0
(France) Nicolas Peifer	3	2
2	(France) Stéphane Houdet	6	6

Final
1	(Japan) Shingo Kunieda	6	6
2	(France) Stéphane Houdet	1	0
