= Maxime Mora =

French badminton player (born 1984)

Personal information
- Born: 10 July 1984 (age 42) Bruges, France

Sport
- Country: France
- Sport: Badminton

Men's singles & doubles
- Highest ranking: 129 (November 2009)
- BWF profile

Maxime Mora (born 10 July 1984) is a French badminton player. In 2004, he reached the men's singles quarter final at the Bulgarian International tournament. At the 2005 French Open, he also finished in the quarter final round. In 2008, he won the men's singles title at the French University Badminton Championship, and at the same year, he represented University of Paris XII competed at the World University Championships in Braga, Portugal.

== Achievements ==
=== BWF International Challenge/Series ===
Men's singles
Year	Tournament	Opponent	Score	Result
2009	Mauritius International	(Czech Republic) Jan Frohlich	Walkover	(silver) Runner-up

BWF International Challenge tournament
BWF International Series tournament
