= 2015 French Open – Wheelchair men's doubles =

Wheelchair men's doubles
- 2015 French Open

Final
- Champions: (Japan) Shingo Kunieda (United Kingdom) Gordon Reid
- Runners-up: (Argentina) Gustavo Fernández (France) Nicolas Peifer
- Score: 6–1, 7–6^{(7–1)}

Events
Singles	men	women		boys	girls
Doubles	men	women	mixed	boys	girls
WC Singles	men	women	quad
WC Doubles	men	women	quad
Legends	−45	45+	women
- French Open

Shingo Kunieda and Gordon Reid defeated Gustavo Fernández and Nicolas Peifer in the final, 6–1, 7–6^{(7–1)} to win the men's doubles wheelchair tennis title at the 2015 French Open. With the win, Kunieda completed a non-calendar-year Grand Slam.

Joachim Gérard and Stéphane Houdet were the defending champions, but were defeated by Fernández and Peifer in the semifinals.

== Seeds ==
1. (Belgium) Joachim Gérard / (France) Stéphane Houdet (semifinals)
2. (Japan) Shingo Kunieda / (United Kingdom) Gordon Reid (champions)

== Draw ==
Key

- Q = Qualifier
- WC = Wild card
- LL = Lucky loser
- Alt = Alternate
- ITF = ITF entry
- PR = Protected ranking
- SR = Special ranking
- SE = Special exempt
- JE = Junior exempt
- JR = Junior Accelerator Programme entrant
- CO = College Accelerator Programme entrant
- NG = Next Gen Accelerator Program entrant
- w/o = Walkover
- r = Retired
- d = Defaulted

=== Finals ===
Semifinals
1	(Belgium) Joachim Gérard (France) Stéphane Houdet	1	6	[7]
(Argentina) Gustavo Fernández (France) Nicolas Peifer	6	4	[10]
(France) Michaël Jeremiasz (Netherlands) Maikel Scheffers	3	3
2	(Japan) Shingo Kunieda (United Kingdom) Gordon Reid	6	6

Final
(Argentina) Gustavo Fernández (France) Nicolas Peifer	1	6^{1}
2	(Japan) Shingo Kunieda (United Kingdom) Gordon Reid	6	7^{7}
