= 2015 French Open – Wheelchair women's doubles =

Wheelchair women's doubles
- 2015 French Open

Final
- Champions: (Netherlands) Jiske Griffioen (Netherlands) Aniek van Koot
- Runners-up: (Japan) Yui Kamiji (United Kingdom) Jordanne Whiley
- Score: 7–6^{(7–1)}, 3–6, [10–8]

Events
Singles	men	women		boys	girls
Doubles	men	women	mixed	boys	girls
WC Singles	men	women	quad
WC Doubles	men	women	quad
Legends	−45	45+	women
- French Open

Jiske Griffioen and Aniek van Koot defeated the defending champions Yui Kamiji and Jordanne Whiley in a rematch of the previous year's final, 7–6^{(7–1)}, 3–6, [10–8] to win the women's doubles wheelchair tennis title at the 2015 French Open.

== Seeds ==
1. (Japan) Yui Kamiji / (United Kingdom) Jordanne Whiley (final)
2. (Netherlands) Jiske Griffioen / (Netherlands) Aniek van Koot (champions)

== Draw ==
Key

- Q = Qualifier
- WC = Wild card
- LL = Lucky loser
- Alt = Alternate
- ITF = ITF entry
- PR = Protected ranking
- SR = Special ranking
- SE = Special exempt
- JE = Junior exempt
- JR = Junior Accelerator Programme entrant
- CO = College Accelerator Programme entrant
- NG = Next Gen Accelerator Program entrant
- w/o = Walkover
- r = Retired
- d = Defaulted

=== Finals ===
Semifinals
1	(Japan) Yui Kamiji (United Kingdom) Jordanne Whiley	6	6
(France) Charlotte Famin (Netherlands) Sharon Walraven	3	1
(Netherlands) Marjolein Buis (Germany) Sabine Ellerbrock	6	2	[6]
2	(Netherlands) Jiske Griffioen (Netherlands) Aniek van Koot	3	6	[10]

Final
1	(Japan) Yui Kamiji (United Kingdom) Jordanne Whiley	6^{1}	6	[8]
2	(Netherlands) Jiske Griffioen (Netherlands) Aniek van Koot	7^{7}	3	[10]
