= 2015 French Open – Wheelchair women's singles =

Wheelchair women's singles
- 2015 French Open

Final
- Champion: (Netherlands) Jiske Griffioen
- Runner-up: (Netherlands) Aniek van Koot
- Score: 6–0, 6–2

Events
Singles	men	women		boys	girls
Doubles	men	women	mixed	boys	girls
WC Singles	men	women	quad
WC Doubles	men	women	quad
Legends	−45	45+	women
- French Open

Jiske Griffioen defeated Aniek van Koot in the final, 6–0, 6–2 to win the women's singles wheelchair tennis title at the 2015 French Open.

Yui Kamiji was the defending champion, but was defeated in the semifinals by van Koot in a rematch of the previous year's final.

== Seeds ==
1. (Japan) Yui Kamiji (semifinals)
2. (Netherlands) Jiske Griffioen (champion)

== Draw ==
Key

- Q = Qualifier
- WC = Wild card
- LL = Lucky loser
- Alt = Alternate
- ITF = ITF entry
- PR = Protected ranking
- SR = Special ranking
- SE = Special exempt
- JE = Junior exempt
- JR = Junior Accelerator Programme entrant
- CO = College Accelerator Programme entrant
- NG = Next Gen Accelerator Program entrant
- w/o = Walkover
- r = Retired
- d = Defaulted

=== Finals ===
Quarterfinals
1	(Japan) Yui Kamiji	6	6
WC	(France) Charlotte Famin	2	0
(Netherlands) Aniek van Koot	6	6
(Netherlands) Marjolein Buis	2	4
(Germany) Sabine Ellerbrock	6	6
(Netherlands) Sharon Walraven	0	1
(United Kingdom) Jordanne Whiley	4	5
2	(Netherlands) Jiske Griffioen	6	7

Semifinals
1	(Japan) Yui Kamiji	4	6	6^{4}
(Netherlands) Aniek van Koot	6	4	7^{7}
(Germany) Sabine Ellerbrock	7^{7}	5	0
2	(Netherlands) Jiske Griffioen	6^{4}	7	6

Final
(Netherlands) Aniek van Koot	0	2
2	(Netherlands) Jiske Griffioen	6	6
