= 2015 French Open – Girls' singles =

Girls' singles
- 2015 French Open

Final
- Champion: (Spain) Paula Badosa Gibert
- Runner-up: (Russia) Anna Kalinskaya
- Score: 6–3, 6–3

Events
Singles	men	women		boys	girls
Doubles	men	women	mixed	boys	girls
WC Singles	men	women	quad
WC Doubles	men	women	quad
Legends	−45	45+	women
← 2014 ·	French Open	· 2016 →

Daria Kasatkina was the defending champion, but chose not to participate this year.

Paula Badosa Gibert won the title, defeating Anna Kalinskaya in the final, 6–3, 6–3.

== Seeds ==
1. (Czech Republic) Markéta Vondroušová (semifinals)
2. (China) Xu Shilin (first round)
3. (United States) Katerina Stewart (quarterfinals)
4. (United States) CiCi Bellis (semifinals)
5. (Hungary) Dalma Gálfi (second round)
6. (Canada) Charlotte Robillard-Millette (third round)
7. (United States) Usue Maitane Arconada (second round)
8. (United Kingdom) Katie Swan (third round)
9. (Romania) Elena Ruse (second round)
10. (Slovakia) Tereza Mihalíková (first round)
11. (United States) Sofia Kenin (first round)
12. (Spain) Paula Badosa Gibert (champion)
13. (Czech Republic) Miriam Kolodziejová (third round)
14. (Russia) Anna Blinkova (third round)
15. (Argentina) Julieta Lara Estable (second round)
16. (Russia) Anna Kalinskaya (final)

== Main draw ==
=== Key ===
- Q = Qualifier
- WC = Wild card
- LL = Lucky loser
- Alt = Alternate
- SE = Special exempt
- PR = Protected ranking
- ITF = ITF entry
- JE = Junior exempt
- w/o = Walkover
- r = Retired
- d = Defaulted
- SR = Special ranking

=== Finals ===
Quarterfinals
1	(Czech Republic) Markéta Vondroušová	6	6
SE	(Germany) Katharina Hobgarski	3	2
3	(United States) Katerina Stewart	2	2
12	(Spain) Paula Badosa Gibert	6	6
(Switzerland) Jil Teichmann	2	1
4	(United States) CiCi Bellis	6	6
(Hungary) Fanny Stollár	7^{7}	0	2
16	(Russia) Anna Kalinskaya	6^{4}	6	6

Semifinals
1	(Czech Republic) Markéta Vondroušová	4	6^{8}
12	(Spain) Paula Badosa Gibert	6	7^{10}
4	(United States) CiCi Bellis	2	1
16	(Russia) Anna Kalinskaya	6	6

Final
12	(Spain) Paula Badosa Gibert	6	6
16	(Russia) Anna Kalinskaya	3	3

=== Top half ===
==== Section 1 ====
First round
1	(Czech Republic) Markéta Vondroušová	5	6	6
(United States) Raveena Kingsley	7	3	1
(Australia) Olivia Tjandramulia	5	0
(Brazil) Luisa Stefani	7	6
Q	(Russia) Anastasia Gasanova	1	6^{3}
SE	(United Kingdom) Emily Arbuthnott	6	7^{7}
WC	(France) Loudmilla Bencheikh	5	3
15	(Argentina) Julieta Lara Estable	7	6
11	(United States) Sofia Kenin	2	6	4
(Slovenia) Tamara Zidanšek	6	2	6
(Romania) Jaqueline Cristian	2	3
SE	(Germany) Katharina Hobgarski	6	6
WC	(France) Emmanuelle Salas	2	3
(Russia) Olesya Pervushina	6	6
(China) Zheng Wushuang	0	0
5	(Hungary) Dalma Gálfi	6	6

Second round
1	(Czech Republic) M Vondroušová	6	6
(Brazil) L Stefani	4	2
SE	(United Kingdom) E Arbuthnott	4	6	6
15	(Argentina) JL Estable	6	0	1
(Slovenia) T Zidanšek	1	2
SE	(Germany) K Hobgarski	6	6
(Russia) O Pervushina	4	6	6
5	(Hungary) D Gálfi	6	4	0

Third round
1	(Czech Republic) M Vondroušová	6	6
SE	(United Kingdom) E Arbuthnott	2	0
SE	(Germany) K Hobgarski	6	4	6
(Russia) O Pervushina	1	6	4

Quarterfinals
1	(Czech Republic) M Vondroušová	6	6
SE	(Germany) K Hobgarski	3	2

==== Section 2 ====
First round
3	(United States) Katerina Stewart	6	6
WC	(France) Lucie Wargnier	1	2
(India) Pranjala Yadlapalli	6^{1}	4
Q	(Australia) Priscilla Hon	7^{7}	6
Q	(Slovakia) Viktória Kužmová	6	6
(Belarus) Vera Lapko	4	2
(United Kingdom) Maia Lumsden	2	1
14	(Russia) Anna Blinkova	6	6
12	(Spain) Paula Badosa Gibert	6	6
(Italy) Bianca Turati	3	1
(United States) Francesca Di Lorenzo	4	6^{2}
(Russia) Evgeniya Levashova	6	7^{7}
WC	(France) Tessah Andrianjafitrimo	6	6
WC	(China) Ma Shuyue	2	2
Q	(Czech Republic) Monika Kilnarová	6	2	3
6	(Canada) Charlotte Robillard-Millette	2	6	6

Second round
3	(United States) K Stewart	6	6
Q	(Australia) P Hon	4	2
Q	(Slovakia) V Kužmová	3	2
14	(Russia) A Blinkova	6	6
12	(Spain) P Badosa Gibert	6	7
(Russia) E Levashova	4	5
WC	(France) T Andrianjafitrimo	0	2
6	(Canada) C Robillard-Millette	6	6

Third round
3	(United States) K Stewart	6	5	6
14	(Russia) A Blinkova	1	7	1
12	(Spain) P Badosa Gibert	6	6
6	(Canada) C Robillard-Millette	3	3

Quarterfinals
3	(United States) K Stewart	2	2
12	(Spain) P Badosa Gibert	6	6

=== Bottom half ===
==== Section 3 ====
First round
8	(United Kingdom) Katie Swan	4	6	8
(United States) Michaela Gordon	6	4	6
(Spain) Eva Guerrero Álvarez	6^{4}	3
(Canada) Katherine Sebov	7^{7}	6
(Switzerland) Jil Teichmann	7	6
(Russia) Aleksandra Pospelova	5	2
WC	(France) Emmanuelle Girard	1	3
9	(Romania) Elena Ruse	6	6
13	(Czech Republic) Miriam Kolodziejová	6	6
Q	(Indonesia) Deria Nur Haliza	0	2
WC	(France) Valentine Bacher	6^{4}	0
(Argentina) Nadia Podoroska	7^{7}	6
(Russia) Sofya Zhuk	7	6
(Australia) Naiktha Bains	5	3
(Belgium) Greet Minnen	1	1
4	(United States) CiCi Bellis	6	6

Second round
8	(United Kingdom) K Swan	7	7
(Canada) K Sebov	5	5
(Switzerland) J Teichmann	6	6
9	(Romania) E Ruse	1	2
13	(Czech Republic) M Kolodziejová	6	6
(Argentina) N Podoroska	2	2
(Russia) S Zhuk	6	1	6
4	(United States) CC Bellis	4	6	8

Third round
8	(United Kingdom) K Swan	4	6	3
(Switzerland) J Teichmann	6	3	6
13	(Czech Republic) M Kolodziejová	2	4
4	(United States) CC Bellis	6	6

Quarterfinals
(Switzerland) J Teichmann	2	1
4	(United States) CC Bellis	6	6

==== Section 4 ====
First round
7	(United States) Usue Maitane Arconada	6	4	6
(Denmark) Emilie Francati	3	6	3
(Australia) Sara Tomic	0	0
(Spain) Aliona Bolsova Zadoinov	6	6
(Hungary) Fanny Stollár	2	6	6
Q	(Italy) Beatrice Torelli	6	3	0
(France) Fiona Ferro	6	6
10	(Slovakia) Tereza Mihalíková	3	1
16	(Russia) Anna Kalinskaya	0	6	6
Q	(Canada) Bianca Andreescu	6	3	2
(Algeria) Inès Ibbou	5	6	6
(Japan) Chihiro Muramatsu	7	2	4
(Australia) Seone Mendez	4	4
(United States) Caroline Dolehide	6	6
WC	(France) Margot Yerolymos	4	6	7
2	(China) Xu Shilin	6	2	5

Second round
7	(United States) UM Arconada	7^{7}	3	2
(Spain) A Bolsova Zadoinov	6^{5}	6	6
(Hungary) F Stollár	6	6^{1}	6
(France) F Ferro	2	7^{7}	4
16	(Russia) A Kalinskaya	6	6
(Algeria) I Ibbou	3	2
(United States) C Dolehide	6	6
WC	(France) M Yerolymos	3	3

Third round
(Spain) A Bolsova Zadoinov	4	2
(Hungary) F Stollár	6	6
16	(Russia) A Kalinskaya	7	6
(United States) C Dolehide	5	3

Quarterfinals
(Hungary) F Stollár	7^{7}	0	2
16	(Russia) A Kalinskaya	6^{4}	6	6
