= 2015 French Open – Girls' doubles =

Girls' doubles
- 2015 French Open

Final
- Champions: (Czech Republic) Miriam Kolodziejová (Czech Republic) Markéta Vondroušová
- Runners-up: (United States) Caroline Dolehide (United States) Katerina Stewart
- Score: 6–0, 6–3

Events
| Singles | men | women | | boys | girls |
| Doubles | men | women | mixed | boys | girls |
| WC Singles | men | women | quad |
| WC Doubles | men | women | quad |
| Legends | −45 | 45+ | women |
| ← 2014 · | French Open | · 2016 → |

Miriam Kolodziejová and Markéta Vondroušová won the title, defeating Caroline Dolehide and Katerina Stewart in the final, 6–0, 6–3.

Ioana Ducu and Ioana Loredana Roșca were the defending champions, but were no longer eligible to participate in junior events.

== Seeds ==
1. (Czech Republic) Miriam Kolodziejová / (Czech Republic) Markéta Vondroušová (champions)
2. (United States) Sofia Kenin / (United Kingdom) Katie Swan (quarterfinals)
3. (Hungary) Dalma Gálfi / (Hungary) Fanny Stollár (quarterfinals)
4. (United States) Michaela Gordon / (Canada) Charlotte Robillard-Millette (second round)
5. (United States) Usue Maitane Arconada / (Argentina) Nadia Podoroska (semifinals)
6. (United States) Caroline Dolehide / (United States) Katerina Stewart (final)
7. (India) Pranjala Yadlapalli / (China) Zheng Wushuang (quarterfinals)
8. (Russia) Anna Kalinskaya / (Russia) Aleksandra Pospelova (first round)

== Draw ==
=== Key ===
- Q = Qualifier
- WC = Wild card
- LL = Lucky loser
- Alt = Alternate
- SE = Special exempt
- PR = Protected ranking
- ITF = ITF entry
- JE = Junior exempt
- w/o = Walkover
- r = Retired
- d = Defaulted
- SR = Special ranking

=== Finals ===
Semifinals
1 | (Czech Republic) Miriam Kolodziejová (Czech Republic) Markéta Vondroušová | 6 | 7
(Switzerland) Jil Teichmann (China) Xu Shilin | 4 | 5
6 | (United States) Caroline Dolehide (United States) Katerina Stewart | 6 | 7^{7}
5 | (United States) Usue Maitane Arconada (Argentina) Nadia Podoroska | 1 | 6^{0}

Final
1 | (Czech Republic) Miriam Kolodziejová (Czech Republic) Markéta Vondroušová | 6 | 6
6 | (United States) Caroline Dolehide (United States) Katerina Stewart | 0 | 3

=== Top half ===
First round
1 | (Czech Republic) Miriam Kolodziejová (Czech Republic) Markéta Vondroušová | 6 | 6
Alt | (Argentina) Ornella Garavani (Mexico) Jessica Hinojosa Gómez | 1 | 1
(United Kingdom) Emily Arbuthnott (Denmark) Emilie Francati | 3 | 6 | [6]
(Belarus) Vera Lapko (Slovakia) Tereza Mihalíková | 6 | 0 | [10]
(France) Fiona Ferro (France) Margot Yerolymos | 6 | 7
(Spain) Eva Guerrero Álvarez (Czech Republic) Monika Kilnarová | 2 | 5
(United States) Francesca Di Lorenzo (Brazil) Luisa Stefani | 6 | 4 | [11]
8 | (Russia) Anna Kalinskaya (Russia) Aleksandra Pospelova | 4 | 6 | [9]
4 | (United States) Michaela Gordon (Canada) Charlotte Robillard-Millette | 6 | 6
WC | (France) Valentine Bacher (France) Emma Léné | 2 | 4
(Italy) Beatrice Torelli (Italy) Bianca Turati | 4 | 3
(Switzerland) Jil Teichmann (China) Xu Shilin | 6 | 6
(Brazil) Thaisa Pedretti (United States) Alexandra Sanford | 6^{5} | 0
(Russia) Anastasia Gasanova (United Kingdom) Maia Lumsden | 7^{7} | 6
WC | (France) Cindy Castille (France) Carla Hassaine | 0 | 1
7 | (India) Pranjala Yadlapalli (China) Zheng Wushuang | 6 | 6

Second round
1 | (Czech Republic) M Kolodziejová (Czech Republic) M Vondroušová | 6 | 6
(Belarus) V Lapko (Slovakia) T Mihalíková | 2 | 2
(France) F Ferro (France) M Yerolymos | 0 | 4
(United States) F Di Lorenzo (Brazil) L Stefani | 6 | 6
4 | (United States) M Gordon (Canada) C Robillard-Millette | 1 | 6 | [8]
(Switzerland) J Teichmann (China) S Xu | 6 | 2 | [10]
(Russia) A Gasanova (United Kingdom) M Lumsden | 5 | 4
7 | (India) P Yadlapalli (China) W Zheng | 7 | 6

Quarterfinals
1 | (Czech Republic) M Kolodziejová (Czech Republic) M Vondroušová | 6 | 6
(United States) F Di Lorenzo (Brazil) L Stefani | 2 | 4
(Switzerland) J Teichmann (China) S Xu | 6 | 6
7 | (India) P Yadlapalli (China) W Zheng | 1 | 3

Semifinals
1 | (Czech Republic) M Kolodziejová (Czech Republic) M Vondroušová | 6 | 7
(Switzerland) J Teichmann (China) S Xu | 4 | 5

=== Bottom half ===
First round
6 | (United States) Caroline Dolehide (United States) Katerina Stewart | 7 | 6
(Japan) Chihiro Muramatsu (Australia) Olivia Tjandramulia | 5 | 2
(Spain) Aliona Bolsova Zadoinov (Romania) Elena Ruse | 6 | 7
(Australia) Naiktha Bains (Algeria) Inès Ibbou | 3 | 5
WC | (France) Schena Benamar (France) Lucie Wargnier | 7^{7} | 4 | [10]
(Canada) Katherine Sebov (Russia) Sofya Zhuk | 6^{4} | 6 | [8]
(Russia) Evgeniya Levashova (Slovenia) Tamara Zidanšek | 5 | 3
3 | (Hungary) Dalma Gálfi (Hungary) Fanny Stollár | 7 | 6
5 | (United States) Usue Maitane Arconada (Argentina) Nadia Podoroska | 6 | 6
(Romania) Jaqueline Cristian (Slovakia) Viktória Kužmová | 2 | 3
(Germany) Katharina Hobgarski (Belgium) Greet Minnen | 4 | 6^{5}
(Canada) Bianca Andreescu (Russia) Olesya Pervushina | 6 | 7^{7}
(France) Tessah Andrianjafitrimo (Australia) Seone Mendez | 7^{9} | 6
(Argentina) Julieta Lara Estable (Colombia) María Fernanda Herazo | 6^{7} | 3
WC | (France) Emmanuelle Girard (France) Léa Romain | 2 | 2
2 | (United States) Sofia Kenin (United Kingdom) Katie Swan | 6 | 6

Second round
6 | (United States) C Dolehide (United States) K Stewart | 4 | 6 | [11]
(Spain) A Bolsova Zadoinov (Romania) E Ruse | 6 | 4 | [9]
WC | (France) S Benamar (France) L Wargnier | 2 | 6 | [10]
3 | (Hungary) D Gálfi (Hungary) F Stollár | 6 | 2 | [12]
5 | (United States) UM Arconada (Argentina) N Podoroska | 7^{7} | 3 | [10]
(Canada) B Andreescu (Russia) O Pervushina | 6^{2} | 6 | [5]
(France) T Andrianjafitrimo (Australia) S Mendez | 5 | 4
2 | (United States) S Kenin (United Kingdom) K Swan | 7 | 6

Quarterfinals
6 | (United States) C Dolehide (United States) K Stewart | 7 | 4 | [10]
3 | (Hungary) D Gálfi (Hungary) F Stollár | 5 | 6 | [5]
5 | (United States) UM Arconada (Argentina) N Podoroska | 6^{2} | 6 | [10]
2 | (United States) S Kenin (United Kingdom) K Swan | 7^{7} | 2 | [5]

Semifinals
6 | (United States) C Dolehide (United States) K Stewart | 6 | 7^{7}
5 | (United States) UM Arconada (Argentina) N Podoroska | 1 | 6^{0}
