= 2015 French Open – Men's doubles =

Men's doubles
- 2015 French Open

Final
- Champions: (Croatia) Ivan Dodig (Brazil) Marcelo Melo
- Runners-up: (United States) Bob Bryan (United States) Mike Bryan
- Score: 6–7^{(5–7)}, 7–6^{(7–5)}, 7–5

Details
- Draw: 64
- Seeds: 16

Events
Singles	men	women		boys	girls
Doubles	men	women	mixed	boys	girls
WC Singles	men	women	quad
WC Doubles	men	women	quad
Legends	−45	45+	women
← 2014 ·	French Open	· 2016 →

Julien Benneteau and Édouard Roger-Vasselin were the defending champions, but Benneteau withdrew from the tournament because of a sports hernia. Roger-Vasselin played alongside Guillermo García-López, but lost in the third round to Ivan Dodig and Marcelo Melo.

Dodig and Melo went on to win the title, defeating Bob and Mike Bryan in the final, 6–7^{(5–7)}, 7–6^{(7–5)}, 7–5.

== Seeds ==
1. (United States) Bob Bryan / (United States) Mike Bryan (final)
2. (Canada) Vasek Pospisil / (United States) Jack Sock (quarterfinals)
3. (Croatia) Ivan Dodig / (Brazil) Marcelo Melo (champions)
4. (Spain) Marcel Granollers / (Spain) Marc López (first round)
5. (Netherlands) Jean-Julien Rojer / (Romania) Horia Tecău (semifinals)
6. (Italy) Simone Bolelli / (Italy) Fabio Fognini (semifinals)
7. (Poland) Marcin Matkowski / (Serbia) Nenad Zimonjić (quarterfinals)
8. (Austria) Alexander Peya / (Brazil) Bruno Soares (quarterfinals)

9. (India) Rohan Bopanna / (Romania) Florin Mergea (third round)
10. (Canada) Daniel Nestor / (India) Leander Paes (third round)
11. (United Kingdom) Jamie Murray / (Australia) John Peers (third round)
12. (Uruguay) Pablo Cuevas / (Spain) David Marrero (second round)
13. (Croatia) Marin Draganja / (Finland) Henri Kontinen (second round)
14. (France) Pierre-Hugues Herbert / (France) Nicolas Mahut (third round)
15. (Spain) Guillermo García-López / (France) Édouard Roger-Vasselin (third round)
16. (Colombia) Juan Sebastián Cabal / (Colombia) Robert Farah (first round)

== Draw ==
=== Key ===
- Q = Qualifier
- WC = Wild card
- LL = Lucky loser
- Alt = Alternate
- ITF = ITF entry
- PR = Protected ranking
- SR = Special ranking
- SE = Special exempt
- JE = Junior exempt
- JR = Junior Accelerator Programme entrant
- CO = College Accelerator Programme entrant
- NG = Next Gen Accelerator Program entrant
- w/o = Walkover
- r = Retired
- d = Defaulted

=== Finals ===
Quarterfinals
1	(United States) Bob Bryan (United States) Mike Bryan	6	6^{5}	6
7	(Poland) Marcin Matkowski (Serbia) Nenad Zimonjić	4	7^{7}	4
(Moldova) Radu Albot (Czech Republic) Lukáš Rosol	2	7	2
6	(Italy) Simone Bolelli (Italy) Fabio Fognini	6	5	6
8	(Austria) Alexander Peya (Brazil) Bruno Soares	3	6^{8}
3	(Croatia) Ivan Dodig (Brazil) Marcelo Melo	6	7^{10}
5	(Netherlands) Jean-Julien Rojer (Romania) Horia Tecău	6	6
2	(Canada) Vasek Pospisil (United States) Jack Sock	3	3

Semifinals
1	(United States) Bob Bryan (United States) Mike Bryan	6	6
6	(Italy) Simone Bolelli (Italy) Fabio Fognini	3	3
3	(Croatia) Ivan Dodig (Brazil) Marcelo Melo	6	7
5	(Netherlands) Jean-Julien Rojer (Romania) Horia Tecău	3	5

Final
1	(United States) Bob Bryan (United States) Mike Bryan	7^{7}	6^{5}	5
3	(Croatia) Ivan Dodig (Brazil) Marcelo Melo	6^{5}	7^{7}	7

=== Top half ===
==== Section 1 ====
First round
1	(United States) B Bryan (United States) M Bryan	7^{10}	6
(South Africa) R Klaasen (Chinese Taipei) Y-h Lu	6^{8}	2
WC	(Australia) T Kokkinakis (France) L Pouille	6	6
PR	(India) M Bhupathi (Australia) N Kyrgios	3	1
PR	(Germany) F Mayer (Germany) F Moser	6	4	7^{7}
(Luxembourg) G Müller (Pakistan) A-u-H Qureshi	3	6	6^{1}
(France) J Chardy (Poland) Ł Kubot	6	6
16	(Colombia) JS Cabal (Colombia) R Farah	4	3
11	(United Kingdom) J Murray (Australia) J Peers	6^{6}	6	6
(Brazil) T Bellucci (Portugal) J Sousa	7^{8}	4	2
(Colombia) S Giraldo (Serbia) D Lajović	6	7^{7}
WC	(France) T Lamasine (France) J Tatlot	3	6^{5}
(Germany) J-L Struff (Austria) D Thiem	6^{3}	5
(Spain) P Carreño Busta (Spain) D Gimeno-Traver	7^{7}	7
(New Zealand) M Daniell (Belgium) S Darcis	5	1
7	(Poland) M Matkowski (Serbia) N Zimonjić	7	6

Second round
1	(United States) B Bryan (United States) M Bryan	7^{7}	7^{7}
WC	(Australia) T Kokkinakis (France) L Pouille	6^{4}	6^{3}
PR	(Germany) F Mayer (Germany) F Moser	6^{3}	3
(France) J Chardy (Poland) Ł Kubot	7^{7}	6
11	(United Kingdom) J Murray (Australia) J Peers	6	6
(Colombia) S Giraldo (Serbia) D Lajović	1	2
(Spain) P Carreño Busta (Spain) D Gimeno-Traver	4	6^{5}
7	(Poland) M Matkowski (Serbia) N Zimonjić	6	7^{7}

Third round
1	(United States) B Bryan (United States) M Bryan	6	7
(France) J Chardy (Poland) Ł Kubot	4	5
11	(United Kingdom) J Murray (Australia) J Peers	3	5
7	(Poland) M Matkowski (Serbia) N Zimonjić	6	7

Quarterfinals
1	(United States) B Bryan (United States) M Bryan	6	6^{5}	6
7	(Poland) M Matkowski (Serbia) N Zimonjić	4	7^{7}	4

==== Section 2 ====
First round
4	(Spain) M Granollers (Spain) M López	3	6^{5}
(Netherlands) R Haase (Russia) M Youzhny	6	7^{7}
(Moldova) R Albot (Czech Republic) L Rosol	6	6
WC	(France) A Michon (France) G Mina	2	3
(Mexico) S González (Mexico) MÁ Reyes-Varela	4	7^{7}	2
(Argentina) M González (Brazil) A Sá	6	6^{4}	6
(Philippines) T Huey (United States) S Lipsky	6	1	4
13	(Croatia) M Draganja (Finland) H Kontinen	4	6	6
10	(Canada) D Nestor (India) L Paes	6	5	7
(Australia) J Duckworth (Australia) C Guccione	2	7	5
(United States) E Butorac (Australia) S Groth	6^{5}	4
(Germany) A Begemann (Austria) J Knowle	7^{7}	6
(Czech Republic) F Čermák (Czech Republic) J Veselý	6	7
(United Kingdom) A Bedene (Spain) A Ramos-Viñolas	4	5
WC	(France) E Couacaud (France) Q Halys	2	2
6	(Italy) S Bolelli (Italy) F Fognini	6	6

Second round
(Netherlands) R Haase (Russia) M Youzhny	1	7^{8}	3
(Moldova) R Albot (Czech Republic) L Rosol	6	6^{6}	6
(Argentina) M González (Brazil) A Sá	6	6
13	(Croatia) M Draganja (Finland) H Kontinen	3	3
10	(Canada) D Nestor (India) L Paes	7^{7}	6
(Germany) A Begemann (Austria) J Knowle	6^{3}	2
(Czech Republic) F Čermák (Czech Republic) J Veselý	1^{r}
6	(Italy) S Bolelli (Italy) F Fognini	5

Third round
(Moldova) R Albot (Czech Republic) L Rosol	2	7^{7}	7
(Argentina) M González (Brazil) A Sá	6	6^{4}	5
10	(Canada) D Nestor (India) L Paes	2	4
6	(Italy) S Bolelli (Italy) F Fognini	6	6

Quarterfinals
(Moldova) R Albot (Czech Republic) L Rosol	2	7	2
6	(Italy) S Bolelli (Italy) F Fognini	6	5	6

=== Bottom half ===
==== Section 3 ====
First round
8	(Austria) A Peya (Brazil) B Soares	6	6
(Italy) A Seppi (Ukraine) S Stakhovsky	2	1
(United States) N Monroe (New Zealand) A Sitak	4	6	6
(Germany) D Brown (Austria) A Haider-Maurer	6	4	4
(Argentina) C Berlocq (Argentina) L Mayer	6^{5}	6	7^{7}
(Poland) J Janowicz (Finland) J Nieminen	7^{7}	3	6^{4}
(United States) R Ram (Argentina) H Zeballos	2	5
12	(Uruguay) P Cuevas (Spain) D Marrero	6	7
15	(Spain) G García-López (France) É Roger-Vasselin	7^{7}	6
WC	(France) K de Schepper (France) B Paire	6^{3}	3
(Spain) F López (Belarus) M Mirnyi	3	6	6
(United Kingdom) C Fleming (United Kingdom) J Marray	6	3	2
(Croatia) M Pavić (New Zealand) M Venus	2	4
(Spain) P Andújar (Austria) O Marach	6	6
(Germany) B Becker (Germany) A Satschko	2	6^{2}
3	(Croatia) I Dodig (Brazil) M Melo	6	7^{7}

Second round
8	(Austria) A Peya (Brazil) B Soares	4	6	7
(United States) N Monroe (New Zealand) A Sitak	6	2	5
(Argentina) C Berlocq (Argentina) L Mayer	6	6^{5}	7^{7}
12	(Uruguay) P Cuevas (Spain) D Marrero	1	7^{7}	6^{3}
15	(Spain) G García-López (France) É Roger-Vasselin	6	6
(Spain) F López (Belarus) M Mirnyi	4	2
(Spain) P Andújar (Austria) O Marach	6	2	3
3	(Croatia) I Dodig (Brazil) M Melo	4	6	6

Third round
8	(Austria) A Peya (Brazil) B Soares	6	7^{8}
(Argentina) C Berlocq (Argentina) L Mayer	4	6^{6}
15	(Spain) G García-López (France) É Roger-Vasselin	1	4
3	(Croatia) I Dodig (Brazil) M Melo	6	6

Quarterfinals
8	(Austria) A Peya (Brazil) B Soares	3	6^{8}
3	(Croatia) I Dodig (Brazil) M Melo	6	7^{10}

==== Section 4 ====
First round
5	(Netherlands) J-J Rojer (Romania) H Tecău	6	7^{7}
(Australia) R Junaid (Canada) A Shamasdin	4	6^{5}
(Slovakia) M Kližan (Austria) P Oswald	6	6^{5}	2
(United States) S Johnson (United States) S Querrey	2	7^{7}	6
WC	(France) F Serra (France) M Teixeira	1	3
(United States) A Krajicek (United States) D Young	6	6
(Serbia) F Krajinović (Serbia) V Troicki	7	3	4
9	(India) R Bopanna (Romania) F Mergea	5	6	6
14	(France) P-H Herbert (France) N Mahut	7	6^{5}	6
(Argentina) F Delbonis (Argentina) D Schwartzman	5	7^{7}	2
(Kazakhstan) A Golubev (Uzbekistan) D Istomin	7^{7}	6
(Sweden) J Brunström (Kazakhstan) M Kukushkin	6^{5}	4
(Sweden) R Lindstedt (Austria) J Melzer	1	6	6
WC	(France) G Monfils (France) J Ouanna	6	4	3
(Dominican Republic) V Estrella Burgos (Brazil) J Souza	6^{3}	6	6^{4}
2	(Canada) V Pospisil (United States) J Sock	7^{7}	4	7^{7}

Second round
5	(Netherlands) J-J Rojer (Romania) H Tecău	6	6
(United States) S Johnson (United States) S Querrey	4	0
(United States) A Krajicek (United States) D Young	6	3	5
9	(India) R Bopanna (Romania) F Mergea	3	6	7
14	(France) P-H Herbert (France) N Mahut	6	6^{3}	7^{7}
(Kazakhstan) A Golubev (Uzbekistan) D Istomin	4	7^{7}	6^{2}
(Sweden) R Lindstedt (Austria) J Melzer	4	4
2	(Canada) V Pospisil (United States) J Sock	6	6

Third round
5	(Netherlands) J-J Rojer (Romania) H Tecău	6	6^{7}	6
9	(India) R Bopanna (Romania) F Mergea	3	7^{9}	3
14	(France) P-H Herbert (France) N Mahut	6^{3}	6^{2}
2	(Canada) V Pospisil (United States) J Sock	7^{7}	7^{7}

Quarterfinals
5	(Netherlands) J-J Rojer (Romania) H Tecău	6	6
2	(Canada) V Pospisil (United States) J Sock	3	3
