= 2015 French Open – Legends over 45 doubles =

Legends over 45 doubles
- 2015 French Open

Final
- Champions: (France) Guy Forget (France) Henri Leconte
- Runners-up: (France) Cédric Pioline (Australia) Mark Woodforde
- Score: 4–6, 7–6^{(7–5)}, [10–3]

Events
Singles	men	women		boys	girls
Doubles	men	women	mixed	boys	girls
WC Singles	men	women	quad
WC Doubles	men	women	quad
Legends	−45	45+	women
← 2014 ·	French Open	· 2016 →

In 2015 John McEnroe and Patrick McEnroe were the defending champions, but were eliminated in the round-robin stage.

Guy Forget and Henri Leconte won the title, defeating Cédric Pioline and Mark Woodforde in the final, 4–6, 7–6^{(7–5)}, [10–3].

== Draw ==
=== Key ===
- Q = Qualifier
- WC = Wild card
- LL = Lucky loser
- Alt = Alternate
- ITF = ITF entry
- PR = Protected ranking
- SR = Special ranking
- SE = Special exempt
- JE = Junior exempt
- JR = Junior Accelerator Programme entrant
- CO = College Accelerator Programme entrant
- NG = Next Gen Accelerator Program entrant
- w/o = Walkover
- r = Retired
- d = Defaulted

=== Final ===
Final
(France) Cédric Pioline (Australia) Mark Woodforde	6	6^{5}	[3]
(France) Guy Forget (France) Henri Leconte	4	7^{7}	[10]

=== Group C ===
		(United States) J McEnroe (United States) P McEnroe	(France) Pioline (Australia) Woodforde	(Australia) Cash (Ecuador) Gómez	RR; W–L	Set; W–L	Game; W–L	Standings
C1	(United States) John McEnroe (United States) Patrick McEnroe		4–6, 1–6	6–3, 6–4	1–1	2–2	17–19	2
C2	(France) Cédric Pioline (Australia) Mark Woodforde	6–4, 6–1		6–4, 6–4	2–0	4–0	24–13	1
C3	(Australia) Pat Cash (Ecuador) Andrés Gómez	3–6, 4–6	4–6, 4–6		0–2	0–4	15–24	3

Standings are determined by: 1. number of wins; 2. number of matches; 3. in three-players-ties, percentage of sets won, or of games won; 4. steering-committee decision.

=== Group D ===
		(France) Forget (France) Leconte	(Sweden) Pernfors (Sweden) Wilander	(France) Bahrami (Netherlands) Haarhuis	RR; W–L	Set; W–L	Game; W–L	Standings
D1	(France) Guy Forget (France) Henri Leconte		6–2, 7–6^{(9–7)}	7–6^{(7–1)}, 6–4	2–0	4–0	26–18	1
D2	(Sweden) Mikael Pernfors (Sweden) Mats Wilander	2–6, 6–7^{(7–9)}		1–6, 4–6	0–2	0–4	13–25	3
D3	(France) Mansour Bahrami (Netherlands) Paul Haarhuis	6–7^{(1–7)}, 4–6	6–1, 6–4		1–1	2–2	22–18	2

Standings are determined by: 1. number of wins; 2. number of matches; 3. in three-players-ties, percentage of sets won, or of games won; 4. steering-committee decision.
