= 2015 French Open – Legends under 45 doubles =

Legends under 45 doubles
- 2015 French Open

Final
- Champions: (Spain) Juan Carlos Ferrero (Spain) Carlos Moyá
- Runners-up: (France) Arnaud Clément (France) Nicolas Escudé
- Score: 6–3, 6–3

Events
Singles	men	women		boys	girls
Doubles	men	women	mixed	boys	girls
WC Singles	men	women	quad
WC Doubles	men	women	quad
Legends	−45	45+	women
← 2014 ·	French Open	· 2016 →

Mansour Bahrami and Fabrice Santoro were the defending champions, but Bahrami competed in the Legends Over 45 Doubles event. Santoro played alongside Sébastien Grosjean, but they were eliminated in the round-robin stage.

Juan Carlos Ferrero and Carlos Moyá won the title, defeating Arnaud Clément and Nicolas Escudé in the final, 6–3, 6–3.

== Draw ==
=== Key ===
- Q = Qualifier
- WC = Wild card
- LL = Lucky loser
- Alt = Alternate
- ITF = ITF entry
- PR = Protected ranking
- SR = Special ranking
- SE = Special exempt
- JE = Junior exempt
- JR = Junior Accelerator Programme entrant
- CO = College Accelerator Programme entrant
- NG = Next Gen Accelerator Program entrant
- w/o = Walkover
- r = Retired
- d = Defaulted

=== Final ===
Final
(Spain) Juan Carlos Ferrero (Spain) Carlos Moyá	6	6
(France) Arnaud Clément (France) Nicolas Escudé	3	3

=== Group A ===
		(France) Grosjean (France) Santoro	(Spain) Ferrero (Spain) Moyá	(United States) Chang (Croatia) Ivanišević	RR; W–L	Set; W–L	Game; W–L	Standings
A1	(France) Sébastien Grosjean (France) Fabrice Santoro		6–4, 3–6, ret.	6–3, 6–3	1–1	3–1	21–16	2
A2	(Spain) Juan Carlos Ferrero (Spain) Carlos Moyá	4–6, 6–3, ret.		6–3, 6–3	2–0	3–1	22–15	1
A3	(United States) Michael Chang (Croatia) Goran Ivanišević	3–6, 3–6	3–6, 3–6		0–2	0–4	12–24	3

Standings are determined by: 1. number of wins; 2. number of matches; 3. in three-players-ties, percentage of sets won, or of games won; 4. steering-committee decision.

=== Group B ===
		(France) Clément (France) Escudé	(Spain) Bruguera (Argentina) Gaudio	(Russia) Kafelnikov (Ukraine) Medvedev	RR; W–L	Set; W–L	Game; W–L	Standings
B1	(France) Arnaud Clément (France) Nicolas Escudé		5–7, 6–1, [10–8]	6–4, 7–5	2–0	4–1	25–17	1
B2	(Spain) Sergi Bruguera (Argentina) Gastón Gaudio	7–5, 1–6, [8–10]		4–6, 4–6	0–2	1–4	16–24	3
B3	(Russia) Yevgeny Kafelnikov (Ukraine) Andriy Medvedev	4–6, 5–7	6–4, 6–4		1–1	2–2	21–21	2

Standings are determined by: 1. number of wins; 2. number of matches; 3. in three-players-ties, percentage of sets won, or of games won; 4. steering-committee decision.
