= 2015 French Open – Mixed doubles =

Mixed doubles
- 2015 French Open

Final
- Champions: (United States) Bethanie Mattek-Sands (United States) Mike Bryan
- Runners-up: (Czech Republic) Lucie Hradecká (Poland) Marcin Matkowski
- Score: 7–6^{(7–3)}, 6–1

Details
- Draw: 32
- Seeds: 8

Events
Singles	men	women		boys	girls
Doubles	men	women	mixed	boys	girls
WC Singles	men	women	quad
WC Doubles	men	women	quad
Legends	−45	45+	women
- French Open

Anna-Lena Grönefeld and Jean-Julien Rojer were the defending champions, but lost in the second round to Chan Yung-jan and John Peers.

Bethanie Mattek-Sands and Mike Bryan won the title, defeating Lucie Hradecká and Marcin Matkowski in the final, 7–6^{(7–3)}, 6–1.

== Seeds ==
1. (India) Sania Mirza / (Brazil) Bruno Soares (first round)
2. (United States) Bethanie Mattek-Sands / (United States) Mike Bryan (champions)
3. (Russia) Elena Vesnina / (Serbia) Nenad Zimonjić (first round)
4. (Czech Republic) Andrea Hlaváčková / (Spain) Marc López (first round)
5. (France) Caroline Garcia / (United States) Bob Bryan (first round)
6. (France) Kristina Mladenovic / (Canada) Daniel Nestor (second round)
7. (Hungary) Tímea Babos / (Austria) Alexander Peya (quarterfinals)
8. (Switzerland) Martina Hingis / (India) Leander Paes (second round)

== Draw ==
Key

- Q = Qualifier
- WC = Wild card
- LL = Lucky loser
- Alt = Alternate
- ITF = ITF entry
- PR = Protected ranking
- SR = Special ranking
- SE = Special exempt
- JE = Junior exempt
- JR = Junior Accelerator Programme entrant
- CO = College Accelerator Programme entrant
- NG = Next Gen Accelerator Program entrant
- w/o = Walkover
- r = Retired
- d = Defaulted

=== Finals ===
Semifinals
(China) Zheng Jie (Finland) Henri Kontinen	5	6^{5}
(Czech Republic) Lucie Hradecká (Poland) Marcin Matkowski	7	7^{7}
(Slovenia) Katarina Srebotnik (Romania) Horia Tecău	6	3	[8]
2	(United States) Bethanie Mattek-Sands (United States) Mike Bryan	4	6	[10]

Final
(Czech Republic) Lucie Hradecká (Poland) Marcin Matkowski	6^{3}	1
2	(United States) Bethanie Mattek-Sands (United States) Mike Bryan	7^{7}	6

=== Top half ===
First round
1	(India) S Mirza (Brazil) B Soares	2	2
(Germany) A-L Grönefeld (Netherlands) J-J Rojer	6	6
(Chinese Taipei) H-c Chan (Croatia) M Draganja	3	4
(Chinese Taipei) Y-j Chan (Australia) J Peers	6	6
(China) J Zheng (Finland) H Kontinen	6	6
WC	(France) C de Bernardi (France) M Hamou	2	3
Alt	(Slovenia) A Klepač (United States) R Ram	3	7	[10]
5	(France) C Garcia (United States) B Bryan	6	5	[8]
3	(Russia) E Vesnina (Serbia) N Zimonjić	6	6^{2}	[8]
(Netherlands) M Krajicek (Romania) F Mergea	4	7^{7}	[10]
(Czech Republic) L Hradecká (Poland) M Matkowski	7^{7}	0	[10]
(Kazakhstan) Y Shvedova (India) R Bopanna	6^{5}	6	[3]
WC	(France) J Coin (France) N Mahut	4	5
(United States) A Spears (United States) S Lipsky	6	7
(Spain) A Parra Santonja (Spain) D Marrero	3	6^{1}
7	(Hungary) T Babos (Austria) A Peya	6	7^{7}

Second round
(Germany) A-L Grönefeld (Netherlands) J-J Rojer	1	4
(Chinese Taipei) Y-j Chan (Australia) J Peers	6	6
(China) J Zheng (Finland) H Kontinen	6	1	[11]
Alt	(Slovenia) A Klepač (United States) R Ram	3	6	[9]
(Netherlands) M Krajicek (Romania) F Mergea	6	6^{6}	[6]
(Czech Republic) L Hradecká (Poland) M Matkowski	4	7^{8}	[10]
(United States) A Spears (United States) S Lipsky	6^{5}	3
7	(Hungary) T Babos (Austria) A Peya	7^{7}	6

Quarterfinals
(Chinese Taipei) Y-j Chan (Australia) J Peers	4	4
(China) J Zheng (Finland) H Kontinen	6	6
(Czech Republic) L Hradecká (Poland) M Matkowski	7^{7}	3	[10]
7	(Hungary) T Babos (Austria) A Peya	6^{4}	6	[8]

Semifinals
(China) J Zheng (Finland) H Kontinen	5	6^{5}
(Czech Republic) L Hradecká (Poland) M Matkowski	7	7^{7}

=== Bottom half ===
First round
8	(Switzerland) M Hingis (India) L Paes	6	6
(Russia) A Kudryavtseva (Colombia) JS Cabal	2	3
WC	(France) S Foretz (France) É Roger-Vasselin	2	4
(Slovenia) K Srebotnik (Romania) H Tecău	6	6
(United States) R Kops-Jones (Colombia) R Farah	7^{7}	6
(Russia) A Pavlyuchenkova (Croatia) I Karlović	6^{4}	3
PR	(Spain) MJ Martínez Sánchez (Sweden) R Lindstedt	7	2	[10]
4	(Czech Republic) A Hlaváčková (Spain) M López	5	6	[5]
6	(France) K Mladenovic (Canada) D Nestor	4	6	[10]
WC	(France) M Johansson (France) A Mannarino	6	3	[8]
WC	(France) C Paquet (France) B Paire	3	5
(Australia) An Rodionova (Pakistan) A-u-H Qureshi	6	7
Alt	(Poland) A Rosolska (South Africa) R Klaasen	5	4
(Ukraine) E Svitolina (United Kingdom) J Murray	7	6
(Canada) E Bouchard (Belarus) M Mirnyi	1	4
2	(United States) B Mattek-Sands (United States) M Bryan	6	6

Second round
8	(Switzerland) M Hingis (India) L Paes	7^{8}	3	[6]
(Slovenia) K Srebotnik (Romania) H Tecău	6^{6}	6	[10]
(United States) R Kops-Jones (Colombia) R Farah	4	4
PR	(Spain) MJ Martínez Sánchez (Sweden) R Lindstedt	6	6
6	(France) K Mladenovic (Canada) D Nestor	4	3
(Australia) An Rodionova (Pakistan) A-u-H Qureshi	6	6
(Ukraine) E Svitolina (United Kingdom) J Murray	3	3
2	(United States) B Mattek-Sands (United States) M Bryan	6	6

Quarterfinals
(Slovenia) K Srebotnik (Romania) H Tecău	6	6
PR	(Spain) MJ Martínez Sánchez (Sweden) R Lindstedt	3	2
(Australia) An Rodionova (Pakistan) A-u-H Qureshi	0	6^{3}
2	(United States) B Mattek-Sands (United States) M Bryan	6	7^{7}

Semifinals
(Slovenia) K Srebotnik (Romania) H Tecău	6	3	[8]
2	(United States) B Mattek-Sands (United States) M Bryan	4	6	[10]
