= 2015 French Open – Women's legends doubles =

Women's legends doubles
- 2015 French Open

Final
- Champions: (Belgium) Kim Clijsters (United States) Martina Navratilova
- Runners-up: (United States) Lindsay Davenport (United States) Mary Joe Fernández
- Score: 2–6, 6–2, [11–9]

Events
Singles	men	women		boys	girls
Doubles	men	women	mixed	boys	girls
WC Singles	men	women	quad
WC Doubles	men	women	quad
Legends	−45	45+	women
← 2014 ·	French Open	· 2016 →

Kim Clijsters and Martina Navratilova were the defending champions and successfully defended their title, defeating Lindsay Davenport and Mary Joe Fernández in the final, 2–6, 6–2, [11–9].

== Draw ==
=== Key ===
- Q = Qualifier
- WC = Wild card
- LL = Lucky loser
- Alt = Alternate
- ITF = ITF entry
- PR = Protected ranking
- SR = Special ranking
- SE = Special exempt
- JE = Junior exempt
- JR = Junior Accelerator Programme entrant
- CO = College Accelerator Programme entrant
- NG = Next Gen Accelerator Program entrant
- w/o = Walkover
- r = Retired
- d = Defaulted

=== Final ===
Final
(Belgium) Kim Clijsters (United States) Martina Navratilova	2	6	[11]
(United States) Lindsay Davenport (United States) Mary Joe Fernández	6	2	[9]

=== Group A ===
		(Belgium) Clijsters (United States) Navratilova	(France) Tauziat (France) Testud	(Spain) Martínez (Russia) Myskina	RR; W–L	Set; W–L	Game; W–L	Standings
A1	(Belgium) Kim Clijsters (United States) Martina Navratilova		6–3, 6–7^{(3–7)}, [13–11]	7–5, 6–3	2–0	4–1	26–18	1
A2	(France) Nathalie Tauziat (France) Sandrine Testud	3–6, 7–6^{(7–3)}, [11–13]		2–6, 6–4, [8–10]	0–2	2–4	18–24	3
A3	(Spain) Conchita Martínez (Russia) Anastasia Myskina	5–7, 3–6	6–2, 4–6, [10–8]		1–1	2–3	19–21	2

Standings are determined by: 1. number of wins; 2. number of matches; 3. in three-players-ties, percentage of sets won, or of games won; 4. steering-committee decision.

=== Group B ===
		(France) Bartoli (Croatia) Majoli	(United States) Davenport (United States) Fernández	(Czech Republic) Novotná (Spain) Sánchez Vicario	RR; W–L	Set; W–L	Game; W–L	Standings
B1	(France) Marion Bartoli (Croatia) Iva Majoli		3–6, 3–6	6–4, 6–2	1–1	2–2	18–18	2
B2	(United States) Lindsay Davenport (United States) Mary Joe Fernández	6–3, 6–3		6–3, 6–4	2–0	4–0	24–13	1
B3	(Czech Republic) Jana Novotná (Spain) Arantxa Sánchez Vicario	4–6, 2–6	3–6, 4–6		0–2	0–4	13–24	3

Standings are determined by: 1. number of wins; 2. number of matches; 3. in three-players-ties, percentage of sets won, or of games won; 4. steering-committee decision.
