= 2015 French Open – Men's singles =

Men's singles
- 2015 French Open

Final
- Champion: (Switzerland) Stan Wawrinka
- Runner-up: (Serbia) Novak Djokovic
- Score: 4–6, 6–4, 6–3, 6–4

Events
Singles	men	women		boys	girls
Doubles	men	women	mixed	boys	girls
WC Singles	men	women	quad
WC Doubles	men	women	quad
Legends	−45	45+	women
- French Open

Stan Wawrinka defeated Novak Djokovic in the final, 4–6, 6–4, 6–3, 6–4 to win the men's singles tennis title at the 2015 French Open. It was his first French Open title and second major title overall. As he did when he won the 2014 Australian Open, Wawrinka defeated the world No. 1 and world No. 2 (here Djokovic and Roger Federer) en route to the title. Djokovic was attempting to complete the career Grand Slam. The final was the only match Djokovic lost at the majors in 2015, as he had won the Australian Open and went on to win the Wimbledon Championships and US Open.

Rafael Nadal was the five-time defending champion, but lost to Djokovic in the quarterfinals. This was only Nadal's second career defeat at the French Open (the previous one being in 2009 to Robin Söderling) and ended his record win streak at the tournament of 39 matches. Nadal had won all six of his prior matches against Djokovic at the French Open. Nadal fell to world No. 10 in the ATP rankings after the loss, his lowest ranking since his top-10 debut on 25 April 2005 (Nadal would remain in the top 10 until 20 March 2023, a record 912 consecutive weeks).

Federer was attempting to become the first man in the Open Era to achieve the double career Grand Slam, but lost to Wawrinka in the quarterfinals.

== Seeds ==
1. (Serbia) Novak Djokovic (final)
2. (Switzerland) Roger Federer (quarterfinals)
3. (United Kingdom) Andy Murray (semifinals)
4. (Czech Republic) Tomáš Berdych (fourth round)
5. (Japan) Kei Nishikori (quarterfinals)
6. (Spain) Rafael Nadal (quarterfinals)
7. (Spain) David Ferrer (quarterfinals)
8. (Switzerland) Stan Wawrinka (champion)
9. (Croatia) Marin Čilić (fourth round)
10. (Bulgaria) Grigor Dimitrov (first round)
11. (Spain) Feliciano López (first round)
12. (France) Gilles Simon (fourth round)
13. (France) Gaël Monfils (fourth round)
14. (France) Jo-Wilfried Tsonga (semifinals)
15. (South Africa) Kevin Anderson (third round)
16. (United States) John Isner (second round)

17. (Belgium) David Goffin (third round)
18. (Spain) Tommy Robredo (second round)
19. (Spain) Roberto Bautista Agut (second round)
20. (France) Richard Gasquet (fourth round)
21. (Uruguay) Pablo Cuevas (third round)
22. (Germany) Philipp Kohlschreiber (second round)
23. (Argentina) Leonardo Mayer (third round)
24. (Latvia) Ernests Gulbis (second round)
25. (Croatia) Ivo Karlović (first round)
26. (Spain) Guillermo García-López (first round)
27. (Australia) Bernard Tomic (second round)
28. (Italy) Fabio Fognini (second round)
29. (Australia) Nick Kyrgios (third round)
30. (France) Adrian Mannarino (first round)
31. (Serbia) Viktor Troicki (second round)
32. (Spain) Fernando Verdasco (second round)

Click on the seed number of a player to go to their draw section.

== Draw ==
Key

- Q = Qualifier
- WC = Wild card
- LL = Lucky loser
- Alt = Alternate
- ITF = ITF entry
- PR = Protected ranking
- SR = Special ranking
- SE = Special exempt
- JE = Junior exempt
- JR = Junior Accelerator Programme entrant
- CO = College Accelerator Programme entrant
- NG = Next Gen Accelerator Program entrant
- w/o = Walkover
- r = Retired
- d = Defaulted

=== Finals ===
Quarterfinals
1	(Serbia) Novak Djokovic	7	6	6
6	(Spain) Rafael Nadal	5	3	1
3	(United Kingdom) Andy Murray	7^{7}	6	5	6
7	(Spain) David Ferrer	6^{4}	2	7	1
5	(Japan) Kei Nishikori	1	4	6	6	3
14	(France) Jo-Wilfried Tsonga	6	6	4	3	6
8	(Switzerland) Stan Wawrinka	6	6	7^{7}
2	(Switzerland) Roger Federer	4	3	6^{4}

Semifinals
1	(Serbia) Novak Djokovic	6	6	5	5	6
3	(United Kingdom) Andy Murray	3	3	7	7	1
14	(France) Jo-Wilfried Tsonga	3	7^{7}	6^{3}	4
8	(Switzerland) Stan Wawrinka	6	6^{1}	7^{7}	6

Final
1	(Serbia) Novak Djokovic	6	4	3	4
8	(Switzerland) Stan Wawrinka	4	6	6	6

=== Top half ===
==== Section 1 ====
First round
1	(Serbia) N Djokovic	6	7	6
(Finland) J Nieminen	2	5	2
(Luxembourg) G Müller	4	4	7^{7}	7^{7}	6
(Italy) P Lorenzi	6	6	6^{1}	6^{5}	4
Q	(Georgia (country)) N Basilashvili	6	4	6^{4}	2
WC	(Australia) T Kokkinakis	3	6	7^{7}	6
Q	(Italy) L Vanni	3	6	3	4
27	(Australia) B Tomic	6	3	6	6
20	(France) R Gasquet	6	6	6
Q	(Belgium) G Gigounon	3	4	0
Q	(Ukraine) I Marchenko	6	6	3	5	2
(Argentina) C Berlocq	4	3	6	7	6
(Slovenia) B Kavčič	7^{7}	1	1	5
(Chinese Taipei) Y-h Lu	6^{4}	6	6	7
(United States) T Smyczek	4	4	2
15	(South Africa) K Anderson	6	6	6

Second round
1	(Serbia) N Djokovic	6	6	6
(Luxembourg) G Müller	1	4	4
WC	(Australia) T Kokkinakis	3	3	6	6	8
27	(Australia) B Tomic	6	6	3	4	6
20	(France) R Gasquet	3	6	6	4	6
(Argentina) C Berlocq	6	3	1	6	1
(Chinese Taipei) Y-h Lu	7	4	4	4
15	(South Africa) K Anderson	5	6	6	6

Third round
1	(Serbia) N Djokovic	6	6	6
WC	(Australia) T Kokkinakis	4	4	4
20	(France) R Gasquet	4	7^{7}	7	6
15	(South Africa) K Anderson	6	6^{4}	5	4

Fourth round
1	(Serbia) N Djokovic	6	6	6
20	(France) R Gasquet	1	2	3

==== Section 2 ====
First round
10	(Bulgaria) G Dimitrov	6^{7}	2	3
(United States) J Sock	7^{9}	6	6
(Spain) P Carreño Busta	6	6	6
(Dominican Republic) V Estrella Burgos	3	1	0
(Croatia) B Ćorić	7^{10}	6	0	6
(United States) S Querrey	6^{8}	3	6	3
LL	(Kazakhstan) A Golubev	6	1	5	3
18	(Spain) T Robredo	3	6	7	6
30	(France) A Mannarino	6^{5}	3	6^{4}
(Austria) J Melzer	7^{7}	6	7^{7}
(Russia) A Kuznetsov	6	6	6
(Tunisia) M Jaziri	3	2	4
(Spain) N Almagro	6	2	6	7^{8}
(Ukraine) A Dolgopolov	3	6	4	6^{6}
WC	(France) Q Halys	3	3	4
6	(Spain) R Nadal	6	6	6

Second round
(United States) J Sock	6^{2}	7^{7}	6	7^{7}
(Spain) P Carreño Busta	7^{7}	6^{4}	1	6^{4}
(Croatia) B Ćorić	7	3	6	4	6
18	(Spain) T Robredo	5	6	2	6	4
(Austria) J Melzer	1	7	6^{0}	5
(Russia) A Kuznetsov	6	5	7^{7}	7
(Spain) N Almagro	4	3	1
6	(Spain) R Nadal	6	6	6

Third round
(United States) J Sock	6	6	6
(Croatia) B Ćorić	2	1	4
(Russia) A Kuznetsov	1	3	2
6	(Spain) R Nadal	6	6	6

Fourth round
(United States) J Sock	3	1	7	2
6	(Spain) R Nadal	6	6	5	6

==== Section 3 ====
First round
3	(United Kingdom) A Murray	6	6	6
LL	(Argentina) F Argüello	3	3	1
(Canada) V Pospisil	3	6^{5}	1
(Portugal) J Sousa	6	7^{7}	6
Q	(United Kingdom) K Edmund	2	6	6	5	6
Q	(France) S Robert	6	4	3	7	2
(Uzbekistan) D Istomin	3	4	3
29	(Australia) N Kyrgios	6	6	6
17	(Belgium) D Goffin	3	6	7^{7}	6
(Serbia) F Krajinović	6	2	6^{3}	1
(Colombia) S Giraldo	6	7	6
(United States) D Young	4	5	3
(France) J Chardy	4	6	6	6
Q	(Germany) M Berrer	6	3	4	4
(Italy) A Seppi	5	2	3
16	(United States) J Isner	7	6	6

Second round
3	(United Kingdom) A Murray	6	4	6	6
(Portugal) J Sousa	2	6	4	1
Q	(United Kingdom) K Edmund
29	(Australia) N Kyrgios	w/o
17	(Belgium) D Goffin	6	4	7	6
(Colombia) S Giraldo	3	6	5	2
(France) J Chardy	6	4	6	6
16	(United States) J Isner	4	6	3	3

Third round
3	(United Kingdom) A Murray	6	6	6
29	(Australia) N Kyrgios	4	2	3
17	(Belgium) D Goffin	3	4	2
(France) J Chardy	6	6	6

Fourth round
3	(United Kingdom) A Murray	6	3	6	6
(France) J Chardy	4	6	3	2

==== Section 4 ====
First round
9	(Croatia) M Čilić	6	6	6
(Netherlands) R Haase	2	4	2
(Australia) J Duckworth	6	7^{7}	6^{4}	6^{2}	0
Q	(Italy) A Arnaboldi	4	6^{5}	7^{7}	7^{7}	6
(Poland) J Janowicz	6^{4}	6	6	6
WC	(France) M Hamou	7^{7}	3	4	4
(Czech Republic) J Veselý	6	6^{6}	3	7	2
23	(Argentina) L Mayer	3	7^{8}	6	5	6
31	(Serbia) V Troicki	6	6	6^{3}	6
(Germany) J-L Struff	2	1	7^{7}	1
(Italy) S Bolelli	6	6	6
(Belgium) S Darcis	3	4	3
(Spain) D Gimeno Traver	7^{7}	6	6
(Brazil) J Souza	6^{5}	4	4
(Slovakia) L Lacko	1	3	1
7	(Spain) D Ferrer	6	6	6

Second round
9	(Croatia) M Čilić	7^{7}	6	6
Q	(Italy) A Arnaboldi	6^{3}	1	1
(Poland) J Janowicz	4	4	7^{7}	1
23	(Argentina) L Mayer	6	6	6^{1}	6
31	(Serbia) V Troicki	2	4	3
(Italy) S Bolelli	6	6	6
(Spain) D Gimeno Traver	3	2	1
7	(Spain) D Ferrer	6	6	6

Third round
9	(Croatia) M Čilić	6	6	6
23	(Argentina) L Mayer	3	2	4
(Italy) S Bolelli	3	6	7	0	1
7	(Spain) D Ferrer	6	1	5	6	6

Fourth round
9	(Croatia) M Čilić	2	2	4
7	(Spain) D Ferrer	6	6	6

=== Bottom half ===
==== Section 5 ====
First round
5	(Japan) K Nishikori	6	7	6
WC	(France) P-H Mathieu	3	5	1
(Australia) M Matosevic	1	2	4
(Brazil) T Bellucci	6	6	6
(Belgium) R Bemelmans	3	7^{7}	6	6^{4}	2
(Germany) B Becker	6	6^{5}	2	7^{7}	6
Q	(Japan) T Daniel	3	4	2
32	(Spain) F Verdasco	6	6	6
19	(Spain) R Bautista Agut	6	6	6
PR	(Germany) F Mayer	3	1	3
Q	(Sweden) E Ymer	2	6^{7}	3
(Czech Republic) L Rosol	6	7^{9}	6
(Argentina) J Mónaco	6^{4}	6	6	6^{6}	6
(Argentina) F Delbonis	7^{7}	2	1	7^{8}	2
(Russia) T Gabashvili	6	7^{11}	6
11	(Spain) F López	3	6^{9}	3

Second round
5	(Japan) K Nishikori	7	6	6
(Brazil) T Bellucci	5	4	4
(Germany) B Becker	6	0	1	7	10
32	(Spain) F Verdasco	4	6	6	5	8
19	(Spain) R Bautista Agut	4	2	2
(Czech Republic) L Rosol	6	6	6
(Argentina) J Mónaco	3	4	2
(Russia) T Gabashvili	6	6	6

Third round
5	(Japan) K Nishikori	w/o
(Germany) B Becker
(Czech Republic) L Rosol	4	4	4
(Russia) T Gabashvili	6	6	6

Fourth round
5	(Japan) K Nishikori	6	6	6
(Russia) T Gabashvili	3	4	2

==== Section 6 ====
First round
14	(France) J-W Tsonga	6	6	6
Q	(Sweden) C Lindell	1	2	2
(Kazakhstan) M Kukushkin	6^{5}	3	6^{4}
(Israel) D Sela	7^{7}	6	7^{7}
(Spain) A Ramos-Viñolas	2	4	6^{3}
(Spain) P Andújar	6	6	7^{7}
(Japan) G Soeda	1	0	2
22	(Germany) P Kohlschreiber	6	6	6
28	(Italy) F Fognini	6	6	6
(Japan) T Ito	3	2	2
Q	(Portugal) G Elias	7	3	6	4	2
(France) B Paire	5	6	4	6	6
(Croatia) I Dodig	7	3	4	1
PR	(Czech Republic) R Štěpánek	5	6	6	6
Q	(Japan) Y Nishioka	0	5	3
4	(Czech Republic) T Berdych	6	7	6

Second round
14	(France) J-W Tsonga	6	6	6
(Israel) D Sela	4	1	1
(Spain) P Andújar	6	7^{7}	3	3	6
22	(Germany) P Kohlschreiber	1	6^{5}	6	6	4
28	(Italy) F Fognini	1	3	5
(France) B Paire	6	6	7
PR	(Czech Republic) R Štěpánek	3	7^{9}	3	3
4	(Czech Republic) T Berdych	6	6^{7}	6	6

Third round
14	(France) J-W Tsonga	7^{7}	6	6
(Spain) P Andújar	6^{3}	4	3
(France) B Paire	1	7^{7}	3	4
4	(Czech Republic) T Berdych	6	6^{5}	6	6

Fourth round
14	(France) J-W Tsonga	6	6	6^{5}	6
4	(Czech Republic) T Berdych	3	2	7^{7}	3

==== Section 7 ====
First round
8	(Switzerland) S Wawrinka	6	6	6
(Turkey) M İlhan	3	2	3
(Serbia) D Lajović	6	6	6
(Argentina) M González	3	3	1
(Lithuania) R Berankis	2	5	1
(Ukraine) S Stakhovsky	6	7	6
(United States) S Johnson	6	6	6^{1}	3	6
26	(Spain) G García López	3	3	7^{7}	6	3
24	(Latvia) E Gulbis	6	6	7^{7}
Q	(Netherlands) I Sijsling	4	4	6^{3}
WC	(France) N Mahut	6	6	7^{7}
Q	(Belgium) K Coppejans	3	4	6^{4}
WC	(United States) F Tiafoe	2	1	4
(Slovakia) M Kližan	6	6	6
WC	(France) L Pouille	6	1	2	4
12	(France) G Simon	3	6	6	6

Second round
8	(Switzerland) S Wawrinka	6	6	5	6
(Serbia) D Lajović	3	4	7	3
(Ukraine) S Stakhovsky	6	3	6^{5}	6^{6}
(United States) S Johnson	2	6	7^{7}	7^{8}
24	(Latvia) E Gulbis	3	6	5	3
WC	(France) N Mahut	6	3	7	6
(Slovakia) M Kližan	5	2	3
12	(France) G Simon	7	6	6

Third round
8	(Switzerland) S Wawrinka	6	6	6
(United States) S Johnson	4	3	2
WC	(France) N Mahut	2	7^{8}	7^{8}	3	1
12	(France) G Simon	6	6^{6}	6^{6}	6	6

Fourth round
8	(Switzerland) S Wawrinka	6	6	6
12	(France) G Simon	1	4	2

==== Section 8 ====
First round
13	(France) G Monfils	6	6^{5}	6	7
WC	(France) É Roger-Vasselin	2	7^{7}	1	5
(Argentina) D Schwartzman	6	5	6	7^{7}
(Austria) A Haider-Maurer	3	7	3	6^{5}
(Austria) D Thiem	6	6	6^{6}	6
(United Kingdom) A Bedene	3	4	7^{8}	3
(Australia) S Groth	7^{7}	3	3	3
21	(Uruguay) P Cuevas	6^{5}	6	6	6
25	(Croatia) I Karlović	6^{5}	4	4
(Cyprus) M Baghdatis	7^{7}	6	6
(Bosnia and Herzegovina) D Džumhur	6	6	0
(Russia) M Youzhny	2	1	0^{r}
(Spain) M Granollers	6	6	7^{9}
Q	(Germany) M Bachinger	4	3	6^{7}
LL	(Colombia) A Falla	3	3	4
2	(Switzerland) R Federer	6	6	6

Second round
13	(France) G Monfils	4	6	4	6	6
(Argentina) D Schwartzman	6	4	6	2	3
(Austria) D Thiem	6^{7}	5	7^{7}	5
21	(Uruguay) P Cuevas	7^{9}	7	6^{5}	7
(Cyprus) M Baghdatis	4	3	6	2
(Bosnia and Herzegovina) D Džumhur	6	6	4	6
(Spain) M Granollers	2	6^{1}	3
2	(Switzerland) R Federer	6	7^{7}	6

Third round
13	(France) G Monfils	4	7^{7}	3	6	6
21	(Uruguay) P Cuevas	6	6^{1}	6	4	3
(Bosnia and Herzegovina) D Džumhur	4	3	2
2	(Switzerland) R Federer	6	6	6

Fourth round
13	(France) G Monfils	3	6	4	1
2	(Switzerland) R Federer	6	4	6	6

Preceded by 2015 Australian Open – Men's singles	Grand Slam men's singles	Succeeded by 2015 Wimbledon Championships – Men's singles
