= 2015 French Open – Women's doubles =

Women's doubles
- 2015 French Open

Final
- Champions: (United States) Bethanie Mattek-Sands (Czech Republic) Lucie Šafářová
- Runners-up: (Australia) Casey Dellacqua (Kazakhstan) Yaroslava Shvedova
- Score: 3–6, 6–4, 6–2

Details
- Draw: 64 (7 WC )
- Seeds: 16

Events
Singles	men	women		boys	girls
Doubles	men	women	mixed	boys	girls
WC Singles	men	women	quad
WC Doubles	men	women	quad
Legends	−45	45+	women
← 2014 ·	French Open	· 2016 →

Hsieh Su-wei and Peng Shuai were the defending champions, but Peng chose not to participate this year. Hsieh played alongside Flavia Pennetta, but lost in the quarterfinals to Andrea Hlaváčková and Lucie Hradecká.

Bethanie Mattek-Sands and Lucie Šafářová won their second consecutive Grand Slam title, defeating Casey Dellacqua and Yaroslava Shvedova in the final, 3–6, 6–4, 6–2.

== Seeds ==
1. (Switzerland) Martina Hingis / (India) Sania Mirza (quarterfinals)
2. (Russia) Ekaterina Makarova / (Russia) Elena Vesnina (semifinals)
3. (Hungary) Tímea Babos / (France) Kristina Mladenovic (second round)
4. (Chinese Taipei) Hsieh Su-wei / (Italy) Flavia Pennetta (quarterfinals)
5. (Spain) Garbiñe Muguruza / (Spain) Carla Suárez Navarro (first round)
6. (United States) Raquel Kops-Jones / (United States) Abigail Spears (first round)
7. (United States) Bethanie Mattek-Sands / (Czech Republic) Lucie Šafářová (champions)
8. (France) Caroline Garcia / (Slovenia) Katarina Srebotnik (third round)
9. (Czech Republic) Andrea Hlaváčková / (Czech Republic) Lucie Hradecká (semifinals)
10. (Russia) Alla Kudryavtseva / (Russia) Anastasia Pavlyuchenkova (second round)
11. (Chinese Taipei) Chan Yung-jan / (China) Zheng Jie (third round)
12. (Australia) Casey Dellacqua / (Kazakhstan) Yaroslava Shvedova (final)
13. (Netherlands) Michaëlla Krajicek / (Czech Republic) Barbora Strýcová (quarterfinals)
14. (Italy) Karin Knapp / (Italy) Roberta Vinci (third round)
15. (Australia) Anastasia Rodionova / (Australia) Arina Rodionova (third round)
16. (Poland) Klaudia Jans-Ignacik / (Slovenia) Andreja Klepač (first round)

== Draw ==
=== Key ===
- Q = Qualifier
- WC = Wild card
- LL = Lucky loser
- Alt = Alternate
- ITF = ITF entry
- PR = Protected ranking
- SR = Special ranking
- SE = Special exempt
- JE = Junior exempt
- JR = Junior Accelerator Programme entrant
- CO = College Accelerator Programme entrant
- NG = Next Gen Accelerator Program entrant
- w/o = Walkover
- r = Retired
- d = Defaulted

=== Finals ===
Quarterfinals
1	(Switzerland) Martina Hingis (India) Sania Mirza	5	2
7	(United States) Bethanie Mattek-Sands (Czech Republic) Lucie Šafářová	7	6
4	(Chinese Taipei) Hsieh Su-wei (Italy) Flavia Pennetta	5	6	5
9	(Czech Republic) Andrea Hlaváčková (Czech Republic) Lucie Hradecká	7	3	7
12	(Australia) Casey Dellacqua (Kazakhstan) Yaroslava Shvedova	6	7
13	(Netherlands) Michaëlla Krajicek (Czech Republic) Barbora Strýcová	3	5
(Spain) Sílvia Soler Espinosa (Spain) María Teresa Torró Flor	1	6^{5}
2	(Russia) Ekaterina Makarova (Russia) Elena Vesnina	6	7^{7}

Semifinals
7	(United States) Bethanie Mattek-Sands (Czech Republic) Lucie Šafářová	6	5	6
9	(Czech Republic) Andrea Hlaváčková (Czech Republic) Lucie Hradecká	2	7	4
12	(Australia) Casey Dellacqua (Kazakhstan) Yaroslava Shvedova	6	6
2	(Russia) Ekaterina Makarova (Russia) Elena Vesnina	3	2

Final
7	(United States) Bethanie Mattek-Sands (Czech Republic) Lucie Šafářová	3	6	6
12	(Australia) Casey Dellacqua (Kazakhstan) Yaroslava Shvedova	6	4	2

=== Top half ===
==== Section 1 ====
First round
1	(Switzerland) M Hingis (India) S Mirza	6	6
(Germany) J Görges (Czech Republic) B Krejčíková	3	0
PR	(Romania) E Bogdan (Czech Republic) V Uhlířová	5	4
WC	(France) S Foretz (France) A Hesse	7	6
(Croatia) P Martić (United States) C Vandeweghe	3	3
(Germany) A-L Grönefeld (Russia) A Panova	6	6
WC	(France) A Lim (France) L Thorpe	4	3
14	(Italy) K Knapp (Italy) R Vinci	6	6
10	(Russia) A Kudryavtseva (Russia) A Pavlyuchenkova	7	7
(Germany) S Lisicki (Germany) A Petkovic	5	5
(Puerto Rico) M Puig (United States) S Rogers	2	1
(Switzerland) B Bencic (Czech Republic) K Siniaková	6	6
(United States) V Lepchenko (China) S Zheng	7^{7}	7
(United States) C McHale (Japan) K Nara	6^{4}	5
WC	(France) I Ramialison (France) C Sibille	1	6^{1}
7	(United States) B Mattek-Sands (Czech Republic) L Šafářová	6	7^{7}

Second round
1	(Switzerland) M Hingis (India) S Mirza	6	6
WC	(France) S Foretz (France) A Hesse	3	4
(Germany) A-L Grönefeld (Russia) A Panova	4	6	0
14	(Italy) K Knapp (Italy) R Vinci	6	3	6
10	(Russia) A Kudryavtseva (Russia) A Pavlyuchenkova	4	5
(Switzerland) B Bencic (Czech Republic) K Siniaková	6	7
(United States) V Lepchenko (China) S Zheng	3	2
7	(United States) B Mattek-Sands (Czech Republic) L Šafářová	6	6

Third round
1	(Switzerland) M Hingis (India) S Mirza	6	6
14	(Italy) K Knapp (Italy) R Vinci	1	4
(Switzerland) B Bencic (Czech Republic) K Siniaková	4	3
7	(United States) B Mattek-Sands (Czech Republic) L Šafářová	6	6

Quarterfinals
1	(Switzerland) M Hingis (India) S Mirza	5	2
7	(United States) B Mattek-Sands (Czech Republic) L Šafářová	7	6

==== Section 2 ====
First round
4	(Chinese Taipei) S-w Hsieh (Italy) F Pennetta	6^{6}	6	6
WC	(France) C de Bernardi (France) S Reix	7^{8}	2	1
(United States) M Brengle (Germany) T Maria	6	6
Alt	(China) Y Wang (Belgium) Y Wickmayer	3	4
(Australia) J Gajdošová (Australia) A Tomljanović	3	6^{5}
(Czech Republic) Ka Plíšková (Czech Republic) Kr Plíšková	6	7^{7}
PR	(Slovakia) J Husárová (Poland) P Kania	7^{7}	7^{7}
16	(Poland) K Jans-Ignacik (Slovenia) A Klepač	6^{5}	6^{3}
9	(Czech Republic) A Hlaváčková (Czech Republic) L Hradecká	6	6
PR	(Russia) V Dushevina (Spain) MJ Martínez Sánchez	3	4
(Switzerland) T Bacsinszky (Chinese Taipei) C-j Chuang	6	6
(Romania) M Niculescu (Spain) A Parra Santonja	4	3
(Chinese Taipei) H-c Chan (Spain) A Medina Garrigues	6	6
(Serbia) A Krunić (Ukraine) L Tsurenko	3	1
(Belgium) Y Bonaventure (Slovakia) AK Schmiedlová	6	6
6	(United States) R Kops-Jones (United States) A Spears	1	4

Second round
4	(Chinese Taipei) S-w Hsieh (Italy) F Pennetta	6	6
(United States) M Brengle (Germany) T Maria	1	3
(Czech Republic) Ka Plíšková (Czech Republic) Kr Plíšková	2	1
PR	(Slovakia) J Husárová (Poland) P Kania	6	6
9	(Czech Republic) A Hlaváčková (Czech Republic) L Hradecká	4	7	6
(Switzerland) T Bacsinszky (Chinese Taipei) C-j Chuang	6	5	4
(Chinese Taipei) H-c Chan (Spain) A Medina Garrigues	6	5	6
(Belgium) Y Bonaventure (Slovakia) AK Schmiedlová	3	7	3

Third round
4	(Chinese Taipei) S-w Hsieh (Italy) F Pennetta	6	7
PR	(Slovakia) J Husárová (Poland) P Kania	3	5
9	(Czech Republic) A Hlaváčková (Czech Republic) L Hradecká	7^{7}	6
(Chinese Taipei) H-c Chan (Spain) A Medina Garrigues	6^{5}	2

Quarterfinals
4	(Chinese Taipei) S-w Hsieh (Italy) F Pennetta	5	6	5
9	(Czech Republic) A Hlaváčková (Czech Republic) L Hradecká	7	3	7

=== Bottom half ===
==== Section 3 ====
First round
8	(France) C Garcia (Slovenia) K Srebotnik	6	6
(Serbia) B Jovanovski (China) C Liang	2	2
(Spain) L Arruabarrena (Romania) I-C Begu	6	6
WC	(France) M Arcangioli (France) C Paquet	2	0
(Japan) S Aoyama (Czech Republic) R Voráčová	7^{7}	5	2
(France) A Cornet (Poland) M Linette	6^{1}	7	6
(Chinese Taipei) C-w Chan (United States) L Davis	1	2
12	(Australia) C Dellacqua (Kazakhstan) Y Shvedova	6	6
13	(Netherlands) M Krajicek (Czech Republic) B Strýcová	7^{7}	6
WC	(France) J Coin (France) P Parmentier	6^{3}	0
PR	(Czech Republic) D Allertová (Czech Republic) P Cetkovská	6	6^{8}	1
(Japan) K Date-Krumm (Italy) F Schiavone	2	7^{10}	6
(Georgia (country)) O Kalashnikova (Bulgaria) T Pironkova	2	5
(Slovakia) D Hantuchová (Australia) S Stosur	6	7
(New Zealand) M Erakovic (United Kingdom) H Watson	4	6^{2}
3	(Hungary) T Babos (France) K Mladenovic	6	7^{7}

Second round
8	(France) C Garcia (Slovenia) K Srebotnik	7^{7}	6
(Spain) L Arruabarrena (Romania) I-C Begu	6^{1}	4
(France) A Cornet (Poland) M Linette	2	1
12	(Australia) C Dellacqua (Kazakhstan) Y Shvedova	6	6
13	(Netherlands) M Krajicek (Czech Republic) B Strýcová	7^{7}	6
(Japan) K Date-Krumm (Italy) F Schiavone	6^{5}	1
(Slovakia) D Hantuchová (Australia) S Stosur	7	6
3	(Hungary) T Babos (France) K Mladenovic	5	3

Third round
8	(France) C Garcia (Slovenia) K Srebotnik	1	1
12	(Australia) C Dellacqua (Kazakhstan) Y Shvedova	6	6
13	(Netherlands) M Krajicek (Czech Republic) B Strýcová	6	3	6
(Slovakia) D Hantuchová (Australia) S Stosur	4	6	2

Quarterfinals
12	(Australia) C Dellacqua (Kazakhstan) Y Shvedova	6	7
13	(Netherlands) M Krajicek (Czech Republic) B Strýcová	3	5

==== Section 4 ====
First round
5	(Spain) G Muguruza (Spain) C Suárez Navarro	0	4
(Spain) S Soler Espinosa (Spain) MT Torró Flor	6	6
(Romania) A Dulgheru (Slovakia) M Rybáriková	6	4	6
(Germany) M Barthel (Luxembourg) M Minella	3	6	3
(Czech Republic) K Koukalová (Czech Republic) T Smitková	5	4
Alt	(Germany) A Beck (Israel) S Pe'er	7	6
(Canada) G Dabrowski (Poland) A Rosolska	4	1
11	(Chinese Taipei) Y-j Chan (China) J Zheng	6	6
15	(Australia) An Rodionova (Australia) Ar Rodionova	6	6
(Croatia) D Jurak (United States) A Riske	3	2
(Kazakhstan) Z Diyas (China) Y Xu	5	7^{7}	6
(Ukraine) N Kichenok (Romania) R Olaru	7	6^{5}	4
(Netherlands) K Bertens (Sweden) J Larsson	4	6^{5}
(Ukraine) L Kichenok (Ukraine) O Savchuk	6	7^{7}
WC	(France) M Johansson (France) V Razzano	2	1
2	(Russia) E Makarova (Russia) E Vesnina	6	6

Second round
(Spain) S Soler Espinosa (Spain) MT Torró Flor	6	6
(Romania) A Dulgheru (Slovakia) M Rybáriková	1	0
Alt	(Germany) A Beck (Israel) S Pe'er	3	2
11	(Chinese Taipei) Y-j Chan (China) J Zheng	6	6
15	(Australia) An Rodionova (Australia) Ar Rodionova	6^{5}	6	7^{7}
(Kazakhstan) Z Diyas (China) Y Xu	7^{7}	3	6^{3}
(Ukraine) L Kichenok (Ukraine) O Savchuk	5	7^{7}	3
2	(Russia) E Makarova (Russia) E Vesnina	7	6^{3}	6

Third round
(Spain) S Soler Espinosa (Spain) MT Torró Flor	4	6	7^{8}
11	(Chinese Taipei) Y-j Chan (China) J Zheng	6	4	6^{6}
15	(Australia) An Rodionova (Australia) Ar Rodionova	0	6	2
2	(Russia) E Makarova (Russia) E Vesnina	6	3	6

Quarterfinals
(Spain) S Soler Espinosa (Spain) MT Torró Flor	1	6^{5}
2	(Russia) E Makarova (Russia) E Vesnina	6	7^{7}
