= 2015 French Open – Women's singles =

Women's singles
- 2015 French Open

Final
- Champion: (United States) Serena Williams
- Runner-up: (Czech Republic) Lucie Šafářová
- Score: 6–3, 6–7^{(2–7)}, 6–2

Details
- Draw: 128 (12 Q / 8 WC )
- Seeds: 32

Events
Singles	men	women		boys	girls
Doubles	men	women	mixed	boys	girls
WC Singles	men	women	quad
WC Doubles	men	women	quad
Legends	−45	45+	women
← 2014 ·	French Open	· 2016 →

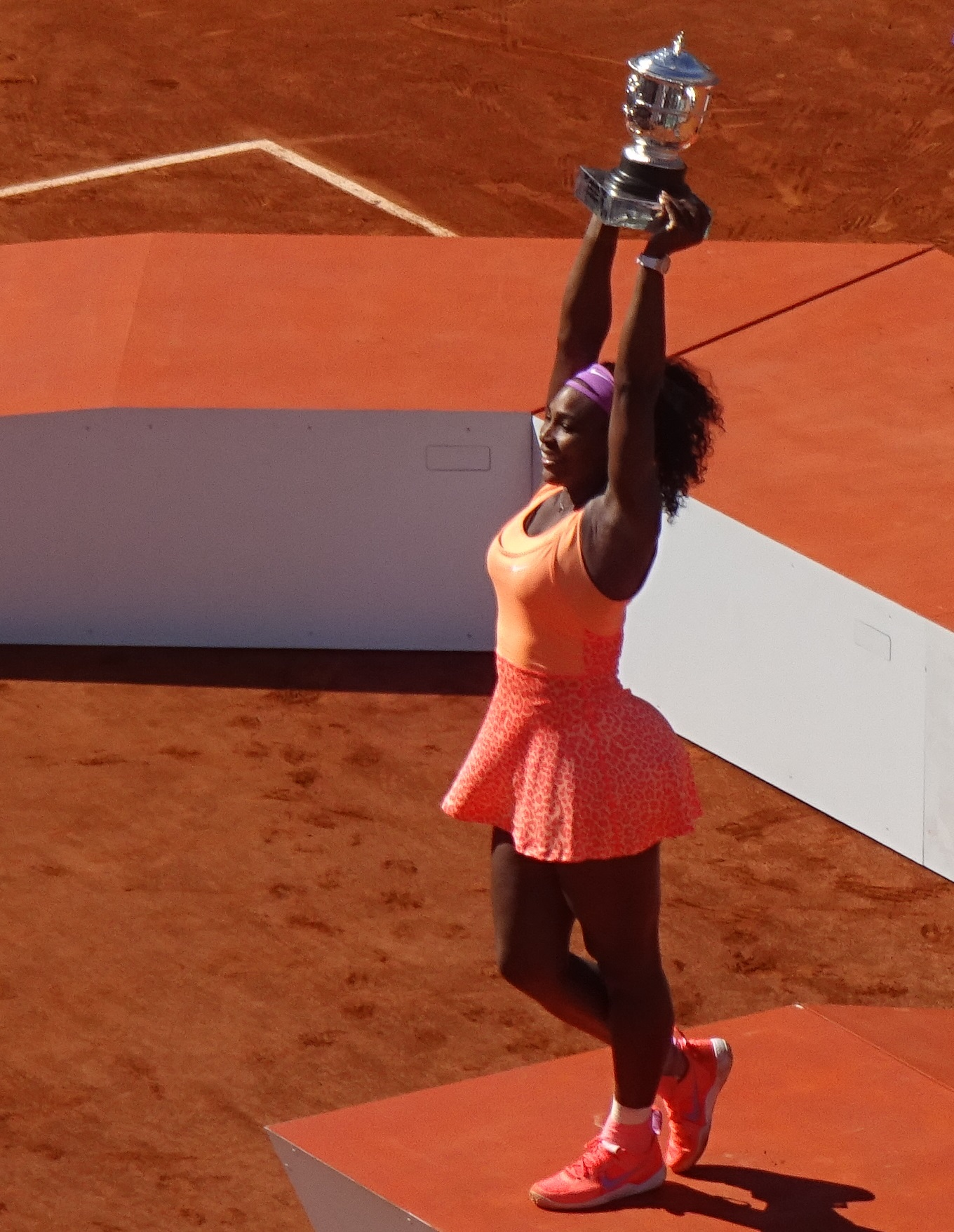
Serena Williams holding the trophy

Serena Williams defeated Lucie Šafářová in the final, 6–3, 6–7^{(2–7)}, 6–2 to win the women's singles tennis title at the 2015 French Open. It was her third French Open title, 20th major singles title overall, and she completed the triple career Grand Slam in singles with the win. Williams would later describe the victory as the proudest moment in her career; she suffered from influenza during the tournament.

Maria Sharapova was the defending champion, but lost in the fourth round to Šafářová.

2008 champion Ana Ivanovic reached her first major semifinal since winning the title seven years previously; it was also her last major semifinal.

== Seeds ==
1. (United States) Serena Williams (champion)
2. (Russia) Maria Sharapova (fourth round)
3. (Romania) Simona Halep (second round)
4. (Czech Republic) Petra Kvitová (fourth round)
5. (Denmark) Caroline Wozniacki (second round)
6. (Canada) Eugenie Bouchard (first round)
7. (Serbia) Ana Ivanovic (semifinals)
8. (Spain) Carla Suárez Navarro (third round)
9. (Russia) Ekaterina Makarova (fourth round)
10. (Germany) Andrea Petkovic (third round)
11. (Germany) Angelique Kerber (third round)
12. (Czech Republic) Karolína Plíšková (second round)
13. (Czech Republic) Lucie Šafářová (final)
14. (Poland) Agnieszka Radwańska (first round)
15. (United States) Venus Williams (first round)
16. (United States) Madison Keys (third round)

17. (Italy) Sara Errani (quarterfinals)
18. (Russia) Svetlana Kuznetsova (second round)
19. (Ukraine) Elina Svitolina (quarterfinals)
20. (Germany) Sabine Lisicki (third round)
21. (Spain) Garbiñe Muguruza (quarterfinals)
22. (Czech Republic) Barbora Strýcová (first round)
23. (Switzerland) Timea Bacsinszky (semifinals)
24. (China) Peng Shuai (first round, retired)
25. (Serbia) Jelena Janković (first round)
26. (Australia) Samantha Stosur (third round)
27. (Belarus) Victoria Azarenka (third round)
28. (Italy) Flavia Pennetta (fourth round)
29. (France) Alizé Cornet (fourth round)
30. (Romania) Irina-Camelia Begu (third round)
31. (France) Caroline Garcia (first round)
32. (Kazakhstan) Zarina Diyas (second round)

Click on the seed number of a player to go to their draw section.

== Draw ==
=== Key ===
- Q = Qualifier
- WC = Wild card
- LL = Lucky loser
- Alt = Alternate
- ITF = ITF entry
- PR = Protected ranking
- SR = Special ranking
- SE = Special exempt
- JE = Junior exempt
- JR = Junior Accelerator Programme entrant
- CO = College Accelerator Programme entrant
- NG = Next Gen Accelerator Program entrant
- w/o = Walkover
- r = Retired
- d = Defaulted

=== Finals ===
Quarterfinals
1	(United States) Serena Williams	6	6
17	(Italy) Sara Errani	1	3
23	(Switzerland) Timea Bacsinszky	6	7
(Belgium) Alison Van Uytvanck	4	5
7	(Serbia) Ana Ivanovic	6	6
19	(Ukraine) Elina Svitolina	3	2
21	(Spain) Garbiñe Muguruza	6^{3}	3
13	(Czech Republic) Lucie Šafářová	7^{7}	6

Semifinals
1	(United States) Serena Williams	4	6	6
23	(Switzerland) Timea Bacsinszky	6	3	0
7	(Serbia) Ana Ivanovic	5	5
13	(Czech Republic) Lucie Šafářová	7	7

Final
1	(United States) Serena Williams	6	6^{2}	6
13	(Czech Republic) Lucie Šafářová	3	7^{7}	2

=== Top half ===
==== Section 1 ====
First round
1	(United States) S Williams	6	6
Q	(Czech Republic) A Hlaváčková	2	3
(Germany) A-L Friedsam	6	4	6
Q	(United States) A Glatch	2	6	4
(China) S Zheng	3	0
(Czech Republic) L Hradecká	6	6
(Spain) MT Torró Flor	2	1
27	(Belarus) V Azarenka	6	6
22	(Czech Republic) B Strýcová	6^{5}	2
(Bulgaria) T Pironkova	7^{7}	6
(Czech Republic) D Allertová	7^{19}	4	6
Q	(United Kingdom) J Konta	6^{17}	6	2
WC	(France) M Johansson	4	5
(United Kingdom) H Watson	6	7
(United States) S Stephens	7^{7}	6
15	(United States) V Williams	6^{5}	1

Second round
1	(United States) S Williams	5	6	6
(Germany) A-L Friedsam	7	3	3
(Czech Republic) L Hradecká	2	3
27	(Belarus) V Azarenka	6	6
(Bulgaria) T Pironkova	6	7^{7}
(Czech Republic) D Allertová	3	6^{2}
(United Kingdom) H Watson	2	4
(United States) S Stephens	6	6

Third round
1	(United States) S Williams	3	6	6
27	(Belarus) V Azarenka	6	4	2
(Bulgaria) T Pironkova	4	1
(United States) S Stephens	6	6

Fourth round
1	(United States) S Williams	1	7	6
(United States) S Stephens	6	5	3

==== Section 2 ====
First round
10	(Germany) A Petkovic	6	6
(United States) S Rogers	2	1
Q	(Spain) L Domínguez Lino	3	7^{7}	6
(United States) C McHale	6	6^{4}	4
(Germany) C Witthöft	6	7
(Czech Republic) K Siniaková	3	5
(United States) A Riske	6^{1}	6	0
17	(Italy) S Errani	7^{7}	2	6
25	(Serbia) J Janković	3	4
Q	(Bulgaria) S Karatantcheva	6	6
(United States) I Falconi	6	6
WC	(France) M Arcangioli	2	0
(United States) C Vandeweghe	2	7	1
(Germany) J Görges	6	5	6
(Italy) K Knapp	3	0
5	(Denmark) C Wozniacki	6	6

Second round
10	(Germany) A Petkovic	4	6	6
Q	(Spain) L Domínguez Lino	6	4	4
(Germany) C Witthöft	3	6	2
17	(Italy) S Errani	6	4	6
Q	(Bulgaria) S Karatantcheva	6	1	2
(United States) I Falconi	3	6	6
(Germany) J Görges	6	7^{7}
5	(Denmark) C Wozniacki	4	6^{4}

Third round
10	(Germany) A Petkovic	3	3
17	(Italy) S Errani	6	6
(United States) I Falconi	4	1
(Germany) J Görges	6	6

Fourth round
17	(Italy) S Errani	6	6
(Germany) J Görges	2	2

==== Section 3 ====
First round
4	(Czech Republic) P Kvitová	6	3	6
(New Zealand) M Erakovic	4	6	4
(Spain) S Soler Espinosa	6	6
(France) P Parmentier	4	3
Q	(Russia) M Gasparyan	1	4
(Croatia) A Konjuh	6	6
PR	(United States) B Mattek-Sands	4	6^{6}
30	(Romania) I-C Begu	6	7^{8}
23	(Switzerland) T Bacsinszky	6	6
(Spain) L Arruabarrena	3	4
(Czech Republic) T Smitková	6	6
(United States) T Townsend	3	4
(Switzerland) B Bencic	6	6
(Slovakia) D Hantuchová	3	3
(United States) V Lepchenko	6^{3}	3
16	(United States) M Keys	7^{7}	6

Second round
4	(Czech Republic) P Kvitová	6^{4}	6	6
(Spain) S Soler Espinosa	7^{7}	4	2
(Croatia) A Konjuh	2	0
30	(Romania) I-C Begu	6	6
23	(Switzerland) T Bacsinszky	6	6
(Czech Republic) T Smitková	2	0
(Switzerland) B Bencic	0	3
16	(United States) M Keys	6	6

Third round
4	(Czech Republic) P Kvitová	6	6
30	(Romania) I-C Begu	3	2
23	(Switzerland) T Bacsinszky	6	6
16	(United States) M Keys	4	2

Fourth round
4	(Czech Republic) P Kvitová	6	0	3
23	(Switzerland) T Bacsinszky	2	6	6

==== Section 4 ====
First round
12	(Czech Republic) Ka Plíšková	7^{7}	6
(China) S Zhang	6^{4}	4
(Romania) A Mitu	6	6
WC	(France) A Lim	3	2
(China) Q Wang	6	3	4
(Italy) F Schiavone	3	6	6
(Netherlands) K Bertens	1	6	2
18	(Russia) S Kuznetsova	6	4	6
32	(Kazakhstan) Z Diyas	6	6
Q	(Germany) D Pfizenmaier	4	1
(Slovakia) AK Schmiedlová	6^{4}	6^{7}
(Belgium) A Van Uytvanck	7^{7}	7^{9}
(Czech Republic) K Koukalová	3	6^{4}
(Montenegro) D Kovinić	6	7^{7}
(France) K Mladenovic	6	6
6	(Canada) E Bouchard	4	4

Second round
12	(Czech Republic) Ka Plíšková	6	6^{5}	4
(Romania) A Mitu	2	7^{7}	6
(Italy) F Schiavone	6^{11}	7	10
18	(Russia) S Kuznetsova	7^{13}	5	8
32	(Kazakhstan) Z Diyas	6	1	4
(Belgium) A Van Uytvanck	0	6	6
(Montenegro) D Kovinić	3	5
(France) K Mladenovic	6	7

Third round
(Romania) A Mitu	7	6
(Italy) F Schiavone	5	4
(Belgium) A Van Uytvanck	6	6
(France) K Mladenovic	4	1

Fourth round
(Romania) A Mitu	1	3
(Belgium) A Van Uytvanck	6	6

=== Bottom half ===
==== Section 5 ====
First round
7	(Serbia) A Ivanovic	4	6	6
(Kazakhstan) Y Shvedova	6	2	0
(Czech Republic) P Cetkovská	3	2
(Japan) M Doi	6	6
(Serbia) B Jovanovski	1	6	6
(Ukraine) L Tsurenko	6	1	0
(Croatia) D Vekić	3	6	6
31	(France) C Garcia	6	3	2
24	(China) S Peng	0	0^{r}
(Slovenia) P Hercog	6	2
(Belgium) K Flipkens	6	3	3
(Russia) E Vesnina	2	6	6
WC	(France) F Ferro	3	2
Q	(Brazil) T Pereira	6	6
WC	(United States) L Chirico	4	2
9	(Russia) E Makarova	6	6

Second round
7	(Serbia) A Ivanovic	3	6	6
(Japan) M Doi	6	3	4
(Serbia) B Jovanovski	4	3
(Croatia) D Vekić	6	6
(Slovenia) P Hercog	6	1	3
(Russia) E Vesnina	2	6	6
Q	(Brazil) T Pereira	2	7	3
9	(Russia) E Makarova	6	5	6

Third round
7	(Serbia) A Ivanovic	6	6
(Croatia) D Vekić	0	3
(Russia) E Vesnina	2	4
9	(Russia) E Makarova	6	6

Fourth round
7	(Serbia) A Ivanovic	7	3	6
9	(Russia) E Makarova	5	6	1

==== Section 6 ====
First round
14	(Poland) A Radwańska	2	6	1
(Germany) A Beck	6	3	6
Q	(Poland) P Kania	5	6	6
(Germany) M Barthel	7	2	4
(Serbia) A Krunić	6	3	3
(Kazakhstan) Y Putintseva	3	6	6
(Belgium) Y Wickmayer	2	2
19	(Ukraine) E Svitolina	6	6
29	(France) A Cornet	4	6	6
(Italy) R Vinci	6	4	1
(Romania) A Dulgheru	6	6
(United States) N Gibbs	3	1
(Croatia) M Lučić-Baroni	6	3	6
(United States) L Davis	3	6	3
(Russia) E Rodina	5	4
3	(Romania) S Halep	7	6

Second round
(Germany) A Beck	6	6
Q	(Poland) P Kania	2	2
(Kazakhstan) Y Putintseva	6	5	7
19	(Ukraine) E Svitolina	1	7	9
29	(France) A Cornet	6	7
(Romania) A Dulgheru	2	5
(Croatia) M Lučić-Baroni	7	6
3	(Romania) S Halep	5	1

Third round
(Germany) A Beck	3	6	4
19	(Ukraine) E Svitolina	6	2	6
29	(France) A Cornet	4	6	7
(Croatia) M Lučić-Baroni	6	3	5

Fourth round
19	(Ukraine) E Svitolina	6	7^{11}
29	(France) A Cornet	2	6^{9}

==== Section 7 ====
First round
8	(Spain) C Suárez Navarro	6	6
(Romania) M Niculescu	2	2
WC	(France) V Razzano	2	6	6
Q	(Paraguay) V Cepede Royg	6	4	2
(Slovakia) M Rybáriková	0	7	6
Q	(Australia) O Rogowska	6	5	2
(Poland) M Linette	3	7	1
28	(Italy) F Pennetta	6	5	6
21	(Spain) G Muguruza	6	7
Q	(Croatia) P Martić	2	5
(Germany) T Maria	5	3
(Italy) C Giorgi	7	6
(Australia) C Dellacqua	2	2
(Australia) A Tomljanović	6	6
(Hungary) T Babos	0	1
11	(Germany) A Kerber	6	6

Second round
8	(Spain) C Suárez Navarro	6	1
WC	(France) V Razzano	3	0^{r}
(Slovakia) M Rybáriková	2	0
28	(Italy) F Pennetta	6	6
21	(Spain) G Muguruza	6	6
(Italy) C Giorgi	1	4
(Australia) A Tomljanović	3	2
11	(Germany) A Kerber	6	6

Third round
8	(Spain) C Suárez Navarro	3	4
28	(Italy) F Pennetta	6	6
21	(Spain) G Muguruza	4	6	6
11	(Germany) A Kerber	6	2	2

Fourth round
28	(Italy) F Pennetta	3	4
21	(Spain) G Muguruza	6	6

==== Section 8 ====
First round
13	(Czech Republic) L Šafářová	7^{8}	7^{11}
(Russia) A Pavlyuchenkova	6^{6}	6^{9}
WC	(France) O Dodin	6	5	1
(Japan) K Nara	3	7	6
(Sweden) J Larsson	1	6^{3}
(Australia) D Gavrilova	6	7^{7}
(Puerto Rico) M Puig	3	2
20	(Germany) S Lisicki	6	6
26	(Australia) S Stosur	6	6
(United States) M Brengle	1	3
WC	(France) A Hesse	2	6	6
(Australia) J Gajdošová	6	3	2
(Switzerland) S Vögele	6	3	2
(Russia) V Diatchenko	4	6	6
(Estonia) K Kanepi	2	4
2	(Russia) M Sharapova	6	6

Second round
13	(Czech Republic) L Šafářová	6	6
(Japan) K Nara	2	0
(Australia) D Gavrilova	1	0^{r}
20	(Germany) S Lisicki	6	0
26	(Australia) S Stosur	6	6
WC	(France) A Hesse	0	1
(Russia) V Diatchenko	3	1
2	(Russia) M Sharapova	6	6

Third round
13	(Czech Republic) L Šafářová	6	7^{7}
20	(Germany) S Lisicki	3	6^{2}
26	(Australia) S Stosur	3	4
2	(Russia) M Sharapova	6	6

Fourth round
13	(Czech Republic) L Šafářová	7^{7}	6
2	(Russia) M Sharapova	6^{3}	4

== Championship match statistics ==
Category	(United States) S. Williams	(Czech Republic) Šafářová
1st serve %	47/83 (57%)	67/93 (72%)
1st serve points won	36 of 47 = 77%	38 of 67 = 57%
2nd serve points won	16 of 36 = 44%	11 of 26 = 42%
Total service points won	52 of 83 = 62.65%	49 of 93 = 52.69%
Aces	11	2
Double faults	9	1
Winners	19	13
Unforced errors	33	25
Net points won	3 of 4 = 75%	2 of 2 = 100%
Break points converted	7 of 11 = 64%	4 of 4 = 100%
Return points won	44 of 93 = 47%	31 of 83 = 37%
Total points won	96	80

Preceded by 2015 Australian Open – Women's singles	Grand Slam women's singles	Succeeded by 2015 Wimbledon Championships – Women's singles
