= 2015 French Open =

Tennis tournament held in Paris

- Date: 24 May – 7 June 2015
- Edition: 114
- Category: Grand Slam (ITF)
- Draw: 128S/64D/32X
- Prize money: €28,028,600
- Surface: Clay
- Location: Paris (XVI^{e}), France
- Venue: Stade Roland Garros

Champions

Men's singles
- (Switzerland) Stanislas Wawrinka

Women's singles
- (United States) Serena Williams

Men's doubles
- (Croatia) Ivan Dodig / (Brazil) Marcelo Melo

Women's doubles
- (United States) Bethanie Mattek-Sands / (Czech Republic) Lucie Šafářová

Mixed doubles
- (United States) Bethanie Mattek-Sands / (United States) Mike Bryan

Wheelchair men's singles
- (Japan) Shingo Kunieda

Wheelchair women's singles
- (Netherlands) Jiske Griffioen

Wheelchair men's doubles
- (Japan) Shingo Kunieda / (United Kingdom) Gordon Reid

Wheelchair women's doubles
- (Netherlands) Jiske Griffioen / (Netherlands) Aniek van Koot

Boys' singles
- (United States) Tommy Paul

Girls' singles
- (Spain) Paula Badosa Gibert

Boys' doubles
- (Spain) Álvaro López San Martín / (Spain) Jaume Munar

Girls' doubles
- (Czech Republic) Miriam Kolodziejová / (Czech Republic) Markéta Vondroušová

Legends under 45 doubles
- (Spain) Juan Carlos Ferrero / (Spain) Carlos Moyá

Women's legends doubles
- (Belgium) Kim Clijsters / (United States) Martina Navratilova

Legends over 45 doubles
- (France) Guy Forget / (France) Henri Leconte
- French Open

The 2015 French Open was a tennis tournament played on outdoor clay courts. It was the 114th edition of the French Open and the second Grand Slam event of the year. It took place at the Stade Roland Garros from 24 May to 7 June and consisted of events for professional players in singles, doubles and mixed doubles play. Junior and wheelchair players also took part in singles and doubles events.

Rafael Nadal was the five-time defending champion in the Men's Singles, but lost to Novak Djokovic in the quarter finals. Stan Wawrinka won his first French Open title, defeating Djokovic in the final. Maria Sharapova was defending the Women's Singles title, but lost to Lucie Šafářová in the fourth round. Serena Williams defeated Šafářová in the final and won her third French Open title, 20th Grand Slam singles title, and third Career Grand Slam (joining Steffi Graf as the only two women in the Open Era to do so).

== Tournament ==
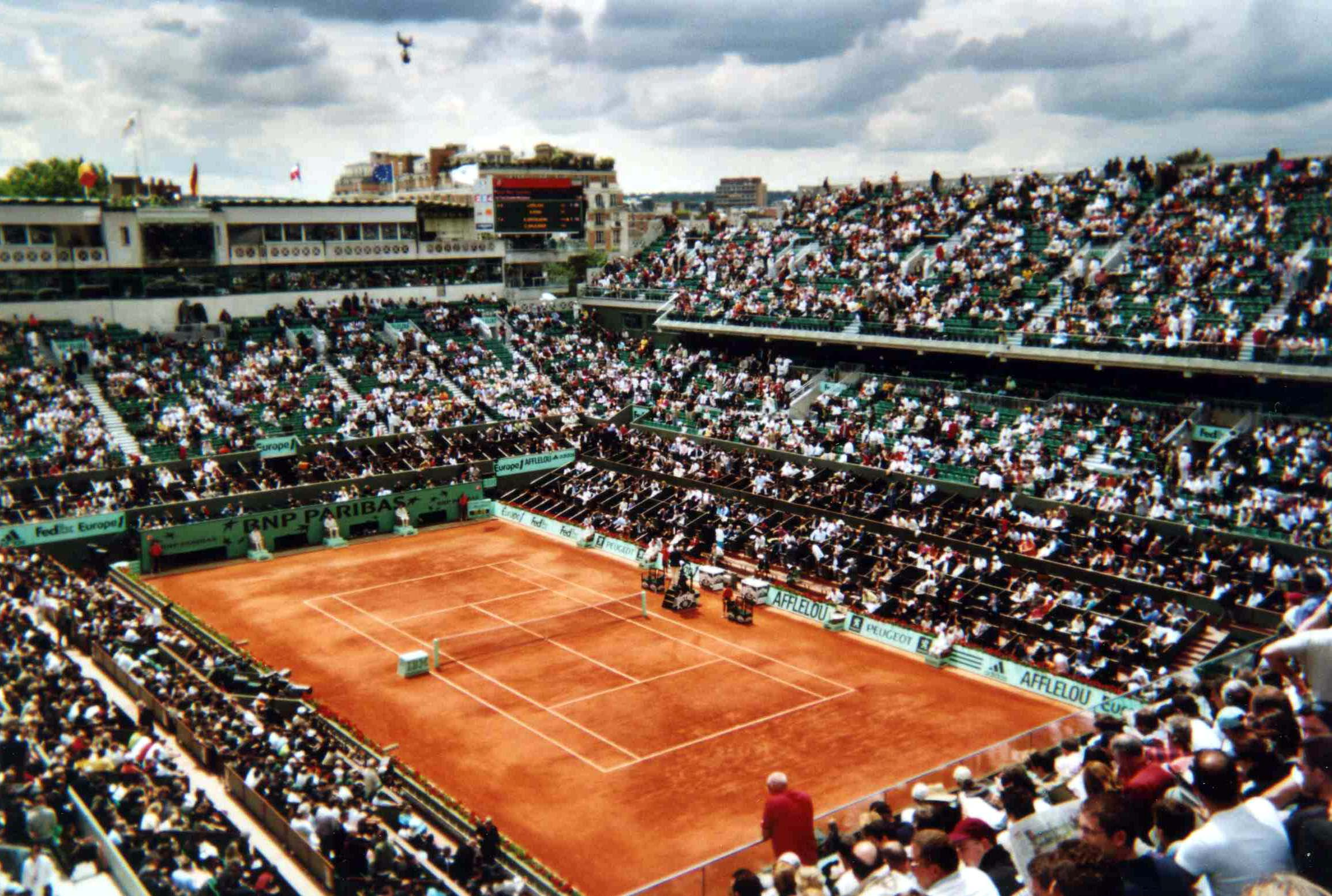
Court Philippe Chatrier, where the finals of the French Open take place

The 2015 French Open was the 114th edition of the French Open and was held at Stade Roland Garros in Paris.

The tournament is an event run by the International Tennis Federation (ITF) and is part of the 2015 ATP World Tour and the 2015 WTA Tour calendars under the Grand Slam category. The tournament consists of both men's and women's singles and doubles draws as well as a mixed doubles event.

There is a singles and doubles events for both boys and girls (players under 18), which is part of the Grade A category of tournaments, and singles and doubles events for men's and women's wheelchair tennis players as part of the UNIQLO tour under the Grand Slam category. The tournament was played on clay courts and took place over a series of 22 courts, including the three main showcourts, Court Philippe Chatrier, Court Suzanne Lenglen and Court 1.

== Points and prize money ==
=== Points distribution ===
Below is a series of tables for each of the competitions showing the ranking points on offer for each event.

==== Senior points ====
Event	W	F	SF	QF	Round of 16	Round of 32	Round of 64	Round of 128	Q	Q3	Q2	Q1
Men's singles	2000	1200	720	360	180	90	45	10	25	16	8	0
Men's doubles	2000	1200	720	360	180	90	0	—N/a	—N/a	—N/a	—N/a	—N/a
Women's singles	2000	1300	780	430	240	130	70	10	40	30	20	2
Women's doubles	2000	1300	780	430	240	130	10	—N/a	—N/a	—N/a	—N/a	—N/a

==== Wheelchair points ====
Event	W	F	SF/3rd	QF/4th
Singles	800	500	375	100
Doubles	800	500	100	—N/a
Quad singles	800	500	100	—N/a
Quad doubles	800	100	—N/a	—N/a

==== Junior points ====
Event	W	F	SF	QF	Round of 16	Round of 32	Q	Q3
Boys' singles	375	270	180	120	75	30	25	20
Girls' singles	375	270	180	120	75	30	25	20
Boys' doubles	270	180	120	75	45	—N/a	—N/a	—N/a
Girls' doubles	270	180	120	75	45	—N/a	—N/a	—N/a

=== Prize money ===
The total prize money for the tournament was €28,028,600, an increase of €3 million compared to the previous edition. The winners of the men's and women's singles title receive €1,800,000, an increase of 9% compared to 2014.

Event	W	F	SF	QF	Round of 16	Round of 32	Round of 64	Round of 128	Q3	Q2	Q1
Singles	€1,800,000	€900,000	€450,000	€250,000	€145,000	€85,000	€50,000	€27,000	€12,000	€6,000	€3,000
Doubles *	€450,000	€225,000	€112,500	€61,000	€33,000	€18,000	€9,000	—N/a	—N/a	—N/a	—N/a
Mixed doubles *	€114,000	€57,000	€28,000	€15,000	€8,000	€4,000	—N/a	—N/a	—N/a	—N/a	—N/a
Wheelchair singles	€28,000	€14,000	€7,000	€4,000	—N/a	—N/a	—N/a	—N/a	—N/a	—N/a	—N/a
Wheelchair doubles *	€8,000	€4,000	€2,400	—N/a	—N/a	—N/a	—N/a	—N/a	—N/a	—N/a	—N/a

_{* per team}

== Singles players ==
Men's singles

Champion		Runner-up	
(Switzerland) Stan Wawrinka [8]		(Serbia) Novak Djokovic [1]	
Semifinals out
(United Kingdom) Andy Murray [3]		(France) Jo-Wilfried Tsonga [14]	
Quarterfinals out
(Spain) Rafael Nadal [6]	(Spain) David Ferrer [7]	(Japan) Kei Nishikori [5]	(Switzerland) Roger Federer [2]
4th round out
(France) Richard Gasquet [20]	(United States) Jack Sock	(France) Jérémy Chardy	(Croatia) Marin Čilić [9]
(Russia) Teymuraz Gabashvili	(Czech Republic) Tomáš Berdych [4]	(France) Gilles Simon [12]	(France) Gaël Monfils [13]
3rd round out
(Australia) Thanasi Kokkinakis (WC)	(South Africa) Kevin Anderson [16]	(Croatia) Borna Ćorić	(Russia) Andrey Kuznetsov
(Australia) Nick Kyrgios [29]	(Belgium) David Goffin [17]	(Argentina) Leonardo Mayer [23]	(Italy) Simone Bolelli
(Germany) Benjamin Becker	(Czech Republic) Lukáš Rosol	(Spain) Pablo Andújar	(France) Benoît Paire
(United States) Steve Johnson	(France) Nicolas Mahut (WC)	(Uruguay) Pablo Cuevas [21]	(Bosnia and Herzegovina) Damir Džumhur
2nd round out
(Luxembourg) Gilles Müller	(Australia) Bernard Tomic [27]	(Argentina) Carlos Berlocq	(Chinese Taipei) Lu Yen-hsun
(Spain) Pablo Carreño Busta	(Spain) Tommy Robredo [18]	(Austria) Jürgen Melzer	(Spain) Nicolás Almagro
(Portugal) João Sousa	(United Kingdom) Kyle Edmund (Q)	(Colombia) Santiago Giraldo	(United States) John Isner [16]
(Italy) Andrea Arnaboldi (Q)	(Poland) Jerzy Janowicz	(Serbia) Viktor Troicki [31]	(Spain) Daniel Gimeno Traver
(Brazil) Thomaz Bellucci	(Spain) Fernando Verdasco [32]	(Spain) Roberto Bautista Agut [19]	(Argentina) Juan Mónaco
(Israel) Dudi Sela	(Germany) Philipp Kohlschreiber [22]	(Italy) Fabio Fognini [28]	(Czech Republic) Radek Štěpánek (PR)
(Serbia) Dušan Lajović	(Ukraine) Sergiy Stakhovsky	(Latvia) Ernests Gulbis [24]	(Slovakia) Martin Kližan
(Argentina) Diego Schwartzman	(Austria) Dominic Thiem	(Cyprus) Marcos Baghdatis	(Spain) Marcel Granollers
1st round out
(Finland) Jarkko Nieminen	(Italy) Paolo Lorenzi	(Georgia (country)) Nikoloz Basilashvili (Q)	(Italy) Luca Vanni (Q)
(Belgium) Germain Gigounon (Q)	(Ukraine) Illya Marchenko (Q)	(Slovenia) Blaž Kavčič	(United States) Tim Smyczek
(Bulgaria) Grigor Dimitrov [10]	(Dominican Republic) Víctor Estrella Burgos	(United States) Sam Querrey	(Kazakhstan) Andrey Golubev (LL)
(France) Adrian Mannarino [30]	(Tunisia) Malek Jaziri	(Ukraine) Alexandr Dolgopolov	(France) Quentin Halys (WC)
(Argentina) Facundo Argüello (LL)	(Canada) Vasek Pospisil	(France) Stéphane Robert (Q)	(Uzbekistan) Denis Istomin
(Serbia) Filip Krajinović	(United States) Donald Young	(Germany) Michael Berrer (Q)	(Italy) Andreas Seppi
(Netherlands) Robin Haase	(Australia) James Duckworth	(France) Maxime Hamou (WC)	(Czech Republic) Jiří Veselý
(Germany) Jan-Lennard Struff	(Belgium) Steve Darcis	(Brazil) João Souza	(Slovakia) Lukáš Lacko
(France) Paul-Henri Mathieu (WC)	(Australia) Marinko Matosevic	(Belgium) Ruben Bemelmans	(Japan) Taro Daniel (Q)
(Germany) Florian Mayer (PR)	(Sweden) Elias Ymer (Q)	(Argentina) Federico Delbonis	(Spain) Feliciano López [11]
(Sweden) Christian Lindell (Q)	(Kazakhstan) Mikhail Kukushkin	(Spain) Albert Ramos	(Japan) Go Soeda
(Japan) Tatsuma Ito	(Portugal) Gastão Elias (Q)	(Croatia) Ivan Dodig	(Japan) Yoshihito Nishioka (Q)
(Turkey) Marsel İlhan	(Argentina) Máximo González	(Lithuania) Ričardas Berankis	(Spain) Guillermo García López [26]
(Netherlands) Igor Sijsling (Q)	(Belgium) Kimmer Coppejans (Q)	(United States) Frances Tiafoe (WC)	(France) Lucas Pouille (WC)
(France) Édouard Roger-Vasselin (WC)	(Austria) Andreas Haider-Maurer	(United Kingdom) Aljaž Bedene	(Australia) Sam Groth
(Croatia) Ivo Karlović [25]	(Russia) Mikhail Youzhny	(Germany) Matthias Bachinger (Q)	(Colombia) Alejandro Falla (LL)

Women's singles

Champion		Runner-up	
(United States) Serena Williams [1]		(Czech Republic) Lucie Šafářová [13]	
Semifinals out
(Switzerland) Timea Bacsinszky [23]		(Serbia) Ana Ivanovic [7]	
Quarterfinals out
(Italy) Sara Errani [17]	(Belgium) Alison Van Uytvanck	(Ukraine) Elina Svitolina [19]	(Spain) Garbiñe Muguruza [21]
4th round out
(United States) Sloane Stephens	(Germany) Julia Görges	(Czech Republic) Petra Kvitová [4]	(Romania) Andreea Mitu
(Russia) Ekaterina Makarova [9]	(France) Alizé Cornet [29]	(Italy) Flavia Pennetta [28]	(Russia) Maria Sharapova [2]
3rd round out
(Belarus) Victoria Azarenka [27]	(Bulgaria) Tsvetana Pironkova	(Germany) Andrea Petkovic [10]	(United States) Irina Falconi
(Romania) Irina-Camelia Begu [30]	(United States) Madison Keys [16]	(Italy) Francesca Schiavone	(France) Kristina Mladenovic
(Croatia) Donna Vekić	(Russia) Elena Vesnina	(Germany) Annika Beck	(Croatia) Mirjana Lučić-Baroni
(Spain) Carla Suárez Navarro [8]	(Germany) Angelique Kerber [11]	(Germany) Sabine Lisicki [20]	(Australia) Samantha Stosur [26]
2nd round out
(Germany) Anna-Lena Friedsam	(Czech Republic) Lucie Hradecká	(Czech Republic) Denisa Allertová	(United Kingdom) Heather Watson
(Spain) Lourdes Domínguez Lino (Q)	(Germany) Carina Witthöft	(Bulgaria) Sesil Karatantcheva (Q)	(Denmark) Caroline Wozniacki [5]
(Spain) Sílvia Soler Espinosa	(Croatia) Ana Konjuh	(Czech Republic) Tereza Smitková	(Switzerland) Belinda Bencic
(Czech Republic) Karolína Plíšková [12]	(Russia) Svetlana Kuznetsova [18]	(Kazakhstan) Zarina Diyas [32]	(Montenegro) Danka Kovinić
(Japan) Misaki Doi	(Serbia) Bojana Jovanovski	(Slovenia) Polona Hercog	(Brazil) Teliana Pereira (Q)
(Poland) Paula Kania (Q)	(Kazakhstan) Yulia Putintseva	(Romania) Alexandra Dulgheru	(Romania) Simona Halep [3]
(France) Virginie Razzano (WC)	(Slovakia) Magdaléna Rybáriková	(Italy) Camila Giorgi	(Australia) Ajla Tomljanović
(Japan) Kurumi Nara	(Australia) Daria Gavrilova	(France) Amandine Hesse (WC)	(Russia) Vitalia Diatchenko
1st round out
(Czech Republic) Andrea Hlaváčková (Q)	(United States) Alexa Glatch (Q)	(China) Zheng Saisai	(Spain) María Teresa Torró Flor
(Czech Republic) Barbora Strýcová [22]	(United Kingdom) Johanna Konta (Q)	(France) Mathilde Johansson (WC)	(United States) Venus Williams [15]
(United States) Shelby Rogers	(United States) Christina McHale	(Czech Republic) Kateřina Siniaková	(United States) Alison Riske
(Serbia) Jelena Janković [25]	(France) Manon Arcangioli (WC)	(United States) CoCo Vandeweghe	(Italy) Karin Knapp
(New Zealand) Marina Erakovic	(France) Pauline Parmentier	(Russia) Margarita Gasparyan (Q)	(United States) Bethanie Mattek-Sands (PR)
(Spain) Lara Arruabarrena	(United States) Taylor Townsend	(Slovakia) Daniela Hantuchová	(United States) Varvara Lepchenko
(China) Zhang Shuai	(France) Alizé Lim (WC)	(China) Wang Qiang	(Netherlands) Kiki Bertens
(Germany) Dinah Pfizenmaier (Q)	(Slovakia) Anna Karolína Schmiedlová	(Czech Republic) Klára Koukalová	(Canada) Eugenie Bouchard [6]
(Kazakhstan) Yaroslava Shvedova	(Czech Republic) Petra Cetkovská	(Ukraine) Lesia Tsurenko	(France) Caroline Garcia [31]
(China) Peng Shuai [24]	(Belgium) Kirsten Flipkens	(France) Fiona Ferro (WC)	(United States) Louisa Chirico (WC)
(Poland) Agnieszka Radwańska [14]	(Germany) Mona Barthel	(Serbia) Aleksandra Krunić	(Belgium) Yanina Wickmayer
(Italy) Roberta Vinci	(United States) Nicole Gibbs	(United States) Lauren Davis	(Russia) Evgeniya Rodina
(Romania) Monica Niculescu	(Paraguay) Verónica Cepede Royg (Q)	(Australia) Olivia Rogowska (Q)	(Poland) Magda Linette
(Croatia) Petra Martić (Q)	(Germany) Tatjana Maria	(Australia) Casey Dellacqua	(Hungary) Tímea Babos
(Russia) Anastasia Pavlyuchenkova	(France) Océane Dodin (WC)	(Sweden) Johanna Larsson	(Puerto Rico) Monica Puig
(United States) Madison Brengle	(Australia) Jarmila Gajdošová	(Switzerland) Stefanie Vögele	(Estonia) Kaia Kanepi

== Singles seeds ==
The following are the seeded players and notable players who withdrew from the event. Seedings are based on ATP and WTA rankings as of 18 May 2015. Rank and points before are as of 25 May 2015.

=== Men's singles ===
Seed	Rank	Player	Points before	Points defending	Points won	Points after	Status
1	1	(Serbia) Novak Djokovic	13,845	1,200	1,200	13,845	Runner-up, lost to (Switzerland) Stan Wawrinka [8]
2	2	(Switzerland) Roger Federer	9,235	180	360	9,415	Quarterfinals lost to (Switzerland) Stan Wawrinka [8]
3	3	(United Kingdom) Andy Murray	7,040	720	720	7,040	Semifinals lost to (Serbia) Novak Djokovic [1]
4	4	(Czech Republic) Tomáš Berdych	5,230	360	180	5,050	Fourth round lost to (France) Jo-Wilfried Tsonga [14]
5	5	(Japan) Kei Nishikori	5,220	10	360	5,570	Quarterfinals lost to (France) Jo-Wilfried Tsonga [14]
6	7	(Spain) Rafael Nadal	4,570	2,000	360	2,930	Quarterfinals lost to (Serbia) Novak Djokovic [1]
7	8	(Spain) David Ferrer	4,490	360	360	4,490	Quarterfinals lost to (United Kingdom) Andy Murray [3]
8	9	(Switzerland) Stan Wawrinka	3,845	10	2,000	5,835	Champion, defeated (Serbia) Novak Djokovic [1]
9	10	(Croatia) Marin Čilić	3,370	90	180	3,460	Fourth round lost to (Spain) David Ferrer [7]
10	11	(Bulgaria) Grigor Dimitrov	2,760	10	10	2,760	First round lost to (United States) Jack Sock
11	12	(Spain) Feliciano López	2,280	45	10	2,245	First round lost to (Russia) Teymuraz Gabashvili
12	13	(France) Gilles Simon	2,210	90	180	2,300	Fourth round lost to (Switzerland) Stan Wawrinka [8]
13	14	(France) Gaël Monfils	2,065	360	180	1,885	Fourth round lost to (Switzerland) Roger Federer [2]
14	15	(France) Jo-Wilfried Tsonga	2,045	180	720	2,585	Semifinals lost to (Switzerland) Stan Wawrinka [8]
15	17	(South Africa) Kevin Anderson	1,970	180	90	1,880	Third round lost to (France) Richard Gasquet [20]
16	16	(United States) John Isner	1,980	180	45	1,845	Second round lost to (France) Jérémy Chardy
17	18	(Belgium) David Goffin	1,835	10	90	1,915	Third round lost to (France) Jérémy Chardy
18	19	(Spain) Tommy Robredo	1,755	90	45	1,710	Second round lost to (Croatia) Borna Ćorić
19	20	(Spain) Roberto Bautista Agut	1,750	90	45	1,705	Second round lost to (Czech Republic) Lukáš Rosol
20	21	(France) Richard Gasquet	1,625	90	180	1,715	Fourth round lost to (Serbia) Novak Djokovic [1]
21	23	(Uruguay) Pablo Cuevas	1,502	45	90	1,547	Third round lost to (France) Gaël Monfils [13]
22	28	(Germany) Philipp Kohlschreiber	1,285	90	45	1,240	Second round lost to (Spain) Pablo Andújar
23	22	(Argentina) Leonardo Mayer	1,580	90	90	1,580	Third round lost to (Croatia) Marin Čilić [9]
24	29	(Latvia) Ernests Gulbis	1,275	720	45	600	Second round lost to (France) Nicolas Mahut [WC]
25	25	(Croatia) Ivo Karlović	1,330	90	10	1,250	First round lost to (Cyprus) Marcos Baghdatis
26	24	(Spain) Guillermo García López	1,335	180	10	1,165	First round lost to (United States) Steve Johnson
27	26	(Australia) Bernard Tomic	1,320	10	45	1,355	Second round lost to (Australia) Thanasi Kokkinakis [WC]
28	27	(Italy) Fabio Fognini	1,295	90	45	1,250	Second round lost to (France) Benoît Paire
29	30	(Australia) Nick Kyrgios	1,250	0	90	1,340	Third round lost to (United Kingdom) Andy Murray [3]
30	31	(France) Adrian Mannarino	1,223	45	10	1,188	First round lost to (Austria) Jürgen Melzer
31	32	(Serbia) Viktor Troicki	1,217	(20)^{†}	45	1,242	Second round lost to (Italy) Simone Bolelli
32	33	(Spain) Fernando Verdasco	1,180	180	45	1,045	Second round lost to (Germany) Benjamin Becker

† The player did not qualify for the tournament in 2014. Accordingly, points for his 18th best result are deducted instead.

==== Withdrawn players ====
Rank	Player	Points before	Points defending	Points after	Withdrawal reason
6	(Canada) Milos Raonic	4,800	360	4,440	Right foot injury

=== Women's singles ===
Seed	Rank	Player	Points before	Points defending	Points won	Points after	Status
1	1	(United States) Serena Williams	9,361	70	2,000	11,291	Champion, defeated (Czech Republic) Lucie Šafářová [13]
2	2	(Russia) Maria Sharapova	7,710	2,000	240	5,950	Fourth round lost to (Czech Republic) Lucie Šafářová [13]
3	3	(Romania) Simona Halep	7,360	1,300	70	6,130	Second round lost to (Croatia) Mirjana Lučić-Baroni
4	4	(Czech Republic) Petra Kvitová	6,760	130	240	6,870	Fourth round lost to (Switzerland) Timea Bacsinszky [23]
5	5	(Denmark) Caroline Wozniacki	4,940	10	70	5,000	Second round lost to (Germany) Julia Görges
6	6	(Canada) Eugenie Bouchard	3,888	780	10	3,118	First round lost to (France) Kristina Mladenovic
7	7	(Serbia) Ana Ivanovic	3,655	130	780	4,305	Semifinals lost to (Czech Republic) Lucie Šafářová [13]
8	8	(Spain) Carla Suárez Navarro	3,645	430	130	3,345	Third round lost to (Italy) Flavia Pennetta [28]
9	9	(Russia) Ekaterina Makarova	3,510	130	240	3,620	Fourth round lost to (Serbia) Ana Ivanovic [7]
10	10	(Germany) Andrea Petkovic	3,310	780	130	2,660	Third round lost to (Italy) Sara Errani [17]
11	11	(Germany) Angelique Kerber	3,230	240	130	3,120	Third round lost to (Spain) Garbiñe Muguruza [21]
12	12	(Czech Republic) Karolína Plíšková	3,010	70	70	3,010	Second round lost to (Romania) Andreea Mitu
13	13	(Czech Republic) Lucie Šafářová	2,995	240	1,300	4,055	Runner-up, lost to (United States) Serena Williams [1]
14	14	(Poland) Agnieszka Radwańska	2,885	130	10	2,765	First round lost to (Germany) Annika Beck
15	15	(United States) Venus Williams	2,646	70	10	2,586	First round lost to (United States) Sloane Stephens
16	16	(United States) Madison Keys	2,275	10	130	2,395	Third round lost to (Switzerland) Timea Bacsinszky [23]
17	17	(Italy) Sara Errani	2,140	430	430	2,140	Quarterfinals lost to (United States) Serena Williams [1]
18	18	(Russia) Svetlana Kuznetsova	2,118	430	70	1,758	Second round lost to (Italy) Francesca Schiavone
19	21	(Ukraine) Elina Svitolina	2,045	70	430	2,405	Quarterfinals lost to (Serbia) Ana Ivanovic [7]
20	19	(Germany) Sabine Lisicki	2,105	70	130	2,165	Third round lost to (Czech Republic) Lucie Šafářová [13]
21	20	(Spain) Garbiñe Muguruza	2,075	430	430	2,075	Quarterfinals lost to (Czech Republic) Lucie Šafářová [13]
22	23	(Czech Republic) Barbora Strýcová	1,995	10	10	1,995	First round lost to (Bulgaria) Tsvetana Pironkova
23	24	(Switzerland) Timea Bacsinszky	1,958	110	780	2,628	Semifinals lost to (United States) Serena Williams [1]
24	26	(China) Peng Shuai	1,842	10	10	1,842	First round retired against (Slovenia) Polona Hercog
25	25	(Serbia) Jelena Janković	1,860	240	10	1,630	First round lost to (Bulgaria) Sesil Karatantcheva [Q]
26	22	(Australia) Samantha Stosur	2,010	240	130	1,900	Third round lost to (Russia) Maria Sharapova [2]
27	27	(Belarus) Victoria Azarenka	1,733	0	130	1,863	Third round lost to (United States) Serena Williams [1]
28	28	(Italy) Flavia Pennetta	1,731	70	240	1,901	Fourth round lost to (Spain) Garbiñe Muguruza [21]
29	29	(France) Alizé Cornet	1,700	70	240	1,870	Fourth round lost to (Ukraine) Elina Svitolina [19]
30	30	(Romania) Irina-Camelia Begu	1,536	30	130	1,636	Third round lost to (Czech Republic) Petra Kvitová [4]
31	31	(France) Caroline Garcia	1,475	10	10	1,475	First round lost to (Croatia) Donna Vekić
32	32	(Kazakhstan) Zarina Diyas	1,375	10	70	1,435	Second round lost to (Belgium) Alison Van Uytvanck

== Doubles seeds ==
=== Men's doubles ===
Team		Rank^{1}	Seed
(United States) Bob Bryan	(United States) Mike Bryan	2	1
(United States) Jack Sock	(Canada) Vasek Pospisil	10	2
(Croatia) Ivan Dodig	(Brazil) Marcelo Melo	11	3
(Spain) Marcel Granollers	(Spain) Marc López	12	4
(Netherlands) Jean-Julien Rojer	(Romania) Horia Tecău	23	5
(Italy) Simone Bolelli	(Italy) Fabio Fognini	33	6
(Poland) Marcin Matkowski	(Serbia) Nenad Zimonjić	33	7
(Austria) Alexander Peya	(Brazil) Bruno Soares	33	8
(India) Rohan Bopanna	(Romania) Florin Mergea	33	9
(Canada) Daniel Nestor	(India) Leander Paes	49	10
(United Kingdom) Jamie Murray	(Australia) John Peers	51	11
(Uruguay) Pablo Cuevas	(Spain) David Marrero	52	12
(Croatia) Marin Draganja	(Finland) Henri Kontinen	53	13
(France) Pierre-Hugues Herbert	(France) Nicolas Mahut	57	14
(Spain) Guillermo García López	(France) Édouard Roger-Vasselin	63	15
(Colombia) Juan Sebastián Cabal	(Colombia) Robert Farah	67	16

- ^{1} Rankings were as of 18 May 2015.

=== Women's doubles ===
Team		Rank^{1}	Seed
(Switzerland) Martina Hingis	(India) Sania Mirza	3	1
(Russia) Ekaterina Makarova	(Russia) Elena Vesnina	14	2
(Hungary) Tímea Babos	(France) Kristina Mladenovic	16	3
(Chinese Taipei) Hsieh Su-wei	(Italy) Flavia Pennetta	22	4
(Spain) Garbiñe Muguruza	(Spain) Carla Suárez Navarro	26	5
(United States) Raquel Kops-Jones	(United States) Abigail Spears	30	6
(United States) Bethanie Mattek-Sands	(Czech Republic) Lucie Šafářová	37	7
(France) Caroline Garcia	(Slovenia) Katarina Srebotnik	45	8
(Czech Republic) Andrea Hlaváčková	(Czech Republic) Lucie Hradecká	45	9
(Russia) Alla Kudryavtseva	(Russia) Anastasia Pavlyuchenkova	50	10
(Chinese Taipei) Chan Yung-jan	(China) Zheng Jie	51	11
(Australia) Casey Dellacqua	(Kazakhstan) Yaroslava Shvedova	55	12
(Netherlands) Michaëlla Krajicek	(Czech Republic) Barbora Strýcová	57	13
(Italy) Karin Knapp	(Italy) Roberta Vinci	63	14
(Australia) Anastasia Rodionova	(Australia) Arina Rodionova	73	15
(Poland) Klaudia Jans-Ignacik	(Slovenia) Andreja Klepač	75	16

- ^{1} Rankings were as of 18 May 2015.

=== Mixed doubles ===
Team		Rank^{1}	Seed
(India) Sania Mirza	(Brazil) Bruno Soares	17	1
(United States) Bethanie Mattek-Sands	(United States) Mike Bryan	20	2
(Russia) Elena Vesnina	(Serbia) Nenad Zimonjić	21	3
(Czech Republic) Andrea Hlaváčková	(Spain) Marc López	22	4
(France) Caroline Garcia	(United States) Bob Bryan	24	5
(France) Kristina Mladenovic	(Canada) Daniel Nestor	27	6
(Hungary) Tímea Babos	(Austria) Alexander Peya	28	7
(Switzerland) Martina Hingis	(India) Leander Paes	29	8

- ^{1} Rankings were as of 18 May 2015.

== Main draw wildcard entries ==
The following players were given wildcards to the main draw based on internal selection and recent performances.

=== Men's singles ===
- (France) Maxime Hamou
- (France) Quentin Halys
- (Australia) Thanasi Kokkinakis
- (France) Paul-Henri Mathieu
- (France) Nicolas Mahut
- (France) Lucas Pouille
- (France) Édouard Roger-Vasselin
- (United States) Frances Tiafoe

=== Women's singles ===
- (France) Manon Arcangioli
- (United States) Louisa Chirico
- (France) Océane Dodin
- (France) Fiona Ferro
- (France) Amandine Hesse
- (France) Mathilde Johansson
- (France) Alizé Lim
- (France) Virginie Razzano

=== Men's doubles ===
- (France) Enzo Couacaud / (France) Quentin Halys
- (France) Kenny de Schepper / (France) Benoît Paire
- (Australia) Thanasi Kokkinakis / (France) Lucas Pouille
- (France) Tristan Lamasine / (France) Johan Tatlot
- (France) Axel Michon / (France) Gianni Mina
- (France) Gaël Monfils / (France) Josselin Ouanna
- (France) Florent Serra / (France) Maxime Teixeira

=== Women's doubles ===
- (France) Manon Arcangioli / (France) Chloé Paquet
- (France) Julie Coin / (France) Pauline Parmentier
- (France) Clothilde de Bernardi / (France) Sherazad Reix
- (France) Stéphanie Foretz / (France) Amandine Hesse
- (France) Mathilde Johansson / (France) Virginie Razzano
- (France) Alizé Lim / (France) Laura Thorpe
- (France) Irina Ramialison / (France) Constance Sibille

=== Mixed doubles ===
- (France) Julie Coin / (France) Nicolas Mahut
- (France) Clothilde de Bernardi / (France) Maxime Hamou
- (France) Stéphanie Foretz / (France) Édouard Roger-Vasselin
- (France) Mathilde Johansson / (France) Adrian Mannarino
- (France) Alizé Lim / (France) Jérémy Chardy
- (France) Chloé Paquet / (France) Benoît Paire

== Main draw qualifiers ==
=== Men's singles ===
Men's singles qualifiers

1. (Georgia (country)) Nikoloz Basilashvili
2. (Netherlands) Igor Sijsling
3. (Italy) Andrea Arnaboldi
4. (Sweden) Elias Ymer
5. (Japan) Taro Daniel
6. (Italy) Luca Vanni
7. (Japan) Yoshihito Nishioka
8. (Sweden) Christian Lindell
9. (France) Stéphane Robert
10. (Belgium) Kimmer Coppejans
11. (Belgium) Germain Gigounon
12. (United Kingdom) Kyle Edmund
13. (Portugal) Gastão Elias
14. (Germany) Matthias Bachinger
15. (Ukraine) Illya Marchenko
16. (Germany) Michael Berrer

Men's singles qualifiers – lucky losers

1. (Colombia) Alejandro Falla
2. (Kazakhstan) Andrey Golubev
3. (Argentina) Facundo Argüello

=== Women's singles ===
Women's singles qualifiers

1. (Brazil) Teliana Pereira
2. (Paraguay) Verónica Cepede Royg
3. (Bulgaria) Sesil Karatantcheva
4. (Australia) Olivia Rogowska
5. (Croatia) Petra Martić
6. (United States) Alexa Glatch
7. (United Kingdom) Johanna Konta
8. (Germany) Dinah Pfizenmaier
9. (Spain) Lourdes Domínguez Lino
10. (Czech Republic) Andrea Hlaváčková
11. (Russia) Margarita Gasparyan
12. (Poland) Paula Kania

== Protected ranking ==
The following players were accepted directly into the main draw using a protected ranking:

Men's singles

- (Germany) Florian Mayer (34)
- (Czech Republic) Radek Štěpánek (57)

Women's singles

- (United States) Bethanie Mattek-Sands (52)

== Champions ==
=== Seniors ===
==== Men's singles ====
- (Switzerland) Stan Wawrinka def. (Serbia) Novak Djokovic, 4–6, 6–4, 6–3, 6–4

It was Wawrinka's 2nd Grand Slam singles title, 10th career singles title and his 1st at the French Open.

Stan Wawrinka and Novak Djokovic got off to an even start at 3–3 in the first set, when Wawrinka's serve broke down, allowing Djokovic to win the set 6–4. In the second set, Wawrinka's form improved, and he eventually broke Djokovic on his fifth opportunity, which was set point, taking the set 6–4. Although Wawrinka earned three break points on Djokovic's first service game in the third set, at 1–0, Djokovic saved them all and held serve. However, Wawrinka broke serve four games later, firing "a brilliant forehand winner" and "an equally breathtaking backhand" to earn three break points and converting the first, and went on to take the set 6–3. In the fourth set, Djokovic quickly broke Wawrinka's serve and took a 3–0 lead, but Wawrinka broke back to level the set. When Wawrinka pressed on Djokovic's serve to earn two break points at 3–3, Djokovic rebounded with a succession of points to win the game and threaten Wawrinka's own serve at 0–40. Wawrinka then mounted his own comeback to hold serve before breaking Djokovic in the next game for a 5–4 lead. After earning a championship point at 40–30, Wawrinka fired a serve that appeared as though it may have been an ace, but the chair umpire checked the mark and confirmed that the ball was out. Djokovic rallied to earn a break point, but Wawrinka held his nerve and reeled off three points in a row to claim the fourth set and match.

==== Women's singles ====
- (United States) Serena Williams def. (Czech Republic) Lucie Šafářová, 6–3, 6–7^{(2–7)}, 6–2

It was Williams's 20th Grand Slam singles title, her 3rd singles title of the year and 3rd at the French Open.

Serena Williams and Lucie Šafářová contested the finals of the women's singles championship. Williams won the first set 6–3 over Šafářová and started strong in the second set, going up 4–1 and appearing to be cruising toward her 20th major title. However, Šafářová fought back to even the set and take it into a tiebreaker, which she won easily. Momentum on her side, Šafářová won the first two games of the third set, but Williams managed to break her serve with a "heavy return". Williams did not allow Šafářová a single game for the remainder of the deciding set, winning it with the seventh break of the match.

==== Men's doubles ====
- (Croatia) Ivan Dodig / (Brazil) Marcelo Melo def. (United States) Bob Bryan / (United States) Mike Bryan, 6–7^{(5–7)}, 7–6^{(7–5)}, 7–5

It was Dodig and Marcelo's 1st Grand Slam doubles titles.

==== Women's doubles ====
- (United States) Bethanie Mattek-Sands / (Czech Republic) Lucie Šafářová def. (Australia) Casey Dellacqua / (Kazakhstan) Yaroslava Shvedova, 3–6, 6–4, 6–2

It was Mattek-Sands and Šafářová's 2nd Grand Slam doubles titles.

==== Mixed doubles ====
- (United States) Bethanie Mattek-Sands / (United States) Mike Bryan def. (Czech Republic) Lucie Hradecká / (Poland) Marcin Matkowski, 7–6^{(7–3)}, 6–1

It was Mattek-Sands' 2nd Grand Slam mixed doubles title and her 1st at the French Open.
It was Bryan's 4th Grand Slam mixed doubles title and his 2nd at the French Open.

=== Juniors ===
==== Boys' singles ====
- (United States) Tommy Paul def. (United States) Taylor Harry Fritz, 7–6^{(7–4)}, 2–6, 6–2

==== Girls' singles ====
- (Spain) Paula Badosa Gibert def. (Russia) Anna Kalinskaya, 6–3, 6–3

==== Boys' doubles ====
- (Spain) Álvaro López San Martín / (Spain) Jaume Munar def. (United States) William Blumberg / (United States) Tommy Paul, 6–4, 6–2

==== Girls' doubles ====
- (Czech Republic) Miriam Kolodziejová / (Czech Republic) Markéta Vondroušová def. (United States) Caroline Dolehide / (United States) Katerina Stewart, 6–0, 6–3

=== Wheelchair events ===
==== Wheelchair men's singles ====
- (Japan) Shingo Kunieda def. (France) Stéphane Houdet, 6–1, 6–0

==== Wheelchair women's singles ====
- (Netherlands) Jiske Griffioen def. (Netherlands) Aniek van Koot, 6–0, 6–2

==== Wheelchair men's doubles ====
- (Japan) Shingo Kunieda / (United Kingdom) Gordon Reid def. (Argentina) Gustavo Fernández / (France) Nicolas Peifer, 6–1, 7–6^{(7–1)}

==== Wheelchair women's doubles ====
- (Netherlands) Jiske Griffioen / (Netherlands) Aniek van Koot def. (Japan) Yui Kamiji / (United Kingdom) Jordanne Whiley, 7–6^{(7–1)}, 3–6, [10–8]

=== Other events ===
==== Legends under 45 doubles ====
- (Spain) Juan Carlos Ferrero / (Spain) Carlos Moyá def. (France) Arnaud Clément / (France) Nicolas Escudé, 6–3, 6–3

==== Legends over 45 doubles ====
- (France) Guy Forget / (France) Henri Leconte def. (France) Cédric Pioline / (Australia) Mark Woodforde, 4–6, 7–6^{(7–5)}, [10–3]

==== Women's legends doubles ====
- (Belgium) Kim Clijsters / (United States) Martina Navratilova def. (United States) Lindsay Davenport / (United States) Mary Joe Fernández, 2–6, 6–2, [11–9]

== Withdrawals ==
The following players were accepted directly into the main tournament but withdrew.

Before the tournament

Men's singles

- ‡ (Germany) Tommy Haas (25 PR) → replaced by (Spain) Nicolás Almagro (100)
- ‡ (Argentina) Juan Martín del Potro (7 PR) → replaced by (Russia) Andrey Kuznetsov (101)
- § (France) Julien Benneteau (39) → replaced by (Colombia) Alejandro Falla (LL)
- § (Serbia) Janko Tipsarević (39 PR) → replaced by (Argentina) Facundo Argüello (LL)
- § (Canada) Milos Raonic (6) → replaced by (Kazakhstan) Andrey Golubev (LL)

Women's singles

- † (Slovakia) Dominika Cibulková (35) → replaced by (Japan) Misaki Doi (107)
- ‡ (United Kingdom) Laura Robson (58 PR) → replaced by (Croatia) Donna Vekić (108)
- ‡ (Ukraine) Kateryna Kozlova (103) → replaced by (Montenegro) Danka Kovinić (109)

† – not included on entry list
‡ – withdrew from entry list before qualifying began
§ – withdrew from entry list after qualifying began

During the tournament
Men's singles

- (Germany) Benjamin Becker
- (United Kingdom) Kyle Edmund

== Retirements ==
Men's singles

- (Russia) Mikhail Youzhny

Women's singles

- (Australia) Daria Gavrilova
- (China) Peng Shuai
- (France) Virginie Razzano

Preceded by 2015 Australian Open	Grand Slam events	Succeeded by 2015 Wimbledon Championships
