= 2016 French Open – Women's singles qualifying =

Women's singles qualifying
- 2016 French Open

Events
| Singles | men | women | | boys | girls |
| Doubles | men | women | mixed | boys | girls |
| WC Singles | men | women | quad |
| WC Doubles | men | women | quad |
| Legends | −45 | 45+ | women |

Qualification
| Singles | men | women |
- French Open

== Seeds ==
1. (United States) Louisa Chirico (qualified)
2. (Turkey) Çağla Büyükakçay (qualified)
3. (Romania) Sorana Cîrstea (qualified)
4. (Romania) Patricia Maria Țig (first round)
5. (Switzerland) Stefanie Vögele (second round)
6. (Czech Republic) Kateřina Siniaková (qualified)
7. (United States) Anna Tatishvili (first round)
8. (Ukraine) Kateryna Kozlova (qualifying competition)
9. (Romania) Andreea Mitu (qualifying competition)
10. (United States) Lauren Davis (moved to main draw)
11. (Greece) Maria Sakkari (first round)
12. (China) Zhang Kailin (first round)
13. (Russia) Evgeniya Rodina (first round)
14. (Serbia) Aleksandra Krunić (first round)
15. (Sweden) Rebecca Peterson (first round)
16. (Austria) Tamira Paszek (first round)
17. (China) Han Xinyun (first round)
18. (Slovakia) Kristína Kučová (qualifying competition)
19. (Japan) Risa Ozaki (first round)
20. (Spain) Sílvia Soler Espinosa (qualifying competition, lucky loser)
21. (Switzerland) Romina Oprandi (first round)
22. (Czech Republic) Klára Koukalová (qualifying competition)
23. (Switzerland) Viktorija Golubic (qualified)
24. (Russia) Irina Khromacheva (qualifying competition)

== Qualifiers ==
1. (United States) Louisa Chirico
2. (Turkey) Çağla Büyükakçay
3. (Romania) Sorana Cîrstea
4. (United States) Sachia Vickery
5. (Paraguay) Verónica Cepede Royg
6. (Czech Republic) Kateřina Siniaková
7. (Slovakia) Daniela Hantuchová
8. (Turkey) İpek Soylu
9. (Switzerland) Viktorija Golubic
10. (Spain) Sara Sorribes Tormo
11. (Czech Republic) Lucie Hradecká
12. (Ukraine) Maryna Zanevska

== Lucky losers ==
1. (Spain) Sílvia Soler Espinosa

== Draw ==
=== First qualifier ===
First round
1 | (United States) Louisa Chirico | 6 | 6
(Czech Republic) Tereza Martincová | 3 | 2
(China) Wang Yafan | 1 | 1
(Czech Republic) Andrea Hlaváčková | 6 | 6
(Japan) Mayo Hibi | 2 | 3
(Switzerland) Amra Sadiković | 6 | 6
(China) Yang Zhaoxuan | 4 | 6 | 3
24 | (Russia) Irina Khromacheva | 6 | 3 | 6

Second round
1 | (United States) Louisa Chirico | 4 | 6 | 6
(Czech Republic) Andrea Hlaváčková | 6 | 4 | 3
(Switzerland) Amra Sadiković | 5 | 3
24 | (Russia) Irina Khromacheva | 7 | 6

Qualifying competition
1 | (United States) Louisa Chirico | 6 | 6
24 | (Russia) Irina Khromacheva | 3 | 1

=== Second qualifier ===
First round
2 | (Turkey) Çağla Büyükakçay | 6 | 6
(Bulgaria) Elitsa Kostova | 4 | 0
(Croatia) Petra Martić | 6^{6} | 7 | 6
(Japan) Hiroko Kuwata | 7^{8} | 5 | 4
(Japan) Eri Hozumi | 6 | 3 | 1
(Luxembourg) Mandy Minella | 4 | 6 | 6
(Russia) Polina Leykina | 2 | 2
22 | (Czech Republic) Klára Koukalová | 6 | 6

Second round
2 | (Turkey) Çağla Büyükakçay | 6 | 6^{5} | 6
(Croatia) Petra Martić | 3 | 7^{7} | 3
(Luxembourg) Mandy Minella | 6^{5} | 0
22 | (Czech Republic) Klára Koukalová | 7^{7} | 6

Qualifying competition
2 | (Turkey) Çağla Büyükakçay | 6 | 6
22 | (Czech Republic) Klára Koukalová | 1 | 3

=== Third qualifier ===
First round
3 | (Romania) Sorana Cîrstea | 6 | 6
(China) Zhang Yuxuan | 4 | 0
(Slovakia) Jana Čepelová | 6 | 4 | 6
(China) Zhu Lin | 1 | 6 | 1
(Belgium) Elise Mertens | 6 | 6^{5} | 6
(United States) Katerina Stewart | 3 | 7^{7} | 1
(Israel) Julia Glushko | 6 | 6
19 | (Japan) Risa Ozaki | 1 | 4

Second round
3 | (Romania) Sorana Cîrstea | 6 | 6
(Slovakia) Jana Čepelová | 2 | 4
(Belgium) Elise Mertens | 6^{3} | 6 | 6
(Israel) Julia Glushko | 7^{7} | 2 | 1

Qualifying competition
3 | (Romania) Sorana Cîrstea | 6 | 6
(Belgium) Elise Mertens | 3 | 0

=== Fourth qualifier ===
First round
4 | (Romania) Patricia Maria Țig | 2 | 6 | 5
(United States) Vania King | 6 | 2 | 7
WC | (France) Fiona Ferro | 7 | 6
(China) Liu Chang | 5 | 3
WC | (France) Shérazad Reix | 2 | 3
(Netherlands) Cindy Burger | 6 | 6
(United States) Sachia Vickery | 2 | 6 | 6
15 | (Sweden) Rebecca Peterson | 6 | 3 | 2

Second round
(United States) Vania King | 6 | 3 | 4
WC | (France) Fiona Ferro | 2 | 6 | 6
(Netherlands) Cindy Burger | 2 | 7 | 1
(United States) Sachia Vickery | 6 | 5 | 6

Qualifying competition
WC | (France) Fiona Ferro | 0 | 1
(United States) Sachia Vickery | 6 | 6

=== Fifth qualifier ===
First round
5 | (Switzerland) Stefanie Vögele | 6 | 3 | 6
(Germany) Anne Schäfer | 2 | 6 | 1
WC | (France) Lou Brouleau | 6 | 1 | 0
(Austria) Barbara Haas | 4 | 6 | 6
(Estonia) Kaia Kanepi | 6 | 6
WC | (France) Margot Yerolymos | 2 | 4
(Paraguay) Verónica Cepede Royg | 6^{6} | 7 | 6
21 | (Switzerland) Romina Oprandi | 7^{8} | 5 | 4

Second round
5 | (Switzerland) Stefanie Vögele | 5 | 1
(Austria) Barbara Haas | 7 | 6
(Estonia) Kaia Kanepi | 6^{1} | 5
(Paraguay) Verónica Cepede Royg | 7^{7} | 7

Qualifying competition
(Austria) Barbara Haas | 2 | 3
(Paraguay) Verónica Cepede Royg | 6 | 6

=== Sixth qualifier ===
First round
6 | (Czech Republic) Kateřina Siniaková | 6 | 6
WC | (France) Chloé Paquet | 2 | 3
(Thailand) Luksika Kumkhum | 6 | 6^{3} | 2
(United States) Kristie Ahn | 1 | 7^{7} | 6
(Spain) Laura Pous Tió | 6 | 3 | 5
(Ukraine) Olga Savchuk | 4 | 6 | 7
WC | (France) Manon Arcangioli | 6 | 4 | 5
20 | (Spain) Sílvia Soler Espinosa | 4 | 6 | 7

Second round
6 | (Czech Republic) Kateřina Siniaková | 6 | 2 | 6
(United States) Kristie Ahn | 1 | 6 | 1
(Ukraine) Olga Savchuk | 6^{3} | 2
20 | (Spain) Sílvia Soler Espinosa | 7^{7} | 6

Qualifying competition
6 | (Czech Republic) Kateřina Siniaková | 7^{7} | 6
20 | (Spain) Sílvia Soler Espinosa | 6^{2} | 1

=== Seventh qualifier ===
First round
7 | (United States) Anna Tatishvili | 2 | 5
(Slovakia) Daniela Hantuchová | 6 | 7
(Serbia) Jovana Jakšić | 5 | 3
(Czech Republic) Barbora Štefková | 7 | 6
PR | (Brazil) Beatriz Haddad Maia | 3 | 6 | 6
WC | (Australia) Olivia Rogowska | 6 | 3 | 4
(United States) Jennifer Brady | 6 | 6
14 | (Serbia) Aleksandra Krunić | 2 | 4

Second round
(Slovakia) Daniela Hantuchová | 6 | 6
(Czech Republic) Barbora Štefková | 2 | 1
PR | (Brazil) Beatriz Haddad Maia | 3 | 4
(United States) Jennifer Brady | 6 | 6

Qualifying competition
(Slovakia) Daniela Hantuchová | 7^{7} | 6
(United States) Jennifer Brady | 6^{2} | 4

=== Eighth qualifier ===
First round
8 | (Ukraine) Kateryna Kozlova | 6 | 6
(United States) Jessica Pegula | 3 | 2
PR | (France) Claire Feuerstein | 6 | 6^{6} | 6
(United States) Julia Boserup | 0 | 7^{8} | 4
PR | (United States) Melanie Oudin | 6 | 6
(Japan) Misa Eguchi | 2 | 1
(Turkey) İpek Soylu | 7^{7} | 6
13 | (Russia) Evgeniya Rodina | 6^{2} | 0

Second round
8 | (Ukraine) Kateryna Kozlova | 6 | 6
PR | (France) Claire Feuerstein | 3 | 1
PR | (United States) Melanie Oudin | 6 | 2 | 3
(Turkey) İpek Soylu | 4 | 6 | 6

Qualifying competition
8 | (Ukraine) Kateryna Kozlova | 3 | 6^{2}
(Turkey) İpek Soylu | 6 | 7^{7}

=== Ninth qualifier ===
First round
9 | (Romania) Andreea Mitu | 4 | 6 | 6
(Poland) Paula Kania | 6 | 1 | 3
(China) Lu Jiajing | 7^{7} | 6^{3} | 6
(Chinese Taipei) Chang Kai-chen | 6^{2} | 7^{7} | 2
(Czech Republic) Tereza Smitková | 6 | 6
(Japan) Riko Sawayanagi | 3 | 0
(Netherlands) Michaëlla Krajicek | 5 | 0
23 | (Switzerland) Viktorija Golubic | 7 | 6

Second round
9 | (Romania) Andreea Mitu | 7 | 6
(China) Lu Jiajing | 5 | 3
(Czech Republic) Tereza Smitková | 1 | 1
23 | (Switzerland) Viktorija Golubic | 6 | 6

Qualifying competition
9 | (Romania) Andreea Mitu | 4 | 6 | 1
23 | (Switzerland) Viktorija Golubic | 6 | 4 | 6

=== Tenth qualifier ===
First round
Alt | (Czech Republic) Jesika Malečková | 5 | 1
(France) Mathilde Johansson | 7 | 6
(Netherlands) Lesley Kerkhove | 4 | 6 | 3
(Serbia) Ivana Jorović | 6 | 4 | 6
(Chinese Taipei) Lee Ya-hsuan | 7^{8} | 3 | 1
WC | (France) Stéphanie Foretz | 6^{6} | 6 | 6
(Spain) Sara Sorribes Tormo | 6 | 6
16 | (Austria) Tamira Paszek | 2 | 2

Second round
(France) Mathilde Johansson | 4 | 4
(Serbia) Ivana Jorović | 6 | 6
WC | (France) Stéphanie Foretz | 4 | 3
(Spain) Sara Sorribes Tormo | 6 | 6

Qualifying competition
(Serbia) Ivana Jorović | 5 | 1
(Spain) Sara Sorribes Tormo | 7 | 6

=== Eleventh qualifier ===
First round
11 | (Greece) Maria Sakkari | 3 | 6 | 4
(United States) Grace Min | 6 | 3 | 6
PR | (Ukraine) Yuliya Beygelzimer | 4 | 6 | 3
(Belgium) Ysaline Bonaventure | 6 | 3 | 6
(Netherlands) Richèl Hogenkamp | 6 | 6
(Brazil) Paula Cristina Gonçalves | 3 | 4
(Czech Republic) Lucie Hradecká | 6 | 6
17 | (China) Han Xinyun | 4 | 3

Second round
(United States) Grace Min | 3 | 6 | 7
(Belgium) Ysaline Bonaventure | 6 | 4 | 5
(Netherlands) Richèl Hogenkamp | 2 | 3
(Czech Republic) Lucie Hradecká | 6 | 6

Qualifying competition
(United States) Grace Min | 7^{7} | 1 | 9
(Czech Republic) Lucie Hradecká | 6^{4} | 6 | 11

=== Twelfth qualifier ===
First round
12 | (China) Zhang Kailin | 4 | 6 | 7
(Bulgaria) Sesil Karatantcheva | 6 | 4 | 9
(Ukraine) Maryna Zanevska | 6 | 2 | 6
(New Zealand) Marina Erakovic | 2 | 6 | 4
(United States) Robin Anderson | 6 | 3 | 6
(Japan) Miyu Kato | 3 | 6 | 8
(Czech Republic) Petra Cetkovská | 0 | 0^{r}
18 | (Slovakia) Kristína Kučová | 6 | 2

Second round
(Bulgaria) Sesil Karatantcheva | 6 | 0 | 3
(Ukraine) Maryna Zanevska | 4 | 6 | 6
(Japan) Miyu Kato | 6 | 4 | 0
18 | (Slovakia) Kristína Kučová | 2 | 6 | 6

Qualifying competition
(Ukraine) Maryna Zanevska | 6 | 3 | 6
18 | (Slovakia) Kristína Kučová | 2 | 6 | 2
