= 2016 French Open – Men's singles qualifying =

Men's singles qualifying
- 2016 French Open

Events
Singles	men	women		boys	girls
Doubles	men	women	mixed	boys	girls
WC Singles	men	women	quad
WC Doubles	men	women	quad
Legends	−45	45+	women

Qualification
Singles	men	women
- French Open

This article displays the qualifying draw for men's singles at the 2016 French Open.

== Seeds ==
1. (Russia) Konstantin Kravchuk (first round)
2. (Japan) Yoshihito Nishioka (qualifying competition)
3. (Japan) Tatsuma Ito (first round)
4. (Germany) Jan-Lennard Struff (qualified)
5. (Italy) Thomas Fabbiano (qualifying competition, lucky loser)
6. (Germany) Michael Berrer (first round)
7. (Spain) Roberto Carballés Baena (qualified)
8. (Germany) Dustin Brown (qualified)
9. (United States) Tim Smyczek (first round)
10. (Ukraine) Sergiy Stakhovsky (second round)
11. (Sweden) Elias Ymer (second round)
12. (Russia) Karen Khachanov (second round)
13. (Netherlands) Igor Sijsling (qualifying competition, lucky loser)
14. (Georgia (country)) Nikoloz Basilashvili (qualified)
15. (Switzerland) Marco Chiudinelli (first round)
16. (Slovakia) Jozef Kovalík (first round)
17. (Austria) Gerald Melzer (qualified)
18. (Bosnia and Herzegovina) Mirza Bašić (second round, retired)
19. (Argentina) Carlos Berlocq (qualified)
20. (Czech Republic) Radek Štěpánek (qualified)
21. (Czech Republic) Adam Pavlásek (qualifying competition, lucky loser)
22. (Slovakia) Andrej Martin (qualifying competition, lucky loser)
23. (Japan) Go Soeda (first round)
24. (Germany) Daniel Brands (qualifying competition)
25. (Argentina) Máximo González (first round)
26. (Germany) Mischa Zverev (first round)
27. (Moldova) Radu Albot (qualified)
28. (India) Saketh Myneni (second round)
29. (United States) Jared Donaldson (qualifying competition)
30. (Brazil) Thiago Monteiro (first round)
31. (Colombia) Alejandro González (second round)
32. (United States) Dennis Novikov (second round)

== Qualifiers ==
1. (Germany) Tobias Kamke
2. (Czech Republic) Radek Štěpánek
3. (Belgium) Steve Darcis
4. (Germany) Jan-Lennard Struff
5. (Argentina) Marco Trungelliti
6. (Argentina) Carlos Berlocq
7. (Spain) Roberto Carballés Baena
8. (Germany) Dustin Brown
9. (Romania) Adrian Ungur
10. (Turkey) Marsel İlhan
11. (Austria) Gerald Melzer
12. (Spain) Jordi Samper-Montaña
13. (France) Kenny de Schepper
14. (Georgia (country)) Nikoloz Basilashvili
15. (Serbia) Laslo Đere
16. (Moldova) Radu Albot

== Lucky losers ==
1. (Netherlands) Igor Sijsling
2. (Czech Republic) Adam Pavlásek
3. (Slovakia) Andrej Martin
4. (Italy) Thomas Fabbiano

== Draw ==
=== First qualifier ===
First round
1	(Russia) Konstantin Kravchuk	6	3	4
(France) David Guez	4	6	6
(Italy) Andrea Arnaboldi	6	6
(Brazil) João Souza	3	2
(China) Bai Yan	1	2
(Germany) Tobias Kamke	6	6
(France) Maxime Chazal	3	7	4
31	(Colombia) Alejandro González	6	5	6

Second round
(France) David Guez	3	6^{2}
(Italy) Andrea Arnaboldi	6	7^{7}
(Germany) Tobias Kamke	6	6
31	(Colombia) Alejandro González	4	4

Qualifying competition
(Italy) Andrea Arnaboldi	5	4
(Germany) Tobias Kamke	7	6

=== Second qualifier ===
First round
2	(Japan) Yoshihito Nishioka	2	7	7
WC	(France) Gleb Sakharov	6	5	5
(Switzerland) Henri Laaksonen	7^{7}	6^{5}	6
(Brazil) André Ghem	6^{5}	7^{7}	2
(India) Ramkumar Ramanathan	3	3
WC	(Australia) Matthew Barton	6	6
PR	(Germany) Cedrik-Marcel Stebe	4	4
20	(Czech Republic) Radek Štěpánek	6	6

Second round
2	(Japan) Yoshihito Nishioka	6	2	8
(Switzerland) Henri Laaksonen	2	6	6
WC	(Australia) Matthew Barton	6	2	5
20	(Czech Republic) Radek Štěpánek	3	6	7

Qualifying competition
2	(Japan) Yoshihito Nishioka	3	2
20	(Czech Republic) Radek Štěpánek	6	6

=== Third qualifier ===
First round
3	(Japan) Tatsuma Ito	4	3
(Germany) Peter Gojowczyk	6	6
(United States) Tommy Paul	7^{7}	7^{8}
(Spain) Adrián Menéndez-Maceiras	6^{4}	6^{6}
(Serbia) Nikola Milojević	6	1	2
(Belgium) Steve Darcis	3	6	6
(Belgium) Ruben Bemelmans	6	6
30	(Brazil) Thiago Monteiro	3	3

Second round
(Germany) Peter Gojowczyk	7^{7}	6
(United States) Tommy Paul	6^{1}	3
(Belgium) Steve Darcis	6	6
(Belgium) Ruben Bemelmans	3	3

Qualifying competition
(Germany) Peter Gojowczyk	2	2
(Belgium) Steve Darcis	6	6

=== Fourth qualifier ===
First round
4	(Germany) Jan-Lennard Struff	6^{2}	6	6
(Australia) Benjamin Mitchell	7^{7}	4	3
(Russia) Andrey Rublev	6	6^{4}	6
(Czech Republic) Jan Šátral	4	7^{7}	4
WC	(France) Geoffrey Blancaneaux	3	7^{7}	6
(Japan) Hiroki Moriya	6	6^{4}	1
(Germany) Nils Langer	3	1
22	(Slovakia) Andrej Martin	6	6

Second round
4	(Germany) Jan-Lennard Struff	6	7^{7}
(Russia) Andrey Rublev	1	6^{1}
WC	(France) Geoffrey Blancaneaux	2	2
22	(Slovakia) Andrej Martin	6	6

Qualifying competition
4	(Germany) Jan-Lennard Struff	6	7^{9}
22	(Slovakia) Andrej Martin	4	6^{7}

=== Fifth qualifier ===
First round
5	(Italy) Thomas Fabbiano	6	6
WC	(France) Jonathan Eysseric	4	3
(China) Li Zhe	7	7
(Australia) Luke Saville	5	5
(Argentina) Marco Trungelliti	6^{6}	7	6
PR	(Germany) Matthias Bachinger	7^{8}	5	3
(United States) Noah Rubin	3	4
32	(United States) Dennis Novikov	6	6

Second round
5	(Italy) Thomas Fabbiano	6	6
(China) Li Zhe	1	1
(Argentina) Marco Trungelliti	7	3	7
32	(United States) Dennis Novikov	5	6	5

Qualifying competition
5	(Italy) Thomas Fabbiano	6^{4}	0
(Argentina) Marco Trungelliti	7^{7}	6

=== Sixth qualifier ===
First round
6	(Germany) Michael Berrer	6^{7}	5
(Kazakhstan) Aleksandr Nedovyesov	7^{9}	7
PR	(Germany) Julian Reister	6	5	2
WC	(France) Laurent Lokoli	0	7	6
(Estonia) Jürgen Zopp	5	6^{5}
(Belgium) Arthur De Greef	7	7^{7}
(Colombia) Alejandro Falla	4	4
19	(Argentina) Carlos Berlocq	6	6

Second round
(Kazakhstan) Aleksandr Nedovyesov	7^{7}	4	6
WC	(France) Laurent Lokoli	6^{5}	6	1
(Belgium) Arthur De Greef	3	7	7
19	(Argentina) Carlos Berlocq	6	5	9

Qualifying competition
(Kazakhstan) Aleksandr Nedovyesov	2	4
19	(Argentina) Carlos Berlocq	6	6

=== Seventh qualifier ===
First round
7	(Spain) Roberto Carballés Baena	7^{7}	4	6
(United States) Daniel Nguyen	6^{3}	6	3
(Serbia) Peđa Krstin	7	6
WC	(France) Corentin Denolly	5	3
(Belgium) Kimmer Coppejans	6	6
(Slovenia) Blaž Rola	4	2
(Romania) Marius Copil	6	2	6
23	(Japan) Go Soeda	4	6	3

Second round
7	(Spain) Roberto Carballés Baena	6	6
(Serbia) Peđa Krstin	4	2
(Belgium) Kimmer Coppejans	3	4
(Romania) Marius Copil	6	6

Qualifying competition
7	(Spain) Roberto Carballés Baena	6	3	6
(Romania) Marius Copil	4	6	4

=== Eighth qualifier ===
First round
8	(Germany) Dustin Brown	6	6
(El Salvador) Marcelo Arévalo	1	3
(Colombia) Eduardo Struvay	5	3
(France) Calvin Hemery	7	6
(Belgium) Yannick Mertens	6	2
(Belarus) Egor Gerasimov	3	0^{r}
WC	(France) Yannick Jankovits	1	2
24	(Germany) Daniel Brands	6	6

Second round
8	(Germany) Dustin Brown	7	6
(France) Calvin Hemery	5	4
(Belgium) Yannick Mertens	4	4
24	(Germany) Daniel Brands	6	6

Qualifying competition
8	(Germany) Dustin Brown	7^{7}	6
24	(Germany) Daniel Brands	6^{1}	3

=== Ninth qualifier ===
First round
9	(United States) Tim Smyczek	2	7^{7}	3
(Romania) Adrian Ungur	6	6^{0}	6
(Hungary) Márton Fucsovics	6	6
(China) Wu Di	1	3
(Brazil) Guilherme Clezar	6	5	2
(United States) Frances Tiafoe	1	7	6
(South Korea) Lee Duck-hee	6	6^{3}	4
28	(India) Saketh Myneni	1	7^{7}	6

Second round
(Romania) Adrian Ungur	6	6
(Hungary) Márton Fucsovics	4	2
(United States) Frances Tiafoe	7^{7}	7
28	(India) Saketh Myneni	6^{5}	5

Qualifying competition
(Romania) Adrian Ungur	4	6	6
(United States) Frances Tiafoe	6	2	4

=== Tenth qualifier ===
First round
10	(Ukraine) Sergiy Stakhovsky	6	6
(United Kingdom) Brydan Klein	3	3
(Ukraine) Artem Smirnov	5	4
(Turkey) Marsel İlhan	7	6
(Belarus) Uladzimir Ignatik	6^{3}	7^{8}	7
(Italy) Federico Gaio	7^{7}	6^{6}	9
(Argentina) Guido Andreozzi	6	6
25	(Argentina) Máximo González	4	3

Second round
10	(Ukraine) Sergiy Stakhovsky	4	4
(Turkey) Marsel İlhan	6	6
(Italy) Federico Gaio	6^{2}	5
(Argentina) Guido Andreozzi	7^{7}	7

Qualifying competition
(Turkey) Marsel İlhan	3	6	8
(Argentina) Guido Andreozzi	6	2	6

=== Eleventh qualifier ===
First round
11	(Sweden) Elias Ymer	6	6
(Kazakhstan) Dmitry Popkó	3	3
(Italy) Matteo Donati	6	6
(United Kingdom) James Ward	4	3
(Italy) Alessandro Giannessi	3	2
(United States) Ryan Harrison	6	6
(Uzbekistan) Farrukh Dustov	0	6	3
17	(Austria) Gerald Melzer	6	3	6

Second round
11	(Sweden) Elias Ymer	2	6	5
(Italy) Matteo Donati	6	2	7
(United States) Ryan Harrison	4	7^{7}	4
17	(Austria) Gerald Melzer	6	6^{5}	6

Qualifying competition
(Italy) Matteo Donati	4	4
17	(Austria) Gerald Melzer	6	6

=== Twelfth qualifier ===
First round
12	(Russia) Karen Khachanov	6	6
WC	(France) Maxime Hamou	2	3
(Spain) Jordi Samper-Montaña	6	3	6
(Israel) Amir Weintraub	2	6	2
WC	(France) Maxime Janvier	4	4
(Russia) Aslan Karatsev	6	6
(Slovakia) Norbert Gombos	3	7^{7}	6
18	(Bosnia and Herzegovina) Mirza Bašić	6	6^{4}	8

Second round
12	(Russia) Karen Khachanov	4	6	2
(Spain) Jordi Samper-Montaña	6	2	6
(Russia) Aslan Karatsev	2
18	(Bosnia and Herzegovina) Mirza Bašić	0^{r}

Qualifying competition
(Spain) Jordi Samper-Montaña	6	6
(Russia) Aslan Karatsev	2	3

=== Thirteenth qualifier ===
First round
13	(Netherlands) Igor Sijsling	6^{6}	7^{7}	6
(Croatia) Franko Škugor	7^{8}	6^{5}	3
(Slovenia) Grega Žemlja	3	6	6
(United States) Stefan Kozlov	6	3	1
(France) Kenny de Schepper	6	7^{7}
(Italy) Filippo Volandri	3	6^{2}
(France) Vincent Millot	7	6
26	(Germany) Mischa Zverev	5	4

Second round
13	(Netherlands) Igor Sijsling	6	6
(Slovenia) Grega Žemlja	4	0
(France) Kenny de Schepper	6	6
(France) Vincent Millot	1	4

Qualifying competition
13	(Netherlands) Igor Sijsling	3	2
(France) Kenny de Schepper	6	6

=== Fourteenth qualifier ===
First round
14	(Georgia (country)) Nikoloz Basilashvili	6	4	6
(France) Tristan Lamasine	3	6	1
(Spain) Daniel Gimeno Traver	6	3	6
(Italy) Luca Vanni	4	6	3
(Russia) Alexander Kudryavtsev	3	5
(France) Axel Michon	6	7
(Ukraine) Denys Molchanov	5^{r}
29	(United States) Jared Donaldson	4

Second round
14	(Georgia (country)) Nikoloz Basilashvili	6	4	6
(Spain) Daniel Gimeno Traver	3	6	4
(France) Axel Michon	3	6^{7}
29	(United States) Jared Donaldson	6	7^{9}

Qualifying competition
14	(Georgia (country)) Nikoloz Basilashvili	4	7	6
29	(United States) Jared Donaldson	6	5	2

=== Fifteenth qualifier ===
First round
15	(Switzerland) Marco Chiudinelli	4	0
(Serbia) Laslo Đere	6	6
PR	(France) Albano Olivetti	5	6^{8}
(Argentina) Nicolás Kicker	7	7^{10}
(Chile) Hans Podlipnik Castillo	6	3	6
(Serbia) Miljan Zekić	4	6	3
(Chile) Gonzalo Lama	3	6	4
21	(Czech Republic) Adam Pavlásek	6	3	6

Second round
(Serbia) Laslo Đere	7^{10}	7^{10}
(Argentina) Nicolás Kicker	6^{8}	6^{8}
(Chile) Hans Podlipnik Castillo	2	2
21	(Czech Republic) Adam Pavlásek	6	6

Qualifying competition
(Serbia) Laslo Đere	6	3	6
21	(Czech Republic) Adam Pavlásek	2	6	2

=== Sixteenth qualifier ===
First round
16	(Slovakia) Jozef Kovalík	4	5
(Kazakhstan) Andrey Golubev	6	7
(Bosnia and Herzegovina) Aldin Šetkić	6	4	2
(France) Alexandre Sidorenko	1	6	6
(Argentina) Renzo Olivo	3	3
(Sweden) Christian Lindell	6	6
(Spain) Pere Riba	3	3
27	(Moldova) Radu Albot	6	6

Second round
(Kazakhstan) Andrey Golubev	6	6
(France) Alexandre Sidorenko	4	4
(Sweden) Christian Lindell	1	5
27	(Moldova) Radu Albot	6	7

Qualifying competition
(Kazakhstan) Andrey Golubev	0	6^{1}
27	(Moldova) Radu Albot	6	7^{7}
