= 2016 French Open – Day-by-day summaries =

The 2016 French Open described below in detail, in the form of day-by-day summaries.

== Day 1 (22 May) ==
Some matches scheduled for Sunday were postponed due to rain, but half of the planned matches were completed before the rain started.

- Schedule of play

Matches on main courts
Matches on Court Philippe Chatrier (Center Court)
Event	Winner	Loser	Score
Women's singles - 1st round	(Czech Republic) Petra Kvitová [10]	(Montenegro) Danka Kovinić	6–2, 4–6, 7–5
Matches on Court Suzanne Lenglen (Grandstand)
Event	Winner	Loser	Score
Men's singles - 1st round	(France) Benoît Paire [19]	(Moldova) Radu Albot [Q]	6–2, 4–6, 6–4, 1–6, 6–4
Women's singles - 1st round	(Czech Republic) Lucie Šafářová [11]	(Russia) Vitalia Diatchenko [PR]	6–0, 6–2
Matches on Court 1
Event	Winner	Loser	Score
Men's singles - 1st round	(Australia) Nick Kyrgios [17]	(Italy) Marco Cecchinato	7–6^{(8–6)}, 7–6^{(8–6)}, 6–4

== Day 2 (23 May) ==
Play was supposed to start at 11:00 am CEST, but rain continued, and matches did not begin until 1:30 pm CEST.

- Schedule of play
- Seeds out:
  - Men's singles: (Croatia) Marin Čilić [10], (United States) Steve Johnson [33]
  - Women's singles: (Italy) Roberta Vinci [7], (Italy) Sara Errani [16], (Czech Republic) Karolína Plíšková [17], (Latvia) Jeļena Ostapenko [32]

Matches on main courts
Matches on Court Philippe Chatrier (Center Court)
Event	Winner	Loser	Score
Men's singles - 1st round	(Switzerland) Stan Wawrinka [3]	(Czech Republic) Lukáš Rosol	4–6, 6–1, 3–6, 6–3, 6–4
Men's singles - 1st round	(Japan) Kei Nishikori [5]	(Italy) Simone Bolelli	6–1, 7–5, 6–3
Women's singles - 1st round	(Poland) Agnieszka Radwańska [2]	(Serbia) Bojana Jovanovski	6–2, 6–0
Matches on Court Suzanne Lenglen (Grandstand)
Event	Winner	Loser	Score
Women's singles - 1st round	(Spain) Garbiñe Muguruza [4]	(Slovakia) Anna Karolína Schmiedlová	3–6, 6–3, 6–3
Men's singles - 1st round	(France) Gilles Simon [16]	(Brazil) Rogério Dutra Silva	7–6^{(7–5)}, 6–4, 6–2
Men's singles - 1st round	(France) Richard Gasquet [9]	(Brazil) Thomaz Bellucci	6–1, 6–3, 6–4
Matches on Court 1
Event	Winner	Loser	Score
Men's singles - 1st round	(France) Jérémy Chardy [30]	(Argentina) Leonardo Mayer	6–4, 3–6, 6–4, 6–2
Women's singles - 1st round	(Russia) Svetlana Kuznetsova [13]	(Kazakhstan) Yaroslava Shvedova	4–6, 6–1, 6–4
Women's singles - 1st round	(France) Caroline Garcia	(Ukraine) Lesia Tsurenko	7–5, 6–3

== Day 3 (24 May) ==
Angelique Kerber became just the fifth woman to win the Australian Open, then lose in the opening round at Roland Garros in the same year.

- Schedule of play
- Seeds out:
  - Men's singles: (South Africa) Kevin Anderson [18], (Germany) Philipp Kohlschreiber [24], (Argentina) Federico Delbonis [31], (Italy) Fabio Fognini [32]
  - Women's singles: (Germany) Angelique Kerber [3], (Belarus) Victoria Azarenka [5], (United Kingdom) Johanna Konta [20], (Serbia) Jelena Janković [23], (Romania) Monica Niculescu [31]

Matches on main courts
Matches on Court Philippe Chatrier (Center Court)
Event	Winner	Loser	Score
Women's singles - 1st round	(Netherlands) Kiki Bertens	(Germany) Angelique Kerber [3]	6–2, 3–6, 6–3
Men's singles - 1st round	(United Kingdom) Andy Murray [2]	(Czech Republic) Radek Štěpánek [Q]	3–6, 3–6, 6–0, 6–3, 7–5
Men's singles - 1st round	(Serbia) Novak Djokovic [1]	(Chinese Taipei) Lu Yen-hsun	6–4, 6–1, 6–1
Men's singles - 1st round	(France) Jo-Wilfried Tsonga [6]	(Germany) Jan-Lennard Struff [Q]	6–3, 6–4, 6–4
Women's singles - 1st round	(United States) Serena Williams [1]	(Slovakia) Magdaléna Rybáriková	6–2, 6–0
Matches on Court Suzanne Lenglen (Grandstand)
Event	Winner	Loser	Score
Women's singles - 1st round	(France) Kristina Mladenovic [26]	(Italy) Francesca Schiavone	6–2, 6–4
Men's singles - 1st round	(Spain) Rafael Nadal [4]	(Australia) Sam Groth	6–1, 6–1, 6–1
Women's singles - 1st round	(Serbia) Ana Ivanovic [14]	(France) Océane Dodin [WC]	6–0, 5–7, 6–2
Men's singles - 1st round	(Spain) David Ferrer [11]	(Russia) Evgeny Donskoy	6–1, 6–2, 6–0
Matches on Court 1
Event	Winner	Loser	Score
Men's singles - 1st round	(Czech Republic) Tomáš Berdych [7]	(Canada) Vasek Pospisil	6–3, 6–2, 6–1
Men's singles - 1st round	(France) Lucas Pouille [29]	(France) Julien Benneteau [WC]	6–3, 4–6, 6–4, 7–6^{(7–4)}
Women's singles - 1st round	(United States) Venus Williams [9]	(Estonia) Anett Kontaveit	7–6^{(7–5)}, 7–6^{(7–4)}
Women's singles - 1st round	(Italy) Karin Knapp	(Belarus) Victoria Azarenka [5]	6–3, 6–7^{(6–8)}, 4–0, ret.
Men's singles - 1st round	(Belgium) David Goffin [12]	(France) Grégoire Barrère [WC]	6–3, 6–3, 6–4

== Day 4 (25 May) ==
- Schedule of play
- Seeds out:
  - Men's singles: (France) Benoît Paire [19], (France) Lucas Pouille [29]
  - Women's singles: (Russia) Ekaterina Makarova [27]
  - Men's doubles: (Colombia) Juan Sebastián Cabal / (Colombia) Robert Farah [13]
  - Women's doubles: (Spain) Anabel Medina Garrigues / (Spain) Arantxa Parra Santonja [13]

Matches on main courts
Matches on Court Philippe Chatrier (Center Court)
Event	Winner	Loser	Score
Women's singles - 2nd round	(Romania) Simona Halep [6]	(Kazakhstan) Zarina Diyas	7–6^{(7–5)}, 6–2
Women's singles - 2nd round	(Spain) Garbiñe Muguruza [4]	(France) Myrtille Georges [WC]	6–2, 6–0
Men's singles - 2nd round	(United Kingdom) Andy Murray [2]	(France) Mathias Bourgue [WC]	6–2, 2–6, 4–6, 6–2, 6–3
Men's singles - 2nd round	(Canada) Milos Raonic [8]	(France) Adrian Mannarino	6–1, 7–6^{(7–0)}, 6–1
Matches on Court Suzanne Lenglen (Grandstand)
Event	Winner	Loser	Score
Women's singles - 2nd round	(Czech Republic) Petra Kvitová [10]	(Chinese Taipei) Hsieh Su-wei	6–4, 6–1
Men's singles - 2nd round	(Switzerland) Stan Wawrinka [3]	(Japan) Taro Daniel	7–6^{(9–7)}, 6–3, 6–4
Men's singles - 2nd round	(France) Richard Gasquet [9]	(United States) Bjorn Fratangelo [WC]	6–1, 7–6^{(7–3)}, 6–3
Women's singles - 2nd round	(Poland) Agnieszka Radwańska [2]	(France) Caroline Garcia	6–2, 6–4
Matches on Court 1
Event	Winner	Loser	Score
Men's singles - 2nd round	(Japan) Kei Nishikori [5]	(Russia) Andrey Kuznetsov	6–3, 6–3, 6–3
Women's singles - 2nd round	(Czech Republic) Lucie Šafářová [11]	(Switzerland) Viktorija Golubic [Q]	6–2, 6–2
Men's singles - 2nd round	(France) Gilles Simon [16]	(Argentina) Guido Pella	4–6, 1–6, 7–5, 7–6^{(7–4)}, 6–4
Women's singles - 2nd round	(United States) Sloane Stephens [19]	(Paraguay) Verónica Cepede Royg [Q]	7–6^{(7–0)}, 6–1

== Day 5 (26 May) ==
- Schedule of play
- Seeds out:
  - Men's singles: (Australia) Bernard Tomic [20], (Portugal) João Sousa [26]
  - Women's singles: (Germany) Andrea Petkovic [28]
  - Men's doubles: (South Africa) Raven Klaasen / (United States) Rajeev Ram [8]
  - Women's doubles: (United States) Bethanie Mattek-Sands / (Czech Republic) Lucie Šafářová [2], (Spain) Lara Arruabarrena / (Italy) Sara Errani [12], (United States) Vania King / (Russia) Alla Kudryavtseva [15], (Chinese Taipei) Chuang Chia-jung / (Chinese Taipei) Hsieh Su-wei [16]

Matches on main courts
Matches on Court Philippe Chatrier (Center Court)
Event	Winner	Loser	Score
Women's singles - 2nd round	(Switzerland) Timea Bacsinszky [8]	(Canada) Eugenie Bouchard	6–4, 6–4
Men's singles - 2nd round	(Spain) Rafael Nadal [4]	(Argentina) Facundo Bagnis	6–3, 6–0, 6–3
Men's singles - 2nd round	(France) Jo-Wilfried Tsonga [6]	(Cyprus) Marcos Baghdatis	6–7^{(6–8)}, 3–6, 6–3, 6–2, 6–2
Women's singles - 2nd round	(France) Kristina Mladenovic [26]	(Hungary) Tímea Babos	6–4, 6–3
Matches on Court Suzanne Lenglen (Grandstand)
Event	Winner	Loser	Score
Men's singles - 2nd round	(Czech Republic) Tomáš Berdych [7]	(Tunisia) Malek Jaziri	6–1, 2–6, 6–2, 6–4
Men's singles - 2nd round	(Serbia) Novak Djokovic [1]	(Belgium) Steve Darcis [Q]	7–5, 6–3, 6–4
Women's singles - 2nd round	(United States) Serena Williams [1]	(Brazil) Teliana Pereira	6–2, 6–1
Women's singles - 2nd round	(United States) Venus Williams [9]	(United States) Louisa Chirico [Q]	6–2, 6–1
Matches on Court 1
Event	Winner	Loser	Score
Women's singles - 2nd round	(Serbia) Ana Ivanovic [14]	(Japan) Kurumi Nara	7–5, 6–1
Men's singles - 2nd round	(Spain) Roberto Bautista Agut [14]	(France) Paul-Henri Mathieu	7–6^{(7–5)}, 6–4, 6–1
Women's singles - 2nd round	(Russia) Daria Kasatkina [29]	(France) Virginie Razzano [WC]	3–6, 6–1, 6–3
Men's singles - 2nd round	(Spain) David Ferrer [11]	(Argentina) Juan Mónaco	6–7^{(4–7)}, 6–3, 6–4, 6–2

== Day 6 (27 May) ==
- Schedule of play
- Seeds out:
  - Men's singles: (Spain) Rafael Nadal [4] (withdrew due to wrist injury), (France) Gilles Simon [16], (Australia) Nick Kyrgios [17], (United States) Jack Sock [23], (Croatia) Ivo Karlović [27], (France) Jérémy Chardy [30]
  - Women's singles: (Czech Republic) Petra Kvitová [10], (Czech Republic) Lucie Šafářová [11], (United States) Sloane Stephens [19], (Russia) Anastasia Pavlyuchenkova [24], (Czech Republic) Barbora Strýcová [30]
  - Men's doubles: (Netherlands) Jean-Julien Rojer / (Romania) Horia Tecău [2], (Finland) Henri Kontinen / (Australia) John Peers [11]
  - Women's doubles: (United States) Raquel Atawo / (United States) Abigail Spears [8]

Matches on main courts
Matches on Court Philippe Chatrier (Center Court)
Event	Winner	Loser	Score
Women's singles - 3rd round	(Spain) Garbiñe Muguruza [4]	(Belgium) Yanina Wickmayer	6–3, 6–0
Women's singles - 3rd round	(Australia) Samantha Stosur [21]	(Czech Republic) Lucie Šafářová [11]	6–3, 6–7^{(0–7)}, 7–5
Men's singles - 3rd round	(France) Richard Gasquet [9]	(Australia) Nick Kyrgios [17]	6–2, 7–6^{(9–7)}, 6–2
Men's singles - 3rd round	(Switzerland) Stan Wawrinka [3]	(France) Jérémy Chardy [30]	6–4, 6–3, 7–5
Matches on Court Suzanne Lenglen (Grandstand)
Event	Winner	Loser	Score
Women's singles - 3rd round	(Romania) Simona Halep [6]	(Japan) Naomi Osaka	4–6, 6–2, 6–3
Men's singles - 3rd round	(United Kingdom) Andy Murray [2]	(Croatia) Ivo Karlović [27]	6–1, 6–4, 7–6^{(7–3)}
Women's singles - 3rd round	(Poland) Agnieszka Radwańska [2]	(Czech Republic) Barbora Strýcová [30]	6–2, 6–7^{(6–8)}, 6–2
Men's singles - 3rd round	(Serbia) Viktor Troicki [22]	(France) Gilles Simon [16]	6–4, 6–2, 6–2
Matches on Court 1
Event	Winner	Loser	Score
Men's singles - 3rd round	(Canada) Milos Raonic [8]	(Slovakia) Andrej Martin [LL]	7–6^{(7–4)}, 6–2, 6–3
Men's singles - 3rd round	(Japan) Kei Nishikori [5]	(Spain) Fernando Verdasco	6–3, 6–4, 3–6, 2–6, 6–4
Women's singles - 3rd round	(Bulgaria) Tsvetana Pironkova	(United States) Sloane Stephens [19]	6–2, 6–1
Women's doubles - 2nd round	(Switzerland) Martina Hingis [1] (India) Sania Mirza [1]	(Japan) Nao Hibino (Japan) Eri Hozumi	6–2, 6–0

== Day 7 (28 May) ==
- Schedule of play
- Seeds out:
  - Men's singles: (France) Jo-Wilfried Tsonga [6], (Spain) Feliciano López [21], (Uruguay) Pablo Cuevas [25]
  - Women's singles: (Serbia) Ana Ivanovic [14], (Slovakia) Dominika Cibulková [22], (France) Kristina Mladenovic [26], (Russia) Daria Kasatkina [29]
  - Men's doubles: (Canada) Vasek Pospisil / (United States) Jack Sock [7]
  - Mixed Doubles: (Kazakhstan) Yaroslava Shvedova / (Romania) Florin Mergea [4]

Matches on main courts
Matches on Court Philippe Chatrier (Center Court)
Event	Winner	Loser	Score
Women's singles - 3rd round	(Switzerland) Timea Bacsinszky [8]	(France) Pauline Parmentier	6–4, 6–2
Women's singles - 3rd round	(United States) Serena Williams [1]	(France) Kristina Mladenovic [26]	6–4, 7–6^{(12–10)}
Men's singles - 3rd round	(Latvia) Ernests Gulbis	(France) Jo-Wilfried Tsonga [6]	2–5, ret.
Men's singles - 3rd round	(Serbia) Novak Djokovic [1]	(United Kingdom) Aljaž Bedene	6–2, 6–3, 6–3
Matches on Court Suzanne Lenglen (Grandstand)
Event	Winner	Loser	Score
Men's singles - 3rd round	(Austria) Dominic Thiem [13]	(Germany) Alexander Zverev	6–7^{(4–7)}, 6–3, 6–3, 6–3
Women's singles - 3rd round	(United States) Venus Williams [9]	(France) Alizé Cornet	7–6^{(7–5)}, 1–6, 6–0
Mixed doubles - 1st round	(France) Kristina Mladenovic [3] (France) Pierre-Hugues Herbert [3]	(Spain) Arantxa Parra Santonja (Croatia) Mate Pavić	6–3, 6–4
Matches on Court 1
Event	Winner	Loser	Score
Women's singles - 3rd round	(Ukraine) Elina Svitolina [18]	(Serbia) Ana Ivanovic [14]	6–4, 6–4
Men's singles - 3rd round	(Spain) David Ferrer [11]	(Spain) Feliciano López [21]	6–4, 7–6^{(8–6)}, 6–1
Men's singles - 3rd round	(Czech Republic) Tomáš Berdych [7]	(Uruguay) Pablo Cuevas [25]	4–6, 6–3, 6–2, 7–5

== Day 8 (29 May) ==
- Schedule of play
- Seeds out:
  - Men's singles: (Japan) Kei Nishikori [5], (Canada) Milos Raonic [8], (United States) John Isner [15], (Serbia) Viktor Troicki [22]
  - Women's singles: (Russia) Svetlana Kuznetsova [13], (Romania) Irina-Camelia Begu [25]
  - Men's doubles: (United Kingdom) Jamie Murray / (Brazil) Bruno Soares [4], (Philippines) Treat Huey / (Belarus) Max Mirnyi [10], (Czech Republic) Radek Štěpánek / (Serbia) Nenad Zimonjić [12], (Canada) Daniel Nestor / (Pakistan) Aisam-ul-Haq Qureshi [14]
  - Women's doubles: (Switzerland) Martina Hingis / (India) Sania Mirza [1], (Hungary) Tímea Babos / (Kazakhstan) Yaroslava Shvedova [4], (Germany) Julia Görges / (Czech Republic) Karolína Plíšková [10], (Slovenia) Andreja Klepač / (Slovenia) Katarina Srebotnik [11]

Matches on main courts
Matches on Court Philippe Chatrier (Center Court)
Event	Winner	Loser	Score
Women's singles - 4th round	(Spain) Garbiñe Muguruza [4]	(Russia) Svetlana Kuznetsova [13]	6–3, 6–4
Men's singles - 4th round	(Switzerland) Stan Wawrinka [3]	(Serbia) Viktor Troicki [22]	7–6^{(7–5)}, 6–7^{(7–9)}, 6–3, 6–2
Men's singles - 4th round	(France) Richard Gasquet [9]	(Japan) Kei Nishikori [5]	6–4, 6–2, 4–6, 6–2
Matches on Court Suzanne Lenglen (Grandstand)
Event	Winner	Loser	Score
Men's singles - 4th round	(Spain) Albert Ramos Viñolas	(Canada) Milos Raonic [8]	6–2, 6–4, 6–4
Women's singles - 4th round	(United States) Shelby Rogers	(Romania) Irina-Camelia Begu [25]	6–3, 6–4
Men's singles - 4th round	(United Kingdom) Andy Murray [2]	(United States) John Isner [15]	7–6^{(11–9)}, 6–4, 6–3
Matches on Court 1
Event	Winner	Loser	Score
Women's doubles - 3rd round	(China) Xu Yifan [9] (China) Zheng Saisai [9]	(Serbia) Aleksandra Krunić (Croatia) Mirjana Lučić-Baroni	7–5, 7–5
Men's doubles - 3rd round	(United States) Bob Bryan [5] (United States) Mike Bryan [5]	(Czech Republic) Radek Štěpánek [12] (Serbia) Nenad Zimonjić [12]	4–6, 7–6^{(8–6)}, 6–3
Men's doubles - 3rd round	(France) Julien Benneteau [WC] (France) Édouard Roger-Vasselin [WC]	(Philippines) Treat Huey [10] (Belarus) Max Mirnyi [10]	6–4, 6–4
Women's doubles - 3rd round	(Czech Republic) Barbora Krejčíková (Czech Republic) Kateřina Siniaková	(Switzerland) Martina Hingis [1] (India) Sania Mirza [1]	6–3, 6–2

== Day 9 (30 May) ==
All of the scheduled matches for the day were disrupted by continuous unfriendly weather and play was cancelled (for the first time in sixteen years).

- Schedule of play

== Day 10 (31 May) ==
Only two uncompleted matches were finished due to the rain. After losing 10 games in a row with a 6–2, 3–0 lead, and eventually losing the match, to 102nd-ranked Tsvetana Pironkova, world number two Agnieszka Radwańska described herself "surprised and angry" having to play in the rain.

- Schedule of play
- Seeds out:
  - Women's singles: (Poland) Agnieszka Radwańska [2], (Romania) Simona Halep [6]

Matches on main courts
Matches on Court Suzanne Lenglen (Grandstand)
Event	Winner	Loser	Score
Women's singles - 4th round	(Bulgaria) Tsvetana Pironkova	(Poland) Agnieszka Radwańska [2]	2–6, 6–3, 6–3
Matches on Court 1
Event	Winner	Loser	Score
Women's singles - 4th round	(Australia) Samantha Stosur [21]	(Romania) Simona Halep [6]	7–6^{(7–0)}, 6–3

== Day 11 (1 June) ==
- Schedule of play
- Seeds out:
  - Men's singles: (France) Richard Gasquet [9], (Spain) David Ferrer [11], (Spain) Roberto Bautista Agut [14]
  - Women's singles: (United States) Venus Williams [9], (Spain) Carla Suárez Navarro [12], (United States) Madison Keys [15], (Ukraine) Elina Svitolina [18]
  - Men's doubles: (France) Pierre-Hugues Herbert / (France) Nicolas Mahut [1], (India) Rohan Bopanna / (Romania) Florin Mergea [6], (Poland) Marcin Matkowski / (India) Leander Paes [16]
  - Women's doubles: (Chinese Taipei) Chan Hao-ching / (Chinese Taipei) Chan Yung-jan [3], (Czech Republic) Andrea Hlaváčková / (Czech Republic) Lucie Hradecká [6], (China) Xu Yifan / (China) Zheng Saisai [9]
  - Mixed Doubles: (Chinese Taipei) Chan Hao-ching / (United Kingdom) Jamie Murray [1], (United States) CoCo Vandeweghe / (United States) Bob Bryan [8]

Matches on main courts
Matches on Court Philippe Chatrier (Center Court)
Event	Winner	Loser	Score
Women's singles - 4th round	(United States) Serena Williams [1]	(Ukraine) Elina Svitolina [18]	6–1, 6–1
Men's singles - 4th round	(Serbia) Novak Djokovic [1]	(Spain) Roberto Bautista Agut [14]	3–6, 6–4, 6–1, 7–5
Men's singles - Quarterfinals	(United Kingdom) Andy Murray [2]	(France) Richard Gasquet [9]	5–7, 7–6^{(7–3)}, 6–0, 6–2
Women's singles - Quarterfinals	(Australia) Samantha Stosur [21]	(Bulgaria) Tsvetana Pironkova	6–4, 7–6^{(8–6)}
Matches on Court Suzanne Lenglen (Grandstand)
Event	Winner	Loser	Score
Women's singles - 4th round	(Switzerland) Timea Bacsinszky [8]	(United States) Venus Williams [9]	6–2, 6–4
Men's singles - 4th round	(Czech Republic) Tomáš Berdych [7]	(Spain) David Ferrer [11]	6–3, 7–5, 6–3
Men's singles - Quarterfinals	(Switzerland) Stan Wawrinka [3]	(Spain) Albert Ramos Viñolas	6–2, 6–1, 7–6^{(9–7)}
Women's singles - Quarterfinals	(Spain) Garbiñe Muguruza [4]	(United States) Shelby Rogers	7–5, 6–3
Matches on Court 1
Event	Winner	Loser	Score
Women's singles - 4th round	(Netherlands) Kiki Bertens	(United States) Madison Keys [15]	7–6^{(7–4)}, 6–3
Men's singles - 4th round	(Belgium) David Goffin [12]	(Latvia) Ernests Gulbis	4–6, 6–2, 6–2, 6–3
Mixed doubles - 2nd round	(India) Sania Mirza [2] (Croatia) Ivan Dodig [2]	(France) Alizé Cornet [WC] (France) Jonathan Eysseric [WC]	6–7^{(6–8)}, 6–4, [10–8]
Legends Under 45 Doubles	(Spain) Juan Carlos Ferrero (Spain) Carlos Moyá	(France) Arnaud Clément (France) Nicolas Escudé	6–2, 7–6^{(7–5)}
Legends Over 45 Doubles	(Australia) Pat Cash (United States) John McEnroe	(France) Arnaud Boetsch (France) Henri Leconte	6–4, 6–2

== Day 12 (2 June) ==
- Schedule of play
- Seeds out:
  - Men's singles: (Czech Republic) Tomáš Berdych [7], (Belgium) David Goffin [12]
  - Women's singles: (Switzerland) Timea Bacsinszky [8]
  - Mixed Doubles: (France) Kristina Mladenovic / (France) Pierre-Hugues Herbert [3], (Russia) Elena Vesnina / (Brazil) Bruno Soares [5], (Czech Republic) Andrea Hlaváčková / (France) Édouard Roger-Vasselin [6], (Chinese Taipei) Chan Yung-jan / (Belarus) Max Mirnyi [7]

Matches on main courts
Matches on Court Philippe Chatrier (Center Court)
Event	Winner	Loser	Score
Men's singles - Quarterfinals	(Serbia) Novak Djokovic [1]	(Czech Republic) Tomáš Berdych [7]	6–3, 7–5, 6–3
Women's singles - Quarterfinals	(United States) Serena Williams [1]	(Kazakhstan) Yulia Putintseva	5–7, 6–4, 6–1
Mixed doubles - Semifinals	(Switzerland) Martina Hingis (India) Leander Paes	(Czech Republic) Andrea Hlaváčková [6] (France) Édouard Roger-Vasselin [6]	6–3, 3–6, [10–7]
Matches on Court Suzanne Lenglen (Grandstand)
Event	Winner	Loser	Score
Men's singles - Quarterfinals	(Austria) Dominic Thiem [13]	(Belgium) David Goffin [12]	4–6, 7–6^{(9–7)}, 6–4, 6–1
Women's singles - Quarterfinals	(Netherlands) Kiki Bertens	(Switzerland) Timea Bacsinszky [8]	7–5, 6–2
Mixed doubles - Semifinals	(India) Sania Mirza [2] (Croatia) Ivan Dodig [2]	(France) Kristina Mladenovic [3] (France) Pierre-Hugues Herbert [3]	4–6, 6–3, [12–10]
Matches on Court 1
Event	Winner	Loser	Score
Men's doubles - Quarterfinals	(Spain) Feliciano López [15] (Spain) Marc López [15]	(France) Julien Benneteau [WC] (France) Édouard Roger-Vasselin [WC]	3–6, 6–4, 7–6^{(9–7)}
Mixed doubles - Quarterfinals	(Switzerland) Martina Hingis (India) Leander Paes	(Russia) Elena Vesnina [5] (Brazil) Bruno Soares [5]	6–4, 6–3
Legends Over 45 Doubles	(Spain) Sergi Bruguera (Croatia) Goran Ivanišević	(France) Arnaud Boetsch (France) Henri Leconte	6–3, 6–3
Legends Over 45 Doubles	(France) Yannick Noah (France) Cédric Pioline	(Sweden) Mikael Pernfors (Sweden) Mats Wilander	6–4, 6–4

== Day 13 (3 June) ==
Defending champion Stan Wawrinka lost to Andy Murray in the semi-final, thus ended his 12-match winning streak in Roland Garros. Murray became the 10th male player to reach all four major finals in open era. Martina Hingis and Leander Paes won the mixed doubles title, and became just the third team to achieve a career grand slam in mixed doubles. Furthermore, Paes won a record 10th mixed doubles title in the open era, and now has only one less than the all-time record. Hingis became the fourth woman in the open era and seventh all-time to achieve a career grand slam in mixed doubles.

- Schedule of play
- Seeds out:
  - Men's singles: (Switzerland) Stan Wawrinka [3], (Austria) Dominic Thiem [13]
  - Women's singles: (Australia) Samantha Stosur [21]
  - Men's doubles: (Croatia) Ivan Dodig / (Brazil) Marcelo Melo [3], (Poland) Łukasz Kubot / (Austria) Alexander Peya [9]
  - Mixed Doubles: (India) Sania Mirza / (Croatia) Ivan Dodig [2]

Matches on main courts
Matches on Court Philippe Chatrier (Center Court)
Event	Winner	Loser	Score
Women's singles - Semifinals	(United States) Serena Williams [1]	(Netherlands) Kiki Bertens	7–6^{(9–7)}, 6–4
Men's singles - Semifinals	(United Kingdom) Andy Murray [2]	(Switzerland) Stan Wawrinka [3]	6–4, 6–2, 4–6, 6–2
Mixed doubles - Final	(Switzerland) Martina Hingis (India) Leander Paes	(India) Sania Mirza [2] (Croatia) Ivan Dodig [2]	6–4, 4–6, [10–8]
Matches on Court Suzanne Lenglen (Grandstand)
Event	Winner	Loser	Score
Women's singles - Semifinals	(Spain) Garbiñe Muguruza [4]	(Australia) Samantha Stosur [21]	6–2, 6–4
Men's singles - Semifinals	(Serbia) Novak Djokovic [1]	(Austria) Dominic Thiem [13]	6–2, 6–1, 6–4
Women's doubles - Semifinals	(France) Caroline Garcia [5] (France) Kristina Mladenovic [5]	(Russia) Margarita Gasparyan (Russia) Svetlana Kuznetsova	6–4, 4–6, 6–3
Matches on Court 1
Event	Winner	Loser	Score
Women's doubles - Semifinals	(Russia) Ekaterina Makarova [7] (Russia) Elena Vesnina [7]	(Czech Republic) Barbora Krejčíková (Czech Republic) Kateřina Siniaková	6–4, 6–2
Men's doubles - Semifinals	(Spain) Feliciano López [15] (Spain) Marc López [15]	(Croatia) Ivan Dodig [3] (Brazil) Marcelo Melo [3]	6–2, 3–6, 7–5
Men's doubles - Semifinals	(United States) Bob Bryan [5] (United States) Mike Bryan [5]	(Poland) Łukasz Kubot [9] (Austria) Alexander Peya [9]	7–5, 6–1

== Day 14 (4 June) ==
Garbiñe Muguruza defeated defending champion Serena Williams in straight sets in the final and won her first major. Muguruza became the first Spanish woman to win a major title since Arantxa Sánchez Vicario in 1998. The all Spanish team Feliciano López and Marc López defeated the Bryan brothers in men's doubles finals, both won their first Grand Slam title.

- Schedule of play
- Seeds out:
  - Women's singles: (United States) Serena Williams [1]
  - Men's doubles: (United States) Bob Bryan / (United States) Mike Bryan [5]

Matches on main courts
Matches on Court Philippe Chatrier (Center Court)
Event	Winner	Loser	Score
Women's singles - Final	(Spain) Garbiñe Muguruza [4]	(United States) Serena Williams [1]	7–5, 6–4
Men's doubles - Final	(Spain) Feliciano López [15] (Spain) Marc López [15]	(United States) Bob Bryan [5] (United States) Mike Bryan [5]	6–4, 6–7^{(6–8)}, 6–3
Matches on Court Suzanne Lenglen (Grandstand)
Event	Winner	Loser	Score
Women's Legends Doubles Final	(United States) Lindsay Davenport (United States) Martina Navratilova	(Spain) Conchita Martínez (France) Nathalie Tauziat	6–3, 6–2
Legends Over 45 Doubles	(France) Yannick Noah (France) Cédric Pioline	(France) Mansour Bahrami (Netherlands) Richard Krajicek	7–6^{(7–5)}, 2–6, [10–8]
Legends Under 45 Doubles	(Sweden) Thomas Enqvist (Sweden) Magnus Norman	(Russia) Yevgeny Kafelnikov (Ukraine) Andrei Medvedev	4–6, 6–3, [13–11]

== Day 15 (5 June) ==
Novak Djokovic defeated first time French Open finalist Andy Murray in four sets and he completed the career Grand Slam, making him the first male player to have all four Grand Slam titles at once in a non-calendar Grand Slam year since Rod Laver in 1969.

- Schedule of play
- Seeds out:
  - Men's singles: (United Kingdom) Andy Murray [2]
  - Women's doubles: (Russia) Ekaterina Makarova / (Russia) Elena Vesnina [7]

Matches on main courts
Matches on Court Philippe Chatrier (Center Court)
Event	Winner	Loser	Score
Women's doubles - Final	(France) Caroline Garcia [5] (France) Kristina Mladenovic [5]	(Russia) Ekaterina Makarova [7] (Russia) Elena Vesnina [7]	6–3, 2–6, 6–4
Men's singles - Final	(Serbia) Novak Djokovic [1]	(United Kingdom) Andy Murray [2]	3–6, 6–1, 6–2, 6–4
Matches on Court Suzanne Lenglen (Grandstand)
Event	Winner	Loser	Score
Legends Over 45 Doubles Final	(Spain) Sergi Bruguera (Croatia) Goran Ivanišević	(France) Yannick Noah (France) Cédric Pioline	6–3, 7–6^{(7–2)}
Legends Under 45 Doubles Final	(Spain) Juan Carlos Ferrero (Spain) Carlos Moyá	(France) Sébastien Grosjean (France) Fabrice Santoro	6–4, 6–4
