= Lara Escauriza =

Paraguayan tennis player

- Country (sports): Paraguay
- Born: 14 October 1998 (age 27) Asunción, Paraguay
- Plays: Right (two-handed backhand)
- Prize money: US$ 23,299

Singles
- Career record: 75–66
- Career titles: 1 ITF
- Highest ranking: No. 764 (25 April 2022)

Grand Slam singles results
- French Open Junior: 1R (2016)
- Wimbledon Junior: 1R (2016)
- US Open Junior: 1R (2016)

Doubles
- Career record: 62–42
- Career titles: 4 ITF
- Highest ranking: No. 513 (16 April 2018)

Grand Slam doubles results
- French Open Junior: 2R (2016)
- Wimbledon Junior: 1R (2016)
- US Open Junior: 1R (2016)

Team competitions
- Fed Cup: 5–6
- Last updated on: 22 February 2024.

Lara Escauriza (born 14 October 1998) is an inactive Paraguayan tennis player.

Escauriza has a career-high singles ranking by the Women's Tennis Association (WTA) of 764, achieved on 25 April 2022. She also has a career-high doubles ranking of 513, reached on 16 April 2018. Escauriza has won four titles in doubles and one singles title on the ITF Circuit.

Escauriza also has represented Paraguay in the Fed Cup.

She is the daughter of Olympian Claudio Escauriza.

== ITF Circuit finals ==
Legend
$100,000 tournaments
$80,000 tournaments
$60,000 tournaments
$25,000 tournaments
$15,000 tournaments

=== Singles: 2 (1 title, 1 runner–up) ===
Result	W–L	Date	Tournament	Tier	Surface	Opponent	Score
Loss	0–1	Jul 2019	ITF Lima, Peru	15,000	Clay	(Argentina) Catalina Pella	6–4, 3–6, 4–6
Win	1–1	Dec 2021	ITF Lambaré, Paraguay	15,000	Clay	(Canada) Cadence Brace	6–3, 6–1

=== Doubles: 8 (4 titles, 4 runner–ups) ===
Result	W–L	Date	Tournament	Tier	Surface	Partner	Opponents	Score
Win	1–0	Jun 2017	ITF Villa del Dique, Argentina	15,000	Clay	(United States) Stephanie Nemtsova	(United States) Quinn Gleason (United States) Mara Schmidt	6–2, 6–3
Loss	1–1	Sep 2017	ITF Antalya, Turkey	15,000	Clay	(Chile) Bárbara Gatica	(Russia) Aleksandra Pospelova (Moldova) Adriana Sosnovschi	6–7^{(2)}, 5–7
Win	2–1	Sep 2017	ITF Antalya, Turkey	15,000	Clay	(Chile) Bárbara Gatica	(Netherlands) Suzan Lamens (Netherlands) Erika Vogelsang	7–5, 6–4
Win	3–1	Nov 2017	ITF Encarnación, Paraguay	15,000	Clay	(Chile) Bárbara Gatica	(Brazil) Nathaly Kurata (Brazil) Thaisa Grana Pedretti	6–4, 6–4
Loss	3–2	Mar 2018	ITF Campinas, Brazil	15,000	Clay	(Mexico) Marcela Zacarías	(Chile) Fernanda Brito (Paraguay) Camila Giangreco Campiz	4–6, 6–4, [4–10]
Loss	3–3	Mar 2019	ITF Cancún, Mexico	15,000	Hard	(Czech Republic) Karolína Beránková	(Montenegro) Vladica Babić (New Zealand) Paige Hourigan	4–6, 3–6
Loss	3–4	Jul 2019	ITF Lima, Peru	15,000	Clay	(Venezuela) Nadia Echeverría Alam	(United States) Madeleine Kobelt (Russia) Anna Makhorkina	5–7, 6–2, [4–10]
Win	4–4	Dec 2021	ITF Curitiba, Brazil	15,000	Clay	(Bolivia) Noelia Zeballos Melgar	(Brazil) Nathaly Kurata (Brazil) Eduarda Piai	6–3, 6–1
