= Ioana Mincă =

Romanian tennis player

- Full name: Ioana Mincă
- Country (sports): Romania
- Born: 27 September 1998 (age 26); Pitești, Romania
- Prize money: $4,302

Singles
- Career record: 2–3
- Career titles: 0
- Highest ranking: 1252 (25 July 2016)

Grand Slam singles results
- Australian Open Junior: 1R (2016)
- French Open Junior: QF (2016)
- Wimbledon Junior: 1R (2015, 2016)
- US Open Junior: 1R (2016)

Doubles
- Career record: 1–1
- Career titles: 0
- Highest ranking: —

Grand Slam doubles results
- Australian Open Junior: 1R (2016)
- French Open Junior: 2R (2016)
- Wimbledon Junior: QF (2016)
- US Open Junior: 2R (2016)

Ioana Mincă (born 27 September 1998) is a Romanian tennis player.

Mincă made her WTA tour debut at the 2016 BRD Bucharest Open.
