= Alberto Lim Jr. =

Filipino tennis player (born 1999)

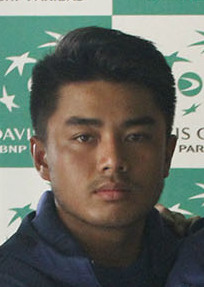
- Lim in 2018
- Country (sports): Philippines
- Born: May 18, 1999 (age 27)
- Plays: Right-handed (two-handed backhand)
- Prize money: US $7,946

Singles
- Career record: 3–5
- Career titles: 0
- Highest ranking: No. 1,496 (June 22, 2026)
- Current ranking: No. 1,123 (August 26, 2024)

Grand Slam singles results
- Australian Open Junior: 2R (2017)
- French Open Junior: 3R (2016)
- Wimbledon Junior: 2R (2015)
- US Open Junior: 1R (2016)

Doubles
- Career record: 0–0
- Career titles: 0
- Current ranking: No. 2,267 (July 21, 2025)

Grand Slam doubles results
- Australian Open Junior: 2R (2016)
- French Open Junior: 1R (2016)
- Wimbledon Junior: 1R (2015)
- US Open Junior: 2R (2015)

Team competitions
- Davis Cup: 0–1
- Last updated on: June 22, 2026.

Alberto "AJ" Lim Jr. (born May 18, 1999) is a Filipino tennis player.

Lim has a career high junior ranking of 12, achieved in January 2016.

== Early career ==
Lim started playing tennis at age 7. He trained under coach Manny Tecson for at least five years at the Tennis Academy of the Philippines Foundation. In March 2014, Lim got accepted at the L'Academie de Tennis in Florida, United States on a scholarship basis. He was first noticed at the 2011 Orange Bowl Tennis Championships where he finished second place. Tecson, offered Lim to renew his contract which expired in January 2014 but Lim declined.

== Junior career ==
In 2015, he has won six tennis titles by May. He won two singles titles and four doubles titles. Lim competed in India in January 2015 where he won the singles and doubles of the ITF Junior 1 in Chardigarh and the Delhi ITF Juniors in New Delhi. Lim also won the doubles event of the Grade 1 ITF Junior Tennis Championships in Sarawak, Malaysia and the Asian Closed Junior Championship in New Delhi, India pairing up with Nam Hoang Ly of Vietnam in the latter tournament.

== Professional career ==
In December 2016, Lim was named as part of the Philippines Davis Cup team to compete against Indonesia at the 2017 Davis Cup Asia/Oceania Group II zonal tournament along with Treat Huey, Ruben Gonzales, and Francis Alcantara. At the time of his inclusion to the team, he is the youngest member of the Davis Cup team at age 17 and is ranked 52 in the world junior rankings.

As of the same month, Lim is attending the University of the East as a first year college student.
