= 2016 French Open – Girls' singles =

Girls' singles
- 2016 French Open

Final
- Champion: (Switzerland) Rebeka Masarova
- Runner-up: (United States) Amanda Anisimova
- Score: 7–5, 7–5

Events
Singles	men	women		boys	girls
Doubles	men	women	mixed	boys	girls
WC Singles	men	women	quad
WC Doubles	men	women	quad
Legends	−45	45+	women
- French Open

Rebeka Masarova won the title, defeating Amanda Anisimova in the final, 7–5, 7–5.

Paula Badosa was the defending champion, but was no longer eligible to participate in junior events.

== Seeds ==
1. (Russia) Olesya Pervushina (semifinals)
2. (United States) Amanda Anisimova (final)
3. (United States) Kayla Day (third round)
4. (Russia) Anastasia Potapova (semifinals)
5. (Ukraine) Dayana Yastremska (third round)
6. (United Kingdom) Katie Swan (first round)
7. (Romania) Georgia Crăciun (first round)
8. (Russia) Elena Rybakina (second round)
9. (United States) Usue Maitane Arconada (third round)
10. (United States) Sofia Kenin (third round)
11. (Russia) Sofya Zhuk (first round)
12. (Switzerland) Rebeka Masarova (champion)
13. (Czech Republic) Markéta Vondroušová (third round)
14. (France) Tessah Andrianjafitrimo (second round)
15. (Hungary) Panna Udvardy (first round)
16. (Russia) Amina Anshba (first round)

== Draw ==
Key

- Q = Qualifier
- WC = Wild card
- LL = Lucky loser
- Alt = Alternate
- ITF = ITF entry
- PR = Protected ranking
- SR = Special ranking
- SE = Special exempt
- JE = Junior exempt
- JR = Junior Accelerator Programme entrant
- CO = College Accelerator Programme entrant
- NG = Next Gen Accelerator Program entrant
- w/o = Walkover
- r = Retired
- d = Defaulted

=== Finals ===
Quarterfinals
1	(Russia) Olesya Pervushina	6	6
Q	(Romania) Ioana Mincă	1	1
(Ukraine) Katarina Zavatska	3	2
12	(Switzerland) Rebeka Masarova	6	6
Q	(Poland) Iga Świątek	6	3	0
4	(Russia) Anastasia Potapova	4	6	6
WC	(France) Emmanuelle Salas	1	1
2	(United States) Amanda Anisimova	6	6

Semifinals
1	(Russia) Olesya Pervushina	6^{5}	2
12	(Switzerland) Rebeka Masarova	7^{7}	6
4	(Russia) Anastasia Potapova	6^{6}	2
2	(United States) Amanda Anisimova	7^{8}	6

Final
12	(Switzerland) Rebeka Masarova	7	7
2	(United States) Amanda Anisimova	5	5

=== Top half ===
==== Section 1 ====
First round
1	(Russia) Olesya Pervushina	6	6
(Australia) Jaimee Fourlis	1	2
WC	(France) Mylène Halemai	4	2
(United States) Maria Mateas	6	6
(Canada) Charlotte Robillard-Millette	0	4
(Serbia) Olga Danilović	6	6
(Ukraine) Anastasia Zarytska	2	1
13	(Czech Republic) Markéta Vondroušová	6	6
9	(United States) Usue Maitane Arconada	1	6	6
(Italy) Tatiana Pieri	6	4	0
(Japan) Ayumi Miyamoto	3	5
(Austria) Mira Antonitsch	6	7
WC	(France) Schena Benamar	3	2
Q	(Romania) Ioana Mincă	6	6
(United States) Caty McNally	6	6
6	(United Kingdom) Katie Swan	4	3

Second round
1	(Russia) O Pervushina	6	6
(United States) M Mateas	3	2
(Serbia) O Danilović	3	3
13	(Czech Republic) M Vondroušová	6	6
9	(United States) UM Arconada	6	6
(Austria) M Antonitsch	1	4
Q	(Romania) I Mincă	6	5	6
(United States) C McNally	2	7	4

Third round
1	(Russia) O Pervushina	5	6	7
13	(Czech Republic) M Vondroušová	7	1	5
9	(United States) UM Arconada	6	4	2
Q	(Romania) I Mincă	1	6	6

Quarterfinals
1	(Russia) O Pervushina	6	6
Q	(Romania) I Mincă	1	1

==== Section 2 ====
First round
3	(United States) Kayla Day	6	6
WC	(France) Loudmilla Bencheikh	2	3
(Peru) Dominique Schaefer	2	1
Q	(Russia) Varvara Gracheva	6	6
(Japan) Yuki Naito	4	2
(Ukraine) Katarina Zavatska	6	6
(Czech Republic) Monika Kilnarová	6	6
15	(Hungary) Panna Udvardy	4	4
12	(Switzerland) Rebeka Masarova	6	6
(China) Zheng Wushuang	2	0
SE	(United States) Claire Liu	6	6
WC	(France) Sandra Bozinovic	1	1
Q	(Italy) Federica Bilardo	6	6
(Paraguay) Lara Escauriza	2	2
(Moldova) Anastasia Dețiuc	4	3
8	(Russia) Elena Rybakina	6	6

Second round
3	(United States) K Day	7	7^{7}
Q	(Russia) V Gracheva	5	6^{3}
(Ukraine) K Zavatska	6^{5}	6	6
(Czech Republic) M Kilnarová	7^{7}	3	3
12	(Switzerland) R Masarova	7^{7}	6
SE	(United States) C Liu	6^{4}	1
Q	(Italy) F Bilardo	6	3	6
8	(Russia) E Rybakina	2	6	1

Third round
3	(United States) K Day	4	3
(Ukraine) K Zavatska	6	6
12	(Switzerland) R Masarova	6^{0}	6	6
Q	(Italy) F Bilardo	7^{7}	2	3

Quarterfinals
(Ukraine) K Zavatska	3	2
12	(Switzerland) R Masarova	6	6

=== Bottom half ===
==== Section 3 ====
First round
7	(Romania) Georgia Crăciun	3	2
Q	(Poland) Iga Świątek	6	6
(Norway) Malene Helgø	7^{7}	2	2
(Japan) Mai Hontama	6^{4}	6	6
WC	(France) Yasmine Mansouri	2	4
(Czech Republic) Lucie Kaňková	6	6
Q	(Greece) Eleni Christofi	1	2
10	(United States) Sofia Kenin	6	6
14	(France) Tessah Andrianjafitrimo	4	6	6
WC	(Japan) Ayano Shimizu	6	3	1
(Australia) Baijing Lin	6	2	2
Q	(Italy) Lucrezia Stefanini	0	6	6
(Colombia) Emiliana Arango	2	1
(United States) Alexandra Sanford	6	6
(United Kingdom) Emily Appleton	3	4
4	(Russia) Anastasia Potapova	6	6

Second round
Q	(Poland) I Świątek	6	6
(Japan) M Hontama	4	3
(Czech Republic) L Kaňková	5	1
10	(United States) S Kenin	7	6
14	(France) T Andrianjafitrimo	6^{2}	6	4
Q	(Italy) L Stefanini	7^{7}	3	6
(United States) A Sanford	3	4
4	(Russia) A Potapova	6	6

Third round
Q	(Poland) I Świątek	6	7
10	(United States) S Kenin	4	5
Q	(Italy) L Stefanini	1	6	3
4	(Russia) A Potapova	6	4	6

Quarterfinals
Q	(Poland) I Świątek	6	3	0
4	(Russia) A Potapova	4	6	6

==== Section 4 ====
First round
5	(Ukraine) Dayana Yastremska	6	6
(Japan) Chihiro Muramatsu	2	2
(Romania) Oana Gavrilă	1	5
(India) Karman Kaur Thandi	6	7
WC	(France) Emmanuelle Salas	6	6
Q	(Spain) Paula Arias Manjón	0	4
(United States) Morgan Coppoc	6	6
11	(Russia) Sofya Zhuk	1	0
16/SE	(Russia) Amina Anshba	2	3
(United States) Michaela Gordon	6	6
(Argentina) Melany Krywoj	6	6
WC	(France) Manon Léonard	2	2
(Algeria) Inès Ibbou	7	6
Q	(Switzerland) Ylena In-Albon	5	1
(Sweden) Mirjam Björklund	4	3
2	(United States) Amanda Anisimova	6	6

Second round
5	(Ukraine) D Yastremska	6	6
(India) KK Thandi	3	0
WC	(France) E Salas	2	6	6
(United States) M Coppoc	6	3	2
(United States) M Gordon	6	6
(Argentina) M Krywoj	1	3
(Algeria) I Ibbou	2	4
2	(United States) A Anisimova	6	6

Third round
5	(Ukraine) D Yastremska	5	5
WC	(France) E Salas	7	7
(United States) M Gordon	0	6	4
2	(United States) A Anisimova	6	1	6

Quarterfinals
WC	(France) E Salas	1	1
2	(United States) A Anisimova	6	6

== Qualifying ==
=== Seeds ===
1. (United Kingdom) Jodie Anna Burrage (qualifying competition)
2. (Romania) Ioana Mincă (qualified)
3. (Russia) Varvara Gracheva (qualified)
4. (Poland) Iga Świątek (qualified)
5. (Argentina) María Lourdes Carlé (first round)
6. (United States) Natasha Subhash (first round)
7. (Switzerland) Ylena In-Albon (qualified)
8. (Belgium) Lara Salden (first round)
9. (Germany) Irina Cantos Siemers (first round)
10. (United States) Ellie Douglas (first round)
11. (Czech Republic) Johana Marková (qualifying competition)
12. (China) Ren Jiaqi (qualifying competition)
13. (Spain) Paula Arias Manjón (qualified)
14. (Japan) Mayuka Aikawa (qualifying competition)
15. (Italy) Lucrezia Stefanini (qualified)
16. (China) Cao Siqi (first round)

=== Qualifiers ===
1. (Italy) Lucrezia Stefanini
2. (Romania) Ioana Mincă
3. (Russia) Varvara Gracheva
4. (Poland) Iga Świątek
5. (Spain) Paula Arias Manjón
6. (Greece) Eleni Christofi
7. (Switzerland) Ylena In-Albon
8. (Italy) Federica Bilardo

=== Draw ===
==== First qualifier ====
First round
1	(United Kingdom) Jodie Anna Burrage	6	6
WC	(France) Chloé Cirotte	1	3
(New Zealand) Jade Lewis	4	2
15	(Italy) Lucrezia Stefanini	6	6

Qualifying competition
1	(United Kingdom) Jodie Anna Burrage	6^{5}	6^{3}
15	(Italy) Lucrezia Stefanini	7	7^{7}

==== Second qualifier ====
First round
2	(Romania) Ioana Mincă	6	6
(China) Du Zhima	0	0
(Turkey) Berfu Cengiz	4	6	6
9	(Germany) Irina Cantos Siemers	6	2	2

Qualifying competition
2	(Romania) Ioana Mincă	6	6
(Turkey) Berfu Cengiz	3	2

==== Third qualifier ====
First round
3	(Russia) Varvara Gracheva	6	6
WC	(France) Diane Parry	4	3
(Australia) Destanee Aiava	6	6
10	(United States) Ellie Douglas	4	1

Qualifying competition
3	(Russia) Varvara Gracheva	6	6
(Australia) Destanee Aiava	2	2

==== Fourth qualifier ====
First round
4	(Poland) Iga Świątek	6	6
(Netherlands) Nina Kruijer	3	1
WC	(France) Giulia Morlet	2	1
12	(China) Ren Jiaqi	6	6

Qualifying competition
4	(Poland) Iga Świątek	6	6
12	(China) Ren Jiaqi	1	4

==== Fifth qualifier ====
First round
5	(Argentina) María Lourdes Carlé	3	2
(China) Ma Shuyue	6	6
WC	(Dominican Republic) Julia Vulpio	0	2
13	(Spain) Paula Arias Manjón	6	6

Qualifying competition
(China) Ma Shuyue	4	3
13	(Spain) Paula Arias Manjón	6	6

==== Sixth qualifier ====
First round
6	(United States) Natasha Subhash	1	2
(Greece) Eleni Christofi	6	6
(China) Yuan Yue	1	6^{5}
14	(Japan) Mayuka Aikawa	6	7^{7}

Qualifying competition
(Greece) Eleni Christofi	6	6
14	(Japan) Mayuka Aikawa	3	4

==== Seventh qualifier ====
First round
7	(Switzerland) Ylena In-Albon	6	6
WC	(France) Jade Bornay	4	1
(Belarus) Nika Shytkouskaya	2	6	6
16	(China) Cao Siqi	6	2	2

Qualifying competition
7	(Switzerland) Ylena In-Albon	6	2	6
(Belarus) Nika Shytkouskaya	2	6	1

==== Eighth qualifier ====
First round
8	(Belgium) Lara Salden	1	6	6
(Italy) Federica Bilardo	6	2	6
WC	(France) Juliette Colard	2	0
11	(Czech Republic) Johana Marková	6	6

Qualifying competition
(Italy) Federica Bilardo	6	6
11	(Czech Republic) Johana Marková	4	2
