= 2016 French Open – Boys' singles =

Boys' singles
- 2016 French Open

Final
- Champion: (France) Geoffrey Blancaneaux
- Runner-up: (Canada) Félix Auger-Aliassime
- Score: 1–6, 6–3, 8–6

Events
Singles	men	women		boys	girls
Doubles	men	women	mixed	boys	girls
WC Singles	men	women	quad
WC Doubles	men	women	quad
Legends	−45	45+	women
← 2015 ·	French Open	· 2017 →

Geoffrey Blancaneaux won the title, defeating Félix Auger-Aliassime in the final, 1–6, 6–3, 8–6. He saved three championship points and became the first French player to win the junior title since Gaël Monfils in 2004.

Tommy Paul was the defending champion, but was no longer eligible to compete in junior events. He participated in the men's singles qualifying competition, where he lost to Peter Gojowczyk in the second round.

== Seeds ==
1. (Greece) Stefanos Tsitsipas (quarterfinals)
2. (Hungary) Máté Valkusz (third round)
3. (United States) Ulises Blanch (second round)
4. (Japan) Yosuke Watanuki (first round)
5. (Canada) Denis Shapovalov (semifinals)
6. (Australia) Alex de Minaur (second round)
7. (South Korea) Chung Yun-seong (second round)
8. (Uzbekistan) Jurabek Karimov (third round)
9. (Serbia) Miomir Kecmanović (third round)
10. (Norway) Casper Ruud (second round)
11. (Canada) Félix Auger-Aliassime (final)
12. (Austria) Jurij Rodionov (second round)
13. (China) Wu Yibing (second round)
14. (Argentina) Genaro Alberto Olivieri (quarterfinals)
15. (United States) John McNally (second round)
16. (Egypt) Youssef Hossam (first round)

== Draw ==
=== Key ===
- Q = Qualifier
- WC = Wild card
- LL = Lucky loser
- Alt = Alternate
- ITF = ITF entry
- PR = Protected ranking
- SR = Special ranking
- SE = Special exempt
- JE = Junior exempt
- JR = Junior Accelerator Programme entrant
- CO = College Accelerator Programme entrant
- NG = Next Gen Accelerator Program entrant
- w/o = Walkover
- r = Retired
- d = Defaulted

=== Finals ===
Quarterfinals
1	(Greece) Stefanos Tsitsipas	4	2
5	(Canada) Denis Shapovalov	6	6
(France) Geoffrey Blancaneaux	6	7
(Canada) Benjamin Sigouin	3	5
(Spain) Nicola Kuhn	2	6	6
Q	(Germany) Marvin Möller	6	3	3
11	(Canada) Félix Auger-Aliassime	6	7
14	(Argentina) Genaro Alberto Olivieri	3	5

Semifinals
5	(Canada) Denis Shapovalov	7^{7}	5	3
(France) Geoffrey Blancaneaux	6^{4}	7	6
(Spain) Nicola Kuhn	4	2
11	(Canada) Félix Auger-Aliassime	6	6

Final
(France) Geoffrey Blancaneaux	1	6	8
11	(Canada) Félix Auger-Aliassime	6	3	6

=== Top half ===
==== Section 1 ====
First round
1	(Greece) Stefanos Tsitsipas	4	6	6
(Germany) Daniel Altmaier	6	1	3
Q	(France) Valentin Vacherot	6	6
WC	(Brazil) Rafael Lima Wagner	1	4
SE	(Australia) Blake Ellis	6	6
Q	(Spain) Alejandro Davidovich Fokina	3	4
(United States) Nathan Ponwith	7^{7}	6
16	(Egypt) Youssef Hossam	6^{5}	4
9	(Serbia) Miomir Kecmanović	6	6
(Japan) Toru Horie	1	1
Q	(Italy) Riccardo Balzerani	7^{7}	6
(Poland) Piotr Matuszewski	6^{5}	2
(United States) Sam Riffice	5	6	1
(Czech Republic) Patrik Rikl	7	3	6
WC	(France) Maxence Brovillé	1	3
5	(Canada) Denis Shapovalov	6	6

Second round
1	(Greece) S Tsitsipas	6	6
Q	(France) V Vacherot	2	4
SE	(Australia) B Ellis	2	5
(United States) N Ponwith	6	7
9	(Serbia) M Kecmanović	6	7^{7}
Q	(Italy) R Balzerani	3	6^{4}
(Czech Republic) P Rikl	3	1
5	(Canada) D Shapovalov	6	6

Third round
1	(Greece) S Tsitsipas	6	2	6
(United States) N Ponwith	1	6	2
9	(Serbia) M Kecmanović	7	3	2
5	(Canada) D Shapovalov	5	6	6

Quarterfinals
1	(Greece) S Tsitsipas	4	2
5	(Canada) D Shapovalov	6	6

==== Section 2 ====
First round
4	(Japan) Yosuke Watanuki	3	3
(France) Geoffrey Blancaneaux	6	6
(Germany) Louis Wessels	7^{10}	6
(United Kingdom) Ryan James Storrie	6^{8}	1
(Uzbekistan) Khumoun Sultanov	5	2
WC	(France) Corentin Moutet	7	6
(Russia) Pavel Kotov	2	4
15	(United States) John McNally	6	6
12	(Austria) Jurij Rodionov	6	4	7
(United States) Vasil Kirkov	1	6	5
Q	(Argentina) Francisco Vittar	6^{0}	1
(Canada) Benjamin Sigouin	7^{7}	6
(France) Dan Added	4	2
(Australia) Alexei Popyrin	6	6
(Brazil) Felipe Meligeni Alves	3	4
7	(South Korea) Chung Yun-seong	6	6

Second round
(France) G Blancaneaux	7^{7}	3	6
(Germany) L Wessels	6^{1}	6	3
WC	(France) C Moutet	6	7^{7}
15	(United States) J McNally	3	6^{3}
12	(Austria) J Rodionov	4	3
(Canada) B Sigouin	6	6
(Australia) A Popyrin	2	6	6
7	(South Korea) Y-s Chung	6	2	4

Third round
(France) G Blancaneaux	7	3	7
WC	(France) C Moutet	5	6	5
(Canada) B Sigouin	5	6	13
(Australia) A Popyrin	7	4	11

Quarterfinals
(France) G Blancaneaux	6	7
(Canada) B Sigouin	3	5

=== Bottom half ===
==== Section 3 ====
First round
6	(Australia) Alex de Minaur	6	6
(Argentina) Tomás Martín Etcheverry	4	2
(Poland) Kacper Żuk	6	3	3
(Spain) Nicola Kuhn	4	6	6
Q	(United States) Gianni Ross	6	5	6
(Japan) Yuta Shimizu	4	7	1
WC	(France) Evan Furness	4	4
10	(Norway) Casper Ruud	6	6
13	(China) Wu Yibing	7^{7}	6
(United Kingdom) Jay Clarke	6^{5}	4
Q	(Germany) Marvin Möller	7^{7}	6
(Brazil) Gabriel Décamps	6^{5}	3
(Philippines) Alberto Lim	6	3	6
WC	(France) Constantin Bittoun Kouzmine	1	6	2
(Portugal) Duarte Vale	2	2
3	(United States) Ulises Blanch	6	6

Second round
6	(Australia) A de Minaur	1	6	2
(Spain) N Kuhn	6	2	6
Q	(United States) G Ross	7^{11}	6
10	(Norway) C Ruud	6^{9}	3
13	(China) Y Wu	4	4
Q	(Germany) M Möller	6	6
(Philippines) A Lim	6	6
3	(United States) U Blanch	3	1

Third round
(Spain) N Kuhn	7	6
Q	(United States) G Ross	5	2
Q	(Germany) M Möller	6	6
(Philippines) A Lim	2	1

Quarterfinals
(Spain) N Kuhn	2	6	6
Q	(Germany) M Möller	6	3	3

==== Section 4 ====
First round
8	(Uzbekistan) Jurabek Karimov	6	6
(United States) Liam Caruana	4	3
(Estonia) Kenneth Raisma	6^{6}	5
Q	(Israel) Yshai Oliel	7^{8}	7
(France) Louis Tessa	4	2
(Brazil) Orlando Luz	6	6
(United States) J. J. Wolf	2	1
11	(Canada) Félix Auger-Aliassime	6	6
14	(Argentina) Genaro Alberto Olivieri	6	7
Q	(Turkey) Ergi Kırkın	2	5
WC	(France) Elliot Benchetrit	7	6
(Spain) Eduard Güell Batrina	5	0
(Bolivia) Juan Carlos Aguilar	6	6
WC	(United States) Brandon Holt	3	2
WC	(France) Matteo Martineau	4	7	5
2	(Hungary) Máté Valkusz	6	5	7

Second round
8	(Uzbekistan) J Karimov	6^{6}	6	6
Q	(Israel) Y Oliel	7^{8}	2	2
(Brazil) O Luz	6	2	1
11	(Canada) F Auger-Aliassime	3	6	6
14	(Argentina) GA Olivieri	6	6^{5}	6
WC	(France) E Benchetrit	2	7^{7}	3
(Bolivia) JC Aguilar	1	1
2	(Hungary) M Valkusz	6	6

Third round
8	(Uzbekistan) J Karimov	6^{2}	1
11	(Canada) F Auger-Aliassime	7^{7}	6
14	(Argentina) GA Olivieri	6	6
2	(Hungary) M Valkusz	4	1

Quarterfinals
11	(Canada) F Auger-Aliassime	6	7
14	(Argentina) GA Olivieri	3	5

== Qualifying ==
=== Seeds ===
1. (Spain) Alejandro Davidovich Fokina (qualified)
2. (Germany) Marvin Möller (qualified)
3. (Chinese Taipei) Wu Tung-lin (first round)
4. (Turkey) Ergi Kırkın (qualified)
5. (United Kingdom) Alexis Canter (first round)
6. (United Kingdom) Alastair Gray (first round)
7. (Israel) Yshai Oliel (qualified)
8. (North Macedonia) Bojan Jankulovski (first round)
9. (Argentina) Francisco Vittar (qualified)
10. (China) Zhao Lingxi (first round)
11. (United States) Oliver Crawford (qualifying competition)
12. (Estonia) Mattias Siimar (qualifying competition)
13. (Slovakia) Lukáš Klein (first round)
14. (Argentina) Juan Martín Jalif (first round)
15. (United States) Lucas Koelle (qualifying competition)
16. (Portugal) Tiago Cação (first round)

=== Qualifiers ===
1. (Spain) Alejandro Davidovich Fokina
2. (Germany) Marvin Möller
3. (United States) Gianni Ross
4. (Turkey) Ergi Kırkın
5. (Argentina) Francisco Vittar
6. (Italy) Riccardo Balzerani
7. (Israel) Yshai Oliel
8. (France) Valentin Vacherot

=== Draw ===
==== First qualifier ====
First round
1	(Spain) Alejandro Davidovich Fokina	6	6
WC	(France) Clément Tabur	4	4
(Italy) Corrado Summaria	7^{7}	6
14	(Argentina) Juan Martín Jalif	6^{2}	4

Qualifying competition
1	(Spain) Alejandro Davidovich Fokina	3	6	6
(Italy) Corrado Summaria	6	3	4

==== Second qualifier ====
First round
2	(Germany) Marvin Möller	4	6	6
(Romania) Vlad Andrei Dancu	6	2	2
WC	(France) Constant de la Bassetière	7^{7}	6
10	(China) Zhao Lingxi	6^{4}	2

Qualifying competition
2	(Germany) Marvin Möller	6	6
WC	(France) Constant de la Bassetière	1	4

==== Third qualifier ====
First round
3	(Chinese Taipei) Wu Tung-lin	4	6	1
(United States) Gianni Ross	6	3	6
(United Kingdom) Ewan Moore	6^{3}	3
12	(Estonia) Mattias Siimar	7^{7}	6

Qualifying competition
(United States) Gianni Ross	6	6
12	(Estonia) Mattias Siimar	1	0

==== Fourth qualifier ====
First round
4	(Turkey) Ergi Kırkın	6	6
WC	(France) Jaimee Floyd Angele	2	1
(Hungary) Zsombor Piros	6	6
13	(Slovakia) Lukáš Klein	1	4

Qualifying competition
4	(Turkey) Ergi Kırkın	7	7^{7}
(Hungary) Zsombor Piros	5	6^{4}

==== Fifth qualifier ====
First round
5	(United Kingdom) Alexis Canter	3	4
WC	(France) Hugo Gaston	6	6
(China) Lyu Chengze	6	0	6^{0}
9	(Argentina) Francisco Vittar	4	6	7^{7}

Qualifying competition
WC	(France) Hugo Gaston	4	6	3
9	(Argentina) Francisco Vittar	6	2	6

==== Sixth qualifier ====
First round
6	(United Kingdom) Alastair Gray	5	6	1
(Italy) Riccardo Balzerani	7	4	6
WC	(France) Louis Dussin	6	6
16	(Portugal) Tiago Cação	2	4

Qualifying competition
(Italy) Riccardo Balzerani	6	6
WC	(France) Louis Dussin	0	2

==== Seventh qualifier ====
First round
7	(Israel) Yshai Oliel	7	6
(Germany) Tim Rühl	5	3
(China) Wang Chukang	6	3	1
11	(United States) Oliver Crawford	4	6	6

Qualifying competition
7	(Israel) Yshai Oliel	6^{2}	6	6
11	(United States) Oliver Crawford	7^{7}	1	4

==== Eighth qualifier ====
First round
8	(North Macedonia) Bojan Jankulovski	4	6^{10}
WC	(France) Valentin Vacherot	6	7^{12}
(Hungary) Ákos Kotormán	4	1
15	(United States) Lucas Koelle	6	6

Qualifying competition
WC	(France) Valentin Vacherot	6	6
15	(United States) Lucas Koelle	3	2
