= Olesya Pervushina =

Russian tennis player

Olesya Pervushina Олеся Первушина
- Full name: Olesya Sergeyevna Pervushina
- Country (sports): Russia
- Residence: Tambov, Russia
- Born: 29 April 2000 (age 26) Khabarovsk, Russia
- Plays: Right-handed (two-handed backhand)
- Prize money: $41,792

Singles
- Career record: 47–24
- Career titles: 4 ITF
- Highest ranking: No. 348 (17 April 2017)

Doubles
- Career record: 28–14
- Career titles: 4 ITF
- Highest ranking: No. 217 (12 June 2017)

Olesya Sergeyevna Pervushina (Russian: Олеся Сергеевна Первушина; born 29 April 2000) is a Russian former tennis player.

She is noted for her serve and powerful groundstrokes. Pervushina has achieved a career-high junior ranking of No. 1, on 6 June 2016. In May 2016, she won the Trofeo Bonfiglio, a Grade-A tournament in Milan, Italy.

Pervushina won four singles titles and four doubles titles on the ITF Women's Circuit. On 17 April 2017, she reached her best singles ranking of world No. 348. On 12 June 2017, she peaked at No. 217 in the doubles rankings. Pervushina made her WTA Tour main-draw debut at the 2016 Pan Pacific Open, where she lost to Magda Linette in three sets.

== ITF Circuit finals ==
=== Singles: 4 (4 titles) ===
Legend $25,000 tournaments $10,000 tournaments	Finals by surface Clay (4–0)

Result	No.	Date	Tournament	Surface	Opponent	Score
Win	1.	8 November 2015	ITF Pula, Italy	Clay	(Italy) Anastasia Grymalska	2–6, 7–5, 6–1
Win	2.	17 April 2016	ITF Pula, Italy	Clay	(Italy) Bianca Turati	7–6^{(1)}, 6–3
Win	3.	15 May 2016	ITF Pula, Italy	Clay	(Italy) Corinna Dentoni	6–3, 3–6, 7–5
Win	4.	21 August 2016	ITF Leipzig, Germany	Clay	(Austria) Julia Grabher	7–6^{(4)}, 3–6, 7–5

=== Doubles: 6 (4 titles, 2 runner-ups) ===
Legend $25,000 tournaments $15,000 tournaments $10,000 tournaments	Finals by surface Hard (1–0) Clay (3–2)

Result	No.	Date	Tournament	Surface	Partner	Opponents	Score
Win	1.	31 October 2015	ITF Pula, Italy	Clay	(Italy) Federica Bilardo	(Slovakia) Nikola Dolaková (Slovakia) Barbora Kotelesová	6–3, 6–4
Loss	1.	5 November 2015	ITF Pula, Italy	Clay	(Italy) Federica Bilardo	(Italy) Martina di Giuseppe (Italy) Anastasia Grymalska	2–6, 4–6
Loss	2.	22 January 2017	ITF Antalya, Turkey	Clay	(Russia) Aleksandra Pospelova	(Colombia) María Fernanda Herazo (Ukraine) Kateryna Sliusar	6–7^{(1)}, 0–6
Win	2.	25 March 2017	ITF Pula, Italy	Clay	(Ukraine) Dayana Yastremska	(United Kingdom) Tara Moore (Switzerland) Conny Perrin	6–4, 6–4
Win	3.	6 May 2017	ITF Khimki, Russia	Hard (i)	(Russia) Anastasia Potapova	(Russia) Ekaterina Kazionova (Russia) Daria Kruzhkova	6–0, 6–1
Win	4.	19 May 2017	Solgironès Open, Spain	Clay	(Ukraine) Valeriya Strakhova	(Romania) Jaqueline Cristian (Mexico) Renata Zarazúa	7–5, 6–2

== Junior Grand Slam tournament finals ==
=== Doubles: 2 (2 runner-ups) ===
Result	Year	Tournament	Surface	Partner	Opponents	Score
Loss	2016	French Open	Clay	(Russia) Anastasia Potapova	(Spain) Paula Arias Manjón (Serbia) Olga Danilović	6–3, 3–6, [8–10]
Loss	2017	French Open	Clay	(Russia) Anastasia Potapova	(Canada) Bianca Andreescu (Canada) Carson Branstine	1–6, 3–6

== Awards ==
2016

- The Russian Cup in the nomination Girls Under-18 Team of the Year
