= 2016 French Open – Wheelchair women's singles =

Wheelchair women's singles
- 2016 French Open

Final
- Champion: (Netherlands) Marjolein Buis
- Runner-up: (Germany) Sabine Ellerbrock
- Score: 6–3, 6–4

Events
Singles	men	women		boys	girls
Doubles	men	women	mixed	boys	girls
WC Singles	men	women	quad
WC Doubles	men	women	quad
Legends	−45	45+	women
- French Open

Marjolein Buis defeated Sabine Ellerbrock in the final, 6–3, 6–4 to win the women's singles wheelchair tennis title at the 2016 French Open.

Jiske Griffioen was the defending champion, but was defeated in the quarterfinals by Jordanne Whiley.

== Seeds ==
1. (Netherlands) Jiske Griffioen (quarterfinals)
2. (Japan) Yui Kamiji (semifinals)

== Draw ==
Key

- Q = Qualifier
- WC = Wild card
- LL = Lucky loser
- Alt = Alternate
- ITF = ITF entry
- PR = Protected ranking
- SR = Special ranking
- SE = Special exempt
- JE = Junior exempt
- JR = Junior Accelerator Programme entrant
- CO = College Accelerator Programme entrant
- NG = Next Gen Accelerator Program entrant
- w/o = Walkover
- r = Retired
- d = Defaulted

=== Finals ===
Quarterfinals
1	(Netherlands) Jiske Griffioen	0	6	3
(United Kingdom) Jordanne Whiley	6	2	6
(Germany) Sabine Ellerbrock	6	6
WC	(France) Charlotte Famin	4	2
(United Kingdom) Lucy Shuker	1	6	2
(Netherlands) Marjolein Buis	6	4	6
(Netherlands) Aniek van Koot	6	0	3
2	(Japan) Yui Kamiji	2	6	6

Semifinals
(United Kingdom) Jordanne Whiley	3	6	4
(Germany) Sabine Ellerbrock	6	1	6
(Netherlands) Marjolein Buis	7^{7}	6^{3}	6
2	(Japan) Yui Kamiji	6^{5}	7^{7}	1

Final
(Germany) Sabine Ellerbrock	3	4
(Netherlands) Marjolein Buis	6	6
