= 2016 French Open – Girls' doubles =

Girls' doubles
- 2016 French Open

Final
- Champions: (Spain) Paula Arias Manjón (Serbia) Olga Danilović
- Runners-up: (Russia) Olesya Pervushina (Russia) Anastasia Potapova
- Score: 3–6, 6–3, [10–8]

Events
Singles	men	women		boys	girls
Doubles	men	women	mixed	boys	girls
WC Singles	men	women	quad
WC Doubles	men	women	quad
Legends	−45	45+	women
← 2015 ·	French Open	· 2017 →

Paula Arias Manjón and Olga Danilović won the title, defeating Olesya Pervushina and Anastasia Potapova in the final, 3–6, 6–3, [10–8].

Miriam Kolodziejová and Markéta Vondroušová were the defending champions, but Kolodziejová was no longer eligible to participate in junior events. Vondroušová played alongside Anastasia Dețiuc, but lost in the first round to Claire Liu and Charlotte Robillard-Millette.

== Seeds ==
1. (Russia) Olesya Pervushina / (Russia) Anastasia Potapova (final)
2. (United States) Usue Maitane Arconada / (United States) Kayla Day (second round)
3. (Russia) Amina Anshba / (Russia) Elena Rybakina (first round)
4. (United Kingdom) Emily Appleton / (United Kingdom) Katie Swan (withdrew)
5. (United States) Sofia Kenin / (United States) Alexandra Sanford (second round)
6. (United Kingdom) Jodie Burrage / (Hungary) Panna Udvardy (first round)
7. (Japan) Mai Hontama / (China) Zheng Wushuang (first round)
8. (Moldova) Anastasia Dețiuc / (Czech Republic) Markéta Vondroušová (first round)

== Draw ==
=== Key ===
- Q = Qualifier
- WC = Wild card
- LL = Lucky loser
- Alt = Alternate
- SE = Special exempt
- PR = Protected ranking
- ITF = ITF entry
- JE = Junior exempt
- w/o = Walkover
- r = Retired
- d = Defaulted
- SR = Special ranking

=== Finals ===
Semifinals
1	(Russia) Olesya Pervushina (Russia) Anastasia Potapova	6	6
(Italy) Tatiana Pieri (Italy) Lucrezia Stefanini	3	1
(Japan) Mayuka Aikawa (Switzerland) Ylena In-Albon	3	3
(Spain) Paula Arias Manjón (Serbia) Olga Danilović	6	6

Final
1	(Russia) Olesya Pervushina (Russia) Anastasia Potapova	6	3	[8]
(Spain) Paula Arias Manjón (Serbia) Olga Danilović	3	6	[10]

=== Top half ===
First round
1	(Russia) Olesya Pervushina (Russia) Anastasia Potapova	6	6
(Colombia) Emiliana Arango (United States) Morgan Coppoc	2	0
WC	(France) Jade Bornay (France) Diane Parry	6	6
(Australia) Baijing Lin (Ukraine) Anastasia Zarytska	3	4
(Japan) Yuki Naito (Japan) Ayano Shimizu	1	2
(Greece) Eleni Christofi (Algeria) Inès Ibbou	6	6
(Czech Republic) Monika Kilnarová (Peru) Dominique Schaefer	6	3	[8]
5	(United States) Sofia Kenin (United States) Alexandra Sanford	4	6	[10]
4	(United Kingdom) Emily Appleton (United Kingdom) Katie Swan
(Romania) Georgia Crăciun (Romania) Oana Gavrilă	w/o
(Italy) Tatiana Pieri (Italy) Lucrezia Stefanini	6	6
(United States) Michaela Gordon (United States) Maria Mateas	4	3
WC	(France) Chloé Cirotte (France) Yasmine Mansouri	4	3
(Paraguay) Lara Escauriza (Romania) Ioana Mincă	6	6
(Italy) Federica Bilardo (Poland) Iga Świątek	6	3	[10]
6	(United Kingdom) Jodie Burrage (Hungary) Panna Udvardy	4	6	[2]

Second round
1	(Russia) O Pervushina (Russia) A Potapova	6	6
WC	(France) J Bornay (France) D Parry	2	0
(Greece) E Christofi (Algeria) I Ibbou	7	6^{6}	[10]
5	(United States) S Kenin (United States) A Sanford	5	7^{8}	[5]
(Romania) G Crăciun (Romania) O Gavrilă	6	4	[3]
(Italy) T Pieri (Italy) L Stefanini	3	6	[10]
(Paraguay) L Escauriza (Romania) I Mincă	4	2
(Italy) F Bilardo (Poland) I Świątek	6	6

Quarterfinals
1	(Russia) O Pervushina (Russia) A Potapova	7	7
(Greece) E Christofi (Algeria) I Ibbou	5	5
(Italy) T Pieri (Italy) L Stefanini	6	7
(Italy) F Bilardo (Poland) I Świątek	4	5

Semifinals
1	(Russia) O Pervushina (Russia) A Potapova	6	6
(Italy) T Pieri (Italy) L Stefanini	3	1

=== Bottom half ===
First round
7	(Japan) Mai Hontama (China) Zheng Wushuang	2	6	[6]
(Japan) Mayuka Aikawa (Switzerland) Ylena In-Albon	6	3	[10]
WC	(France) Loudmilla Bencheikh (France) Mylène Halemai	3	4
(Austria) Mira Antonitsch (Sweden) Mirjam Björklund	6	6
(Norway) Malene Helgø (Ukraine) Katarina Zavatska	6^{2}	1
(United States) Amanda Anisimova (United States) Caty McNally	7^{7}	6
(Australia) Jaimee Fourlis (India) Karman Kaur Thandi	6	6
3	(Russia) Amina Anshba (Russia) Elena Rybakina	4	3
8	(Moldova) Anastasia Dețiuc (Czech Republic) Markéta Vondroušová	3	6	[2]
(United States) Claire Liu (Canada) Charlotte Robillard-Millette	6	1	[10]
(Japan) Ayumi Miyamoto (Japan) Chihiro Muramatsu	2	6	[10]
(Russia) Varvara Gracheva (Czech Republic) Lucie Kaňková	6	1	[4]
(Argentina) María Lourdes Carlé (Argentina) Melany Krywoj	1	4
(Spain) Paula Arias Manjón (Serbia) Olga Danilović	6	6
WC	(France) Juliette Colard (France) Manon Léonard	1	4
2	(United States) Usue Maitane Arconada (United States) Kayla Day	6	6

Second round
(Japan) M Aikawa (Switzerland) Y In-Albon	6	4	[10]
(Austria) M Antonitsch (Sweden) M Björklund	3	6	[7]
(United States) A Anisimova (United States) C McNally	6	5	[9]
(Australia) J Fourlis (India) KK Thandi	4	7	[11]
(United States) C Liu (Canada) C Robillard-Millette	3	6^{4}
(Japan) A Miyamoto (Japan) C Muramatsu	6	7^{7}
(Spain) P Arias Manjón (Serbia) O Danilović	7^{7}	4	[10]
2	(United States) UM Arconada (United States) K Day	6^{5}	6	[8]

Quarterfinals
(Japan) M Aikawa (Switzerland) Y In-Albon	6	6
(Australia) J Fourlis (India) KK Thandi	0	2
(Japan) A Miyamoto (Japan) C Muramatsu	1	2
(Spain) P Arias Manjón (Serbia) O Danilović	6	6

Semifinals
(Japan) M Aikawa (Switzerland) Y In-Albon	3	3
(Spain) P Arias Manjón (Serbia) O Danilović	6	6
