= 2016 French Open – Boys' doubles =

Boys' doubles
- 2016 French Open

Final
- Champions: (Israel) Yshai Oliel (Czech Republic) Patrik Rikl
- Runners-up: (South Korea) Chung Yun-seong (Brazil) Orlando Luz
- Score: 6–3, 6–4

Events
Singles	men	women		boys	girls
Doubles	men	women	mixed	boys	girls
WC Singles	men	women	quad
WC Doubles	men	women	quad
Legends	−45	45+	women
- French Open

Álvaro López San Martín and Jaume Munar were the defending champions, but were no longer eligible to participate.

Yishai Oliel of Israel and Patrik Rikl of the Czech Republic won the title, defeating Chung Yun-seong and Orlando Luz in the final, 6–3, 6–4.

== Seeds ==
1. (United States) Ulises Blanch / (Hungary) Máté Valkusz (second round)
2. (Canada) Félix Auger-Aliassime / (Canada) Denis Shapovalov (second round)
3. (Serbia) Miomir Kecmanović / (Norway) Casper Ruud (semifinals)
4. (United Kingdom) Jay Clarke / (Greece) Stefanos Tsitsipas (quarterfinals)
5. (Egypt) Youssef Hossam / (Uzbekistan) Jurabek Karimov (quarterfinals)
6. (Australia) Alexei Popyrin / (China) Wu Yibing (first round)
7. (United States) John McNally / (United States) J. J. Wolf (quarterfinals)
8. (Spain) Alejandro Davidovich Fokina / (Japan) Yosuke Watanuki (first round)

== Draw ==
Key

- Q = Qualifier
- WC = Wild card
- LL = Lucky loser
- Alt = Alternate
- ITF = ITF entry
- PR = Protected ranking
- SR = Special ranking
- SE = Special exempt
- JE = Junior exempt
- JR = Junior Accelerator Programme entrant
- CO = College Accelerator Programme entrant
- NG = Next Gen Accelerator Program entrant
- w/o = Walkover
- r = Retired
- d = Defaulted

=== Finals ===
Semifinals
(Australia) Alex de Minaur (Australia) Blake Ellis	6	4	[4]
(Israel) Yshai Oliel (Czech Republic) Patrik Rikl	4	6	[10]
3	(Serbia) Miomir Kecmanović (Norway) Casper Ruud	4	7^{7}	[9]
(South Korea) Chung Yun-seong (Brazil) Orlando Luz	6	6^{5}	[11]

Final
(Israel) Yshai Oliel (Czech Republic) Patrik Rikl	6	6
(South Korea) Chung Yun-seong (Brazil) Orlando Luz	3	4

=== Top half ===
First round
1	(United States) Ulises Blanch (Hungary) Máté Valkusz	4	6	[10]
(United States) Brandon Holt (United States) Vasil Kirkov	6	4	[7]
(Italy) Riccardo Balzerani (Japan) Yuta Shimizu	6	6
(United States) Liam Caruana (United States) Sam Riffice	2	2
(Japan) Toru Horie (United States) Gianni Ross	5	3
(Australia) Alex de Minaur (Australia) Blake Ellis	7	6
WC	(France) Dan Added (France) Matteo Martineau	6	4	[10]
8	(Spain) Alejandro Davidovich Fokina (Japan) Yosuke Watanuki	3	6	[6]
4	(United Kingdom) Jay Clarke (Greece) Stefanos Tsitsipas	7^{9}	6
(Uzbekistan) Khumoun Sultanov (Chinese Taipei) Wu Tung-lin	6^{7}	1
(Spain) Eduard Güella Bartrina (Spain) Nicola Kuhn	6	7^{7}
(Turkey) Ergi Kırkın (Philippines) Alberto Lim	2	6^{4}
(Russia) Pavel Kotov (United States) Nathan Ponwith	6	6
WC	(France) Maxence Brovillé (France) Constant de la Bassetière	2	3
(Israel) Yshai Oliel (Czech Republic) Patrik Rikl	6	6
6	(Australia) Alexei Popyrin (China) Wu Yibing	1	4

Second round
1	(United States) U Blanch (Hungary) M Valkusz	6	3	[7]
(Italy) R Balzerani (Japan) Y Shimizu	4	6	[10]
(Australia) A de Minaur (Australia) B Ellis	6	4	[10]
WC	(France) D Added (France) M Martineau	3	6	[4]
4	(United Kingdom) J Clarke (Greece) S Tsitsipas	w/o
(Spain) E Güella Bartrina (Spain) N Kuhn
(Russia) P Kotov (United States) N Ponwith	2	4
(Israel) Y Oliel (Czech Republic) P Rikl	6	6

Quarterfinals
(Italy) R Balzerani (Japan) Y Shimizu	3	1
(Australia) A De Minaur (Australia) B Ellis	6	6
4	(United Kingdom) J Clarke (Greece) S Tsitsipas	6^{8}	6	[8]
(Israel) Y Oliel (Czech Republic) P Rikl	7^{10}	2	[10]

Semifinals
(Australia) A De Minaur (Australia) B Ellis	6	4	[4]
(Israel) Y Oliel (Czech Republic) P Rikl	4	6	[10]

=== Bottom half ===
First round
5	(Egypt) Youssef Hossam (Uzbekistan) Jurabek Karimov	7	6
(Brazil) Gabriel Décamps (Portugal) Duarte Vale	5	4
(Austria) Jurij Rodionov (France) Louis Tessa	6	6
(France) Constantin Bittoun Kouzmine (Germany) Marvin Möller	4	4
(Poland) Piotr Matuszewski (Poland) Kacper Żuk	6^{4}	5
(Canada) Benjamin Sigouin (Germany) Louis Wessels	7^{7}	7
WC	(France) Elliot Benchetrit (France) Evan Furness	3	6	[4]
3	(Serbia) Miomir Kecmanović (Norway) Casper Ruud	6	4	[10]
7	(United States) John McNally (United States) J. J. Wolf	6	1	[10]
(Bolivia) Juan Carlos Aguilar (Argentina) Genaro Alberto Olivieri	1	6	[8]
(France) Geoffrey Blancaneaux (Estonia) Kenneth Raisma	6	6
WC	(France) Jaimee Floyd Angel (France) Clément Tabur	0	1
(South Korea) Chung Yun-seong (Brazil) Orlando Luz	6	6^{7}	[10]
(Argentina) Juan Martín Jalif (Argentina) Francisco Vittar	3	7^{9}	[7]
(Brazil) Felipe Meligeni Alves (United Kingdom) Ryan James Storrie	4	4
2	(Canada) Félix Auger-Aliassime (Canada) Denis Shapovalov	6	6

Second round
5	(Egypt) Y Hossam (Uzbekistan) J Karimov	6	6
(Austria) J Rodionov (France) L Tessa	1	1
(Canada) B Sigouin (Germany) L Wessels	1	3
3	(Serbia) M Kecmanović (Norway) C Ruud	6	6
7	(United States) J McNally (United States) J. J. Wolf	w/o
(France) G Blancaneaux (Estonia) K Raisma
(South Korea) Y-s Chung (Brazil) O Luz	6	7^{7}
2	(Canada) F Auger-Aliassime (Canada) D Shapovalov	4	6^{2}

Quarterfinals
5	(Egypt) Y Hossam (Uzbekistan) J Karimov	4	4
3	(Serbia) M Kecmanović (Norway) C Ruud	6	6
7	(United States) J McNally (United States) J. J. Wolf	4	3
(South Korea) Y-s Chung (Brazil) O Luz	6	6

Semifinals
3	(Serbia) M Kecmanović (Norway) C Ruud	4	7^{7}	[9]
(South Korea) Y-s Chung (Brazil) O Luz	6	6^{5}	[11]
