= 2016 French Open – Wheelchair men's singles =

Wheelchair men's singles
- 2016 French Open

Final
- Champion: (Argentina) Gustavo Fernández
- Runner-up: (United Kingdom) Gordon Reid
- Score: 7–6^{(7–4)}, 6–1

Events
Singles	men	women		boys	girls
Doubles	men	women	mixed	boys	girls
WC Singles	men	women	quad
WC Doubles	men	women	quad
Legends	−45	45+	women
- French Open

Gustavo Fernández defeated Gordon Reid in the final, 7–6^{(7–4)}, 6–1 to win the men's singles wheelchair tennis title at the 2016 French Open. It was his first major singles title.

Shingo Kunieda was the two-time defending champion, but was defeated by Fernández in the semifinals.

== Seeds ==
1. (France) Stéphane Houdet (semifinals)
2. (Belgium) Joachim Gérard (quarterfinals)

== Draw ==
Key

- Q = Qualifier
- WC = Wild card
- LL = Lucky loser
- Alt = Alternate
- ITF = ITF entry
- PR = Protected ranking
- SR = Special ranking
- SE = Special exempt
- JE = Junior exempt
- JR = Junior Accelerator Programme entrant
- CO = College Accelerator Programme entrant
- NG = Next Gen Accelerator Program entrant
- w/o = Walkover
- r = Retired
- d = Defaulted

=== Finals ===
Quarterfinals
1	(France) Stéphane Houdet	6	6
WC	(France) Michaël Jeremiasz	1	4
(United Kingdom) Gordon Reid	7	6
(France) Nicolas Peifer	5	3
(Sweden) Stefan Olsson	3	1
(Argentina) Gustavo Fernández	6	6
(Japan) Shingo Kunieda	3	6	6
2	(Belgium) Joachim Gérard	6	3	2

Semifinals
1	(France) Stéphane Houdet	3	4
(United Kingdom) Gordon Reid	6	6
(Argentina) Gustavo Fernández	6	6
(Japan) Shingo Kunieda	3	2

Final
(United Kingdom) Gordon Reid	6^{4}	1
(Argentina) Gustavo Fernández	7^{7}	6
