= 2016 French Open – Wheelchair women's doubles =

Wheelchair women's doubles
- 2016 French Open

Final
- Champions: (Japan) Yui Kamiji (United Kingdom) Jordanne Whiley
- Runners-up: (Netherlands) Jiske Griffioen (Netherlands) Aniek van Koot
- Score: 6–4, 4–6, [10–6]

Events
Singles	men	women		boys	girls
Doubles	men	women	mixed	boys	girls
WC Singles	men	women	quad
WC Doubles	men	women	quad
Legends	−45	45+	women
- French Open

Yui Kamiji and Jordanne Whiley defeated the defending champions Jiske Griffioen and Aniek van Koot in the final, 6–4, 4–6, [10–6] to win the women's doubles wheelchair tennis title at the 2016 French Open. It was the third consecutive year that the two teams contested the final.

== Seeds ==
1. (Netherlands) Jiske Griffioen / (Netherlands) Aniek van Koot (final)
2. (Japan) Yui Kamiji / (United Kingdom) Jordanne Whiley (champions)

== Draw ==
Key

- Q = Qualifier
- WC = Wild card
- LL = Lucky loser
- Alt = Alternate
- ITF = ITF entry
- PR = Protected ranking
- SR = Special ranking
- SE = Special exempt
- JE = Junior exempt
- JR = Junior Accelerator Programme entrant
- CO = College Accelerator Programme entrant
- NG = Next Gen Accelerator Program entrant
- w/o = Walkover
- r = Retired
- d = Defaulted

=== Finals ===
Semifinals
1	(Netherlands) Jiske Griffioen (Netherlands) Aniek van Koot	6	6
(Germany) Sabine Ellerbrock (France) Charlotte Famin	3	4
(Netherlands) Marjolein Buis (United Kingdom) Lucy Shuker	6	4	[3]
2	(Japan) Yui Kamiji (United Kingdom) Jordanne Whiley	4	6	[10]

Final
1	(Netherlands) Jiske Griffioen (Netherlands) Aniek van Koot	3	6	[6]
2	(Japan) Yui Kamiji (United Kingdom) Jordanne Whiley	6	4	[10]
