= 2016 French Open – Wheelchair men's doubles =

Wheelchair men's doubles
- 2016 French Open

Final
- Champions: (Japan) Shingo Kunieda (United Kingdom) Gordon Reid
- Runners-up: (France) Michaël Jeremiasz (Sweden) Stefan Olsson
- Score: 6–3, 6–2

Events
Singles	men	women		boys	girls
Doubles	men	women	mixed	boys	girls
WC Singles	men	women	quad
WC Doubles	men	women	quad
Legends	−45	45+	women
- French Open

Defending champions Shingo Kunieda and Gordon Reid defeated Michaël Jeremiasz and Stefan Olsson in the final, 6–3, 6–2 to win the men's doubles wheelchair tennis title at the 2016 French Open.

== Seeds ==
1. (France) Stéphane Houdet / (France) Nicolas Peifer (semifinals)
2. (Japan) Shingo Kunieda / (United Kingdom) Gordon Reid (champions)

== Draw ==
Key

- Q = Qualifier
- WC = Wild card
- LL = Lucky loser
- Alt = Alternate
- ITF = ITF entry
- PR = Protected ranking
- SR = Special ranking
- SE = Special exempt
- JE = Junior exempt
- JR = Junior Accelerator Programme entrant
- CO = College Accelerator Programme entrant
- NG = Next Gen Accelerator Program entrant
- w/o = Walkover
- r = Retired
- d = Defaulted

=== Finals ===
Semifinals
1	(France) Stéphane Houdet (France) Nicolas Peifer	4	4
(France) Michaël Jeremiasz (Sweden) Stefan Olsson	6	6
(Argentina) Gustavo Fernández (Belgium) Joachim Gérard	2	3
2	(Japan) Shingo Kunieda (United Kingdom) Gordon Reid	6	6

Final
(France) Michaël Jeremiasz (Sweden) Stefan Olsson	3	2
2	(Japan) Shingo Kunieda (United Kingdom) Gordon Reid	6	6
