= 2016 French Open – Men's doubles =

Men's doubles
- 2016 French Open

Final
- Champions: (Spain) Feliciano López (Spain) Marc López
- Runners-up: (United States) Bob Bryan (United States) Mike Bryan
- Score: 6–4, 6–7^{(6–8)}, 6–3

Details
- Draw: 64
- Seeds: 16

Events
Singles	men	women		boys	girls
Doubles	men	women	mixed	boys	girls
WC Singles	men	women	quad
WC Doubles	men	women	quad
Legends	−45	45+	women
← 2015 ·	French Open	· 2017 →

Feliciano López and Marc López defeated Bob and Mike Bryan in the final, 6–4, 6–7^{(6–8)}, 6–3 to win the men's doubles tennis title at the 2016 French Open.

Ivan Dodig and Marcelo Melo were the defending champions, but lost in the semifinals to López and López.

== Seeds ==
1. (France) Pierre-Hugues Herbert / (France) Nicolas Mahut (third round)
2. (Netherlands) Jean-Julien Rojer / (Romania) Horia Tecău (second round)
3. (Croatia) Ivan Dodig / (Brazil) Marcelo Melo (semifinals)
4. (United Kingdom) Jamie Murray / (Brazil) Bruno Soares (third round)
5. (United States) Bob Bryan / (United States) Mike Bryan (final)
6. (India) Rohan Bopanna / (Romania) Florin Mergea (quarterfinals)
7. (Canada) Vasek Pospisil / (United States) Jack Sock (second round)
8. (South Africa) Raven Klaasen / (United States) Rajeev Ram (second round)

9. (Poland) Łukasz Kubot / (Austria) Alexander Peya (semifinals)
10. (Philippines) Treat Huey / (Belarus) Max Mirnyi (third round)
11. (Finland) Henri Kontinen / (Australia) John Peers (second round)
12. (Czech Republic) Radek Štěpánek / (Serbia) Nenad Zimonjić (third round)
13. (Colombia) Juan Sebastián Cabal / (Colombia) Robert Farah (first round)
14. (Canada) Daniel Nestor / (Pakistan) Aisam-ul-Haq Qureshi (third round)
15. (Spain) Feliciano López / (Spain) Marc López (champions)
16. (Poland) Marcin Matkowski / (India) Leander Paes (quarterfinals)

== Draw ==
=== Key ===
- Q = Qualifier
- WC = Wild card
- LL = Lucky loser
- Alt = Alternate
- ITF = ITF entry
- PR = Protected ranking
- SR = Special ranking
- SE = Special exempt
- JE = Junior exempt
- JR = Junior Accelerator Programme entrant
- CO = College Accelerator Programme entrant
- NG = Next Gen Accelerator Program entrant
- w/o = Walkover
- r = Retired
- d = Defaulted

=== Finals ===
Quarterfinals
15	(Spain) Feliciano López (Spain) Marc López	3	6	7^{9}
WC	(France) Julien Benneteau (France) Édouard Roger-Vasselin	6	4	6^{7}
3	(Croatia) Ivan Dodig (Brazil) Marcelo Melo	6	6
6	(India) Rohan Bopanna (Romania) Florin Mergea	4	4
5	(United States) Bob Bryan (United States) Mike Bryan	7^{14}	6
16	(Poland) Marcin Matkowski (India) Leander Paes	6^{12}	3
9	(Poland) Łukasz Kubot (Austria) Alexander Peya	6	6
(Uruguay) Pablo Cuevas (Spain) Marcel Granollers	1	4

Semifinals
15	(Spain) Feliciano López (Spain) Marc López	6	3	7
3	(Croatia) Ivan Dodig (Brazil) Marcelo Melo	2	6	5
5	(United States) Bob Bryan (United States) Mike Bryan	7	6
9	(Poland) Łukasz Kubot (Austria) Alexander Peya	5	1

Final
15	(Spain) Feliciano López (Spain) Marc López	6	6^{6}	6
5	(United States) Bob Bryan (United States) Mike Bryan	4	7^{8}	3

=== Top half ===
==== Section 1 ====
First round
1	(France) P-H Herbert (France) N Mahut	6	6
(Australia) S Groth (Australia) B Tomic	3	3
(United States) D Kudla (Chile) J Peralta	6	6
WC	(France) M Bourgue (France) C Hemery	4	3
(Argentina) F Delbonis (Argentina) A Molteni	6	7
(Australia) J Millman (United Kingdom) K Skupski	1	5
(Argentina) G Durán (Argentina) M González	7^{9}	0	5
15	(Spain) F López (Spain) M López	6^{7}	6	7
10	(Philippines) T Huey (Belarus) M Mirnyi	6^{3}	7^{7}	6
(Italy) F Fognini (Italy) A Seppi	7^{7}	6^{5}	1
(Lithuania) R Berankis (Czech Republic) L Rosol	6^{3}	7^{11}	6
PR	(Brazil) M Demoliner (Croatia) M Draganja	7^{7}	6^{9}	4
(Spain) A Ramos-Viñolas (Czech Republic) J Veselý	0	6	6^{2}
WC	(France) J Benneteau (France) É Roger-Vasselin	6	4	7^{7}
(Brazil) T Bellucci (Slovakia) M Kližan	1	5
7	(Canada) V Pospisil (United States) J Sock	6	7

Second round
1	(France) P-H Herbert (France) N Mahut	6	7
(United States) D Kudla (Chile) J Peralta	2	5
(Argentina) F Delbonis (Argentina) A Molteni	1	2
15	(Spain) F López (Spain) M López	6	6
10	(Philippines) T Huey (Belarus) M Mirnyi	6	6
(Lithuania) R Berankis (Czech Republic) L Rosol	3	4
WC	(France) J Benneteau (France) É Roger-Vasselin	6^{3}	6	7
7	(Canada) V Pospisil (United States) J Sock	7^{7}	4	5

Third round
1	(France) P-H Herbert (France) N Mahut	6^{7}	1
15	(Spain) F López (Spain) M López	7^{9}	6
10	(Philippines) T Huey (Belarus) M Mirnyi	4	4
WC	(France) J Benneteau (France) É Roger-Vasselin	6	6

Quarterfinals
15	(Spain) F López (Spain) M López	3	6	7^{9}
WC	(France) J Benneteau (France) É Roger-Vasselin	6	4	6^{7}

==== Section 2 ====
First round
3	(Croatia) I Dodig (Brazil) M Melo	6	6
(Netherlands) R Haase (Serbia) V Troicki	0	3
(Netherlands) W Koolhof (Netherlands) M Middelkoop	4	5
WC	(France) T Lamasine (France) A Olivetti	6	7
(France) J Chardy (Spain) F Verdasco	2	4
(Argentina) L Mayer (Portugal) J Sousa	6	6
(Australia) C Guccione (Brazil) A Sá	4	7^{7}	6
13	(Colombia) JS Cabal (Colombia) R Farah	6	6^{5}	3
11	(Finland) H Kontinen (Australia) J Peers	6^{6}	6	7^{7}
(Spain) N Almagro (Spain) G García-López	7^{8}	4	6^{3}
PR	(United States) B Baker (New Zealand) M Daniell	6	6
PR	(Cyprus) M Baghdatis (Russia) D Tursunov	3	2
WC	(France) G Barrère (France) Q Halys	7	7
(Ukraine) D Molchanov (Israel) D Sela	5	5
WC	(France) S Robert (France) A Sidorenko	2	2
6	(India) R Bopanna (Romania) F Mergea	6	6

Second round
3	(Croatia) I Dodig (Brazil) M Melo	6	6
WC	(France) T Lamasine (France) A Olivetti	2	4
(Argentina) L Mayer (Portugal) J Sousa	1	7^{7}	3
(Australia) C Guccione (Brazil) A Sá	6	6^{5}	6
11	(Finland) H Kontinen (Australia) J Peers	3	4
PR	(United States) B Baker (New Zealand) M Daniell	6	6
WC	(France) G Barrère (France) Q Halys	3	4
6	(India) R Bopanna (Romania) F Mergea	6	6

Third round
3	(Croatia) I Dodig (Brazil) M Melo	6	6
(Australia) C Guccione (Brazil) A Sá	3	2
PR	(United States) B Baker (New Zealand) M Daniell	2	7^{7}	1
6	(India) R Bopanna (Romania) F Mergea	6	6^{4}	6

Quarterfinals
3	(Croatia) I Dodig (Brazil) M Melo	6	6
6	(India) R Bopanna (Romania) F Mergea	4	4

=== Bottom half ===
==== Section 3 ====
First round
5	(United States) B Bryan (United States) M Bryan	6	6
(Poland) M Fyrstenberg (Mexico) S González	2	3
(France) A Mannarino (France) L Pouille	2	6^{3}
(Austria) O Marach (France) F Martin	6	7^{7}
(Spain) P Carreño Busta (Spain) D Marrero	6	6
(Australia) N Kyrgios (Germany) A Zverev	3	4
(Serbia) D Lajović (Austria) D Thiem	3	2
12	(Czech Republic) R Štěpánek (Serbia) N Zimonjić	6	6
16	(Poland) M Matkowski (India) L Paes	7^{7}	7^{8}
(Belarus) A Bury (Uzbekistan) D Istomin	6^{3}	6^{6}
Alt	(Russia) M Elgin (Tunisia) M Jaziri	2	1
PR	(Austria) J Knowle (Germany) F Mayer	6	6
WC	(France) D Guez (France) V Millot	7	7
WC	(France) K de Schepper (France) M Teixeira	5	5
(Russia) E Donskoy (Russia) A Kuznetsov	3	3
4	(United Kingdom) J Murray (Brazil) B Soares	6	6

Second round
5	(United States) B Bryan (United States) M Bryan	6	7^{7}
(Austria) O Marach (France) F Martin	3	6^{1}
(Spain) P Carreño Busta (Spain) D Marrero	6^{6}	3^{r}
12	(Czech Republic) R Štěpánek (Serbia) N Zimonjić	7^{8}	2
16	(Poland) M Matkowski (India) L Paes	6	6
PR	(Austria) J Knowle (Germany) F Mayer	4	3
WC	(France) D Guez (France) V Millot	2	6^{5}
4	(United Kingdom) J Murray (Brazil) B Soares	6	7^{7}

Third round
5	(United States) B Bryan (United States) M Bryan	4	7^{8}	6
12	(Czech Republic) R Štěpánek (Serbia) N Zimonjić	6	6^{6}	3
16	(Poland) M Matkowski (India) L Paes	7^{7}	7^{7}
4	(United Kingdom) J Murray (Brazil) B Soares	6^{5}	6^{4}

Quarterfinals
5	(United States) B Bryan (United States) M Bryan	7^{14}	6
16	(Poland) M Matkowski (India) L Paes	6^{12}	3

==== Section 4 ====
First round
8	(South Africa) R Klaasen (United States) R Ram	6	7^{8}
PR	(Serbia) J Tipsarević (Russia) M Youzhny	4	6^{6}
(Croatia) M Pavić (New Zealand) M Venus	6^{4}	4
(United States) E Butorac (United States) S Lipsky	7^{7}	6
(United States) N Monroe (New Zealand) A Sitak	4	7^{7}	6
(Russia) T Gabashvili (Argentina) D Schwartzman	6	6^{3}	4
(Croatia) I Karlović (India) P Raja	1	2
9	(Poland) Ł Kubot (Austria) A Peya	6	6
14	(Canada) D Nestor (Pakistan) A-u-H Qureshi	7^{7}	6
(Spain) Í Cervantes (Italy) P Lorenzi	6^{5}	2
(Israel) J Erlich (United Kingdom) C Fleming	6	6
(France) P-H Mathieu (France) B Paire	3	0
(Luxembourg) G Müller (Denmark) F Nielsen	2	3
(Uruguay) P Cuevas (Spain) M Granollers	6	6
(Argentina) G Pella (Argentina) H Zeballos	4	4
2	(Netherlands) J-J Rojer (Romania) H Tecău	6	6

Second round
8	(South Africa) R Klaasen (United States) R Ram	6	3	6^{2}
(United States) E Butorac (United States) S Lipsky	3	6	7^{7}
(United States) N Monroe (New Zealand) A Sitak	4	7	4
9	(Poland) Ł Kubot (Austria) A Peya	6	5	6
14	(Canada) D Nestor (Pakistan) A-u-H Qureshi	6	7^{7}
(Israel) J Erlich (United Kingdom) C Fleming	3	6^{4}
(Uruguay) P Cuevas (Spain) M Granollers	5	6	6
2	(Netherlands) J-J Rojer (Romania) H Tecău	7	4	3

Third round
(United States) E Butorac (United States) S Lipsky	7	2	6^{4}
9	(Poland) Ł Kubot (Austria) A Peya	5	6	7^{7}
14	(Canada) D Nestor (Pakistan) A-u-H Qureshi	6^{3}	4
(Uruguay) P Cuevas (Spain) M Granollers	7^{7}	6

Quarterfinals
9	(Poland) Ł Kubot (Austria) A Peya	6	6
(Uruguay) P Cuevas (Spain) M Granollers	1	4
