= 2016 French Open – Mixed doubles =

Mixed doubles
- 2016 French Open

Final
- Champions: (Switzerland) Martina Hingis (India) Leander Paes
- Runners-up: (India) Sania Mirza (Croatia) Ivan Dodig
- Score: 4–6, 6–4, [10–8]

Details
- Draw: 32
- Seeds: 8

Events
Singles	men	women		boys	girls
Doubles	men	women	mixed	boys	girls
WC Singles	men	women	quad
WC Doubles	men	women	quad
Legends	−45	45+	women
- French Open

Martina Hingis and Leander Paes defeated Sania Mirza and Ivan Dodig in the final, 4–6, 6–4, [10–8] to win the mixed doubles tennis title at the 2016 French Open. Hingis and Paes each completed the individual career Grand Slam with the win, as well as the team career Grand Slam. Paes also tied Martina Navratilova's record for the most major mixed doubles titles (10) in the Open Era.

Bethanie Mattek-Sands and Mike Bryan were the reigning champions, but did not participate this year.

== Seeds ==
1. (Chinese Taipei) Chan Hao-ching / (United Kingdom) Jamie Murray (quarterfinals)
2. (India) Sania Mirza / (Croatia) Ivan Dodig (final)
3. (France) Kristina Mladenovic / (France) Pierre-Hugues Herbert (semifinals)
4. (Kazakhstan) Yaroslava Shvedova / (Romania) Florin Mergea (second round)
5. (Russia) Elena Vesnina / (Brazil) Bruno Soares (quarterfinals)
6. (Czech Republic) Andrea Hlaváčková / (France) Édouard Roger-Vasselin (semifinals)
7. (Chinese Taipei) Chan Yung-jan / (Belarus) Max Mirnyi (quarterfinals)
8. (United States) CoCo Vandeweghe / (United States) Bob Bryan (quarterfinals)

== Draw ==
Key

- Q = Qualifier
- WC = Wild card
- LL = Lucky loser
- Alt = Alternate
- ITF = ITF entry
- PR = Protected ranking
- SR = Special ranking
- SE = Special exempt
- JE = Junior exempt
- JR = Junior Accelerator Programme entrant
- CO = College Accelerator Programme entrant
- NG = Next Gen Accelerator Program entrant
- w/o = Walkover
- r = Retired
- d = Defaulted

=== Finals ===
Semifinals
6	(Czech Republic) Andrea Hlaváčková (France) Édouard Roger-Vasselin	3	6	[7]
(Switzerland) Martina Hingis (India) Leander Paes	6	3	[10]
3	(France) Kristina Mladenovic (France) Pierre-Hugues Herbert	6	3	[10]
2	(India) Sania Mirza (Croatia) Ivan Dodig	4	6	[12]

Final
(Switzerland) Martina Hingis (India) Leander Paes	4	6	[10]
2	(India) Sania Mirza (Croatia) Ivan Dodig	6	4	[8]

=== Top half ===
First round
1	(Chinese Taipei) H-c Chan (United Kingdom) J Murray	6	6
(Australia) D Gavrilova (Australia) J Peers	1	2
(Germany) T Maria (France) N Mahut
(Russia) A Kudryavtseva (India) R Bopanna	w/o
(Slovenia) K Srebotnik (Austria) A Peya	4	6	[4]
(Kazakhstan) G Voskoboeva (France) F Martin	6	2	[10]
(Spain) A Medina Garrigues (United States) S Lipsky	2	2
6	(Czech Republic) A Hlaváčková (France) É Roger-Vasselin	6	6
4	(Kazakhstan) Y Shvedova (Romania) F Mergea	6	6
(Czech Republic) L Hradecká (Poland) M Matkowski	4	4
(Switzerland) M Hingis (India) L Paes	6	6
(Germany) A-L Grönefeld (Colombia) R Farah	4	4
(Slovenia) A Klepač (Philippines) T Huey	6	6
(Georgia (country)) O Kalashnikova (Netherlands) J-J Rojer	4	4
(United States) A Spears (Colombia) JS Cabal	4	2
5	(Russia) E Vesnina (Brazil) B Soares	6	6

Second round
1	(Chinese Taipei) H-c Chan (United Kingdom) J Murray	2	6	[10]
(Russia) A Kudryavtseva (India) R Bopanna	6	3	[8]
(Kazakhstan) G Voskoboeva (France) F Martin	2	6^{5}
6	(Czech Republic) A Hlaváčková (France) É Roger-Vasselin	6	7^{7}
4	(Kazakhstan) Y Shvedova (Romania) F Mergea	6	5	[6]
(Switzerland) M Hingis (India) L Paes	2	7	[10]
(Slovenia) A Klepač (Philippines) T Huey	5	6^{3}
5	(Russia) E Vesnina (Brazil) B Soares	7	7^{7}

Quarterfinals
1	(Chinese Taipei) H-c Chan (United Kingdom) J Murray	4	4
6	(Czech Republic) A Hlaváčková (France) É Roger-Vasselin	6	6
(Switzerland) M Hingis (India) L Paes	6	6
5	(Russia) E Vesnina (Brazil) B Soares	4	3

Semifinals
6	(Czech Republic) A Hlaváčková (France) É Roger-Vasselin	3	6	[7]
(Switzerland) M Hingis (India) L Paes	6	3	[10]

=== Bottom half ===
First round
8	(United States) C Vandeweghe (United States) B Bryan	6	7
WC	(France) V Razzano (France) V Millot	3	5
WC	(France) P Parmentier (France) J Benneteau	3	3
Alt	(Chinese Taipei) C-j Chuang (Finland) H Kontinen	6	6
(China) Y Xu (Croatia) M Draganja	6	6
WC	(France) A Lim (France) P-H Mathieu	2	1
(Spain) A Parra Santonja (Croatia) M Pavić	3	4
3	(France) K Mladenovic (France) P-H Herbert	6	6
7	(Chinese Taipei) Y-j Chan (Belarus) M Mirnyi	7	7^{7}
(Romania) S Halep (Romania) H Tecău	5	6^{3}
(Serbia) J Janković (Serbia) N Zimonjić	7^{7}	6
(United States) R Atawo (South Africa) R Klaasen	6^{5}	4
WC	(France) A Cornet (France) J Eysseric	6	6
Alt	(Ukraine) O Savchuk (Pakistan) A-u-H Qureshi	3	3
WC	(France) M Johansson (France) T Lamasine	4	3
2	(India) S Mirza (Croatia) I Dodig	6	6

Second round
8	(United States) C Vandeweghe (United States) B Bryan	6	6
Alt	(Chinese Taipei) C-j Chuang (Finland) H Kontinen	3	3
(China) Y Xu (Croatia) M Draganja	3	4
3	(France) K Mladenovic (France) P-H Herbert	6	6
7	(Chinese Taipei) Y-j Chan (Belarus) M Mirnyi	7	6
(Serbia) J Janković (Serbia) N Zimonjić	5	4
WC	(France) A Cornet (France) J Eysseric	7^{8}	4	[8]
2	(India) S Mirza (Croatia) I Dodig	6^{6}	6	[10]

Quarterfinals
8	(United States) C Vandeweghe (United States) B Bryan	6	2	[11]
3	(France) K Mladenovic (France) P-H Herbert	2	6	[13]
7	(Chinese Taipei) Y-j Chan (Belarus) M Mirnyi	1	6	[6]
2	(India) S Mirza (Croatia) I Dodig	6	3	[10]

Semifinals
3	(France) K Mladenovic (France) P-H Herbert	6	3	[10]
2	(India) S Mirza (Croatia) I Dodig	4	6	[12]
