= 2016 French Open – Legends over 45 doubles =

Legends over 45 doubles
- 2016 French Open

Final
- Champions: (Spain) Sergi Bruguera (Croatia) Goran Ivanišević
- Runners-up: (France) Yannick Noah (France) Cédric Pioline
- Score: 6–3, 7–6^{(7–2)}

Events
Singles	men	women		boys	girls
Doubles	men	women	mixed	boys	girls
WC Singles	men	women	quad
WC Doubles	men	women	quad
Legends	−45	45+	women
← 2015 ·	French Open	· 2017 →

Guy Forget and Henri Leconte were the defending champions; however, Forget decided not to participate in the tournament this year. Leconte teamed up with Arnaud Boetsch, but they were eliminated during the round-robin competition.

Sergi Bruguera and Goran Ivanišević emerged as the champions, defeating Yannick Noah and Cédric Pioline in the final with a score of 6–3, 7–6^{(7–2)}.

== Draw ==
=== Key ===
- Q = Qualifier
- WC = Wild card
- LL = Lucky loser
- Alt = Alternate
- ITF = ITF entry
- PR = Protected ranking
- SR = Special ranking
- SE = Special exempt
- JE = Junior exempt
- JR = Junior Accelerator Programme entrant
- CO = College Accelerator Programme entrant
- NG = Next Gen Accelerator Program entrant
- w/o = Walkover
- r = Retired
- d = Defaulted

=== Final ===
Finals
(Spain) Sergi Bruguera (Croatia) Goran Ivanišević	6	7^{7}
(France) Yannick Noah (France) Cédric Pioline	3	6^{2}

=== Group C ===
		(France) A Boetsch (France) H Leconte	(Australia) P Cash (United States) J McEnroe	(Spain) S Bruguera (Croatia) G Ivanišević	RR; W–L	Set; W–L	Game; W–L	Standings
C1	(France) Arnaud Boetsch (France) Henri Leconte		4–6, 2–6	3–6, 3–6	0–2	0–4	12–24	3
C2	(Australia) Pat Cash (United States) John McEnroe	6–4, 6–2		1–6, 6–3, [5–10]	1–1	3–2	19–16	2
C3	(Spain) Sergi Bruguera (Croatia) Goran Ivanišević	6–3, 6–3	6–1, 3–6, [10–5]		2–0	4–1	22–13	1

Standings are determined by: 1. number of wins; 2. number of matches; 3. in three-players-ties, percentage of sets won, or of games won; 4. steering-committee decision.

=== Group D ===
		(France) Y Noah (France) C Pioline	(Sweden) M Pernfors (Sweden) M Wilander	(France) M Bahrami (Netherlands) R Krajicek	RR; W–L	Set; W–L	Game; W–L	Standings
D1	(France) Yannick Noah (France) Cédric Pioline		6–4, 6–4	7–6^{(7–5)}, 2–6, [10–8]	2–0	4–1	22–20	1
D2	(Sweden) Mikael Pernfors (Sweden) Mats Wilander	4–6, 4–6		6–7^{(2–6)}, 4–6	0–2	0–4	18–25	3
D3	(France) Mansour Bahrami (Netherlands) Richard Krajicek	6–7^{(5–7)}, 6–2, [8–10]	7–6^{(6–2)}, 6–4		1–1	3–2	25–20	2

Standings are determined by: 1. number of wins; 2. number of matches; 3. in three-players-ties, percentage of sets won, or of games won; 4. steering-committee decision.
