= 2016 French Open – Women's legends doubles =

Women's legends doubles
- 2016 French Open

Final
- Champions: (United States) Lindsay Davenport (United States) Martina Navratilova
- Runners-up: (Spain) Conchita Martínez (France) Nathalie Tauziat
- Score: 6–3, 6–2

Events
Singles	men	women		boys	girls
Doubles	men	women	mixed	boys	girls
WC Singles	men	women	quad
WC Doubles	men	women	quad
Legends	−45	45+	women
← 2015 ·	French Open	· 2017 →

Kim Clijsters and Martina Navratilova were the defending champions, but decided not to compete together this year. Clijsters played alongside Tracy Austin-Holt, but they were eliminated at the round-robin stage.

Navratilova successfully defended the title with Lindsay Davenport, defeating Conchita Martínez and Nathalie Tauziat in the final, 6–3, 6–2.

== Draw ==
=== Key ===
- Q = Qualifier
- WC = Wild card
- LL = Lucky loser
- Alt = Alternate
- ITF = ITF entry
- PR = Protected ranking
- SR = Special ranking
- SE = Special exempt
- JE = Junior exempt
- JR = Junior Accelerator Programme entrant
- CO = College Accelerator Programme entrant
- NG = Next Gen Accelerator Program entrant
- w/o = Walkover
- r = Retired
- d = Defaulted

=== Final ===
Finals
(United States) Lindsay Davenport (United States) Martina Navratilova	6	6
(Spain) Conchita Martínez (France) Nathalie Tauziat	3	2

=== Group A ===
		(United States) L Davenport (United States) M Navratilova	(France) M Bartoli (France) S Testud	(Russia) A Myskina (Czech Republic) J Novotná	RR; W–L	Set; W–L	Game; W–L	Standings
A1	(United States) Lindsay Davenport (United States) Martina Navratilova		6–4, 6–4	6–3, 5–7, [10–7]	2–0	4–1	24–18	1
A2	(France) Marion Bartoli (France) Sandrine Testud	4–6, 4–6		6–1, 3–6, [6–10]	0–2	1–4	17–20	3
A3	(Russia) Anastasia Myskina (Czech Republic) Jana Novotná	3–6, 7–5, [7–10]	1–6, 6–3, [10–6]		1–1	4–2	18–21	2

Standings are determined by: 1. number of wins; 2. number of matches; 3. in three-players-ties, percentage of sets won, or of games won; 4. steering-committee decision.

=== Group B ===
		(United States) T Austin-Holt (Belgium) K Clijsters	(Spain) C Martínez (France) N Tauziat	(Croatia) I Majoli (Spain) A Sánchez	RR; W–L	Set; W–L	Game; W–L	Standings
B1	(United States) Tracy Austin-Holt (Belgium) Kim Clijsters		3–6, 7–6^{(7–5)}, [8–10]	6–2, 6–0	1–1	3–2	22–15	2
B2	(Spain) Conchita Martínez (France) Nathalie Tauziat	6–3, 6–7^{(5–7)}, [10–8]		5–7, 7–6^{(9–7)}, [10–3]	2–0	4–2	26–19	1
B3	(Croatia) Iva Majoli (Spain) Arantxa Sánchez	2–6, 0–6	7–5, 6–7^{(7–9)}, [3–10]		0–2	1–4	11–25	3

Standings are determined by: 1. number of wins; 2. number of matches; 3. in three-players-ties, percentage of sets won, or of games won; 4. steering-committee decision.
