= 2016 French Open – Legends under 45 doubles =

Legends under 45 doubles
- 2016 French Open

Final
- Champions: (Spain) Juan Carlos Ferrero (Spain) Carlos Moyá
- Runners-up: (France) Sébastien Grosjean (France) Fabrice Santoro
- Score: 6–4, 6–4

Events
Singles	men	women		boys	girls
Doubles	men	women	mixed	boys	girls
WC Singles	men	women	quad
WC Doubles	men	women	quad
Legends	−45	45+	women
← 2015 ·	French Open	· 2017 →

Juan Carlos Ferrero and Carlos Moyá were the defending champions and successfully defended their title, defeating Sébastien Grosjean and Fabrice Santoro in the final, 6–4, 6–4.

== Draw ==
=== Key ===
- Q = Qualifier
- WC = Wild card
- LL = Lucky loser
- Alt = Alternate
- ITF = ITF entry
- PR = Protected ranking
- SR = Special ranking
- SE = Special exempt
- JE = Junior exempt
- JR = Junior Accelerator Programme entrant
- CO = College Accelerator Programme entrant
- NG = Next Gen Accelerator Program entrant
- w/o = Walkover
- r = Retired
- d = Defaulted

=== Final ===
Finals
(France) Sébastien Grosjean (France) Fabrice Santoro	4	4
(Spain) Juan Carlos Ferrero (Spain) Carlos Moyá	6	6

=== Group A ===
		(France) S Grosjean (France) F Santoro	(Russia) Y Kafelnikov (Ukraine) A Medvedev	(Sweden) T Enqvist (Sweden) M Norman	RR; W–L	Set; W–L	Game; W–L	Standings
A1	(France) Sébastien Grosjean (France) Fabrice Santoro		6–2, 4–6, [11–9]	6–4, 6–4	2–0	4–1	23–16	1
A2	(Russia) Yevgeny Kafelnikov (Ukraine) Andrei Medvedev	2–6, 6–4, [9–11]		6–4, 3–6, [11–13]	0–2	2–4	18–22	3
A3	(Sweden) Thomas Enqvist (Sweden) Magnus Norman	4–6, 4–6	4–6, 6–3, [13–11]		1–1	2–3	19–22	2

Standings are determined by: 1. number of wins; 2. number of matches; 3. in three-players-ties, percentage of sets won, or of games won; 4. steering-committee decision.

=== Group B ===
		(France) A Clément (France) N Escudé	(Spain) JC Ferrero (Spain) C Moyá	(United States) M Chang (Spain) À Corretja	RR; W–L	Set; W–L	Game; W–L	Standings
B1	(France) Arnaud Clément (France) Nicolas Escudé		2–6, 6–7^{(5–7)}	1–6, 4–6	0–2	0–4	13–25	3
B2	(Spain) Juan Carlos Ferrero (Spain) Carlos Moyá	6–2, 7–6^{(7–5)}		6–3, 6–3	2–0	4–0	25–14	1
B3	(United States) Michael Chang (Spain) Àlex Corretja	6–1, 6–4	3–6, 3–6		1–1	2–2	18–17	2

Standings are determined by: 1. number of wins; 2. number of matches; 3. in three-players-ties, percentage of sets won, or of games won; 4. steering-committee decision.
