= 2016 French Open – Men's singles =

Men's singles
- 2016 French Open

Final
- Champion: (Serbia) Novak Djokovic
- Runner-up: (United Kingdom) Andy Murray
- Score: 3–6, 6–1, 6–2, 6–4

Details
- Draw: 128 (16 Q / 7 WC )
- Seeds: 32

Events
Singles	men	women		boys	girls
Doubles	men	women	mixed	boys	girls
WC Singles	men	women	quad
WC Doubles	men	women	quad
Legends	−45	45+	women
- French Open

Novak Djokovic defeated Andy Murray in the final, 3–6, 6–1, 6–2, 6–4 to win the men's singles tennis title at the 2016 French Open. It was his first French Open title and twelfth major title overall, completing the career Grand Slam and achieving a non-calendar year Grand Slam. Djokovic was the first man since Rod Laver in 1969 to hold all four major titles simultaneously, and the first to do so on three different surfaces. Additionally, he spent his 200th week at world No. 1 in the ATP rankings and his 100th consecutive week at world No. 1 during the tournament. Djokovic extended his record for the most ranking points ever held by a player to 16,950.

Stan Wawrinka was the defending champion, but lost in the semifinals to Murray. Murray became the first British man to reach the final since Bunny Austin in 1937. Murray's run meant he had reached the final of all four majors at least once in his career.

This tournament marked the first time in the 21st century that Roger Federer did not play at a main draw singles major, withdrawing prior to the tournament to avoid "unnecessary [fitness] risk" since he was "still not 100%". Thus, he ended a then-record of 65 consecutive major appearances, dating back to the 2000 Australian Open.

Nine-time champion Rafael Nadal withdrew prior to his third-round match due to a wrist injury.

This tournament marked the first main-draw French Open appearance of future champion and world No. 1 Alexander Zverev; he lost to Dominic Thiem in the third round.

== Seeds ==
1. (Serbia) Novak Djokovic (champion)
2. (United Kingdom) Andy Murray (final)
3. (Switzerland) Stan Wawrinka (semifinals)
4. (Spain) Rafael Nadal (third round, withdrew)
5. (Japan) Kei Nishikori (fourth round)
6. (France) Jo-Wilfried Tsonga (third round, retired)
7. (Czech Republic) Tomáš Berdych (quarterfinals)
8. (Canada) Milos Raonic (fourth round)
9. (France) Richard Gasquet (quarterfinals)
10. (Croatia) Marin Čilić (first round)
11. (Spain) David Ferrer (fourth round)
12. (Belgium) David Goffin (quarterfinals)
13. (Austria) Dominic Thiem (semifinals)
14. (Spain) Roberto Bautista Agut (fourth round)
15. (United States) John Isner (fourth round)
16. (France) Gilles Simon (third round)
17. (Australia) Nick Kyrgios (third round)
18. (South Africa) Kevin Anderson (first round)
19. (France) Benoît Paire (second round)
20. (Australia) Bernard Tomic (second round)
21. (Spain) Feliciano López (third round)
22. (Serbia) Viktor Troicki (fourth round)
23. (United States) Jack Sock (third round)
24. (Germany) Philipp Kohlschreiber (first round)
25. (Uruguay) Pablo Cuevas (third round)
26. (Portugal) João Sousa (second round)
27. (Croatia) Ivo Karlović (third round)
28. (Ukraine) Alexandr Dolgopolov (withdrew)
29. (France) Lucas Pouille (second round)
30. (France) Jérémy Chardy (third round)
31. (Argentina) Federico Delbonis (first round)
32. (Italy) Fabio Fognini (first round)
33. (United States) Steve Johnson (first round)

Click on the seed number of a player to go to their draw section.

== Draw ==
Key

- Q = Qualifier
- WC = Wild card
- LL = Lucky loser
- Alt = Alternate
- ITF = ITF entry
- PR = Protected ranking
- SR = Special ranking
- SE = Special exempt
- JE = Junior exempt
- JR = Junior Accelerator Programme entrant
- CO = College Accelerator Programme entrant
- NG = Next Gen Accelerator Program entrant
- w/o = Walkover
- r = Retired
- d = Defaulted

=== Finals ===
Quarterfinals
1	(Serbia) Novak Djokovic	6	7	6
7	(Czech Republic) Tomáš Berdych	3	5	3
13	(Austria) Dominic Thiem	4	7^{9}	6	6
12	(Belgium) David Goffin	6	6^{7}	4	1
(Spain) Albert Ramos-Viñolas	2	1	6^{7}
3	(Switzerland) Stan Wawrinka	6	6	7^{9}
9	(France) Richard Gasquet	7	6^{3}	0	2
2	(United Kingdom) Andy Murray	5	7^{7}	6	6

Semifinals
1	(Serbia) Novak Djokovic	6	6	6
13	(Austria) Dominic Thiem	2	1	4
3	(Switzerland) Stan Wawrinka	4	2	6	2
2	(United Kingdom) Andy Murray	6	6	4	6

Final
1	(Serbia) Novak Djokovic	3	6	6	6
2	(United Kingdom) Andy Murray	6	1	2	4

=== Top half ===
==== Section 1 ====
First round
1	(Serbia) N Djokovic	6	6	6
(Chinese Taipei) Y-h Lu	4	1	1
Q	(Turkey) M İlhan	3	4	0
Q	(Belgium) S Darcis	6	6	6
Q	(Austria) G Melzer	6	3	4	4
(United Kingdom) A Bedene	4	6	6	6
(Spain) P Carreño Busta	7^{7}	6^{4}	6	6
31	(Argentina) F Delbonis	6^{3}	7^{7}	4	4
20	(Australia) B Tomic	6	6	6
PR	(United States) B Baker	3	4	4
(Croatia) B Ćorić	6	6	6
(United States) T Fritz	3	1	3
(France) P-H Mathieu	6	6^{2}	6	1	6
(Colombia) S Giraldo	4	7^{7}	4	6	3
PR	(Russia) D Tursunov	3	3	1
14	(Spain) R Bautista Agut	6	6	6

Second round
1	(Serbia) N Djokovic	7	6	6
Q	(Belgium) S Darcis	5	3	4
(United Kingdom) A Bedene	7^{7}	6	4	5	6
(Spain) P Carreño Busta	6^{4}	3	6	7	2
20	(Australia) B Tomic	6	2	6^{4}	6^{6}
(Croatia) B Ćorić	3	6	7^{7}	7^{8}
(France) P-H Mathieu	6^{5}	4	1
14	(Spain) R Bautista Agut	7^{7}	6	6

Third round
1	(Serbia) N Djokovic	6	6	6
(United Kingdom) A Bedene	2	3	3
(Croatia) B Ćorić	2	3	3
14	(Spain) R Bautista Agut	6	6	6

Fourth round
1	(Serbia) N Djokovic	3	6	6	7
14	(Spain) R Bautista Agut	6	4	1	5

==== Section 2 ====
First round
11	(Spain) D Ferrer	6	6	6
(Russia) E Donskoy	1	2	0
(Uzbekistan) D Istomin	6	4	3	5
(Argentina) J Mónaco	3	6	6	7
(Dominican Republic) V Estrella Burgos	7	6	6
(Ukraine) I Marchenko	5	4	3
LL	(Italy) T Fabbiano	4	4	6	2
21	(Spain) F López	6	6	3	6
25	(Uruguay) P Cuevas	3	6	6	7^{7}
Q	(Germany) T Kamke	6	2	3	6^{4}
(South Korea) H Chung	1	4	4
WC	(France) Q Halys	6	6	6
(Tunisia) M Jaziri	6	3	6	6
PR	(Germany) F Mayer	4	6	1	2
(Canada) V Pospisil	3	2	1
7	(Czech Republic) T Berdych	6	6	6

Second round
11	(Spain) D Ferrer	6^{4}	6	6	6
(Argentina) J Mónaco	7^{7}	3	4	2
(Dominican Republic) V Estrella Burgos	3	6^{8}	3
21	(Spain) F López	6	7^{10}	6
25	(Uruguay) P Cuevas	7^{7}	6	7^{8}
WC	(France) Q Halys	6^{4}	3	6^{6}
(Tunisia) M Jaziri	1	6	2	4
7	(Czech Republic) T Berdych	6	2	6	6

Third round
11	(Spain) D Ferrer	6	7^{8}	6
21	(Spain) F López	4	6^{6}	1
25	(Uruguay) P Cuevas	6	3	2	5
7	(Czech Republic) T Berdych	4	6	6	7

Fourth round
11	(Spain) D Ferrer	3	5	3
7	(Czech Republic) T Berdych	6	7	6

==== Section 3 ====
First round
4	(Spain) R Nadal	6	6	6
(Australia) S Groth	1	1	1
(Argentina) F Bagnis	6	6	7^{7}
Q	(France) K de Schepper	0	2	6^{2}
(France) N Mahut	7^{7}	6	6
(Lithuania) R Berankis	6^{4}	2	1
(Spain) M Granollers	7	6	6
32	(Italy) F Fognini	5	4	3
18	(South Africa) K Anderson	4	2	6	5
WC	(France) S Robert	6	6	1	7
(Germany) A Zverev	5	6	7^{8}	7
(France) P-H Herbert	7	2	6^{6}	5
(Netherlands) T de Bakker	4	4	7	6^{3}
(Spain) G García-López	6	6	5	7^{7}
(Spain) Í Cervantes	6	2	5	1
13	(Austria) D Thiem	3	6	7	6

Second round
4	(Spain) R Nadal	6	6	6
(Argentina) F Bagnis	3	0	3
(France) N Mahut	3	2	0^{r}
(Spain) M Granollers	6	6	1
WC	(France) S Robert	1	6	1	4
(Germany) A Zverev	6	3	6	6
(Spain) G García-López	5	4	6^{3}
13	(Austria) D Thiem	7	6	7^{7}

Third round
4	(Spain) R Nadal
(Spain) M Granollers	w/o
(Germany) A Zverev	7^{7}	3	3	3
13	(Austria) D Thiem	6^{4}	6	6	6

Fourth round
(Spain) M Granollers	2	7^{7}	1	4
13	(Austria) D Thiem	6	6^{2}	6	6

==== Section 4 ====
First round
12	(Belgium) D Goffin	6	6	6
WC	(France) G Barrère	3	3	4
(Italy) P Lorenzi	3	0	2
Q	(Argentina) C Berlocq	6	6	6
(United States) R Ram	4	4	7^{7}	0
(Czech Republic) J Veselý	6	6	6^{5}	6
(Spain) N Almagro	5	6	6	6
24	(Germany) P Kohlschreiber	7	2	2	4
26	(Portugal) J Sousa	2	7^{10}	6	7
(Bosnia and Herzegovina) D Džumhur	6	6^{8}	4	5
(Italy) A Seppi	3	5	4
(Latvia) E Gulbis	6	7	6
(Luxembourg) G Müller	5	4	1
(Cyprus) M Baghdatis	7	6	6
Q	(Germany) J-L Struff	3	4	4
6	(France) J-W Tsonga	6	6	6

Second round
12	(Belgium) D Goffin	7	6	6
Q	(Argentina) C Berlocq	5	1	4
(Czech Republic) J Veselý	4	4	3
(Spain) N Almagro	6	6	6
26	(Portugal) J Sousa	2	5	3
(Latvia) E Gulbis	6	7	6
(Cyprus) M Baghdatis	7^{8}	6	3	2	2
6	(France) J-W Tsonga	6^{6}	3	6	6	6

Third round
12	(Belgium) D Goffin	6	4	6	4	6
(Spain) N Almagro	2	6	3	6	2
(Latvia) E Gulbis	2
6	(France) J-W Tsonga	5^{r}

Fourth round
12	(Belgium) D Goffin	4	6	6	6
(Latvia) E Gulbis	6	2	2	3

=== Bottom half ===
==== Section 5 ====
First round
8	(Canada) M Raonic	6	6	7^{7}
PR	(Serbia) J Tipsarević	3	2	6^{5}
(Kazakhstan) M Kukushkin	4	6	2	4
(France) A Mannarino	6	2	6	6
LL	(Slovakia) A Martin	6	6	4	6
(Spain) D Muñoz de la Nava	2	3	6	4
WC	(France) J Benneteau	3	6	4	6^{4}
29	(France) L Pouille	6	4	6	7^{7}
23	(United States) J Sock	6	7	3	6^{3}	6
(Netherlands) R Haase	3	5	6	7^{7}	2
(Israel) D Sela	7^{7}	4	6^{5}	6	4
Q	(Germany) D Brown	6^{5}	6	7^{7}	4	6
(Spain) A Ramos-Viñolas	6	4	7	6
(Argentina) H Zeballos	3	6	5	0
Q	(Argentina) M Trungelliti	7^{7}	3	6	6
10	(Croatia) M Čilić	6^{4}	6	4	2

Second round
8	(Canada) M Raonic	6	7^{7}	6
(France) A Mannarino	1	6^{0}	1
LL	(Slovakia) A Martin	6	7	6
29	(France) L Pouille	3	5	3
23	(United States) J Sock	6	7^{7}	6
Q	(Germany) D Brown	3	6^{5}	2
(Spain) A Ramos-Viñolas	6	6	7
Q	(Argentina) M Trungelliti	3	4	5

Third round
8	(Canada) M Raonic	7^{7}	6	6
LL	(Slovakia) A Martin	6^{4}	2	3
23	(United States) J Sock	7^{7}	4	4	6	4
(Spain) A Ramos-Viñolas	6^{2}	6	6	4	6

Fourth round
8	(Canada) M Raonic	2	4	4
(Spain) A Ramos-Viñolas	6	6	6

==== Section 6 ====
First round
16	(France) G Simon	7^{7}	6	6
(Brazil) R Dutra Silva	6^{5}	4	2
(Argentina) D Schwartzman	2	6	2	3
(Argentina) G Pella	6	3	6	6
(Serbia) D Lajović	6	6	6
(United States) D Kudla	4	3	3
(Bulgaria) G Dimitrov	6	3	7	5	3
22	(Serbia) V Troicki	2	6	5	7	6
30	(France) J Chardy	6	3	6	6
(Argentina) L Mayer	4	6	4	2
Q	(Spain) R Carballés Baena	2	6	3	6	1
LL	(Czech Republic) A Pavlásek	6	4	6	1	6
(Slovakia) M Kližan	6	6	5	4	0^{r}
(Japan) T Daniel	3	4	7	6	3
(Czech Republic) L Rosol	6	1	6	3	4
3	(Switzerland) S Wawrinka	4	6	3	6	6

Second round
16	(France) G Simon	4	1	7	7^{7}	6
(Argentina) G Pella	6	6	5	6^{4}	4
(Serbia) D Lajović	7^{7}	3	0	0^{r}
22	(Serbia) V Troicki	6^{4}	6	6	0
30	(France) J Chardy	6	6	6
LL	(Czech Republic) A Pavlásek	4	2	4
(Japan) T Daniel	6^{7}	3	4
3	(Switzerland) S Wawrinka	7^{9}	6	6

Third round
16	(France) G Simon	4	2	2
22	(Serbia) V Troicki	6	6	6
30	(France) J Chardy	4	3	5
3	(Switzerland) S Wawrinka	6	6	7

Fourth round
22	(Serbia) V Troicki	6^{5}	7^{9}	3	2
3	(Switzerland) S Wawrinka	7^{7}	6^{7}	6	6

==== Section 7 ====
First round
5	(Japan) K Nishikori	6	7	6
(Italy) S Bolelli	1	5	3
(Russia) A Kuznetsov	6	6	6
(Germany) B Becker	2	2	4
(Croatia) I Dodig	6	5	7	2	6
(Russia) M Youzhny	4	7	5	6	3
(Spain) F Verdasco	7	6	7
33	(United States) S Johnson	5	4	5
17	(Australia) N Kyrgios	7^{8}	7^{8}	6
(Italy) M Cecchinato	6^{6}	6^{6}	4
Q	(Romania) A Ungur	1	2	6^{5}
LL	(Netherlands) I Sijsling	6	6	7^{7}
(United States) S Querrey	3	1	7^{7}	3
WC	(United States) B Fratangelo	6	6	6^{3}	6
(Brazil) T Bellucci	1	3	4
9	(France) R Gasquet	6	6	6

Second round
5	(Japan) K Nishikori	6	6	6
(Russia) A Kuznetsov	3	3	3
(Croatia) I Dodig	2	1	3
(Spain) F Verdasco	6	6	6
17	(Australia) N Kyrgios	6	6	6
LL	(Netherlands) I Sijsling	3	2	1
WC	(United States) B Fratangelo	1	6^{3}	3
9	(France) R Gasquet	6	7^{7}	6

Third round
5	(Japan) K Nishikori	6	6	3	2	6
(Spain) F Verdasco	3	4	6	6	4
17	(Australia) N Kyrgios	2	6^{7}	2
9	(France) R Gasquet	6	7^{9}	6

Fourth round
5	(Japan) K Nishikori	4	2	6	2
9	(France) R Gasquet	6	6	4	6

==== Section 8 ====
First round
15	(United States) J Isner	6^{4}	7^{14}	7^{9}	7
(Australia) J Millman	7^{7}	6^{12}	6^{7}	5
Q	(Georgia (country)) N Basilashvili	6^{4}	7^{9}	5	1
(United Kingdom) K Edmund	7^{7}	6^{7}	7	6
(Russia) T Gabashvili	7^{7}	6	6
(United States) D Young	6^{1}	2	3
Q	(Moldova) R Albot	2	6	4	6	4
19	(France) B Paire	6	4	6	1	6
27	(Croatia) I Karlović	6	7^{9}	7^{7}
(Spain) A Montañés	2	6^{7}	6^{5}
Q	(Serbia) L Đere	3	4	5
WC	(Australia) J Thompson	6	6	7
WC	(France) M Bourgue	7	7^{7}	7^{8}
Q	(Spain) J Samper-Montaña	5	6^{5}	6^{6}
Q	(Czech Republic) R Štěpánek	6	6	0	3	5
2	(United Kingdom) A Murray	3	3	6	6	7

Second round
15	(United States) J Isner	6	6	6
(United Kingdom) K Edmund	4	4	4
(Russia) T Gabashvili	6	6	3	6
19	(France) B Paire	3	2	6	2
27	(Croatia) I Karlović	6^{2}	6	7^{7}	6^{4}	12
WC	(Australia) J Thompson	7^{7}	3	6^{3}	7^{7}	10
WC	(France) M Bourgue	2	6	6	2	3
2	(United Kingdom) A Murray	6	2	4	6	6

Third round
15	(United States) J Isner	7^{9}	4	2	6	6
(Russia) T Gabashvili	6^{7}	6	6	4	2
27	(Croatia) I Karlović	1	4	6^{3}
2	(United Kingdom) A Murray	6	6	7^{7}

Fourth round
15	(United States) J Isner	6^{9}	4	3
2	(United Kingdom) A Murray	7^{11}	6	6

Preceded by 2016 Australian Open – Men's singles	Grand Slam men's singles	Succeeded by 2016 Wimbledon Championships – Men's singles
