= 2016 French Open =

- Date: 22 May – 5 June 2016
- Edition: 115
- Category: Grand Slam
- Draw: 128S/64D/32X
- Prize money: €32,017,500
- Surface: Clay
- Location: Paris (XVI^{e}), France
- Venue: Roland Garros Stadium

Champions

Men's singles
- (Serbia) Novak Djokovic

Women's singles
- (Spain) Garbiñe Muguruza

Men's doubles
- (Spain) Feliciano López / (Spain) Marc López

Women's doubles
- (France) Caroline Garcia / (France) Kristina Mladenovic

Mixed doubles
- (Switzerland) Martina Hingis / (India) Leander Paes

Wheelchair men's singles
- (Argentina) Gustavo Fernández

Wheelchair women's singles
- (Netherlands) Marjolein Buis

Wheelchair men's doubles
- (Japan) Shingo Kunieda / (United Kingdom) Gordon Reid

Wheelchair women's doubles
- (Japan) Yui Kamiji / (United Kingdom) Jordanne Whiley

Boys' singles
- (France) Geoffrey Blancaneaux

Girls' singles
- (Switzerland) Rebeka Masarova

Boys' doubles
- (Israel) Yshai Oliel / (Czech Republic) Patrik Rikl

Girls' doubles
- (Spain) Paula Arias Manjón / (Serbia) Olga Danilović

Legends under 45 doubles
- (Spain) Juan Carlos Ferrero / (Spain) Carlos Moyá

Women's legends doubles
- (United States) Lindsay Davenport / (United States) Martina Navratilova

Legends over 45 doubles
- (Spain) Sergi Bruguera / (Croatia) Goran Ivanišević
- French Open

The 2016 French Open was a tennis tournament played on outdoor clay courts. It was the 115th edition of the French Open and the second Grand Slam event of the year. It took place at the Stade Roland Garros from 22 May to 5 June and consisted of events for professional players in singles, doubles and mixed doubles play. Junior and wheelchair players also took part in singles and doubles events.

Novak Djokovic won the men's singles in the 2016 edition. Stan Wawrinka was the defending champion in men's singles, but he lost to Andy Murray in the semifinals. Serena Williams was the defending champion in the women's singles, but she lost to Garbiñe Muguruza in the final. Roger Federer withdrew before the tournament to avoid "unnecessary [fitness] risk", making this tournament the first Grand Slam he missed since the 1999 US Open. Furthermore, nine-time champion Rafael Nadal withdrew during the tournament due to injury, for the first time in his French Open career.

Novak Djokovic's victory at this tournament in his 20th Grand Slam final completed his career Grand Slam of all four major tournaments, the eighth man to do so in singles and the fifth since the start of the Open Era (after Rod Laver, Andre Agassi, Roger Federer, and Rafael Nadal). Djokovic also achieved a non-calendar year Grand Slam, becoming the first man since Rod Laver in 1969 to hold all four major titles at once. The victory by Garbiñe Muguruza was her first Grand Slam win in her second Grand Slam final.

== Tournament ==
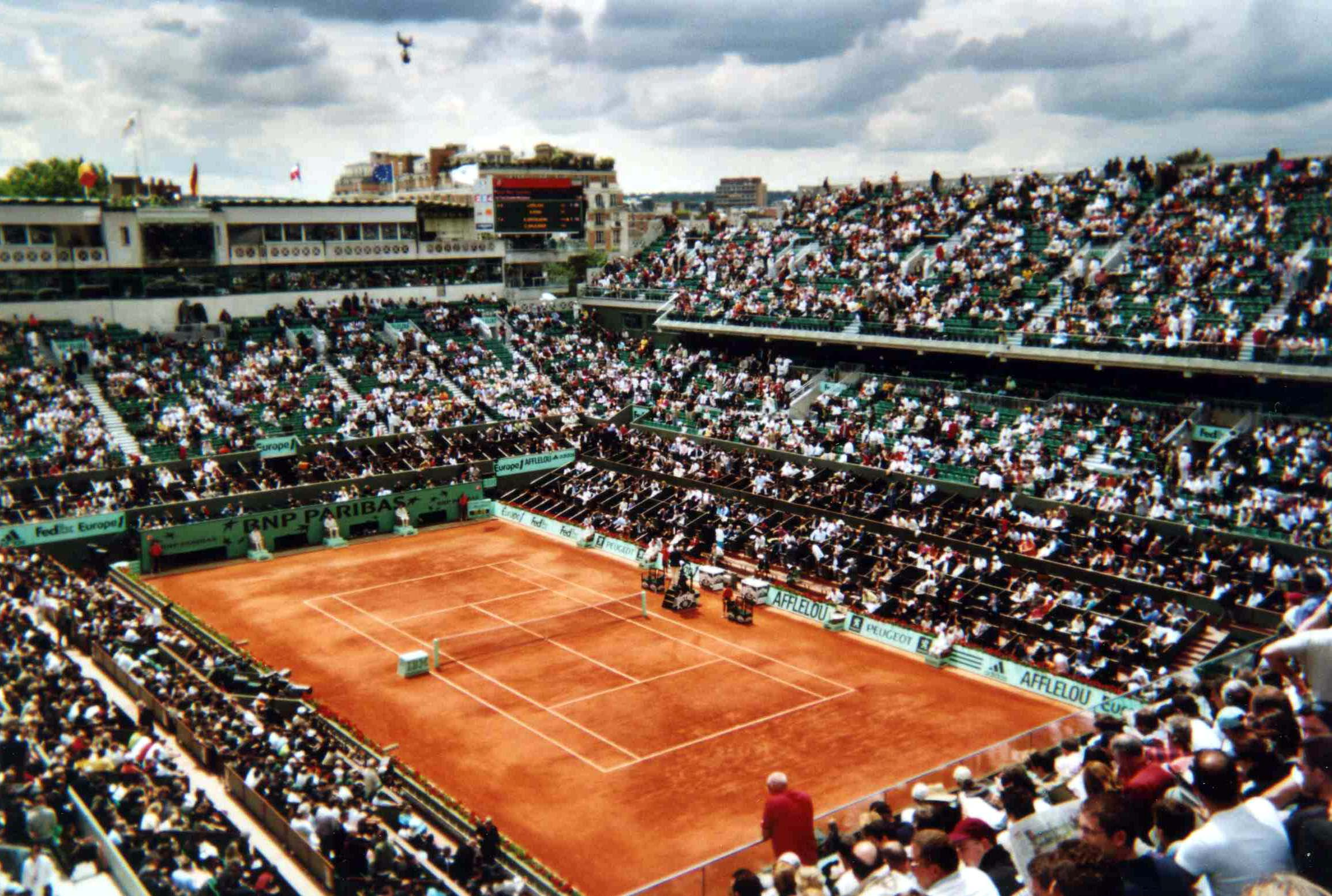
Court Philippe Chatrier, where the Finals of the French Open take place.

The 2016 French Open was the 115th edition of the French Open and was held at Stade Roland Garros in Paris.

The tournament was run by the International Tennis Federation (ITF) and was part of the 2016 ATP World Tour and the 2016 WTA Tour calendars under the Grand Slam category. The tournament consisted of men's and women's singles and doubles draws as well as a mixed doubles event.

There were singles and doubles events for both boys and girls (players under 18), and singles and doubles events for men's and women's wheelchair tennis players as part of the UNIQLO tour under the Grand Slam category. The tournament was played on clay courts and took place over a series of 22 courts, including the three main showcourts, Court Philippe Chatrier, Court Suzanne Lenglen and Court 1.

== Points and prize money ==
=== Points distribution ===
The ranking points awarded for each event are shown below.

==== Senior points ====
Event	W	F	SF	QF	Round of 16	Round of 32	Round of 64	Round of 128	Q	Q3	Q2	Q1
Men's singles	2000	1200	720	360	180	90	45	10	25	16	8	0
Men's doubles	2000	1200	720	360	180	90	0	—N/a	—N/a	—N/a	—N/a	—N/a
Women's singles	2000	1300	780	430	240	130	70	10	40	30	20	2
Women's doubles	2000	1300	780	430	240	130	10	—N/a	—N/a	—N/a	—N/a	—N/a

==== Wheelchair points ====
Event	W	F	SF/3rd	QF/4th
Singles	800	500	375	100
Doubles	800	500	100	—N/a
Quad singles	800	500	100	—N/a
Quad doubles	800	100	—N/a	—N/a

==== Junior points ====
Event	W	F	SF	QF	Round of 16	Round of 32	Q	Q3
Boys' singles	375	270	180	120	75	30	25	20
Girls' singles	375	270	180	120	75	30	25	20
Boys' doubles	270	180	120	75	45	—N/a	—N/a	—N/a
Girls' doubles	270	180	120	75	45	—N/a	—N/a	—N/a

=== Prize money ===
The total prize money for the tournament was €32,017,500, an increase of 14% compared to the previous edition. The winners of both the men's and women's singles title received €2,000,000, an increase of €200,000 compared to 2015.

Event	W	F	SF	QF	Round of 16	Round of 32	Round of 64	Round of 128	Q3	Q2	Q1
Singles	€2,000,000	€1,000,000	€500,000	€294,000	€173,000	€102,000	€60,000	€30,000	€14,000	€7,000	€3,500
Doubles *	€500,000	€250,000	€125,000	€68,000	€37,000	€19,000	€9,500	—N/a	—N/a	—N/a	—N/a
Mixed doubles *	€116,000	€58,000	€28,500	€16,000	€8,500	€4,250	—N/a	—N/a	—N/a	—N/a	—N/a
Wheelchair singles	€35,000	€17,500	€8,500	€4,500	—N/a	—N/a	—N/a	—N/a	—N/a	—N/a	—N/a
Wheelchair doubles *	€10,000	€5,000	€3,000	—N/a	—N/a	—N/a	—N/a	—N/a	—N/a	—N/a	—N/a

_{* per team}

== Singles players ==
2016 French Open – Men's singles

Champion		Runner-up	
(Serbia) Novak Djokovic [1]		(United Kingdom) Andy Murray [2]	
Semifinals out
(Austria) Dominic Thiem [13]		(Switzerland) Stan Wawrinka [3]	
Quarterfinals out
(Czech Republic) Tomáš Berdych [7]	(Belgium) David Goffin [12]	(Spain) Albert Ramos Viñolas	(France) Richard Gasquet [9]
4th round out
(Spain) Roberto Bautista Agut [14]	(Spain) David Ferrer [11]	(Spain) Marcel Granollers	(Latvia) Ernests Gulbis
(Canada) Milos Raonic [8]	(Serbia) Viktor Troicki [22]	(Japan) Kei Nishikori [5]	(United States) John Isner [15]
3rd round out
(United Kingdom) Aljaž Bedene	(Croatia) Borna Ćorić	(Spain) Feliciano López [21]	(Uruguay) Pablo Cuevas [25]
(Spain) Rafael Nadal [4]	(Germany) Alexander Zverev	(Spain) Nicolás Almagro	(France) Jo-Wilfried Tsonga [6]
(Slovakia) Andrej Martin (LL)	(United States) Jack Sock [23]	(France) Gilles Simon [16]	(France) Jérémy Chardy [30]
(Spain) Fernando Verdasco	(Australia) Nick Kyrgios [17]	(Russia) Teymuraz Gabashvili	(Croatia) Ivo Karlović [27]
2nd round out
(Belgium) Steve Darcis (Q)	(Spain) Pablo Carreño	(Australia) Bernard Tomic [20]	(France) Paul-Henri Mathieu
(Argentina) Juan Mónaco	(Dominican Republic) Víctor Estrella Burgos	(France) Quentin Halys (WC)	(Tunisia) Malek Jaziri
(Argentina) Facundo Bagnis	(France) Nicolas Mahut	(France) Stéphane Robert (WC)	(Spain) Guillermo García López
(Argentina) Carlos Berlocq (Q)	(Czech Republic) Jiří Veselý	(Portugal) João Sousa [26]	(Cyprus) Marcos Baghdatis
(France) Adrian Mannarino	(France) Lucas Pouille [29]	(Germany) Dustin Brown (Q)	(Argentina) Marco Trungelliti (Q)
(Argentina) Guido Pella	(Serbia) Dušan Lajović	(Czech Republic) Adam Pavlásek (LL)	(Japan) Taro Daniel
(Russia) Andrey Kuznetsov	(Croatia) Ivan Dodig	(Netherlands) Igor Sijsling (LL)	(United States) Bjorn Fratangelo (WC)
(United Kingdom) Kyle Edmund	(France) Benoît Paire [19]	(Australia) Jordan Thompson (WC)	(France) Mathias Bourgue (WC)
1st round out
(Chinese Taipei) Lu Yen-hsun	(Turkey) Marsel İlhan (Q)	(Austria) Gerald Melzer (Q)	(Argentina) Federico Delbonis [31]
(United States) Brian Baker (PR)	(United States) Taylor Fritz	(Colombia) Santiago Giraldo	(Russia) Dmitry Tursunov (PR)
(Russia) Evgeny Donskoy	(Uzbekistan) Denis Istomin	(Ukraine) Illya Marchenko	(Italy) Thomas Fabbiano (LL)
(Germany) Tobias Kamke (Q)	(South Korea) Chung Hyeon	(Germany) Florian Mayer (PR)	(Canada) Vasek Pospisil
(Australia) Sam Groth	(France) Kenny de Schepper (Q)	(Lithuania) Ričardas Berankis	(Italy) Fabio Fognini [32]
(South Africa) Kevin Anderson [18]	(France) Pierre-Hugues Herbert	(Netherlands) Thiemo de Bakker	(Spain) Íñigo Cervantes
(France) Grégoire Barrère (WC)	(Italy) Paolo Lorenzi	(United States) Rajeev Ram (Q)	(Germany) Philipp Kohlschreiber [24]
(Bosnia and Herzegovina) Damir Džumhur	(Italy) Andreas Seppi	(Luxembourg) Gilles Müller	(Germany) Jan-Lennard Struff (Q)
(Serbia) Janko Tipsarević (PR)	(Kazakhstan) Mikhail Kukushkin	(Spain) Daniel Muñoz de la Nava	(France) Julien Benneteau (WC)
(Netherlands) Robin Haase	(Israel) Dudi Sela	(Argentina) Horacio Zeballos	(Croatia) Marin Čilić [10]
(Brazil) Rogério Dutra Silva	(Argentina) Diego Schwartzman	(United States) Denis Kudla	(Bulgaria) Grigor Dimitrov
(Argentina) Leonardo Mayer	(Spain) Roberto Carballés Baena (Q)	(Slovakia) Martin Kližan	(Czech Republic) Lukáš Rosol
(Italy) Simone Bolelli	(Germany) Benjamin Becker	(Russia) Mikhail Youzhny	(United States) Steve Johnson [33]
(Italy) Marco Cecchinato	(Romania) Adrian Ungur (Q)	(United States) Sam Querrey	(Brazil) Thomaz Bellucci
(Australia) John Millman	(Georgia (country)) Nikoloz Basilashvili (Q)	(United States) Donald Young	(Moldova) Radu Albot (Q)
(Spain) Albert Montañés	(Serbia) Laslo Djere (Q)	(Spain) Jordi Samper Montaña (Q)	(Czech Republic) Radek Štěpánek (Q)

2016 French Open – Women's singles

Champion		Runner-up	
(Spain) Garbiñe Muguruza [4]		(United States) Serena Williams [1]	
Semifinals out
(Netherlands) Kiki Bertens		(Australia) Samantha Stosur [21]	
Quarterfinals out
(Kazakhstan) Yulia Putintseva	(Switzerland) Timea Bacsinszky [8]	(United States) Shelby Rogers	(Bulgaria) Tsvetana Pironkova
4th round out
(Ukraine) Elina Svitolina [18]	(Spain) Carla Suárez Navarro [12]	(United States) Madison Keys [15]	(United States) Venus Williams [9]
(Romania) Irina-Camelia Begu [25]	(Russia) Svetlana Kuznetsova [13]	(Romania) Simona Halep [6]	(Poland) Agnieszka Radwańska [2]
3rd round out
(France) Kristina Mladenovic [26]	(Serbia) Ana Ivanovic [14]	(Slovakia) Dominika Cibulková [22]	(Italy) Karin Knapp
(Russia) Daria Kasatkina [29]	(Puerto Rico) Monica Puig	(France) Alizé Cornet	(France) Pauline Parmentier
(Germany) Annika Beck	(Czech Republic) Petra Kvitová [10]	(Russia) Anastasia Pavlyuchenkova [24]	(Belgium) Yanina Wickmayer
(Japan) Naomi Osaka	(Czech Republic) Lucie Šafářová [11]	(United States) Sloane Stephens [19]	(Czech Republic) Barbora Strýcová [30]
2nd round out
(Brazil) Teliana Pereira	(Hungary) Tímea Babos	(United States) Taylor Townsend (WC)	(Japan) Kurumi Nara
(China) Wang Qiang	(Croatia) Ana Konjuh	(Germany) Andrea Petkovic [28]	(Latvia) Anastasija Sevastova
(Italy) Camila Giorgi	(France) Virginie Razzano (WC)	(Germany) Julia Görges	(Colombia) Mariana Duque Mariño
(United States) Louisa Chirico (Q)	(Germany) Tatjana Maria	(United States) Irina Falconi	(Canada) Eugenie Bouchard
(Ukraine) Kateryna Bondarenko	(United States) CoCo Vandeweghe	(Russia) Elena Vesnina	(Chinese Taipei) Hsieh Su-wei
(United Kingdom) Heather Watson	(Turkey) Çağla Büyükakçay (Q)	(Russia) Ekaterina Makarova [27]	(France) Myrtille Georges (WC)
(Kazakhstan) Zarina Diyas	(Croatia) Mirjana Lučić-Baroni	(China) Zhang Shuai	(Switzerland) Viktorija Golubic (Q)
(Sweden) Johanna Larsson	(Paraguay) Verónica Cepede Royg (Q)	(Slovenia) Polona Hercog	(France) Caroline Garcia
1st round out
(Slovakia) Magdaléna Rybáriková	(Czech Republic) Kristýna Plíšková	(United States) Samantha Crawford	(Italy) Francesca Schiavone
(Romania) Sorana Cîrstea (Q)	(France) Amandine Hesse (WC)	(Czech Republic) Denisa Allertová	(France) Océane Dodin (WC)
(Czech Republic) Kateřina Siniaková (Q)	(France) Tessah Andrianjafitrimo (WC)	(Australia) Arina Rodionova (WC)	(China) Zheng Saisai
(United Kingdom) Laura Robson (PR)	(Canada) Aleksandra Wozniak (PR)	(United States) Sachia Vickery (Q)	(Belarus) Victoria Azarenka [5]
(Germany) Angelique Kerber [3]	(France) Alizé Lim (WC)	(Turkey) İpek Soylu (Q)	(Germany) Anna-Lena Friedsam
(United Kingdom) Johanna Konta [20]	(Belarus) Olga Govortsova	(Australia) Daria Gavrilova	(Croatia) Donna Vekić
(Estonia) Anett Kontaveit	(United States) Lauren Davis	(Belgium) Kirsten Flipkens	(Serbia) Jelena Janković [23]
(Romania) Monica Niculescu [31]	(Germany) Mona Barthel	(Germany) Laura Siegemund	(Spain) Sílvia Soler Espinosa (LL)
(Italy) Roberta Vinci [7]	(Ukraine) Maryna Zanevska (Q)	(United Kingdom) Naomi Broady	(United States) Bethanie Mattek-Sands
(Czech Republic) Karolína Plíšková [17]	(United States) Madison Brengle	(Spain) Lara Arruabarrena	(Montenegro) Danka Kovinić
(Kazakhstan) Yaroslava Shvedova	(United States) Nicole Gibbs	(Belarus) Aliaksandra Sasnovich	(Spain) Sara Sorribes Tormo (Q)
(United States) Varvara Lepchenko	(Romania) Alexandra Dulgheru	(United States) Christina McHale	(Slovakia) Anna Karolína Schmiedlová
(Japan) Nao Hibino	(Germany) Carina Witthöft	(Slovakia) Daniela Hantuchová (Q)	(Latvia) Jeļena Ostapenko [32]
(Japan) Misaki Doi	(Kazakhstan) Galina Voskoboeva (PR)	(United States) Alison Riske	(Russia) Vitalia Diatchenko (PR)
(Italy) Sara Errani [16]	(Poland) Magda Linette	(Germany) Sabine Lisicki	(Russia) Margarita Gasparyan
(Czech Republic) Lucie Hradecká (Q)	(Spain) Lourdes Domínguez Lino	(Ukraine) Lesia Tsurenko	(Serbia) Bojana Jovanovski

== Singles seeds ==
The following are the seeded players and notable players who withdrew from the event. Seedings are based on ATP and WTA rankings as of 16 May 2016. Rank and points before are as of 23 May 2016.
An * in pink signifies the player is out of the event.

=== Men's singles ===
Seed	Rank	Player	Points before	Points defending	Points won	Points after	Status
1	1	(Serbia) Novak Djokovic	16,150	1,200	2,000	16,950	Champion, won against (United Kingdom) Andy Murray [2]
2	2	(United Kingdom) Andy Murray	8,435	720	1,200	8,915	Runner up, lost to (Serbia) Novak Djokovic [1]
3	4	(Switzerland) Stan Wawrinka	6,315	2,000	720	5,035	Semifinals lost to (United Kingdom) Andy Murray [2]
4	5	(Spain) Rafael Nadal	5,675	360	90	5,405	Third round withdrew due to a left wrist injury
5	6	(Japan) Kei Nishikori	4,470	360	180	4,290	Fourth round lost to (France) Richard Gasquet [9]
6	7	(France) Jo-Wilfried Tsonga	3,355	720	90	2,725	Third round retired against (Latvia) Ernests Gulbis
7	8	(Czech Republic) Tomáš Berdych	2,850	180	360	3,030	Quarterfinals lost to (Serbia) Novak Djokovic [1]
8	9	(Canada) Milos Raonic	2,785	0	180	2,965	Fourth round lost to (Spain) Albert Ramos Viñolas
9	12	(France) Richard Gasquet	2,725	180	360	2,905	Quarterfinals lost to (United Kingdom) Andy Murray [2]
10	10	(Croatia) Marin Čilić	2,775	180	10	2,605	First round lost to (Argentina) Marco Trungelliti [Q]
11	11	(Spain) David Ferrer	2,740	360	180	2,560	Fourth round lost to (Czech Republic) Tomáš Berdych [7]
12	13	(Belgium) David Goffin	2,570	90	360	2,840	Quarterfinals lost to (Austria) Dominic Thiem [13]
13	15	(Austria) Dominic Thiem	2,430	45	720	3,105	Semifinals lost to (Serbia) Novak Djokovic [1]
14	16	(Spain) Roberto Bautista Agut	2,015	45	180	2,150	Fourth round lost to (Serbia) Novak Djokovic [1]
15	17	(United States) John Isner	1,965	45	180	2,100	Fourth round lost to (United Kingdom) Andy Murray [2]
16	18	(France) Gilles Simon	1,945	180	90	1,855	Third round lost to (Serbia) Viktor Troicki [22]
17	19	(Australia) Nick Kyrgios	1,855	90	90	1,855	Third round lost to (France) Richard Gasquet [9]
18	20	(South Africa) Kevin Anderson	1,840	90	10	1,760	First round lost to (France) Stéphane Robert [WC]
19	21	(France) Benoît Paire	1,641	90	45	1,596	Second round lost to (Russia) Teymuraz Gabashvili
20	22	(Australia) Bernard Tomic	1,625	45	45	1,625	Second round lost to (Croatia) Borna Ćorić
21	23	(Spain) Feliciano López	1,550	10	90	1,630	Third round lost to (Spain) David Ferrer [11]
22	24	(Serbia) Viktor Troicki	1,535	45	180	1,670	Fourth round lost to (Switzerland) Stan Wawrinka [3]
23	25	(United States) Jack Sock	1,505	180	90	1,415	Third round lost to (Spain) Albert Ramos Viñolas
24	26	(Germany) Philipp Kohlschreiber	1,485	45	10	1,450	First round lost to (Spain) Nicolás Almagro
25	27	(Uruguay) Pablo Cuevas	1,450	90	90	1,450	Third round lost to (Czech Republic) Tomáš Berdych [7]
26	29	(Portugal) João Sousa	1,275	45	45	1,275	Second round lost to (Latvia) Ernests Gulbis
27	28	(Croatia) Ivo Karlović	1,280	10	90	1,360	Third round lost to (United Kingdom) Andy Murray [2]
~~28~~	~~30~~	(Ukraine) ~~Alexandr Dolgopolov~~	1,270	10	0	1,260	Withdrew due to a strained muscle
29	31	(France) Lucas Pouille	1,266	0	45	1,311	Second round lost to (Slovakia) Andrej Martin [LL]
30	32	(France) Jérémy Chardy	1,265	180	90	1,175	Third round lost to (Switzerland) Stan Wawrinka [3]
31	35	(Argentina) Federico Delbonis	1,165	10	10	1,165	First round lost to (Spain) Pablo Carreño Busta
32	33	(Italy) Fabio Fognini	1,205	45	10	1,170	First round lost to (Spain) Marcel Granollers
33	34	(United States) Steve Johnson	1,190	90	10	1,110	First round lost to (Spain) Fernando Verdasco

==== Withdrawn players ====
Rank	Player	Points before	Points defending	Points after	Withdrawal reason
3	(Switzerland) Roger Federer	7,015	360	6,655	Back injury
14	(France) Gaël Monfils	2,470	180	2,290	Viral infection

=== Women's singles ===
Seed	Rank	Player	Points before	Points defending	Points won	Points after	Status
1	1	(United States) Serena Williams	9,030	2,000	1,300	8,330	Runner-up, lost to (Spain) Garbiñe Muguruza [4]
2	2	(Poland) Agnieszka Radwańska	5,850	10	240	6,080	Fourth round lost to (Bulgaria) Tsvetana Pironkova
3	3	(Germany) Angelique Kerber	5,740	130	10	5,660	First round lost to (Netherlands) Kiki Bertens
4	4	(Spain) Garbiñe Muguruza	5,196	430	2,000	6,766	Champion, won against (United States) Serena Williams [1]
5	5	(Belarus) Victoria Azarenka	4,341	130	10	4,222	First round retired against (Italy) Karin Knapp
6	6	(Romania) Simona Halep	4,301	70	240	4,471	Fourth round lost to (Australia) Samantha Stosur [21]
7	7	(Italy) Roberta Vinci	3,405	10	10	3,405	First round lost to (Ukraine) Kateryna Bondarenko
8	9	(Switzerland) Timea Bacsinszky	3,150	780	430	2,800	Quarterfinals lost to (Netherlands) Kiki Bertens
9	11	(United States) Venus Williams	2,886	10	240	3,116	Fourth round lost to (Switzerland) Timea Bacsinszky [8]
10	12	(Czech Republic) Petra Kvitová	2,878	240	130	2,768	Third round lost to (United States) Shelby Rogers
11	13	(Czech Republic) Lucie Šafářová	2,843	1,300	130	1,673	Third round lost to (Australia) Samantha Stosur [21]
12	14	(Spain) Carla Suárez Navarro	2,585	130	240	2,695	Fourth round lost to (Kazakhstan) Yulia Putintseva
13	15	(Russia) Svetlana Kuznetsova	2,585	70	240	2,755	Fourth round lost to (Spain) Garbiñe Muguruza [4]
14	16	(Serbia) Ana Ivanovic	2,560	780	130	1,910	Third round lost to (Ukraine) Elina Svitolina [18]
15	17	(United States) Madison Keys	2,482	130	240	2,592	Fourth round lost to (Netherlands) Kiki Bertens
16	18	(Italy) Sara Errani	2,450	430	10	2,030	First round lost to (Bulgaria) Tsvetana Pironkova
17	19	(Czech Republic) Karolína Plíšková	2,420	70	10	2,360	First round lost to (United States) Shelby Rogers
18	20	(Ukraine) Elina Svitolina	2,416	430	240	2,226	Fourth round lost to (United States) Serena Williams [1]
19	22	(United States) Sloane Stephens	2,260	240	130	2,150	Third round lost to (Bulgaria) Tsvetana Pironkova
20	21	(United Kingdom) Johanna Konta	2,280	40	10	2,250	First round lost to (Germany) Julia Görges
21	24	(Australia) Samantha Stosur	2,050	130	780	2,700	Semifinals lost to (Spain) Garbiñe Muguruza [4]
22	25	(Slovakia) Dominika Cibulková	1,951	0	130	2,081	Third round lost to (Spain) Carla Suárez Navarro [12]
23	26	(Serbia) Jelena Janković	1,940	10	10	1,940	First round lost to (Germany) Tatjana Maria
24	27	(Russia) Anastasia Pavlyuchenkova	1,840	10	130	1,960	Third round lost to (Russia) Svetlana Kuznetsova [13]
25	28	(Romania) Irina-Camelia Begu	1,655	130	240	1,765	Fourth round lost to (United States) Shelby Rogers
26	30	(France) Kristina Mladenovic	1,550	130	130	1,550	Third round lost to (United States) Serena Williams [1]
27	29	(Russia) Ekaterina Makarova	1,552	240	70	1,382	Second round lost to (Belgium) Yanina Wickmayer
28	31	(Germany) Andrea Petkovic	1,545	130	70	1,485	Second round lost to (Kazakhstan) Yulia Putintseva
29	32	(Russia) Daria Kasatkina	1,538	(50)^{†}	130	1,618	Third round lost to (Netherlands) Kiki Bertens
30	33	(Czech Republic) Barbora Strýcová	1,520	10	130	1,640	Third round lost to (Poland) Agnieszka Radwańska [2]
31	35	(Romania) Monica Niculescu	1,450	10+140	10+55	1,365	First round lost to (France) Pauline Parmentier
32	36	(Latvia) Jeļena Ostapenko	1,365	(13)^{†}	10	1,362	First round lost to (Japan) Naomi Osaka

† The player did not qualify for the tournament in 2015. Accordingly, points for her 16th best result are deducted instead.

==== Withdrawn players ====
Rank	Player	Points before	Points defending	Points after	Withdrawal reason
8	(Switzerland) Belinda Bencic	3,330	70	3,260	Lower back injury
10	(Italy) Flavia Pennetta	2,963	240	2,723	Retirement
23	(Russia) Maria Sharapova	2,141	240	1,901	Provisional suspension
34	(Denmark) Caroline Wozniacki	1,456	70	1,386	Right ankle injury

== Doubles seeds ==
=== Men's doubles ===
Team		Rank^{1}	Seed
(France) Pierre-Hugues Herbert	(France) Nicolas Mahut	8	1
(Netherlands) Jean-Julien Rojer	(Romania) Horia Tecău	9	2
(Croatia) Ivan Dodig	(Brazil) Marcelo Melo	10	3
(United Kingdom) Jamie Murray	(Brazil) Bruno Soares	13	4
(United States) Bob Bryan	(United States) Mike Bryan	15	5
(India) Rohan Bopanna	(Romania) Florin Mergea	24	6
(Canada) Vasek Pospisil	(United States) Jack Sock	35	7
(South Africa) Raven Klaasen	(United States) Rajeev Ram	44	8
(Poland) Łukasz Kubot	(Austria) Alexander Peya	44	9
(Philippines) Treat Huey	(Belarus) Max Mirnyi	46	10
(Finland) Henri Kontinen	(Australia) John Peers	47	11
(Czech Republic) Radek Štěpánek	(Serbia) Nenad Zimonjić	49	12
(Colombia) Juan Sebastián Cabal	(Colombia) Robert Farah	50	13
(Canada) Daniel Nestor	(Pakistan) Aisam-ul-Haq Qureshi	66	14
(Spain) Feliciano López	(Spain) Marc López	70	15
(Poland) Marcin Matkowski	(India) Leander Paes	70	16

- ^{1} Rankings are as of 16 May 2016.

=== Women's doubles ===
Team		Rank	Seed
(Switzerland) Martina Hingis	(India) Sania Mirza	2	1
(United States) Bethanie Mattek-Sands	(Czech Republic) Lucie Šafářová	10	2
(Chinese Taipei) Chan Hao-ching	(Chinese Taipei) Chan Yung-jan	11	3
(Hungary) Tímea Babos	(Kazakhstan) Yaroslava Shvedova	18	4
(France) Caroline Garcia	(France) Kristina Mladenovic	19	5
(Czech Republic) Andrea Hlaváčková	(Czech Republic) Lucie Hradecká	22	6
(Russia) Ekaterina Makarova	(Russia) Elena Vesnina	24	7
(United States) Raquel Atawo	(United States) Abigail Spears	40	8
(China) Xu Yifan	(China) Zheng Saisai	42	9
(Germany) Julia Görges	(Czech Republic) Karolína Plíšková	47	10
(Slovenia) Andreja Klepač	(Slovenia) Katarina Srebotnik	53	11
(Spain) Lara Arruabarrena	(Italy) Sara Errani	57	12
(Spain) Anabel Medina Garrigues	(Spain) Arantxa Parra Santonja	59	13
~~(Romania) Irina-Camelia Begu~~	~~(Romania) Monica Niculescu~~	~~63~~	~~14~~
(United States) Vania King	(Russia) Alla Kudryavtseva	64	15
(Chinese Taipei) Chuang Chia-jung	(Chinese Taipei) Hsieh Su-wei	74	16

- ^{1} Rankings are as of 16 May 2016.

=== Mixed doubles ===
Team		Rank^{1}	Seed
(Chinese Taipei) Chan Hao-ching	(United Kingdom) Jamie Murray	9	1
(India) Sania Mirza	(Croatia) Ivan Dodig	10	2
(France) Kristina Mladenovic	(France) Pierre-Hugues Herbert	17	3
(Kazakhstan) Yaroslava Shvedova	(Romania) Florin Mergea	17	4
(Russia) Elena Vesnina	(Brazil) Bruno Soares	19	5
(Czech Republic) Andrea Hlaváčková	(France) Édouard Roger-Vasselin	27	6
(Chinese Taipei) Chan Yung-jan	(Belarus) Max Mirnyi	27	7
(United States) CoCo Vandeweghe	(United States) Bob Bryan	29	8

- ^{1} Rankings are as of 16 May 2016.

== Main draw wildcard entries ==
The following players were given wildcards to the main draw based on internal selection and recent performances.

=== Men's singles ===
- (France) Grégoire Barrère
- (France) Julien Benneteau
- (France) Mathias Bourgue
- (United States) Bjorn Fratangelo
- (France) Quentin Halys
- (France) ~~Constant Lestienne~~ (Revoked due to a minor breach for corruption)
- (France) Stéphane Robert
- (Australia) Jordan Thompson

=== Women's singles ===
- (France) Tessah Andrianjafitrimo
- (France) Océane Dodin
- (France) Myrtille Georges
- (France) Amandine Hesse
- (France) Alizé Lim
- (France) Virginie Razzano
- (Australia) Arina Rodionova
- (United States) Taylor Townsend

=== Men's doubles ===
- (France) Grégoire Barrère / (France) Quentin Halys
- (France) Julien Benneteau / (France) Édouard Roger-Vasselin
- (France) Mathias Bourgue / (France) Calvin Hemery
- (France) Kenny de Schepper / (France) Maxime Teixeira
- (France) David Guez / (France) Vincent Millot
- (France) Tristan Lamasine / (France) Albano Olivetti
- (France) Stéphane Robert / (France) Alexandre Sidorenko

=== Women's doubles ===
- (France) Tessah Andrianjafitrimo / (France) Claire Feuerstein
- (France) Manon Arcangioli / (France) Chloé Paquet
- (France) Clothilde de Bernardi / (France) Shérazad Reix
- (France) Fiona Ferro / (France) Virginie Razzano
- (France) Stéphanie Foretz / (France) Amandine Hesse
- (France) Myrtille Georges / (France) Alizé Lim
- (France) Mathilde Johansson / (France) Pauline Parmentier

=== Mixed doubles ===
- (France) Virginie Razzano / (France) Vincent Millot
- (France) Pauline Parmentier / (France) Julien Benneteau
- ~~(France) Chloé Paquet~~ / ~~(France) Benoît Paire~~ (withdrew to focus on other events)
- (France) Alizé Lim / (France) Paul-Henri Mathieu
- (France) Alizé Cornet / (France) Jonathan Eysseric
- (France) Mathilde Johansson / (France) Tristan Lamasine

== Main draw qualifiers ==
=== Men's singles ===
Men's singles qualifiers

1. (Germany) Tobias Kamke
2. (Czech Republic) Radek Štěpánek
3. (Belgium) Steve Darcis
4. (Germany) Jan-Lennard Struff
5. (Argentina) Marco Trungelliti
6. (Argentina) Carlos Berlocq
7. (Spain) Roberto Carballés Baena
8. (Germany) Dustin Brown
9. (Romania) Adrian Ungur
10. (Turkey) Marsel İlhan
11. (Austria) Gerald Melzer
12. (Spain) Jordi Samper Montaña
13. (France) Kenny de Schepper
14. (Georgia (country)) Nikoloz Basilashvili
15. (Serbia) Laslo Djere
16. (Moldova) Radu Albot

Lucky losers

1. (Netherlands) Igor Sijsling
2. (Czech Republic) Adam Pavlásek
3. (Slovakia) Andrej Martin
4. (Italy) Thomas Fabbiano

=== Women's singles ===
Women's singles qualifiers

1. (United States) Louisa Chirico
2. (Turkey) Çağla Büyükakçay
3. (Romania) Sorana Cîrstea
4. (United States) Sachia Vickery
5. (Paraguay) Verónica Cepede Royg
6. (Czech Republic) Kateřina Siniaková
7. (Slovakia) Daniela Hantuchová
8. (Turkey) İpek Soylu
9. (Switzerland) Viktorija Golubic
10. (Spain) Sara Sorribes Tormo
11. (Czech Republic) Lucie Hradecká
12. (Ukraine) Maryna Zanevska

Lucky loser

1. (Spain) Sílvia Soler Espinosa

== Protected ranking ==
The following players were accepted directly into the main draw using a protected ranking:

Men's singles

- (Germany) Florian Mayer (34)
- (Serbia) Janko Tipsarević (39)
- (United States) Brian Baker (56)
- (Russia) Dmitry Tursunov (89)

Women's singles

- (United Kingdom) Laura Robson (52)
- (Kazakhstan) Galina Voskoboeva (64)
- (Russia) Vitalia Diatchenko (91)
- (Canada) Aleksandra Wozniak (108)

== Champions ==
=== Seniors ===
==== Men's singles ====
- (Serbia) Novak Djokovic def. (United Kingdom) Andy Murray, 3–6, 6–1, 6–2, 6–4

==== Women's singles ====
- (Spain) Garbiñe Muguruza def. (United States) Serena Williams, 7–5, 6–4

==== Men's doubles ====
- (Spain) Feliciano López / (Spain) Marc López def. (United States) Bob Bryan / (United States) Mike Bryan, 6–4, 6–7^{(6–8)}, 6–3

==== Women's doubles ====
- (France) Caroline Garcia / (France) Kristina Mladenovic def. (Russia) Ekaterina Makarova / (Russia) Elena Vesnina, 6–3, 2–6, 6–4

==== Mixed doubles ====
- (Switzerland) Martina Hingis / (India) Leander Paes def. (India) Sania Mirza / (Croatia) Ivan Dodig, 4–6, 6–4, [10–8]

=== Juniors ===
==== Boys' singles ====
- (France) Geoffrey Blancaneaux def. (Canada) Félix Auger-Aliassime, 1–6, 6–3, 8–6

==== Girls' singles ====
- (Switzerland) Rebeka Masarova def. (United States) Amanda Anisimova, 7–5, 7–5

==== Boys' doubles ====
- (Israel) Yshai Oliel / (Czech Republic) Patrik Rikl def. (South Korea) Chung Yun-seong / (Brazil) Orlando Luz, 6–3, 6–4

==== Girls' doubles ====
- (Spain) Paula Arias Manjón / (Serbia) Olga Danilović def. (Russia) Olesya Pervushina / (Russia) Anastasia Potapova, 3–6, 6–3, [10–8]

=== Wheelchair events ===
==== Wheelchair men's singles ====
- (Argentina) Gustavo Fernández def. (United Kingdom) Gordon Reid, 7–6^{(7–4)}, 6–1

==== Wheelchair women's singles ====
- (Netherlands) Marjolein Buis def. (Germany) Sabine Ellerbrock, 6–3, 6–4

==== Wheelchair men's doubles ====
- (Japan) Shingo Kunieda / (United Kingdom) Gordon Reid def. (France) Michaël Jérémiasz / (Sweden) Stefan Olsson, 6–3, 6–2

==== Wheelchair women's doubles ====
- (Japan) Yui Kamiji / (United Kingdom) Jordanne Whiley def. (Netherlands) Jiske Griffioen / (Netherlands) Aniek van Koot, 6–4, 4–6, [10–6]

=== Other events ===
==== Legends under 45 doubles ====
- (Spain) Juan Carlos Ferrero / (Spain) Carlos Moyá def. (France) Sébastien Grosjean / (France) Fabrice Santoro, 6–4, 6–4

==== Legends over 45 doubles ====
- (Spain) Sergi Bruguera / (Croatia) Goran Ivanišević def. (France) Yannick Noah / (France) Cédric Pioline, 6–3, 7–6^{(7–2)}

==== Women's legends doubles ====
- (United States) Lindsay Davenport / (United States) Martina Navratilova def. (Spain) Conchita Martínez / (France) Nathalie Tauziat, 6–3, 6–2

== Withdrawals ==
The following players were accepted directly into the main tournament, but withdrew with injuries, suspensions or personal reasons.

Before the tournament

Men's singles

- ‡ (Spain) Tommy Robredo (49) → replaced by (Italy) Marco Cecchinato (98)
- ‡ (Australia) Thanasi Kokkinakis (81 PR) → replaced by (Bosnia and Herzegovina) Damir Džumhur (99)
- ‡ (Spain) Pablo Andújar (81) → replaced by (Brazil) Rogério Dutra Silva (100)
- ‡ (Austria) Andreas Haider-Maurer (63 PR) → replaced by (Netherlands) Thiemo de Bakker (101)
- ‡ (Argentina) Juan Martín del Potro (7 PR) → replaced by (Spain) Albert Montañés (102)
- @ (Switzerland) Roger Federer (3) → replaced by (Netherlands) Igor Sijsling (LL)
- @ (France) Gaël Monfils (16) → replaced by (Czech Republic) Adam Pavlásek (LL)
- @ (France) Constant Lestienne (WC) → replaced by (Slovakia) Andrej Martin (LL)
- § (Ukraine) Alexandr Dolgopolov (29) → replaced by (Italy) Thomas Fabbiano (LL)

Women's singles

- † (Russia) Maria Sharapova (9) → replaced by (Germany) Tatjana Maria (105)
- † (Italy) Flavia Pennetta (12) → replaced by (Spain) Lourdes Domínguez Lino (106)
- † (Australia) Ajla Tomljanović (107) → replaced by (United States) Shelby Rogers (108)
- ‡ (Belgium) Alison Van Uytvanck (70) → replaced by (Canada) Aleksandra Wozniak (108 PR)
- ‡ (Switzerland) Belinda Bencic (10) → replaced by (United States) Lauren Davis (109)
- @ (Denmark) Caroline Wozniacki (24) → replaced by (Spain) Sílvia Soler Espinosa (LL)

† – not included on entry list
‡ – withdrew from entry list before qualifying began
@ – withdrew from entry list after qualifying began
§ – withdrew from main draw

During the tournament
Men's singles

- (Spain) Rafael Nadal

== Retirements ==
Men's singles

- (Slovakia) Martin Kližan
- (Serbia) Dušan Lajović
- (France) Nicolas Mahut
- (France) Jo-Wilfried Tsonga

Women's singles

- (Czech Republic) Denisa Allertová
- (Belarus) Victoria Azarenka

Preceded by 2016 Australian Open	Grand Slam events	Succeeded by 2016 Wimbledon Championships
Preceded by 2015 French Open	French Open	Succeeded by 2017 French Open
