= 2016 French Open – Women's singles =

2016 tennis event results

Women's singles
- 2016 French Open

Final
- Champion: (Spain) Garbiñe Muguruza
- Runner-up: (United States) Serena Williams
- Score: 7–5, 6–4

Details
- Draw: 128 (12Q / 8WC)
- Seeds: 32

Events
Singles	men	women		boys	girls
Doubles	men	women	mixed	boys	girls
WC Singles	men	women	quad
WC Doubles	men	women	quad
Legends	−45	45+	women
- French Open

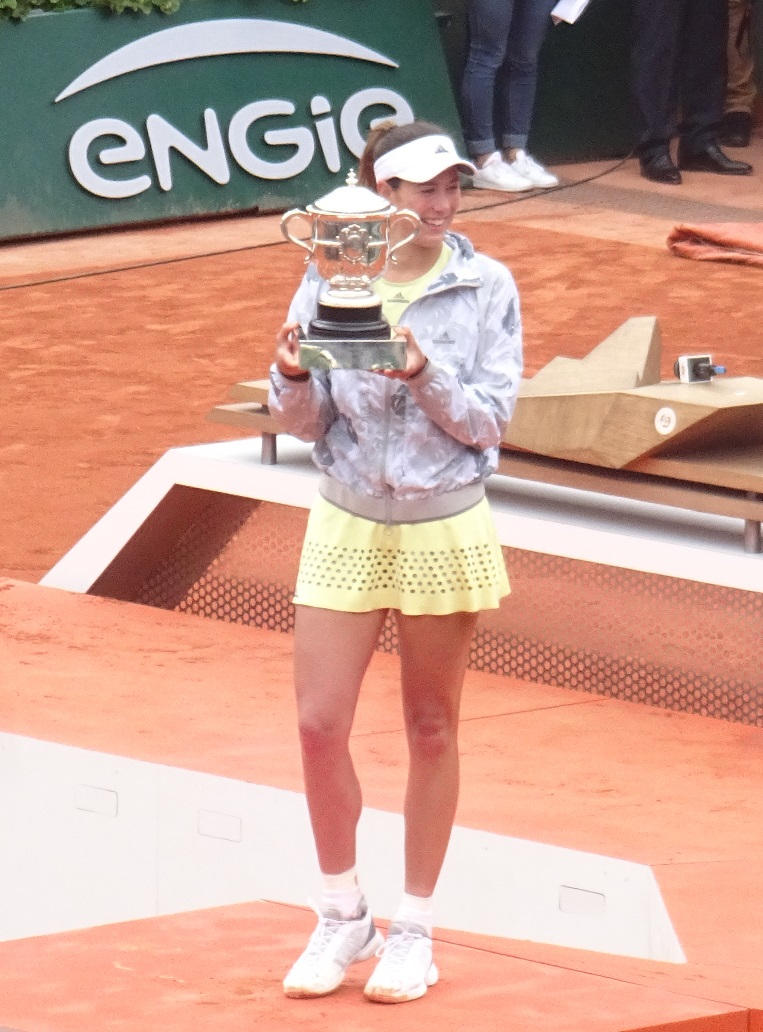
Garbiñe Muguruza holding the trophy

Garbiñe Muguruza defeated defending champion Serena Williams in the final, 7–5, 6–4 to win the women's singles tennis title at the 2016 French Open. It was her first major title, and she was the second Spaniard to win the title (after Arantxa Sánchez Vicario). Williams was attempting to become only the second player, after Steffi Graf, to complete a quadruple career Grand Slam.

Williams retained the world No. 1 singles ranking after Agnieszka Radwańska and Angelique Kerber lost in fourth and first rounds, respectively.

The tournament marked the first time that former world No. 1 Caroline Wozniacki did not play in the main draw of a singles major (being forced to withdraw due to an ankle injury) since her major debut at the 2007 French Open, ending a streak of 36 consecutive major appearances.

This was the first French Open since 2011 not won by either Maria Sharapova or Williams.

This tournament marked the final French Open appearance of 2008 champion Ana Ivanovic; she lost in the third round to Elina Svitolina. It also marked the first French Open main draw appearance for Jeļena Ostapenko, who would win the event the following year; she lost to Naomi Osaka in the first round.

== Seeds ==
1. (United States) Serena Williams (final)
2. (Poland) Agnieszka Radwańska (fourth round)
3. (Germany) Angelique Kerber (first round)
4. (Spain) Garbiñe Muguruza (champion)
5. (Belarus) Victoria Azarenka (first round, retired)
6. (Romania) Simona Halep (fourth round)
7. (Italy) Roberta Vinci (first round)
8. (Switzerland) Timea Bacsinszky (quarterfinals)
9. (United States) Venus Williams (fourth round)
10. (Czech Republic) Petra Kvitová (third round)
11. (Czech Republic) Lucie Šafářová (third round)
12. (Spain) Carla Suárez Navarro (fourth round)
13. (Russia) Svetlana Kuznetsova (fourth round)
14. (Serbia) Ana Ivanovic (third round)
15. (United States) Madison Keys (fourth round)
16. (Italy) Sara Errani (first round)

17. (Czech Republic) Karolína Plíšková (first round)
18. (Ukraine) Elina Svitolina (fourth round)
19. (United States) Sloane Stephens (third round)
20. (United Kingdom) Johanna Konta (first round)
21. (Australia) Samantha Stosur (semifinals)
22. (Slovakia) Dominika Cibulková (third round)
23. (Serbia) Jelena Janković (first round)
24. (Russia) Anastasia Pavlyuchenkova (third round)
25. (Romania) Irina-Camelia Begu (fourth round)
26. (France) Kristina Mladenovic (third round)
27. (Russia) Ekaterina Makarova (second round)
28. (Germany) Andrea Petkovic (second round)
29. (Russia) Daria Kasatkina (third round)
30. (Czech Republic) Barbora Strýcová (third round)
31. (Romania) Monica Niculescu (first round)
32. (Latvia) Jeļena Ostapenko (first round)

Click on the seed number of a player to go to their draw section.

== Draw ==
Key

- Q = Qualifier
- WC = Wild card
- LL = Lucky loser
- Alt = Alternate
- ITF = ITF entry
- PR = Protected ranking
- SR = Special ranking
- SE = Special exempt
- JE = Junior exempt
- JR = Junior Accelerator Programme entrant
- CO = College Accelerator Programme entrant
- NG = Next Gen Accelerator Program entrant
- w/o = Walkover
- r = Retired
- d = Defaulted

=== Finals ===
Quarterfinals
1	(United States) Serena Williams	5	6	6
(Kazakhstan) Yulia Putintseva	7	4	1
(Netherlands) Kiki Bertens	7	6
8	(Switzerland) Timea Bacsinszky	5	2
(United States) Shelby Rogers	5	3
4	(Spain) Garbiñe Muguruza	7	6
21	(Australia) Samantha Stosur	6	7^{8}
(Bulgaria) Tsvetana Pironkova	4	6^{6}

Semifinals
1	(United States) Serena Williams	7^{9}	6
(Netherlands) Kiki Bertens	6^{7}	4
4	(Spain) Garbiñe Muguruza	6	6
21	(Australia) Samantha Stosur	2	4

Final
1	(United States) Serena Williams	5	4
4	(Spain) Garbiñe Muguruza	7	6

=== Top half ===
==== Section 1 ====
First round
1	(United States) S Williams	6	6
(Slovakia) M Rybáriková	2	0
(Brazil) T Pereira	7	3	9
(Czech Republic) Kr Plíšková	5	6	7
(United States) S Crawford	4	0
(Hungary) T Babos	6	6
(Italy) F Schiavone	2	4
26	(France) K Mladenovic	6	6
18	(Ukraine) E Svitolina	6	6
Q	(Romania) S Cîrstea	1	3
WC	(United States) T Townsend	6	6
WC	(France) A Hesse	2	1
(Japan) K Nara	5	6	2
(Czech Republic) D Allertová	7	3	0^{r}
WC	(France) O Dodin	0	7	2
14	(Serbia) A Ivanovic	6	5	6

Second round
1	(United States) S Williams	6	6
(Brazil) T Pereira	2	1
(Hungary) T Babos	4	3
26	(France) K Mladenovic	6	6
18	(Ukraine) E Svitolina	6	6
WC	(United States) T Townsend	3	0
(Japan) K Nara	5	1
14	(Serbia) A Ivanovic	7	6

Third round
1	(United States) S Williams	6	7^{12}
26	(France) K Mladenovic	4	6^{10}
18	(Ukraine) E Svitolina	6	6
14	(Serbia) A Ivanovic	4	4

Fourth round
1	(United States) S Williams	6	6
18	(Ukraine) E Svitolina	1	1

==== Section 2 ====
First round
12	(Spain) C Suárez Navarro	6	4	6
Q	(Czech Republic) K Siniaková	2	6	2
(China) Q Wang	6	6
WC	(France) T Andrianjafitrimo	0	0
WC	(Australia) Ar Rodionova	2	3
(Croatia) A Konjuh	6	6
(China) S Zheng	3	1
22	(Slovakia) D Cibulková	6	6
28	(Germany) A Petkovic	6	6
PR	(United Kingdom) L Robson	2	2
(Kazakhstan) Y Putintseva	6	6
PR	(Canada) A Wozniak	1	1
(Latvia) A Sevastova	6	6
Q	(United States) S Vickery	2	2
(Italy) K Knapp	6	6^{6}	4
5	(Belarus) V Azarenka	3	7^{8}	0^{r}

Second round
12	(Spain) C Suárez Navarro	6	6
(China) Q Wang	1	3
(Croatia) A Konjuh	4	6	0
22	(Slovakia) D Cibulková	6	3	6
28	(Germany) A Petkovic	2	2
(Kazakhstan) Y Putintseva	6	6
(Latvia) A Sevastova	3	4
(Italy) K Knapp	6	6

Third round
12	(Spain) C Suárez Navarro	6	3	6
22	(Slovakia) D Cibulková	4	6	1
(Kazakhstan) Y Putintseva	6	6
(Italy) K Knapp	1	1

Fourth round
12	(Spain) C Suárez Navarro	5	5
(Kazakhstan) Y Putintseva	7	7

==== Section 3 ====
First round
3	(Germany) A Kerber	2	6	3
(Netherlands) K Bertens	6	3	6
WC	(France) A Lim	3	2
(Italy) C Giorgi	6	6
Q	(Turkey) İ Soylu	6	1	0
WC	(France) V Razzano	4	6	6
(Germany) A-L Friedsam	1	6	3
29	(Russia) D Kasatkina	6	4	6
20	(United Kingdom) J Konta	2	3
(Germany) J Görges	6	6
(Puerto Rico) M Puig	7	6
(Belarus) O Govortsova	5	3
(Australia) D Gavrilova	7	4	4
(Colombia) M Duque Mariño	5	6	6
(Croatia) D Vekić	3	2
15	(United States) M Keys	6	6

Second round
(Netherlands) K Bertens	6	6
(Italy) C Giorgi	4	1
WC	(France) V Razzano	6	1	3
29	(Russia) D Kasatkina	3	6	6
(Germany) J Görges	5	7^{7}	5
(Puerto Rico) M Puig	7	6^{4}	7
(Colombia) M Duque Mariño	3	2
15	(United States) M Keys	6	6

Third round
(Netherlands) K Bertens	6	3	10
29	(Russia) D Kasatkina	2	6	8
(Puerto Rico) M Puig	6^{3}	3
15	(United States) M Keys	7^{7}	6

Fourth round
(Netherlands) K Bertens	7^{7}	6
15	(United States) M Keys	6^{4}	3

==== Section 4 ====
First round
9	(United States) V Williams	7^{7}	7^{7}
(Estonia) A Kontaveit	6^{5}	6^{4}
Q	(United States) L Chirico	6	2	8
(United States) L Davis	2	6	6
(France) A Cornet	6	6
(Belgium) K Flipkens	1	0
(Germany) T Maria	6	3	6
23	(Serbia) J Janković	3	6	3
31	(Romania) M Niculescu	2	6^{2}
(France) P Parmentier	6	7^{7}
(United States) I Falconi	6	0	6
(Germany) M Barthel	4	6	2
(Germany) L Siegemund	2	2
(Canada) E Bouchard	6	6
LL	(Spain) S Soler Espinosa	3	1
8	(Switzerland) T Bacsinszky	6	6

Second round
9	(United States) V Williams	6	6
Q	(United States) L Chirico	2	1
(France) A Cornet	6	6^{5}	6
(Germany) T Maria	3	7^{7}	4
(France) P Parmentier	6	6
(United States) I Falconi	3	1
(Canada) E Bouchard	4	4
8	(Switzerland) T Bacsinszky	6	6

Third round
9	(United States) V Williams	7^{7}	1	6
(France) A Cornet	6^{5}	6	0
(France) P Parmentier	4	2
8	(Switzerland) T Bacsinszky	6	6

Fourth round
9	(United States) V Williams	2	4
8	(Switzerland) T Bacsinszky	6	6

=== Bottom half ===
==== Section 5 ====
First round
7	(Italy) R Vinci	1	3
(Ukraine) K Bondarenko	6	6
(Germany) A Beck	6	6
Q	(Ukraine) M Zanevska	1	2
(United States) C Vandeweghe	6	3	6
(United Kingdom) N Broady	4	6	3
(United States) B Mattek-Sands	7	1	3
25	(Romania) I-C Begu	5	6	6
17	(Czech Republic) Ka Plíšková	6	4	3
(United States) S Rogers	3	6	6
(Russia) E Vesnina	6	6
(United States) M Brengle	2	3
(Spain) L Arruabarrena	6^{6}	3
(Chinese Taipei) S-w Hsieh	7^{8}	6
(Montenegro) D Kovinić	2	6	5
10	(Czech Republic) P Kvitová	6	4	7

Second round
(Ukraine) K Bondarenko	6	3	5
(Germany) A Beck	4	6	7
(United States) C Vandeweghe	7^{7}	6^{4}	8
25	(Romania) I-C Begu	6^{4}	7^{7}	10
(United States) S Rogers	6	6
(Russia) E Vesnina	4	2
(Chinese Taipei) S-w Hsieh	4	1
10	(Czech Republic) P Kvitová	6	6

Third round
(Germany) A Beck	4	6	1
25	(Romania) I-C Begu	6	2	6
(United States) S Rogers	6	6^{3}	6
10	(Czech Republic) P Kvitová	0	7^{7}	0

Fourth round
25	(Romania) I-C Begu	3	4
(United States) S Rogers	6	6

==== Section 6 ====
First round
13	(Russia) S Kuznetsova	4	6	6
(Kazakhstan) Y Shvedova	6	1	4
(United States) N Gibbs	7	2	2
(United Kingdom) H Watson	5	6	6
Q	(Turkey) Ç Büyükakçay	5	7^{7}	6
(Belarus) A Sasnovich	7	6^{2}	2
Q	(Spain) S Sorribes Tormo	2	0
24	(Russia) A Pavlyuchenkova	6	6
27	(Russia) E Makarova	5	6	6
(United States) V Lepchenko	7	4	3
(Belgium) Y Wickmayer	6	6
(Romania) A Dulgheru	1	3
WC	(France) M Georges	6^{7}	6	6
(United States) C McHale	7^{9}	0	3
(Slovakia) AK Schmiedlová	6	3	3
4	(Spain) G Muguruza	3	6	6

Second round
13	(Russia) S Kuznetsova	6	6
(United Kingdom) H Watson	1	3
Q	(Turkey) Ç Büyükakçay	3	6	1
24	(Russia) A Pavlyuchenkova	6	4	6
27	(Russia) E Makarova	6	2	2
(Belgium) Y Wickmayer	2	6	6
WC	(France) M Georges	2	0
4	(Spain) G Muguruza	6	6

Third round
13	(Russia) S Kuznetsova	6	6
24	(Russia) A Pavlyuchenkova	1	4
(Belgium) Y Wickmayer	3	0
4	(Spain) G Muguruza	6	6

Fourth round
13	(Russia) S Kuznetsova	3	4
4	(Spain) G Muguruza	6	6

==== Section 7 ====
First round
6	(Romania) S Halep	6	6
(Japan) N Hibino	2	0
(Kazakhstan) Z Diyas	2	6	6
(Germany) C Witthöft	6	4	2
(Croatia) M Lučić-Baroni	6	6
Q	(Slovakia) D Hantuchová	1	2
(Japan) N Osaka	6	7
32	(Latvia) J Ostapenko	4	5
21	(Australia) S Stosur	6	4	6
(Japan) M Doi	2	6	3
(China) S Zhang	7	6
PR	(Kazakhstan) G Voskoboeva	5	2
(United States) A Riske	2	6	2
Q	(Switzerland) V Golubic	6	1	6
PR	(Russia) V Diatchenko	0	2
11	(Czech Republic) L Šafářová	6	6

Second round
6	(Romania) S Halep	7^{7}	6
(Kazakhstan) Z Diyas	6^{5}	2
(Croatia) M Lučić-Baroni	3	3
(Japan) N Osaka	6	6
21	(Australia) S Stosur	6	6
(China) S Zhang	3	4
Q	(Switzerland) V Golubic	2	2
11	(Czech Republic) L Šafářová	6	6

Third round
6	(Romania) S Halep	4	6	6
(Japan) N Osaka	6	2	3
21	(Australia) S Stosur	6	6^{0}	7
11	(Czech Republic) L Šafářová	3	7^{7}	5

Fourth round
6	(Romania) S Halep	6^{0}	3
21	(Australia) S Stosur	7^{7}	6

==== Section 8 ====
First round
16	(Italy) S Errani	3	2
(Bulgaria) T Pironkova	6	6
(Sweden) J Larsson	6	4	7
(Poland) M Linette	3	6	5
Q	(Paraguay) V Cepede Royg	6	6
(Germany) S Lisicki	2	2
(Russia) M Gasparyan	4	3
19	(United States) S Stephens	6	6
30	(Czech Republic) B Strýcová	6	7
Q	(Czech Republic) L Hradecká	4	5
(Slovenia) P Hercog	6	7^{7}
(Spain) L Domínguez Lino	4	6^{4}
(Ukraine) L Tsurenko	3	5
(France) C Garcia	6	7
(Serbia) B Jovanovski	0	2
2	(Poland) A Radwańska	6	6

Second round
(Bulgaria) T Pironkova	7	7^{8}
(Sweden) J Larsson	5	6^{6}
Q	(Paraguay) V Cepede Royg	6^{0}	1
19	(United States) S Stephens	7^{7}	6
30	(Czech Republic) B Strýcová	6	6
(Slovenia) P Hercog	4	4
(France) C Garcia	2	4
2	(Poland) A Radwańska	6	6

Third round
(Bulgaria) T Pironkova	6	6
19	(United States) S Stephens	2	1
30	(Czech Republic) B Strýcová	2	7^{8}	2
2	(Poland) A Radwańska	6	6^{6}	6

Fourth round
(Bulgaria) T Pironkova	2	6	6
2	(Poland) A Radwańska	6	3	3

== Championship match statistics ==
Category	(Spain) Muguruza	(United States) S. Williams
1st serve %	46/79 (58%)	34/69 (49%)
1st serve points won	34 of 46 = 74%	24 of 34 = 71%
2nd serve points won	15 of 33 = 45%	15 of 35 = 43%
Total service points won	49 of 79 = 62.03%	39 of 69 = 56.52%
Aces	4	7
Double faults	9	4
Winners	18	23
Unforced errors	25	22
Net points won	5 of 10 = 50%	4 of 6 = 67%
Break points converted	4 of 10 = 40%	2 of 8 = 25%
Return points won	30 of 69 = 43%	30 of 79 = 38%
Total points won	79	69

Preceded by 2016 Australian Open – Women's singles	Grand Slam women's singles	Succeeded by 2016 Wimbledon Championships – Women's singles
