= 2016 French Open – Women's doubles =

Women's doubles
- 2016 French Open

Final
- Champions: (France) Caroline Garcia (France) Kristina Mladenovic
- Runners-up: (Russia) Ekaterina Makarova (Russia) Elena Vesnina
- Score: 6–3, 2–6, 6–4

Details
- Draw: 64 (7 WC )
- Seeds: 16

Events
Singles	men	women		boys	girls
Doubles	men	women	mixed	boys	girls
WC Singles	men	women	quad
WC Doubles	men	women	quad
Legends	−45	45+	women
← 2015 ·	French Open	· 2017 →

Caroline Garcia and Kristina Mladenovic defeated Ekaterina Makarova and Elena Vesnina in the final, 6–3, 2–6, 6–4 to win the women's doubles tennis title at the 2016 French Open. Garcia and Mladenovic became the first all-French pair to win the title since Gail Sherriff Chanfreau and Françoise Dürr in 1971, and the first of any Frenchwomen since Mary Pierce in 2000, partnering Martina Hingis.

Bethanie Mattek-Sands and Lucie Šafářová were the defending champions, but lost in the first round to Kiki Bertens and Johanna Larsson.

Martina Hingis and Sania Mirza were attempting to complete a non-calendar-year Grand Slam, but lost in the third round to Barbora Krejčíková and Kateřina Siniaková. It would have been Hingis' second non-calendar-year Grand Slam, following her first in 1998–99, and also would have completed a triple career Grand Slam in women's doubles.

This marked the first major main draw appearance of the team of Krejčíková and Siniaková; they reached the semifinals before losing to Makarova and Vesnina.

== Seeds ==
1. (Switzerland) Martina Hingis / (India) Sania Mirza (third round)
2. (United States) Bethanie Mattek-Sands / (Czech Republic) Lucie Šafářová (first round)
3. (Chinese Taipei) Chan Hao-ching / (Chinese Taipei) Chan Yung-jan (quarterfinals)
4. (Hungary) Tímea Babos / (Kazakhstan) Yaroslava Shvedova (third round)
5. (France) Caroline Garcia / (France) Kristina Mladenovic (champions)
6. (Czech Republic) Andrea Hlaváčková / (Czech Republic) Lucie Hradecká (quarterfinals)
7. (Russia) Ekaterina Makarova / (Russia) Elena Vesnina (final)
8. (United States) Raquel Atawo / (United States) Abigail Spears (second round)

9. (China) Xu Yifan / (China) Zheng Saisai (quarterfinals)
10. (Germany) Julia Görges / (Czech Republic) Karolína Plíšková (third round)
11. (Slovenia) Andreja Klepač / (Slovenia) Katarina Srebotnik (third round)
12. (Spain) Lara Arruabarrena / (Italy) Sara Errani (first round)
13. (Spain) Anabel Medina Garrigues / (Spain) Arantxa Parra Santonja (first round)
14. (Romania) Irina-Camelia Begu / (Romania) Monica Niculescu (withdrew)
15. (United States) Vania King / (Russia) Alla Kudryavtseva (first round)
16. (Chinese Taipei) Chuang Chia-jung / (Chinese Taipei) Hsieh Su-wei (first round)

== Draw ==
=== Key ===
- Q = Qualifier
- WC = Wild card
- LL = Lucky loser
- Alt = Alternate
- ITF = ITF entry
- PR = Protected ranking
- SR = Special ranking
- SE = Special exempt
- JE = Junior exempt
- JR = Junior Accelerator Programme entrant
- CO = College Accelerator Programme entrant
- NG = Next Gen Accelerator Program entrant
- w/o = Walkover
- r = Retired
- d = Defaulted

=== Finals ===
Quarterfinals
(Czech Republic) Barbora Krejčíková (Czech Republic) Kateřina Siniaková	6	7^{11}
6	(Czech Republic) Andrea Hlaváčková (Czech Republic) Lucie Hradecká	3	6^{9}
3	(Chinese Taipei) Chan Hao-ching (Chinese Taipei) Chan Yung-jan	1	3
7	(Russia) Ekaterina Makarova (Russia) Elena Vesnina	6	6
9	(China) Xu Yifan (China) Zheng Saisai	2	4
(Russia) Margarita Gasparyan (Russia) Svetlana Kuznetsova	6	6
5	(France) Caroline Garcia (France) Kristina Mladenovic	7	6
(Netherlands) Kiki Bertens (Sweden) Johanna Larsson	5	3

Semifinals
(Czech Republic) Barbora Krejčíková (Czech Republic) Kateřina Siniaková	4	2
7	(Russia) Ekaterina Makarova (Russia) Elena Vesnina	6	6
(Russia) Margarita Gasparyan (Russia) Svetlana Kuznetsova	4	6	3
5	(France) Caroline Garcia (France) Kristina Mladenovic	6	4	6

Final
7	(Russia) Ekaterina Makarova (Russia) Elena Vesnina	3	6	4
5	(France) Caroline Garcia (France) Kristina Mladenovic	6	2	6

=== Top half ===
==== Section 1 ====
First round
1	(Switzerland) M Hingis (India) S Mirza	7^{7}	6
(Russia) D Kasatkina (Russia) A Panova	6^{4}	2
PR	(Italy) K Knapp (Luxembourg) M Minella	1	7^{7}	4
(Japan) N Hibino (Japan) E Hozumi	6	6^{4}	6
(United States) N Melichar (Poland) A Rosolska	4	6^{3}
(China) C Liang (China) Y Wang	6	7^{7}
(Czech Republic) B Krejčíková (Czech Republic) K Siniaková	6	6
16	(Chinese Taipei) C-j Chuang (Chinese Taipei) S-w Hsieh	2	4
11	(Slovenia) A Klepač (Slovenia) K Srebotnik	6	6
WC	(France) F Ferro (France) V Razzano	1	1
WC	(France) M Arcangioli (France) C Paquet	3	1
(Japan) M Doi (Japan) N Osaka	6	6
(Ukraine) L Kichenok (Ukraine) N Kichenok	7^{7}	6
(Georgia (country)) O Kalashnikova (Montenegro) D Kovinić	6^{2}	4
(United States) I Falconi (Puerto Rico) M Puig	0	4
6	(Czech Republic) A Hlaváčková (Czech Republic) L Hradecká	6	6

Second round
1	(Switzerland) M Hingis (India) S Mirza	6	6
(Japan) N Hibino (Japan) E Hozumi	2	0
(China) C Liang (China) Y Wang	6	3	4
(Czech Republic) B Krejčíková (Czech Republic) K Siniaková	3	6	6
11	(Slovenia) A Klepač (Slovenia) K Srebotnik	6	6
(Japan) M Doi (Japan) N Osaka	1	2
(Ukraine) L Kichenok (Ukraine) N Kichenok	1	3
6	(Czech Republic) A Hlaváčková (Czech Republic) L Hradecká	6	6

Third round
1	(Switzerland) M Hingis (India) S Mirza	3	2
(Czech Republic) B Krejčíková (Czech Republic) K Siniaková	6	6
11	(Slovenia) A Klepač (Slovenia) K Srebotnik	4	1
6	(Czech Republic) A Hlaváčková (Czech Republic) L Hradecká	6	6

Quarterfinals
(Czech Republic) B Krejčíková (Czech Republic) K Siniaková	6	7^{11}
6	(Czech Republic) A Hlaváčková (Czech Republic) L Hradecká	3	6^{9}

==== Section 2 ====
First round
3	(Chinese Taipei) H-c Chan (Chinese Taipei) Y-j Chan	6	6
(Ukraine) K Bondarenko (Ukraine) O Savchuk	4	3
Alt	(Japan) M Kato (Japan) K Nara	6	6^{5}	3
(United Kingdom) J Rae (United Kingdom) A Smith	4	7^{7}	6
WC	(France) C de Bernardi (France) S Reix	7^{7}	3	4
(France) A Cornet (Poland) M Linette	6^{3}	6	6
(United States) M Brengle (Germany) T Maria	6	6
13	(Spain) A Medina Garrigues (Spain) A Parra Santonja	2	3
10	(Germany) J Görges (Czech Republic) Ka Plíšková	6	6
PR	(Germany) A-L Grönefeld (Czech Republic) K Peschke	4	1
(Russia) V Dushevina (Romania) R Olaru	3	0
(United States) C McHale (United States) C Vandeweghe	6	6
(Australia) D Gavrilova (Ukraine) E Svitolina	6^{6}	6^{2}
(Canada) G Dabrowski (Spain) MJ Martínez Sánchez	7^{8}	7^{7}
(Australia) S Stosur (China) S Zhang	1	4
7	(Russia) E Makarova (Russia) E Vesnina	6	6

Second round
3	(Chinese Taipei) H-c Chan (Chinese Taipei) Y-j Chan	6	6
(United Kingdom) J Rae (United Kingdom) A Smith	3	2
(France) A Cornet (Poland) M Linette	4	6	1
(United States) M Brengle (Germany) T Maria	6	2	6
10	(Germany) J Görges (Czech Republic) Ka Plíšková	3	6	7^{7}
(United States) C McHale (United States) C Vandeweghe	6	3	6^{5}
(Canada) G Dabrowski (Spain) MJ Martínez Sánchez	2	6^{5}
7	(Russia) E Makarova (Russia) E Vesnina	6	7^{7}

Third round
3	(Chinese Taipei) H-c Chan (Chinese Taipei) Y-j Chan	6	6
(United States) M Brengle (Germany) T Maria	2	4
10	(Germany) J Görges (Czech Republic) Ka Plíšková	1	6	3
7	(Russia) E Makarova (Russia) E Vesnina	6	4	6

Quarterfinals
3	(Chinese Taipei) H-c Chan (Chinese Taipei) Y-j Chan	1	3
7	(Russia) E Makarova (Russia) E Vesnina	6	6

=== Bottom half ===
==== Section 3 ====
First round
8	(United States) R Atawo (United States) A Spears	6^{3}	6	6
(United Kingdom) J Konta (United States) M Sanchez	7^{7}	4	4
(Poland) K Jans-Ignacik (Switzerland) X Knoll	6	1	3
(Serbia) A Krunić (Croatia) M Lučić-Baroni	2	6	6
(United States) N Gibbs (United Kingdom) H Watson	4	4
(Germany) S Lisicki (Germany) A Petkovic	6	6
(China) X Han (United States) V Lepchenko	4	4
9	(China) Y Xu (China) S Zheng	6	6
15	(United States) V King (Russia) A Kudryavtseva	2	3
(Russia) M Gasparyan (Russia) S Kuznetsova	6	6
(Croatia) D Jurak (Croatia) A Konjuh	6	6
WC	(France) S Foretz (France) A Hesse	4	2
(Slovakia) D Cibulková (Belgium) K Flipkens	6	6
WC	(France) M Georges (France) A Lim	2	3
(Australia) An Rodionova (Australia) Ar Rodionova	6	2	1
4	(Hungary) T Babos (Kazakhstan) Y Shvedova	4	6	6

Second round
8	(United States) R Atawo (United States) A Spears	6^{6}	3
(Serbia) A Krunić (Croatia) M Lučić-Baroni	7^{8}	6
(Germany) S Lisicki (Germany) A Petkovic	5	6	2
9	(China) Y Xu (China) S Zheng	7	3	6
(Russia) M Gasparyan (Russia) S Kuznetsova	7^{8}	5	7
(Croatia) D Jurak (Croatia) A Konjuh	6^{6}	7	5
(Slovakia) D Cibulková (Belgium) K Flipkens	4^{r}
4	(Hungary) T Babos (Kazakhstan) Y Shvedova	1

Third round
(Serbia) A Krunić (Croatia) M Lučić-Baroni	5	5
9	(China) Y Xu (China) S Zheng	7	7
(Russia) M Gasparyan (Russia) S Kuznetsova	4	7^{7}	7
4	(Hungary) T Babos (Kazakhstan) Y Shvedova	6	6^{5}	5

Quarterfinals
9	(China) Y Xu (China) S Zheng	2	4
(Russia) M Gasparyan (Russia) S Kuznetsova	6	6

==== Section 4 ====
First round
5	(France) C Garcia (France) K Mladenovic	6	6
(Germany) A Beck (Belgium) Y Wickmayer	4	2
(Slovakia) M Rybáriková (Slovakia) AK Schmiedlová	1	3
WC	(France) M Johansson (France) P Parmentier	6	6
(United States) A Muhammad (Liechtenstein) S Vogt	1	4
(Germany) A-L Friedsam (Germany) L Siegemund	6	6
(Netherlands) M Krajicek (Czech Republic) B Strýcová	1	6	7
12	(Spain) L Arruabarrena (Italy) S Errani	6	1	5
Alt	(United Kingdom) N Broady (United States) L Chirico	1	4
PR	(Russia) V Diatchenko (Kazakhstan) G Voskoboeva	6	6
(United States) S Williams (United States) V Williams	6	6
(Latvia) J Ostapenko (Kazakhstan) Y Putintseva	2	2
WC	(France) T Andrianjafitrimo (France) C Feuerstein	2	4
(Argentina) M Irigoyen (Poland) P Kania	6	6
(Netherlands) K Bertens (Sweden) J Larsson	6	6
2	(United States) B Mattek-Sands (Czech Republic) L Šafářová	4	3

Second round
5	(France) C Garcia (France) K Mladenovic	6	4	6
WC	(France) M Johansson (France) P Parmentier	1	6	2
(Germany) A-L Friedsam (Germany) L Siegemund	6	6
(Netherlands) M Krajicek (Czech Republic) B Strýcová	2	3
PR	(Russia) V Diatchenko (Kazakhstan) G Voskoboeva	6^{8}	6	0
(United States) S Williams (United States) V Williams	7^{10}	4	6
(Argentina) M Irigoyen (Poland) P Kania	4	6	2
(Netherlands) K Bertens (Sweden) J Larsson	6	3	6

Third round
5	(France) C Garcia (France) K Mladenovic	6	6
(Germany) A-L Friedsam (Germany) L Siegemund	3	2
(United States) S Williams (United States) V Williams	3	3
(Netherlands) K Bertens (Sweden) J Larsson	6	6

Quarterfinals
5	(France) C Garcia (France) K Mladenovic	7	6
(Netherlands) K Bertens (Sweden) J Larsson	5	3
