= 2017 French Open – Women's singles qualifying =

Women's singles qualifying
- 2017 French Open

Events
Singles	men	women		boys	girls
Doubles	men	women	mixed	boys	girls
WC Singles	men	women	quad
WC Doubles	men	women	quad
Legends	−45	45+	women

Qualification
Singles	men	women
- French Open

== Seeds ==
1. (Italy) Sara Errani (qualified)
2. (Czech Republic) Markéta Vondroušová (qualified)
3. (Brazil) Beatriz Haddad Maia (qualified)
4. (Netherlands) Richèl Hogenkamp (qualified)
5. (Romania) Ana Bogdan (qualified)
6. (Chinese Taipei) Chang Kai-chen (second round)
7. (China) Han Xinyun (first round)
8. (Belgium) Maryna Zanevska (qualifying competition)
9. (Belgium) Alison Van Uytvanck (qualified)
10. (Tunisia) Ons Jabeur (qualifying competition, lucky loser)
11. (Belarus) Aryna Sabalenka (first round)
12. (United States) Bethanie Mattek-Sands (qualified)
13. (United Kingdom) Heather Watson (qualifying competition)
14. (Russia) Anna Blinkova (qualifying competition)
15. (United Kingdom) Naomi Broady (first round)
16. (Serbia) Aleksandra Krunić (qualifying competition)
17. (Serbia) Nina Stojanović (first round)
18. (South Korea) Jang Su-jeong (qualifying competition)
19. (Slovakia) Rebecca Šramková (second round)
20. (United States) Nicole Gibbs (qualifying competition)
21. (Slovenia) Dalila Jakupović (first round)
22. (Germany) Tamara Korpatsch (second round)
23. (Russia) Anna Kalinskaya (first round)
24. (United States) Sachia Vickery (first round)

== Qualifiers ==
1. (Italy) Sara Errani
2. (Czech Republic) Markéta Vondroušová
3. (Brazil) Beatriz Haddad Maia
4. (Netherlands) Richèl Hogenkamp
5. (Romania) Ana Bogdan
6. (Netherlands) Quirine Lemoine
7. (Canada) Françoise Abanda
8. (Croatia) Petra Martić
9. (Belgium) Alison Van Uytvanck
10. (Japan) Miyu Kato
11. (Ukraine) Kateryna Kozlova
12. (United States) Bethanie Mattek-Sands

== Lucky losers ==
1. (Tunisia) Ons Jabeur

== Draw ==
=== First qualifier ===
First round
1	(Italy) Sara Errani	6	6
WC	(France) Sara Cakarevic	1	0
(Russia) Veronika Kudermetova	6	6
(Bulgaria) Isabella Shinikova	2	4
(Japan) Hiroko Kuwata	6^{4}	6	6
(Netherlands) Lesley Kerkhove	7^{7}	3	4
(Slovenia) Tamara Zidanšek	3	5
20	(United States) Nicole Gibbs	6	7

Second round
1	(Italy) Sara Errani	6	6
(Russia) Veronika Kudermetova	1	2
(Japan) Hiroko Kuwata	4	1
20	(United States) Nicole Gibbs	6	6

Qualifying competition
1	(Italy) Sara Errani	6	6
20	(United States) Nicole Gibbs	3	0

=== Second qualifier ===
First round
2	(Czech Republic) Markéta Vondroušová	6	6
(Argentina) Nadia Podoroska	0	1
(Russia) Ksenia Lykina	6	4	4
(Austria) Barbara Haas	1	6	6
WC	(France) Yasmine Mansouri	4	4
PR	(Russia) Alexandra Panova	6	6
(Serbia) Ivana Jorović	6^{4}	0
14	(Russia) Anna Blinkova	7^{7}	6

Second round
2	(Czech Republic) Markéta Vondroušová	6	6
(Austria) Barbara Haas	0	1
PR	(Russia) Alexandra Panova	5	7	6^{3}
14	(Russia) Anna Blinkova	7	5	7^{7}

Qualifying competition
2	(Czech Republic) Markéta Vondroušová	6	6
14	(Russia) Anna Blinkova	1	4

=== Third qualifier ===
First round
3	(Brazil) Beatriz Haddad Maia	6	6
(Spain) Sílvia Soler Espinosa	4	2
PR	(Croatia) Jana Fett	7^{7}	6
(Hungary) Fanny Stollár	6^{5}	3
(Greece) Valentini Grammatikopoulou	6	6
(Australia) Lizette Cabrera	4	3
(Switzerland) Jil Teichmann	6	6
15	(United Kingdom) Naomi Broady	4	2

Second round
3	(Brazil) Beatriz Haddad Maia	6	6
PR	(Croatia) Jana Fett	0	2
(Greece) Valentini Grammatikopoulou	0	2
(Switzerland) Jil Teichmann	6	6

Qualifying competition
3	(Brazil) Beatriz Haddad Maia	6	7^{8}
(Switzerland) Jil Teichmann	2	6^{6}

=== Fourth qualifier ===
First round
4	(Netherlands) Richèl Hogenkamp	6	6
(Japan) Akiko Omae	3	4
(Hungary) Dalma Gálfi	3	6	3
WC	(France) Jessika Ponchet	6	1	6
(Canada) Bianca Andreescu	1	6	3
(Czech Republic) Tereza Smitková	6	3	6
(Russia) Anastasiya Komardina	6	5	1
13	(United Kingdom) Heather Watson	3	7	6

Second round
4	(Netherlands) Richèl Hogenkamp	7	6
WC	(France) Jessika Ponchet	5	2
(Czech Republic) Tereza Smitková	4	6^{3}
13	(United Kingdom) Heather Watson	6	7^{7}

Qualifying competition
4	(Netherlands) Richèl Hogenkamp	6	6
13	(United Kingdom) Heather Watson	0	3

=== Fifth qualifier ===
First round
5	(Romania) Ana Bogdan	2	6	7^{7}
PR	(Romania) Alexandra Dulgheru	6	3	6^{5}
(United States) Jamie Loeb	1	3
(Turkey) Başak Eraydın	6	6
WC	(France) Audrey Albié	6	1	6
(United States) Grace Min	4	6	3
(France) Virginie Razzano	2	6	6
21	(Slovenia) Dalila Jakupović	6	3	3

Second round
5	(Romania) Ana Bogdan	6	6
(Turkey) Başak Eraydın	4	3
WC	(France) Audrey Albié	3	4
(France) Virginie Razzano	6	6

Qualifying competition
5	(Romania) Ana Bogdan	6	6
(France) Virginie Razzano	4	0

=== Sixth qualifier ===
First round
6	(Chinese Taipei) Chang Kai-chen	6	7
(United Kingdom) Tara Moore	2	5
(Netherlands) Quirine Lemoine	3	6	6
(North Macedonia) Lina Gjorcheska	6	3	3
(Netherlands) Arantxa Rus	4	7^{7}	7^{7}
(Bulgaria) Viktoriya Tomova	6	6^{5}	6^{5}
(Germany) Antonia Lottner	6	6
23	(Russia) Anna Kalinskaya	3	3

Second round
6	(Chinese Taipei) Chang Kai-chen	2	6	3
(Netherlands) Quirine Lemoine	6	2	6
(Netherlands) Arantxa Rus	6	7
(Germany) Antonia Lottner	4	5

Qualifying competition
(Netherlands) Quirine Lemoine	2	7^{7}	6
(Netherlands) Arantxa Rus	6	6^{3}	3

=== Seventh qualifier ===
First round
7	(China) Han Xinyun	2	6^{8}
(Paraguay) Montserrat González	6	7^{10}
(Canada) Françoise Abanda	6	6
WC	(France) Manon Arcangioli	3	2
(Bulgaria) Elitsa Kostova	6	6
(China) Zhang Kailin	3	3
PR	(Ukraine) Anhelina Kalinina	4	3
18	(South Korea) Jang Su-jeong	6	6

Second round
(Paraguay) Montserrat González	6	3	2
(Canada) Françoise Abanda	4	6	6
(Bulgaria) Elitsa Kostova	6	4	5
18	(South Korea) Jang Su-jeong	2	6	7

Qualifying competition
(Canada) Françoise Abanda	6	6
18	(South Korea) Jang Su-jeong	3	2

=== Eighth qualifier ===
First round
8	(Belgium) Maryna Zanevska	4	6	6
(South Korea) Han Na-lae	6	4	2
(United States) Kayla Day	6	6
(Belarus) Olga Govortsova	1	3
(United States) Irina Falconi	1	3
PR	(Croatia) Petra Martić	6	6
PR	(United States) Alexa Glatch	1	1
22	(Germany) Tamara Korpatsch	6	6

Second round
8	(Belgium) Maryna Zanevska	6	1	6
(United States) Kayla Day	2	6	4
PR	(Croatia) Petra Martić	6	6
22	(Germany) Tamara Korpatsch	0	4

Qualifying competition
8	(Belgium) Maryna Zanevska	6^{3}	7^{7}	6^{5}
PR	(Croatia) Petra Martić	7^{7}	6^{2}	7^{7}

=== Ninth qualifier ===
First round
9	(Belgium) Alison Van Uytvanck	6	7^{7}
WC	(France) Jade Suvrijn	3	6^{1}
(Uzbekistan) Sabina Sharipova	2	4
(United States) Sofia Kenin	6	6
(United States) Kristie Ahn	6	7
(United States) Asia Muhammad	4	5
(Czech Republic) Lucie Hradecká	6	6
17	(Serbia) Nina Stojanović	1	1

Second round
9	(Belgium) Alison Van Uytvanck	6	6
(United States) Sofia Kenin	3	2
(United States) Kristie Ahn	6^{3}	5
(Czech Republic) Lucie Hradecká	7^{7}	7

Qualifying competition
9	(Belgium) Alison Van Uytvanck	6	6
(Czech Republic) Lucie Hradecká	4	3

=== Tenth qualifier ===
First round
10	(Tunisia) Ons Jabeur	6	6
(Japan) Misa Eguchi	1	2
(Russia) Viktoria Kamenskaya	6	6
(Netherlands) Cindy Burger	4	2
(Australia) Arina Rodionova	4	3
(Japan) Miyu Kato	6	6
(Australia) Destanee Aiava	6^{5}	1
19	(Slovakia) Rebecca Šramková	7^{7}	6

Second round
10	(Tunisia) Ons Jabeur	7^{7}	6
(Russia) Viktoria Kamenskaya	6^{2}	1
(Japan) Miyu Kato	6	6
19	(Slovakia) Rebecca Šramková	1	2

Qualifying competition
10	(Tunisia) Ons Jabeur	3	6	4
(Japan) Miyu Kato	6	3	6

=== Eleventh qualifier ===
First round
11	(Belarus) Aryna Sabalenka	6	1	6^{3}
(Turkey) İpek Soylu	4	6	7^{7}
(Switzerland) Conny Perrin	2	6	3
(Ukraine) Kateryna Kozlova	6	4	6
(Czech Republic) Tereza Martincová	6	6
(Japan) Riko Sawayanagi	4	3
WC	(Canada) Aleksandra Wozniak	3	1
16	(Serbia) Aleksandra Krunić	6	6

Second round
(Turkey) İpek Soylu	6^{4}	6	3
(Ukraine) Kateryna Kozlova	7^{7}	2	6
(Czech Republic) Tereza Martincová	4	3
16	(Serbia) Aleksandra Krunić	6	6

Qualifying competition
(Ukraine) Kateryna Kozlova	3	6	6
16	(Serbia) Aleksandra Krunić	6	3	3

=== Twelfth qualifier ===
First round
12	(United States) Bethanie Mattek-Sands	4	6	6
(Italy) Jasmine Paolini	6	2	3
(Russia) Alla Kudryavtseva	2	3
(Slovakia) Viktória Kužmová	6	6
WC	(France) Harmony Tan	6	4	4
(Slovenia) Polona Hercog	3	6	6
PR	(Kazakhstan) Zarina Diyas	6	1	6
24	(United States) Sachia Vickery	0	6	2

Second round
12	(United States) Bethanie Mattek-Sands	7^{8}	6
(Slovakia) Viktória Kužmová	6^{6}	4
(Slovenia) Polona Hercog	0	3
PR	(Kazakhstan) Zarina Diyas	6	6

Qualifying competition
12	(United States) Bethanie Mattek-Sands	6	6
PR	(Kazakhstan) Zarina Diyas	4	1
