= 2017 French Open – Men's singles qualifying =

Men's singles qualifying
- 2017 French Open

Events
Singles	men	women		boys	girls
Doubles	men	women	mixed	boys	girls
WC Singles	men	women	quad
WC Doubles	men	women	quad
Legends	−45	45+	women

Qualification
Singles	men	women
- French Open

This article displays the qualifying draw for men's singles at the 2017 French Open.

== Seeds ==
1. (Romania) Marius Copil (qualified)
2. (Czech Republic) Adam Pavlásek (first round)
3. (Argentina) Facundo Bagnis (first round, retired)
4. (Japan) Taro Daniel (qualified)
5. (Slovakia) Norbert Gombos (qualifying competition)
6. (Italy) Thomas Fabbiano (first round)
7. (Switzerland) Henri Laaksonen (first round)
8. (Italy) Marco Cecchinato (qualifying competition)
9. (Colombia) Santiago Giraldo (qualified)
10. (Italy) Alessandro Giannessi (second round)
11. (Slovakia) Lukáš Lacko (first round)
12. (Slovakia) Andrej Martin (first round)
13. (Argentina) Guido Pella (qualified)
14. (Barbados) Darian King (first round)
15. (Austria) Gerald Melzer (qualifying competition)
16. (France) Paul-Henri Mathieu (qualified)
17. (Slovenia) Blaž Kavčič (second round)
18. (Russia) Andrey Rublev (qualifying competition, lucky loser)
19. (Norway) Casper Ruud (second round)
20. (Italy) Luca Vanni (second round)
21. (Ukraine) Sergiy Stakhovsky (qualified)
22. (Argentina) Guido Andreozzi (qualifying competition)
23. (Belgium) Ruben Bemelmans (first round)
24. (Germany) Maximilian Marterer (second round)
25. (Canada) Peter Polansky (second round)
26. (South Korea) Lee Duck-hee (first round)
27. (Spain) Roberto Carballés Baena (first round)
28. (Serbia) Laslo Đere (second round)
29. (Belgium) Arthur De Greef (qualified)
30. (Brazil) João Souza (first round)
31. (Germany) Peter Gojowczyk (qualifying competition)
32. (United States) Bjorn Fratangelo (qualified)

== Qualifiers ==
1. (Romania) Marius Copil
2. (Belgium) Arthur De Greef
3. (Chile) Nicolás Jarry
4. (Japan) Taro Daniel
5. (Slovakia) Jozef Kovalík
6. (Greece) Stefanos Tsitsipas
7. (France) Maxime Hamou
8. (Italy) Simone Bolelli
9. (Colombia) Santiago Giraldo
10. (Argentina) Marco Trungelliti
11. (Russia) Teymuraz Gabashvili
12. (Ukraine) Sergiy Stakhovsky
13. (Argentina) Guido Pella
14. (Italy) Stefano Napolitano
15. (United States) Bjorn Fratangelo
16. (France) Paul-Henri Mathieu

== Lucky loser ==
1. (Russia) Andrey Rublev

== Qualifying draw ==
=== First qualifier ===
First round
1	(Romania) Marius Copil	6	4	6
(Canada) Denis Shapovalov	0	6	2
(Belarus) Ilya Ivashka	6	6
(Belgium) Kimmer Coppejans	2	2
(Belgium) Joris De Loore	7	7^{7}
(Chinese Taipei) Chen Ti	5	6^{4}
(Italy) Stefano Travaglia	4	7^{7}	4
31	(Germany) Peter Gojowczyk	6	6^{5}	6

Second round
1	(Romania) Marius Copil	6	6
(Belarus) Ilya Ivashka	2	2
(Belgium) Joris De Loore	3	6^{7}
31	(Germany) Peter Gojowczyk	6	7^{9}

Qualifying competition
1	(Romania) Marius Copil	6	6^{5}	7^{9}
31	(Germany) Peter Gojowczyk	4	7^{7}	6^{7}

=== Second qualifier ===
First round
2	(Czech Republic) Adam Pavlásek	6	3	4
(Germany) Daniel Masur	2	6	6
(Serbia) Filip Krajinović	3	7^{7}	6
(Australia) Sam Groth	6	6^{3}	2
(Argentina) Máximo González	7	6
(El Salvador) Marcelo Arévalo	5	1
(Spain) Enrique López-Pérez	6^{2}	0
29	(Belgium) Arthur De Greef	7^{7}	6

Second round
(Germany) Daniel Masur	6	6
(Serbia) Filip Krajinović	4	2
(Argentina) Máximo González	6	0	6^{5}
29	(Belgium) Arthur De Greef	3	6	7^{7}

Qualifying competition
(Germany) Daniel Masur	3	4
29	(Belgium) Arthur De Greef	6	6

=== Third qualifier ===
First round
3	(Argentina) Facundo Bagnis	2^{r}
(Chile) Nicolás Jarry	5
(Kazakhstan) Dmitry Popko	6	6
(Spain) Rubén Ramírez Hidalgo	2	4
(United States) Reilly Opelka	4	7^{7}	6
PR	(Spain) Daniel Muñoz de la Nava	6	6^{4}	4
(Argentina) Leonardo Mayer	6	6
30	(Brazil) João Souza	2	1

Second round
(Chile) Nicolás Jarry	6	6
(Kazakhstan) Dmitry Popko	4	3
(United States) Reilly Opelka	5	7^{9}	6
(Argentina) Leonardo Mayer	7	6^{7}	3

Qualifying competition
(Chile) Nicolás Jarry	7^{7}	3	6
(United States) Reilly Opelka	6^{4}	6	3

=== Fourth qualifier ===
First round
4	(Japan) Taro Daniel	7^{7}	6
(Japan) Hiroki Moriya	6^{3}	0
WC	(France) Grégoire Barrère	7	5	3
PR	(Croatia) Matija Pecotić	5	7	6
(Bosnia and Herzegovina) Mirza Bašić	7^{7}	6
(Slovenia) Blaž Rola	6^{2}	3
(Argentina) Agustín Velotti	1	3
18	(Russia) Andrey Rublev	6	6

Second round
4	(Japan) Taro Daniel	6	6
PR	(Croatia) Matija Pecotić	3	2
(Bosnia and Herzegovina) Mirza Bašić	4	7	2
18	(Russia) Andrey Rublev	6	5	6

Qualifying competition
4	(Japan) Taro Daniel	7	6^{1}	7^{7}
18	(Russia) Andrey Rublev	5	7^{7}	6^{4}

=== Fifth qualifier ===
First round
5	(Slovakia) Norbert Gombos	6	6
(Chinese Taipei) Jason Jung	4	4
(Spain) Daniel Gimeno Traver	6^{4}	4
(Japan) Yasutaka Uchiyama	7^{7}	6
PR	(Netherlands) Igor Sijsling	4	0^{r}
(Slovakia) Jozef Kovalík	6	0
(Switzerland) Marco Chiudinelli	2	2
20	(Italy) Luca Vanni	6	6

Second round
5	(Slovakia) Norbert Gombos	7^{7}	6
(Japan) Yasutaka Uchiyama	6^{3}	3
(Slovakia) Jozef Kovalík	6	6
20	(Italy) Luca Vanni	4	4

Qualifying competition
5	(Slovakia) Norbert Gombos	6	4	3
(Slovakia) Jozef Kovalík	1	6	6

=== Sixth qualifier ===
First round
6	(Italy) Thomas Fabbiano	6	3	1
(Greece) Stefanos Tsitsipas	3	6	6
WC	(France) Gleb Sakharov	6	6^{5}	7^{7}
(Italy) Federico Gaio	4	7^{7}	6^{3}
(United States) Mitchell Krueger	2	1
(Germany) Oscar Otte	6	6
(Germany) Benjamin Becker	2	6	3
28	(Serbia) Laslo Đere	6	2	6

Second round
(Greece) Stefanos Tsitsipas	6	6
WC	(France) Gleb Sakharov	3	3
(Germany) Oscar Otte	7	2	7^{7}
28	(Serbia) Laslo Đere	5	6	6^{2}

Qualifying competition
(Greece) Stefanos Tsitsipas	6	6
(Germany) Oscar Otte	3	2

=== Seventh qualifier ===
First round
7	(Switzerland) Henri Laaksonen	2	3
(United States) Dennis Novikov	6	6
(Bosnia and Herzegovina) Aldin Šetkić	4	6	4
(Ecuador) Roberto Quiroz	6	4	6
WC	(France) Maxime Hamou	7	6
(Spain) Adrián Menéndez-Maceiras	5	2
(France) Tristan Lamasine	7^{7}	5	4
17	(Slovenia) Blaž Kavčič	6^{5}	7	6

Second round
(United States) Dennis Novikov	6^{3}	3
(Ecuador) Roberto Quiroz	7^{7}	6
WC	(France) Maxime Hamou	7^{9}	7
17	(Slovenia) Blaž Kavčič	6^{7}	5

Qualifying competition
(Ecuador) Roberto Quiroz	5	0
WC	(France) Maxime Hamou	7	6

=== Eighth qualifier ===
First round
8	(Italy) Marco Cecchinato	6	6
(Italy) Riccardo Bellotti	4	4
(Spain) Íñigo Cervantes	5	4
(Italy) Salvatore Caruso	7	6
PR	(Italy) Simone Bolelli	7^{7}	4	7^{8}
(Chile) Christian Garin	6^{4}	6	6^{6}
(United Kingdom) Brydan Klein	2	2
24	(Germany) Maximilian Marterer	6	6

Second round
8	(Italy) Marco Cecchinato	6	6
(Italy) Salvatore Caruso	2	1
PR	(Italy) Simone Bolelli	6	1	6
24	(Germany) Maximilian Marterer	3	6	4

Qualifying competition
8	(Italy) Marco Cecchinato	4	4
PR	(Italy) Simone Bolelli	6	6

=== Ninth qualifier ===
First round
9	(Colombia) Santiago Giraldo	6	6
(Slovenia) Grega Žemlja	1	4
(Belarus) Uladzimir Ignatik	6	6
(China) Wu Di	1	2
(United States) Tim Smyczek	6	6
(Republic of Ireland) James McGee	2	0
(Germany) Daniel Brands	1	4
22	(Argentina) Guido Andreozzi	6	6

Second round
9	(Colombia) Santiago Giraldo	6	6
(Belarus) Uladzimir Ignatik	2	4
(United States) Tim Smyczek	1	6	3
22	(Argentina) Guido Andreozzi	6	1	6

Qualifying competition
9	(Colombia) Santiago Giraldo	6	6
22	(Argentina) Guido Andreozzi	3	2

=== Tenth qualifier ===
First round
10	(Italy) Alessandro Giannessi	7	6
WC	(France) Calvin Hemery	5	3
(Italy) Matteo Donati	6	6
WC	(France) Jonathan Eysseric	4	3
(Germany) Tobias Kamke	2	7	6
(United States) Rajeev Ram	6	5	3
(Argentina) Marco Trungelliti	6^{5}	6	6
23	(Belgium) Ruben Bemelmans	7^{7}	2	3

Second round
10	(Italy) Alessandro Giannessi	3	6	6^{10}
(Italy) Matteo Donati	6	3	7^{12}
(Germany) Tobias Kamke	3	4
(Argentina) Marco Trungelliti	6	6

Qualifying competition
(Italy) Matteo Donati	5	6^{5}
(Argentina) Marco Trungelliti	7	7^{7}

=== Eleventh qualifier ===
First round
11	(Slovakia) Lukáš Lacko	4	2
(Canada) Steven Diez	6	6
(Australia) Andrew Whittington	4	1
(Portugal) Pedro Sousa	6	6
(United States) Mackenzie McDonald	6	6
(Japan) Akira Santillan	1	4
(Russia) Teymuraz Gabashvili	2	6	7
27	(Spain) Roberto Carballés Baena	6	2	5

Second round
(Canada) Steven Diez	3	5
(Portugal) Pedro Sousa	6	7
(United States) Mackenzie McDonald	6	2	5
(Russia) Teymuraz Gabashvili	4	6	7

Qualifying competition
(Portugal) Pedro Sousa	6	6^{6}	2
(Russia) Teymuraz Gabashvili	4	7^{8}	6

=== Twelfth qualifier ===
First round
12	(Slovakia) Andrej Martin	6	3	4
(Sweden) Elias Ymer	3	6	6
(Czech Republic) Jan Šátral	6	3	7^{7}
(Czech Republic) Lukáš Rosol	2	6	6^{2}
(United States) Stefan Kozlov	2	7	6
WC	(France) Corentin Moutet	6	5	4
(France) Kenny de Schepper	4	6	6^{2}
21	(Ukraine) Sergiy Stakhovsky	6	3	7^{7}

Second round
(Sweden) Elias Ymer	4	6	4
(Czech Republic) Jan Šátral	6	3	6
(United States) Stefan Kozlov	7^{7}	4	4
21	(Ukraine) Sergiy Stakhovsky	6^{5}	6	6

Qualifying competition
(Czech Republic) Jan Šátral	6	2	6^{5}
21	(Ukraine) Sergiy Stakhovsky	3	6	7^{7}

=== Thirteenth qualifier ===
First round
13	(Argentina) Guido Pella	6	6
(India) Ramkumar Ramanathan	2	1
(Australia) Marc Polmans	4	7^{7}	4
(United States) Michael Mmoh	6	6^{3}	1^{r}
WC	(France) Maxime Janvier	6	6
WC	(France) Geoffrey Blancaneaux	4	3
(Belgium) Yannik Reuter	3	2
19	(Norway) Casper Ruud	6	6

Second round
13	(Argentina) Guido Pella	6	6^{6}	6
(Australia) Marc Polmans	3	7^{8}	4
WC	(France) Maxime Janvier	7^{7}	6
19	(Norway) Casper Ruud	6^{4}	4

Qualifying competition
13	(Argentina) Guido Pella	6^{3}	6	6
WC	(France) Maxime Janvier	7^{7}	2	2

=== Fourteenth qualifier ===
First round
14	(Barbados) Darian King	4	2
(Hungary) Márton Fucsovics	6	6
(Italy) Lorenzo Giustino	4	4
(Italy) Stefano Napolitano	6	6
(Egypt) Mohamed Safwat	7^{8}	3	1
(Kazakhstan) Alexander Bublik	6^{6}	6	6
PR	(India) Yuki Bhambri	6^{5}	6^{5}
25	(Canada) Peter Polansky	7^{7}	7^{7}

Second round
(Hungary) Márton Fucsovics	1	7^{7}	6^{4}
(Italy) Stefano Napolitano	6	6^{3}	7^{7}
(Kazakhstan) Alexander Bublik	6	2	7^{7}
25	(Canada) Peter Polansky	4	6	6^{5}

Qualifying competition
(Italy) Stefano Napolitano	6	6^{5}	6
(Kazakhstan) Alexander Bublik	4	7^{7}	2

=== Fifteenth qualifier ===
First round
15	(Austria) Gerald Melzer	6	6
WC	(France) Constant Lestienne	2	2
(France) Vincent Millot	6	6
(Serbia) Miljan Zekić	3	4
PR	(United States) Bradley Klahn	6	6
(Australia) John-Patrick Smith	2	3
PR	(Australia) Matthew Ebden	2	2
32	(United States) Bjorn Fratangelo	6	6

Second round
15	(Austria) Gerald Melzer	6	6
(France) Vincent Millot	1	2
PR	(United States) Bradley Klahn	4	6^{6}
32	(United States) Bjorn Fratangelo	6	7^{8}

Qualifying competition
15	(Austria) Gerald Melzer	7	6^{5}	6^{1}
32	(United States) Bjorn Fratangelo	5	7^{7}	7^{7}

=== Sixteenth qualifier ===
First round
16	(France) Paul-Henri Mathieu	6^{0}	6	6
(Japan) Tatsuma Ito	7^{7}	2	2
PR	(Colombia) Alejandro González	7^{7}	4	7^{7}
(Croatia) Kristijan Mesaroš	6^{4}	6	6^{4}
(Czech Republic) Václav Šafránek	4	1
(United States) Denis Kudla	6	6
(Spain) Ricardo Ojeda Lara	6	6
26	(South Korea) Lee Duck-hee	2	3

Second round
16	(France) Paul-Henri Mathieu	7	6
PR	(Colombia) Alejandro González	5	1
(United States) Denis Kudla	6	6
(Spain) Ricardo Ojeda Lara	4	3

Qualifying competition
16	(France) Paul-Henri Mathieu	6	6
(United States) Denis Kudla	3	4
