= 2017 French Open – Day-by-day summaries =

The 2017 French Open described below in detail, in form of day-by-day summaries.

== Day 1 (28 May) ==
- Schedule of play
- Seeds out:
  - Men's singles: (Luxembourg) Gilles Müller [26]
  - Women's singles: (Germany) Angelique Kerber [1], (Croatia) Mirjana Lučić-Baroni [22], (Italy) Roberta Vinci [31]

Matches on main courts
Matches on Court Philippe Chatrier (Center Court)
Event	Winner	Loser	Score
Women's singles - 1st round	(Czech Republic) Petra Kvitová [15]	(United States) Julia Boserup	6–3, 6–2
Women's singles - 1st round	(Russia) Ekaterina Makarova	(Germany) Angelique Kerber [1]	6–2, 6–2
Men's singles - 1st round	(Bulgaria) Grigor Dimitrov [11]	(France) Stéphane Robert	6–2, 6–3, 6–4
Men's singles - 1st round	(France) Lucas Pouille [16]	(France) Julien Benneteau [WC]	7–6^{(8–6)}, 3–6, 4–6, 6–3, 6–4
Matches on Court Suzanne Lenglen (Grandstand)
Event	Winner	Loser	Score
Men's singles - 1st round	(Argentina) Horacio Zeballos	(France) Adrian Mannarino	7–5, 6–3, 6–4
Women's singles - 1st round	(Russia) Svetlana Kuznetsova [8]	(United States) Christina McHale	7–5, 6–4
Men's singles - 1st round	(Austria) Dominic Thiem [6]	(Australia) Bernard Tomic	6–4, 6–0, 6–2
Women's singles - 1st round	(United States) Venus Williams [10]	(China) Wang Qiang	6–4, 7–6^{(7–3)}
Women's singles - 1st round	(Slovakia) Dominika Cibulková [6]	(Spain) Lara Arruabarrena	6–2, 6–1
Matches on Court 1
Event	Winner	Loser	Score
Men's singles - 1st round	(Spain) Guillermo García López	(Luxembourg) Gilles Müller [26]	7–6^{(7–4)}, 6–7^{(2–7)}, 6–2, 6–2
Men's singles - 1st round	(Argentina) Marco Trungelliti [Q]	(France) Quentin Halys [WC]	3–6, 6–7^{(4–7)}, 7–6^{(7–2)}, 6–4, 6–4
Women's singles - 1st round	(France) Océane Dodin	(Italy) Camila Giorgi	6–3, 6–2

== Day 2 (29 May) ==
- Schedule of play
- Seeds out:
  - Men's singles: (United States) Jack Sock [14], (France) Gilles Simon [31], (Germany) Mischa Zverev [32]
  - Women's singles: (United States) CoCo Vandeweghe [19], (Australia) Daria Gavrilova [24], (United States) Lauren Davis [25]

Matches on main courts
Matches on Court Philippe Chatrier (Center Court)
Event	Winner	Loser	Score
Women's singles - 1st round	(Spain) Garbiñe Muguruza [4]	(Italy) Francesca Schiavone	6–2, 6–4
Men's singles - 1st round	(Serbia) Novak Djokovic [2]	(Spain) Marcel Granollers	6–3, 6–4, 6–2
Women's singles - 1st round	(France) Kristina Mladenovic [13]	(United States) Jennifer Brady	3–6, 6–3, 9–7
Men's singles - 1st round	(Germany) Alexander Zverev [9] vs. (Spain) Fernando Verdasco		4–6, 6–3 suspended
Matches on Court Suzanne Lenglen (Grandstand)
Event	Winner	Loser	Score
Women's singles - 1st round	(Denmark) Caroline Wozniacki [11]	(Australia) Jaimee Fourlis [WC]	6–4, 3–6, 6–2
Men's singles - 1st round	(Spain) Rafael Nadal [4]	(France) Benoît Paire	6–1, 6–4, 6–1
Women's singles - 1st round	(Czech Republic) Karolína Plíšková [2]	(China) Zheng Saisai	7–5, 6–2
Men's singles - 1st round	(France) Richard Gasquet [24]	(Belgium) Arthur De Greef [Q]	6–2, 3–6, 6–1, 6–3
Matches on Court 1
Event	Winner	Loser	Score
Men's singles - 1st round	(Georgia (country)) Nikoloz Basilashvili	(France) Gilles Simon [31]	1–6, 6–2, 6–4, 6–1
Men's singles - 1st round	(Belgium) David Goffin [10]	(France) Paul-Henri Mathieu [Q]	6–2, 6–2, 6–2
Women's singles - 1st round	(Australia) Samantha Stosur [23]	(Slovakia) Kristína Kučová	7–5, 6–1
Women's singles - 1st round	(France) Pauline Parmentier	(Russia) Irina Khromacheva	6–3, 6–0

== Day 3 (30 May) ==
- Schedule of play
- Seeds out:
  - Men's singles: (Germany) Alexander Zverev [9], (United States) Sam Querrey [27]
  - Women's singles: (United Kingdom) Johanna Konta [7]
  - Men's doubles: (Finland) Henri Kontinen / (Australia) John Peers [1], (Spain) Feliciano López / (Spain) Marc López [6], (France) Fabrice Martin / (Canada) Daniel Nestor [14]

Matches on main courts
Matches on Court Philippe Chatrier (Center Court)
Event	Winner	Loser	Score
Women's singles - 1st round	(Chinese Taipei) Hsieh Su-wei	(United Kingdom) Johanna Konta [7]	1–6, 7–6^{(7–2)}, 6–4
Men's singles - 1st round	(Spain) Fernando Verdasco	(Germany) Alexander Zverev [9]	6–4, 3–6, 6–4, 6–2
Men's singles - 1st round	(United Kingdom) Andy Murray [1]	(Russia) Andrey Kuznetsov	6–4, 4–6, 6–2, 6–0
Men's singles - 1st round	(France) Jo-Wilfried Tsonga [12] vs. (Argentina) Renzo Olivo		5–7, 4–6, 7–6^{(8–6)}, 4–5 suspended
Matches on Court Suzanne Lenglen (Grandstand)
Event	Winner	Loser	Score
Women's singles - 1st round	(Ukraine) Elina Svitolina [5]	(Kazakhstan) Yaroslava Shvedova	6–4, 6–3
Men's singles - 1st round	(Switzerland) Stan Wawrinka [3]	(Slovakia) Jozef Kovalík [Q]	6–2, 7–6^{(8–6)}, 6–3
Women's singles - 1st round	(France) Caroline Garcia [28]	(Japan) Nao Hibino	6–2, 6–2
Men's singles - 1st round	(France) Gaël Monfils [15]	(Germany) Dustin Brown	6–4, 7–5, 6–0
Women's singles - 1st round	(Romania) Simona Halep [3]	(Slovakia) Jana Čepelová	6–2, 6–3
Matches on Court 1
Event	Winner	Loser	Score
Women's singles - 1st round	(France) Alizé Cornet	(Hungary) Tímea Babos	6–2, 6–7^{(5–7)}, 6–2
Men's singles - 1st round	(Japan) Kei Nishikori [8]	(Australia) Thanasi Kokkinakis [PR]	4–6, 6–1, 6–4, 6–4
Men's singles - 1st round	(Czech Republic) Tomáš Berdych [13]	(Germany) Jan-Lennard Struff	6–1, 6–1, 4–6, 6–4

== Day 4 (31 May) ==
Ons Jabeur of Tunisia became the first Arab woman to reach the third round of Grand Slam upsetting Dominika Cibulková in straight sets.

- Schedule of play
- Seeds out:
  - Men's singles: (France) Jo-Wilfried Tsonga [12], (Croatia) Ivo Karlović [23]
  - Women's singles: (Slovakia) Dominika Cibulková [6], (Czech Republic) Petra Kvitová [15], (Netherlands) Kiki Bertens [18]
  - Men's doubles: (France) Pierre-Hugues Herbert / (France) Nicolas Mahut [2], (Romania) Florin Mergea / (Pakistan) Aisam-ul-Haq Qureshi [13]
  - Women's doubles: (India) Sania Mirza / (Kazakhstan) Yaroslava Shvedova [4], (Germany) Anna-Lena Grönefeld / (Czech Republic) Květa Peschke [11]
  - Mixed doubles: (Chinese Taipei) Chan Yung-jan / (Australia) John Peers [1]

Matches on main courts
Matches on Court Philippe Chatrier (Center Court)
Event	Winner	Loser	Score
Women's singles - 2nd round	(United States) Venus Williams [10]	(Japan) Kurumi Nara	6–3, 6–1
Men's singles - 1st round	(Argentina) Renzo Olivo	(France) Jo-Wilfried Tsonga [12]	7–5, 6–4, 6–7^{(6–8)}, 6–4
Women's singles - 2nd round	(Spain) Garbiñe Muguruza [4]	(Estonia) Anett Kontaveit	6–7^{(4–7)}, 6–4, 6–2
Men's singles - 2nd round	(Spain) Rafael Nadal [4]	(Netherlands) Robin Haase	6–1, 6–4, 6–3
Men's singles - 2nd round	(France) Lucas Pouille [16]	(Brazil) Thomaz Bellucci	7–6^{(7–5)}, 6–1, 6–2
Matches on Court Suzanne Lenglen (Grandstand)
Event	Winner	Loser	Score
Men's singles - 2nd round	(Austria) Dominic Thiem [6]	(Italy) Simone Bolelli [Q]	7–5, 6–1, 6–3
Men's singles - 2nd round	(Serbia) Novak Djokovic [2]	(Portugal) João Sousa	6–1, 6–4, 6–3
Women's singles - 2nd round	(France) Kristina Mladenovic [13]	(Italy) Sara Errani [Q]	6–2, 6–3
Women's singles - 2nd round	(Tunisia) Ons Jabeur [LL]	(Slovakia) Dominika Cibulková [6]	6–4, 6–3
Matches on Court 1
Event	Winner	Loser	Score
Women's singles - 2nd round	(United States) Bethanie Mattek-Sands [Q]	(Czech Republic) Petra Kvitová [15]	7–6^{(7–5)}, 7–6^{(7–5)}
Men's singles - 2nd round	(Bulgaria) Grigor Dimitrov [11]	(Spain) Tommy Robredo [PR]	6–3, 6–4, 7–5
Men's singles - 2nd round	(Canada) Milos Raonic [5]	(Brazil) Rogério Dutra Silva	4–6, 6–2, 6–3, 6–4
Women's singles - 2nd round	(Russia) Svetlana Kuznetsova [8]	(France) Océane Dodin	7–6^{(7–5)}, 5–7, 6–3

== Day 5 (1 June) ==
- Schedule of play
- Seeds out:
  - Men's singles: (Czech Republic) Tomáš Berdych [13], (Australia) Nick Kyrgios [18], (Spain) David Ferrer [30]
  - Women's singles: (United States) Madison Keys [12], (Russia) Anastasia Pavlyuchenkova [16], (Czech Republic) Barbora Strýcová [20], (Croatia) Ana Konjuh [29]
  - Men's doubles: (South Africa) Raven Klaasen / (United States) Rajeev Ram [8], (Spain) Pablo Carreño Busta / (Spain) Guillermo García López [10], (Poland) Marcin Matkowski / (France) Édouard Roger-Vasselin [12], (Austria) Oliver Marach / (Croatia) Mate Pavić [15]
  - Women's doubles: (United States) Raquel Atawo / (Latvia) Jeļena Ostapenko [10]

Matches on main courts
Matches on Court Philippe Chatrier (Center Court)
Event	Winner	Loser	Score
Women's singles - 2nd round	(France) Alizé Cornet	(Czech Republic) Barbora Strýcová [20]	6–4, 6–1
Men's singles - 2nd round	(Switzerland) Stan Wawrinka [3]	(Ukraine) Alexandr Dolgopolov	6–4, 7–6^{(7–5)}, 7–5
Men's singles - 2nd round	(France) Gaël Monfils [15]	(Brazil) Thiago Monteiro	6–1, 6–4, 6–1
Women's singles - 2nd round	(Czech Republic) Karolína Plíšková [2]	(Russia) Ekaterina Alexandrova	6–2, 4–6, 6–3
Matches on Court Suzanne Lenglen (Grandstand)
Event	Winner	Loser	Score
Women's singles - 2nd round	(Poland) Agnieszka Radwańska [9]	(Belgium) Alison Van Uytvanck [Q]	6–7^{(3–7)}, 6–2, 6–3
Men's singles - 2nd round	(United Kingdom) Andy Murray [1]	(Slovakia) Martin Kližan	6–7^{(3–7)}, 6–2, 6–2, 7–6^{(7–3)}
Women's singles - 2nd round	(Romania) Simona Halep [3]	(Germany) Tatjana Maria	6–4, 6–3
Men's singles - 2nd round	(France) Richard Gasquet [24]	(Dominican Republic) Víctor Estrella Burgos	6–1, 6–0, 6–4
Matches on Court 1
Event	Winner	Loser	Score
Men's singles - 2nd round	(Croatia) Marin Čilić [7]	(Russia) Konstantin Kravchuk	6–3, 6–2, 6–2
Men's singles - 2nd round	(Japan) Kei Nishikori [8]	(France) Jérémy Chardy	6–3, 6–0, 7–6^{(7–5)}
Women's singles - 2nd round	(France) Caroline Garcia [28]	(France) Chloé Paquet [WC]	7–5, 6–4
Women's singles - 2nd round	(Germany) Carina Witthöft	(France) Pauline Parmentier	6–4, 7–6^{(7–5)}
Women's singles - 2nd round	(Croatia) Petra Martić [Q]	(United States) Madison Keys [12]	3–6, 6–3, 6–1

== Day 6 (2 June) ==
- Schedule of play
- Seeds out:
  - Men's singles: (Belgium) David Goffin [10], (Bulgaria) Grigor Dimitrov [11], (France) Lucas Pouille [16], (United States) Steve Johnson [25]
  - Women's singles: (Kazakhstan) Yulia Putintseva [27], (China) Zhang Shuai [32]
  - Men's doubles: (United States) Bob Bryan / (United States) Mike Bryan [3], (Poland) Łukasz Kubot / (Brazil) Marcelo Melo [4]
  - Women's doubles: (Hungary) Tímea Babos / (Czech Republic) Andrea Hlaváčková [5], (Croatia) Darija Jurak / (Australia) Anastasia Rodionova [17]
  - Mixed doubles: (Latvia) Jeļena Ostapenko / (Brazil) Bruno Soares [8]

Matches on main courts
Matches on Court Philippe Chatrier (Center Court)
Event	Winner	Loser	Score
Women's singles - 3rd round	(Spain) Garbiñe Muguruza [4]	(Kazakhstan) Yulia Putintseva [27]	7–5, 6–2
Men's singles - 3rd round	(Spain) Rafael Nadal [4]	(Georgia (country)) Nikoloz Basilashvili	6–0, 6–1, 6–0
Men's singles - 3rd round	(Serbia) Novak Djokovic [2]	(Argentina) Diego Schwartzman	5–7, 6–3, 3–6, 6–1, 6–1
Women's singles - 3rd round	(United States) Venus Williams [10]	(Belgium) Elise Mertens	6–3, 6–1
Matches on Court Suzanne Lenglen (Grandstand)
Event	Winner	Loser	Score
Men's singles - 3rd round	(Argentina) Horacio Zeballos	(Belgium) David Goffin [10]	4–5, retired
Women's singles - 3rd round	(France) Kristina Mladenovic [13]	(United States) Shelby Rogers	7–5, 4–6, 8–6
Men's singles - 3rd round	(Spain) Albert Ramos Viñolas [19]	(France) Lucas Pouille [16]	6–2, 3–6, 5–7, 6–2, 6–1
Matches on Court 1
Event	Winner	Loser	Score
Men's singles - 3rd round	(Spain) Pablo Carreño Busta [20]	(Bulgaria) Grigor Dimitrov [11]	7–5, 6–3, 6–4
Men's singles - 3rd round	(Austria) Dominic Thiem [6]	(United States) Steve Johnson [25]	6–1, 7–6^{(7–4)}, 6–3
Women's singles - 3rd round	(Russia) Svetlana Kuznetsova [8]	(China) Zhang Shuai [32]	7–6^{(7–5)}, 4–6, 7–5

== Day 7 (3 June) ==
- Schedule of play
- Seeds out:
  - Men's singles: (Uruguay) Pablo Cuevas [22], (Italy) Fabio Fognini [28], (Argentina) Juan Martín del Potro [29]
  - Women's singles: (Poland) Agnieszka Radwańska [9], (Russia) Elena Vesnina [14], (Russia) Daria Kasatkina [26]
  - Men's doubles: (Netherlands) Jean-Julien Rojer / (Romania) Horia Tecău [11]
  - Women's doubles: (United States) Abigail Spears / (Slovenia) Katarina Srebotnik [8], (Japan) Eri Hozumi / (Japan) Miyu Kato [18]
  - Mixed doubles: (Kazakhstan) Yaroslava Shvedova / (Austria) Alexander Peya [5]

Matches on main courts
Matches on Court Philippe Chatrier (Center Court)
Event	Winner	Loser	Score
Women's singles - 3rd round	(France) Alizé Cornet	(Poland) Agnieszka Radwańska [9]	6–2, 6–1
Men's singles - 3rd round	(United Kingdom) Andy Murray [1]	(Argentina) Juan Martín del Potro [29]	7–6^{(10–8)}, 7–5, 6–0
Men's singles - 3rd round	(France) Richard Gasquet [29] vs. (France) Gaël Monfils [15]		5–6 suspended
Matches on Court Suzanne Lenglen (Grandstand)
Event	Winner	Loser	Score
Men's singles - 3rd round	(Croatia) Marin Čilić [7]	(Spain) Feliciano López	6–1, 6–3, 6–3
Women's singles - 3rd round	(Romania) Simona Halep [3]	(Russia) Daria Kasatkina [26]	6–0, 7–5
Men's singles - 3rd round	(Switzerland) Stan Wawrinka [3]	(Italy) Fabio Fognini [28]	7–6^{(7–2)}, 6–0, 6–2
Matches on Court 1
Event	Winner	Loser	Score
Women's singles - 3rd round	(France) Caroline Garcia [28]	(Chinese Taipei) Hsieh Su-wei	6–4, 4–6, 9–7
Men's singles - 3rd round	(South Korea) Chung Hyeon vs. (Japan) Kei Nishikori [8]		5–7, 4–6, 7–6^{(7–4)}, 3–0 suspended

== Day 8 (4 June) ==
Defending champion Garbiñe Muguruza lost to Kristina Mladenovic in the fourth round, ending her 10-match winning streak in Roland Garros. Former major champions Samantha Stosur, Svetlana Kuznetsova and Venus Williams were also eliminated in the fourth round.

- Schedule of play
- Seeds out:
  - Men's singles: (Canada) Milos Raonic [5], (Spain) Roberto Bautista Agut [17], (Spain) Albert Ramos Viñolas [19], (United States) John Isner [21], (France) Richard Gasquet [24]
  - Women's singles: (Spain) Garbiñe Muguruza [4], (Russia) Svetlana Kuznetsova [8], (United States) Venus Williams [10], (Latvia) Anastasija Sevastova [17], (Australia) Samantha Stosur [23]
  - Men's doubles: (India) Rohan Bopanna / (Uruguay) Pablo Cuevas [9]
  - Women's doubles: (Canada) Gabriela Dabrowski / (China) Xu Yifan [9], (Netherlands) Kiki Bertens / (Sweden) Johanna Larsson [13]
  - Mixed doubles: (Slovenia) Katarina Srebotnik / (South Africa) Raven Klaasen [4], (Chinese Taipei) Chan Hao-ching / (Netherlands) Jean-Julien Rojer [6]

Matches on main courts
Matches on Court Philippe Chatrier (Center Court)
Event	Winner	Loser	Score
Women's singles - 4th round	(Denmark) Caroline Wozniacki [11]	(Russia) Svetlana Kuznetsova [8]	6–1, 4–6, 6–2
Men's singles - 3rd round	(France) Gaël Monfils [15]	(France) Richard Gasquet [24]	7–6^{(7–5)}, 5–7, 4–3, retired
Women's singles - 4th round	(Switzerland) Timea Bacsinszky [30]	(United States) Venus Williams [10]	5–7, 6–2, 6–1
Men's singles - 4th round	(Serbia) Novak Djokovic [2]	(Spain) Albert Ramos Viñolas [19]	7–6^{(7–5)}, 6–1, 6–3
Matches on Court Suzanne Lenglen (Grandstand)
Event	Winner	Loser	Score
Women's singles - 3rd round	(Ukraine) Elina Svitolina [5]	(Poland) Magda Linette	6–4, 7–5
Men's singles - 4th round	(Spain) Rafael Nadal [4]	(Spain) Roberto Bautista Agut [17]	6–1, 6–2, 6–2
Women's singles - 4th round	(France) Kristina Mladenovic [13]	(Spain) Garbiñe Muguruza [4]	6–1, 3–6, 6–3
Men's singles - 4th round	(Austria) Dominic Thiem [6]	(Argentina) Horacio Zeballos	6–1, 6–3, 6–1
Matches on Court 1
Event	Winner	Loser	Score
Men's singles - 3rd round	(Japan) Kei Nishikori [8]	(South Korea) Chung Hyeon	7–5, 6–4, 6–7^{(4–7)}, 0–6, 6–4
Men's singles - 4th round	(Spain) Pablo Carreño Busta [20]	(Canada) Milos Raonic [5]	4–6, 7–6^{(7–2)}, 6–7^{(6–8)}, 6–4, 8–6
Women's doubles - 3rd round	(Romania) Raluca Olaru (Ukraine) Olga Savchuk	(Canada) Gabriela Dabrowski [9] (China) Xu Yifan [9]	6–3, 3–6, 6–2
Mixed doubles - 2nd round	(Czech Republic) Andrea Hlaváčková [3] (France) Édouard Roger-Vasselin [3]	(France) Pauline Parmentier [WC] (France) Mathias Bourgue [WC]	6–2, 6–4

== Day 9 (5 June) ==
- Schedule of play
- Seeds out:
  - Men's singles: (France) Gaël Monfils [15]
  - Women's singles: (Spain) Carla Suárez Navarro [21]
  - Men's doubles: (United Kingdom) Jamie Murray / (Brazil) Bruno Soares [5]
  - Women's doubles: (Chinese Taipei) Chan Hao-ching / (Czech Republic) Barbora Krejčíková [12], (Russia) Svetlana Kuznetsova / (France) Kristina Mladenovic [14], (Slovenia) Andreja Klepač / (Spain) María José Martínez Sánchez [15]
  - Mixed doubles: (India) Sania Mirza / (Croatia) Ivan Dodig [2]

Matches on main courts
Matches on Court Philippe Chatrier (Center Court)
Event	Winner	Loser	Score
Women's singles - 4th round	(Romania) Simona Halep [3]	(Spain) Carla Suárez Navarro [21]	6–1, 6–1
Men's singles - 4th round	(United Kingdom) Andy Murray [1]	(Russia) Karen Khachanov	6–3, 6–4, 6–4
Men's singles - 4th round	(Switzerland) Stan Wawrinka [3]	(France) Gaël Monfils [15]	7–5, 7–6^{(9–7)}, 6–2
Women's singles - 4th round	(France) Caroline Garcia [28]	(France) Alizé Cornet	6–2, 6–4
Matches on Court Suzanne Lenglen (Grandstand)
Event	Winner	Loser	Score
Women's singles - 4th round	(Ukraine) Elina Svitolina [5]	(Croatia) Petra Martić [Q]	4–6, 6–3, 7–5
Men's singles - 4th round	(Japan) Kei Nishikori [8]	(Spain) Fernando Verdasco	0–6, 6–4, 6–4, 6–0
Men's singles - 4th round	(Croatia) Marin Čilić [7]	(South Africa) Kevin Anderson	6–3, 3–0, retired
Women's singles - 4th round	(Czech Republic) Karolína Plíšková [2]	(Paraguay) Verónica Cepede Royg	2–6, 6–3, 6–4
Matches on Court 1
Event	Winner	Loser	Score
Women's doubles - 3rd round	(Australia) Ashleigh Barty (Australia) Casey Dellacqua	(Australia) Daria Gavrilova (Russia) Anastasia Pavlyuchenkova	7–6^{(7–2)}, 6–4
Women's doubles - 3rd round	(Russia) Ekaterina Makarova [2] (Russia) Elena Vesnina [2]	(Slovenia) Andreja Klepač [15] (Spain) María José Martínez Sánchez [15]	3–6, 6–3, 6–2
Women's doubles - 3rd round	(United States) Bethanie Mattek-Sands [1] (Czech Republic) Lucie Šafářová [1]	(Russia) Svetlana Kuznetsova [14] (France) Kristina Mladenovic [14]	6–4, 6–2
Men's doubles - Quarterfinals	(Mexico) Santiago González (United States) Donald Young	(United Kingdom) Jamie Murray [5] (Brazil) Bruno Soares [5]	3–6, 7–6^{(7–3)}, 7–6^{(7–4)}

== Day 10 (6 June) ==
Play normally started at 14:00 CEST, match suspended at 15:30 due to heavy rain and resumed at 18:30.

- Schedule of play
- Seeds out:
  - Women's singles: (Denmark) Caroline Wozniacki [11], (France) Kristina Mladenovic [13]
  - Men's doubles: (Croatia) Ivan Dodig / (Spain) Marcel Granollers [7]

Matches on main courts
Matches on Court Philippe Chatrier (Center Court)
Event	Winner	Loser	Score
Women's singles - Quarterfinals	(Switzerland) Timea Bacsinszky [30]	(France) Kristina Mladenovic [13]	6–4, 6–4
Matches on Court Suzanne Lenglen (Grandstand)
Event	Winner	Loser	Score
Women's singles - Quarterfinals	(Latvia) Jeļena Ostapenko	(Denmark) Caroline Wozniacki [11]	4–6, 6–2, 6–2
Matches on Court 1
Event	Winner	Loser	Score
Legends Over 45 Doubles	(Spain) Sergi Bruguera (Croatia) Goran Ivanišević	(Australia) Pat Cash (United States) Michael Chang	7–6^{(7–2)}, 2–6, [10–4]
Mixed doubles - Quarterfinals	(Czech Republic) Andrea Hlaváčková [3] (France) Édouard Roger-Vasselin [3]	(Slovenia) Andreja Klepač (United Kingdom) Dominic Inglot	7–6^{(7–3)}, 6–3
Men's doubles - Quarterfinals	(United States) Ryan Harrison (New Zealand) Michael Venus	(Croatia) Ivan Dodig [7] (Spain) Marcel Granollers [7]	6–2, 3–6, 6–3

== Day 11 (7 June) ==
- Schedule of play
- Seeds out:
  - Men's singles: (Serbia) Novak Djokovic [2], (Croatia) Marin Čilić [7], (Japan) Kei Nishikori [8], (Spain) Pablo Carreño Busta [20]
  - Women's singles: (Ukraine) Elina Svitolina [5], (France) Caroline Garcia [28]
  - Women's doubles: (Russia) Ekaterina Makarova / (Russia) Elena Vesnina [2]
  - Mixed doubles: (Czech Republic) Andrea Hlaváčková / (France) Édouard Roger-Vasselin [3]

Matches on main courts
Matches on Court Philippe Chatrier (Center Court)
Event	Winner	Loser	Score
Men's singles - Quarterfinals	(Spain) Rafael Nadal [4]	(Spain) Pablo Carreño Busta [20]	6–2, 2–0, retired
Women's singles - Quarterfinals	(Czech Republic) Karolína Plíšková [2]	(France) Caroline Garcia [28]	7–6^{(7–3)}, 6–4
Men's singles - Quarterfinals	(United Kingdom) Andy Murray [1]	(Japan) Kei Nishikori [8]	2–6, 6–1, 7–6^{(7–0)}, 6–1
Matches on Court Suzanne Lenglen (Grandstand)
Event	Winner	Loser	Score
Men's singles - Quarterfinals	(Austria) Dominic Thiem [6]	(Serbia) Novak Djokovic [2]	7–6^{(7–5)}, 6–3, 6–0
Women's singles - Quarterfinals	(Romania) Simona Halep [3]	(Ukraine) Elina Svitolina [5]	3–6, 7–6^{(8–6)}, 6–0
Men's singles - Quarterfinals	(Switzerland) Stan Wawrinka [3]	(Croatia) Marin Čilić [7]	6–3, 6–3, 6–1
Matches on Court 1
Event	Winner	Loser	Score
Men's doubles - Quarterfinals	(Spain) Fernando Verdasco (Serbia) Nenad Zimonjić	(Brazil) Rogério Dutra Silva (Italy) Paolo Lorenzi	7–6^{(7–5)}, 7–5
Women's doubles - Quarterfinals	(United States) Bethanie Mattek-Sands [1] (Czech Republic) Lucie Šafářová [1]	(Belgium) Kirsten Flipkens (Italy) Francesca Schiavone	6–2, 6–4
Mixed doubles - Semifinals	(Canada) Gabriela Dabrowski [7] (India) Rohan Bopanna [7]	(Czech Republic) Andrea Hlaváčková [3] (France) Édouard Roger-Vasselin [3]	7–5, 6–3
Women's doubles - Quarterfinals	(Chinese Taipei) Chan Yung-jan [3] (Switzerland) Martina Hingis [3]	(Romania) Raluca Olaru (Ukraine) Olga Savchuk	6–2, 6–1

== Day 12 (8 June) ==
- Schedule of play
- Seeds out:
  - Women's singles: (Czech Republic) Karolína Plíšková [2], (Switzerland) Timea Bacsinszky [30]

Matches on main courts
Matches on Court Philippe Chatrier (Center Court)
Event	Winner	Loser	Score
Mixed doubles - Final	(Canada) Gabriela Dabrowski [7] (India) Rohan Bopanna [7]	(Germany) Anna-Lena Grönefeld (Colombia) Robert Farah	2–6, 6–2, [12–10]
Women's singles - Semifinals	(Latvia) Jeļena Ostapenko	(Switzerland) Timea Bacsinszky [30]	7–6^{(7–4)}, 3–6, 6–3
Women's singles - Semifinals	(Romania) Simona Halep [3]	(Czech Republic) Karolína Plíšková [2]	6–4, 3–6, 6–3
Matches on Court Suzanne Lenglen (Grandstand)
Event	Winner	Loser	Score
Women's Legends	(France) Marion Bartoli (Croatia) Iva Majoli	(Spain) Conchita Martínez (United States) Chanda Rubin	7–6^{(7–5)}, 6–4
Legends Under 45 Doubles	(France) Sébastien Grosjean (France) Michaël Llodra	(Spain) Àlex Corretja (Argentina) Gastón Gaudio	6–2, 2–6, [10–7]
Men's doubles - Semifinals	(Mexico) Santiago González (United States) Donald Young	(Spain) Fernando Verdasco (Serbia) Nenad Zimonjić	6–7^{(3–7)}, 7–5, 6–3
Legends Over 45 Doubles	(France) Mansour Bahrami (France) Fabrice Santoro	(Sweden) Mikael Pernfors (Australia) Mark Woodforde	6–3, 6–4
Matches on Court 1
Event	Winner	Loser	Score
Legends Over 45 Doubles	(Sweden) Mikael Pernfors (Australia) Mark Woodforde	(France) Arnaud Boetsch (France) Henri Leconte	6–2, 6–4
Women's Legends	(Russia) Anastasia Myskina (France) Nathalie Tauziat	(Spain) Arantxa Sánchez Vicario (France) Sandrine Testud	2–6, 6–3, [10–6]

== Day 13 (9 June) ==
- Schedule of play
- Seeds out:
  - Men's singles: (United Kingdom) Andy Murray [1], (Austria) Dominic Thiem [6]
  - Men's doubles: (Colombia) Juan Sebastián Cabal / (Colombia) Robert Farah [16]
  - Women's doubles: (Chinese Taipei) Chan Yung-jan / (Switzerland) Martina Hingis [3], (Czech Republic) Lucie Hradecká / (Czech Republic) Kateřina Siniaková [6]

Matches on main courts
Matches on Court Philippe Chatrier (Center Court)
Event	Winner	Loser	Score
Men's singles - Semifinals	(Switzerland) Stan Wawrinka [3]	(United Kingdom) Andy Murray [1]	6–7^{(6–8)}, 6–3, 5–7, 7–6^{(7–3)}, 6–1
Men's singles - Semifinals	(Spain) Rafael Nadal [4]	(Austria) Dominic Thiem [6]	6–3, 6–4, 6–0
Matches on Court Suzanne Lenglen (Grandstand)
Event	Winner	Loser	Score
Legends Over 45 Doubles	(Australia) Pat Cash (United States) Michael Chang	(United States) John McEnroe (France) Cédric Pioline	6–4, 6–3
Men's doubles - Semifinals	(United States) Ryan Harrison (New Zealand) Michael Venus	(Colombia) Juan Sebastián Cabal [16] (Colombia) Robert Farah [16]	4–6, 6–3, 6–4
Women's doubles - Semifinals	(Australia) Ashleigh Barty (Australia) Casey Dellacqua	(Czech Republic) Lucie Hradecká [6] (Czech Republic) Kateřina Siniaková [6]	7–5, 4–6, 6–3
Women's doubles - Semifinals	(United States) Bethanie Mattek-Sands [1] (Czech Republic) Lucie Šafářová [1]	(Chinese Taipei) Chan Yung-jan [3] (Switzerland) Martina Hingis [3]	6–4, 6–2
Matches on Court 1
Event	Winner	Loser	Score
Women's Legends	(United States) Lindsay Davenport (United States) Martina Navratilova	(Russia) Anastasia Myskina (France) Nathalie Tauziat	5–7, 6–0, [10–4]
Women's Legends	(United States) Tracy Austin (Belgium) Kim Clijsters	(Spain) Conchita Martínez (United States) Chanda Rubin	4–1, retired

== Day 14 (10 June) ==
Jeļena Ostapenko became the first Latvian player (male or female) to win a major title and the first unseeded female player since Margaret Scriven in 1933. She also claimed her first ever WTA title by winning the tournament.

- Schedule of play
- Seeds out:
  - Women's singles: (Romania) Simona Halep [3]

Matches on main courts
Matches on Court Philippe Chatrier (Center Court)
Event	Winner	Loser	Score
Women's singles - Final	(Latvia) Jeļena Ostapenko	(Romania) Simona Halep [3]	4–6, 6–4, 6–3
Men's doubles - Final	(United States) Ryan Harrison (New Zealand) Michael Venus	(Mexico) Santiago González (United States) Donald Young	7–6^{(7–5)}, 6–7^{(4–7)}, 6–3
Matches on Court Suzanne Lenglen (Grandstand)
Event	Winner	Loser	Score
Women's Legends	(United States) Tracy Austin (Belgium) Kim Clijsters	(United States) Lindsay Davenport (United States) Martina Navratilova	6–3, 3–6, [10–5]
Legends Under 45 Doubles	(France) Arnaud Clément (France) Nicolas Escudé	(Sweden) Thomas Enqvist (Sweden) Magnus Norman	6–4, 7–6^{(7–4)}

== Day 15 (11 June) ==
Rafael Nadal became the first male player to win 10 major singles titles in a single Grand Slam event, equally tying Björn Borg's overall men's Grand Slam record without losing a set. He surpassed Pete Sampras' 14 major titles, now second behind Roger Federer.

- Schedule of play
- Seeds out:
  - Men's singles: (Switzerland) Stan Wawrinka [3]

Matches on main courts
Matches on Court Philippe Chatrier (Center Court)
Event	Winner	Loser	Score
Women's doubles - Final	(United States) Bethanie Mattek-Sands [1] (Czech Republic) Lucie Šafářová [1]	(Australia) Ashleigh Barty (Australia) Casey Dellacqua	6–2, 6–1
Men's singles - Final	(Spain) Rafael Nadal [4]	(Switzerland) Stan Wawrinka [3]	6–2, 6–3, 6–1
Matches on Court Suzanne Lenglen (Grandstand)
Event	Winner	Loser	Score
Legends Under 45 Doubles	(France) Sébastien Grosjean (France) Michaël Llodra	(Netherlands) Paul Haarhuis (Ukraine) Andriy Medvedev	6–4, 3–6, [10–8]
Legends Over 45 Doubles	(France) Mansour Bahrami (France) Fabrice Santoro	(Australia) Pat Cash (United States) Michael Chang	7–6^{(7–3)}, 6–3
