= 2017 French Open – Boys' singles =

Boys' singles
- 2017 French Open

Final
- Champion: (Australia) Alexei Popyrin
- Runner-up: (Spain) Nicola Kuhn
- Score: 7–6^{(7–5)}, 6–3

Events
Singles	men	women		boys	girls
Doubles	men	women	mixed	boys	girls
WC Singles	men	women	quad
WC Doubles	men	women	quad
Legends	−45	45+	women
- French Open

Alexei Popyrin won the title, defeating Nicola Kuhn in the final, 7–6^{(7–5)}, 6–3.

Geoffrey Blancaneaux was the defending champion, but was no longer eligible to participate in junior events. He received a wildcard into the men's singles qualifying competition, where he lost to fellow wildcard Maxime Janvier in the first round.

== Seeds ==
1. (Serbia) Miomir Kecmanović (semifinals)
2. (France) Corentin Moutet (second round)
3. (Australia) Alexei Popyrin (champion)
4. (Hungary) Zsombor Piros (third round)
5. (Chinese Taipei) Hsu Yu-hsiou (first round)
6. (Serbia) Marko Miladinović (first round)
7. (Israel) Yshai Oliel (second round)
8. (United States) Trent Bryde (second round)
9. (Japan) Yuta Shimizu (second round)
10. (United States) Oliver Crawford (third round)
11. (Spain) Nicola Kuhn (final)
12. (Austria) Jurij Rodionov (third round)
13. (Argentina) Sebastián Báez (first round)
14. (Germany) Rudolf Molleker (first round)
15. (Argentina) Juan Pablo Grassi Mazzuchi (first round)
16. (Portugal) Duarte Vale (third round)

== Draw ==
Key

- Q = Qualifier
- WC = Wild card
- LL = Lucky loser
- Alt = Alternate
- ITF = ITF entry
- PR = Protected ranking
- SR = Special ranking
- SE = Special exempt
- JE = Junior exempt
- JR = Junior Accelerator Programme entrant
- CO = College Accelerator Programme entrant
- NG = Next Gen Accelerator Program entrant
- w/o = Walkover
- r = Retired
- d = Defaulted

=== Finals ===
Quarterfinals
1	(Serbia) Miomir Kecmanović	4	6	6
(Brazil) Thiago Seyboth Wild	6	3	4
(Australia) Blake Ellis	0	3
11	(Spain) Nicola Kuhn	6	6
(United States) Gianni Ross	6	1	5
3	(Australia) Alexei Popyrin	4	6	7
WC	(France) Clément Tabur	1	0
(Spain) Alejandro Davidovich Fokina	6	6

Semifinals
1	(Serbia) Miomir Kecmanović	6^{5}	6	6^{4}
11	(Spain) Nicola Kuhn	7^{7}	2	7^{7}
3	(Australia) Alexei Popyrin	6	6
(Spain) Alejandro Davidovich Fokina	4	2

Final
11	(Spain) Nicola Kuhn	6^{5}	3
3	(Australia) Alexei Popyrin	7^{7}	6

=== Top half ===
==== Section 1 ====
First round
1	(Serbia) Miomir Kecmanović	6	6
WC	(France) Jaimee Floyd Angele	3	1
(United States) Alafia Ayeni	2	2
(Tunisia) Mohamed Ali Bellalouna	6	6
(Czech Republic) Tomáš Macháč	3	6	4
(France) Constantin Bittoun Kouzmine	6	1	6
(United States) Patrick Kypson	2	6	3
16	(Portugal) Duarte Vale	6	0	6
12	(Austria) Jurij Rodionov	6	6
SE	(Russia) Nikolay Vylegzhanin	4	2
(United States) Sam Riffice	6^{4}	6	6
Q	(Argentina) Thiago Agustín Tirante	7^{7}	2	1
(Brazil) Thiago Seyboth Wild	3	6	6
WC	(France) Rayane Roumane	6	3	4
Q	(Belgium) Tibo Colson	6^{5}	1
7	(Israel) Yshai Oliel	7^{7}	6

Second round
1	(Serbia) M Kecmanović	6	6
(Tunisia) MA Bellalouna	2	1
(France) C Bittoun Kouzmine	7	5	3
16	(Portugal) D Vale	5	7	6
12	(Austria) J Rodionov	3	6	6
(United States) S Riffice	6	1	4
(Brazil) T Seyboth Wild	3	6	7
7	(Israel) Y Oliel	6	3	5

Third round
1	(Serbia) M Kecmanović	6	6
16	(Portugal) D Vale	1	4
12	(Austria) J Rodionov	6	6^{8}	4
(Brazil) T Seyboth Wild	3	7^{10}	6

Quarterfinals
1	(Serbia) M Kecmanović	4	6	6
(Brazil) T Seyboth Wild	6	3	4

==== Section 2 ====
First round
4	(Hungary) Zsombor Piros	4	6	6
WC	(France) Maxence Brovillé	6	2	4
(Republic of Ireland) Simon Carr	0	7^{7}	6
(United States) Vasil Kirkov	6	6^{4}	2
(Ukraine) Nikita Mashtakov	3	2
(Czech Republic) Michael Vrbenský	6	6
(Australia) Blake Ellis	6	6
13	(Argentina) Sebastián Báez	0	3
11	(Spain) Nicola Kuhn	7	6
(Germany) Marvin Möller	5	1
WC	(France) Louis Dussin	2	2
SE	(Japan) Naoki Tajima	6	6
(Russia) Artem Dubrivnyy	2	4
(Chinese Taipei) Tseng Chun-hsin	6	6
WC	(France) Hugo Gaston	4	6^{12}
8	(United States) Trent Bryde	6	7^{14}

Second round
4	(Hungary) Z Piros	6	6
(Republic of Ireland) S Carr	0	4
(Czech Republic) M Vrbenský	7^{8}	2	4
(Australia) B Ellis	6^{6}	6	6
11	(Spain) N Kuhn	6^{5}	6	6
SE	(Japan) N Tajima	7^{7}	2	4
(Chinese Taipei) C-h Tseng	6	6
8	(United States) T Bryde	4	2

Third round
4	(Hungary) Z Piros	6	1	2
(Australia) B Ellis	3	6	6
11	(Spain) N Kuhn	6	6
(Chinese Taipei) C-h Tseng	1	3

Quarterfinals
(Australia) B Ellis	0	3
11	(Spain) N Kuhn	6	6

=== Bottom half ===
==== Section 3 ====
First round
6	(Serbia) Marko Miladinović	3	7	1
(United States) Sebastian Korda	6	5	6
(France) Dan Added	6^{6}	2
Q	(South Korea) Park Ui-sung	7^{8}	6
Q	(Italy) Francesco Forti	1	4
(United States) Gianni Ross	6	6
Q	(Russia) Timofey Skatov	6	4	3
9	(Japan) Yuta Shimizu	3	6	6
15	(Argentina) Juan Pablo Grassi Mazzuchi	4	2
(France) Matteo Martineau	6	6
WC	(United States) Brian Cernoch	5
(Russia) Alen Avidzba	3^{r}
Q	(France) Valentin Royer	7	3	3
(Czech Republic) Ondřej Štyler	5	6	6
Q	(Chile) Matías Soto	1	3
3	(Australia) Alexei Popyrin	6	6

Second round
(United States) S Korda	6	7^{7}
Q	(South Korea) U-s Park	4	6^{4}
(United States) G Ross	0	6	6
9	(Japan) Y Shimizu	6	4	4
(France) M Martineau	7^{7}	3	7^{7}
WC	(United States) B Cernoch	6^{5}	6	6^{0}
(Czech Republic) O Štyler	7	5	2
3	(Australia) A Popyrin	5	7	6

Third round
(United States) S Korda	6	4	0
(United States) G Ross	2	6	6
(France) M Martineau	4	6	2
3	(Australia) A Popyrin	6	4	6

Quarterfinals
(United States) G Ross	6	1	5
3	(Australia) A Popyrin	4	6	7

==== Section 4 ====
First round
5	(Chinese Taipei) Hsu Yu-hsiou	1	4
(United States) Danny Thomas	6	6
WC	(India) Abhimanyu Vannemreddy	0	1
WC	(France) Clément Tabur	6	6
(Mexico) Alan Fernando Rubio Fierros	3	3
Q	(South Africa) Bertus Kruger	6	6
(Canada) Benjamin Sigouin	3	6	6^{5}
10	(United States) Oliver Crawford	6	4	7^{7}
14	(Germany) Rudolf Molleker	4	6^{4}
(Spain) Alejandro Davidovich Fokina	6	7^{7}
(Argentina) Axel Geller	4	4
(United States) Alexandre Rotsaert	6	6
(Russia) Alexey Zakharov	5	6	6
(Belgium) Zizou Bergs	7	3	2
(Finland) Emil Ruusuvuori	1	1
2	(France) Corentin Moutet	6	6

Second round
(United States) D Thomas	4	6^{3}
WC	(France) C Tabur	6	7^{7}
Q	(South Africa) B Kruger	6^{3}	4
10	(United States) O Crawford	7^{7}	6
(Spain) A Davidovich Fokina	6	4	6
(United States) A Rotsaert	2	6	1
(Russia) A Zakharov	7^{8}	0	6
2	(France) C Moutet	6^{6}	6	2

Third round
WC	(France) C Tabur	6	4	6
10	(United States) O Crawford	4	6	4
(Spain) A Davidovich Fokina	6	6
(Russia) A Zakharov	3	0

Quarterfinals
WC	(France) C Tabur	1	0
(Spain) A Davidovich Fokina	6	6

== Qualifying ==
=== Seeds ===
1. (Russia) Timofey Skatov (qualified)
2. (South Korea) Park Ui-sung (qualified)
3. (Japan) Toru Horie (first round)
4. (Netherlands) Ryan Nijboer (first round)
5. (Colombia) Nicolás Mejía (qualifying competition)
6. (Japan) Shinji Hazawa (first round)
7. (Brazil) Gabriel Décamps (first round)
8. (United Kingdom) Barnaby Smith (qualifying competition)
9. (Australia) Benard Bruno Nkomba (first round)
10. (Ukraine) Georgii Kravchenko (first round)
11. (Argentina) Thiago Agustín Tirante (qualified)
12. (Argentina) Francisco Vittar (first round)
13. (Italy) Francesco Forti (qualified)
14. (Colombia) Sergio Luis Hernández Ramírez (first round)
15. (United States) Lukas Greif (qualifying competition)
16. (United States) Andrew Fenty (first round)

=== Qualifiers ===
1. (Russia) Timofey Skatov
2. (South Korea) Park Ui-sung
3. (South Africa) Bertus Kruger
4. (France) Valentin Royer
5. (Argentina) Thiago Agustín Tirante
6. (Chile) Matías Soto
7. (Belgium) Tibo Colson
8. (Italy) Francesco Forti

=== Draw ===
==== First qualifier ====
First round
1	(Russia) Timofey Skatov	6	4	6
WC	(France) Baptiste Anselmo	2	6	1
(Brazil) João Lucas Reis da Silva	3	1
15	(United States) Lukas Greif	6	6

Qualifying competition
1	(Russia) Timofey Skatov	3	6	6
15	(United States) Lukas Greif	6	0	2

==== Second qualifier ====
First round
2	(South Korea) Park Ui-sung	7^{7}	7^{7}
(Sweden) Jonas Eriksson Ziverts	6^{1}	6^{3}
WC	(France) Luka Pavlovic	6	6
12	(Argentina) Francisco Vittar	4	3

Qualifying competition
2	(South Korea) Park Ui-sung	6	6
WC	(France) Luka Pavlovic	4	3

==== Third qualifier ====
First round
3	(Japan) Toru Horie	2	2
(South Africa) Bertus Kruger	6	6
(Bulgaria) Leonid Sheyngezikht	6	6
9	(Australia) Benard Bruno Nkomba	4	2

Qualifying competition
(South Africa) Bertus Kruger	4	6	7
(Bulgaria) Leonid Sheyngezikht	6	3	5

==== Fourth qualifier ====
First round
4	(Netherlands) Ryan Nijboer	5	3
(Italy) Mattia Frinzi	7	6
WC	(France) Valentin Royer	6	7
16	(United States) Andrew Fenty	3	5

Qualifying competition
(Italy) Mattia Frinzi	7^{7}	3	2
WC	(France) Valentin Royer	6^{1}	6	6

==== Fifth qualifier ====
First round
5	(Colombia) Nicolás Mejía	6	6
(Spain) Carlos López Montagud	0	0
(Russia) Mikhail Sokolovskiy	6	5	2
11	(Argentina) Thiago Agustín Tirante	4	7	6

Qualifying competition
5	(Colombia) Nicolás Mejía	4	5
11	(Argentina) Thiago Agustín Tirante	6	7

==== Sixth qualifier ====
First round
6	(Japan) Shinj Hazawa	4	6	2
(Chile) Matías Soto	6	1	6
WC	(France) Ugo Blanchet	4	6	6
14	(Colombia) Sergio Luis Hernández Ramírez	6	1	3

Qualifying competition
(Chile) Matías Soto	6	6
WC	(France) Ugo Blanchet	4	4

==== Seventh qualifier ====
First round
7	(Brazil) Gabriel Décamps	4	6	6^{4}
WC	(France) Harold Mayot	6	1	7^{7}
(Belgium) Tibo Colson	4	6	6
10	(Ukraine) Georgii Kravchenko	6	0	4

Qualifying competition
WC	(France) Harold Mayot	3	1
(Belgium) Tibo Colson	6	6

==== Eighth qualifier ====
First round
8	(United Kingdom) Barnaby Smith	6	6
WC	(France) Emmanuel Coste	2	2
(Philippines) Alberto Lim	3	2
13	(Italy) Francesco Forti	6	6

Qualifying competition
8	(United Kingdom) Barnaby Smith	6	2	4
13	(Italy) Francesco Forti	1	6	6
