= 2017 French Open – Boys' doubles =

Boys' doubles
- 2017 French Open

Final
- Champions: (Spain) Nicola Kuhn (Hungary) Zsombor Piros
- Runners-up: (United States) Vasil Kirkov (United States) Danny Thomas
- Score: 6–4, 6–4

Events
Singles	men	women		boys	girls
Doubles	men	women	mixed	boys	girls
WC Singles	men	women	quad
WC Doubles	men	women	quad
Legends	−45	45+	women
← 2016 ·	French Open	· 2018 →

Nicola Kuhn and Zsombor Piros won the boys' doubles tennis title at the 2017 French Open, defeating Vasil Kirkov and Danny Thomas in the final, 6–4, 6–4.

Yshai Oliel and Patrik Rikl were the defending champions, but Rikl chose not to participate. Oliel played alongside Benjamin Sigouin, but lost in the first round to Axel Geller and Nicolás Mejía.

== Seeds ==
1. (Spain) Nicola Kuhn / (Hungary) Zsombor Piros (champions)
2. (France) Constantin Bittoun Kouzmine / (Chinese Taipei) Hsu Yu-hsiou (second round)
3. (Spain) Alejandro Davidovich Fokina / (Australia) Alexei Popyrin (first round)
4. (Austria) Jurij Rodionov / (Czech Republic) Michael Vrbenský (semifinals)
5. (Germany) Rudolf Molleker / (Finland) Emil Ruusuvuori (quarterfinals)
6. (Serbia) Miomir Kecmanović / (United States) Sebastian Korda (quarterfinals)
7. (United States) Alafia Ayeni / (United States) Trent Bryde (second round)
8. (Israel) Yshai Oliel / (Canada) Benjamin Sigouin (first round)

== Draw ==
Key

- Q = Qualifier
- WC = Wild card
- LL = Lucky loser
- Alt = Alternate
- ITF = ITF entry
- PR = Protected ranking
- SR = Special ranking
- SE = Special exempt
- JE = Junior exempt
- JR = Junior Accelerator Programme entrant
- CO = College Accelerator Programme entrant
- NG = Next Gen Accelerator Program entrant
- w/o = Walkover
- r = Retired
- d = Defaulted

=== Finals ===
Semifinals
1	(Spain) Nicola Kuhn (Hungary) Zsombor Piros	6	6
(United States) Sam Riffice (United States) Gianni Ross	4	4
4	(Austria) Jurij Rodionov (Czech Republic) Michael Vrbenský	3	6	[8]
(United States) Vasil Kirkov (United States) Danny Thomas	6	2	[10]

Final
1	(Spain) Nicola Kuhn (Hungary) Zsombor Piros	6	6
(United States) Vasil Kirkov (United States) Danny Thomas	4	4

=== Top half ===
First round
1	(Spain) Nicola Kuhn (Hungary) Zsombor Piros	6	6
WC	(France) Luc Fomba (France) Luka Pavlovic	1	2
(Republic of Ireland) Simon Carr (Russia) Alexey Zakharov	2	2
(Japan) Toru Horie (Japan) Yuta Shimizu	6	6
(Netherlands) Ryan Nijboer (United States) Alexandre Rotsaert	4	6	[10]
WC	(France) Hugo Gaston (France) Clément Tabur	6	3	[4]
(Argentina) Juan Pablo Grassi Mazzuchi (Argentina) Thiago Agustín Tirante	5	7^{7}	[4]
7	(United States) Alafia Ayeni (United States) Trent Bryde	7	6^{5}	[10]
3	(Spain) Alejandro Davidovich Fokina (Australia) Alexei Popyrin	2	6	[8]
(United States) Sam Riffice (United States) Gianni Ross	6	1	[10]
(Russia) Timofey Skatov (Russia) Nikolay Vylegzhanin	3	4
(Mexico) Alan Fernando Rubio Fierros (Portugal) Duarte Vale	6	6
(France) Maxence Brovillé (France) Matteo Martineau	2	4
(Russia) Artem Dubrivnyy (Germany) Marvin Möller	6	6
(Argentina) Axel Geller (Colombia) Nicolás Mejía	7^{7}	6
8	(Israel) Yshai Oliel (Canada) Benjamin Sigouin	6^{2}	4

Second round
1	(Spain) N Kuhn (Hungary) Z Piros	2	6	[10]
(Japan) T Horie (Japan) Y Shimizu	6	3	[2]
(Netherlands) R Nijboer (United States) A Rotsaert	6	6
7	(United States) A Ayeni (United States) T Bryde	0	3
(United States) S Riffice (United States) G Ross	4	6	[10]
(Mexico) AF Rubio Fierros (Portugal) D Vale	6	4	[5]
(Russia) A Dubrivnyy (Germany) M Möller	3	1
(Argentina) A Geller (Colombia) N Mejía	6	6

Quarterfinals
1	(Spain) N Kuhn (Hungary) Z Piros	4	6	[10]
(Netherlands) R Nijboer (United States) A Rotsaert	6	3	[5]
(United States) S Riffice (United States) G Ross	3	6	[10]
(Argentina) A Geller (Colombia) N Mejía	6	2	[7]

Semifinals
1	(Spain) N Kuhn (Hungary) Z Piros	6	6
(United States) S Riffice (United States) G Ross	4	4

=== Bottom half ===
First round
6	(Serbia) Miomir Kecmanović (United States) Sebastian Korda	6	6
(Ukraine) Nikita Mashtakov (Serbia) Marko Miladinović	2	2
(South Africa) Bertus Kruger (France) Valentin Royer	2	4
(France) Dan Added (Belgium) Zizou Bergs	6	6
WC	(France) Baptiste Anselmo (France) Maxence Beaugé
(United States) Oliver Crawford (United States) Patrick Kypson	w/o
(Brazil) Thiago Seyboth Wild (Russia) Mikhail Sokolovskiy
4	(Austria) Jurij Rodionov (Czech Republic) Michael Vrbenský	w/o
5	(Germany) Rudolf Molleker (Finland) Emil Ruusuvuori	6	6
(Argentina) Sebastián Báez (Czech Republic) Ondřej Štyler	3	4
(South Korea) Park Ui-sung (Chile) Matías Soto	6	4	[10]
(United States) Brian Cernoch (Czech Republic) Tomáš Macháč	3	6	[6]
WC	(France) Jaimee Floyd Angele (France) Louis Dussin	2	4
(United States) Vasil Kirkov (United States) Danny Thomas	6	6
(Japan) Naoki Tajima (Chinese Taipei) Tseng Chun-hsin	3	4
2	(France) Constantin Bittoun Kouzmine (Chinese Taipei) Hsu Yu-hsiou	6	6

Second round
6	(Serbia) M Kecmanović (United States) S Korda	6	5	[10]
(France) D Added (Belgium) Z Bergs	4	7	[8]
(United States) O Crawford (United States) P Kypson	4	3
4	(Austria) J Rodionov (Czech Republic) M Vrbenský	6	6
5	(Germany) R Molleker (Finland) E Ruusuvuori	6	6
(South Korea) U-s Park (Chile) M Soto	3	2
(United States) V Kirkov (United States) D Thomas	7	7^{7}
2	(France) C Bittoun Kouzmine (Chinese Taipei) Y-h Hsu	5	6^{5}

Quarterfinals
6	(Serbia) M Kecmanović (United States) S Korda	4	6	[8]
4	(Austria) J Rodionov (Czech Republic) M Vrbenský	6	3	[10]
5	(Germany) R Molleker (Finland) E Ruusuvuori	5	6^{1}
(United States) V Kirkov (United States) D Thomas	7	7^{7}

Semifinals
4	(Austria) J Rodionov (Czech Republic) M Vrbenský	3	6	[8]
(United States) V Kirkov (United States) D Thomas	6	2	[10]
