= 2017 French Open – Wheelchair women's singles =

Wheelchair women's singles
- 2017 French Open

Final
- Champion: (Japan) Yui Kamiji
- Runner-up: (Germany) Sabine Ellerbrock
- Score: 7–5, 6–4

Events
Singles	men	women		boys	girls
Doubles	men	women	mixed	boys	girls
WC Singles	men	women	quad
WC Doubles	men	women	quad
Legends	−45	45+	women
- French Open

Yui Kamiji defeated Sabine Ellerbrock in the final, 7–5, 6–4 to win the women's singles wheelchair tennis title at the 2017 French Open.

Marjolein Buis was the defending champion, but was defeated by Kamiji in the semifinals.

== Seeds ==
1. (Netherlands) Jiske Griffioen (quarterfinals)
2. (Japan) Yui Kamiji (champion)

== Draw ==
Key

- Q = Qualifier
- WC = Wild card
- LL = Lucky loser
- Alt = Alternate
- ITF = ITF entry
- PR = Protected ranking
- SR = Special ranking
- SE = Special exempt
- JE = Junior exempt
- JR = Junior Accelerator Programme entrant
- CO = College Accelerator Programme entrant
- NG = Next Gen Accelerator Program entrant
- w/o = Walkover
- r = Retired
- d = Defaulted

=== Finals ===
Quarterfinals
1	(Netherlands) Jiske Griffioen	7^{7}	0	3
(Netherlands) Aniek van Koot	6^{4}	6	6
(Germany) Sabine Ellerbrock	6	6
(United Kingdom) Jordanne Whiley	3	2
(Netherlands) Diede de Groot	6^{7}	6	5
(Netherlands) Marjolein Buis	7^{9}	4	7
WC	(France) Charlotte Famin	2	1
2	(Japan) Yui Kamiji	6	6

Semifinals
(Netherlands) Aniek van Koot	6^{2}	6^{5}
(Germany) Sabine Ellerbrock	7^{7}	7^{7}
(Netherlands) Marjolein Buis	3	3
2	(Japan) Yui Kamiji	6	6

Final
(Germany) Sabine Ellerbrock	5	4
2	(Japan) Yui Kamiji	7	6
