= Trent Bryde =

American tennis player

- Full name: Trent Bryde
- Country (sports): United States
- Residence: Atlanta, Georgia
- Born: 24 August 1999 (age 26) Suwanee, Georgia
- Height: 1.80 m (5 ft 11 in)
- Plays: Right-handed (two-handed backhand)
- College: University of Georgia
- Coach: Will Wright
- Prize money: $29,416

Singles
- Career record: 0–1
- Career titles: 0
- Highest ranking: No. 625 (24 December 2018)

Doubles
- Career record: 0–0
- Career titles: 0
- Highest ranking: No. 843 (16 October 2023)

Trent Bryde (born 24 August 1999) is an American tennis player.

== Early life ==
Bryde, the son of Bruce and Kathi Bryde, is from Atlanta, Georgia. He attended and played collegiate tennis at the University of Georgia where he majored in consumer economics.

== Career ==
Bryde was very successful in his junior career. Achieving a high ranking of 8 in both the singles and the doubles and posting a win–loss record of 107–69 in the singles and 92–52 in the doubles.

Bryde was given a wildcard into the 2019 BB&T Atlanta Open qualifying draw but lost in the first round to Kamil Majchrzak. At the very next edition, he was given his ATP tour debut as a wildcard at the 2021 Atlanta Open where he was drawn against Brandon Nakashima in the first round. He lost to Nakashima in a hard-fought match 1–6, 7–6^{(7–5)}, 4–6.
