= 2017 French Open – Girls' doubles =

Girls' doubles
- 2017 French Open

Final
- Champions: (Canada) Bianca Andreescu (Canada) Carson Branstine
- Runners-up: (Russia) Olesya Pervushina (Russia) Anastasia Potapova
- Score: 6–1, 6–3

Events
Singles	men	women		boys	girls
Doubles	men	women	mixed	boys	girls
WC Singles	men	women	quad
WC Doubles	men	women	quad
Legends	−45	45+	women
← 2016 ·	French Open	· 2018 →

Bianca Andreescu and Carson Branstine won the title, defeating Olesya Pervushina and Anastasia Potapova in the final, 6–1, 6–3. They saved a match point en route to the title, in the second round against Amina Anshba and Kaja Juvan.

Paula Arias Manjón and Olga Danilović were the defending champions, but lost in the first round to Chen Pei-hsuan and Naho Sato.

== Seeds ==
1. (Canada) Bianca Andreescu / (Canada) Carson Branstine (champions)
2. (Russia) Olesya Pervushina / (Russia) Anastasia Potapova (final)
3. (United States) Taylor Johnson / (United States) Claire Liu (quarterfinals)
4. (Ukraine) Marta Kostyuk / (Ukraine) Katarina Zavatska (first round, withdrew)
5. (United Kingdom) Emily Appleton / (Russia) Elena Rybakina (second round)
6. (Chinese Taipei) Liang En-shuo / (China) Wang Xinyu (second round)
7. (Japan) Mai Hontama / (Japan) Yuki Naito (first round)
8. (United States) Caty McNally / (United States) Whitney Osuigwe (quarterfinals)

== Draw ==
=== Key ===
- Q = Qualifier
- WC = Wild card
- LL = Lucky loser
- Alt = Alternate
- SE = Special exempt
- PR = Protected ranking
- ITF = ITF entry
- JE = Junior exempt
- w/o = Walkover
- r = Retired
- d = Defaulted
- SR = Special ranking

=== Finals ===
Semifinals
1	(Canada) Bianca Andreescu (Canada) Carson Branstine	6	6
(Argentina) María Lourdes Carlé (United Kingdom) Francesca Jones	4	2
(Japan) Ayumi Miyamoto (China) Wang Xiyu	3	6	[6]
2	(Russia) Olesya Pervushina (Russia) Anastasia Potapova	6	3	[10]

Final
1	(Canada) Bianca Andreescu (Canada) Carson Branstine	6	6
2	(Russia) Olesya Pervushina (Russia) Anastasia Potapova	1	3

=== Top half ===
First round
1	(Canada) Bianca Andreescu (Canada) Carson Branstine	6	7^{7}
(Mexico) María José Portillo Ramírez (United States) Sofia Sewing	2	6^{5}
(Russia) Sofya Lansere (Russia) Kamilla Rakhimova	2	4
(Russia) Amina Anshba (Slovenia) Kaja Juvan	6	6
(Colombia) Camila Osorio (Brazil) Thaisa Grana Pedretti	6	5	[10]
(Poland) Maja Chwalińska (Poland) Iga Świątek	4	7	[5]
WC	(France) Maëlys Bougrat (France) Émeline Dartron	6	4	[4]
6	(Chinese Taipei) Liang En-shuo (China) Wang Xinyu	2	6	[10]
3	(United States) Taylor Johnson (United States) Claire Liu	6	3	[10]
(Japan) Anri Nagata (Russia) Ekaterina Vishnevskaya	2	6	[4]
(Colombia) Emiliana Arango (United States) Ellie Douglas	6	7^{7}
WC	(France) Giulia Morlet (France) Diane Parry	4	6^{5}
(Argentina) María Lourdes Carlé (United Kingdom) Francesca Jones	6	6
(Russia) Alina Charaeva (Russia) Anastasia Kharitonova	4	3
(France) Loudmilla Bencheikh (France) Manon Léonard	6	3	[10]
7	(Japan) Mai Hontama (Japan) Yuki Naito	0	6	[7]

Second round
1	(Canada) B Andreescu (Canada) C Branstine	3	6	[13]
(Russia) A Anshba (Slovenia) K Juvan	6	3	[11]
(Colombia) C Osorio (Brazil) TG Pedretti	6	6
6	(Chinese Taipei) E-s Liang (China) Xin Wang	4	1
3	(United States) T Johnson (United States) C Liu	6^{2}	6	[10]
(Colombia) E Arango (United States) E Douglas	7^{7}	2	[8]
(Argentina) ML Carlé (United Kingdom) F Jones	4	7	[11]
(France) L Bencheikh (France) M Léonard	6	5	[9]

Quarterfinals
1	(Canada) B Andreescu (Canada) C Branstine	6	7^{8}
(Colombia) C Osorio (Brazil) TG Pedretti	3	6^{6}
3	(United States) T Johnson (United States) C Liu	6	4	[3]
(Argentina) ML Carlé (United Kingdom) F Jones	2	6	[10]

Semifinals
1	(Canada) B Andreescu (Canada) C Branstine	6	6
(Argentina) ML Carlé (United Kingdom) F Jones	4	2

=== Bottom half ===
First round
5	(United Kingdom) Emily Appleton (Russia) Elena Rybakina	6	6
(United States) Hailey Baptiste (United States) Elysia Bolton	3	3
WC	(France) Jade Bornay (France) Mylène Halemai	6	1	[10]
(Czech Republic) Denisa Hindová (Switzerland) Simona Waltert	1	6	[8]
(Japan) Ayumi Miyamoto (China) Wang Xiyu	2	7	[10]
(Russia) Valeriya Deminova (Russia) Varvara Gracheva	6	5	[7]
(India) Zeel Desai (Chile) Fernanda Labraña	w/o
4	(Ukraine) Marta Kostyuk (Ukraine) Katarina Zavatska
8	(United States) Caty McNally (United States) Whitney Osuigwe	7^{15}	7^{7}
(Finland) Oona Orpana (Germany) Lara Schmidt	6^{13}	6^{3}
(Germany) Jule Niemeier (Latvia) Daniela Vismane	6	5	[8]
WC	(France) Clara Burel (France) Yasmine Mansouri	3	7	[10]
(Spain) Paula Arias Manjón (Serbia) Olga Danilović	1	6	[7]
(Chinese Taipei) Chen Pei-hsuan (Japan) Naho Sato	6	3	[10]
(Russia) Anzhelika Isaeva (Italy) Tatiana Pieri	5	3
2	(Russia) Olesya Pervushina (Russia) Anastasia Potapova	7	6

Second round
5	(United Kingdom) E Appleton (Russia) E Rybakina	6	6^{6}	[5]
WC	(France) J Bornay (France) M Halemai	2	7^{8}	[10]
(Japan) A Miyamoto (China) Xiy Wang	7	6
(India) Z Desai (Chile) F Labraña	5	2
8	(United States) C McNally (United States) W Osuigwe	2	6	[10]
WC	(France) C Burel (France) Y Mansouri	6	3	[3]
(Chinese Taipei) P-h Chen (Japan) N Sato	4	4
2	(Russia) O Pervushina (Russia) A Potapova	6	6

Quarterfinals
WC	(France) J Bornay (France) M Halemai	1	2
(Japan) A Miyamoto (China) Xiy Wang	6	6
8	(United States) C McNally (United States) W Osuigwe	1	6	[10]
2	(Russia) O Pervushina (Russia) A Potapova	6	1	[12]

Semifinals
(Japan) A Miyamoto (China) Xiy Wang	3	6	[6]
2	(Russia) O Pervushina (Russia) A Potapova	6	3	[10]
