= 2017 French Open – Wheelchair men's singles =

Wheelchair men's singles
- 2017 French Open

Final
- Champion: (United Kingdom) Alfie Hewett
- Runner-up: (Argentina) Gustavo Fernández
- Score: 0–6, 7–6^{(11–9)}, 6–2

Events
Singles	men	women		boys	girls
Doubles	men	women	mixed	boys	girls
WC Singles	men	women	quad
WC Doubles	men	women	quad
Legends	−45	45+	women
- French Open

Alfie Hewett defeated the defending champion Gustavo Fernández in the final, 0–6, 7–6^{(11–9)}, 6–2 to win the men's singles wheelchair tennis title at the 2017 French Open. It was his first major singles title.

== Seeds ==
1. (United Kingdom) Gordon Reid (quarterfinals)
2. (France) Stéphane Houdet (quarterfinals)

== Draw ==
=== Finals ===
Quarterfinals
1	(United Kingdom) Gordon Reid	2	0
(Argentina) Gustavo Fernández	6	6
(France) Nicolas Peifer	6	6
(Netherlands) Maikel Scheffers	1	1
(Sweden) Stefan Olsson	6^{5}	3
(United Kingdom) Alfie Hewett	7^{7}	6
WC	(Japan) Shingo Kunieda	6	4	6
2	(France) Stéphane Houdet	4	6	3

Semifinals
(Argentina) Gustavo Fernández	6	6
(France) Nicolas Peifer	2	2
(United Kingdom) Alfie Hewett	6	6
WC	(Japan) Shingo Kunieda	4	4

Final
(Argentina) Gustavo Fernández	6	6^{9}	2
(United Kingdom) Alfie Hewett	0	7^{11}	6
