= 2017 French Open – Wheelchair men's doubles =

Wheelchair men's doubles
- 2017 French Open

Final
- Champions: (France) Stéphane Houdet (France) Nicolas Peifer
- Runners-up: (United Kingdom) Alfie Hewett (United Kingdom) Gordon Reid
- Score: 6–4, 6–3

Events
Singles	men	women		boys	girls
Doubles	men	women	mixed	boys	girls
WC Singles	men	women	quad
WC Doubles	men	women	quad
Legends	−45	45+	women
- French Open

Stéphane Houdet and Nicolas Peifer defeated the two-time defending champion Gordon Reid and his partner Alfie Hewett in the final, 6–4, 6–3 to win the men's doubles wheelchair tennis title at the 2017 French Open.

Shingo Kunieda and Reid were the two-time defending champions, but did not play together. Kunieda partnered Stefan Olsson, but was defeated by Houdet and Peifer in the semifinals.

== Seeds ==
1. (France) Stéphane Houdet / (France) Nicolas Peifer (champions)
2. (United Kingdom) Alfie Hewett / (United Kingdom) Gordon Reid (final)

== Draw ==
Key

- Q = Qualifier
- WC = Wild card
- LL = Lucky loser
- Alt = Alternate
- ITF = ITF entry
- PR = Protected ranking
- SR = Special ranking
- SE = Special exempt
- JE = Junior exempt
- JR = Junior Accelerator Programme entrant
- CO = College Accelerator Programme entrant
- NG = Next Gen Accelerator Program entrant
- w/o = Walkover
- r = Retired
- d = Defaulted

=== Finals ===
Semifinals
1	(France) Stéphane Houdet (France) Nicolas Peifer	3	6	[12]
(Japan) Shingo Kunieda (Sweden) Stefan Olsson	6	2	[10]
(Argentina) Gustavo Fernández (Netherlands) Maikel Scheffers	4	6	[8]
2	(United Kingdom) Alfie Hewett (United Kingdom) Gordon Reid	6	3	[10]

Final
1	(France) Stéphane Houdet (France) Nicolas Peifer	6	6
2	(United Kingdom) Alfie Hewett (United Kingdom) Gordon Reid	4	3
