= 2017 French Open – Girls' singles =

Girls' singles
- 2017 French Open

Final
- Champion: (United States) Whitney Osuigwe
- Runner-up: (United States) Claire Liu
- Score: 6–4, 6–7^{(5–7)}, 6–3

Events
Singles	men	women		boys	girls
Doubles	men	women	mixed	boys	girls
WC Singles	men	women	quad
WC Doubles	men	women	quad
Legends	−45	45+	women
← 2016 ·	French Open	· 2018 →

Rebeka Masarova was the defending champion, but chose not to participate.

Whitney Osuigwe won the title, defeating Claire Liu in the final, 6–4, 6–7^{(5–7)}, 6–3. Osuigwe became the first American to win the girls' singles title since Jennifer Capriati in 1989.

== Seeds ==
1. (Russia) Anastasia Potapova (third round)
2. (United States) Amanda Anisimova (quarterfinals)
3. (Canada) Bianca Andreescu (quarterfinals)
4. (Ukraine) Marta Kostyuk (second round)
5. (Poland) Iga Świątek (quarterfinals)
6. (United States) Claire Liu (final)
7. (United States) Whitney Osuigwe (champion)
8. (Canada) Carson Branstine (first round)
9. (Serbia) Olga Danilović (first round)
10. (United States) Taylor Johnson (first round)
11. (Russia) Elena Rybakina (semifinals)
12. (Russia) Olesya Pervushina (third round)
13. (United Kingdom) Emily Appleton (second round)
14. (Ukraine) Katarina Zavatska (first round)
15. (Colombia) Camila Osorio (third round)
16. (Japan) Mai Hontama (second round)

== Draw ==
=== Key ===
- Q = Qualifier
- WC = Wild card
- LL = Lucky loser
- Alt = Alternate
- ITF = ITF entry
- PR = Protected ranking
- SR = Special ranking
- SE = Special exempt
- JE = Junior exempt
- JR = Junior Accelerator Programme entrant
- CO = College Accelerator Programme entrant
- NG = Next Gen Accelerator Program entrant
- w/o = Walkover
- r = Retired
- d = Defaulted

=== Finals ===
Quarterfinals
(Russia) Marta Paigina	6	6
5	(Poland) Iga Świątek	2	3
3	(Canada) Bianca Andreescu	3	3
6	(United States) Claire Liu	6	6
7	(United States) Whitney Osuigwe	6	6
(United States) Caty McNally	3	3
11	(Russia) Elena Rybakina	7^{9}	6
2	(United States) Amanda Anisimova	6^{7}	4

Semifinals
(Russia) Marta Paigina	2	0
6	(United States) Claire Liu	6	6
7	(United States) Whitney Osuigwe	6	6
11	(Russia) Elena Rybakina	4	4

Final
6	(United States) Claire Liu	4	7^{7}	3
7	(United States) Whitney Osuigwe	6	6^{5}	6

=== Top half ===
==== Section 1 ====
First round
1	(Russia) Anastasia Potapova	6	6
(Slovenia) Kaja Juvan	4	4
SE	(Japan) Naho Sato	3	4
(United States) Elysia Bolton	6	6
(Russia) Marta Paigina	7^{7}	6
WC	(France) Émeline Dartron	6^{4}	0
(Czech Republic) Denisa Hindová	1	5
13	(United Kingdom) Emily Appleton	6	7
10	(United States) Taylor Johnson	6	3	2
(Italy) Tatiana Pieri	2	6	6
Q	(Switzerland) Ylena In-Albon	6	6
Q	(France) Manon Léonard	0	1
(Russia) Anastasia Kharitonova	7	2	5
(Colombia) Emiliana Arango	5	6	7
(Chinese Taipei) Liang En-shuo	1	2
5	(Poland) Iga Świątek	6	6

Second round
1	(Russia) A Potapova	6	6
(United States) E Bolton	3	0
(Russia) M Paigina	6	6
13	(United Kingdom) E Appleton	1	2
(Italy) T Pieri	0	1
Q	(Switzerland) Y In-Albon	6	6
(Colombia) E Arango	2	3
5	(Poland) I Świątek	6	6

Third round
1	(Russia) A Potapova	6	3	3
(Russia) M Paigina	2	6	6
Q	(Switzerland) Y In-Albon	0	0
5	(Poland) I Świątek	6	6

Quarterfinals
(Russia) M Paigina	6	6
5	(Poland) I Świątek	2	3

==== Section 2 ====
First round
3	(Canada) Bianca Andreescu	6	6
WC	(France) Loudmilla Bencheikh	1	2
(United States) Ellie Douglas	6	3	5
(China) Wang Xiyu	4	6	7
Q	(Chile) Fernanda Labraña	4	1
(Russia) Sofya Lansere	6	6
(Brazil) Thaísa Grana Pedretti	6	6
14	(Ukraine) Katarina Zavatska	1	4
12	(Russia) Olesya Pervushina	7^{7}	5	6
Q	(Germany) Jule Niemeier	6^{0}	7	2
(Latvia) Daniela Vismane	6	6
(India) Zeel Desai	0	2
(Japan) Yuki Naito	6	6^{7}	6^{6}
WC	(France) Yasmine Mansouri	3	7^{9}	7^{8}
(Russia) Kamilla Rakhimova	0	1
6	(United States) Claire Liu	6	6

Second round
3	(Canada) B Andreescu	4	6	6
(China) Xiy Wang	6	3	1
(Russia) S Lansere	6	6
(Brazil) TG Pedretti	4	2
12	(Russia) O Pervushina	6	5	6
(Latvia) D Vismane	2	7	3
WC	(France) Y Mansouri	2	3
6	(United States) C Liu	6	6

Third round
3	(Canada) B Andreescu	6	6
(Russia) S Lansere	2	2
12	(Russia) O Pervushina	3	3
6	(United States) C Liu	6	6

Quarterfinals
3	(Canada) B Andreescu	3	3
6	(United States) C Liu	6	6

=== Bottom half ===
==== Section 3 ====
First round
7	(United States) Whitney Osuigwe	6^{5}	6	6
(Switzerland) Simona Waltert	7^{7}	2	1
WC	(France) Giulia Morlet	6	6
(Mexico) María José Portillo Ramírez	4	1
(United States) Sofia Sewing	6^{6}	4
(Russia) Varvara Gracheva	7^{8}	6
(China) Wang Xinyu	6	6
9	(Serbia) Olga Danilović	3	2
16	(Japan) Mai Hontama	2	6	6
(United Kingdom) Francesca Jones	6	0	4
(United States) Caty McNally	7	6
(Russia) Alina Charaeva	5	3
(Argentina) María Lourdes Carlé	3	3
(Russia) Amina Anshba	6	6
WC	(France) Mylène Halemai	3	2
4	(Ukraine) Marta Kostyuk	6	6

Second round
7	(United States) W Osuigwe	6	4	6
WC	(France) G Morlet	3	6	0
(Russia) V Gracheva	6	3	2
(China) Xin Wang	4	6	6
16	(Japan) M Hontama	3	6^{4}
(United States) C McNally	6	7^{7}
(Russia) A Anshba	3	7^{7}	6
4	(Ukraine) M Kostyuk	6	6^{5}	3

Third round
7	(United States) W Osuigwe	6	4	6
(China) Xin Wang	3	6	4
(United States) C McNally	6	4	6
(Russia) A Anshba	2	6	1

Quarterfinals
7	(United States) W Osuigwe	6	6
(United States) C McNally	3	3

==== Section 4 ====
First round
8	(Canada) Carson Branstine	6	3	1
(Spain) Paula Arias Manjón	3	6	6
Q	(Chinese Taipei) Chen Pei-hsuan	6^{5}	6^{5}
(United States) Hailey Baptiste	7^{7}	7^{7}
Q	(Germany) Lara Schmidt	6	7^{7}
WC	(France) Diane Parry	3	6^{5}
(Japan) Anri Nagata	5	1
11	(Russia) Elena Rybakina	7	6
15	(Colombia) Camila Osorio	3	6	6
(Japan) Ayumi Miyamoto	6	4	3
LL	(Slovakia) Barbora Matúšová	6	6
Q	(Russia) Ekaterina Vishnevskaya	1	4
SE	(Russia) Anzhelika Isaeva	6	6
Q	(Finland) Oona Orpana	2	3
WC	(France) Clara Burel	1	5
2	(United States) Amanda Anisimova	6	7

Second round
(Spain) P Arias Manjón	6	6^{4}	4
(United States) H Baptiste	4	7^{7}	6
Q	(Germany) L Schmidt	7	2	3
11	(Russia) E Rybakina	5	6	6
15	(Colombia) C Osorio	6	4	6
LL	(Slovakia) B Matúšová	4	6	4
SE	(Russia) A Isaeva	1	4
2	(United States) A Anisimova	6	6

Third round
(United States) H Baptiste	2	4
11	(Russia) E Rybakina	6	6
15	(Colombia) C Osorio	2	4
2	(United States) A Anisimova	6	6

Quarterfinals
11	(Russia) E Rybakina	7^{9}	6
2	(United States) A Anisimova	6^{7}	4

== Qualifying ==
=== Seeds ===
1. (Switzerland) Ylena In-Albon (qualified)
2. (Chile) Fernanda Labraña (qualified)
3. (Czech Republic) Karolína Beránková (qualifying competition)
4. (Chinese Taipei) Chen Pei-hsuan (qualified)
5. (Norway) Astrid Wanja Brune Olsen (first round)
6. (Romania) Mihaela Lorena Mărculescu (first round)
7. (United States) Hurricane Tyra Black (qualifying competition)
8. (Slovakia) Viktória Morvayová (qualifying competition)
9. (Chinese Taipei) Cho I-hsuan (first round)
10. (Germany) Lara Schmidt (qualified)
11. (Colombia) Sofía Múnera Sánchez (first round)
12. (United States) Amanda Meyer (qualifying competition)
13. (Bulgaria) Gergana Topalova (qualifying competition)
14. (Serbia) Draginja Vuković (qualifying competition)
15. (Germany) Jule Niemeier (qualified)
16. (Russia) Valeriya Deminova (first round)

=== Qualifiers ===
1. (Switzerland) Ylena In-Albon
2. (Chile) Fernanda Labraña
3. (Russia) Ekaterina Vishnevskaya
4. (Chinese Taipei) Chen Pei-hsuan
5. (Germany) Jule Niemeier
6. (Finland) Oona Orpana
7. (France) Manon Léonard
8. (Germany) Lara Schmidt

=== Lucky losers ===
1. (Slovakia) Barbora Matúšová

=== Draw ===
==== First qualifier ====
First round
1	(Switzerland) Ylena In-Albon	6	6
WC	(France) Jade Bornay	1	1
(Norway) Malene Helgø	6^{6}	6^{4}
12	(United States) Amanda Meyer	7^{8}	7^{7}

Qualifying competition
1	(Switzerland) Ylena In-Albon	6	6
12	(United States) Amanda Meyer	3	3

==== Second qualifier ====
First round
2	(Chile) Fernanda Labraña	6	3	7
(Ukraine) Anna Laguza	4	6	5
WC	(France) Salma Djoubri	5	6	3
13	(Bulgaria) Gergana Topalova	7	3	6

Qualifying competition
2	(Chile) Fernanda Labraña	7	6
13	(Bulgaria) Gergana Topalova	5	3

==== Third qualifier ====
First round
3	(Czech Republic) Karolína Beránková	6	7^{7}
WC	(France) Aubane Droguet	2	6^{2}
(Russia) Ekaterina Vishnevskaya	2	6	7
9	(Chinese Taipei) Cho I-hsuan	6	2	5

Qualifying competition
3	(Czech Republic) Karolína Beránková	0	6	1
(Russia) Ekaterina Vishnevskaya	6	4	6

==== Fourth qualifier ====
First round
4	(Chinese Taipei) Chen Pei-hsuan	2	7^{7}	6
(Germany) Irina Cantos Siemers	6	6^{2}	4
(Slovakia) Barbora Matúšová	6	4	6
11	(Colombia) Sofía Múnera Sánchez	4	6	3

Qualifying competition
4	(Chinese Taipei) Chen Pei-hsuan	7	6
(Slovakia) Barbora Matúšová	5	4

==== Fifth qualifier ====
First round
5	(Norway) Astrid Wanja Brune Olsen	3	2
WC	(France) Maëlys Bougrat	6	6
(Poland) Maja Chwalińska	3	6^{3}
15	(Germany) Jule Niemeier	6	7^{7}

Qualifying competition
WC	(France) Maëlys Bougrat	0	2
15	(Germany) Jule Niemeier	6	6

==== Sixth qualifier ====
First round
6	(Romania) Mihaela Lorena Mărculescu	0	5
(Finland) Oona Orpana	6	7
WC	(France) Carole Monnet	4	3
14	(Serbia) Draginja Vuković	6	6

Qualifying competition
(Finland) Oona Orpana	6	6
14	(Serbia) Draginja Vuković	2	1

==== Seventh qualifier ====
First round
7	(United States) Hurricane Tyra Black	6	6
(Thailand) Thasaporn Naklo	1	3
WC	(France) Manon Léonard	7^{8}	7
16	(Russia) Valeriya Deminova	6^{6}	5

Qualifying competition
7	(United States) Hurricane Tyra Black	6	6^{6}	0
WC	(France) Manon Léonard	2	7^{8}	6

==== Eighth qualifier ====
First round
8	(Slovakia) Viktória Morvayová	6	3	6
(Israel) Shelly Krolitzky	1	6	4
(Peru) Anastasia Iamachkine	3	2
10	(Germany) Lara Schmidt	6	6

Qualifying competition
8	(Slovakia) Viktória Morvayová	7	1	3
10	(Germany) Lara Schmidt	5	6	6
