= 2017 French Open – Wheelchair women's doubles =

Wheelchair women's doubles
- 2017 French Open

Final
- Champions: (Netherlands) Marjolein Buis (Japan) Yui Kamiji
- Runners-up: (Netherlands) Jiske Griffioen (Netherlands) Aniek van Koot
- Score: 6–3, 7–5

Events
Singles	men	women		boys	girls
Doubles	men	women	mixed	boys	girls
WC Singles	men	women	quad
WC Doubles	men	women	quad
Legends	−45	45+	women
- French Open

Defending champion Yui Kamiji and her partner Marjolein Buis defeated Jiske Griffioen and Aniek van Koot in the final, 6–3, 7–5 to win the women's doubles wheelchair tennis title at the 2017 French Open.

Kamiji and Jordanne Whiley were the defending champions, but did not play together. Whiley partnered Diede de Groot, but was defeated in the semifinals by Buis and Kamiji.

== Seeds ==
1. (Netherlands) Jiske Griffioen / (Netherlands) Aniek van Koot (final)
2. (Netherlands) Marjolein Buis / (Japan) Yui Kamiji (champions)

== Draw ==
Key

- Q = Qualifier
- WC = Wild card
- LL = Lucky loser
- Alt = Alternate
- ITF = ITF entry
- PR = Protected ranking
- SR = Special ranking
- SE = Special exempt
- JE = Junior exempt
- JR = Junior Accelerator Programme entrant
- CO = College Accelerator Programme entrant
- NG = Next Gen Accelerator Program entrant
- w/o = Walkover
- r = Retired
- d = Defaulted

=== Finals ===
Semifinals
1	(Netherlands) Jiske Griffioen (Netherlands) Aniek van Koot	6	6
(Germany) Sabine Ellerbrock (France) Charlotte Famin	4	4
(Netherlands) Diede de Groot (United Kingdom) Jordanne Whiley	5	1
2	(Netherlands) Marjolein Buis (Japan) Yui Kamiji	7	6

Final
1	(Netherlands) Jiske Griffioen (Netherlands) Aniek van Koot	3	5
2	(Netherlands) Marjolein Buis (Japan) Yui Kamiji	6	7
