= 2017 French Open – Mixed doubles =

Mixed doubles
- 2017 French Open

Final
- Champions: (Canada) Gabriela Dabrowski (India) Rohan Bopanna
- Runners-up: (Germany) Anna-Lena Grönefeld (Colombia) Robert Farah
- Score: 2–6, 6–2, [12–10]

Details
- Draw: 32
- Seeds: 8

Events
Singles	men	women		boys	girls
Doubles	men	women	mixed	boys	girls
WC Singles	men	women	quad
WC Doubles	men	women	quad
Legends	−45	45+	women
- French Open

Gabriela Dabrowski and Rohan Bopanna won the mixed doubles tennis title at the 2017 French Open, defeating Anna-Lena Grönefeld and Robert Farah in the final, 2–6, 6–2, [12–10]. They saved two championship points in the third-set tiebreak.

Martina Hingis and Leander Paes were the defending champions, but lost in the first round to Katarina Srebotnik and Raven Klaasen.

== Seeds ==
1. (Chinese Taipei) Chan Yung-jan / (Australia) John Peers (first round)
2. (India) Sania Mirza / (Croatia) Ivan Dodig (quarterfinals)
3. (Czech Republic) Andrea Hlaváčková / (France) Édouard Roger-Vasselin (semifinals)
4. (Slovenia) Katarina Srebotnik / (South Africa) Raven Klaasen (second round)
5. (Kazakhstan) Yaroslava Shvedova / (Austria) Alexander Peya (second round, retired)
6. (Chinese Taipei) Chan Hao-ching / (Netherlands) Jean-Julien Rojer (second round)
7. (Canada) Gabriela Dabrowski / (India) Rohan Bopanna (champions)
8. (Latvia) Jeļena Ostapenko / (Brazil) Bruno Soares (first round)

== Draw ==
Key

- Q = Qualifier
- WC = Wild card
- LL = Lucky loser
- Alt = Alternate
- ITF = ITF entry
- PR = Protected ranking
- SR = Special ranking
- SE = Special exempt
- JE = Junior exempt
- JR = Junior Accelerator Programme entrant
- CO = College Accelerator Programme entrant
- NG = Next Gen Accelerator Program entrant
- w/o = Walkover
- r = Retired
- d = Defaulted

=== Finals ===
Semifinals
(Germany) Anna-Lena Grönefeld (Colombia) Robert Farah	6^{5}	6	[10]
(Australia) Casey Dellacqua (United States) Rajeev Ram	7^{7}	3	[5]
3	(Czech Republic) Andrea Hlaváčková (France) Édouard Roger-Vasselin	5	3
7	(Canada) Gabriela Dabrowski (India) Rohan Bopanna	7	6

Final
(Germany) Anna-Lena Grönefeld (Colombia) Robert Farah	6	2	[10]
7	(Canada) Gabriela Dabrowski (India) Rohan Bopanna	2	6	[12]

=== Top half ===
First round
1	(Chinese Taipei) Y-j Chan (Australia) J Peers	4	2
(United States) A Spears (Colombia) JS Cabal	6	6
(Australia) An Rodionova (Croatia) N Mektić	5	2
Alt	(Spain) MJ Martínez Sánchez (Brazil) M Demoliner	7	6
(Germany) A-L Grönefeld (Colombia) R Farah	6	7^{7}
(United States) C McHale (United States) B Baker	1	6^{5}
(United States) C Vandeweghe (Belarus) M Mirnyi	5	3
5	(Kazakhstan) Y Shvedova (Austria) A Peya	7	6
4	(Slovenia) K Srebotnik (South Africa) R Klaasen	6	1	[10]
(Switzerland) M Hingis (India) L Paes	4	6	[2]
(United States) B Mattek-Sands (United States) S Johnson	4	4
(Czech Republic) L Hradecká (Poland) M Matkowski	6	6
WC	(France) V Razzano (France) V Millot	5	3
(Australia) C Dellacqua (United States) R Ram	7	6
(Russia) A Kudryavtseva (Canada) D Nestor	4	6^{4}
6	(Chinese Taipei) H-c Chan (Netherlands) J-J Rojer	6	7^{7}

Second round
(United States) A Spears (Colombia) JS Cabal	4	6	[13]
Alt	(Spain) MJ Martínez Sánchez (Brazil) M Demoliner	6	3	[15]
(Germany) A-L Grönefeld (Colombia) R Farah	6	0
5	(Kazakhstan) Y Shvedova (Austria) A Peya	4	0^{r}
4	(Slovenia) K Srebotnik (South Africa) R Klaasen	2	2
(Czech Republic) L Hradecká (Poland) M Matkowski	6	6
(Australia) C Dellacqua (United States) R Ram	6	3	[10]
6	(Chinese Taipei) H-c Chan (Netherlands) J-J Rojer	3	6	[6]

Quarterfinals
Alt	(Spain) MJ Martínez Sánchez (Brazil) M Demoliner	7	3	[6]
(Germany) A-L Grönefeld (Colombia) R Farah	5	6	[10]
(Czech Republic) L Hradecká (Poland) M Matkowski	1	3
(Australia) C Dellacqua (United States) R Ram	6	6

Semifinals
(Germany) A-L Grönefeld (Colombia) R Farah	6^{5}	6	[10]
(Australia) C Dellacqua (United States) R Ram	7^{7}	3	[5]

=== Bottom half ===
First round
8	(Latvia) J Ostapenko (Brazil) B Soares	2	6^{5}
(Poland) A Rosolska (New Zealand) M Venus	6	7^{7}
(Czech Republic) K Peschke (Pakistan) A-u-H Qureshi	4	2
(Slovenia) A Klepač (United Kingdom) D Inglot	6	6
WC	(France) P Parmentier (France) M Bourgue	3	7	[10]
(Czech Republic) B Krejčíková (United States) N Monroe	6	5	[5]
(United States) R Atawo (Philippines) T Huey	6	2	[7]
3	(Czech Republic) A Hlaváčková (France) É Roger-Vasselin	1	6	[10]
7	(Canada) G Dabrowski (India) R Bopanna	6	6
WC	(Australia) J Moore (Australia) M Reid	0	1
WC	(France) C Paquet (France) B Paire	6	5	[10]
(China) Y Xu (France) F Martin	2	7	[5]
WC	(France) M Georges (France) G Blancaneaux	1	4
(Ukraine) E Svitolina (New Zealand) A Sitak	6	6
(Croatia) D Jurak (Croatia) M Pavić	5	3
2	(India) S Mirza (Croatia) I Dodig	7	6

Second round
(Poland) A Rosolska (New Zealand) M Venus	7^{7}	5	[9]
(Slovenia) A Klepač (United Kingdom) D Inglot	6^{2}	7	[11]
WC	(France) P Parmentier (France) M Bourgue	2	4
3	(Czech Republic) A Hlaváčková (France) É Roger-Vasselin	6	6
7	(Canada) G Dabrowski (India) R Bopanna	6	6
WC	(France) C Paquet (France) B Paire	3	2
(Ukraine) E Svitolina (New Zealand) A Sitak	2	4
2	(India) S Mirza (Croatia) I Dodig	6	6

Quarterfinals
(Slovenia) A Klepač (United Kingdom) D Inglot	6^{3}	3
3	(Czech Republic) A Hlaváčková (France) É Roger-Vasselin	7^{7}	6
7	(Canada) G Dabrowski (India) R Bopanna	6	6
2	(India) S Mirza (Croatia) I Dodig	3	4

Semifinals
3	(Czech Republic) A Hlaváčková (France) É Roger-Vasselin	5	3
7	(Canada) G Dabrowski (India) R Bopanna	7	6
