= 2017 French Open – Men's doubles =

Men's doubles
- 2017 French Open

Final
- Champions: (United States) Ryan Harrison (New Zealand) Michael Venus
- Runners-up: (Mexico) Santiago González (United States) Donald Young
- Score: 7–6^{(7–5)}, 6–7^{(4–7)}, 6–3

Details
- Draw: 64
- Seeds: 16

Events
Singles	men	women		boys	girls
Doubles	men	women	mixed	boys	girls
WC Singles	men	women	quad
WC Doubles	men	women	quad
Legends	−45	45+	women
- French Open

Ryan Harrison and Michael Venus won the men's doubles tennis title at the 2017 French Open, defeating Santiago González and Donald Young in the final, 7–6^{(7–5)}, 6–7^{(4–7)}, 6–3. In a rare coincidence, none of the four players had ever previously appeared in the men's doubles finals of a Grand Slam tournament prior to the event.

Feliciano López and Marc López were the defending champions, but lost to Julio Peralta and Horacio Zeballos in the first round.

Henri Kontinen retained the ATP no. 1 doubles ranking at the end of tournament despite losing in the first round after fellow contenders Nicolas Mahut and Marcelo Melo lost in the first and second rounds, respectively.

== Seeds ==
1. (Finland) Henri Kontinen / (Australia) John Peers (first round)
2. (France) Pierre-Hugues Herbert / (France) Nicolas Mahut (first round)
3. (United States) Bob Bryan / (United States) Mike Bryan (second round)
4. (Poland) Łukasz Kubot / (Brazil) Marcelo Melo (second round)
5. (United Kingdom) Jamie Murray / (Brazil) Bruno Soares (quarterfinals)
6. (Spain) Feliciano López / (Spain) Marc López (first round)
7. (Croatia) Ivan Dodig / (Spain) Marcel Granollers (quarterfinals)
8. (South Africa) Raven Klaasen / (United States) Rajeev Ram (second round)

9. (India) Rohan Bopanna / (Uruguay) Pablo Cuevas (third round)
10. (Spain) Pablo Carreño Busta / (Spain) Guillermo García López (first round, withdrew)
11. (Netherlands) Jean-Julien Rojer / (Romania) Horia Tecău (third round)
12. (Poland) Marcin Matkowski / (France) Édouard Roger-Vasselin (second round)
13. (Romania) Florin Mergea / (Pakistan) Aisam-ul-Haq Qureshi (first round)
14. (France) Fabrice Martin / (Canada) Daniel Nestor (first round)
15. (Austria) Oliver Marach / (Croatia) Mate Pavić (second round)
16. (Colombia) Juan Sebastián Cabal / (Colombia) Robert Farah (semifinals)

Click on the seed number of a player to go to their draw section.

== Draw ==
Key

- Q = Qualifier
- WC = Wild card
- LL = Lucky loser
- Alt = Alternate
- ITF = ITF entry
- PR = Protected ranking
- SR = Special ranking
- SE = Special exempt
- JE = Junior exempt
- JR = Junior Accelerator Programme entrant
- CO = College Accelerator Programme entrant
- NG = Next Gen Accelerator Program entrant
- w/o = Walkover
- r = Retired
- d = Defaulted

=== Finals ===
Quarterfinals
16	(Colombia) Juan Sebastián Cabal (Colombia) Robert Farah	6^{1}	7^{8}	6
(Chile) Julio Peralta (Argentina) Horacio Zeballos	7^{7}	6^{6}	0
(United States) Ryan Harrison (New Zealand) Michael Venus	6	3	6
7	(Croatia) Ivan Dodig (Spain) Marcel Granollers	2	6	3
(Brazil) Rogério Dutra Silva (Italy) Paolo Lorenzi	6^{5}	5
(Spain) Fernando Verdasco (Serbia) Nenad Zimonjić	7^{7}	7
5	(United Kingdom) Jamie Murray (Brazil) Bruno Soares	6	6^{3}	6^{4}
(Mexico) Santiago González (United States) Donald Young	3	7^{7}	7^{7}

Semifinals
16	(Colombia) Juan Sebastián Cabal (Colombia) Robert Farah	6	3	4
(United States) Ryan Harrison (New Zealand) Michael Venus	4	6	6
(Spain) Fernando Verdasco (Serbia) Nenad Zimonjić	7^{7}	5	3
(Mexico) Santiago González (United States) Donald Young	6^{3}	7	6

Final
(United States) Ryan Harrison (New Zealand) Michael Venus	7^{7}	6^{4}	6
(Mexico) Santiago González (United States) Donald Young	6^{5}	7^{7}	3

=== Top half ===
==== Section 1 ====
First round
1	(Finland) H Kontinen (Australia) J Peers	6^{3}	3
PR	(Spain) D Marrero (Spain) T Robredo	7^{7}	6
(United States) S Lipsky (India) L Paes	7^{7}	4	6
Alt	(Moldova) R Albot (South Korea) H Chung	6^{5}	6	2
(United States) E Escobedo (United States) S Querrey	2	7^{9}	6
PR	(Italy) S Bolelli (Italy) F Fognini	6	6^{7}	2
(United States) J Cerretani (Russia) D Medvedev	2	1
16	(Colombia) JS Cabal (Colombia) R Farah	6	6
12	(Poland) M Matkowski (France) É Roger-Vasselin	5	6	6
(United States) N Monroe (New Zealand) A Sitak	7	4	4
(Argentina) A Molteni (Canada) A Shamasdin	6	6
(Argentina) F Bagnis (Spain) A Ramos Viñolas	2	4
(Germany) A Begemann (Austria) P Oswald	6	4	6
Alt	(Georgia (country)) N Basilashvili (Australia) M Reid	4	6	3
(Chile) J Peralta (Argentina) H Zeballos	6	6
6	(Spain) F López (Spain) M López	2	3

Second round
PR	(Spain) D Marrero (Spain) T Robredo	7^{7}	6
(United States) S Lipsky (India) L Paes	6^{3}	2
(United States) E Escobedo (United States) S Querrey	2	4
16	(Colombia) JS Cabal (Colombia) R Farah	6	6
12	(Poland) M Matkowski (France) É Roger-Vasselin	5	6^{7}
(Argentina) A Molteni (Canada) A Shamasdin	7	7^{9}
(Germany) A Begemann (Austria) P Oswald	3	7	5
(Chile) J Peralta (Argentina) H Zeballos	6	5	7

Third round
PR	(Spain) D Marrero (Spain) T Robredo	7^{7}	6^{3}	4
16	(Colombia) JS Cabal (Colombia) R Farah	6^{3}	7^{7}	6
(Argentina) A Molteni (Canada) A Shamasdin	5	2
(Chile) J Peralta (Argentina) H Zeballos	7	6

Quarterfinals
16	(Colombia) JS Cabal (Colombia) R Farah	6^{1}	7^{8}	6
(Chile) J Peralta (Argentina) H Zeballos	7^{7}	6^{6}	0

==== Section 2 ====
First round
4	(Poland) Ł Kubot (Brazil) M Melo	3	6	6
(France) J Benneteau (France) J Chardy	6	2	3
(Argentina) D Schwartzman (United States) F Tiafoe	6	4	4
(United States) R Harrison (New Zealand) M Venus	3	6	6
(Spain) N Almagro (United States) S Johnson	7^{7}	4	0
(India) P Raja (India) D Sharan	6^{5}	6	6
WC	(France) J Eysseric (France) T Lamasine	1	1
15	(Austria) O Marach (Croatia) M Pavić	6	6
11	(Netherlands) J-J Rojer (Romania) H Tecău	6	6
(Brazil) T Bellucci (Argentina) C Berlocq	2	1
WC	(France) C Lestienne (France) C Moutet	4
(Germany) D Brown (Chinese Taipei) Y-h Lu	2^{r}
(Netherlands) W Koolhof (Netherlands) M Middelkoop	6^{2}	7^{7}	4
(Tunisia) M Jaziri (Italy) A Seppi	7^{7}	6^{5}	6
(New Zealand) M Daniell (Brazil) M Demoliner	4	4
7	(Croatia) I Dodig (Spain) M Granollers	6	6

Second round
4	(Poland) Ł Kubot (Brazil) M Melo	4	7^{7}	3
(United States) R Harrison (New Zealand) M Venus	6	6^{5}	6
(India) P Raja (India) D Sharan	6	3	6
15	(Austria) O Marach (Croatia) M Pavić	4	6	4
11	(Netherlands) J-J Rojer (Romania) H Tecău	6	6
WC	(France) C Lestienne (France) C Moutet	1	1
(Tunisia) M Jaziri (Italy) A Seppi	1	2
7	(Croatia) I Dodig (Spain) M Granollers	6	6

Third round
(United States) R Harrison (New Zealand) M Venus	4	7^{7}	6
(India) P Raja (India) D Sharan	6	6^{5}	2
11	(Netherlands) J-J Rojer (Romania) H Tecău	3	7	3
7	(Croatia) I Dodig (Spain) M Granollers	6	5	6

Quarterfinals
(United States) R Harrison (New Zealand) M Venus	6	3	6
7	(Croatia) I Dodig (Spain) M Granollers	2	6	3

=== Bottom half ===
==== Section 3 ====
First round
8	(South Africa) R Klaasen (United States) R Ram	7^{7}	6
WC	(France) K de Schepper (France) V Millot	6^{5}	2
(Czech Republic) R Jebavý (Czech Republic) J Veselý	7	6
WC	(France) G Barrère (France) A Olivetti	5	4
WC	(France) Q Halys (France) A Mannarino	4	6	6
(Belarus) M Mirnyi (Russia) M Youzhny	6	3	2
(Brazil) R Dutra Silva (Italy) P Lorenzi	w/o
10	(Spain) P Carreño Busta (Spain) G García López
13	(Romania) F Mergea (Pakistan) A-u-H Qureshi	3	6^{2}
(Spain) F Verdasco (Serbia) N Zimonjić	6	7^{7}
(Dominican Republic) V Estrella Burgos (Australia) B Tomic	2^{r}
(Austria) J Knowle (Germany) F Mayer	1
(United States) B Baker (Croatia) N Mektić	3	6	6^{3}
(Australia) S Groth (Sweden) R Lindstedt	6	3	7^{7}
(Germany) P Petzschner (Austria) A Peya	5	3
3	(United States) B Bryan (United States) M Bryan	7	6

Second round
8	(South Africa) R Klaasen (United States) R Ram	5	4
(Czech Republic) R Jebavý (Czech Republic) J Veselý	7	6
WC	(France) Q Halys (France) A Mannarino	5	6	5
(Brazil) R Dutra Silva (Italy) P Lorenzi	7	2	7
(Spain) F Verdasco (Serbia) N Zimonjić	6	2	6
(Austria) J Knowle (Germany) F Mayer	2	6	2
(Australia) S Groth (Sweden) R Lindstedt	7^{7}	6
3	(United States) B Bryan (United States) M Bryan	6^{4}	3

Third round
(Czech Republic) R Jebavý (Czech Republic) J Veselý	4	2
(Brazil) R Dutra Silva (Italy) P Lorenzi	6	6
(Spain) F Verdasco (Serbia) N Zimonjić	6	6
(Australia) S Groth (Sweden) R Lindstedt	2	4

Quarterfinals
(Brazil) R Dutra Silva (Italy) P Lorenzi	6^{5}	5
(Spain) F Verdasco (Serbia) N Zimonjić	7^{7}	7

==== Section 4 ====
First round
5	(United Kingdom) J Murray (Brazil) B Soares	6	7^{7}
(Serbia) J Tipsarević (Serbia) V Troicki	3	6^{0}
(Belgium) S Darcis (France) B Paire	2	3
(Russia) M Elgin (Russia) K Khachanov	6	6
(Philippines) T Huey (Uzbekistan) D Istomin	7^{12}	3	6
(Netherlands) R Haase (United Kingdom) D Inglot	6^{10}	6	3
WC	(France) M Bourgue (France) P-H Mathieu	1	1
9	(India) R Bopanna (Uruguay) P Cuevas	6	6
14	(France) F Martin (Canada) D Nestor	6^{4}	7^{7}	3
(Mexico) S González (United States) D Young	7^{7}	6^{4}	6
(Israel) J Erlich (Brazil) A Sá	6	7
(Slovakia) M Kližan (Portugal) J Sousa	3	5
(Germany) J-L Struff (Germany) M Zverev	3	6	6
WC	(France) G Jacq (France) H Nys	6	3	4
(Australia) N Kyrgios (Australia) J Thompson	7^{10}	4	6
2	(France) P-H Herbert (France) N Mahut	6^{8}	6	3

Second round
5	(United Kingdom) J Murray (Brazil) B Soares	6	7^{7}
(Russia) M Elgin (Russia) K Khachanov	1	6^{2}
(Philippines) T Huey (Uzbekistan) D Istomin	7	6^{4}	4
9	(India) R Bopanna (Uruguay) P Cuevas	5	7^{7}	6
(Mexico) S González (United States) D Young	6	7^{7}
(Israel) J Erlich (Brazil) A Sá	3	6^{5}
(Germany) J-L Struff (Germany) M Zverev	4	7^{7}	6^{5}
(Australia) N Kyrgios (Australia) J Thompson	6	6^{3}	7^{7}

Third round
5	(United Kingdom) J Murray (Brazil) B Soares	7^{7}	6
9	(India) R Bopanna (Uruguay) P Cuevas	6^{5}	2
(Mexico) S González (United States) D Young	6	6
(Australia) N Kyrgios (Australia) J Thompson	4	4

Quarterfinals
5	(United Kingdom) J Murray (Brazil) B Soares	6	6^{3}	6^{4}
(Mexico) S González (United States) D Young	3	7^{7}	7^{7}
