= 2017 French Open – Legends over 45 doubles =

Legends over 45 doubles
- 2017 French Open

Final
- Champions: (France) Mansour Bahrami (France) Fabrice Santoro
- Runners-up: (Australia) Pat Cash (United States) Michael Chang
- Score: 7–6^{(7–3)}, 6–3

Events
Singles	men	women		boys	girls
Doubles	men	women	mixed	boys	girls
WC Singles	men	women	quad
WC Doubles	men	women	quad
Legends	−45	45+	women
← 2016 ·	French Open	· 2018 →

Sergi Bruguera and Goran Ivanišević were the defending champions, but were eliminated in the round-robin competition.

Mansour Bahrami and Fabrice Santoro won the title, defeating Pat Cash and Michael Chang in the final, 7–6^{(7–3)}, 6–3.

== Draw ==
=== Key ===
- Q = Qualifier
- WC = Wild card
- LL = Lucky loser
- Alt = Alternate
- ITF = ITF entry
- PR = Protected ranking
- SR = Special ranking
- SE = Special exempt
- JE = Junior exempt
- JR = Junior Accelerator Programme entrant
- CO = College Accelerator Programme entrant
- NG = Next Gen Accelerator Program entrant
- w/o = Walkover
- r = Retired
- d = Defaulted

=== Final ===
Finals
C2	(Australia) Pat Cash (United States) Michael Chang	6^{3}	3
D3	(France) Mansour Bahrami (France) Fabrice Santoro	7^{7}	6

=== Group C ===
		(Spain) S Bruguera (Croatia) G Ivanišević	(Australia) P Cash (United States) M Chang	(United States) J McEnroe (France) C Pioline	RR; W–L	Set; W–L	Game; W–L	Standings
C1	(Spain) Sergi Bruguera (Croatia) Goran Ivanišević		7–6^{(7–2)}, 2–6, [10–4]	6–3, 3–6, [7–10]	1–1	3–3	19–22	2
C2	(Australia) Pat Cash (United States) Michael Chang	6–7^{(2–7)}, 6–2, [4–10]		6–4, 6–3	1–1	3–2	24–17	1
C3	(United States) John McEnroe (France) Cédric Pioline	3–6, 6–3, [10–7]	4–6, 3–6		1–1	2–3	17–21	3

Standings are determined by: 1. number of wins; 2. number of matches; 3. in three-players-ties, percentage of sets won, or of games won; 4. steering-committee decision.

=== Group D ===
		(France) A Boetsch (France) H Leconte	(Sweden) M Pernfors (Australia) M Woodforde	(France) M Bahrami (France) F Santoro	RR; W–L	Set; W–L	Game; W–L	Standings
D1	(France) Arnaud Boetsch (France) Henri Leconte		2–6, 4–6	4–6, 3–6	0–2	0–4	13–24	3
D2	(Sweden) Mikael Pernfors (Australia) Mark Woodforde	6–2, 6–4		3–6, 4–6	1–1	2–2	19–18	2
D3	(France) Mansour Bahrami (France) Fabrice Santoro	6–4, 6–3	6–3, 6–4		2–0	4–0	24–14	1

Standings are determined by: 1. number of wins; 2. number of matches; 3. in three-players-ties, percentage of sets won, or of games won; 4. steering-committee decision.
