= 2017 French Open – Legends under 45 doubles =

Legends under 45 doubles
- 2017 French Open

Final
- Champions: (France) Sébastien Grosjean (France) Michaël Llodra
- Runners-up: (Netherlands) Paul Haarhuis (Ukraine) Andriy Medvedev
- Score: 6–4, 3–6, [10–8]

Events
Singles	men	women		boys	girls
Doubles	men	women	mixed	boys	girls
WC Singles	men	women	quad
WC Doubles	men	women	quad
Legends	−45	45+	women
← 2016 ·	French Open	· 2018 →

Carlos Moyá and Juan Carlos Ferrero were the defending champions, but were eliminated in the round-robin competition.

Sébastien Grosjean and Michaël Llodra won the title, defeating Paul Haarhuis and Andriy Medvedev in the final, 6–4, 3–6, [10–8].

== Draw ==
=== Key ===
- Q = Qualifier
- WC = Wild card
- LL = Lucky loser
- Alt = Alternate
- ITF = ITF entry
- PR = Protected ranking
- SR = Special ranking
- SE = Special exempt
- JE = Junior exempt
- JR = Junior Accelerator Programme entrant
- CO = College Accelerator Programme entrant
- NG = Next Gen Accelerator Program entrant
- w/o = Walkover
- r = Retired
- d = Defaulted

=== Final ===
Finals
A2	(Netherlands) Paul Haarhuis (Ukraine) Andriy Medvedev	4	6	[8]
B2	(France) Sébastien Grosjean (France) Michaël Llodra	6	3	[10]

=== Group A ===
		(France) A Clément (France) N Escudé	(Netherlands) P Haarhuis (Ukraine) A Medvedev	(Sweden) T Enqvist (Sweden) M Norman	RR; W–L	Set; W–L	Game; W–L	Standings
A1	(France) Arnaud Clément (France) Nicolas Escudé		2–6, 5–7	6–4, 7–6^{(7–4)}	1–1	2–2	20–23	2
A2	(Netherlands) Paul Haarhuis (Ukraine) Andriy Medvedev	6–2, 7–5		6–3, 6–7^{(6–8)}, [10–8]	2–0	4–1	26–17	1
A3	(Sweden) Thomas Enqvist (Sweden) Magnus Norman	4–6, 6–7^{(4–7)}	3–6, 7–6^{(8–6)}, [8–10]		0–2	1–4	20–26	3

Standings are determined by: 1. number of wins; 2. number of matches; 3. in three-players-ties, percentage of sets won, or of games won; 4. steering-committee decision.

=== Group B ===
		(Spain) C Moyá (Spain) JC Ferrero	(France) S Grosjean (France) M Llodra	(Spain) À Corretja (Argentina) G Gaudio	RR; W–L	Set; W–L	Game; W–L	Standings
B1	(Spain) Carlos Moyá (Spain) Juan Carlos Ferrero		4–6, 7–5, [10–8]	not played	1–0	2–1	12–11	2
B2	(France) Sébastien Grosjean (France) Michaël Llodra	6–4, 5–7, [8–10]		6–2, 2–6, [10–7]	1–1	3–3	20–20	1
B3	(Spain) Àlex Corretja (Argentina) Gastón Gaudio	not played	2–6, 6–2, [7–10]		0–1	1–2	8–9	3

Standings are determined by: 1. number of wins; 2. number of matches; 3. in three-players-ties, percentage of sets won, or of games won; 4. steering-committee decision.
