= 2017 French Open – Women's legends doubles =

Women's legends doubles
- 2017 French Open

Final
- Champions: (United States) Tracy Austin (Belgium) Kim Clijsters
- Runners-up: (United States) Lindsay Davenport (United States) Martina Navratilova
- Score: 6–3, 3–6, [10–5]

Events
| Singles | men | women | | boys | girls |
| Doubles | men | women | mixed | boys | girls |
| WC Singles | men | women | quad |
| WC Doubles | men | women | quad |
| Legends | −45 | 45+ | women |
| ← 2016 · | French Open | · 2018 → |

Lindsay Davenport and Martina Navratilova were the defending champions, but lost to Tracy Austin and Kim Clijsters in the final, 3–6, 6–3, [5–10].

== Draw ==
=== Key ===
- Q = Qualifier
- WC = Wild card
- LL = Lucky loser
- Alt = Alternate
- ITF = ITF entry
- PR = Protected ranking
- SR = Special ranking
- SE = Special exempt
- JE = Junior exempt
- JR = Junior Accelerator Programme entrant
- CO = College Accelerator Programme entrant
- NG = Next Gen Accelerator Program entrant
- w/o = Walkover
- r = Retired
- d = Defaulted

=== Final ===
| Finals |
| A1 | (United States) Lindsay Davenport (United States) Martina Navratilova | 3 | 6 | [5] |
| B1 | (United States) Tracy Austin (Belgium) Kim Clijsters | 6 | 3 | [10] |

=== Group A ===
| | | (United States) L Davenport (United States) M Navratilova | (Russia) A Myskina (France) N Tauziat | (Spain) A Sánchez Vicario (France) S Testud | RR; W–L | Set; W–L | Game; W–L | Standings |
| A1 | (United States) Lindsay Davenport (United States) Martina Navratilova | | 5–7, 6–0, [10–4] | 4–6, 6–3, [8–10] | 1–1 | 3–3 | 22–17 | 1 |
| A2 | (Russia) Anastasia Myskina (France) Nathalie Tauziat | 7–5, 0–6, [4–10] | | 2–6, 6–3, [10–6] | 1–1 | 3–3 | 16–21 | 3 |
| A3 | (Spain) Arantxa Sánchez Vicario (France) Sandrine Testud | 6–4, 3–6, [10–8] | 6–2, 3–6, [6–10] | | 1–1 | 3–3 | 19–19 | 2 |

Standings are determined by: 1. number of wins; 2. number of matches; 3. in three-players-ties, percentage of sets won, or of games won; 4. steering-committee decision.

=== Group B ===
| | | (United States) T Austin (Belgium) K Clijsters | (France) M Bartoli (Croatia) I Majoli | (Spain) C Martínez (United States) C Rubin | RR; W–L | Set; W–L | Game; W–L | Standings |
| B1 | (United States) Tracy Austin (Belgium) Kim Clijsters | | 4–6, 6–0, [10–6] | 4–1, ret. | 2–0 | 3–1 | 15–7 | 1 |
| B2 | (France) Marion Bartoli (Croatia) Iva Majoli | 6–4, 0–6, [6–10] | | 7–6^{(7–5)}, 6–4 | 1–1 | 3–2 | 19–21 | 2 |
| B3 | (Spain) Conchita Martínez (United States) Chanda Rubin | 1–4, ret. | 6–7^{(5–7)}, 4–6 | | 0–2 | 0–3 | 11–17 | 3 |

Standings are determined by: 1. number of wins; 2. number of matches; 3. in three-players-ties, percentage of sets won, or of games won; 4. steering-committee decision.
