= 2017 French Open – Women's singles =

Women's singles
- 2017 French Open

Final
- Champion: (Latvia) Jeļena Ostapenko
- Runner-up: (Romania) Simona Halep
- Score: 4–6, 6–4, 6–3

Details
- Draw: 128 (12 Q / 8 WC )
- Seeds: 32

Events
Singles	men	women		boys	girls
Doubles	men	women	mixed	boys	girls
WC Singles	men	women	quad
WC Doubles	men	women	quad
Legends	−45	45+	women
← 2016 ·	French Open	· 2018 →

Jeļena Ostapenko defeated Simona Halep in the final, 4–6, 6–4, 6–3 to win the women's singles tennis title at the 2017 French Open. It was her first major title, and her first WTA Tour-level singles title overall. Ostapenko was the first Latvian to win a singles major, the youngest woman to win the French Open since Iva Majoli in 1997, and the first woman since Barbara Jordan at the 1979 Australian Open to win a major as her first tour-level singles title. Ostapenko was the first unseeded player to win a major since Kim Clijsters in the 2009 US Open. She was also the first unseeded player to win the event since Margaret Scriven in 1933, and the lowest-ranked to do so (world No. 47) since the computerized rankings began in 1975.

Garbiñe Muguruza was the defending champion, but was defeated in the fourth round by Kristina Mladenovic.

With the losses of Muguruza, Venus Williams, Samantha Stosur and Svetlana Kuznetsova in the fourth round, a first-time major champion was guaranteed. This marked the first French Open since 1977, and the first major since the 1979 Australian Open, not to feature a former major champion in the quarterfinals.

Angelique Kerber retained the world No. 1 ranking after Halep lost in the final, even though she lost in the first round. Kerber's loss marked the first time that the top seed lost in the first round of a major since the 2001 Wimbledon Championships.

This was the first French Open since 2011 to feature neither Maria Sharapova nor Serena Williams in the final. Williams was absent due to pregnancy, and Sharapova did not qualify based on her ranking.

This was the first major appearance for future Wimbledon champion and French Open finalist Markéta Vondroušová; she was defeated in the second round by Daria Kasatkina.

== Seeds ==
1. (Germany) Angelique Kerber (first round)
2. (Czech Republic) Karolína Plíšková (semifinals)
3. (Romania) Simona Halep (final)
4. (Spain) Garbiñe Muguruza (fourth round)
5. (Ukraine) Elina Svitolina (quarterfinals)
6. (Slovakia) Dominika Cibulková (second round)
7. (United Kingdom) Johanna Konta (first round)
8. (Russia) Svetlana Kuznetsova (fourth round)
9. (Poland) Agnieszka Radwańska (third round)
10. (United States) Venus Williams (fourth round)
11. (Denmark) Caroline Wozniacki (quarterfinals)
12. (United States) Madison Keys (second round)
13. (France) Kristina Mladenovic (quarterfinals)
14. (Russia) Elena Vesnina (third round)
15. (Czech Republic) Petra Kvitová (second round)
16. (Russia) Anastasia Pavlyuchenkova (second round)

17. (Latvia) Anastasija Sevastova (third round)
18. (Netherlands) Kiki Bertens (second round)
19. (United States) CoCo Vandeweghe (first round)
20. (Czech Republic) Barbora Strýcová (second round)
21. (Spain) Carla Suárez Navarro (fourth round)
22. (Croatia) Mirjana Lučić-Baroni (first round)
23. (Australia) Samantha Stosur (fourth round)
24. (Australia) Daria Gavrilova (first round)
25. (United States) Lauren Davis (first round)
26. (Russia) Daria Kasatkina (third round)
27. (Kazakhstan) Yulia Putintseva (third round)
28. (France) Caroline Garcia (quarterfinals)
29. (Croatia) Ana Konjuh (second round)
30. (Switzerland) Timea Bacsinszky (semifinals)
31. (Italy) Roberta Vinci (first round)
32. (China) Zhang Shuai (third round)

Click on the seed number of a player to go to their draw section.

== Draw ==
=== Key ===
- Q = Qualifier
- WC = Wild card
- LL = Lucky loser
- Alt = Alternate
- ITF = ITF entry
- PR = Protected ranking
- SR = Special ranking
- SE = Special exempt
- JE = Junior exempt
- JR = Junior Accelerator Programme entrant
- CO = College Accelerator Programme entrant
- NG = Next Gen Accelerator Program entrant
- w/o = Walkover
- r = Retired
- d = Defaulted

=== Finals ===
Quarterfinals
(Latvia) Jeļena Ostapenko	4	6	6
11	(Denmark) Caroline Wozniacki	6	2	2
13	(France) Kristina Mladenovic	4	4
30	(Switzerland) Timea Bacsinszky	6	6
5	(Ukraine) Elina Svitolina	6	6^{6}	0
3	(Romania) Simona Halep	3	7^{8}	6
28	(France) Caroline Garcia	6^{3}	4
2	(Czech Republic) Karolína Plíšková	7^{7}	6

Semifinals
(Latvia) Jeļena Ostapenko	7^{7}	3	6
30	(Switzerland) Timea Bacsinszky	6^{4}	6	3
3	(Romania) Simona Halep	6	3	6
2	(Czech Republic) Karolína Plíšková	4	6	3

Final
(Latvia) Jeļena Ostapenko	4	6	6
3	(Romania) Simona Halep	6	4	3

=== Top half ===
==== Section 1 ====
First round
1	(Germany) A Kerber	2	2
(Russia) E Makarova	6	6
(Ukraine) L Tsurenko	6	6
Q	(Ukraine) K Kozlova	4	0
(United States) L Chirico	6	3	2
(Latvia) J Ostapenko	4	6	6
(Puerto Rico) M Puig	6	3	6
31	(Italy) R Vinci	3	6	2
23	(Australia) S Stosur	7	6
(Slovakia) K Kučová	5	1
(Belgium) K Flipkens	6	6
(Luxembourg) M Minella	3	3
Q	(United States) B Mattek-Sands	7	6
(Russia) E Rodina	5	2
(United States) J Boserup	3	2
15	(Czech Republic) P Kvitová	6	6

Second round
(Russia) E Makarova	2	2
(Ukraine) L Tsurenko	6	6
(Latvia) J Ostapenko	6	6
(Puerto Rico) M Puig	3	2
23	(Australia) S Stosur	6	7^{8}
(Belgium) K Flipkens	2	6^{6}
Q	(United States) B Mattek-Sands	7^{7}	7^{7}
15	(Czech Republic) P Kvitová	6^{5}	6^{5}

Third round
(Ukraine) L Tsurenko	1	4
(Latvia) J Ostapenko	6	6
23	(Australia) S Stosur	6	6
Q	(United States) B Mattek-Sands	2	2

Fourth round
(Latvia) J Ostapenko	2	6	6
23	(Australia) S Stosur	6	2	4

==== Section 2 ====
First round
11	(Denmark) C Wozniacki	6	3	6
WC	(Australia) J Fourlis	4	6	2
Q	(Canada) F Abanda	6	6
WC	(France) T Andrianjafitrimo	3	4
(United States) C Bellis	6	3	6
Q	(Netherlands) Q Lemoine	3	6	1
PR	(Australia) A Tomljanović	6	1	1
18	(Netherlands) K Bertens	4	6	6
32	(China) S Zhang	7	6
(Croatia) D Vekić	5	4
(Switzerland) V Golubic	6	5	3
(Belarus) A Sasnovich	4	7	6
(Italy) C Giorgi	2	3
(France) O Dodin	6	6
(United States) C McHale	5	4
8	(Russia) S Kuznetsova	7	6

Second round
11	(Denmark) C Wozniacki	6	6
Q	(Canada) F Abanda	0	0
(United States) C Bellis	6	7^{7}
18	(Netherlands) K Bertens	3	6^{5}
32	(China) S Zhang	6	4	6
(Belarus) A Sasnovich	2	6	3
(France) O Dodin	6^{5}	7	3
8	(Russia) S Kuznetsova	7^{7}	5	6

Third round
11	(Denmark) C Wozniacki	6	2	6
(United States) C Bellis	2	6	3
32	(China) S Zhang	6^{5}	6	5
8	(Russia) S Kuznetsova	7^{7}	4	7

Fourth round
11	(Denmark) C Wozniacki	6	4	6
8	(Russia) S Kuznetsova	1	6	2

==== Section 3 ====
First round
4	(Spain) G Muguruza	6	6
(Italy) F Schiavone	2	4
(Estonia) A Kontaveit	7	6
(Romania) M Niculescu	5	1
(Sweden) J Larsson	6	6
(Russia) N Vikhlyantseva	4	4
WC	(France) M Georges	3	0
27	(Kazakhstan) Y Putintseva	6	6
22	(Croatia) M Lučić-Baroni	3	3
(Turkey) Ç Büyükakçay	6	6
(New Zealand) M Erakovic	6^{4}	4
(United States) S Rogers	7^{7}	6
Q	(Italy) S Errani	7^{9}	6
(Japan) M Doi	6^{7}	1
(United States) J Brady	6	3	7
13	(France) K Mladenovic	3	6	9

Second round
4	(Spain) G Muguruza	6^{4}	6	6
(Estonia) A Kontaveit	7^{7}	4	2
(Sweden) J Larsson	3	6	3
27	(Kazakhstan) Y Putintseva	6	1	6
(Turkey) Ç Büyükakçay	6^{6}	4
(United States) S Rogers	7^{8}	6
Q	(Italy) S Errani	2	3
13	(France) K Mladenovic	6	6

Third round
4	(Spain) G Muguruza	7	6
27	(Kazakhstan) Y Putintseva	5	2
(United States) S Rogers	5	6	6
13	(France) K Mladenovic	7	4	8

Fourth round
4	(Spain) G Muguruza	1	6	3
13	(France) K Mladenovic	6	3	6

==== Section 4 ====
First round
10	(United States) V Williams	6	7^{7}
(China) Q Wang	4	6^{3}
WC	(United States) A Anisimova	6	5	4
(Japan) K Nara	3	7	6
(Serbia) J Janković	2	5
Q	(Netherlands) R Hogenkamp	6	7
(Belgium) E Mertens	7^{7}	1	6
24	(Australia) D Gavrilova	6^{4}	6	4
30	(Switzerland) T Bacsinszky	6	6
(Spain) S Sorribes Tormo	1	2
(United States) M Brengle	1	6	13
(Germany) J Görges	6	3	11
LL	(Tunisia) O Jabeur	6	6
Q	(Romania) A Bogdan	3	4
(Spain) L Arruabarrena	2	1
6	(Slovakia) D Cibulková	6	6

Second round
10	(United States) V Williams	6	6
(Japan) K Nara	3	1
Q	(Netherlands) R Hogenkamp	3	4
(Belgium) E Mertens	6	6
30	(Switzerland) T Bacsinszky	6	6
(United States) M Brengle	0	2
LL	(Tunisia) O Jabeur	6	6
6	(Slovakia) D Cibulková	4	3

Third round
10	(United States) V Williams	6	6
(Belgium) E Mertens	3	1
30	(Switzerland) T Bacsinszky	6	6
LL	(Tunisia) O Jabeur	2	2

Fourth round
10	(United States) V Williams	7	2	1
30	(Switzerland) T Bacsinszky	5	6	6

=== Bottom half ===
==== Section 5 ====
First round
5	(Ukraine) E Svitolina	6	6
(Kazakhstan) Y Shvedova	4	3
(Germany) M Barthel	0	4
(Bulgaria) T Pironkova	6	6
WC	(France) A Lim	0	5
(Poland) M Linette	6	7
(Montenegro) D Kovinić	5	6^{4}
29	(Croatia) A Konjuh	7	7^{7}
17	(Latvia) A Sevastova	6	6
(Germany) A Beck	2	4
(Japan) R Ozaki	6	3	2
(Canada) E Bouchard	2	6	6
(Ukraine) K Bondarenko	2	5
Q	(Croatia) P Martić	6	7
(Australia) A Barty	3	2
12	(United States) M Keys	6	6

Second round
5	(Ukraine) E Svitolina	3	6	6
(Bulgaria) T Pironkova	6	3	2
(Poland) M Linette	6	7
29	(Croatia) A Konjuh	0	5
17	(Latvia) A Sevastova	6	6
(Canada) E Bouchard	3	0
Q	(Croatia) P Martić	3	6	6
12	(United States) M Keys	6	3	1

Third round
5	(Ukraine) E Svitolina	6	7
(Poland) M Linette	4	5
17	(Latvia) A Sevastova	1	1
Q	(Croatia) P Martić	6	6

Fourth round
5	(Ukraine) E Svitolina	4	6	7
Q	(Croatia) P Martić	6	3	5

==== Section 6 ====
First round
14	(Russia) E Vesnina	6	3	6
Q	(Brazil) B Haddad Maia	2	6	4
(United States) V Lepchenko	6	3	6
(Germany) A Petkovic	4	6	3
(Romania) S Cîrstea	6	6
(China) S Peng	3	1
(Greece) M Sakkari	4	2
21	(Spain) C Suárez Navarro	6	6
26	(Russia) D Kasatkina	7	6
(Belgium) Y Wickmayer	5	4
Q	(Czech Republic) M Vondroušová	6	6
WC	(France) A Hesse	1	0
(China) Y Duan	4	1
(Germany) T Maria	6	6
(Slovakia) J Čepelová	2	3
3	(Romania) S Halep	6	6

Second round
14	(Russia) E Vesnina	4	6	6
(United States) V Lepchenko	6	3	0
(Romania) S Cîrstea	5	4
21	(Spain) C Suárez Navarro	7	6
26	(Russia) D Kasatkina	7^{7}	6
Q	(Czech Republic) M Vondroušová	6^{1}	4
(Germany) T Maria	4	3
3	(Romania) S Halep	6	6

Third round
14	(Russia) E Vesnina	4	4
21	(Spain) C Suárez Navarro	6	6
26	(Russia) D Kasatkina	0	5
3	(Romania) S Halep	6	7

Fourth round
21	(Spain) C Suárez Navarro	1	1
3	(Romania) S Halep	6	6

==== Section 7 ====
First round
7	(United Kingdom) J Konta	6	6^{2}	4
(Chinese Taipei) S-w Hsieh	1	7^{7}	6
Q	(Japan) M Kato	4	0
(United States) T Townsend	6	6
WC	(France) C Paquet	6^{4}	6	6
(Czech Republic) Kr Plíšková	7^{7}	2	2
(Japan) N Hibino	2	2
28	(France) C Garcia	6	6
20	(Czech Republic) B Strýcová	6	6
(United States) A Riske	3	0
(France) A Cornet	6	6^{5}	6
(Hungary) T Babos	2	7^{7}	2
(Japan) N Osaka	3	5
Q	(Belgium) A Van Uytvanck	6	7
WC	(France) F Ferro	1	1
9	(Poland) A Radwańska	6	6

Second round
(Chinese Taipei) S-w Hsieh	6	2	6
(United States) T Townsend	0	6	3
WC	(France) C Paquet	5	4
28	(France) C Garcia	7	6
20	(Czech Republic) B Strýcová	4	1
(France) A Cornet	6	6
Q	(Belgium) A Van Uytvanck	7^{7}	2	3
9	(Poland) A Radwańska	6^{3}	6	6

Third round
(Chinese Taipei) S-w Hsieh	4	6	7
28	(France) C Garcia	6	4	9
(France) A Cornet	6	6
9	(Poland) A Radwańska	2	1

Fourth round
28	(France) C Garcia	6	6
(France) A Cornet	2	4

==== Section 8 ====
First round
16	(Russia) A Pavlyuchenkova	6	1
(Romania) PM Țig	1	0^{r}
(Paraguay) V Cepede Royg	6	6
(Czech Republic) L Šafářová	1	4
(Colombia) M Duque Mariño	7^{7}	6
(Romania) I-C Begu	6^{2}	4
PR	(Slovakia) M Rybáriková	6	6
19	(United States) C Vandeweghe	1	4
25	(United States) L Davis	6	3	3
(Germany) C Witthöft	2	6	6
(Russia) I Khromacheva	3	0
(France) P Parmentier	6	6
(Russia) E Alexandrova	6	2	6
(Czech Republic) K Siniaková	4	6	2
(China) S Zheng	5	2
2	(Czech Republic) Ka Plíšková	7	6

Second round
16	(Russia) A Pavlyuchenkova	6^{4}	6	4
(Paraguay) V Cepede Royg	7^{7}	2	6
(Colombia) M Duque Mariño	1	6	8
PR	(Slovakia) M Rybáriková	6	3	6
(Germany) C Witthöft	6	7^{7}
(France) P Parmentier	4	6^{5}
(Russia) E Alexandrova	2	6	3
2	(Czech Republic) Ka Plíšková	6	4	6

Third round
(Paraguay) V Cepede Royg	3	7^{7}	6
(Colombia) M Duque Mariño	6	6^{2}	3
(Germany) C Witthöft	5	1
2	(Czech Republic) Ka Plíšková	7	6

Fourth round
(Paraguay) V Cepede Royg	6	3	4
2	(Czech Republic) Ka Plíšková	2	6	6

== Seeded players ==
The following are the seeded players. Seedings are based on 22 May 2017. Rank and points before are as of 29 May 2017.

Because the tournament takes place one week later than in 2016, points defending includes results from both the 2016 French Open and tournaments from the week of 6 June 2016 (Nottingham and 's-Hertogenbosch).

Seed	Rank	Player	Points before	Points defending	Points won	Points after	Status
1	1	(Germany) Angelique Kerber	7,035	10	10	7,035	First round lost to (Russia) Ekaterina Makarova
2	3	(Czech Republic) Karolína Plíšková	6,100	10+280	780+100	6,690	Semifinals lost to (Romania) Simona Halep [3]
3	4	(Romania) Simona Halep	5,790	240	1,300	6,850	Runner-up, lost to (Latvia) Jeļena Ostapenko
4	5	(Spain) Garbiñe Muguruza	4,636	2,000	240	2,876	Fourth round lost to (France) Kristina Mladenovic [13]
5	6	(Ukraine) Elina Svitolina	4,575	240	430	4,765	Quarterfinals lost to (Romania) Simona Halep [3]
6	7	(Slovakia) Dominika Cibulková	4,480	130	70	4,420	Second round lost to (Tunisia) Ons Jabeur [LL]
7	8	(United Kingdom) Johanna Konta	4,330	10	10	4,330	First round lost to (Chinese Taipei) Hsieh Su-wei
8	9	(Russia) Svetlana Kuznetsova	4,310	240	240	4,310	Fourth round lost to (Denmark) Caroline Wozniacki [11]
9	10	(Poland) Agnieszka Radwańska	4,095	240	130	3,985	Third round lost to (France) Alizé Cornet
10	11	(United States) Venus Williams	3,941	240	240	3,941	Fourth round lost to (Switzerland) Timea Bacsinszky [30]
11	12	(Denmark) Caroline Wozniacki	3,915	0	430	4,345	Quarterfinals lost to (Latvia) Jeļena Ostapenko
12	13	(United States) Madison Keys	3,163	240	70	2,993	Second round lost to (Croatia) Petra Martić [Q]
13	14	(France) Kristina Mladenovic	2,915	130+180	430+60	3,095	Quarterfinals lost to (Switzerland) Timea Bacsinszky [30]
14	15	(Russia) Elena Vesnina	2,816	70	130	2,876	Third round lost to (Spain) Carla Suárez Navarro [21]
15	16	(Czech Republic) Petra Kvitová	2,780	130	70	2,720	Second round lost to (United States) Bethanie Mattek-Sands [Q]
16	17	(Russia) Anastasia Pavlyuchenkova	2,640	130	70	2,580	Second round lost to (Paraguay) Verónica Cepede Royg
17	19	(Latvia) Anastasija Sevastova	2,165	70	130	2,225	Third round lost to (Croatia) Petra Martić [Q]
18	18	(Netherlands) Kiki Bertens	2,395	780	70	1,685	Second round lost to (United States) Catherine Bellis
19	20	(United States) CoCo Vandeweghe	2,082	70+280	10+1	1,743	First round lost to (Slovakia) Magdaléna Rybáriková [PR]
20	21	(Czech Republic) Barbora Strýcová	2,050	130	70	1,990	Second round lost to (France) Alizé Cornet
21	23	(Spain) Carla Suárez Navarro	1,800	240	240	1,800	Fourth round lost to (Romania) Simona Halep [3]
22	25	(Croatia) Mirjana Lučić-Baroni	1,746	70	10	1,686	First round lost to (Turkey) Çağla Büyükakçay
23	22	(Australia) Samantha Stosur	1,945	780	240	1,405	Fourth round lost to (Latvia) Jeļena Ostapenko
24	24	(Australia) Daria Gavrilova	1,755	10	10	1,755	First round lost to (Belgium) Elise Mertens
25	26	(United States) Lauren Davis	1,611	10	10	1,611	First round lost to (Germany) Carina Witthöft
26	28	(Russia) Daria Kasatkina	1,580	130	130	1,580	Third round lost to (Romania) Simona Halep [3]
27	29	(Kazakhstan) Yulia Putintseva	1,550	430	130	1,250	Third round lost to (Spain) Garbiñe Muguruza [4]
28	27	(France) Caroline Garcia	1,595	70	430	1,955	Quarterfinals lost to (Czech Republic) Karolína Plíšková [2]
29	30	(Croatia) Ana Konjuh	1,527	70+57	70+20	1,490	Second round lost to (Poland) Magda Linette
30	31	(Switzerland) Timea Bacsinszky	1,523	430	780	1,873	Semifinals lost to (Latvia) Jeļena Ostapenko
31	33	(Italy) Roberta Vinci	1,490	10	10	1,490	First round lost to (Puerto Rico) Monica Puig
32	34	(China) Zhang Shuai	1,490	70	130	1,550	Third round lost to (Russia) Svetlana Kuznetsova [8]

=== Withdrawn players ===
The following players would have been seeded, but they withdrew from the event.

Rank	Player	Points Before	Points defending	Points after	Withdrawal reason
2	(United States) Serena Williams	6,110	1,300	4,810	Pregnancy
32	(Germany) Laura Siegemund	1,510	10	1,500	Knee injury (cruciate ligament rupture)

== Other entry information ==
=== Wild cards ===
- (France) Tessah Andrianjafitrimo
- (United States) Amanda Anisimova
- (France) Fiona Ferro
- (Australia) Jaimee Fourlis
- (France) Myrtille Georges
- (France) Amandine Hesse
- (France) Alizé Lim
- (France) Chloé Paquet

=== Protected ranking ===
- (Australia) Ajla Tomljanović (75)
- (Slovakia) Magdaléna Rybáriková (108)

=== Qualifiers ===
- (Canada) Françoise Abanda
- (Romania) Ana Bogdan
- (Italy) Sara Errani
- (Brazil) Beatriz Haddad Maia
- (Netherlands) Richèl Hogenkamp
- (Japan) Miyu Kato
- (Ukraine) Kateryna Kozlova
- (Netherlands) Quirine Lemoine
- (Croatia) Petra Martić
- (United States) Bethanie Mattek-Sands
- (Belgium) Alison Van Uytvanck
- (Czech Republic) Markéta Vondroušová

=== Lucky loser ===
- (Tunisia) Ons Jabeur

=== Withdrawals ===
- ‡ (United States) Serena Williams (2) → replaced by (Paraguay) Verónica Cepede Royg (108)
- ‡ (United States) Vania King (102) → replaced by (Slovakia) Magdaléna Rybáriková (108 PR) (Note: Last direct acceptance)
- @ (Germany) Laura Siegemund (37) → replaced by (Tunisia) Ons Jabeur (LL)

‡ – withdrew from entry list before qualifying began
@ – withdrew from entry list after qualifying began

=== Retirements ===
- (Romania) Patricia Maria Țig

== Championship match statistics ==
Category	(Latvia) Ostapenko	(Romania) Halep
1st serve %	55/96 (57%)	73/99 (73%)
1st serve points won	38 of 55 = 69%	40 of 73 = 55%
2nd serve points won	12 of 41 = 29%	8 of 27 = 30%
Total service points won	50 of 96 = 52.08%	48 of 99 = 48.48%
Aces	3	0
Double faults	5	0
Winners	54	8
Unforced errors	54	10
Net points won	7 of 9 = 78%	2 of 2 = 100%
Break points converted	8 of 19 = 42%	6 of 16 = 38%
Return points won	51 of 99 = 52%	46 of 96 = 48%
Total points won	101	94

== Notes ==
Preceded by 2017 Australian Open – Women's singles	Grand Slam women's singles	Succeeded by 2017 Wimbledon Championships – Women's singles
