= 2017 French Open =

- Date: 28 May – 11 June 2017
- Edition: 116
- Category: Grand Slam
- Draw: 128S/64D/32X
- Prize money: €36,000,000
- Surface: Clay
- Location: Paris (XVI^{e}), France
- Venue: Roland Garros Stadium

Champions

Men's singles
- (Spain) Rafael Nadal

Women's singles
- (Latvia) Jeļena Ostapenko

Men's doubles
- (United States) Ryan Harrison / (New Zealand) Michael Venus

Women's doubles
- (United States) Bethanie Mattek-Sands / (Czech Republic) Lucie Šafářová

Mixed doubles
- (Canada) Gabriela Dabrowski / (India) Rohan Bopanna

Wheelchair men's singles
- (United Kingdom) Alfie Hewett

Wheelchair women's singles
- (Japan) Yui Kamiji

Wheelchair men's doubles
- (France) Stéphane Houdet / (France) Nicolas Peifer

Wheelchair women's doubles
- (Netherlands) Marjolein Buis / (Japan) Yui Kamiji

Boys' singles
- (Australia) Alexei Popyrin

Girls' singles
- (United States) Whitney Osuigwe

Boys' doubles
- (Spain) Nicola Kuhn / (Hungary) Zsombor Piros

Girls' doubles
- (Canada) Bianca Andreescu / (Canada) Carson Branstine

Legends under 45 doubles
- (France) Sébastien Grosjean / (France) Michaël Llodra

Women's legends doubles
- (United States) Tracy Austin / (Belgium) Kim Clijsters

Legends over 45 doubles
- (France) Mansour Bahrami / (France) Fabrice Santoro
- French Open

The 2017 French Open was a tennis tournament played on outdoor clay courts. It was the 116th edition of the French Open and the second Grand Slam event of the year. It took place at the Stade Roland Garros from 28 May to 11 June and consisted of events for players in singles, doubles and mixed doubles play. Junior and wheelchair players also took part in singles and doubles events.

Novak Djokovic was the defending champion in the Men's Singles, but he lost in the quarter-finals to Dominic Thiem. Garbiñe Muguruza was the defending champion in the Women's Singles, but she lost in the 4th Round to Kristina Mladenovic.

This was the first time since 1974 French Open that both reigning champions of the Australian Open (Serena Williams and Roger Federer) withdrew before the tournament began.

== Tournament ==
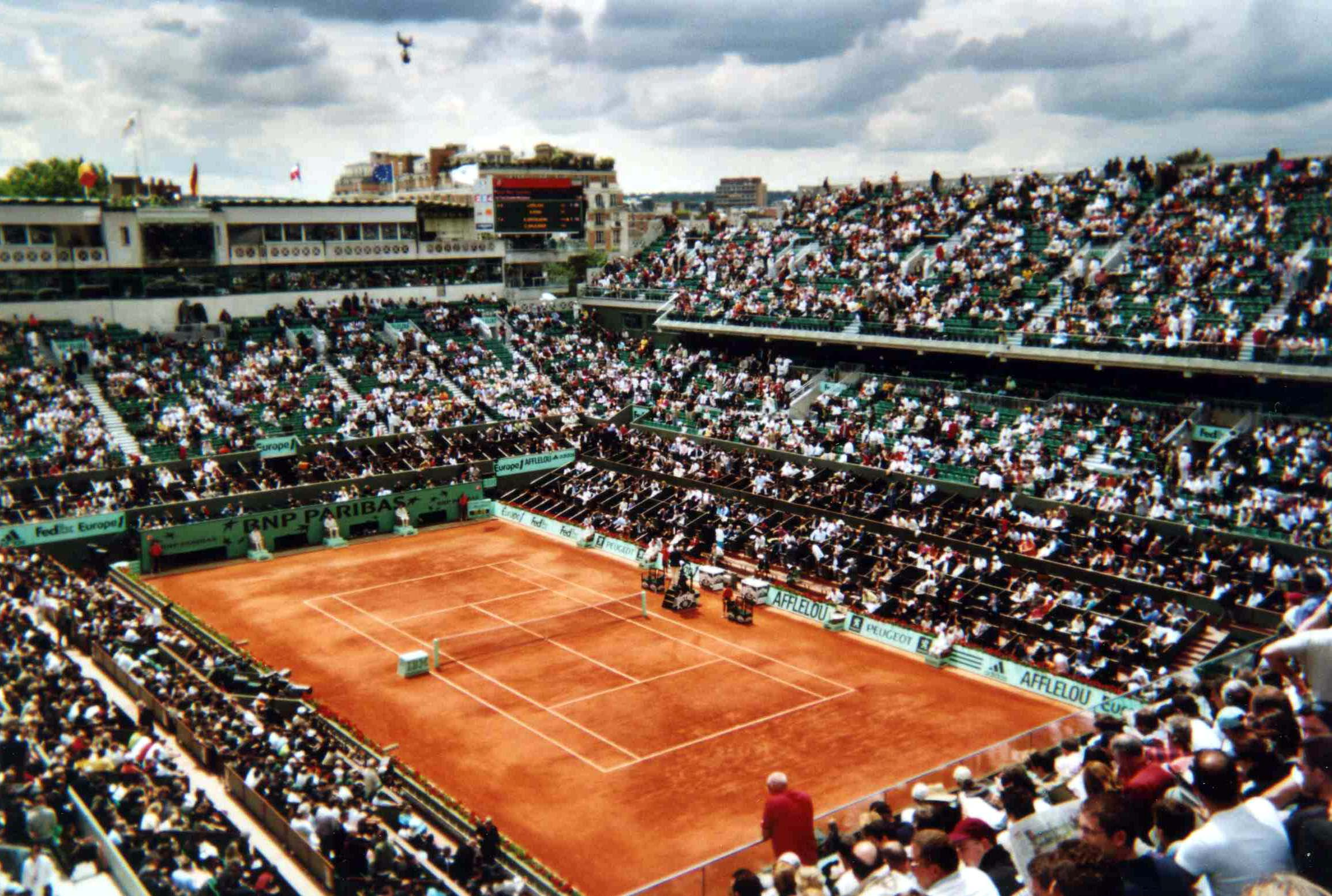
Court Philippe Chatrier where the Finals of the French Open took place.

The 2017 French Open was the 116th edition of the French Open and was held at Stade Roland Garros in Paris.

The tournament was an event run by the International Tennis Federation (ITF) and was part of the 2017 ATP World Tour and the 2017 WTA Tour calendars under the Grand Slam category. The tournament consisted of both men's and women's singles and doubles draws as well as a mixed doubles event.

There were singles and doubles events for both boys and girls (players under 18), which are part of the Grade A category of tournaments, and singles and doubles events for men's and women's wheelchair tennis players under the Grand Slam category. The tournament was played on clay courts and took place over a series of 22 courts, including the three main showcourts, Court Philippe Chatrier, Court Suzanne Lenglen and Court 1.

== Points and prize money ==
=== Points distribution ===
Below is a series of tables for each of the competitions showing the ranking points on offer for each event.

==== Senior points ====
Event	W	F	SF	QF	Round of 16	Round of 32	Round of 64	Round of 128	Q	Q3	Q2	Q1
Men's singles	2000	1200	720	360	180	90	45	10	25	16	8	0
Men's doubles	2000	1200	720	360	180	90	0	—N/a	—N/a	—N/a	—N/a	—N/a
Women's singles	2000	1300	780	430	240	130	70	10	40	30	20	2
Women's doubles	2000	1300	780	430	240	130	10	—N/a	—N/a	—N/a	—N/a	—N/a

==== Wheelchair points ====
Event	W	F	SF/3rd	QF/4th
Singles	800	500	375	100
Doubles	800	500	100	—N/a
Quad singles	800	500	100	—N/a
Quad doubles	800	100	—N/a	—N/a

==== Junior points ====
Event	W	F	SF	QF	Round of 16	Round of 32	Q	Q3
Boys' singles	375	270	180	120	75	30	25	20
Girls' singles	375	270	180	120	75	30	25	20
Boys' doubles	270	180	120	75	45	—N/a	—N/a	—N/a
Girls' doubles	270	180	120	75	45	—N/a	—N/a	—N/a

=== Prize money ===
The total prize money for the 2017 edition is €36,000,000, a 12% increase compared to 2016. The winners of the men's and women's singles title receive €2,100,000, an increase of €100,000 compared to 2016.

Event	W	F	SF	QF	Round of 16	Round of 32	Round of 64	Round of 128	Q3	Q2	Q1
Singles	€2,100,000	€1,060,000	€530,000	€340,000	€200,000	€118,000	€70,000	€35,000	€18,000	€9,000	€5,000
Doubles *	€540,000	€270,000	€132,000	€72,000	€39,000	€21,000	€10,500	—N/a	—N/a	—N/a	—N/a
Mixed doubles *	€140,000	€70,500	€37,750	€17,000	€8,500	€4,500	—N/a	—N/a	—N/a	—N/a	—N/a
Wheelchair singles	€35,000	€17,500	€8,500	€4,500	—N/a	—N/a	—N/a	—N/a	—N/a	—N/a	—N/a
Wheelchair doubles *	€10,000	€5,000	€3,000	—N/a	—N/a	—N/a	—N/a	—N/a	—N/a	—N/a	—N/a

_{* per team}

== Singles players ==
2017 French Open – Men's singles

Champion		Runner-up	
(Spain) Rafael Nadal [4]		(Switzerland) Stan Wawrinka [3]	
Semifinals out
(United Kingdom) Andy Murray [1]		(Austria) Dominic Thiem [6]	
Quarterfinals out
(Japan) Kei Nishikori [8]	(Croatia) Marin Čilić [7]	(Spain) Pablo Carreño Busta [20]	(Serbia) Novak Djokovic [2]
4th round out
(Russia) Karen Khachanov	(Spain) Fernando Verdasco	(France) Gaël Monfils [15]	(South Africa) Kevin Anderson
(Canada) Milos Raonic [5]	(Spain) Roberto Bautista Agut [17]	(Argentina) Horacio Zeballos	(Spain) Albert Ramos Viñolas [19]
3rd round out
(Argentina) Juan Martín del Potro [29]	(United States) John Isner [21]	(Uruguay) Pablo Cuevas [22]	(South Korea) Chung Hyeon
(Italy) Fabio Fognini [28]	(France) Richard Gasquet [24]	(United Kingdom) Kyle Edmund	(Spain) Feliciano López
(Spain) Guillermo García López	(Bulgaria) Grigor Dimitrov [11]	(Czech Republic) Jiří Veselý	(Georgia (country)) Nikoloz Basilashvili
(United States) Steve Johnson [25]	(Belgium) David Goffin [10]	(France) Lucas Pouille [16]	(Argentina) Diego Schwartzman
2nd round out
(Slovakia) Martin Kližan	(Spain) Nicolás Almagro	(Italy) Paolo Lorenzi	(Czech Republic) Tomáš Berdych [13]
(France) Pierre-Hugues Herbert	(Argentina) Nicolás Kicker	(Uzbekistan) Denis Istomin	(France) Jérémy Chardy
(Ukraine) Alexandr Dolgopolov	(Italy) Andreas Seppi	(Dominican Republic) Víctor Estrella Burgos	(Brazil) Thiago Monteiro
(Argentina) Renzo Olivo	(Australia) Nick Kyrgios [18]	(Spain) David Ferrer [30]	(Russia) Konstantin Kravchuk
(Brazil) Rogério Dutra Silva	(Argentina) Marco Trungelliti (Q)	(Japan) Taro Daniel (Q)	(Spain) Tommy Robredo (PR)
(United Kingdom) Aljaž Bedene	(Kazakhstan) Mikhail Kukushkin	(Serbia) Viktor Troicki	(Netherlands) Robin Haase
(Italy) Simone Bolelli (Q)	(Croatia) Borna Ćorić	(Croatia) Ivo Karlović [23]	(Ukraine) Sergiy Stakhovsky (Q)
(Brazil) Thomaz Bellucci	(France) Benjamin Bonzi (WC)	(Italy) Stefano Napolitano (Q)	(Portugal) João Sousa
1st round out
(Russia) Andrey Kuznetsov	(France) Laurent Lokoli (WC)	(Cyprus) Marcos Baghdatis	(Argentina) Guido Pella (Q)
(Australia) Jordan Thompson	(Lithuania) Ričardas Berankis (PR)	(Chile) Nicolás Jarry (Q)	(Germany) Jan-Lennard Struff
(Germany) Alexander Zverev [9]	(United States) Jared Donaldson	(Bosnia and Herzegovina) Damir Džumhur	(France) Maxime Hamou (Q)
(United States) Sam Querrey [27]	(United States) Ernesto Escobedo	(Moldova) Radu Albot	(Australia) Thanasi Kokkinakis (PR)
(Slovakia) Jozef Kovalík (Q)	(Argentina) Carlos Berlocq	(Colombia) Santiago Giraldo (Q)	(United States) Frances Tiafoe
(Belgium) Arthur De Greef (Q)	(Russia) Teymuraz Gabashvili (Q)	(France) Alexandre Müller (WC)	(Germany) Dustin Brown
(France) Jo-Wilfried Tsonga [12]	(Portugal) Gastão Elias	(Tunisia) Malek Jaziri	(Germany) Philipp Kohlschreiber
(United States) Donald Young	(United States) Bjorn Fratangelo (Q)	(Argentina) Federico Delbonis	(Latvia) Ernests Gulbis (PR)
(Belgium) Steve Darcis	(Russia) Mikhail Youzhny	(France) Quentin Halys (WC)	(Luxembourg) Gilles Müller [26]
(Germany) Florian Mayer	(Poland) Jerzy Janowicz (PR)	(United Kingdom) Dan Evans	(France) Stéphane Robert
(United States) Jack Sock [14]	(United States) Ryan Harrison	(United States) Tennys Sandgren (WC)	(Australia) John Millman (PR)
(France) Gilles Simon [31]	(Russia) Evgeny Donskoy	(Australia) Alex de Minaur (WC)	(France) Benoît Paire
(Australia) Bernard Tomic	(France) Nicolas Mahut	(France) Mathias Bourgue (WC)	(Japan) Yūichi Sugita
(Greece) Stefanos Tsitsipas (Q)	(France) Adrian Mannarino	(Chinese Taipei) Lu Yen-hsun	(France) Paul-Henri Mathieu (Q)
(France) Julien Benneteau (WC)	(Serbia) Dušan Lajović	(Russia) Daniil Medvedev	(Romania) Marius Copil (Q)
(Germany) Mischa Zverev [32]	(Russia) Andrey Rublev (LL)	(Serbia) Janko Tipsarević	(Spain) Marcel Granollers

2017 French Open – Women's singles

Champion		Runner-up	
(Latvia) Jeļena Ostapenko		(Romania) Simona Halep [3]	
Semifinals out
(Switzerland) Timea Bacsinszky [30]		(Czech Republic) Karolína Plíšková [2]	
Quarterfinals out
(Denmark) Caroline Wozniacki [11]	(France) Kristina Mladenovic [13]	(Ukraine) Elina Svitolina [5]	(France) Caroline Garcia [28]
4th round out
(Australia) Samantha Stosur [23]	(Russia) Svetlana Kuznetsova [8]	(Spain) Garbiñe Muguruza [4]	(United States) Venus Williams [10]
(Spain) Carla Suárez Navarro [21]	(Croatia) Petra Martić (Q)	(France) Alizé Cornet	(Paraguay) Verónica Cepede Royg
3rd round out
(Ukraine) Lesia Tsurenko	(United States) Bethanie Mattek-Sands (Q)	(United States) Catherine Bellis	(China) Zhang Shuai [32]
(Kazakhstan) Yulia Putintseva [27]	(United States) Shelby Rogers	(Belgium) Elise Mertens	(Tunisia) Ons Jabeur (LL)
(Poland) Magda Linette	(Latvia) Anastasija Sevastova [17]	(Russia) Elena Vesnina [14]	(Russia) Daria Kasatkina [26]
(Chinese Taipei) Hsieh Su-wei	(Poland) Agnieszka Radwańska [9]	(Colombia) Mariana Duque Mariño	(Germany) Carina Witthöft
2nd round out
(Russia) Ekaterina Makarova	(Puerto Rico) Monica Puig	(Belgium) Kirsten Flipkens	(Czech Republic) Petra Kvitová [15]
(Canada) Françoise Abanda (Q)	(Netherlands) Kiki Bertens [18]	(Belarus) Aliaksandra Sasnovich	(France) Océane Dodin
(Estonia) Anett Kontaveit	(Sweden) Johanna Larsson	(Turkey) Çağla Büyükakçay	(Italy) Sara Errani (Q)
(Japan) Kurumi Nara	(Netherlands) Richèl Hogenkamp (Q)	(United States) Madison Brengle	(Slovakia) Dominika Cibulková [6]
(Bulgaria) Tsvetana Pironkova	(Croatia) Ana Konjuh [29]	(Canada) Eugenie Bouchard	(United States) Madison Keys [12]
(United States) Varvara Lepchenko	(Romania) Sorana Cîrstea	(Czech Republic) Markéta Vondroušová (Q)	(Germany) Tatjana Maria
(United States) Taylor Townsend	(France) Chloé Paquet (WC)	(Czech Republic) Barbora Strýcová [20]	(Belgium) Alison Van Uytvanck (Q)
(Russia) Anastasia Pavlyuchenkova [16]	(Slovakia) Magdaléna Rybáriková (PR)	(France) Pauline Parmentier	(Russia) Ekaterina Alexandrova
1st round out
(Germany) Angelique Kerber [1]	(Ukraine) Kateryna Kozlova (Q)	(United States) Louisa Chirico	(Italy) Roberta Vinci [31]
(Slovakia) Kristína Kučová	(Luxembourg) Mandy Minella	(Russia) Evgeniya Rodina	(United States) Julia Boserup
(Australia) Jaimee Fourlis (WC)	(France) Tessah Andrianjafitrimo (WC)	(Netherlands) Quirine Lemoine (Q)	(Australia) Ajla Tomljanović (PR)
(Croatia) Donna Vekić	(Switzerland) Viktorija Golubic	(Italy) Camila Giorgi	(United States) Christina McHale
(Italy) Francesca Schiavone	(Romania) Monica Niculescu	(Russia) Natalia Vikhlyantseva	(France) Myrtille Georges (WC)
(Croatia) Mirjana Lučić-Baroni [22]	(New Zealand) Marina Erakovic	(Japan) Misaki Doi	(United States) Jennifer Brady
(China) Wang Qiang	(United States) Amanda Anisimova (WC)	(Serbia) Jelena Janković	(Australia) Daria Gavrilova [24]
(Spain) Sara Sorribes Tormo	(Germany) Julia Görges	(Romania) Ana Bogdan (Q)	(Spain) Lara Arruabarrena
(Kazakhstan) Yaroslava Shvedova	(Germany) Mona Barthel	(France) Alizé Lim (WC)	(Montenegro) Danka Kovinić
(Germany) Annika Beck	(Japan) Risa Ozaki	(Ukraine) Kateryna Bondarenko	(Australia) Ashleigh Barty
(Brazil) Beatriz Haddad Maia (Q)	(Germany) Andrea Petkovic	(China) Peng Shuai	(Greece) Maria Sakkari
(Belgium) Yanina Wickmayer	(France) Amandine Hesse (WC)	(China) Duan Yingying	(Slovakia) Jana Čepelová
(United Kingdom) Johanna Konta [7]	(Japan) Miyu Kato (Q)	(Czech Republic) Kristýna Plíšková	(Japan) Nao Hibino
(United States) Alison Riske	(Hungary) Tímea Babos	(Japan) Naomi Osaka	(France) Fiona Ferro (WC)
(Romania) Patricia Maria Țig	(Czech Republic) Lucie Šafářová	(Romania) Irina-Camelia Begu	(United States) CoCo Vandeweghe [19]
(United States) Lauren Davis [25]	(Russia) Irina Khromacheva	(Czech Republic) Kateřina Siniaková	(China) Zheng Saisai

== Doubles seeds ==
=== Men's doubles ===
Team		Rank^{1}	Seed
(Finland) Henri Kontinen	(Australia) John Peers	3	1
(France) Pierre-Hugues Herbert	(France) Nicolas Mahut	8	2
(United States) Bob Bryan	(United States) Mike Bryan	12	3
(Poland) Łukasz Kubot	(Brazil) Marcelo Melo	14	4
(United Kingdom) Jamie Murray	(Brazil) Bruno Soares	17	5
(Spain) Feliciano López	(Spain) Marc López	26	6
(Croatia) Ivan Dodig	(Spain) Marcel Granollers	27	7
(South Africa) Raven Klaasen	(United States) Rajeev Ram	28	8
(India) Rohan Bopanna	(Uruguay) Pablo Cuevas	45	9
~~(Spain) Pablo Carreño Busta~~	~~(Spain) Guillermo García López~~	~~46~~	~~10~~
(Netherlands) Jean-Julien Rojer	(Romania) Horia Tecău	47	11
(Poland) Marcin Matkowski	(France) Édouard Roger-Vasselin	49	12
(Romania) Florin Mergea	(Pakistan) Aisam-ul-Haq Qureshi	52	13
(France) Fabrice Martin	(Canada) Daniel Nestor	53	14
(Austria) Oliver Marach	(Croatia) Mate Pavić	66	15
(Colombia) Juan Sebastián Cabal	(Colombia) Robert Farah	72	16

- ^{1} Rankings were as of 22 May 2017.

=== Women's doubles ===
Team		Rank^{1}	Seed
(United States) Bethanie Mattek-Sands	(Czech Republic) Lucie Šafářová	3	1
(Russia) Ekaterina Makarova	(Russia) Elena Vesnina	6	2
(Chinese Taipei) Chan Yung-jan	(Switzerland) Martina Hingis	15	3
(India) Sania Mirza	(Kazakhstan) Yaroslava Shvedova	22	4
(Hungary) Tímea Babos	(Czech Republic) Andrea Hlaváčková	22	5
(Czech Republic) Lucie Hradecká	(Czech Republic) Kateřina Siniaková	32	6
~~(Germany) Julia Görges~~	~~(Czech Republic) Barbora Strýcová~~	~~37~~	~~7~~
(United States) Abigail Spears	(Slovenia) Katarina Srebotnik	39	8
(Canada) Gabriela Dabrowski	(China) Xu Yifan	43	9
(United States) Raquel Atawo	(Latvia) Jeļena Ostapenko	53	10
(Germany) Anna-Lena Grönefeld	(Czech Republic) Květa Peschke	54	11
(Chinese Taipei) Chan Hao-ching	(Czech Republic) Barbora Krejčíková	56	12
(Netherlands) Kiki Bertens	(Sweden) Johanna Larsson	58	13
(Russia) Svetlana Kuznetsova	(France) Kristina Mladenovic	63	14
(Slovenia) Andreja Klepač	(Spain) María José Martínez Sánchez	64	15
~~(United States) Christina McHale~~	~~(Romania) Monica Niculescu~~	~~65~~	~~16~~
(Croatia) Darija Jurak	(Australia) Anastasia Rodionova	70	17
(Japan) Eri Hozumi	(Japan) Miyu Kato	75	18

- ^{1} Rankings were as of 22 May 2017.

=== Mixed doubles ===
Team		Rank^{1}	Seed
(Chinese Taipei) Chan Yung-jan	(Australia) John Peers	11	1
(India) Sania Mirza	(Croatia) Ivan Dodig	19	2
(Czech Republic) Andrea Hlaváčková	(France) Édouard Roger-Vasselin	27	3
(Slovenia) Katarina Srebotnik	(South Africa) Raven Klaasen	34	4
(Kazakhstan) Yaroslava Shvedova	(Austria) Alexander Peya	39	5
(Chinese Taipei) Chan Hao-ching	(Netherlands) Jean-Julien Rojer	42	6
(Canada) Gabriela Dabrowski	(India) Rohan Bopanna	42	7
(Latvia) Jeļena Ostapenko	(Brazil) Bruno Soares	43	8

- ^{1} Rankings were as of 22 May 2017.

== Main draw wildcard entries ==
The following players were given wildcards to the main draw based on internal selection and recent performances.

=== Men's doubles ===
- (France) Grégoire Barrère / (France) Albano Olivetti
- (France) Mathias Bourgue / (France) Paul-Henri Mathieu
- (France) Kenny de Schepper / (France) Vincent Millot
- (France) Jonathan Eysseric / (France) Tristan Lamasine
- (France) Quentin Halys / (France) Adrian Mannarino
- (France) Grégoire Jacq / (France) Hugo Nys
- (France) Constant Lestienne / (France) Corentin Moutet

=== Women's doubles ===
- (France) Audrey Albié / (France) Harmony Tan
- (France) Tessah Andrianjafitrimo / (France) Amandine Hesse
- (France) Manon Arcangioli / (France) Alizé Lim
- (France) Fiona Ferro / (France) Margot Yerolymos
- (France) Myrtille Georges / (France) Chloé Paquet
- (France) Giulia Morlet / (France) Diane Parry
- (France) Marine Partaud / (France) Virginie Razzano

=== Mixed doubles ===
- (France) Alizé Cornet / (France) Jonathan Eysseric
- (France) Myrtille Georges / (France) Geoffrey Blancaneaux
- (Australia) Jessica Moore / (Australia) Matt Reid
- (France) Chloé Paquet / (France) Benoît Paire
- (France) Pauline Parmentier / (France) Mathias Bourgue
- (France) Virginie Razzano / (France) Vincent Millot

== Champions ==
=== Seniors ===
==== Men's singles ====
- (Spain) Rafael Nadal def. (Switzerland) Stan Wawrinka, 6–2, 6–3, 6–1

==== Women's singles ====
- (Latvia) Jeļena Ostapenko def. (Romania) Simona Halep, 4–6, 6–4, 6–3

==== Men's doubles ====
- (United States) Ryan Harrison / (New Zealand) Michael Venus def. (Mexico) Santiago González / (United States) Donald Young, 7–6^{(7–5)}, 6–7^{(4–7)}, 6–3

==== Women's doubles ====
- (United States) Bethanie Mattek-Sands / (Czech Republic) Lucie Šafářová def. (Australia) Ashleigh Barty / (Australia) Casey Dellacqua, 6–2, 6–1

==== Mixed doubles ====
- (Canada) Gabriela Dabrowski / (India) Rohan Bopanna def. (Germany) Anna-Lena Grönefeld / (Colombia) Robert Farah, 2–6, 6–2, [12–10]

=== Juniors ===
==== Boys' singles ====
- (Australia) Alexei Popyrin def. (Spain) Nicola Kuhn, 7–6^{(7–5)}, 6–3

==== Girls' singles ====
- (United States) Whitney Osuigwe def. (United States) Claire Liu, 6–4, 6–7^{(5–7)}, 6–3

==== Boys' doubles ====
- (Spain) Nicola Kuhn / (Hungary) Zsombor Piros def. (United States) Vasil Kirkov / (United States) Danny Thomas, 6–4, 6–4

==== Girls' doubles ====
- (Canada) Bianca Andreescu / (Canada) Carson Branstine def. (Russia) Olesya Pervushina / (Russia) Anastasia Potapova, 6–1, 6–3

=== Wheelchair events ===
==== Wheelchair men's singles ====
- (United Kingdom) Alfie Hewett def. (Argentina) Gustavo Fernández, 0–6, 7–6^{(11–9)}, 6–2

==== Wheelchair women's singles ====
- (Japan) Yui Kamiji def. (Germany) Sabine Ellerbrock, 7–5, 6–4

==== Wheelchair men's doubles ====
- (France) Stéphane Houdet / (France) Nicolas Peifer def. (United Kingdom) Alfie Hewett / (United Kingdom) Gordon Reid, 6–4, 6–3

==== Wheelchair women's doubles ====
- (Netherlands) Marjolein Buis / (Japan) Yui Kamiji def. (Netherlands) Jiske Griffioen / (Netherlands) Aniek van Koot, 6–3, 7–5

=== Other events ===
==== Legends under 45 doubles ====
- (France) Sébastien Grosjean / (France) Michaël Llodra def. (Netherlands) Paul Haarhuis / (Ukraine) Andriy Medvedev, 6–4, 3–6, [10–8]

==== Legends over 45 doubles ====
- (France) Mansour Bahrami / (France) Fabrice Santoro def. (Australia) Pat Cash / (United States) Michael Chang, 7–6^{(7–3)}, 6–3

==== Women's legends doubles ====
- (United States) Tracy Austin / (Belgium) Kim Clijsters def. (United States) Lindsay Davenport / (United States) Martina Navratilova, 6–3, 3–6, [10–5]

Preceded by 2017 Australian Open	Grand Slam events	Succeeded by 2017 Wimbledon Championships
