= 2017 French Open – Men's singles =

Tennis tournament held in 2017

Men's singles
- 2017 French Open

Final
- Champion: (Spain) Rafael Nadal
- Runner-up: (Switzerland) Stan Wawrinka
- Score: 6–2, 6–3, 6–1

Details
- Draw: 128 (16 Q / 8 WC )
- Seeds: 32

Events
Singles	men	women		boys	girls
Doubles	men	women	mixed	boys	girls
WC Singles	men	women	quad
WC Doubles	men	women	quad
Legends	−45	45+	women
- French Open

Rafael Nadal defeated Stan Wawrinka in the final, 6–2, 6–3, 6–1 to win the men's singles tennis title at the 2017 French Open. It was his record-extending tenth French Open title and 15th major title overall. Nadal became the first man to win ten singles titles at the same major. He did not lose a set during the tournament for a third time (after 2008 and 2010, tying Bjorn Borg’s record), not losing more than four games in any set played, and not losing more than 8 games in a match. He lost only 35 games during the tournament, his personal best, and the second-best in the tournament's history after Björn Borg’s 32 in 1978. Nadal also became the third man, after Ken Rosewall and Pete Sampras, to win a major title in his teens, twenties, and thirties.

Following his 10th Monte Carlo Masters title on 23 April, and 10th Barcelona Open title on 30 April, Nadal’s 10th Roland Garros title makes him the first, and only, man in the Open Era to win 3 different tournaments 10 times each.

Novak Djokovic was the defending champion, but lost to Dominic Thiem in the quarterfinals in a rematch of the previous year's semifinal match. Djokovic was attempting to become the first man in the Open Era to achieve a double career Grand Slam. This was the first time since 2010 that he did not reach at least the semifinals at the French Open.

The hard-fought semifinal between Wawrinka and Andy Murray marked the end for both players at the very top of the sport, as both suffered injuries that took them out of the game for months. Neither player would reach a Grand Slam semifinal again.

This marked the first major appearance of future ATP Finals champion and two-time major finalist Stefanos Tsitsipas, who lost to Ivo Karlović in the first round.

== Seeds ==
1. (United Kingdom) Andy Murray (semifinals)
2. (Serbia) Novak Djokovic (quarterfinals)
3. (Switzerland) Stan Wawrinka (final)
4. (Spain) Rafael Nadal (champion)
5. (Canada) Milos Raonic (fourth round)
6. (Austria) Dominic Thiem (semifinals)
7. (Croatia) Marin Čilić (quarterfinals)
8. (Japan) Kei Nishikori (quarterfinals)
9. (Germany) Alexander Zverev (first round)
10. (Belgium) David Goffin (third round, retired)
11. (Bulgaria) Grigor Dimitrov (third round)
12. (France) Jo-Wilfried Tsonga (first round)
13. (Czech Republic) Tomáš Berdych (second round)
14. (United States) Jack Sock (first round)
15. (France) Gaël Monfils (fourth round)
16. (France) Lucas Pouille (third round)

17. (Spain) Roberto Bautista Agut (fourth round)
18. (Australia) Nick Kyrgios (second round)
19. (Spain) Albert Ramos Viñolas (fourth round)
20. (Spain) Pablo Carreño Busta (quarterfinals, retired)
21. (United States) John Isner (third round)
22. (Uruguay) Pablo Cuevas (third round)
23. (Croatia) Ivo Karlović (second round)
24. (France) Richard Gasquet (third round, retired)
25. (United States) Steve Johnson (third round)
26. (Luxembourg) Gilles Müller (first round)
27. (United States) Sam Querrey (first round)
28. (Italy) Fabio Fognini (third round)
29. (Argentina) Juan Martín del Potro (third round)
30. (Spain) David Ferrer (second round)
31. (France) Gilles Simon (first round)
32. (Germany) Mischa Zverev (first round)

Click on the seed number of a player to go to their draw section.

== Draw ==
Key

- Q = Qualifier
- WC = Wild card
- LL = Lucky loser
- Alt = Alternate
- ITF = ITF entry
- PR = Protected ranking
- SR = Special ranking
- SE = Special exempt
- JE = Junior exempt
- JR = Junior Accelerator Programme entrant
- CO = College Accelerator Programme entrant
- NG = Next Gen Accelerator Program entrant
- w/o = Walkover
- r = Retired
- d = Defaulted

=== Finals ===
Quarterfinals
1	(United Kingdom) Andy Murray	2	6	7^{7}	6
8	(Japan) Kei Nishikori	6	1	6^{0}	1
3	(Switzerland) Stan Wawrinka	6	6	6
7	(Croatia) Marin Čilić	3	3	1
20	(Spain) Pablo Carreño Busta	2	0^{r}
4	(Spain) Rafael Nadal	6	2
6	(Austria) Dominic Thiem	7^{7}	6	6
2	(Serbia) Novak Djokovic	6^{5}	3	0

Semifinals
1	(United Kingdom) Andy Murray	7^{8}	3	7	6^{3}	1
3	(Switzerland) Stan Wawrinka	6^{6}	6	5	7^{7}	6
4	(Spain) Rafael Nadal	6	6	6
6	(Austria) Dominic Thiem	3	4	0

Final
3	(Switzerland) Stan Wawrinka	2	3	1
4	(Spain) Rafael Nadal	6	6	6

=== Top half ===
==== Section 1 ====
First round
1	(United Kingdom) A Murray	6	4	6	6
(Russia) A Kuznetsov	4	6	2	0
WC	(France) L Lokoli	6^{4}	3	6	6	4
(Slovakia) M Kližan	7^{7}	6	4	0	6
(Cyprus) M Baghdatis	7^{7}	4	3	6^{1}
(Spain) N Almagro	6^{3}	6	6	7^{7}
Q	(Argentina) G Pella	2	1	4
29	(Argentina) JM del Potro	6	6	6
21	(United States) J Isner	6	4	7^{7}	6
(Australia) J Thompson	3	6	6^{5}	3
(Italy) P Lorenzi	6	6	6
PR	(Lithuania) R Berankis	0	2	4
(Russia) K Khachanov	6	3	7^{7}	6
Q	(Chile) N Jarry	4	6	6^{4}	1
(Germany) J-L Struff	1	1	6	4
13	(Czech Republic) T Berdych	6	6	4	6

Second round
1	(United Kingdom) A Murray	6^{3}	6	6	7^{7}
(Slovakia) M Kližan	7^{7}	2	2	6^{3}
(Spain) N Almagro	3	6	1^{r}
29	(Argentina) JM del Potro	6	3	1
21	(United States) J Isner	6	7^{7}	7^{7}
(Italy) P Lorenzi	3	6^{3}	6^{2}
(Russia) K Khachanov	7	6	6
13	(Czech Republic) T Berdych	5	4	4

Third round
1	(United Kingdom) A Murray	7^{10}	7	6
29	(Argentina) JM del Potro	6^{8}	5	0
21	(United States) J Isner	6^{1}	3	7^{7}	6^{3}
(Russia) K Khachanov	7^{7}	6	6^{5}	7^{7}

Fourth round
1	(United Kingdom) A Murray	6	6	6
(Russia) K Khachanov	3	4	4

==== Section 2 ====
First round
9	(Germany) A Zverev	4	6	4	2
(Spain) F Verdasco	6	3	6	6
(France) P-H Herbert	6	7^{7}	6
(United States) J Donaldson	4	6^{5}	4
(Bosnia and Herzegovina) D Džumhur	3	6	3	4
(Argentina) N Kicker	6	2	6	6
Q	(France) M Hamou	3	2	4
22	(Uruguay) P Cuevas	6	6	6
27	(United States) S Querrey	4	6	3	3
(South Korea) H Chung	6	3	6	6
(United States) E Escobedo	6^{3}	3	4
(Uzbekistan) D Istomin	7^{7}	6	6
(Moldova) R Albot	2	4	6^{3}
(France) J Chardy	6	6	7^{7}
PR	(Australia) T Kokkinakis	6	1	4	4
8	(Japan) K Nishikori	4	6	6	6

Second round
(Spain) F Verdasco	6	3	4	6	6
(France) P-H Herbert	3	6	6	3	3
(Argentina) N Kicker	4	4	4
22	(Uruguay) P Cuevas	6	6	6
(South Korea) H Chung	6	7	6
(Uzbekistan) D Istomin	1	5	1
(France) J Chardy	3	0	6^{5}
8	(Japan) K Nishikori	6	6	7^{7}

Third round
(Spain) F Verdasco	6	6	6
22	(Uruguay) P Cuevas	2	1	3
(South Korea) H Chung	5	4	7^{7}	6	4
8	(Japan) K Nishikori	7	6	6^{4}	0	6

Fourth round
(Spain) F Verdasco	6	4	4	0
8	(Japan) K Nishikori	0	6	6	6

==== Section 3 ====
First round
3	(Switzerland) S Wawrinka	6	7^{8}	6
Q	(Slovakia) J Kovalík	2	6^{6}	3
(Ukraine) A Dolgopolov	7	6	6
(Argentina) C Berlocq	5	3	4
Q	(Colombia) S Giraldo	6	1	2	2
(Italy) A Seppi	4	6	6	6
(United States) F Tiafoe	4	3	6	6	0
28	(Italy) F Fognini	6	6	3	1	6
24	(France) R Gasquet	6	3	6	6
Q	(Belgium) A De Greef	2	6	1	3
Q	(Russia) T Gabashvili	7^{11}	6	6^{3}	3	2
(Dominican Republic) V Estrella Burgos	6^{9}	2	7^{7}	6	6
(Brazil) T Monteiro	7^{7}	2	4	7^{7}	6
WC	(France) A Müller	6^{4}	6	6	6^{3}	0
(Germany) D Brown	4	5	0
15	(France) G Monfils	6	7	6

Second round
3	(Switzerland) S Wawrinka	6	7^{7}	7
(Ukraine) A Dolgopolov	4	6^{5}	5
(Italy) A Seppi	4	5	3
28	(Italy) F Fognini	6	7	6
24	(France) R Gasquet	6	6	6
(Dominican Republic) V Estrella Burgos	1	0	4
(Brazil) T Monteiro	1	4	1
15	(France) G Monfils	6	6	6

Third round
3	(Switzerland) S Wawrinka	7^{7}	6	6
28	(Italy) F Fognini	6^{2}	0	2
24	(France) R Gasquet	6^{5}	7	3^{r}
15	(France) G Monfils	7^{7}	5	4

Fourth round
3	(Switzerland) S Wawrinka	7	7^{9}	6
15	(France) G Monfils	5	6^{7}	2

==== Section 4 ====
First round
12	(France) J-W Tsonga	5	4	7^{8}	4
(Argentina) R Olivo	7	6	6^{6}	6
(United Kingdom) K Edmund	6	6	7
(Portugal) G Elias	3	2	5
(South Africa) K Anderson	7^{7}	6	7^{7}
(Tunisia) M Jaziri	6^{4}	3	6^{4}
(Germany) P Kohlschreiber	3	6^{4}	3
18	(Australia) N Kyrgios	6	7^{7}	6
30	(Spain) D Ferrer	5	6	4	6	13
(United States) D Young	7	3	6	3	11
(Spain) F López	6	7^{7}	6
Q	(United States) B Fratangelo	4	6^{4}	3
(Russia) K Kravchuk	6	6	7^{8}
(Argentina) F Delbonis	3	4	6^{6}
PR	(Latvia) E Gulbis	3	3	3
7	(Croatia) M Čilić	6	6	6

Second round
(Argentina) R Olivo	5	3	1
(United Kingdom) K Edmund	7	6	6
(South Africa) K Anderson	5	6	6	6
18	(Australia) N Kyrgios	7	4	1	2
30	(Spain) D Ferrer	5	6	5	6	4
(Spain) F López	7	3	7	4	6
(Russia) K Kravchuk	3	2	2
7	(Croatia) M Čilić	6	6	6

Third round
(United Kingdom) K Edmund	7^{8}	6^{4}	7	1	4
(South Africa) K Anderson	6^{6}	7^{7}	5	6	6
(Spain) F López	1	3	3
7	(Croatia) M Čilić	6	6	6

Fourth round
(South Africa) K Anderson	3	0^{r}
7	(Croatia) M Čilić	6	3

=== Bottom half ===
==== Section 5 ====
First round
5	(Canada) M Raonic	6	6	6
(Belgium) S Darcis	3	4	2
(Brazil) R Dutra Silva	4	7^{7}	2	7^{7}	6
(Russia) M Youzhny	6	6^{5}	6	6^{4}	2
Q	(Argentina) M Trungelliti	3	6^{4}	7^{7}	6	6
WC	(France) Q Halys	6	7^{7}	6^{2}	4	4
(Spain) G García López	7^{7}	6^{2}	6	6
26	(Luxembourg) G Müller	6^{4}	7^{7}	2	2
20	(Spain) P Carreño Busta	6	6	6
(Germany) F Mayer	4	2	2
Q	(Japan) T Daniel	6	6	6
PR	(Poland) J Janowicz	4	4	4
PR	(Spain) T Robredo	5	6	6	6
(United Kingdom) D Evans	7	4	3	1
(France) S Robert	2	3	4
11	(Bulgaria) G Dimitrov	6	6	6

Second round
5	(Canada) M Raonic	4	6	6	6
(Brazil) R Dutra Silva	6	2	3	4
Q	(Argentina) M Trungelliti	5	4	5
(Spain) G García López	7	6	7
20	(Spain) P Carreño Busta	7	6	4	6
Q	(Japan) T Daniel	5	4	6	0
PR	(Spain) T Robredo	3	4	5
11	(Bulgaria) G Dimitrov	6	6	7

Third round
5	(Canada) M Raonic	6	1
(Spain) G García López	1	0^{r}
20	(Spain) P Carreño Busta	7	6	6
11	(Bulgaria) G Dimitrov	5	3	4

Fourth round
5	(Canada) M Raonic	6	6^{2}	7^{8}	4	6
20	(Spain) P Carreño Busta	4	7^{7}	6^{6}	6	8

==== Section 6 ====
First round
14	(United States) J Sock	5	5	3
(Czech Republic) J Veselý	7	7	6
(United Kingdom) A Bedene	6	6	3	6
(United States) R Harrison	4	0	6	1
(Kazakhstan) M Kukushkin	6	6	6
WC	(United States) T Sandgren	2	1	4
PR	(Australia) J Millman	2	2	6	1
17	(Spain) R Bautista Agut	6	6	0	6
31	(France) G Simon	6	2	4	1
(Georgia (country)) N Basilashvili	1	6	6	6
(Serbia) V Troicki	7^{7}	6	6
(Russia) E Donskoy	6^{4}	4	0
(Netherlands) R Haase	6	6	6
WC	(Australia) A De Minaur	2	3	1
(France) B Paire	1	4	1
4	(Spain) R Nadal	6	6	6

Second round
(Czech Republic) J Veselý	6	6	4	6
(United Kingdom) A Bedene	3	3	6	3
(Kazakhstan) M Kukushkin	3	6	3	6^{3}
17	(Spain) R Bautista Agut	6	3	6	7^{7}
(Georgia (country)) N Basilashvili	7^{7}	7^{7}	7^{8}
(Serbia) V Troicki	6^{3}	6^{2}	6^{6}
(Netherlands) R Haase	1	4	3
4	(Spain) R Nadal	6	6	6

Third round
(Czech Republic) J Veselý	3	4	3
17	(Spain) R Bautista Agut	6	6	6
(Georgia (country)) N Basilashvili	0	1	0
4	(Spain) R Nadal	6	6	6

Fourth round
17	(Spain) R Bautista Agut	1	2	2
4	(Spain) R Nadal	6	6	6

==== Section 7 ====
First round
6	(Austria) D Thiem	6	6	6
(Australia) B Tomic	4	0	2
Q	(Italy) S Bolelli	6	6	6
(France) N Mahut	4	2	2
WC	(France) M Bourgue	6^{5}	3	2
(Croatia) B Ćorić	7^{7}	6	6
(Japan) Y Sugita	3	3	7^{7}	7^{7}	3
25	(United States) S Johnson	6	6	6^{4}	6^{3}	6
23	(Croatia) I Karlović	7^{7}	7	6
Q	(Greece) S Tsitsipas	6^{5}	5	4
(Argentina) H Zeballos	7	6	6
(France) A Mannarino	5	3	4
(Chinese Taipei) Y-h Lu	3	4	6^{4}
Q	(Ukraine) S Stakhovsky	6	6	7^{7}
Q	(France) P-H Mathieu	2	2	2
10	(Belgium) D Goffin	6	6	6

Second round
6	(Austria) D Thiem	7	6	6
Q	(Italy) S Bolelli	5	1	3
(Croatia) B Ćorić	2	6^{8}	6	6^{6}
25	(United States) S Johnson	6	7^{10}	3	7^{8}
23	(Croatia) I Karlović	6^{5}	6^{5}	3
(Argentina) H Zeballos	7^{7}	7^{7}	6
Q	(Ukraine) S Stakhovsky	2	4	6	3
10	(Belgium) D Goffin	6	6	3	6

Third round
6	(Austria) D Thiem	6	7^{7}	6
25	(United States) S Johnson	1	6^{4}	3
(Argentina) H Zeballos	4
10	(Belgium) D Goffin	5^{r}

Fourth round
6	(Austria) D Thiem	6	6	6
(Argentina) H Zeballos	1	3	1

==== Section 8 ====
First round
16	(France) L Pouille	7^{8}	3	4	6	6
WC	(France) J Benneteau	6^{6}	6	6	3	4
(Brazil) T Bellucci	4	7	6	6
(Serbia) D Lajović	6	5	4	4
WC	(France) B Bonzi	5	6	6	3
(Russia) D Medvedev	7	4	1	1^{r}
Q	(Romania) M Copil	7^{9}	1	4	2
19	(Spain) A Ramos Viñolas	6^{7}	6	6	6
32	(Germany) M Zverev	6	5	2	2
Q	(Italy) S Napolitano	4	7	6	6
LL	(Russia) A Rublev	6	4	2	7^{7}	7
(Argentina) D Schwartzman	0	6	6	6^{3}	9
(Portugal) J Sousa	4	7^{7}	6	6
(Serbia) J Tipsarević	6	6^{3}	2	2
(Spain) M Granollers	3	4	2
2	(Serbia) N Djokovic	6	6	6

Second round
16	(France) L Pouille	7^{7}	6	6
(Brazil) T Bellucci	6^{5}	1	2
WC	(France) B Bonzi	2	1	1
19	(Spain) A Ramos Viñolas	6	6	6
Q	(Italy) S Napolitano	3	5	2
(Argentina) D Schwartzman	6	7	6
(Portugal) J Sousa	1	4	3
2	(Serbia) N Djokovic	6	6	6

Third round
16	(France) L Pouille	2	6	7	2	1
19	(Spain) A Ramos Viñolas	6	3	5	6	6
(Argentina) D Schwartzman	7	3	6	1	1
2	(Serbia) N Djokovic	5	6	3	6	6

Fourth round
19	(Spain) A Ramos Viñolas	6^{5}	1	3
2	(Serbia) N Djokovic	7^{7}	6	6

== Seeded players ==
The following are the seeded players. Seedings are based on 22 May 2017. Rank and points before are as of 29 May 2017.

Because the tournament takes place one week later than in 2016, points defending includes results from both the 2016 French Open and tournaments from the week of 6 June 2016 (Stuttgart and 's-Hertogenbosch).

Seed	Rank	Player	Points before	Points defending	Points won	Points after	Status
1	1	(United Kingdom) Andy Murray	10,370	1,200	720	9,890	Semifinals lost to (Switzerland) Stan Wawrinka [3]
2	2	(Serbia) Novak Djokovic	7,445	2,000	360	5,805	Quarterfinals lost to (Austria) Dominic Thiem [6]
3	3	(Switzerland) Stan Wawrinka	5,695	720	1,200	6,175	Runner up, lost to (Spain) Rafael Nadal [4]
4	4	(Spain) Rafael Nadal	5,375	90	2,000	7,285	Champion, won against (Switzerland) Stan Wawrinka [3]
5	6	(Canada) Milos Raonic	4,450	180	180	4,450	Fourth round lost to (Spain) Pablo Carreño Busta [20]
6	7	(Austria) Dominic Thiem	4,145	720+250	720+90	3,985	Semifinals lost to (Spain) Rafael Nadal [4]
7	8	(Croatia) Marin Čilić	3,765	10	360	4,115	Quarterfinals lost to (Switzerland) Stan Wawrinka [3]
8	9	(Japan) Kei Nishikori	3,650	180	360	3,830	Quarterfinals lost to (United Kingdom) Andy Murray [1]
9	10	(Germany) Alexander Zverev	3,150	90	10	3,070	First round lost to (Spain) Fernando Verdasco
10	12	(Belgium) David Goffin	3,055	360	90	2,785	Third round retired against (Argentina) Horacio Zeballos
11	13	(Bulgaria) Grigor Dimitrov	2,900	10	90	2,980	Third round lost to (Spain) Pablo Carreño Busta [20]
12	11	(France) Jo-Wilfried Tsonga	3,120	90	10	3,040	First round lost to (Argentina) Renzo Olivo
13	14	(Czech Republic) Tomáš Berdych	2,885	360	45	2,570	Second round lost to (Russia) Karen Khachanov
14	15	(United States) Jack Sock	2,415	90	10	2,335	First round lost to (Czech Republic) Jiří Veselý
15	16	(France) Gaël Monfils	2,365	0	180	2,545	Fourth round lost to (Switzerland) Stan Wawrinka [3]
16	17	(France) Lucas Pouille	2,320	45	90	2,365	Third round lost to (Spain) Albert Ramos Viñolas [19]
17	18	(Spain) Roberto Bautista Agut	2,155	180	180	2,155	Fourth round lost to (Spain) Rafael Nadal [4]
18	19	(Australia) Nick Kyrgios	2,155	90	45	2,110	Second round lost to (South Africa) Kevin Anderson
19	20	(Spain) Albert Ramos Viñolas	2,065	360	180	1,885	Fourth round lost to (Serbia) Novak Djokovic [2]
20	21	(Spain) Pablo Carreño Busta	2,045	45	360	2,360	Quarterfinals retired against (Spain) Rafael Nadal [4]
21	22	(United States) John Isner	2,020	180	90	1,930	Third round lost to (Russia) Karen Khachanov
22	23	(Uruguay) Pablo Cuevas	1,865	90	90	1,865	Third round lost to (Spain) Fernando Verdasco
23	24	(Croatia) Ivo Karlović	1,820	90+90	45+45	1,730	Second round lost to (Argentina) Horacio Zeballos
24	25	(France) Richard Gasquet	1,605	360	90	1,335	Third round retired against (France) Gaël Monfils [15]
25	26	(United States) Steve Johnson	1,565	10	90	1,645	Third round lost to (Austria) Dominic Thiem [6]
26	27	(Luxembourg) Gilles Müller	1,530	10+150	10+45	1,425	First round lost to (Spain) Guillermo García López
27	28	(United States) Sam Querrey	1,495	10+90	10+20	1,425	First round lost to (South Korea) Chung Hyeon
28	29	(Italy) Fabio Fognini	1,350	10	90	1,430	Third round lost to (Switzerland) Stan Wawrinka [3]
29	30	(Argentina) Juan Martín del Potro	1,325	0+90	90+0	1,325	Third round lost to (United Kingdom) Andy Murray [1]
30	33	(Spain) David Ferrer	1,185	180+45	45+0	1,005	Second round lost to (Spain) Feliciano López
31	32	(France) Gilles Simon	1,200	90+45	10+20	1,095	First round lost to (Georgia (country)) Nikoloz Basilashvili
32	31	(Germany) Mischa Zverev	1,311	(20)^{†}	10	1,301	First round lost to (Italy) Stefano Napolitano [Q]

† The player did not qualify for the tournament in 2016. Accordingly, points for his 18th best result are deducted instead.

=== Withdrawn players ===
The following player would have been seeded, but withdrew from the event.

Rank	Player	Points before	Points defending	Points after	Withdrawal reason
5	(Switzerland) Roger Federer	5,035	0+90	4,945	Change of schedule

== Other entry information ==
=== Wild cards ===
- (France) Julien Benneteau
- (France) Benjamin Bonzi
- (France) Mathias Bourgue
- (Australia) Alex de Minaur
- (France) Quentin Halys
- (France) Laurent Lokoli
- (France) Alexandre Müller
- (United States) Tennys Sandgren

=== Protected ranking ===
- (Spain) Tommy Robredo (57)
- (Australia) Thanasi Kokkinakis (81)
- (Australia) John Millman (81)
- (Lithuania) Ričardas Berankis (93)
- (Poland) Jerzy Janowicz (94)
- (Latvia) Ernests Gulbis (99)

=== Qualifiers ===
- (Italy) Simone Bolelli
- (Romania) Marius Copil
- (Japan) Taro Daniel
- (Belgium) Arthur De Greef
- (United States) Bjorn Fratangelo
- (Russia) Teymuraz Gabashvili
- (Colombia) Santiago Giraldo
- (France) Maxime Hamou
- (Chile) Nicolás Jarry
- (Slovakia) Jozef Kovalík
- (France) Paul-Henri Mathieu
- (Italy) Stefano Napolitano
- (Argentina) Guido Pella
- (Ukraine) Sergiy Stakhovsky
- (Argentina) Marco Trungelliti
- (Greece) Stefanos Tsitsipas

=== Lucky loser ===
- (Russia) Andrey Rublev

=== Withdrawals ===
- ‡ (Japan) Yoshihito Nishioka (64) → replaced by (Russia) Konstantin Kravchuk (99)
- ‡ (Switzerland) Roger Federer (4) → replaced by (Latvia) Ernests Gulbis (99 PR)
- ‡ (Czech Republic) Radek Štěpánek (95) → replaced by (Spain) Guillermo García López (100) (Note: Last direct acceptance)
- @ (Russia) Dmitry Tursunov (89 PR) → replaced by (Russia) Andrey Rublev (LL)

‡ – withdrew from entry list before qualifying began
@ – withdrew from entry list after qualifying began

=== Retirements ===
- (Spain) Nicolás Almagro
- (South Africa) Kevin Anderson
- (Spain) Pablo Carreño Busta
- (Spain) Guillermo García López
- (France) Richard Gasquet
- (Belgium) David Goffin
- (Russia) Daniil Medvedev

== Notes ==
Preceded by 2017 Australian Open – Men's singles	Grand Slam men's singles	Succeeded by 2017 Wimbledon Championships – Men's singles
