= 2017 French Open – Women's doubles =

Women's doubles
- 2017 French Open

Final
- Champions: (United States) Bethanie Mattek-Sands (Czech Republic) Lucie Šafářová
- Runners-up: (Australia) Ashleigh Barty (Australia) Casey Dellacqua
- Score: 6–2, 6–1

Events
Singles	men	women		boys	girls
Doubles	men	women	mixed	boys	girls
WC Singles	men	women	quad
WC Doubles	men	women	quad
Legends	−45	45+	women
← 2016 ·	French Open	· 2018 →

Caroline Garcia and Kristina Mladenovic were the defending champions, but Garcia chose not to participate this year. Mladenovic played alongside Svetlana Kuznetsova, but lost in the third round to Bethanie Mattek-Sands and Lucie Šafářová.

Mattek-Sands and Šafářová went on to win their second French Open title and their third successive Grand Slam title, defeating Ashleigh Barty and Casey Dellacqua in the final, 6–2, 6–1.

== Seeds ==
1. (United States) Bethanie Mattek-Sands / (Czech Republic) Lucie Šafářová (champions)
2. (Russia) Ekaterina Makarova / (Russia) Elena Vesnina (quarterfinals)
3. (Chinese Taipei) Chan Yung-jan / (Switzerland) Martina Hingis (semifinals)
4. (India) Sania Mirza / (Kazakhstan) Yaroslava Shvedova (first round)
5. (Hungary) Tímea Babos / (Czech Republic) Andrea Hlaváčková (second round)
6. (Czech Republic) Lucie Hradecká / (Czech Republic) Kateřina Siniaková (semifinals)
7. (Germany) Julia Görges / (Czech Republic) Barbora Strýcová (withdrew)
8. (United States) Abigail Spears / (Slovenia) Katarina Srebotnik (second round)
9. (Canada) Gabriela Dabrowski / (China) Xu Yifan (third round)

10. (United States) Raquel Atawo / (Latvia) Jeļena Ostapenko (first round)
11. (Germany) Anna-Lena Grönefeld / (Czech Republic) Květa Peschke (first round)
12. (Chinese Taipei) Chan Hao-ching / (Czech Republic) Barbora Krejčíková (third round)
13. (Netherlands) Kiki Bertens / (Sweden) Johanna Larsson (third round)
14. (Russia) Svetlana Kuznetsova / (France) Kristina Mladenovic (third round)
15. (Slovenia) Andreja Klepač / (Spain) María José Martínez Sánchez (third round)
16. (United States) Christina McHale / (Romania) Monica Niculescu (withdrew)
17. (Croatia) Darija Jurak / (Australia) Anastasia Rodionova (second round)
18. (Japan) Eri Hozumi / (Japan) Miyu Kato (second round)

Click on the seed number of a player to go to their draw section.

== Draw ==
=== Key ===
- Q = Qualifier
- WC = Wild card
- LL = Lucky loser
- Alt = Alternate
- ITF = ITF entry
- PR = Protected ranking
- SR = Special ranking
- SE = Special exempt
- JE = Junior exempt
- JR = Junior Accelerator Programme entrant
- CO = College Accelerator Programme entrant
- NG = Next Gen Accelerator Program entrant
- w/o = Walkover
- r = Retired
- d = Defaulted

=== Finals ===
Quarterfinals
1	(United States) Bethanie Mattek-Sands (Czech Republic) Lucie Šafářová	6	6
(Belgium) Kirsten Flipkens (Italy) Francesca Schiavone	2	4
3	(Chinese Taipei) Chan Yung-jan (Switzerland) Martina Hingis	6	6
(Romania) Raluca Olaru (Ukraine) Olga Savchuk	2	1
(Romania) Irina-Camelia Begu (China) Zheng Saisai	3	4
(Australia) Ashleigh Barty (Australia) Casey Dellacqua	6	6
6	(Czech Republic) Lucie Hradecká (Czech Republic) Kateřina Siniaková	6	6
2	(Russia) Ekaterina Makarova (Russia) Elena Vesnina	1	4

Semifinals
1	(United States) Bethanie Mattek-Sands (Czech Republic) Lucie Šafářová	6	6
3	(Chinese Taipei) Chan Yung-jan (Switzerland) Martina Hingis	4	2
(Australia) Ashleigh Barty (Australia) Casey Dellacqua	7	4	6
6	(Czech Republic) Lucie Hradecká (Czech Republic) Kateřina Siniaková	5	6	3

Final
1	(United States) Bethanie Mattek-Sands (Czech Republic) Lucie Šafářová	6	6
(Australia) Ashleigh Barty (Australia) Casey Dellacqua	2	1

=== Top half ===
==== Section 1 ====
First round
1	(United States) B Mattek-Sands (Czech Republic) L Šafářová	6	6
(France) A Cornet (Belgium) E Mertens	1	2
Alt	(Russia) N Dzalamidze (Russia) V Kudermetova	2	4
PR	(Serbia) A Krunić (Australia) A Tomljanović	6	6
(Slovakia) J Čepelová (Chinese Taipei) S-w Hsieh	6	6
Alt	(Japan) K Nara (Japan) R Ozaki	2	3
(United States) S Rogers (United Kingdom) H Watson	5	6	2
14	(Russia) S Kuznetsova (France) K Mladenovic	7	4	6
11	(Germany) A-L Grönefeld (Czech Republic) K Peschke	6	5	4
WC	(France) M Georges (France) C Paquet	1	7	6
(Kazakhstan) Y Putintseva (Russia) N Vikhlyantseva	3	0
(Belgium) K Flipkens (Italy) F Schiavone	6	6
(Japan) N Hibino (Poland) A Rosolska	0	7^{7}	7^{12}
(Serbia) J Janković (United States) C Vandeweghe	6	6^{3}	6^{10}
(Germany) M Barthel (Germany) C Witthöft	2	6	4
17	(Croatia) D Jurak (Australia) An Rodionova	6	2	6

Second round
1	(United States) B Mattek-Sands (Czech Republic) L Šafářová	6^{3}	6	6
PR	(Serbia) A Krunić (Australia) A Tomljanović	7^{7}	4	4
(Slovakia) J Čepelová (Chinese Taipei) S-w Hsieh	3	2
14	(Russia) S Kuznetsova (France) K Mladenovic	6	6
WC	(France) M Georges (France) C Paquet	2	4
(Belgium) K Flipkens (Italy) F Schiavone	6	6
(Japan) N Hibino (Poland) A Rosolska	6^{4}	6	6
17	(Croatia) D Jurak (Australia) An Rodionova	7^{7}	3	3

Third round
1	(United States) B Mattek-Sands (Czech Republic) L Šafářová	6	6
14	(Russia) S Kuznetsova (France) K Mladenovic	4	2
(Belgium) K Flipkens (Italy) F Schiavone	6	6
(Japan) N Hibino (Poland) A Rosolska	3	2

Quarterfinals
1	(United States) B Mattek-Sands (Czech Republic) L Šafářová	6	6
(Belgium) K Flipkens (Italy) F Schiavone	2	4

==== Section 2 ====
First round
3	(Chinese Taipei) Y-j Chan (Switzerland) M Hingis	6	6
(United Kingdom) N Broady (United States) M Sanchez	0	3
(Ukraine) K Bondarenko (Ukraine) L Tsurenko	7	2	3
(Switzerland) V Golubic (Czech Republic) Kr Plíšková	5	6	6
WC	(France) A Albié (France) H Tan	2	2
(France) P Parmentier (Belgium) Y Wickmayer	6	6
WC	(France) G Morlet (France) D Parry	1	1
13	(Netherlands) K Bertens (Sweden) J Larsson	6	6
9	(Canada) G Dabrowski (China) Y Xu	6	6
(Australia) S Stosur (China) S Zhang	2	3
(Georgia (country)) O Kalashnikova (Turkey) İ Soylu	5	6	2
Alt	(United States) M Brengle (United Kingdom) A Smith	7	3	6
(Romania) R Olaru (Ukraine) O Savchuk	7	7
(Luxembourg) M Minella (Latvia) A Sevastova	5	5
WC	(France) T Andrianjafitrimo (France) A Hesse	3	0
5	(Hungary) T Babos (Czech Republic) A Hlaváčková	6	6

Second round
3	(Chinese Taipei) Y-j Chan (Switzerland) M Hingis	6	6
(Switzerland) V Golubic (Czech Republic) Kr Plíšková	1	1
(France) P Parmentier (Belgium) Y Wickmayer	2	5
13	(Netherlands) K Bertens (Sweden) J Larsson	6	7
9	(Canada) G Dabrowski (China) Y Xu	6	6
Alt	(United States) M Brengle (United Kingdom) A Smith	1	2
(Romania) R Olaru (Ukraine) O Savchuk	6	4	6
5	(Hungary) T Babos (Czech Republic) A Hlaváčková	3	6	3

Third round
3	(Chinese Taipei) Y-j Chan (Switzerland) M Hingis	6	6
13	(Netherlands) K Bertens (Sweden) J Larsson	2	0
9	(Canada) G Dabrowski (China) Y Xu	3	6	2
(Romania) R Olaru (Ukraine) O Savchuk	6	3	6

Quarterfinals
3	(Chinese Taipei) Y-j Chan (Switzerland) M Hingis	6	6
(Romania) R Olaru (Ukraine) O Savchuk	2	1

=== Bottom half ===
==== Section 3 ====
First round
8	(United States) A Spears (Slovenia) K Srebotnik	6	3	6
(Spain) L Arruabarrena (Spain) A Parra Santonja	4	6	4
(Switzerland) X Knoll (Serbia) N Stojanović	3	6^{6}
(Romania) I-C Begu (China) S Zheng	6	7^{8}
(United States) V Lepchenko (Russia) E Rodina	1	5
(China) Y Duan (China) S Peng	6	7
(Russia) D Kasatkina (Russia) I Khromacheva	6	3	6
10	(United States) R Atawo (Latvia) J Ostapenko	0	6	4
18	(Japan) E Hozumi (Japan) M Kato	7	6
(United States) A Muhammad (United States) T Townsend	5	3
WC	(France) M Partaud (France) V Razzano	0	2
(Australia) A Barty (Australia) C Dellacqua	6	6
(Croatia) M Lučić-Baroni (Germany) A Petkovic	6	3	6
(Argentina) M Irigoyen (Netherlands) D Schuurs	3	6	4
(Australia) D Gavrilova (Russia) A Pavlyuchenkova	7^{7}	1	6
4	(India) S Mirza (Kazakhstan) Y Shvedova	6^{5}	6	2

Second round
8	(United States) A Spears (Slovenia) K Srebotnik	6	4	3
(Romania) I-C Begu (China) S Zheng	1	6	6
(China) Y Duan (China) S Peng	6	6
(Russia) D Kasatkina (Russia) I Khromacheva	1	3
18	(Japan) E Hozumi (Japan) M Kato	4	1
(Australia) A Barty (Australia) C Dellacqua	6	6
(Croatia) M Lučić-Baroni (Germany) A Petkovic	6	0^{r}
(Australia) D Gavrilova (Russia) A Pavlyuchenkova	2	0

Third round
(Romania) I-C Begu (China) S Zheng	6	6
(China) Y Duan (China) S Peng	4	2
(Australia) A Barty (Australia) C Dellacqua	7^{7}	6
(Australia) D Gavrilova (Russia) A Pavlyuchenkova	6^{2}	4

Quarterfinals
(Romania) I-C Begu (China) S Zheng	3	4
(Australia) A Barty (Australia) C Dellacqua	6	6

==== Section 4 ====
First round
6	(Czech Republic) L Hradecká (Czech Republic) K Siniaková	7	4	7^{7}
(United States) L Davis (United States) N Melichar	5	6	6^{2}
(Ukraine) L Kichenok (Ukraine) N Kichenok	7^{9}	2	6^{4}
(Croatia) A Konjuh (Poland) M Linette	6^{7}	6	7^{7}
(Chinese Taipei) C-j Chuang (Japan) M Doi	1^{r}
(China) C Liang (China) Q Wang	2
(Germany) A Beck (Czech Republic) R Voráčová	1	1
12	(Chinese Taipei) H-c Chan (Czech Republic) B Krejčíková	6	6
15	(Slovenia) A Klepač (Spain) MJ Martínez Sánchez	6^{2}	6	4
(Romania) S Cîrstea (Croatia) D Vekić	7^{7}	2	1^{r}
WC	(France) M Arcangioli (France) A Lim	2	1
(United States) J Brady (United States) A Riske	6	6
(Japan) S Aoyama (China) Z Yang	6^{6}	4
(Russia) A Kudryavtseva (Russia) A Panova	7^{8}	6
WC	(France) F Ferro (France) M Yerolymos	2	3
2	(Russia) E Makarova (Russia) E Vesnina	6	6

Second round
6	(Czech Republic) L Hradecká (Czech Republic) K Siniaková	6	4	6
(Croatia) A Konjuh (Poland) M Linette	0	6	2
(China) C Liang (China) Q Wang	3	7	3
12	(Chinese Taipei) H-c Chan (Czech Republic) B Krejčíková	6	5	6
15	(Slovenia) A Klepač (Spain) MJ Martínez Sánchez	6	6
(United States) J Brady (United States) A Riske	2	3
(Russia) A Kudryavtseva (Russia) A Panova	4	3
2	(Russia) E Makarova (Russia) E Vesnina	6	6

Third round
6	(Czech Republic) L Hradecká (Czech Republic) K Siniaková	7	7
12	(Chinese Taipei) H-c Chan (Czech Republic) B Krejčíková	5	5
15	(Slovenia) A Klepač (Spain) MJ Martínez Sánchez	6	3	2
2	(Russia) E Makarova (Russia) E Vesnina	3	6	6

Quarterfinals
6	(Czech Republic) L Hradecká (Czech Republic) K Siniaková	6	6
2	(Russia) E Makarova (Russia) E Vesnina	1	4
